= Zeenat Aman filmography =

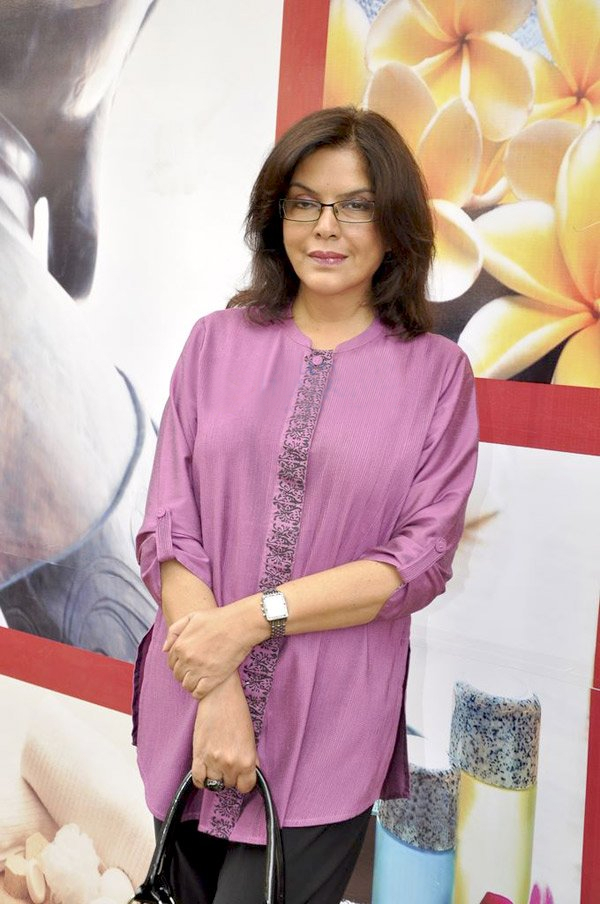
Aman in 2011

This is the full filmography of Zeenat Aman, an Indian actress who is known for her work in Bollywood films.

Aman began acting in 1970, and her early works included the films The Evil Within (1970) and Hulchul (1971). Her breakthrough came with the film Hare Rama Hare Krishna (1971), in which her performance was praised, and she won the Filmfare Best Supporting Actress Award for her performance. She next starred in the film Yaadon Ki Baaraat (1973), for which she received further recognition, and established herself as a leading actress in the seventies with starring roles in Roti Kapada Aur Makaan (1974), Ajanabee (1974), Warrant (1975), Chori Mera Kaam (1975), Dharam Veer (1977), Chhailla Babu (1977), Hum Kisise Kum Naheen (1977), and The Great Gambler (1979), all of which were successful. In 1978, Aman starred in the film Satyam Shivam Sundaram, which has received critical acclaim, and for the role, she was nominated for the Filmfare Award for Best Actress. She also starred in Don (1978), a film which spawned the Don film series.

In the 1980s, Aman had leading roles in five successful films in a row, Abdullah (1980), Alibaba Aur 40 Chor (1980), Qurbani (1980), Dostana (1980), and Insaf Ka Tarazu (1980), the latter of which Aman received praise for her performance, earning her another nomination for the Filmfare Award for Best Actress. She continued starring in films throughout the 1980s, starring in the successes Laawaris (1981), Mahaan (1983), Pukar (1983), Jagir (1984), and also had roles in the films Teesri Aankh (1982), Hum Se Hai Zamana (1983). Following her marriage to actor Mazhar Khan in 1985, Aman began appearing less frequently in films to focus on her marriage, and took a hiatus in 1989, appearing in her last film for that period, Gawaahi.

In 1999, Aman made a comeback to acting, appearing in the film Bhopal Express. She didn't continue acting until 2003, appearing in the film Boom, and has since starred in Ugly Aur Pagli (2008), Dunno Y... Na Jaane Kyon (2010), Chaurahen (2012), Strings of Passion (2014), Dunno Y2... Life Is a Moment (2015), Dil Toh Deewana Hai (2016), Sallu Ki Shaadi (2017), and Panipat (2019).

== Filmography ==
Key
†	Denotes films that have not yet been released

List of films and roles
Year	Title	Role	Notes
1970	The Evil Within	Reeta	
1971	Hungama	Nisha	
1971	Hulchul	Neena	
1972	Hare Rama Hare Krishna	Jasbir Jaiswal/Janice	
1973	Yaadon Ki Baaraat	Sunita	
1973	Heera Panna	Panna Singh	
1973	Dhund	Rani Ranjit Singh	
1974	Roti Kapada Aur Makaan	Sheetal	
1974	Prem Shastra	Barkha/Suman	
1974	Ishq Ishq Ishq	Pooja Pahar	
1974	Manoranjan	Nisha	
1974	Ajanabee	Reshmi	
1975	Warrant	Rita Verma	
1975	Chori Mera Kaam	Sharmili	
1976	Deewaangee	Kanchan	
1976	Balika Badhu	Voice over	
1977	Paapi	Rano/Vanita Kapoor/Rani	
1977	Kalabaaz	Lisa/Radha G. Sapru/Tina	
1977	Dharam Veer	Rajkumari Pallavi	
1977	Darling Darling	Madhu	
1977	Chhailla Babu	Rita	
1977	Aashiq Hoon Baharon Ka	Veera Rai	
1977	Hum Kisise Kum Naheen	Sunita	Special appearance
1978	Shalimar	Sheila Enders	
1978	Heeralal Pannalal	Ruby	
1978	Chor Ke Ghar Chor	Meena	
1978	Satyam Shivam Sundaram	Rupa	
1978	Don	Roma	
1979	The Great Gambler	Shabnam	
1979	Gol Maal	Cameo	
1980	Takkar	Sapna	
1980	Ram Balram	Madhu	
1980	Bombay 405 Miles	Radha	
1980	Abdullah	Zainab	
1980	Alibaba Aur 40 Chor	Fatima	
1980	Qurbani	Sheela	
1980	Dostana	Sheetal	
1980	Insaaf Ka Tarazu	Bharti Saxena	
1981	Professor Pyarelal	Sonia Singh/Asha Rai	
1981	Katilon Ke Kaatil	Jamila Banu	
1981	Krodhi	Neera Kumar Sahni	
1981	Laawaris	Mohini	
1982	Samraat	Suman/Sandhya/Gurbachan	
1982	Pyaas		
1982	Jaanwar	Rajkumari	
1982	Daulat	Geeta	
1982	Ashanti	Sonia	
1982	Gopichand Jasoos	Bela/Lacho/Shano Rani	
1982	Vakil Babu	Kalpana	
1982	Teesri Aankh	Barkha	
1983	Taqdeer	Nisha	
1983	Pukar	Julie	
1983	Hum Se Hai Zamana	Nisha	
1983	Mahaan	Rita	
1983	Bandhan Kuchchey Dhaagon Ka	Sneh	
1984	Yeh Desh	Sumati	
1984	Sohni Mahiwal	Zarina	
1984	Pakhandi	Preeti	
1984	Jagir	Seema	
1984	Meri Adalat	Pramila	
1985	Yaar Kasam	Bharati	
1985	Bhawani Junction	Reshma	
1985	Ameer Aadmi Gharib Aadmi	Kavita	
1985	Yaadon Ki Kasam	Chandni/Geeta	
1986	Haathon Ki Lakeeren	Geeta Singh	
1986	Baat Ban Jaye	Nisha Singh	
1986	Aurat		
1986	Waapsi		
1987	Daku Hasina	Roopa Saxena / Daku Hasina	
1988	Namumkin	Shobha	
1989	Tujhe Nahin; Chhodunga		
1989	Gawaahi	Janhvi Kaul	
1999	Bhopal Express	Zohrabai	
2003	Boom	Alice Rodriguez	
2005	Moksham	Babylona Menon	Malayalam film
2006	Jaana: Let's Fall in Love	Raju's mother	Special appearance
2007	Sirf Romance: Love by Chance	Durga Putri	
2008	Ugly Aur Pagli	Sandhiya	Special appearance
2009	Geeta In Paradise	Zeenat	
2010	Dunno Y... Na Jaane Kyon		
2012	Chaurahen	Woman	
2012	Monopoly the Game of Money		
2014	Strings of Passion	Roma	
2015	Dunno Y2... Life Is a Moment	Nazneen	
2016	Dil Toh Deewana Hai	Sunita	
2016	Black Currency		
2017	Sallu Ki Shaadi	Sallu's mother	
2017	Love Life & Screw Ups	Joanna	Web series
2019	Panipat	Sakina Begum	Cameo
2025	The Royals	Rajmata Maji Saheba Bhagyashree Devi	Netflix series
