= Anand Bakshi filmography =

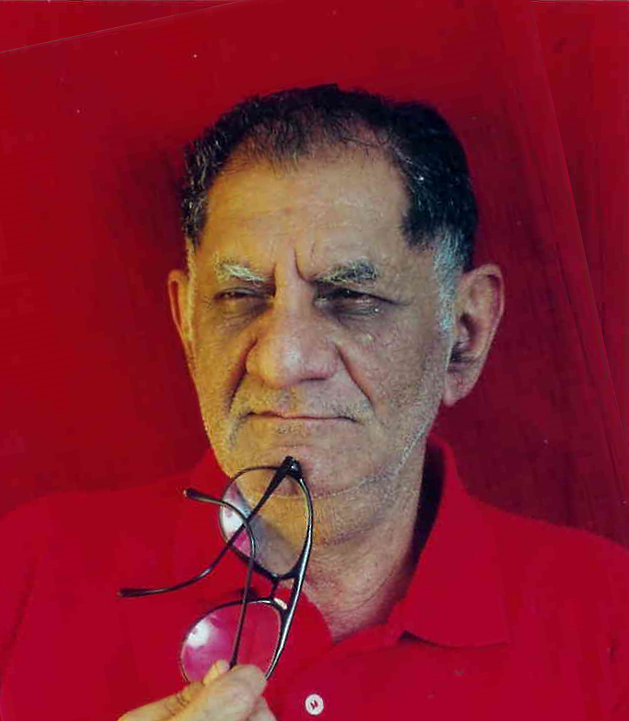
Anand Bakshi in 2001

Anand Bakshi (21 July 1930 – 30 March 2002) was an Indian poet and lyricist. He won Filmfare Award for Best Lyricist 4 times during his career. He wrote over 6,000 film songs in more than 300 films.

== Collaborations with composers ==
No.	Composer	No.	Composer	No.	Composer	No.	Composer	No.	Composer
303	Laxmikant-Pyarelal	7	S. Mohinder	2	Anil Biswas	1	Ismail Darbar	1	S.N. Tripathi
99	R. D. Burman	7	N. Datta	2	Sardul Kwatra	1	Rahul Sharma	1	Dhansingh
34	Kalyanji-Anandji	5	Shiv-Hari	2	M. M. Kreem	1	Nusrat Fateh Ali Khan	1	Kishore Kumar
26	Anu Malik	4	Dilip Sen & Sameer Sen	2	Nadeem–Shravan	1	Sukhwinder Singh	1	Talat Aziz
14	S.D. Burman	3	A.R. Rahman	2	Sanjeev-Darshan	1	Salil Chowdhury	1	Anjan Biswas
13	Rajesh Roshan	3	Ravindra Jain	2	Dattaram Wadkar	1	Nisar Bazmi	1	Aadesh Shrivastava
10	Viju Shah	3	Usha Khanna	2	Amar Uptal	1	B.N. Bali	1	Neeraj Vora & Uttank Vora
10	Anand–Milind	3	S.D. Batish	2	Naushad	1	Ravi	1	Adnan Sami
8	Bappi Lahiri	3	Anand Raj Anand	2	Sajid-Wajid	1	Bulo C. Rani	1	Lachhiram
7	Roshan	3	Nikhil Kamath & Vinay Tiwari	2	Surendra Singh Sodhi	1	Vasant Desai	1	McCoy Tyner
7	Jatin–Lalit	2	Chitragupt	1	Shankar-Jaikishan	1	Raju Singh	1	Ustad Amjad Ali Khan
7	Uttam Singh	2	C. Ramachandra	1	Vishal Bhardwaj	1	G.S. Kohli		

== 1950s ==
The music company in all 1950s films with Anand Bakshi's music was Saregama.

Year	Film	Banner-Producer	Music composer	Notes
1957	Sher-E-Baghdad	Hind Pictures	Jimmy	
1957	Silver King	People Pictures	Sudipt	
1958	Bhala Aadmi	Unity Films	Nisar Bazmi	Recorded 1st song on 9-11-1956
1958	Hum Bhi Kuch Kam Nahin	Filmistan Pvt. Ltd.	S. D. Batish	
1958	Miss Toofan Mail	People Pictures	Robin Chatterjee	
1958	Pehla Pehla Pyar	National Cine Corp.	B. N. Bali	
1958	Sun To Le Haseena	Filmistan Pvt. Ltd.	S. Mohinder	
1959	Air Mail	People Pictures	Sardul Singh Kwatra	
1959	CID Girl	Filmistan Pvt. Ltd.	Roshan	
1959	Ek Armaan Mera	Filmistan Pvt. Ltd.	S. D. Batish	
1959	Khoobsoorat Dhokha	Filmistan Pvt. Ltd.	S. Mohinder	
1959	Laal Nishaan	Deepak Films	Nirmal Kumar (S. D. Batish)	
1959	Lady Robinhood	Rekha Chitra	Sardul Singh Kwatra	
1959	Maine Jeena Seekh Liya	Filmistan Pvt. Ltd.	Roshan	
1959	Tin Tin Tin	Filmistan Pvt. Ltd.	Bulo C. Rani	

== 1960s ==
Films are sorted in alphabetical order by composer. All music companies are Saregama unless otherwise stated.

With R.D. Burman & N. Dutta
Films with R.D. Burman				Films with N. Dutta			
Year	Film	Banner-Producer	Notes	Year	Film	Banner-Producer	Notes
1965	Teesra Kaun	Bindu Kala Mandir		1962	Kaala Samundar	Deepak Chitra	
1966	Pati Patni	Mumtaz Films		1963	Holiday In Bombay	YuChaya	
1967	Chandan Ka Palna	Arzoo Films		1964	Badshah	Navkala Niketan	
1969	Aradhana	Shakti Films		1964	Hercules	Bohra Bros	
1969	Jyoti	Chitramitra		1965	Khakaan	Henna Deluxe	

With Kalyanji–Anandji & S. Mohinder
With Kalyanji–Anandji				With S. Mohinder			
Year	Film	Banner-Producer	Notes	Year	Film	Banner-Producer	Notes
1962	Mehendi Lagi Mere Haath	LimeLight		1960	Mehlon Ke Khwab	Madhubala Ltd	
1963	Sunehree Nagin	Everest Films		1960	Zameen Ke Tare	Chandra Movies	
1963	Young Technicians Unit	Baria Films??		1962	Baanke Saanwariya	KVS Productions	
1964	Dulha Dulhan	Nagina Films		1962	Pardesi Dhola	Peony Arts Production	Punjabi film
1964	Majboor	Delux Films (Hanna Delux ?)		1962	Reporter Raju	Wadia Bros	
1965	Himalaya Ki God Mein	Shri Prakash Pictures		1962	Banke Sanwaria	Dhanpat Rai	
1965	Jab Jab Phool Khile	LimeLight		1963	Zarakh Khan	Shantiniketan Films	
1966	Preet Na Jane Reet	Moviestan		1966	Professor X	Sweet Films	
1967	Aamne Samne	Sight & Sound Movies		1966	Sunehre Kadam	Saraswati Kalaamandir	
1968	Juaari	Lotus Productions					
1968	Teen Bahuraniyan	Gemini Productions					
1969	Mahal	Roopkala Pictures					
1969	Raja Saab	LimeLight					
1969	Tamanna	K. S. Pictures					

With Laxmikant-Pyarelal
1960-1964				1965-1969			
Year	Film	Banner-Producer	Notes	Year	Film	Banner-Producer	Notes
1964	Mr. X in Bombay	Thakkar Films International		1968	Raja Aur Runk	Prasad Productions	
1965	Boxer	Sudarshan Chitra		1968	Spy In Rome	Aadarshlok	
1965	Lutera	Shankar Movies		1968	Taqdeer	Rajshri Productions	
1965	Shrimaan Funtoosh	S. B. Productions		1969	Anjaana	Emkay Productions	
1966	Aasra	Seven Arts Pictures		1969	Aya Sawan Jhoom Ke	FilmYug	
1966	Aaye Din Bahar Ke	FilmYug		1969	Do Bhai	Dinamo International	
1966	Chhota Bhai	Olympics Pictures		1969	Do Raaste	Raj Khosla Films	
1966	Daku Mangal Singh	Pinky Films		1969	Jeene Ki Raah	Prasad Productions	
1966	Sau Saal Baad	Mansarover Pictures		1969	Jigri Dost	Vijayalakshmi Art Pictures	
1967	Anita	Raj Khosla Films		1969	Madhavi	Shri Ganesh Prasad Movies	
1967	Farz	Vijayalakshmi Art Pictures		1969	Mera Dost	Maya Productions	
1967	Jaal	New World Pictures		1969	Sajan	Delux Films	
1967	Milan	Prasad Productions		1969	Shart	Shankar Movies	
1967	Milan Ki Raat	Musical Movies					
1967	Night in London	Kapoor Films					

With other composers (5 or less movies)
1960-1963					1964-1969				
Year	Film	Banner-Producer	Music composer	Notes	Year	Film	Banner-Producer	Music composer	Notes
1960	Jasoos				1964	Awara Badal	Amar Jyot Films	Usha Khanna	
1960	Lucky Number	Manmohan Films	Anil Biswas		1964	Yaadein	Sunil Dutt	Vasant Desi	
1960	Return of Mr. Superman	Manmohan Films	Anil Biswas		1965	Aadhi Raat Ke Baad	Movie Tone	Chitragupt	
1960	Nakhrewali	Cine Arts	Nirmal Kumar		1965	Hum Deewane	Young India Entertainment	C. Ramchandra	
1961	Razia Sultana	Movie India	Lachhiram		1965	Namaste Ji	D.M. Movies	G.S. Kohli	
1961	Warrant	Shantiniketan Films	Roshan		1965	Tarzan Comes To Delhi	Amar Chhaya	Dattaram	
1962	Vallah Kya Baat Hai	Nitie Pictures	Roshan		1966	LaBella	Young India Entertainment	C. Ramchandra	
1963	Phool Bane Angaarey		Anil Biswas		1966	Jawaan Mard	Kedar Lakshmi Productions	Dattaram	
1963	Jab Se Tumhen Dekha Hai	Amar Chhaya	Dattaram		1966	Devar	Delux Films / De Lux Films	Roshan	
1963	Commercial Pilot Officer	Deepak Jyoti	Roshan		1967	Shamsheer	Raj Film Corporation		
1963	Raja	Mukul Pictures	S.N. Tripathi		1968	Hai Mera Dil	Manohar Films	Usha Khanna	
					1968	Apanjan	KL Kapoor Productions	S. D. Burman	
					1969	Hum Ek Hain	R. B. Films	Usha Khanna	

== 1970s ==
With Laxmikant-Pyarelal
1970-1972				1973-1976				1977-1979			
Year	Film	Banner-Producer	Notes	Year	Film	Banner-Producer	Notes	Year	Film	Banner-Producer	Notes
1970	Aan Milo Sajna	FilmYug		1973	Bobby	R. K. Films		1977	Adha Din Aadhi Raat	Bharti International	
1970	Bachpan	Aatma Arts Films		1973	Gaai Aur Gori	Dhandayuthapani Films		1977	Aashiq Hoon Baharon Ka	Shiv Kala Mandir	Polydor
1970	Darpan	Balan Movies Combine		1973	Gaddaar	Eastern Films		1977	Amar Akbar Anthony	MKD Films	Polydor
1970	Devi	Olympics Pictures		1973	Insaaf	Venus Pictures		1977	Anurodh	Samanta Enterprises	
1970	Himmat	Bharti International		1973	Keemat	Bharti International		1977	Apnapan	FilmYug	
1970	Humjoli	Tirupati Films		1973	Kuchhe Dhaage	Raj Khosla Films		1977	Chacha Bhatija	Dreamland	
1970	Jeevan Mrityu	Rajshri Productions		1973	Loafer	Century Films		1977	Chhailla Babu	Mukerji Bros.	Polydor
1970	Khilona	Prasad Productions		1973	Manchali	Raja Nawathe Productions		1977	Chor Sipahee	Murghan Enterprise	
1970	Pushpanjali	Kishore Sahu Productions		1973	Suraj Aur Chanda	Sooraj Films / Suraj Films	Polydor	1977	Dharam Veer	S. S. Movietone	Polydor
1970	Maa Aur Mamta	Suchitra Kala Mandir		1973	Sweekar	Filmlands		1977	Dildaar	Suresh Productions	
1970	Mastana	Suchitra Kala Mandir		1974	Amir Garib	Emkay Productions		1977	Dream Girl	Sarthy International	
1970	Sharafat	Seven Arts Pictures		1974	Badla	Century Films		1977	Immaan Dharam	Suchitra Kala Mandir	
1970	Suhana Safar	Century Films		1974	Bidaai	Prasad Productions		1977	Thief of Baghdad	Madan Movies	
1971	Aap Aye Bahaar Ayee	Emkay Productions		1974	Dost	Suchitra Kala Mandir		1977	Tinku	Navin Pictures	
1971	Banphool	Filmlands		1974	Dulhan	Sujatha International (Madras)		1978	Aahuti	Basho Productions	
1971	Chaahat	New Films Corporation		1974	Duniya Ka Mela	Pearl Pictures		1978	Amar Shakti	A K Movies	Polydor
1971	Dushman	Suchitra Kala Mandir		1974	Prem Shastra	Nalanda Productions		1978	Chakravyuha	Asha Art International	
1971	Haathi Mere Saathi	Devar Films		1974	Majboor	Suchitra Kala Mandir		1978	Daaku Aur Jawan	Lotus Productions	
1971	Haseenon Ka Devata	Mukul Enterprises		1974	Pagli	Asha Art International		1978	Dil Aur Deewar	Vijaya Productions & Suresh Productions	
1971	Lagan	Rajesh Roshan		1974	Pocket Maar	Cine Mandir	Polydor	1978	Main Tulsi Tere Aangan Ki	Raj Khosla Films	
1971	Mehboob Ki Mehndi	Rahul Theatres		1974	Roti	Aashirwad Pictures	Polydor	1978	Phaansi	Eastern Films	
1971	Mera Gaon Mera Desh	Khosla Enterprises	Polydor	1974	Vaada Tera Vaada	Thakkar Films International		1978	Satyam Shivam Sundaram	R. K. Films	
1971	Uphaar	Rajshri Productions		1975	Aakraman	FilmYug		1979	Amar Deep	Sujatha International	Music company was Inreco
1971	Woh Din Yaad Karo	New Cine International		1975	Chaitali	Bimal Roy Productions		1979	Dil Kaa Heera	Uddyam Productions	
1972	Buniyaad	Pragati Chitra International		1975	Lafange	H M Films		1979	Gautam Govinda	Murghan Enterprise	
1972	Ek Bechara	S. R. International		1975	Natak	Filmlands		1979	Kali Ghata	Shivalik Pictures	
1972	Gora Aur Kala	Shankar Movies		1975	Pratiggya	Bikramjeet Films		1979	Lok Parlok	Shri Pallavi Productions	
1972	Haar Jeet	Prithvi Pictures		1975	Prem Kahani	Khosla Combines		1979	Magroor	Century Films	
1972	Jeet	Babu Movies Combines P L		1976	Aap Beati	Emkay Productions		1979	Prem Bandhan	Gauri Films	
1972	Mome Ki Gudiya	Emkay Productions		1976	Do Ladkiyan	Natraj International		1979	Prem Vivah	Ranglok Films	
1972	Piya Ka Ghar	Rajshri Productions		1976	Janeman	Navketan Films		1979	Sargam	N. N. Sippy Productions	
1972	Raja Jani	Seven Arts Pictures		1976	Koi Jeeta Koi Haara	Vijayalakshmi Art Pictures		1979	Suhaag	Suresh Desai & Associates	
1972	Raaste Kaa Patthar	Khosla Enterprises	Polydor	1976	Maa	Devar Films		1979	Yuvraaj	Venus Pictures	
1972	Roop Tera Mastana	Suchitra Kala Mandir		1976	Charas	Sagar Enterprises		1979	Zaalim	King of Kings Productions	
1972	Shaadi Ke Baad	Ravi Shankar Films									
1972	Subah-o-Shyam	Sri Ganesh Prasad Movies									

With S.D. Burman, Kalyanji-Anandji, and miscellaneous composers
Misc					S. D. Burman				Kalyanji–Anandji			
Year	Film	Banner-Producer	Music composer	Notes	Year	Film	Banner-Producer	Notes	Year	Film	Banner-Producer	Notes
1970	My Love	Atool Arts	Daan Singh		1970	Ishq Par Zor Nahin	Twinkle Star		1970	Geet	Sagar Art Films	
1971	Main Sunder Hoon	AVM Productions	Shankar–Jaikishan		1971	Naya Zamana	Pramod Films		1970	Mere Humsafar	Labela Films	
1972	Zameen Aasmaan	AVM Productions	Kishore Kumar		1972	Anuraag	Shakti Films		1971	Maryada	Lalit Kala Mandir	
1973	Naya Nasha	United Four	Sapan Chakraborty		1972	Yeh Gulistan Hamara	Guru Dutt Films		1972	Anokhi Pehchan	Ajay Devgn FFilms	
1975	Aag Aur Toofan	RR Films	N. Datta		1972	Zindagi Zindagi	John Pictures		1972	Joroo Ka Ghulam	United Four	
1975	Angaare	Apolo Arts	Chitragupta		1973	Jugnu	Pramod Films		1972	Sweet Heart	Suraj Prakash	song-Koi Koi Aadmi diwana hota hai
1975	Julie	Vijaya Productions	Rajesh Roshan	Polydor	1974	Prem Nagar	Vijaya Productions & Suresh Productions		1974	Kasauti	Lalit Kala Mandir	
1975	Sunehra Sansar	Vijaya Madhavee Movies	Naushad		1975	Chupke Chupke	Rupam Chitra		1975	Bhoola Bhatka	Angel Movies	Polydor
1976	Jeevan Jyoti	AVM Productions	Salil Chowdhary		1976	Barood	Jugnu Enterprises		1976	Bairaag	M.R. Productions	
1977	Yehi Hai Zindagi	Vijaya Productions	Rajesh Roshan	Polydor	1976	Deewaangee	Subodh Mukherjee Productions		1977	Kalabaaz	Pashupati Pictures	
1978	Pati Patni Aur Woh	B R Films	Ravindra Jain		1976	Tyaag	Films & Films International					
1978	Swarg Narak	Vijaya Productions	Rajesh Roshan	Polydor								
1978	Tumhari Kasam	Associated Films and Finance Corporation	Rajesh Roshan									
1979	Mr. Natwarlal	Navjeevan Films	Rajesh Roshan									

With R.D. Burman
1970-1973				1974-1976				1977-1979			
Year	Film	Banner-Producer	Notes	Year	Film	Banner-Producer	Notes	Year	Film	Banner-Producer	Notes
1970	Kati Patang	Shakti Films		1974	Ajnabee	Samanta Enterprises		1977	Chalta Purza	Bhappie Sonie Productions	
1970	The Train	Rose Movies		1974	Charitraheen	Shri Lokenath Chitramandir		1977	Darling Darling	Fortune Films International	Polydor
1971	Pyar Ki Kahani	Vijayalakshmi Art Pictures		1974	Dil Diwana	Rose Movies		1977	Mukti	Tilak Movies P L	
1971	Amar Prem	Shakti Films		1974	Humshakal	Olympics Pictures		1978	Azaad	Pramod Films	Polydor
1971	Hare Rama Hare Krishna	Navketan Films		1974	Imaan	Guru Dutt Films		1978	Bhola Bhala	Venkateshwara Pictures	Polydor
1971	Lakhon Mein Ek	Gemini Productions		1974	Ishq Ishq Ishq	Navketan Films		1978	Naukri	R. S. J. Productions	
1971	Paraya Dhan	Kiran Productions		1974	Manoranjan	Eagle Films		1978	Naya Daur	United Movie Arts	
1972	Sanjog	Gemini Arts P L / Gemini Productions		1975	Sholay	Sippy Films		1978	Shalimar	Vijayalakshmi Art Pictures & Judson Productions Inc.	Polydor
1972	Apna Desh	Olympics Pictures		1975	Warrant	N P International		1978	Phandebaaz	Geeta Films	
1972	Jawani Diwani	Rose Movies		1975	Raaja	Dhandayuthapani Films		1979	Jurmana	Shri Lokenath Chitramandir	
1972	Seeta Aur Geeta	Sippy Films		1976	Balika Badhu	Shakti Films		1979	The Great Gambler	Associated Films Finance Corporation	
1973	Rickshawala	Sathya Movies		1976	Bhanwar	Evershine Pictures					
1973	Heera Panna	Navketan Films		1976	Bullet	Navketan Films					
1973	Jaise Ko Taisa	AVM Productions		1976	Dhongee	Kant Kumar Productions					
1973	Jheel Ke Us Paar	Bhappie Sonie Productions		1976	Maha Chor	Dachi Films P L					
1973	Mr. Romeo	Subodh Mukherjee Productions		1976	Mehbooba	M.R. Productions					
1973	Namak Haraam	R. S. J. Productions	Polydor	1976	Nehle Pe Dehla	Ajanta Arts					
1973	Raja Rani	FilmYug		1976							
1973	Shareef Budmaash	Navketan Films		1976							

== 1980s ==
With misc composers
1980-1983					1984-1987					1988-1989				
Year	Film	Banner-Producer	Composer	Music company	Year	Film	Banner-Producer	Composer	Music company	Year	Film	Banner-Producer	Composer	Music company
1980	Aap Ke Deewane	Filmkraft	Rajesh Roshan		1984	Aasmaan	Navjeevan Films	Anu Malik	MIL	1988	Kabzaa	Vishesh Films	Rajesh Roshan	T-Series
1980	Patita	Tristar Movies	Bappi Lahiri		1984	Phansi Ke Bad	Eastern Films	Anu Malik	T-Series	1988	Khoon Baha Ganga Mein	Aarohi Films	Anu Malik	T-Series
1981	Daasi	Gaurav International Productions	Ravindra Jain	Polydor	1984	Sohni Mahiwal	Eagle Films	Anu Malik	MIL	1988	Mahaveera	K.S. Enterprises	Kalyanji–Anandji	T-Series
1981	Jyoti	Pramod Films	Bappi Lahiri		1985	Yudh	Trimurti Films	Kalyanji–Anandji	MIL	1988	Saazish	Malhotra Films	Kalyanji–Anandji	
1982	Ayaash	Shakti Films	Ravindra Jain		1986	Baat Ban Jaye	Jay Films	Kalyanji–Anandji	MIL	1988	Shahenshah	Film Vision	Amar Utpal	Venus Pictures
1982	Johny I Love You	Nav Jeevan Films	Rajesh Roshan	MIL	1986	Jaal	Eagle Films	Anu Malik	CBS	1988	Tamacha	Tirupati Pictures	Bappi Lahiri	T-Series
1982	Vidhaata	Trimurti Films	Kalyanji–Anandji		1987	Chakma	Peekay Movies/Devi Films	Bappi Lahiri		1989	Vardi	Cineyug	Anu Malik	T-Series
1983	Nastik	V.R. Pictures	Kalyanji–Anandji	MIL						1989	Abhimanyu	Navjeevan Films	Anu Malik	T-Series
										1989	Chandni	Yash Raj Films	Shivkumar Sharma, Hariprasad Chaurasia	
										1989	Garibon Ka Daata	Saptarishi Films	Bappi Lahiri	T-Series
										1989	Tridev	Trimurti Films	Kalyanji–Anandji	

With R.D. Burman
1980-1982				1983-1985				1986-1989			
Year	Film	Banner-Producer	Music Company	Year	Film	Banner-Producer	Music Company	Year	Film	Banner-Producer	Music Company
1980	Abdullah	Zafo Films	Polydor	1983	Betaab	Vijayta Films	Saregama	1986	Anokha Rishta	Century Films	T-Series
1980	Alibaba Aur 40 Chor	Eagle Films	Saregama	1983	Farishta	Sikand Films	Saregama	1986	Ek Main Aur Ek Tu	Ravi Tandon Productions	T-Series
1980	Bulundi		T-Series	1983	Lovers	Aryan Films	Saregama	1986	Palay Khan	Shakti Films	Saregama
1980	Qatil Kaun	Vishwakarma	Polydor	1983	Main Awara Hoon	Shakti Films	CBS	1986	Samundar	M.R. Productions	T-Series
1980	Shaan	Sippy Films	Polydor	1983	Romance	Sagar Enterprises	MIL	1986	Shatru	Pramod Films	T-Series
1980	Takkar	Padmalaya Studios	Saregama	1984	Awaaz	Shakti Films	CBS	1987	Dacait	H. S. Rawail/Rahul Theatres International	T-Series
1981	Barsaat Ki Ek Raat	Shakti Films	Inreco	1984	Hum Hain Lajawab	Milan Movies	Saregama	1987	Hifazat	Bhanodaya Entertainment	T-Series
1981	Love Story	Aryan Films	Saregama	1984	Jagir	Pramod Films	Pink Sound	1987	Itihaas	Navjeevan Films	MIL
1981	Rocky	Nalanda Productions	Polydor	1984	Maati Maange Khoon	Ramayana Chitra	CBS	1987	Khazana	Subhash International	Saregama
1982 Raksha	Bharati International	Saregama		1984	Sunny	Nalanda Productions	CBS	1988	Mil Gayee Manzil Mujhe	Chetna Movies	CBS
1982 Raksha	Aamne Samne	Shakti Films	Polydor	1984	Yeh Desh	Bharati International	Saregama	1988	Rama O Rama	Mirza Brothers	
1982 Raksha	Ashanti	Eagle Films	Saregama	1985	Aar Paar	Shakti Films	Saregama	1989	Aag Se Khelenge	N.N. Sippy's	T-Series
1982 Raksha	Bemisal	Shri Lokenath Chitramandir	Saregama	1985	Alag Alag	Aashirwad Films International	T-Series	1989	Jurrat	Aryan Films	T-Series
1982 Raksha	Dard Ka Rishta	Ajanta Arts	Saregama	1985	Hum Dono	Happy Films (India)	CBS				
1982 Raksha	Shakti	M.R. Productions	Saregama	1985	Lava	Iqbal Sing's	Saregama				
1982 Raksha	Teri Kasam	Navjeevan Films	MIL								
1982 Raksha	Yeh To Kamaal Ho Gaya	Bharti International	Saregama								

With Laxmikant–Pyarelal
1980-1982				1983-1986				1987-1989			
Year	Film	Banner-Producer	Music Company	Year	Film	Banner-Producer	Music Company	Year	Film	Banner-Producer	Music Company
1980	Aasha	FilmYug	Saregama	1983	Andha Kanoon	Vijayalakshmi Art Pictures	Saregama	1987	Insaf Ki Pukar	Shiv Kala Mandir	Venus Pictures
1980	Bandish	Suresh Productions	Polydor	1983	Arpan	FilmYug	Saregama	1987	Madadgaar	BNT Films	CBS
1980	Choron Ki Baaraat	Citizen Pictures	Saregama	1983	Avtaar	Emkay Productions	Saregama	1987	Mera Karam Mera Dharam	Bemisal Films	Saregama
1980	Do Premee	Shalini Films	Saregama	1983	Bekaraar	Jagapathi Art Pictures	Saregama	1987	Nazrana	Filmovision	T-Series
1980	Dostana	Dharma Productions	Polydor	1983	Coolie	MKD Films & Aasia Films	MIL	1987	Parivaar	Brighu Maharaj Films	Venus
1980	Hum Paanch	S.K. Films Enterprises	Polydor	1983	Hero	Mukta Arts	Saregama	1987	Sansar	Vijayalakshmi Art Pictures	T-Series
1980	Judaai	Prasad Art Pictures	Polydor	1983	Mujhe Insaaf Chahiye	DVS Productions	MIL	1987	Sindoor	Tina Films International	T-Series
1980	Jyoti Bane Jwala	Tirupati Pictures	Saregama	1983	Prem Tapasya	Annapurna Studios	Saregama	1987	Uttar Dakshin	Deepali Arts	CBS
1980	Kala Pani	Fine Art Pictures	Saregama	1983	Woh Saat Din	S.K. Films Enterprises	MIL	1988	Agnee	FilmYug	Venus
1980	Karz	Mukta Arts	Saregama	1983	Zara Si Zindagi	Premaalaya	Saregama	1988	Bees Saal Baad	Nishi Productions	T-Series
1980	Maang Bharo Sajana	Laxmi Productions	Saregama	1984	Yeh Ishq Nahin Aasaan	IRA Films	Saregama	1988	Charnon Ki Saugandh	Tina Films International	T-Series
1980	Nishana	Roja Pictures	Saregama	1984	Akalmand	G.R.P. Arts	MIL	1988	Do Waqt Ki Roti	Satyendra Films	T-Series
1980	Ram Balram	Nav Jeevan Films	Saregama	1984	All Rounder	Emkay Productions	Saregama	1988	Ganga Tere Desh Mein	BMB Productions	T-Series
1981	Aas Paas	FilmYug	Saregama	1984	Baazi	Shiv Kala Mandir	CBS	1988	Ram-Avtar	Kalpeshwar Productions	
1981	Ek Duuje Ke Liye	Prasad Productions	Saregama	1984	Bad Aur Badnam	K.D.S. Films	Saregama	1988	Inteqam	Shri Krishna Films	T-Series
1981	Ek Hi Bhool	Vijayalakshmi Art Pictures	Saregama	1984	Ek Nai Paheli	P.S.R. Pictures	MIL	1988	Khatron Ke Khiladi	Jagapathi International	T-Series
1981	Fiffty Fiffty	Mukerji Brothers	Saregama	1984	Ghar Ek Mandir	Tina Films International	Saregama	1988	Mar Mitenge	TUTU Films	T-Series
1981	Krodhi	Ranjit Films	Saregama	1984	Inquilaab	Sri Ishwar Productions	CBS	1988	Pyaar Ka Mandir	Amit Arts	T-Series
1981	Meri Aawaz Suno	Padmalaya Studios	Saregama	1984	Jeene Nahi Doonga	Shankar Movies	Saregama	1988	Pyaar Mohabbat	Marco Enterprises	
1981	Naseeb	MKD Films	Polydor	1984	John Jani Janardhan	Vijayalakshmi Art Pictures	CBS	1989	Gharana	Tina Films Universal	T-Series
1981	Sharada	Shiv Kala Mandir	Polydor	1984	Sharara	Angel Films	CBS	1989	Bhrashtachar	Sippy Films	
1982	Raaste Pyar Ke	Jagapathi Art Pictures	Saregama	1984	Mera Dost Mera Dushman	Johny Bakshi Films	MIL	1989	Chaalbaaz	Vijayalakshmi Art Pictures	
1982	Vakil Babu	S.R. Films Combines	Saregama	1984	Mera Faisla	Ranjit Films	Saregama	1989	Dost Garibon Ka	M.I. Films Combine/Lucky Studios	
1982	Baghavat	Sagar Films		1985	Jawaab	Suchitra Kala Mandir	MIL	1989	Elaan-E-Jung	S.K.F. Combines	Tips Industries
1982	Apna Bana Lo	Amber Films	Polydor	1985	Meraa Ghar Mere Bachche	Prasad Productions	Saregama	1989	Desh Waasi	Rajiv Goswami	
1982	Bhagawat	Sagar Films	Saregama	1985	Meri Jung	N.N. Sippy Productions	Saregama	1989	Nigahen: Nagina Part II	Eastern Films	
1982	Desh Premee	S.S. Movitone	Polydor	1985	Sarfarosh	Tirupati Pictures	Saregama	1989	Ram Lakhan	Suneha Arts	Saregama
1982	Do Dishayen	Sudarshan Enterprises	Saregama	1985	Yaadon Ki Kasam	T. C. Dewan	Universal	1989	Sachai Ki Taqat	Sadanah Brothers	T-Series
1982	Farz Aur Kanoon	Roja Pictures	Saregama	1986	Swarg Se Sunder	Tina Films International	T-Series	1989	Shehzaade	Maatarani Films	T-Series
1982	Ghazab	N.N. Sippy Productions	Saregama	1986	Aag Aur Shola	Tirupati Pictures	T-Series				
1982	Insaan	Mukesh Movies	Saregama	1986	Aakhree Raasta	Vijayalakshmi Art Pictures	T-Series |				
1982	Jeevan Dhaara	Prasad Art Pictures	MIL	1986	Aap Ke Saath	FilmYug	T-Series				
1982	Main Intaquam Loonga	Prasad Art Pictures	MIL	1986	Aisa Pyaar Kahan	TUTU Films	Venus				
1982	Rajput	M R Productions/Mushir Riyaz Productions	Saregama	1986	Amrit	Emkay Productions	Saregama				
1982	Samraat	Seven Arts Pictures	Saregama	1986	Dosti Dushmani	Srinath Productions	T-Series				
1982	Taaqat	Aanandam Arts	Polydor	1986	Kala Dhanda Goray Log	A.A.A. Films	T-Series				
1982	Teesri Aankh	Subodh Mukherjee Productions	Saregama	1986	Karma	Mukta Arts	Saregama				
1982	Teri Maang Sitaron Se Bhar Doon	Raj Khosla Films	Polydor	1986	Naache Mayuri	Usha Kiran Movies	T-Series				
				1986	Naam	Aryan Films	Saregama				
				1986	Qatl	R.K. Nayyar Films	Saregama				
				1986	Sadaa Suhagan	Vidyashree Films	T-Series				
				1986	Saugaat	Jaya Gowri Films					
				1986	Swati	Prasad Productions	T-Series				

== 1990s ==
With music composers
1990-1992					1993-1996					1997-1999				
Year	Film	Banner-Producer	Composer	Music Company	Year	Film	Banner-Producer	Composer	Music Company	Year	Film	Banner-Producer	Composer	Music Company
1990	Awaargi	Swaraajya Shree Movies	Anu Malik	T-Series	1993	Darr	Yash Raj Films	Shiv–Hari	Saregama	1997	Dil Toh Pagal Hai	Yash Raj Films	Uttam Singh	Saregama
1990	Doodh Ka Karz	Aftab Pictures	Anu Malik	T-Series	1993	Tum Karo Vaada	Robin Films Intl	R. D. Burman	Tips Industries / Vishwa	1997	Aflatoon	Tridev Arts	Dilip Sen & Sameer Sen	T-Series
1990	Jeene Do	Trishul Arts	R. D. Burman	Weston	1993	Pehla Nasha	Ahlan Productions & M.A. Rahim	Neeraj & Uttank Neeraj Vora Uttank Vora	Time	1997	Ankhon Mein Tum Ho	Aradhana Films	Anu Malik	His Master's Voice
1991	Lamhe	Yash Raj Films	Shiv-Hari	Saregama	1993	Dil Ne Ikaar Kiya	Kushal Films	Anu Malik	Venus	1997	Qahar	Shankar Films	Anand–Milind	Zee
1991	Izzat	Aftab Pictures	Anu Malik		1993	Sahibaan	Parul Films International	Shiv & Hari	T-Series	1997	Chirag	Saptarishi Films	Rajesh Roshan	PolyGram
1991	Farishtay	S.G.S. Films	Bappi Lahiri		1993	Aashik Awara	Eagle Films	Laxmikant–Pyarelal	Weston	1997	Gupt: The Hidden Truth	Trimurti Films	Viju Shah	Tips Industries
1991	Shikari: The Hunter	Eagle Films	Anu Malik	Weston	1994	Mohra	Trimurti Films	Viju Shah	Venus/Only two songs were not written by him - "Na Kajre Ki Dhaar" and "Dil Har Koi", which are credited to Indeevar	1997	Dil To Pagal Hai	Yash Raj Films	Uttam Singh	His Master's Voice
1991	Pratikar	A.G. Films	Bappi Lahiri	Venus	1994	Ram Jaane		Anu Malik	PolyGram	1997	Ghulam-E-Mustafa	SGS Cine Arts Intl	Rajesh Roshan	Time
1991	Yodha	Cineyug	Bappi Lahiri	Venus	1994	Pehla Pehla Pyar	Brar Productions	Anand–Milind	Venus	1997	Gupt: The Hidden Truth	Trimurti Films	Viju Shah	Tips Industries
1991	Inspector Kiron	Mamta Movies	Bappi Lahiri		1994	Aazmayish		Anand–Milind	Tips Industries	1997	Pardes	Mukta Arts	Nadeem–Shravan	Tips Industries
1992	Chamatkar	Eagle Films	Anu Malik	Weston	1995	Ab Insaf Hoga	Parth Productions	Anand–Milind	Tips Industries	1998	Dand Naya	Mateshwari Films	Rajesh Roshan	Time
1992	Marg/Prem Dharam	Swarajya Shree Movies	Anu Malik	T-Series	1995	Ahankaar	Shakti Films	Anu Malik	Ultra	1998	Jab Pyaar Kisise Hota Hai	Tips Industries	Jatin–Lalit	Tips Industries
1992	Parampara	A.G. Films	Shiv-Hari	Saregama	1995	Ravan Raaj: A True Story	Maa Sherawali Prod.	Viju Shah	Tips Industries	1998	Sham Ghansham	Suneha Arts	Vishal Bhardwaj	Tips Industries
1992	Police Officer	Aftab Pictures	Anu Malik	T-Series	1995	Dilwale Dulhania Le Jayenge	Emkay Productions	Jatin-Lalit	Saregama	1998	Zakhm	Pooja Bhatt Productions	M. M. Kreem	His Master's Voice
1992	Tu Chor Main Sipahi	Prooja Arts	Dilip Sen & Sameer Sen	Venus	1996	Jaan	Suneha Arts	Anand–Milind	Tips Industries	1998	Jhooth Bole Kauwa Kaate	Tri-star International	Anand–Milind	PolyGram
1992	Vishwatma	Trimurti Films	Viju Shah	Saregama	1996	Bhishma	R.R.R. Movies	Dilip Sen & Sameer Sen	Zee	1998	Zor	Vicky Films	Agosh	Plus Music
1992	Mr. Bond	Keshu Ramsay/Shambhu/Ramesh Yadav	Anand–Milind	T-Series/Wrote 1 song - "Baadal Garje Bijli Chamke"	1996	Jung	A. Saptrishi Films	Nadeem–Shravan	Time	1998				
					1996	Return of Jewel Thief	Arshee Films	Jatin–Lalit	Zee	1999	Aarzoo	Vikas Mohan	Anu Malik & Surendra Singh Sodhi	
					1996	Tere Mere Sapne	Amitabh Bachchan Corporation	Viju Shah	Big-B	1999	Taal	Mukta Arts	A. R. Rahman	Tips Industries
										1999	Kachche Dhaage	Tips Industries	Nusrat Fateh Ali Khan	Tips Industries
										1999	Kohram	Mehul Movies	Dilip Sen & Sameer Sen	PolyGram
										1999	Hum Tum Pe Marte Hain	Cheetah Yajnesh Shetty	Uttam Singh	
										1999	Love You Hamesha	Vijay Amritraj	A. R. Rahman	Zee
										1999	Hindustan Ki Kasam	Ajay Devgn FFilms	Sukhwinder Singh	Tips Industries

With Laxmikant–Pyarelal
1990-1992				1993-1996				1997-1999			
Year	Film	Banner-Producer	Music Company	Year	Film	Banner-Producer	Music Company	Year	Film	Banner-Producer	Music Company
1990	Agneepath	Dharma Productions	Weston	1991	Ajooba	Aasia Films	T-Series	1992	Angaar	Aarishaa International	Saregama
1990	Amba	Emkay Productions	T-Series	1991	Akayla	M.R. Productions	Venus	1992	Apradhi	Ratan International	Tips Industries
1990	Amiri Garibi	Tutu Films	T-Series	1991	Banjaran	Bhawani Pictures	Weston	1992	Dil Hi To Hai	Magnum Films International	Tips Industries
1990	Hum Se Na Takrana	Bahry Films	T-Series	1991	Benaam Badsha	Tina Films Enterprises	Saregama	1992	Heer Ranjha	Eastern Films	Tips Industries
1990	Izzatdaar	Divya Films International	T-Series	1991	Hum	Romesh Films	Saregama	1992	Khuda Gawah	Glamour Films	Tips Industries
1990	Veeru Dada	Sri Haripriya Cine Creations	Saregama	1991	Khoon Ka Karz	Bhappi Sonie Productions	Weston	1992	Kshatriya	Pushpa Movies	Tips Industries
1990	Kroadh	Verma Films	Venus	1991	Lakshmanrekha	Om Shakti Films	Venus	1992	Prem Deewane	Suneha Arts	Saregama
1990	Pati Patni Aur Tawaif	Shankar Movies	T-Series	1991	Mast Kalandar	Rahul Rawail	Weston	1992	Humlaa	Seven Arts Pictures	
1990	Pratibandh	Geetha Arts	Tips Industries	1991	Paap Ki Aandhi	Shivkala Movies	T-Series	1992	Swarg Se Pyara Ghar Hamara	Waris Pictures	His Master's Voice
1990	Pyar Ka Karz	Shiromanee Chitra	Venus	1991	Mast Kalandar	Rahul Rawail	Weston	1993	Phool	Aryan Films	Anand–Milind His Master's Voice
1990	Qayamat Ki Raat	Kumar Mangat Productions	Tips Industries	1991	Pyar Hua Chori Chori	Anirudh Arts	Sterling	1993	Chahoonga Main Tujhe	A.H. Movies	Royal
1990	Sher Dil	Akshar International Productions	T-Series	1991	Pyar Ka Devta	AMU Enterprises	Tips Industries	1993	Gumrah	Dharma Productions	His Master's Voice
1990	Sheshnaag	AA Films	T-Series	1991	Khilaaf	Krishna Movies	Tips Industries	1993	Khal Nayak	Mukta Arts	Tips Industries
1990	Majboor	Bhagavati Pictures		1991	Dhun	BNA International	His Master's Voice	1993	Bedardi	Lama Productions	Tips Industries
				1991	Chauraha	Revati Films	Time	1994	Aurat Aurat Aurat	S.S. Khimanni Movitone	Tarana
								1994	Paappi Devataa	Kala Bharti	Prism
								1995	Dilbar	Ghori Arts	Tips Industries
								1995	Prem	Narsimha Enterprises	His Master's Voice
								1995	Trimurti	Mukta Arts	Tips Industries
								1996	Rajkumar	TUTU Films	Venus
								1997	Mahaanta	Ayesha Films	Zee
								1997	Deewana Mastana	M.K.D. Films Combine	Venus
								1997	Barsaat Ki Raat	Timma Films	Venus
								1997	Maha-Yudh	KDS Films	Plus Music

== 2000s ==
Collaborators
2000-2001					2002					2003				
Year	Film	Banner-Producer	Composer	Music Company	Year	Film	Banner-Producer	Composer	Music Company	Year	Film	Banner-Producer	Composer	Music Company
2000	Mohabbatein	Yash Chopra	Jatin–Lalit	Saregama & YRF Music	2001	Rahul	Mukta Arts	Anu Malik & Anjan Biswas		2002	Kuchh Dil Ne Kaha		Nikhil–Vinay	T-Series
2000	Raju Chacha	Ajay Devgn FFilms	Jatin–Lalit	Sony Music India	2001	Yaadein	Mukta Arts	Anu Malik	Tips Industries	2002	Kitne Door Kitne Paas		Sanjeev Rathod	
2000	Hadh Kar Di Aapne	Rajeev Anand and Rakesh Malhotra	Anand Raj Anand	T-Series	2001	Indian		Anand Raj Anand		2002	Mujhse Dosti Karoge!	Yash Raj Films	Rahul Sharma	Saregama & YRF Music
2000	Agniputra		Nikhil–Vinay	Tips Industries	2001	Gadar: Ek Prem Katha	Nitin Keni & Essel Vision	Uttam Singh		2002	Na Tum Jaano Na Hum	PFH Entertainment Limited	Rajesh Roshan Raju Singh.	Saregama
2000	Bulandi	Yogesh Anand	Viju Shah	T-Series	2001	Chhupa Rustam: A Musical Thriller	Seven Arts	Anand–Milind	Saregama	2002	Gunaah		Sajid–Wajid	
					2001	Pyaar Ishq Aur Mohabbat		Viju Shah	Tips Industries	2002	Hum Kisise Kum Nahin		Anu Malik	T-Series
					2001	Nayak		A. R. Rahman	T-Series	2002	Kranti		Jatin–Lalit	
					2001	Aśoka		Anu Malik		2002	Pyaar Diwana Hota Hai	R.B. Choudary	Uttam Singh	
					2001	Yeh Raaste Hain Pyaar Ke	Pradeep Sadarangani & Deepak S. Shivdasani	Darshan Rathod	Tips Industries	2003	Aapko Pehle Bhi Kahin Dekha Hai		Nikhil–Vinay	
										2003	The Hero: Love Story of a Spy		Uttam Singh	
										2003	Chori Chori		Sajid–Wajid	
										2003	Saaya		M. M. Kreem	
										2003	Meri Biwi Ka Jawaab Nahin	S M Iqbal	Laxmikant & Pyarelal	
										2008	Mehbooba		Ismail Darbar	
								2019	Student of the Year 2		R. D. Burman, Vishal–Shekhar			
								2023	Gadar 2		Mithoon, Uttam Singh			
								2024	Crew		Akshay-IP, Laxmikant-Pyarelal			
								2026	Dhurandhar: The Revenge		R. D. Burman			
