= Ajnabee =

Ajnabee, meaning "stranger", may refer to:

- Ajanabee (1974 film), a 1974 Indian film directed by Shakti Samanta, starring Rajesh Khanna and Zeenat Aman
- Ajnabee (2001 film), a 2001 Indian film directed by Abbas-Mustan, starring Akshay Kumar and Kareena Kapoor
- Ek Ajnabee, a 2005 Indian film starring Arjun Rampal and Amitabh Bachchan
