= Kalabaaz =

- Directed by: Ashok Roy
- Written by: S. M. Abbas (Dialogue)
- Screenplay by: Kaul Tarun Sen
- Story by: Tarun Ghosh
- Produced by: Yash Kohli
- Starring: Dev Anand; Zeenat Aman; Pradeep Kumar; Asrani; A. K. Hangal
- Cinematography: D. K. Prabhakar
- Edited by: Babu Sheikh
- Music by: Kalyanji Anandji
- Production company: Pashupati Pictures
- Release date: January 7, 1977 (India)
- Running time: 145 minutes
- Country: India
- Language: Hindi

Kalabaaz is a 1977 Indian Hindi-language film directed by Ashok Roy.

== Plot ==
Trapeze artistes, Vijay and Radha, also known as Lisa, love each other. Radha's father G.D. Sapru manages the circus in which they work. In a daredevil act without any safety net support, Radha misses Vijay, falls down to ground and is hospitalized with serious wounds. Her face is totally disfigured after recovery. She decides to move abroad, not willing to show her disfigured face to Vijay. Meanwhile, a group of Hindu priests ask Vijay to locate for them statues of Shri Krishna and Devi Radha in the mountainous region bordering India and Burma. Vijay agrees to do so and sets out on the mission with Mangu, Changu and Sandoz. On their way, they meet G. D. Sapru with his niece Tina, Radha's look alike and also the dying Poojary.

== Cast ==
- Dev Anand as Vijay
- Zeenat Aman as Lisa/Radha G. Sapru/Tina
- Pradeep Kumar as G. D. Sapru, Circus owner
- Asrani as Changu
- Tarun Ghosh as Mangu
- Hercules as Sandoz
- A. K. Hangal as Poojary
- Dev Kumar as King Mong
- Sujit Kumar as Malhotra
- Mohan Sherry
- Lalita Kumari as Tara
- Ambika Johar - Special Appearance
- Mohammad ali - Special Appearance

== Soundtrack ==
All lyrics are written by Anand Bakshi; all music is composed by Kalyanji Anandji.

Songs
| No. | Title | Playback | Length |
|---|---|---|---|
| 1. | "Are Humse Jo Takrayega" | Kishore Kumar, Asha Bhosle | 4:44 |
| 2. | "Are Roothe Hai To Maan Jayenge" | Kishore Kumar | 5:28 |
| 3. | "Pyara Pyara Sama Hai Pyar Kar Le" | Kishore Kumar | 3:35 |
| 4. | "Pyara Pyara Sama Hai Pyar Kar Le" | Lata Mangeshkar | 3:45 |
