= Dil Toh Deewana Hai =

- Theatrical release poster
- Directed by: Raja Bundela
- Produced by: Deepak Sharma; Aradhana Sharma
- Starring: Hyder Khan; Sadha; Raj Babbar; Zeenat Aman; Sushmita Mukherjee
- Music by: Songs: Zubeen Garg; Anand Raaj Anand; Scores: Zubeen Garg
- Production company: DSA Group
- Release date: 1 July 2016
- Country: India
- Language: Hindi

Dil Toh Deewana Hai (transl. The heart is crazy) is a 2016 Indian Hindi-language romantic comedy film directed by Raja Bundela and produced by Deepak Sharma and Aradhana Sharma. The film features Hyder Khan, Raj Babbar, Zeenat Aman, Sadha and Sushmita Mukherjee. The film music and score were composed by the Zubeen Garg and Anand Raaj Anand.

The film was intended for release in 2009 and was initially rescheduled for 2013. Finally it was released on June 23, 2016. It was considered a commercial failure.

== Plot ==
Raja (Hyder Khan) is a guy who has always remained a 'good friend' to most of the girls, that is if they have not already beaten him up! He has always been shy, never to open his heart out. Raja meets the girl of his dreams Anamika (Sadha) in tube in Malaysia. She is a spoilt, arrogant daughter of a billionaire in Malaysia. As days pass, Raja gets more and more hooked on to her and expresses his feelings to her. This is when his life takes a different turn and he is left on the thresholds of life.

== Cast ==
- Hyder Khan as Raja
- Raj Babbar as Ashok
- Zeenat Aman as Sunita
- Sadha as Anamika
- Sushmita Mukherjee as Shikha
- Alok Nath as Somnath
- Hemant Pandey as Chandu
- Mohsin Khan as Sher Singh
- Shabnam Kapoor as Anits
- Gaurav Ghai as Rajesh
- Shweeta Giri as Anuja
- Mobin Khan as Akshay
- Gauri Sharma as Arpits

== Music ==
Dil Toh Deewana Hai

Soundtrack album by Zubeen Garg and Anand Raj Anand
- Released: 1 June 2016
- Recorded: 2008–2009
- Genre: Feature film soundtrack
- Language: Hindi
- Label: Zee Music Company

Zubeen Garg chronology
Hamari Adhuri Kahaani (2015)	Dil Toh Deewana Hai (2016)	Mission China (2016)

Anand Raj Anand chronology
Mumbai Mirror (2015)	Dil Toh Deewana Hai (2016)	Mastizaade (2016)

The music for Dil Toh Deewana Hai is composed by Zubeen Garg and Anand Raj Anand while the lyrics are written by Kumar Vishwas and Ibrahim Ashk. The music rights are acquired by Zee Music Company. The song is produced by Deepak Sharma and Aradhana Sharma.

The full album soundtrack was supposed to be released in 2009 and then it was rescheduled to 2013 and finally it released on June 1, 2016, for which the music became outdated in 2016 as its being composed and sung in around 2008–09. The song "Dil Toh Deewana Hai" was reused from Zubeen's Assamese song "Aangoli Katilu" in his album Pakhi (2000).

No.	Title	Lyrics	Music	Singer(s)	Length
1.	"Dil Toh Deewana Hai"		Zubeen Garg	Zubeen Garg	4:24
2.	"Kyun Dil Ki Galiyo Mai"	Ibrahim Ashk	Anand Raj Anand	Shreya Ghoshal, Anand Raj Anand	4:05
3.	"Hone Do Romance"		Anand Raj Anand	Anand Raj Anand	4:43
4.	"Dhoop Khile Jab Tum Muskarao"		Anand Raj Anand	Zubeen Garg	4:13
5.	"Raat Bhar Tanha Raha"		Anand Raj Anand	Pankaj Udhas	5:23
6.	"Mujhe Itna Bolna Hai"		Anand Raj Anand	Richa Sharma	3:40
7.	"Saach Hain Aye"	Zubeen Garg	Zubeen Garg	Anand Raj Anand, Richa Sharma	2:14
Total length:					26:28
