= Samraat (film) =

- Theatrical release poster
- Directed by: Mohan Segal
- Written by: Ali Raza
- Produced by: Madan Mohla
- Starring: Dharmendra; Jeetendra; Hema Malini; Zeenat Aman; Amjad Khan
- Cinematography: Kamlakar Rao
- Edited by: Lachhmandas
- Music by: Laxmikant–Pyarelal
- Production company: Seven Arts Pictures
- Release date: 12 November 1982
- Running time: 161 minutes
- Country: India
- Language: Hindi

Samraat is a 1982 Indian Hindi-language action thriller film produced by Madan Mohla under the Seven Arts Pictures banner and directed by Mohan Segal. It stars Dharmendra, Jeetendra, Hema Malini and Zeenat Aman, with music composed by Laxmikant–Pyarelal.

== Cast ==
- Dharmendra as Ram
- Jeetendra as Raju
- Hema Malini as Jennifer Gomes / Jenny
- Zeenat Aman as Suman / Sandhya Chawla
- Amjad Khan as Ranbir
- Kader Khan
- Satyendra Kapoor as Kartar Singh
- Shreeram Lagoo as Gomes
- Om Shivpuri as Captain Chawla
- Shashikala
- Usha Kiran
- Purnima

== Soundtrack ==
Lyrics: Anand Bakshi

| # | Song | Singer |
|---|---|---|
| 1 | "Meri Patli Kamar Mein Haath Daal De" | Kishore Kumar, Asha Bhosle |
| 2 | "Upar Zameen, Neeche Aasman" | Kishore Kumar, Asha Bhosle |
| 3 | "Panja, Chhakka, Satta Pad Gaya, Patta Pad Gaya" | Kishore Kumar, Asha Bhosle, Shailendra Singh |
| 4 | "Kal Na Maana, Parson Na Maana" | Lata Mangeshkar |
| 5 | "Aankhon Ka Salaam Lo" | Lata Mangeshkar, Mohammed Rafi, Manna Dey |
| 6 | "Meri Jaan, Tujhe Mere Haathon Marna Hai" | Asha Bhosle |
