= Yaadon Ki Kasam =

- Poster
- Directed by: Vinod Dewan
- Produced by: T C Dewan
- Starring: Mithun Chakraborty; Zeenat Aman; Shakti Kapoor; Asrani; Madan Puri; Viju Khote
- Music by: Laxmikant Pyarelal
- Release date: 17 May 1985
- Running time: 125 min.
- Language: Hindi

Yaadon Ki Kasam (1985) is an Indian Hindi-language action film directed by Vinod Dewan, starring Mithun Chakraborty, Zeenat Aman, Shakti Kapoor, Asrani, Madan Puri and Viju Khote

== Summary ==
Ravi Kapoor and Chandni, a mute tribe girl, get intimate, but are separated by fate. Ravi believes that Chandni is dead. Ravi then meets the liberated Geeta Khanna, in Mumbai. Geeta is a look-alike of Chandni but her character is the opposite. Ravi falls in love with her and marriage follows. When a young boy addresses Geeta as his mother Ravi must find out the truth. Who this child is forms the climax.

== Cast ==
- Mithun Chakraborty as Ravi Kapoor
- Zeenat Aman as Chandni/ Geeta Khanna
- Shakti Kapoor
- Asrani
- Madan Puri as Bishambharnath Kapoor
- Sudhir Dalvi as Chandni's father
- Ashalata Wabgaonkar as Gayatri Kapoor
- Shafi Inamdar as Ravi's Manager
- Yunus Parvez
- Viju Khote
- Alka Kapoor

== Soundtrack ==
The music was composed by Laxmikant-Pyarelal and lyrics were penned by Anand Bakshi.

#	Song	Singer
1	Baith Mere Paas	Lata Mangeshkar
2	Baith Mere Paas	Suresh Wadkar
3	O Champa Chameli	Suresh Wadkar
4	Taarif Us Khuda Ki	Suresh Wadkar
5	Chaman Chaman, O Jaaneman	Shabbir Kumar, Anuradha Paudwal
