= Strings of Passion =

- Directed by: Sanghamitra Chaudhari
- Written by: Sanghamitra Chaudhari
- Produced by: Tricolours Entertainment; Mithuntara Movies; Eon Films
- Starring: Zeenat Aman; Indrani Haldar; Rajesh Sharma; Shubh Mukherjee; Avalok Nagpal; Paru Gambhir; Amit Sarkar; Sangita Sonali
- Music by: Dev Sikdar
- Release date: 17 January 2014
- Running time: 100 minutes
- Country: India
- Languages: Hindi; Bengali

Strings of Passion is a Bollywood drama film released on 17 January 2014. It was directed by Sanghamitra Chaudhari and stars Zeenat Aman, Indrani Haldar, Shubh Mukherjee and Rajesh Sharma.

== Plot ==
Strings of Passion is an urban commercial flick that tells the story of three men, Neel, Aman, and Amit. They are young and dynamic guys who run the band "Strings of Passion" but are shadowed by the influence of drugs, broken love, and bad parenting.

== Cast ==
- Zeenat Aman
- Indrani Haldar
- Rajesh Sharma
- Shubh Mukherjee
- Ekavali Khanna
- Avlok Nagpal
- Paru Gambhir
- Amit Sarkar
- Sangita Sonali
- Mishti in an item number

== Soundtrack ==
No.	Title	Length
1.	"Bhenge Mor Ghorer Chabi"
