= Tyaag (1977 film) =

- Poster
- Directed by: Din Dayal Sharma; Desh Mukherjee (art director)
- Written by: Din Dayal Sharma
- Produced by: N.S. Kabir; Sharmila Tagore (co-producer)
- Starring: Rajesh Khanna; Sharmila Tagore
- Cinematography: Aloke Dasgupta
- Edited by: B.S. Glaad
- Music by: Sachin Dev Burman
- Release date: March 4, 1977
- Country: India
- Language: Hindi

Tyaag (transl. Sacrifice) is a 1977 Bollywood film directed by Din Dayal Sharma. The film stars Rajesh Khanna and Sharmila Tagore in lead roles. The film was produced by Sharmila Tagore's secretary, N.S. Kabir, and was co-produced by Sharmila Tagore. Rajesh Khanna's real-life secretary Gurnam Singh played the side kick Bansi to Khanna's character Chetan in this film. The film was critically acclaimed and given four stars by critics upon its release in Bollywood Guide Collections. It was the last film to be released of S.D. Burman as music director. This film was not commercially successful at the time of its release. However, over the years this film has gained a cult following in its screening on television.

== Plot ==
The story begins in the Central Jail, where a prisoner is planned to be hanged next day morning and he is very much afraid of dying. His fears are soothed by another inmate named Chetan who tells him that he is not dying but starting a new life elsewhere in a body free from sin. The concept comforts the prisoner and makes him happy. Chetan's 10-year-long sentence for murder is to be ended by an early release for good behavior. The Jailor is curious as to how such an empathetic and honest man like Chetan got to be a murderer, so asks him to explain. And Chetan starts disclosing his past.

Chetan is a penniless poet while Sunita is the daughter of a wealthy man. Both are very much in love. Chetan wants to continue writing books and develop his habit of writing stories with Sunita's full support. Sunita fears to talk before her father. Her rich father wouldn't allow any poor guy marry his daughter because when he was a poor man himself, his wife died, for he couldn't afford proper medical service for her. So Sunita's father has throughout his life dedicated on earning more money for a secure future, but all at the cost of his personal disconnection from Sunita.

Sunita's father decides to marry her to Gopal, a doctor. Gopal and his mother meet Sunita in her house for the first time and they like her. Her dad decides to announce their engagement at the birthday party. Meanwhile, Sunita urges Chetan to ask her hand from her father on her birthday and invites him to the party. At the party her father is rude to Chetan and then announces engagement to Gopal.

Sunita urges Chetan that they should elope and be away from her parents and live in a world of their own. Chetan replies why to elope, when they can go together to her father and tell him they want to marry and that Chetan will take care of Sunita. Sunita agrees to this, but fears that her father may attack or kill Chetan. Chetan replies that it is completely unethical to run away from problems and it would bring dishonour to Sunita and to their love story and society could disapprove it. To this, Sunita declares that Chetan is cowardly and selfish and does not want to share a bit of risk by running away, when she is ready to leave her wealth and family behind. Sunita says she did not think of anything except her love for Chetan. So she angrily tells Chetan that she would now marry Gopal only, just because Chetan has belittled their love.

Sunita marries Gopal and they live happily, but one day discloses to her husband that she was in love with a person in her college days. Gopal gets mad at this so starts drinking liquor and goes off to England for years to further his medical studies, abandoning Sunita to bring up their son Munna.

Chetan, meanwhile, channels his despair into writing and becomes critically renowned. His greatest novel becomes Tyaag—the story of his romance with Sunita. Five years after Sunita's marriage Gopal decides to return to India as he by now reckons that Sunita is a good mother and a good daughter-in-law and decides to mend their married life.

Sunita's child then runs away from home to search his father and boards a train. There, he meets a passenger who turns out to be Chetan. Chetan seeing child's innocence, decides to lodge a police complaint. But the child is very hyperactive, decides to run away from him. Yet Chetan catches him and Munna agrees to go home now, so Chetan takes him home.

Sunita gets angry on seeing Chetan. She tries her best to throw him out of her life. The rest of the story deals with dilemmas: Will Chetan avenge his failed love affair with her by destroying her present married life? Will Chetan make use of Gopal's absence to molest her? What will follow on Gopal's return?

== Cast ==
- Rajesh Khanna as Chetan
- Sharmila Tagore as Sunita
- Prem Chopra as Mahinder
- Kamal Kapoor as Sharmila's father
- Dheeraj Kumar as Gopal
- Sulochana Latkar as Gopal's mother
- Mukri as Mangal Dada
- Murad as Police officer
- Raza Murad as Jail inmate
- Asit Sen
- Bindu as Dancer
- Tito Khatri (Master Tito) as adolescent Pappu and later grown up is Satyajeet Puri

== Soundtrack ==
Tyaag

Soundtrack album by S.D. Burman
- Released: March 4, 1977
- Genre: Feature film soundtrack
- Length: 24:01
- Language: Hindi
- Label: Universal Music India
- Producer: S.D. Burman

S.D. Burman chronology
Deewaangee (1976)	Tyaag (1977)

Anand Bakshi has written all the lyrics, and S. D. Burman has composed the music. This movie marked the final release featuring S.D. Burman as music director.

Songs
No.	Title	Singer(s)	Length
1.	"Man Pukare"	Kishore Kumar and Lata Mangeshkar	6:05
2.	"Kore Kagaz Pe Likhwale"	Kishore Kumar and Asha Bhosle	5:19
3.	"Ek Raja Ka Ek Beta Tha"	Kishore Kumar and Sushma Shrestha	4:43
4.	"Hum Tum Hai Tum Hum"	Kishore Kumar and Lata Mangeshkar	3:26
5.	"Tujhe Pyaas Hai"	Asha Bhosle	4:26
6.	"Hum Tum Hai (Version 2)"	Kishore Kumar, Lata Mangeshkar
Total length:			24:01
