= The Evil Within (1970 film) =

- Film poster
- Directed by: Lamberto V. Avellana
- Produced by: Rolf Bayer
- Starring: Dev Anand; Kieu Chinh; Rod Perry; Zeenat Aman; Prem Nath; M. B. Shetty
- Cinematography: Fali Mistry
- Distributed by: 20th Century Fox
- Release date: 1970
- Countries: India; Philippines; United States
- Language: English

The Evil Within (also known as ′Passport to Danger′) is a 1970 drama film directed by Lamberto V. Avellana and starring Dev Anand and Zeenat Aman.

== Plot ==
The film consists of a layered narrative and lots of shades of gray. A palace intrigue meets the corporate mechanism of a criminal enterprise to gain more profit. The police have their own orders and the organized crime division their own. All make deals to further their own cause.

== Cast ==
- Dev Anand as Dev Verma, an Interpol agent
- Kieu Chinh as Kamar Souria, a princess of Burma
- Rod Perry as Rod Stevens
- Zeenat Aman as Reeta
- Prem Nath as Krishna
- M. B. Shetty as Sheety
- Sudesh Issar
