= Mahaan (1983 film) =

- Film poster
- Directed by: S. Ramanathan
- Written by: M. D. Sundar; Dialogues: Kader Khan
- Based on: Shankar Guru by V. Somashekhar
- Produced by: Satyanarayana; A. Suryanarayana
- Starring: Amitabh Bachchan; Waheeda Rehman; Parveen Babi; Zeenat Aman; Ashok Kumar; Amjad Khan; Aruna Irani; Shakti Kapoor; Kader Khan
- Cinematography: A. Vincent
- Music by: R. D. Burman
- Production company: Satya Chitra International
- Distributed by: Shemaroo Entertainment
- Release date: 29 April 1983
- Running time: 172 minutes
- Country: India
- Language: Hindi

Mahaan (transl. Great) is a 1983 Hindi-language action thriller film produced by Satyanarayana and Suryanarayana and directed by S. Ramanathan. The film stars Amitabh Bachchan in a triple role alongside Waheeda Rehman, Parveen Babi, Zeenat Aman, Ashok Kumar, Amjad Khan, Kader Khan, Aruna Irani, Sujit Kumar and Shakti Kapoor. The music is by R.D. Burman. The film is an official remake of the 1978 Kannada film Shankar Guru.

== Synopsis ==
Vikram Singh is framed for possession of drugs but claims he was framed by a business associate named Rajan. After release from prison, he kills Rajan and frames his former lawyer Amit. Amit is forced to go on the run, while his pregnant wife Janki gives birth to twin sons Guru and Shankar. Unfortunately, she becomes separated from one of her sons Guru when her son is stolen by a barren couple. With her husband on the run and one son missing, Janki is forced to raise Shankar on her own. Amit thinks his wife Janki is dead so he tries to lead a normal life using the name Rana Ranveer and is living with his adopted daughter Manju. But Janki is living in another city with Shankar who has become a police inspector. Guru had been brought up by a barren couple and grows up to be a theatre actor and pursued by Rita. Manju meets and falls in love with Shankar, unaware that he is Rana Ranveer's long lost son. At the end, their lives intertwine and all are reunited and become a family again.

== Cast ==
- Amitabh Bachchan as Rana Ranveer Singh (Amit)/ Inspector Shankar Singh / Guru Singh
- Waheeda Rehman as Janki
- Zeenat Aman as Rita
- Parveen Babi as Manju
- Ashok Kumar as Rai Sahib
- Amjad Khan as Vikram Singh
- Shakti Kapoor as Prem Singh
- Kader Khan as Simon Sardar
- Aruna Irani as Tara
- Sujit Kumar as Rajan
- Iftekhar as Police Chief
- Mukri as Guru's foster father
- Urmila Bhatt as Guru's foster mother
- Mac Mohan as henchman
- Pakhi
- Nandita Thakur
- Babbanlal Yadav
- Harish Magon

== Soundtrack ==
All lyrics by Anjaan.

#	Song	Singer
1	"Jidhar Dekhoon Teri Tasveer"	Kishore Kumar
2	"Aadhi Baat Ho Chuki"	Kishore Kumar
3	"Har Chhori Rani Hiyaan"	Kishore Kumar
4	"Pyar Mein Dil Pe Maar De Goli"	Kishore Kumar, Asha Bhosle
5	"Asli Kya Hai, Naqli Kya Hai"	Kishore Kumar, Amit Kumar
6	"Yeh Din To Aata Hai Ek Din Jawaani Mein"	R. D. Burman, Asha Bhosle
7	"Jidhar Dekhoon Teri Tasveer"	Amitabh Bachchan
