= Vakil Babu =

Vakil Baboo
- Directed by: Asit Sen
- Written by: Inder Raj Anand
- Produced by: Jawahar Kapoor; P. K. Luthra
- Starring: Raj Kapoor; Shashi Kapoor; Zeenat Aman; Rakesh Roshan
- Music by: Laxmikant-Pyarelal
- Release date: 9 April 1982
- Country: India
- Language: Hindi

Vakil Baboo is a 1982 Hindi film, produced by Jawahar Kapoor and P. K. Luthra and directed by Asit Sen. The film stars Raj Kapoor alongside his younger brother Shashi Kapoor and also features Zeenat Aman, Rakesh Roshan, Rehman, Aruna Irani, Kader Khan. This was Raj Kapoor's last leading film role and was also the first and only time he appeared onscreen along with his brother Shashi Kapoor, not counting Aag and Awara, wherein Shashi Kapoor appeared as a child actor.

== Plot ==
Famous sculptor Shekhar Kumar gets wrongly accused for the murder of Prem Oberoi, a man who was lustful towards his wife Kalpana. Judge Rajvansh hires an ordinary advocate, Satyaprakash Mathur, as defence lawyer for Shekhar. Mathur investigates the case and finds out that Steward Suresh Talwar had actually murdered Prem on finding out that Prem was previously in a relationship with Suresh's fiance, Shanti. Later he also murdered Shanti as she had witnessed his crime. At last, Shekhar is acquitted of all charges.

== Cast ==
- Raj Kapoor as Advocate Satyaprakash Mathur
- Shashi Kapoor as Shekhar Kumar
- Zeenat Aman as Kalpana Chaudhary
- Rakesh Roshan as Prem Oberoi
- Rehman as Public Prosecutor Khan
- Kishore Sahu as Judge Rajvansh
- Agha as Shekhar's Assistant
- Jalal Agha as Anil Kumar Shrivastav
- Anju Mahendru as Shanti
- Aruna Irani as Munni Bai
- Kader Khan as Man at Court House
- Pinchoo Kapoor as Captain Chaudhary

== Music ==
The music for this film was composed by Laxmikant-Pyarelal and penned by Anand Bakshi.

Song	Singer
"Hum Kahan Kho Gaye"	Lata Mangeshkar
"Dil Mein Sholay"	Lata Mangeshkar
"Aa Gayi Jawani"	Asha Bhosle
"Ae Musafiron"	Asha Bhosle
