= Sallu Ki Shaadi =

Sallu ki Shaadi
- Directed by: Mohammad Israr Ansari
- Screenplay by: Mohammad Israr Ansari; Amit Jha; Vivek Modi
- Produced by: Mohammad Israr Ansari
- Starring: Kashyap Barbhaya; Arshin Mehta; Kiran Kumar; Asrani; Sandeep Anand; Razzak Khan; Ravi Pandey; Ranjana Khatiwada; Arvind Kumar; Valentina; Zeenat Aman
- Cinematography: Danial Gomes
- Edited by: JD Singh; Vimal Kumawat; Siddhartha Das
- Music by: Prashant Singh; Manu Rajeev
- Production companies: Aman Films Production; Angel's Production; Brosis Production House; Worldwide Records
- Distributed by: Admant Picture
- Release date: 8 December 2017
- Country: India
- Language: Hindi

Sallu ki Shaadi (transl. Sallu's Wedding) is an Indian Hindi-language romantic action film directed by Mohammad Israr Ansari. The film stars Kashyap Barbhaya, Arshin Mehta, Zeenat Aman and Asrani, with Razak Khan and Kiran Kumar in supporting roles. Dedicated to Salman Khan (also known as Sallu), Sallu ki Shaadi was released on 8 December 2017.

== Release ==
The film was released worldwide on 8 December 2017.

== Plot ==
Zeenat and Shahnawaz meet each other at a film theatre in 1989, during a screening of Salman Khan's Maine Pyar Kiya, and fall in love. They marry, and live happily with their children Sallu and Ilmi, until Shahnawaz dies of cancer. Twenty years later, Zeenat wants to honour Shahnawaz's final wish, which is to find a suitable girl for their son Sallu and get him married. The only problem is that Sallu is a die-hard fan of his namesake and has resolved that he will remain a bachelor for as long as his idol does.

== Cast ==
- Kashyap Barbhaya as Sallu
- Zeenat Aman as Sallu's Mother
- Kiran Kumar as Sallu's Father
- Asrani
- Razzak Khan
- Arvind Kumar
- Arshin Mehta
- Ravi Pandey
- Ranjana Khatiwada
- sameeksha sud
- Gauahar Khan
- Sandeep Anand
- Sandeep Singh Bhadouria
- Vivek Modi as Guilty Man

== Soundtrack ==
Sallu Ki Shadi

Soundtrack album by Nakash Aziz, Manu Rajeev
- Released: 25 November 2017
- Genre: Feature film soundtrack
- Length: 21:37
- Language: Hindi
- Label: T-Series

Nakash Aziz, Manu Rajeev chronology
Tumhari Sulu (2017)	Sallu Ki Shadi (2017)	Ram Ratan (2017)

=== Track listing ===
No.	Title	Length
1.	"Hukka"	04:23
3.	"Bismil Hai"	03:28
4.	"Sallu Ki Shaadi-Title Track"	03:46
