= Gawaahi =

1989 Bollywood film by Anant Balani

- Directed by: Anant Balani
- Written by: Hemendra Bhatia (dialogues)
- Based on: The Night of January 16th by Ayn Rand
- Produced by: Rajiv Mehra; Aditya Raj Kapoor
- Starring: Zeenat Aman; Shekhar Kapur; Ranjeeta Kaur; Ashutosh Gowariker
- Cinematography: Nagarajan Lingam
- Edited by: Rajendra Mahajan
- Music by: Uttam-Jagdish; Sardar Anjum (lyrics)
- Release date: 1989 (India)
- Country: India
- Language: Hindi

Gawaahi (English: Testimony) is a 1989 Bollywood film directed by Anant Balani. It was his directorial debut. The film stars Zeenat Aman, Shekhar Kapur, Ranjeeta Kaur and Ashutosh Gowariker. It was based on the 1934 play The Night of January 16th, a courtroom drama by Ayn Rand.

== Plot ==
A courtroom drama around the disclosures and cross-examinations of key witnesses of mysterious death of leading business tycoon Ranjeet Chaudhary (Shekhar Kapoor).

== Cast ==
- Zeenat Aman as Janhvi Kaul
- Tanuja as Advocate Bharucha
- Shekhar Kapur as Ranjeet Chaudhary
- Ranjeeta Kaur as Shashi Chaudhary
- Ashutosh Gowariker as Sayed Akhtar Rampuri
- Vikram Gokhale as Prosecutor Tiwari
- Vivek Vaswani as Tejchand Advani
- Avinash Kharshikar as Ramakant Shinde
- Hosi Vasunia as Inspector Vasunia
- Shammi as Betty Lobo
- Ravi Patwardhan as Judge
- G.P. Singh as Colonel Ghai
- Rakesh Shrivastav as building watchman
- Gautam Siddharth as handwriting expert

== Soundtrack ==
All lyrics are written by Sardar Anjum; all music is composed by Uttam-Jagdish.

No.	Title	Singer(s)	Length
1.	"Bhool Bhulaiyya Sa Yeh Jeevan"	Pankaj Udhas, Anuradha Paudwal
2.	"Dekh Ke Tumko"	Pankaj Udhas, Anuradha Paudwal
3.	"Dil Ki Baatein Hain"	Pankaj Udhas, Anuradha Paudwal
4.	"Khat Mein Likha Hai"	Anuradha Paudwal
