= Heeralaal Pannalaal (film) =

- Directed by: Ashok Roy
- Written by: Rajeev Kaul; S. M. Abbas
- Produced by: Ashok Roy
- Starring: Shashi Kapoor; Randhir Kapoor; Zeenat Aman; Neetu Singh
- Music by: R. D. Burman
- Release date: 9 October 1978
- Country: India
- Language: Hindi

Heeralaal Pannalaal is a 1978 Indian Hindi-language action comedy film directed and produced by Ashok Roy. The film has ensemble starcast such as Shashi Kapoor, Randhir Kapoor, Zeenat Aman, Neetu Singh, with Premnath, Ranjeet, Ajit, Amjad Khan, Madan Puri, Kamini Kaushal in supporting roles.

== Plot ==
The film starts with two innocent and kind-hearted guys named Heeralal and Pannalal. They are famous among criminals as they have helped police in capturing them several times. Heeralal is in search of his parents' killer, but is unaware of his identity. Pannalal is in search of his father. Heeralal meets with a girl named Ruby and falls in love with her. Pannalal falls in love with Ruby's friend, Neelam.

Kalicharan, who is a renowned criminal has decided to teach a lesson to Heeralal and Pannalal for interfering in their business. But instead Kalicharan is forced to run from the police. Police Commissioner, Premlal is very happy with the guys and wants to protect them from Kalicharan and his friend, Panther. They find that Kalicharan was the one who killed Heeralal's parents, but surprisingly, Kalicharan is none other than Pannalal's father.

Heeralal and Pannalal rescue the people who were caught in a fire. In the end, Heeralal-Ruby and Pannalal-Neelam unite.

== Cast ==
- Shashi Kapoor as Heeralal
- Randhir Kapoor as Pannalal
- Zeenat Aman as Ruby
- Neetu Singh as Neelam
- Premnath as Police Commissioner Premlal
- Ranjeet as Jaggu
- Ajit as Kalicharan
- Amjad Khan as Panther
- Madan Puri as Advocate
- Padma Khanna as Bijli
- Kamini Kaushal as Mrs. Premlal
- Asrani as Inspector Anand
- Ramesh Deo as Inspector Samant
- Murad as Police Commissioner Ram Singh

== Soundtrack ==
Song	Singer
"O Padosan Ki Ladki"	Kishore Kumar
"Main Dhal Gayi Rang Mein Tere, Tu Razi Hai Ab To"	Kishore Kumar, Asha Bhosle
"Kahiye Kahan Se Aana Hua, Chehra To Hai Pehchaana Hua, Sochiye Nai Baat Koi, Ab Yeh Mazaaq Purana Hua"	Kishore Kumar, Bhupinder Singh, Lata Mangeshkar, Asha Bhosle
"Seedhe Raste Chaloge Toh"	Kishore Kumar, Mohammed Rafi
"Aaja Mere Pyar Aaja" (Solo)	Hemant Kumar
"Aaja Mere Pyar Aaja, Dekh Aise Na Sata" (Duet)	Rahul Dev Burman, Asha Bhosle
