= Deewaangee =

- Audio Cassette Cover
- Directed by: Samir Ganguly
- Written by: Anand Dutta; Sneh Dutta (story idea)
- Produced by: Subodh Mukherjee
- Starring: Shashi Kapoor; Zeenat Aman; Ranjeet; Narendra Nath; Helen
- Cinematography: N.V. Srinivas
- Edited by: V.K. Naik
- Music by: Ravindra Jain; Sachin Dev Burman
- Release date: 1976
- Country: India
- Language: Hindi

Deewaangee is a 1976 Hindi crime drama film produced by Subodh Mukherjee and directed by Samir Ganguly, the film stars Shashi Kapoor, Zeenat Aman, Ranjeet, Narendra Nath and Helen. The film's music is composed by Ravindra Jain and Sachin Dev Burman and the lyrics by Anand Bakshi, Ravindra Jain and Naqsh Lyallpuri.

== Plot ==
This is the story of a woman who protects her family, after losing their property and money and the story of a man who thinks money is everything.

== Cast ==
- Shashi Kapoor as Shekhar
- Zeenat Aman as Kanchan
- Ranjeet as Harry
- Helen as Kitty
- Mehmood Jr. as Birju
- Madan Puri as George
- Raju Shrestha as Baabla
- Narendra Nath as Munne Khan
- Manju Asrani as Ruby
- Viju Khote as Shekhar's friend
- Raj Kishore as Stage actor

== Soundtrack ==
Deewaangee

Soundtrack album by S.D. Burman & Ravindra Jain
- Released: December 1, 1976
- Genre: Feature film soundtrack
- Length: 29:55
- Language: Hindi
- Label: Saregama
- Producer: S.D. Burman

S.D. Burman chronology
| Arjun Pandit (1976) | Deewaangee (1976) | Tyaag (1977) |

Songs
| No. | Title | Lyrics | Music | Singer(s) | Length |
|---|---|---|---|---|---|
| 1. | "Chal Sapnon Ke Shahar Mein" | Anand Bakshi | S. D. Burman | Kishore Kumar | 3:58 |
| 2. | "Hasinon Ke Chakkar Men Padna Nahin" | Ravindra Jain | Ravindra Jain | Kishore Kumar and Amit Kumar | 5:53 |
| 3. | "Meri Jawani Kare Ishare" | Naqsh Lyallpuri | Ravindra Jain | Asha Bhosle | 3:55 |
| 4. | "Pooja Ki Vidhi Na Janoon" | Ravindra Jain | Ravindra Jain | Lata Mangeshkar | 4:41 |
| 5. | "Woh Bhi Mujhse Karne Lage Hain" | Ravindra Jain | Ravindra Jain | Asha Bhosle | 5:41 |
| 6. | "Zamana Munh Dekhta Rah Gaya" | Hasrat Jaipuri | Ravindra Jain | Kishore Kumar & Lata Mangeshkar | 5:44 |
| Total length: | | | | | 29:55 |
