= Prem Shastra =

- Poster
- Directed by: B. R. Ishara
- Written by: B. R. Ishara
- Produced by: Amarjeet
- Starring: Dev Anand; Zeenat Aman; Bindu
- Cinematography: Faredoon Irani
- Edited by: I. M. Kunnu
- Music by: Laxmikant–Pyarelal
- Production company: Nalanda Pictures
- Distributed by: Nalanda Pictures
- Release date: 1974
- Country: India
- Language: Hindi

Prem Shastra (transl. Love Scriptures) is a 1974 Indian Hindi-language film written and directed by B. R. Ishara. The film stars Dev Anand, Zeenat Aman and Bindu.

== Plot ==
Sagar Sharma (Dev Anand) is a popular author and a favourite among women. During one of his trips to a location to gather inspiration for a plot for his next novel, he autographs one of his previous novels for an admirer called Barkha (Zeenat Aman). Sagar and Barkha fall in love and begin an intimate relationship. Later due to the pressures he faces in his life, Sagar requests Barkha to forget him. Diwan (Asit Sen), who publishes Sagar's novels, informs him that one of his best-sellers was receiving backlashes as it focused on an affair between a father and a daughter, and that it has led many women activists to ask for a ban on the book. Unperturbed, Sagar decides to defy them by moving to court, if necessary.

Sagar returns home and Neelima (Bindu), his wife who is a drunk and spoiled. Both are not in love with each other. Suddenly, Barkha, who is pregnant, visits Nilu. Nilu introduces her to Sagar as her sister. Sagar visits his gynaecologist, who informs him that Barkha is preparing for an abortion. Sagar visits Barkha and requests her not to undergo an abortion. It is revealed that Nilu blackmailed Sagar into marry her. The two then argue, during which Neelima says Barkha is Sagar’s elder brother’s (Abhi Bhattacharya) daughter. A desperate Sagar visits his elder brother to discover Neelima had lied. The climax develops with flashbacks of Neelima’s past when she was Miss India in 1951. She had affairs with three rich people, of which she marries Rajan Arora (Rehman). Desperate to ruin Sagar and Barkha's relationship, Neelima even appoints a hardcore criminal, Lallan (Anwar Hussain), to kill them. A gripping court room climax reveals the truth and Sagar is united with Barkha.

== Cast ==
- Dev Anand as Sagar Sharma
- Zeenat Aman as Barkha Arora (Suman)
- Bindu as Neelima Sharma
- I. S. Johar as Malhotra
- Abhi Bhattacharya as Sagar’s elder brother
- Asit Sen as Diwan
- Anwar Hussain as Lallan
- Rehman as Rajan Arora
- Anju Mahendru as Barkha Arora
- David as Anthony D'Souza

== Soundtrack ==
Prem Shastra

Soundtrack album by Laxmikant–Pyarelal
- Released: 1974
- Producer: Laxmikant–Pyarelal

The music was composed by Laxmikant–Pyarelal while Anand Bakshi wrote the lyrics. On the album, film critic Suresh Kohli of The Hindu wrote that the songs by Kishore Kumar and Asha Bhosle were "mediocre". He found the title background score to be "memorable".

All lyrics are written by Anand Bakshi; all music is composed by Laxmikant–Pyarelal.

No.	Title	Singer(s)	Length
1.	"Mai Sharab Pee Raha Hoon"	Kishore Kumar	2:23
2.	"Mujhe Pyaar Kar"	Kishore Kumar, Asha Bhosle	4:18
3.	"Naam Hamara Mashur Ho Gaya"	Kishore Kumar, Asha Bhosle	2:54
4.	"Mein Hu Dekhne Ki Cheez Mujhe Baar Baar Dekh"	Asha Bhosle	3:27
5.	"Tip Tip, Tip"	Asha Bhosle	3:48

== Reception ==
Kohli wrote that if the film was "scripted and filmed sans the sexual angles would have surely hit the bull’s eye at the box office."
