= The Great Gambler =

1979 film

- Film poster
- Directed by: Shakti Samanta
- Written by: C. J. Pavri (adaptation); Vrajendra Gaur (dialogues)
- Screenplay by: Shakti Samanta; Ranjan Bose
- Story by: Vikramaditya (Bengali novel)
- Produced by: C. V. K. Shastri
- Starring: Amitabh Bachchan; Zeenat Aman; Neetu Singh; Prem Chopra
- Cinematography: Aloke Dasgupta
- Edited by: R. P. Bapat; Pran Mehra
- Music by: R. D. Burman
- Release date: 6 April 1979
- Running time: 163 minutes
- Country: India
- Language: Hindi

The Great Gambler is a 1979 Indian Hindi-language crime action film co-written, directed and produced by Shakti Samanta, under his banner of Shakti Films. Based on Vikramaditya's Bengali novel Great Gambler, the film stars Amitabh Bachchan in dual roles, alongside Zeenat Aman, Neetu Singh, Prem Chopra, Utpal Dutt and Madan Puri in pivotal roles. Its story follows international gangsters, spies, and secret agents of different countries' intelligence agencies and their undercover operations.

The film marks the first collaboration between Samanta and Bachchan, having high production costs with a significant portions being shot in international locations including Cairo, Lisbon, Venice, and Rome, and in India, many scenes were shot in Goa. The film was a box-office flop on initial release due to high distribution price, but has been widely appreciated for its action, direction, and cinematography. Later, it became profitable on repeat releases and attained cult status.

== Plot ==
Jay is an expert gambler, been for as long as he can remember, and has never lost a game. These skills bring him to the attention of the underworld don Ratan Das, who is interested in hiring him to win large amounts of money from rich people and then influencing them into doing whatever he wants. Jay agrees to do so and plays successfully, though unknowingly to entrap Nath, who works for the government. After losing large amounts of money, he is blackmailed into revealing the blueprints of a top-secret military laser weapon that can hit any target within 50 miles and is wanted by an underworld don named Saxena. When the Indian police come to know of this, they assign the case to Inspector Vijay, who is a lookalike of Jay.

Jay and Vijay's paths are soon intertwined when they both travel to Rome with separate missions. Vijay is sent to retrieve the evidence against underworld don Saxena by one of his former henchmen, and Jay is onto a money-making scheme where he would marry Mala to inherit her money. Mala, however, meets Vijay at the Rome airport and Vijay decides to go along with this to find out who his lookalike is. Jai meets Shabnam, a club dancer who mistakes him for Vijay and was sent by Saxena to stop him on his mission to discover Saxena's plans. Jay and Vijay are late revealed to be actually long-lost twin brothers, and together they team up to stop Saxena from retrieving the laser weapon.

== Cast ==
- Amitabh Bachchan as Jay / CID Inspector Vijay (Double role)
- Zeenat Aman as Shabnam
- Neetu Singh as Mala
- Prem Chopra as Ramesh / Abbasi
- Utpal Dutt as Mr. Saxena
- Madan Puri as Ratan Das
- Sujit Kumar as Macroni
- Roopesh Kumar as Sethi
- Helen as Monica
- Iftekhar as Deepchand
- Jagdish Raj as Nath
- Om Shivpuri as CID Head Sen Verma

== Production ==
Amjad Khan was initially cast as the character Saxena; due to a road accident, he was unable to continue, and was replaced by Utpal Dutt.

== Music ==
All lyrics were written by Anand Bakshi. Music was composed by R. D. Burman.

No.	Title	Singer(s)	Length
1.	"Pehle Pehle Pyar Ki Mulaqaten Yaad Hai"	Kishore Kumar, Asha Bhosle
2.	"Tum Kitne Din Baad Mile"	Asha Bhosle
3.	"Raqqasa Mera Naam, Ae Sahib Sabko Salaam"	Asha Bhosle, Mohammed Rafi
4.	"O Deewanon, Dil Sambhalo"	Asha Bhosle
5.	"Do Lafzon Ki Hai Dil Ki Kahani"	Asha Bhosle, Amitabh Bachchan

The song "Do Lafzon Ki Hai Dil Ki Kahani" was shot on a Gondola in Venice's Grand Canal. The mandolin in this song was played by Arvind Haldipur. The song was featured in the opening scene of the 2025 film The Monkey.
