= Adventures of Ali-Baba and the Forty Thieves (film) =

Adventures of Ali-Baba and the Forty Thieves Приключения Али-Бабы и сорока разбойников
- India theatrical release poster
- Alibaba aur 40 Chor
- Directed by: Umesh Mehra (Hindi); Latif Faiziev (Russian)
- Screenplay by: Shanti Prakash Bakshi; Boris Saakov
- Dialogues by: Javed Siddiqui (Hindi); Boris Saakov (Russian)
- Story by: Shanti Prakash Bakshi; Boris Saakov
- Based on: Ali Baba and the Forty Thieves (Arabian Nights)
- Produced by: F. C. Mehra
- Starring: Dharmendra; Hema Malini; Zeenat Aman; Yoqub Ahmedov; Rolan Bykov; Sofiko Chiaureli; Elena Sanayeva
- Cinematography: Leonid Travitsky; Peter Pereira
- Edited by: M. S. Shinde (Hindi); M. Makarova (Russian)
- Music by: Score: Vladimir Milov; Songs: R. D. Burman
- Production companies: Eagle Films; Uzbekfilm
- Distributed by: India: Eagle Films; Soviet Union: Uzbekfilm
- Release date: 30 May 1980
- Running time: 153 minutes
- Countries: India; Soviet Union
- Languages: Hindi; Russian
- Box office: est. $28.13 million (₹221.13 million)

Adventures of Ali-Baba and the Forty Thieves (Hindi: Alibaba aur 40 Chor; Russian: Приключения Али-Бабы и сорока разбойников, romanized: Priklucheniya Ali-Baby i soroka razboynikov) is a 1980 Indo-Soviet fantasy film based on the Arabian Nights story of Ali Baba and the Forty Thieves. The film is a joint directorial effort between India's Umesh Mehra and the Soviet Union's Latif Faiziev.

The film stars Dharmendra, Hema Malini, Zeenat Aman, Yoqub Ahmedov, Rolan Bykov, Sofiko Chiaureli, Elena Sanayeva, and Zakir Mukhamedzhanov. The storyline is slightly altered to extend as a long movie. The writers are Shanti Prakash Bakshi and Boris Saakov.

The background score of the film is composed by Vladimir Milov and the music for the songs is composed by R.D. Burman. The choreographers of the film are Leonid Travitsky and Peter Pereira. It was the most successful Indian-Soviet co-production, becoming a success in both India and the Soviet Union.

== Plot ==
Alibaba, a poor man, lives in the fictional town of Gulabad, somewhere in Central Asia, with his mother and elder brother Qasim, who owns a small shop. Ali's father, Yousuf, is a merchant in a distant land and has not returned to Gulabad since leaving shortly after Ali's birth. Ali earns his living by selling timber he cuts from the hills.

Gulabad is terrorized by a band of 40 bandits who hide their loot in a magical cave located in the deserted hills. The bandit leader uses a magical spell to open the cave and another to close it.

When news reaches Ali that his father has gone missing, he sets out to find him. During his journey, Ali not only locates his father but also rescues Princess Marjeena from the guards of a usurper who murdered her father to seize the throne. Ali and Marjeena fall in love, but their happiness is short-lived. They are ambushed, Marjeena is captured, and Yousuf is killed.

After burying his father, Ali learns that Marjeena is being sold in the slave market. He borrows money from Qasim to buy her freedom and brings her home. However, Qasim demands repayment and decides to evict Ali and their mother when the debt is not returned. Forced to leave, Ali and his mother start anew.

Meanwhile, the Qazi of the region announces a reward for the capture of the notorious bandit Abu Hassan. Fatima, a young girl whose father was murdered by the dacoits, seeks vengeance and offers to help Ali defeat Abu Hassan.

Soon, Ali discovers Abu Hassan’s secret hideout and learns the magic spells to access it. He takes some gold and jewelry from the cave, which he distributes among the villagers to fund a water diversion project for their parched land.

Qasim, driven by greed, persuades Ali to reveal the cave's location and the spells. After gaining this knowledge, Qasim visits the cave but becomes trapped when he forgets the spell to reopen the door. When the dacoits find him, they kill him.

Ali informs the Qazi about Abu Hassan’s hideout, unaware that the Qazi and Abu Hassan are the same person. The Qazi instructs his men to kill Ali to protect the treasure. Abu Hassan devises a plan to hide the forty thieves in large urns, intending to ambush Ali. However, Ali discovers the plot with Fatima's help and kills all the thieves.

In the end, Ali exposes the truth about Abu Hassan’s dual identity and brings justice to Gulabad.

== Cast ==
- Dharmendra as Alibaba / Ali
- Hema Malini as Princess Marjeena
- Zeenat Aman as Fatima
- Yoqub Ahmedov as Qasim – Ali’s elder brother
- Sofiko Chiaureli as Ali's mother
- Rolan Bykov as Abu Hassan – Leader of the 40 thieves
- Elena Sanayeva as the Spirit of the cave
- Zakir Mukhamedzhanov as Yousuf – Ali’s father
- Kuatbai Abdreimov as Ali's friend
- Frunzik Mkrtchyan as Mustafa
- Khodzha Durdy Narliyev as Khamid
- Prem Chopra as Shamsher
- Madan Puri as Fatima's father
- Pinchoo Kapoor as King Shah Parvez
- Mac Mohan as Mehmood
- Sanat Divanov as Ali’s friend
- Kuatbai Abdreimov as Ali’s friend
- Sharif Kabilov as Bandit

== Music and soundtrack ==
The music for the film's songs was composed by R. D. Burman and the lyrics of the songs were penned by Anand Bakshi. The background score of the movie was done by Vladimir Milov.

No.	Title	Singer(s)	Length
1.	"Jadugar Jadu Kar Jayega, Kisiko Samajh Nahin Aayega"	Kishore Kumar, Asha Bhosle
2.	"Qayamat Qayamat"	Lata Mangeshkar
3.	"Sare Shahar Mein Ek Haseen Hai, Aur Woh Main Hoon"	Lata Mangeshkar, Asha Bhosle
4.	"Aaja Sar-E-Bazar"	Lata Mangeshkar
5.	"Khatouba Khatouba"	Asha Bhosle

== Box office ==
Ali Baba was a successful Indo-Soviet co-production, becoming a financial success in India and an even bigger hit in the Soviet Union. In India, it was the eighth top-grossing film of 1980, earning ₹30 million nett from a gross collection of ₹60 million ($7.63 million). It reached silver jubilee status after running in theaters across India for 25 weeks continuously.

In the Soviet Union, it was the fifth top-grossing domestic film of 1980, and the 32nd highest-grossing domestic film of all time, with 52.8 million box office admissions. This was equivalent to approximately 13.2 million Rbls ($20.5 million, ₹161.13 million). Worldwide, the film grossed $28.13 million (₹221.13 million). This is equivalent to $110 million (₹10.63 billion) adjusted for inflation in 2025.

In terms of footfalls, the film sold an estimated 21 million tickets in India and 52.8 million tickets in the Soviet Union, for an estimated total of 74 million tickets sold worldwide.

== Awards ==
The film won awards at several film festivals, including the All-Union Film Festival in 1980, the Dushanbe Film Festival in 1980, and the Grand Prix at the Belgrade Film Festival in 1981.

== See also ==
Other Indo-Soviet films:

- Sohni Mahiwal
- Ajooba
