= Ram Balram =

- Poster
- Directed by: Vijay Anand
- Written by: Vijay Anand
- Produced by: Tito
- Starring: Dharmendra; Amitabh Bachchan; Zeenat Aman; Rekha; Ajit; Amjad Khan; Prem Chopra; Helen
- Cinematography: Fali Mistry
- Edited by: Vijay Anand
- Music by: Laxmikant–Pyarelal
- Distributed by: Navjeevan Productions
- Release date: 28 November 1980
- Running time: 171 minutes
- Country: India
- Language: Hindi

Ram Balram is a 1980 Indian Hindi-language action thriller film directed by Vijay Anand. The film stars Dharmendra, Amitabh Bachchan, Zeenat Aman, Rekha, Helen, Ajit Khan, Amjad Khan and Prem Chopra.

== Plot ==
Ram and Balram are two young boys who live with their loving parents. Their scheming uncle, Jagatpal, however, kills the boys' parents. Jagatpal lies to the boys that their parents have been killed in an accident and promises to raise them himself.

He forces the older brother Ram to become a thief (Ram also works as a mechanic to conceal his thefts). He enrolls the younger brother Balram in school and eventually sends him off to join the police force. Jagatpal has a tight hold on the boys, even when Ram is an adult, he still gives all his wages to his uncle and is only allowed to keep a few rupees for pocket money.

When Balram returns as a fully fledged police officer, Jagatpal finally reveals his plan. He is going to use Ram to target the biggest smugglers in India. Now that Balram is a police officer, he will protect his brother from getting arrested. Ram and Balram have reservations, but Jagatpal threatens to beat them just as he did when they were boys; he has a needle at the edge of his cane and whenever the boys would do something Jagatpal dislikes, he would put the pointy and dangerous needle on the boys' neck.

To circumvent Jagatpal’s plan, Balram tells his superiors in the police force that his brother intends to infiltrate the smuggler's underworld so that Balram can arrest them. Thus, Ram becomes a police informer.

The plan goes well. Ram becomes one of the lieutenants of one of the biggest smugglers, Suleman. He robs both Suleman and another big smuggler Chaman. Balram's excellent arrest rate makes him one of the force's most successful officers. Still, Jagatpal becomes enormously wealthy from Ram's illicit gains.

The brothers also find love. Balram with Shobha, the daughter of a college professor and Ram with Madhu, a girl who has moved to the area with her mother looking for her father. Unbeknownst to Ram, the girl believes her father to be Jagatpal. Her courtesan mother Tara, attempts to extort money from Jagatpal but he refuses to believe that he is Madhu’s father. His suspicions are confirmed when he catches the mother paying off a former acquaintance. The man is confronted by Jagatpal and confesses that the girl is not Jagatpal's daughter.

Jagatpal's plan comes unstuck however when the boys' mother returns. She did not die after all. She reveals Jagatpal's actions to the two brothers and they unite to take him down.

== Cast ==
- Dharmendra as Ram aka Bholu Ram
- Amitabh Bachchan as Inspector Balram Singh
- Zeenat Aman as Madhu
- Rekha as Shobha
- Ajit as Jaggu / Chaudhary Jagatpal Singh
- Amjad Khan as Sulaiman
- Prem Chopra as Chandan Singh
- Helen as Tarabai
- Utpal Dutt as Professor (Shobha's Father)
- Asit Sen as Inspector Mukherjee
- Sujit Kumar as Daku Satarawala
- Urmila Bhatt as Saraswati Devi

== Soundtrack ==
Music composed by Laxmikant-Pyarelal. Lyrics penned by Anand Bakshi. Mohammed Rafi playbacked for Dharmendra, Kishore Kumar playbacked for Amitabh Bachchan, Lata Mangeshkar and Asha Bhosle sang for Zeenat Aman, and Asha Bhosle sang for Rekha.

Song	Singer
"Ek Rasta, Do Rahi, Ek Chor, Ek Sipahi"	Mohammed Rafi, Kishore Kumar
"Humse Bhool Ho Gayi, Humka Maafi Dai Do"	Kishore Kumar, Asha Bhosle
"Yaar Ki Khabar Mil Gayi, Pyar Ki Nazar Mil Gayi"	Kishore Kumar, Asha Bhosle
"Ladki Pasand Ki Mushkil Se Milti Hai, Mil Gayi, Mil Gayi"	Mohammed Rafi, Lata Mangeshkar
"Ab To Ram Hi Jaan Bachaye, Bera Paar Lagaye"	Mohammed Rafi, Asha Bhosle, Dilraj Kaur

== Box office ==
Lifetime collection of Ram Balram was ₹ 4.7 crore.
