= Teesri Ankh =

- Poster
- Directed by: Subodh Mukherji
- Produced by: Subir Mukherjee
- Starring: Dharmendra; Shatrughan Sinha; Rakesh Roshan; Zeenat Aman; Neetu Singh; Amjad Khan
- Music by: Laxmikant–Pyarelal
- Production company: Sasadhar Mukherjee Productions
- Release date: 23 April 1982
- Running time: 150 minutes
- Country: India
- Language: Hindi

Teesri Ankh (transl. The Third Eye) is a 1982 Hindi-language action thriller film directed by Subodh Mukherji and produced by Subir Mukherjee. It features an ensemble cast of Dharmendra, Shatrughan Sinha, Rakesh Roshan, Zeenat Aman, Neetu Singh, Sarika, Amjad Khan and Nirupa Roy. The film was delayed for 5 years.

== Plot ==
One day an honest common man Kailash Nath brings a newborn orphan baby in their house. Kailash and his wife Malti brings him up and give him a name, Ashok. Kailash confronts with a dreaded bandit, Jabbar Singh. Jabbar threatens to him but Kailash's friend, Inspector Om arrests Jabbar and he was sentenced to be hanged. Jabbar's son Sheru kills Kailash as a revenge. At death bed Kailash confesses to Malti that Ashok is his first wife's son. Although Malti promises to take care of Ashok as his own but she can not. She always blames Ashok for the family's misfortunes, thinking him as her step son. Only person who understands and cares for Ashok is his girlfriend Barkha. One of Malti's other two sons Amar is missing and another Anand fallen into bad company and imprisoned for criminal offences and her family become cursed. Without having any way Malti goes to Ashok for help. How Ashok unites the family and they fight and defeat the enemy together, forms the rest of the story.

== Cast ==
- Dharmendra as Ashok K Nath
- Shatrughan Sinha as Amar Nath / Sagar
- Rakesh Roshan as Anand K Nath
- Zeenat Aman as Barkha
- Neetu Singh as Nisha
- Sarika as Rekha
- Nirupa Roy as Malti K Nath
- Pradeep Kumar as I.G. Malhotra
- Mehmood as Hanuman Singh
- I. S. Johar as Mirchandani
- Jeevan as Paul
- Ranjeet as Ranjit
- Kader Khan as Baba (Sagar's guardian)
- Amjad Khan as Jabbar Singh/Sheru
- Om Shivpuri as Inspector Om
- Satyen Kappu as Kailash Nath
- Helen as Monica
- Viju Khote as Damodar
- Rakesh Bedi as Kaushik Tiwari
- Urmila Bhatt as Inspector Om's wife

== Soundtrack ==
No.	Title	Singer(s)	Length
1.	"Idd Ke Din Gale Mil Le Raja"	Mohammed Rafi, Manna Dey, Anuradha, Krishnan Mukherjee
2.	"Kya Jalwa Kya Nazara"	Mohammed Rafi
3.	"O Babu Humne To Pyar Kiya Hai"	Kishore Kumar, Lata Mangeshkar
4.	"Om Namah Shivaya"	M. Shankar
5.	"Salaam Salaam"	Mohameed Rafi
6.	"Superman"	Kishore Kumar, Asha Bhosle
