= Darling Darling (1977 film) =

- Directed by: Gogi Anand
- Starring: Dev Anand; Zeenat Aman
- Music by: R. D. Burman
- Release date: 1977
- Country: India
- Language: Hindi

Darling Darling is 1977 Hindi-language action comedy film directed by Gogi Anand and starring Dev Anand and Zeenat Aman in lead roles.

== Cast ==
- Dev Anand as Kumar
- Zeenat Aman as Madhu
- Mehmood as Debu
- Jeevan as Dr. Jeevan
- Helen as Club Dancer
- Sajjan as Rai Bahadur Dinanath
- Nadira as Mrs. Rai Bahadur
- Shakti Kapoor as Bablu
- Durga Khote as Kumar's Mother
- Poonam Sinha as Seema
- Shivraj as Advocate
- Dheeraj Kumar

== Soundtrack ==
The music of the film was composed by R. D. Burman, while lyrics were written by Anand Bakshi.

It has a popular song sung by Kishore Kumar, "Aise Na Mujhe Tum Dekho, Seene Se Laga Loonga". This song's shooting took place inside the fort at Mahabaleshwar, Maharashtra.

| Song | Singer |
|---|---|
| "Aise Na Mujhe Tum Dekho, Seene Se Laga Loonga" | Kishore Kumar |
| "Woh Aurat Hai, Yeh Hai Sharab, In Dono Mein Kahiye Janab" | Kishore Kumar |
| "Hello Darling, Hello Darling, Darling Darling" | Kishore Kumar, Asha Bhosle |
| "Raat Gayi Baat Gayi" | Kishore Kumar, Asha Bhosle |
| "Ek Main Hoon, Ek Tu, Aur Kya Chahiye" | Kishore Kumar, Asha Bhosle |
| "Yeh Duniya Kya Hai, Yeh Duniya Pagalkhana Hai" | Kishore Kumar, R. D. Burman |
| "Yeh Dum Halwai" | Kishore Kumar, Anuradha Paudwal |
