= Ishk Ishk Ishk =

- Lobby card
- Directed by: Dev Anand
- Produced by: Dev Anand; Amit Khanna
- Starring: Dev Anand; Zeenat Aman; Kabir Bedi; Shabana Azmi
- Cinematography: Fali Mistry
- Music by: R. D. Burman; Anand Bakshi (Lyrics)
- Release date: 8 November 1974
- Language: Hindi

Ishk Ishk Ishk (transl. Love, love, love) is a 1974 Hindi film produced, directed by and starring Dev Anand along with Zeenat Aman, Kabir Bedi, and Shabana Azmi. The film has some scenes of mountains in Nepal and Kalimpong. Dr.Graham's Homes school, which was called Kalimpong Public School, can be seen in the movie.

== Plot ==
The film begins with the beautiful scenes of Nepal. The child version of Dhun (Dev Anand)is a student of a music school run by (AK Hangal), where he makes a friend (Kabir Bedi). Dhun grows up to become a talented music teacher who his students love. Dhun is in love with Pammy (Shabana Azami), but she comes under the influence of her father and denies the love of Dhun. Dhun broken hearted leaves the school job and decides to go to the Math (a highest mountain in Nepal). He comes upon an Inn called Six Sisters Inn, run by Pahar (Premnath). He decides to stay there for a while. He meets the sisters, and falls in love with the one named Pooja (Zeenat Aman). In one of the incidents, Pooja slips from a cliff and Dhun saves her amidst an avalanche and snow storm. Pooja falls in love with Dhun, and both hope to marry soon. Pahar does raise objections, but they soon are overcome. Just when the marriage is being planned, the family come to know that both Pooja and Dhun are related, and the relationship is that Dhun is Pooja's maternal uncle. But the film ends with a surprising climax.

== Cast ==
- Dev Anand as Dhuun/Ravi Vyas
- Zeenat Aman as Pooja Pahar
- Shabana Azmi as Pammy
- Kabir Bedi as Diwana/Ravikant Vyas
- Shekhar Kapur
- Zarina Wahab as Prema
- Prem Nath as Pahar
- Trilok Kapoor as Col. S. K. Kumar
- Satyajeet as Gambhir
- Jeevan as Ghanshyam Dayal
- Iftekhar as Ghimire
- A. K. Hangal as Guruji
- Komilla Wirk as Jassi Pahar
- Nadira

== Crew ==
- Director – Dev Anand
- Producer – Dev Anand
- Executive Producer – Amit Khanna
- Cinematographer – Fali Mistry
- Audiography – Arun Sharma
- Music Director – R. D. Burman
- Lyricist – Anand Bakshi
- Playback Singers – Asha Bhosle, Kishore Kumar, Sushma Shrestha

== Music ==
All lyrics are written by Anand Bakshi; all music is composed by R. D. Burman.

No.	Title	Singer(s)	Length
1.	"Achhe Bachche Nahin Rote Hain"	Kishore Kumar	5:25
2.	"Bheegi Bheegi Ankhen"	Kishore Kumar, Asha Bhosle	4:10
3.	"Chal Saathi Chal"	Kishore Kumar	6:30
4.	"Ishq Ishq Ishq"	Kishore Kumar, Asha Bhosle	4:30
5.	"Kisi Na Kisi Se Hogi Mohabbat"	Asha Bhosle	5:00
6.	"Mujhko Agar Ijaazat Ho"	Kishore Kumar	4:40
7.	"Tim Tim Chamka Jhilmil Tara"	Kishore Kumar, Asha Bhosle	4:40
8.	"Vallah Kya Nazara Hai"	Kishore Kumar, Asha Bhosle, Sushma Shreshtha	7:10

== Notes ==
During the making of this movie, Dev Anand surveyed the location from a helicopter in Nepal. A perfectionist to the core, Dev Saab identified Shyangboche, with hardly any habitation and decided to have his shooting in the hilly areas of Nepal.

== Reception ==
Despite the famous tracks, which were composed by no other than R. D. Burman and the expensive budget for the film, the film was received as the "biggest disaster" for Dev Saab and his crew.
