= Takkar (1980 film) =

1980 Indian film by K. Bapayya

- Theateral release poster
- Directed by: K. Bapayya
- Written by: Chandandas Shokh (dialogues)
- Screenplay by: G. Hanumantha Rao
- Story by: G. Hanumantha Rao
- Based on: Devudu Chesina Manushulu (1973) by V. Ramachandra Rao
- Produced by: G. A. Seshagiri Rao; Krishna (Presents)
- Starring: Ashok Kumar; Sanjeev Kumar; Jeetendra; Vinod Mehra; Zeenat Aman; Jaya Prada; Bindiya Goswami
- Cinematography: P. L. Rai
- Edited by: K. Gopala Rao
- Music by: R. D. Burman
- Production company: Padmalaya Studios
- Release date: 18 April 1980
- Running time: 156 minutes
- Country: India
- Language: Hindi

Takkar (transl. Collision) is a 1980 Hindi-language action film directed by K. Bapayya. It features an ensemble cast of Ashok Kumar, Sanjeev Kumar, Jeetendra, Vinod Mehra, Zeenat Aman, Jaya Prada and Bindiya Goswami with music composed by R. D. Burman. It is produced by G. A. Seshagiri Rao under the Padmalaya Studios banner and presented by Krishna. The film is a remake of the 1973 Telugu movie Devudu Chesina Manushulu. The film is Padmalaya Studios' Bollywood debut and after this they made nearly 20 films.

== Cast ==
- Ashok Kumar as Zamindar
- Sanjeev Kumar as Kishan/Suraj
- Jeetendra as Vijay
- Vinod Mehra as Vinod/Boss (Double Role)
- Zeenat Aman as Sapna
- Jaya Prada as Ganga
- Bindiya Goswami as Meena
- Asha Sachdev as Meenakshi
- Prema Narayan as Achla
- Ranjeet as Ranjeet
- Sujit Kumar as Ranveer
- Asrani as Pritam
- Komila Virk as Roma
- Jeevan as Mamaji Bhagat
- Leela Chitnis as Gayatri
- Kamini Kaushal as Kaushalya
- Mukri as Kaushal
- Mac Mohan as Jagmohan
- Jalal Agha as Kishore
- Mohan Choti as Ramesh

== Soundtrack ==
Music: R. D. Burman, Lyrics: Anand Bakshi

Song	Singer
"Ritu Ru, Ritu Ru"	Kishore Kumar
"Jab Jab Dekhun Main Teri Taraf, Dil Dhak Se Dhadak Jata"	Kishore Kumar, Lata Mangeshkar
"Murti Ganesh Ki, Andar Daulat Desh Ki"	Kishore Kumar, Mahendra Kapoor
"Achha Bahana Hai"	Asha Bhosle
"Duniya Kya Hai"	Asha Bhosle
"Yeh Tanhaiyan"	Asha Bhosle
"Makhanchor Nandkishore Manmohan Ghanshyam Re"	Mohammed Rafi, Asha Bhosle
