= Manoranjan =

1974 film by Shammi Kapoor

- Original poster
- Directed by: Shammi Kapoor
- Written by: Abrar Alvi
- Produced by: F.C. Mehra
- Starring: Shammi Kapoor; Sanjeev Kumar; Zeenat Aman
- Cinematography: Dwarka Divecha
- Edited by: Pran Mehra
- Music by: Rahul Dev Burman
- Production companies: Mehboob Studios; Natraj Studios
- Distributed by: Eagle Films; United Producers
- Release date: 11 January 1974
- Country: India
- Language: Hindi

Manoranjan (transl. Entertainment) is a 1974 Indian Hindi-language romantic comedy film directed by Shammi Kapoor. It is a remake of Irma La Douce. Sanjeev Kumar plays Jack Lemmon's role, Zeenat Aman Shirley MacLaine's and Shammi Kapoor plays Lou Jacobi's. Hotel Casanova is called Hotel Mauj!. Among the rest of the cast are Paintal, Asit Sen and Dev Kumar.

== Cast ==
- Shammi Kapoor as Dhoop Chhaon
- Sanjeev Kumar as Constable Ratan 'Sheru'
- Zeenat Aman as Nisha
- Dev Kumar as Balram
- Faryal as Lolita
- Madan Puri as Police Inspector
- Paintal as Tingoo
- Asit Sen as Senior Constable
- Agha as Man with ice-cream
- Murad as Police Commissioner

== Plot ==
Havaldar Ratan is a rookie at the local police station and is assigned duty on foot patrol on Manoranjan Street, a notorious red-light area, on the very first day of his job. He strikes up a conversation with a good-looking young woman named Nisha and tells her that there is a possible violation of Suppression of Immoral Trafficking Act taking place on this street. He witnesses several women soliciting men, and decides to call in the paddy wagon, and get them arrested. Alas, one of the men frequenting the prostitutes is none other than Ratan's superior officer, who immediately summons Ratan, and has him removed from service on corruption charges. Nisha takes pity on a homeless and unemployed Ratan and asks him to live with her. He does not want her to sell her body, and so he decides to work at night, and during the day he takes on the guise of a rich Nawab and spends time with her. Things go along smoothly, until Ratan decides that it is now time to get rid of the "Nawab", and he does so, only to find out that the police have been informed that he has killed the Nawab, and they are out to arrest him. What follows is hilarious chaos that will change Ratan and Nisha's lives forever.

== Production ==
In a 2008 interview with the BBC, Shammi Kapoor revealed that he had planned to star in Irma La Douce since the early 1960s when he first saw it in a theatre in London. He originally wanted to play the role of Nestor Patau, the honest police officer. However, by the time the film was made Kapoor felt he was too old for the role, and Sanjeev Kumar was given the part. The films was shot at Mehboob Studios and Natraj Studios. Kapoor also directed a video magazine called "Shammi Kapoor Presents Manoranjan" to promote the film.

== Music ==
R.D. Burman composed the songs. Asha Bhosle earned a Filmfare Nomination as Best Female Playback Singer for the song "Chori Chori Sola Singar," the only nomination for the film.

1. "Aaya Hoon Main Tujhko Le Jaoonga" - Part 1 (Kishore Kumar, Asha Bhosle)
2. "Goyake Chunanche Kiya Maine Pyar" (Kishore Kumar, Lata Mangeshkar, Manna Dey)
3. "Dulhan Maike Chali" (Asha Bhosle, Lata Mangeshkar, Usha Mangeshkar)
4. "Chori Chori Sola Singar" (Asha Bhosle)
