= Ajanabee (1974 film) =

1974 film

- Poster
- Directed by: Shakti Samanta
- Written by: Akhtar Romani (Dialogues)
- Screenplay by: Gulshan Nanda
- Story by: Gulshan Nanda
- Produced by: Girija Samanta
- Starring: Rajesh Khanna; Zeenat Aman; Prem Chopra; Asrani; Yogeeta Bali
- Cinematography: Aloke Das Gupta
- Edited by: Bijoy Chowdhary
- Music by: Rahul Dev Burman
- Production company: Natraj Studios
- Distributed by: Samanta Enterprises; United Producers; EVP International
- Release date: 18 September 1974 (India)
- Running time: 141 mins
- Country: India
- Language: Hindi
- Box office: ₹28 million

Ajanabee (English: Stranger) is a 1974 Indian Hindi-language film produced by Girija Samanta and directed by Shakti Samanta. The film stars Rajesh Khanna and Zeenat Aman in the lead supported by Prem Chopra, Asrani, Madan Puri, Yogeeta Bali and Asit Sen. The film's music is by R.D. Burman. The song Hum Dono Do Premi is a four-minute train sequence in the film and it was the first song to be shot fully on the top of the train. This film saw Khanna paired for the first time with Aman.

== Plot ==
One monsoon night, a terrified young woman, Sonia (Yogeeta Bali), gets down from a Taxi and runs towards the Railway station in Deenapur asking for a ticket to Bombay. However, she is not able to catch the said train on time as the station master Rohit Saxena (Rajesh Khanna) takes time to give her the railway ticket to Bombay. She does not have any place to go and decides to wait at the station for the next train, the following morning. She is carrying an attache case containing jewellery worth lakhs. She deposits it to Rohit, which he safely locks in his safe.

Since Rohit feels it is not safe for her to wait at the platform he offers to drop her at his quarters, near by and she readily agrees to it.

It is obvious that she is fleeing from someone and Rohit feels she must have stolen the jewellery but she denies the accusation. She tells him that she inherited them from her mother but there are goons behind her because of it. And she is escaping from them. He buys the story and assured that she is safe and comfortable there, he goes back to the station.

Sitting on his chair in his office, he goes back in time and lives in flashback for a while thinking about how he first came across Rashmi (Zeenat Aman).

He is riding a motorcycle on his way to his uncle's (Asit Sen) house for his cousin's wedding. On the road he sees a car ahead of him and they have a race. After a while, Rashmi's car runs out of petrol. Attempting to help her and also not wanting to lose an opportunity of spending some time with a lovely dame, he empties all the petrol from his motorcycle into Rahmi's car and decides to travel along in her car. But before he can get in, she drives off. With no petrol, he gets stuck and finally manages to get a lift in a lorry. They meet a couple of times during his stay there and they fall in love.

Her father, Diwan Sardarilal (Hari Shivdasani), is looking for an assistant for Moti Babu (Prem Chopra), her brother-in-law, who has been looking after the business now. And Diwan feels Moti Babu is over-burdened with work and responsibilities. Rashmi presents Rohit to Diwan and he agrees to hire him. Rashmi has a hunch that Moti Babu is not as honest as he appears to be and tells Rohit about it. Rohit immediately begins auditing the records and discovers that the entries are not correct and a huge sum of money has been missing.

Moti Babu, scared that the truth will come out, plots against Rohit. Since Rashmi is so fond of him, the best way to get Rohit out of his way would be to somehow make her dislike him. As a part of the plan, they have a celebration with much Bhaang followed by a dance "Satra baras ki". And with the help of Bahadur and Bijli he manages to prove that Rohit tried to rape Bijli and has cheated on Rashmi. As per Panchayat's decision, a punishment, he is thrashed in front of the villagers and asked to leave the place immediately.

Moti Babu is celebrating his victory with Bahadur and Bijli. Rashmi happens to witness this and is disgusted. Much against wishes of Diwan and Moti Babu, she leaves the house and runs away with Rohit singing "Hum dono do premee". They go to Bombay and get married in a temple.

Two men show up at his office and they wake him up from his reverie. They introduce themselves as Inspector Tiwari and Inspector Sinha and enquire about a girl with an attache – Sonia. They tell him that she has stolen some valuables and has run away, and they are investigating the case. Though suspicious, Rohit does not reveal her whereabouts. He goes to his quarters and confronts her. But she tells him she has not stolen anything and gives him her mother's letter. After reading it he is convinced that she is innocent.

He comes back to his office. It is raining very heavily outside. Standing by the window he stares out and gets into a flashback mode again. This time the newly wed Rashmi and Rohit are singing "Bheegi bheegi raaton mein" in the rain.

Brought up the way she was, Rashmi does not know much of household work. She has a tough time trying to learn how to cook. They get acquainted with Chetan Kumar (Asrani), who lives in the floor below and become friends with him. He also helps her develop her culinary skills.

Rohit works for Bombay Publicity, an Ad Agency and Rashmi, on the other hand gets bored sitting at home the whole day with nothing to do. Since she has a good knowledge of colours she starts painting (inspired by Chetan) and wants to gift the painting to Rohit on his birthday. One fine day Chetan suggests her to start modelling. Having seen how his boss, M.M. Puri (Madan Puri) deals with models, Rohit is not happy about how the modelling world works.

But Rashmi, with a wealthy background is not used to live the way she is living and does not like compromising for every little thing. And she remains adamant about her decision until Rohit gives in. Indifference creeps in but Rohit is understanding and does all he can to keep Rashmi happy, though his ego keeps coming in between (sounds contradicting?). In no time she becomes a top model and even goes on to win a beauty pageant. She becomes thrilled with the idea that now within a short span of time, name and fame would knock her doors.

Soon after this, she realises she is expecting. She wants to pursue her career and thinks it is not the right time to start a family and even thinks of going for an abortion. But Rohit wants the child. So she decides to keep it. One day Rohit calls and when she goes down to Chetan's flat to answer the call, she slips and falls down the staircase. This results in a miscarriage. But Rohit feels she got an abortion done and gets mad at her, this is due to an incident at his office. They have a row and he walks out of the house. Having realised that he over-reacted, he comes back home in the evening and apologises but only after a while he finds out that Rashmi has left the house and gone.

He later on learns from Chetan that she had fallen down and had a miscarriage. He calls her but she does not speak to him. He resigns from Bombay Publicity and he sets out to bring her back. He goes to Diwan's house but learns that they have left the place and gone on a vacation. No one knows when they'll come back. Devastated, he goes to his uncle's house. There's a letter for him there, a legal notice asking for a divorce. Not knowing what to do next, he seeks employment and with the help of Mr. Saxena (Mama's friend), he gets the post of a Station Master at a remote hill station, Deenapur.

Back to present...he is at work and Mr. Saxena comes to meet him. He is surprised to see Mr. Saxena at such a remote place. To this, Mr. Saxena says he had come hunting with Diwan Sardarilal, who has put up at a place named Karimganj, nearby. He leaves for Karimganj to meet Rashmi. Rashmi seeing him does not seem to be happy. Rohit on the other hand tries wooing her back and further requests her to join his new residence that he got as a railway employee. Meanwhile, Rashmi's father enters the scene and instructs Rashmi to get away from there. He and Moti Babu tries every possible way to humiliate Rohit due to his low socio-economic condition. Rohit further remaining confident vows before Moti Babu to bring in money in order to get Rashmi back.

Back at present, Rohit realises he needs to arrange in money in order to bring back his estranged wife back. However, he is devastated to realise that he has no such money on his own but only the jewellery worth 5 lakhs in his office's locker belonging to the young lady who took refuge in his quarter. He further decides to open the locker and steal away the attache by strangling the lady to death. However, he comes back to his actual senses and realises he was about to commit a heinous crime under the pretext of bringing his wife back.

Meanwhile, fate decided to play another ruthless game on Rohit. The very next moment he finds himself arrested for the real murder of the lady which he, in actuality, never committed. But Rashmi says in court that she saw the real murderer Sinha and Tiwary. Rohit is proven innocent and reunited with Rashmi

== Cast ==
- Rajesh Khanna as Rohit Kumar Saxena
- Zeenat Aman as Rashmi Saxena
- Yogeeta Bali as Sonia
- Prem Chopra as Moti Babu
- Madan Puri as Mr. M.M. Puri
- Asrani as Chetan Kumar
- Hari Shivdasani as Diwan Sardarilal
- Raj Mehra as Advocate Bakshi
- Manmohan as Sinha
- Mauji Singh as the Sikh truck driver
- Ratan Gaurang as station attendant
- Chandrashekhar Vaidya as Badal
- Asit Sen as Lalit babu (Mamaji)
- Leena Das as Bijli
- Krishnakant as Prosecutor
- Moolchand as Kaka
- Uma Dutt as Judge
- Arpana Choudhary as Ruhi
- Jankidas as Chowdhary Chacha
- Radheshyam as Abdul Chacha
- Kundan Malik as Tiwari

== Music ==
The score and soundtrack for film was composed by R. D. Burman and lyrics were written by Anand Bakshi.

Songs
| No. | Title | Playback | Length |
|---|---|---|---|
| 1. | "Bheegi Bheegi Raaton Mein" | Kishore Kumar, Lata Mangeshkar |
| 2. | "Ek Ajnabee Haseena Se" | Kishore Kumar, Rajesh Khanna |
| 3. | "Hum Dono Do Premi" | Kishore Kumar, Lata Mangeshkar |
| 4. | "Satrah Baras Ki Chhokariyan" | Kishore Kumar, Asha Bhosle |

== Reception ==
=== Box office ===
The film fetched 28 million in India throughout its run, and was a platinum jubilee hit at the box office.
