= Zeenat Aman =

Indian actress and model (born 1951)

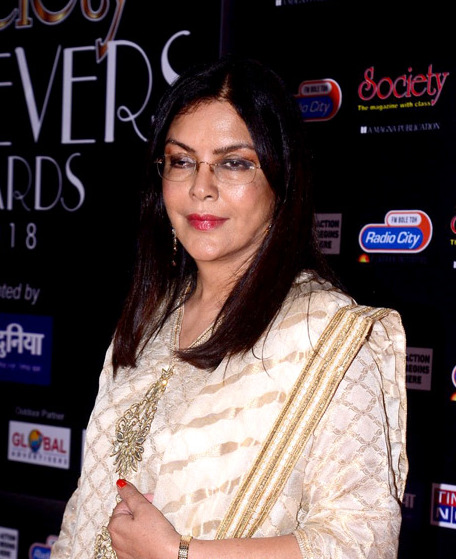
- Aman in 2018
- Born: Zeenat Khan; 19 November 1951 (age 74); Bombay, Bombay State, India
- Occupations: Actress; model
- Years active: 1970–present
- Works: Full list
- Spouses: Sanjay Khan (m. 1978; ann. 1979); Mazhar Khan (m. 1985; died 1998)
- Children: 2
- Relatives: See Murad–Rai-Aman family
- Beauty pageant titleholder
- Title: Femina Miss India Asia Pacific 1970; Miss Asia Pacific 1970

Zeenat Aman (born 19 November 1951) is an Indian actress and model who mainly works in Hindi films. One of the greatest actresses of Hindi cinema, she established herself as one of the highest-paid and most glamorous actresses of her time and is cited in the media as a fashion icon and sex symbol. Aman played a significant role in redefining the portrayal of women in Indian cinema through leading characters who embodied modernity, individuality and self-assurance along with a Western-influenced sense of style.

Aman first received recognition after winning the Femina Miss India pageant and the Miss Asia Pacific International pageant in 1970. Aman began acting that same year, appearing in the films The Evil Within (1970), Hungama (1971) and Hulchul (1971). Her breakthrough came with Dev Anand's drama film Haré Rama Haré Krishna (1971), which won her the Bengal Film Journalists' Association Award for Best Actress and the Filmfare Award for Best Supporting Actress. She continued to rise to prominence in the 1970s, playing leading roles in films such as Yaadon Ki Baaraat (1973), Roti Kapada Aur Makaan (1974), Ajanabee (1974), Warrant (1975), Chori Mera Kaam (1975), Dharam Veer (1977), Chhailla Babu (1977), Hum Kisise Kum Naheen (1977), and The Great Gambler (1979). She also starred as Roma in the action film Don (1978), and was nominated for the Filmfare Award for Best Actress for the controversial film Satyam Shivam Sundaram (1978). Also in 1978, she married Sanjay Khan; after suffering a highly publicised domestic violence incident from Khan, the marriage was annulled in 1979.

In the early 1980s, Aman had leading roles in Abdullah (1980), Alibaba Aur 40 Chor (1980), Qurbani (1980), Dostana (1980), and Insaf Ka Tarazu (1980), the lattermost of which earned her a nomination for the Filmfare Award for Best Actress. She continued acting in films throughout the early 1980s, with roles in the films Laawaris (1981), Teesri Aankh (1982), Mahaan (1983), Pukar (1983), and Jagir (1984). After her marriage to actor Mazhar Khan in 1985, she began acting less frequently in films. After appearing in the courtroom drama film Gawaahi (1989), she took a hiatus to focus on her marriage which lasted until Khan's death in 1998. In 1999, Aman returned with a minor role in the film Bhopal Express. After another brief hiatus, she appeared in the film Boom (2003). She has since had roles in several independent films, including Ugly Aur Pagli (2008), Dunno Y... Na Jaane Kyon (2010), Chaurahen (2012), Strings of Passion (2014), Dunno Y2... Life Is a Moment (2015), Dil Toh Deewana Hai (2016), and Sallu Ki Shaadi (2017), and the war film Panipat (2019) where she had a cameo appearance.

== Early life ==
Zeenat Aman was born as Zeenat Khan in Bombay on 19 November 1951, to a Pathan Muslim father, Amanullah Khan, and a Maharashtrian Hindu mother, Scinda(Vardhini) Heinz. (Note: German last name from the later step-father of Zeenat) Aman is the cousin of actor Raza Murad and the niece of actor Murad. Amanullah Khan was a screenwriter for movies such as Mughal-e-Azam (1960) and Pakeezah (1972), often writing under the nom de plume "Aman", which she later adopted as her screen name. Zeenat had lost her father at a young age while still in her school years. Amanullah's mother Akhtar Jahan Begum was a first cousin to Hamidullah Khan, the last Nawab of Bhopal.

Aman's parents divorced when she was young. When she was 13, her father died. She completed her schooling at a boarding school named St. Joseph's Convent School in Panchgani and attended University of Southern California in Los Angeles on student aid, but could not complete her graduation.

== Career ==
=== 1970s ===
In 1970, she participated in the Femina Miss India pageant, where she came in second place and was titled the 'First Princess'. Following this, she competed in, and won, the Miss Asia Pacific International pageant, becoming the person to hold both pageant titles at the same time. After winning these pageants Aman began acting, appearing first in the film The Evil Within (1970) alongside Dev Anand, which was commercially unsuccessful. In 1971, Aman appeared in a minor role in O. P. Ralhan's Hulchul, and in the same year appeared in the film Hungama, which starred Vinod Khanna, Kishore Kumar, Mehmood and Helen; both films were flops at the box office. Actor and director Dev Anand soon approached Aman to star as Jasbir/Janice in his 1971 musical drama Haré Rama Haré Krishna, after actress Zaheeda turned down the role. The film was a critical and commercial success, and proved to be a breakthrough for Aman. She won the Filmfare Award for Best Supporting Actress and the Bengal Film Journalists' Association Award for Best Actress (Hindi) for her performance in the film.

In the 1970s, Cine Blitz magazine was launched, with Aman on the cover of its first issue. In 1973, she starred in Heera Panna, yet again appearing alongside Anand, and in Nasir Hussain's Yaadon Ki Baaraat as Sunita, the love interest of Vijay Arora. The latter film was described by film scholar Kaushik Baumik as "the first quintessential Bollywood film", proved to be a major commercial success at the box office. Aman's performance in the song "Chura Liya Hai Tumne Jo Dil Ko" garnered considerable attention, after which she became known as the "girl in white carrying a guitar". She also starred in Dhund (1973) alongside Sanjay Khan and Danny Denzongpa; its plot was inspired by the Agatha Christie novel The Unexpected Guest. The cast's performance was praised, and the film was a moderate commercial success.

In 1974, Aman starred in Manoj Kumar's action drama Roti Kapda Aur Makaan, where she portrayed Sheetal, an opportunist who deserts her jobless lover for a millionaire. Aman had continued to star alongside Dev Anand throughout the year, appearing together in Prem Shastra and Ishq Ishq Ishq. She played Nisha, a recovering prostitute, in the Shammi Kapoor-directed film Manoranjan, and starred in Ajanabee as Rashmi, an ambitious girl who runs away to marry her lover but then faces a difficult choice; the latter film had an average box office performance. In 1975, Aman appeared in two films: she portrayed an assassin Warrant, and played 'Sharmeeli' in Chori Mera Kaam; both films were successful.

Aman appeared in Deewaangee alongside Shashi Kapoor, and had an uncredited voice role in Balika Badhu. In 1977, she starred as a princess in Dharam Veer alongside Dharmendra, Jeetendra, and Neetu Singh. This was the second highest-grossing Hindi film of that year. She had roles in the films Darling Darling (again alongside Dev Anand) and Chhailla Babu, which was a commercial success. Aman next appeared in Hum Kisise Kum Naheen as Sunita, the lover of Rishi Kapoor, which was the third highest-grossing Hindi film of the year. Aman next attempted to enter Hollywood with Krishna Shah's film Shalimar, but it proved unsuccessful in both the United States and India. She next acted in Heeralaal Pannalal with Shashi Kapoor, Randhir Kapoor and Neetu Singh, then starred in Chor Ke Ghar Chor opposite Ashok Kumar and Randhir Kapoor .

Aman next starred in Raj Kapoor's romantic drama Satyam Shivam Sundaram (1978), which she influenced Kapoor to let her audition for, as she described to Cinestaan: "When I knocked on the door and he [Kapoor] asked who it was, I replied, 'Your future heroine'. I think he was touched by my dedication and determination to act in his film". The film was a box office success, but it initially drew criticism from critics, with many describing the plot as counter-intuitive; the subject dealt with the "soul being more attractive than the body" despite Kapoor's showcase of Aman's sex appeal. Aman's performance in the film garnered high praise and she received her first nomination for the Filmfare Award for Best Actress. Also in 1978, Aman originated the role of Roma in the film Don. The producer of the film, Nariman Irani, had been losing money at the time, which led the actress to take the role to help him and refusing payment for her work. Irani died midway through filming. The film released to significant commercial success, while garnering positive reviews for Aman's performance. It inspired the Don franchise, where Aman's character has been portrayed by Priyanka Chopra.

In 1979, Aman starred as Shabnam in The Great Gambler. She described her experience working on the film as one of her favourites, particularly when they filmed in Italy. When released, it became a sleeper hit. Her final role that year was a guest appearance in the film Gol Maal.

=== 1980s ===
In 1980, Aman first had roles in the films Takkar as Sapna, and in Ram Balram as Madhu. She also starred as Radha alongside Vinod Khanna in Bombay 405 Miles. Aman next starred as Zainab in the Sanjay Khan directed film Abdullah, starring alongside Raj Kapoor, Danny Denzongpa and Khan himself. The film had one of the highest budgets spent on any film at the time. Despite underperforming in India, the film achieved success in the Soviet Union. Aman next starred as Fatima in the Indian-Soviet produced film Adventures of Ali-Baba and the Forty Thieves, better known as Alibaba Aur 40 Chor, which is one of three film adaptations of the original folk tale, and was also noted for being one of the first movies to cast actors of other nationalities. It was a moderate success, and was one of the more successful Indian-Soviet co-productions.

Aman next starred in the Feroz Khan-directed film Qurbani alongside Khan and Vinod Khanna; she was cast as Sheela, a singer and dancer. The film was a major success at the box-office, and the soundtrack received particular praise. The song "Aap Jaisa Koi", which had been sung by Nazia Hassan and picturised on Aman, received high praise. Aman also starred as Sheetal in the film Dostana alongside Amitabh Bachchan. She was next cast as a rape victim seeking justice in B. R. Chopra's Insaf Ka Tarazu, which was one of few films at the time to focus on its storyline rather than its soundtrack. The film earned Aman critical acclaim and her second nomination for the Filmfare Award for Best Actress. In 1981, Aman appeared in four films: first starrimg as Sonia, the love interest to Dharmendra, in Professor Pyarelal, followed by starring as Jamila Katilon Ke Kaatil, then appeared as Neera in Krodhi and a leading role alongside Amitabh Bachchan in Laawaris.

In 1982, Aman starred in the crime film Ashanti. In 1983, she starred in Mahaan as Rita, which was the first film to feature a triple-role character. The film turned to be an above-average grosser. In the same year, she starred as Julie in Pukar, which had an average performance at the box office. Her final role of that year was as Nisha Thakur in Hum Se Hai Zamana. In 1984, she starred in Jagir as the main heroine Sima, alongside Dharmendra, Mithun Chakraborty and Pran.

From 1985 to 1989, she appeared less frequently in films to focus more on her marriage with Mazhar Khan; her films in this period were critically and financially unsuccessful. She starred in the film Gawahi, a courtroom drama, which would be her last film role before temporarily retiring from the film industry.

=== 2000s ===
After ten years of inactivity, Aman appeared in a cameo role in Bhopal Express. She didn't appear in another film until 2003, when she played Alice in Boom. The film drastically underperformed at the box office, creating financial problems for the film's crew, including the producer Ayesha Shroff.

In 2004, she appeared as Mrs. Robinson in the play The Graduate staged at St Andrew's Auditorium in Mumbai. She also made an appearance, along with actress Hema Malini, in the talk show Koffee with Karan hosted by Karan Johar. Aman then had roles in the films Maksham (2005), Jaana... Let's Fall in Love (2006) as Raju's mother, and in Chaurahen which was released in 2012, but had originally been filmed and shelved in 2007. In 2008, Aman guest starred in the romantic comedy Ugly Aur Pagli. The following year, she starred in the film Geeta in Paradise. In 2008, Aman received a Lifetime Achievement Award during the Zee Cine Awards, as a recognition of her contribution to Hindi Cinema. She also received an "Outstanding Contribution to Indian Cinema" award at the 2010 IIFA Awards held at Colombo, Sri Lanka.

=== 2010s ===
In 2010, Aman starred as Rebecca in Dunno Y... Na Jaane Kyon. Originally aired at film festivals nationwide, the film drew immense controversy and was panned by critics for its gay stereotypes. However, the film achieved success through film festivals and later achieved a limited theatrical release. In the film, Aman performed the songs Aap Jaisa Koi and Chura Liya Hai Tumne Jo. It later spawned the sequel Dunno Y2... Life Is a Moment, released in 2014, which Aman also starred in. In 2012, Aman was cast as Roma in the film Strings of Passion. Aman had roles in the films Dil Toh Deewana Hai (2016) and Sallu Ki Shaadi (2017). Sallu Ki Shaadi was made as a tribute to actor Salman Khan.

In 2017, Aman was cast in the short-lived web series Love Life & Screw Ups, in which she played the main role of Joanna, a spinster with a drastic love life and personal problems, who frequently mingles with younger people. The show was featured in international film festivals, including a film festival in Poland, being the first Indian web series to be shown at a festival there. While the series received generally mixed reviews, Aman's performance was praised by critics.

In June 2019, Aman joined the cast of the film Panipat, where she portrayed the minor role of Sakina Begum, a character described by director Ashutosh Gowariker as "a feisty character leading her province of Hoshiyarganj." It was released theatrically in December 2019, emerging as a box-office failure. In a September 2019 interview with Eastern Eye, Aman discussed her current activity in the film industry, saying that "There are no great age appropriate roles for ladies my age. They are very few and far between in Hindi cinema, so that's it, but I wouldn't say no if a really great role came along."

=== 2020s ===
In February 2020, it was announced that Aman was staging a comeback in theatre, appearing in a play on Kasturba Gandhi. In January 2021, it was announced that she would star in the upcoming murder-mystery film Margaon: The Closed File, her first leading role since the 1980s. In the film, which is a tribute to Agatha Christie, Aman portrayed the "head of an Anglo Indian family who is an independent woman, a mother as well as an entrepreneur."

== Legacy ==
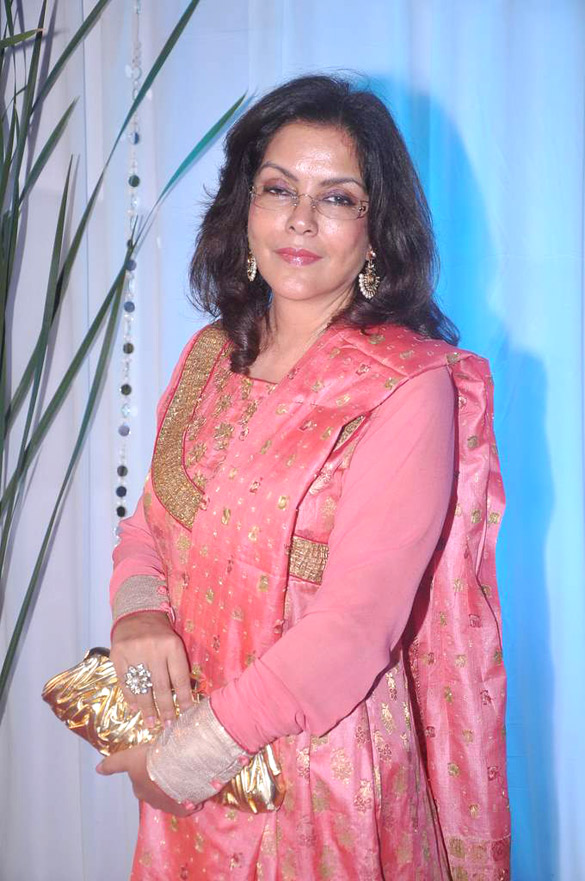
Aman in 2012

Aman is regarded as one of the greatest actresses of Hindi cinema. One of the highest paid actress of the 1970s and early 1980s, Aman appeared in Box Office India's "Top Actresses" list eight times (from 1974 to 1981). In 2022, she was placed in Outlook India's "75 Best Bollywood Actresses" list.

Aman initially met with controversy in her acting career for her sexualisation in a number of films, which some critics and fans believed overshadowed her performances. Commenting on this, she told Hindustan Times: "I don't regret or feel bad about anything that happened or may not have happened. If I lost something, I gained something more. The fact that I can look back at my career with so much pride and happiness means I have had a good run without any complaints." She has frequently been cited as the original sex symbol of Bollywood, and is known for her figure and looks. However, Aman has stated that she does not take the label seriously, and rather felt restricted by it.

In March 2016, an exhibition created by artist Mina Siddique was launched in Dubai which featured various works and arts dedicated to Aman. It was titled as Zeenat Aman, with the tagline "Redefining Beauty". The event was attended by Aman herself, as well as members from various countries, including UAE and Pakistan. In April 2019, Bollywood Hungama listed Aman as one of the "10 Hottest Bollywood Actresses Of All Time".

In 2019 Aman commented on dealing with media exposure, saying that "...I haven't got used to it and feel very blessed. Like I said to you, it is only now I have realised how blessed I am. I see people watching my films and songs as a blessing. There is a wonderful feeling of nostalgia when they see my films and songs. Whenever I am in their city, they reach out to me with that love and I feel very blessed and grateful for the same."

== Personal life ==
In 1978, Aman married actor Sanjay Khan, who was already married and a father of four children; this marriage was annulled in 1979, after Khan beat and physically assaulted her. After finishing the shooting of period romance Abdullah and while she was shooting for B. R. Chopra's legal thriller Insaf Ka Tarazu, she received a phone call from Khan, who wanted to discuss reshooting specific scenes for Abdullah, to which she told him that she was already committed to shooting Insaf Ka Tarazu, but hearing that Khan became angry and accused her of infidelity. Hearing those accusations, she took a leave from B. R. Chopra and came to meet him, at a hotel where he was partying in one of the suites. Upon seeing her, he became furious and took her to a room in the suite, where he beat her severely, resulting in many injuries, particularly to her right eye. This was witnessed by his wife, who allegedly joined him and cheered him on to keep beating Aman. The incident left Aman with a lazy eye (ptosis), and she later stated that she pretends it never happened.

Aman then married actor Mazhar Khan in 1985, and remained married until his death in 1998. With Mazhar, she has two sons: Azaan Khan, a film director who directed the heist film Bankster, and composer Zahaan Khan. The family lives in Mumbai. Of her marriage to Mazhar, Aman stated she was unhappy, revealing in 1999, on the show Rendezvous with Simi Garewal:

Mazhar never wanted me to grow as an individual or as an artist. He always wanted me to be with the kids and be at home. During the very first year of marriage I realised I had made a huge mistake, but I decided to live by it and make it work. I tried to make it work for another 12 years. There was no light at the end of the tunnel for me. There was not a single moment of happiness or joy during those 12 years. But I still tried making it work.

In February 2018, Aman filed a rape case against businessman Aman Khanna, better known as Sarfaraz. After stalking, harassing, and robbing Aman, as well as allegedly raping Aman various times, charges were pressed against Khanna which led to his incarceration. The incidents described were said to have taken place between 2011 and 2016.

== Accolades ==
Award	Year	Category	Work	Result	Ref.
Bengal Film Journalists' Association Awards	1973	Best Actress (Hindi)	Haré Rama Haré Krishna	Won	
Filmfare Awards	1972	Best Supporting Actress	Haré Rama Haré Krishna	Won	
Filmfare Awards	1979	Best Actress	Satyam Shivam Sundaram	Nominated	
Filmfare Awards	1981	Best Actress	Insaf Ka Tarazu	Nominated	
Filmfare Awards	2025	Lifetime Achievement Award	For outstanding contribution to Hindi cinema	Honored	

Honours

- 2003 – Bollywood Awards "Award for Lifetime Achievement" – Lifetime of Glamour.
- 2006 – "Outstanding Contribution to the Motion Picture Industry of India Awards" at the Bollywood Movie Awards.
- 2008 – Zee Cine Award for Lifetime Achievement.
- 2010 – "Outstanding Contribution to Indian cinema" at the 11th IIFA Awards.
- 2016 – "Timeless Glamour & Style Icon" at the Filmfare Glamour & Style Awards.
- 2025 - Filmfare Lifetime Achievement Award.
- 2026 - News18 India Amrit Ratna Samman.

== See also ==
- List of Indian film actresses

Awards and achievements
Preceded by (South Korea) Seo Won-kyoung	Miss Asia Pacific International; 1971	Succeeded by (Guam) Flora Baza

Awards and achievements
Preceded by Seo Won-kyoung	Miss Asia Pacific 1970; 1970	Succeeded by Flora Baza
Preceded by Tasneem Fakir Mohammed	Femina Miss India; 1970	Succeeded by Urmila Sanandan
