= List of Hindi films of 1986 =

Hindi Films
- Previous: List of Hindi films of 1985; Next: List of Hindi films of 1987

This is a list of films produced by the Bollywood film industry based in Mumbai.

== Highest-grossing films ==
The highest-grossing films at the Indian box office in 1986 were:

Rank	Title	Gross collection
1	Karma	₹14 crore
2	Nagina	₹9.5 crore
3	Aakhree Raasta	₹8.5 crore

== Films A-D ==
Title	Director	Cast	Genre	Sources
Aadamkhor	Joginder	Joginder Shelly, Neelam Mehra, Nazneen	Horror	
Aag Aur Shola	K. Bapaiah	Shoma Anand, Asrani, Bindu	Action, romance	
Aakhree Raasta	K. Bhagyaraj	Amitabh Bachchan, Sridevi, Jaya Prada, Sadashiv Amrapurkar, Anupam Kher	Crime drama	
Aap Ke Saath	J. Om Prakash	Smita Patil, Anil Kapoor, Rati Agnihotri	Drama, family	
Aashiana	Mahesh Bhatt	Mark Zubair, Deepti Naval, Soni Razdan		
Adhikar	Chitrayug, Vijay Sadanah	Rajesh Khanna, Tina Munim, Zarina Wahab	Drama	
Aisa Pyaar Kahan	Vijay Sadanah	Jeetendra, Jaya Prada, Mithun Chakraborty	Drama	
Allah Rakha	Ketan M. Desai	Jackie Shroff, Shammi Kapoor, Waheeda Rehman, Dimple Kapadia, Meenakshi Seshadri	Action	
Amma	Jiten	Mithun Chakraborty, Raakhee, Ashok Kumar, Neeta Mehta	Drama	
Amrit	Mohan Kumar	Rajesh Khanna, Smita Patil, Aruna Irani	Drama, family	
Anaadi Anant	Prakash Jha	Surekha Sikri, Vasant Jasaljar, Suman Kumar		
Andheri Raat Mein Diya Tere Haath Mein	Dada Kondke	Dada Kondke, Usha Chavan, Dina Pathak		
Angaaray	Rajesh Seth	Rajesh Khanna, Smita Patil, Raj Babbar	Adventure, crime, romance	
Ankush	N. Chandra	Nana Patekar, Rabia Amin, Raja Bundela	Drama	
Anokha Insaan	M. F. Kashyap	T. P. Jain, Padma Khanna, Sonika Gill		
Anokha Rishta	I. V. Sasi	Rajesh Khanna, Smita Patil, Sabeeha	Drama	
Anubhav	Kashinath	Shekhar Suman, Padmini Kolhapure, Padma Khanna	Comedy, drama	
Asli Naqli	Sudershan Nag	Shatrughan Sinha, Rajinikanth, Anita Raj	Drama	
Aurat	B. R. Ishara	Zeenat Aman, Shakti Kapoor, Shashi Kapoor		
Avinash	Umesh Mehra	Mithun Chakraborty, Poonam Dhillon, Bindiya Goswami	Action, crime, drama	
Baat Ban Jaye	Bharat Rangachary	Zeenat Aman, Amol Palekar, Utpal Dutt	Drama	
Babul	Govind Moonis	Aakash, Brahmachari, Shreechand Makhija	Drama	
Badkaar	Shiv Kumar	Sanjeev Kumar, Apeksha, Sadhana Singh		
Begaana	Ambrish Sangal	Kumar Gaurav, Dharmendra, Rati Agnihotri	Drama	
Bhagwaan Dada	J. Om Prakash	Rajinikanth, Rakesh Roshan, Sridevi	Action	
Bhai Ka Dushman Bhai	Sudesh Issar	Puneet Issar, Suresh Oberoi, Talluri Rameshwari		
Car Thief	Sameer Malkan	Suneil Anand, Vijayata Pandit, Kevin Mukherji		
Chambal Ka Badshah	S. Dinesh	Danny Denzongpa, Roma Manik, Raj Kiran		
Chameli Ki Shaadi	Basu Chatterjee	Anil Kapoor, Amrita Singh, Om Prakash	Comedy, drama, romance	
Congregation	Muzaffar Ali	Shabana Azmi, Farooq Sheikh, Rohini Hattangadi	Drama	
Dahleez	Ravi Chopra	Jackie Shroff, Raj Babbar, Meenakshi Seshadri	Drama, family, action	
Daku Bijlee				
Dancing City			Romance	
Dharm Adhikari	K. Raghavendra Rao	Dilip Kumar, Jeetendra, Sridevi, Pran	Action	
Dilwaala	K. Murali Mohana Rao	Smita Patil, Mithun Chakraborty, Meenakshi Seshadri, Shakti Kapoor, Dulari, Pran	Action	
Dosti Dushmani	T. Rama Rao	Jeetendra, Rishi Kapoor, Rajnikanth, Kimi Katkar, Bhanupriya, Poonam Dhillon, Pran	Dosti	
Durgaa Maa	K.S. Reddy	Beena Banerjee, Shubha Khote, Raj Kiran		
Duty	Ravikant Nagaich	Arun Bakshi, Rakesh Bedi, Govinda		

== Films E-P ==
Title	Director	Cast	Genre	Sources
Ek Aur Sikander	Bhaskar Shetty	Rati Agnihotri, Mithun Chakraborty, Amrish Puri	Action	
Ek Chadar Maili Si	Sukhwant Dhadda	Hema Malini, Rishi Kapoor, Poonam Dhillon	Drama	
Ek Main Aur Ek Tu	Ravi Tandon	Shashi Kapoor, Rubina, Tanuja	Romance	
Ek Misaal	Rajesh Verma	Kanwaljit Singh, Kiran Juneja		
Ek Pal	Kalpana Lajmi	Shabana Azmi, Naseeruddin Shah, Farooq Sheikh	Drama	
Ek Ruka Hua Faisla	Basu Chatterjee	S. M. Zaheer, Deepak Kejriwal, Amitabh Srivastava, Pankaj Kapur, Annu Kapoor	Thriller	
Genesis	Mrinal Sen	Shabana Azmi, Naseeruddin Shah, Om Puri	Drama	
Ghar Sansar	K. Bapaiah	Jeetendra, Sridevi, Kader Khan	Family, crime, drama	
Haathon Ki Lakeeren	Chetan Anand	Sanjeev Kumar, Zeenat Aman, Jackie Shroff	Musical, drama, family	
Ilzaam	Shibu Mitra	Govinda, Neelam Kothari, Shashi Kapoor, Shatrughan Sinha, Prem Chopra, Anita Raj, Raj Kiran	Romance, drama	
Insaaf Ki Awaaz	D. Rama Naidu	Rekha, Anil Kapoor, Richa Sharma	Action	
Inteqam Ki Aag		Kajal Kiran, Mahendra Sandhu		
Jaal	Umesh Mehra	Rekha, Mithun Chakraborty, Mandakini, Moon Moon Sen	Mystery, thriller	
Janbaaz	Feroz Khan	Feroz Khan, Anil Kapoor, Dimple Kapadia, Sridevi, Rekha, Amrish Puri	Action, drama	
Jeeva	Raj N. Sippy	Sanjay Dutt, Mandakini, Amjad Khan, Pran	Action, thriller	
Jumbish: A Movement - The Movie	Salahuddin Parvez	Padmini Kolhapure, Akbar Khan, Shafi Inamdar	Romance	
Jwala	Sudesh Issar	Puneet Issar, Goga Kapoor, Kamal Kapoor		
Kaanch Ki Deewar	M. N. Yasin	Sanjeev Kumar, Smita Patil, Shakti Kapoor	Drama	
Kala Dhanda Goray Log	Sanjay Khan	Sunil Dutt, Sanjay Khan, Akbar Khan, Anita Raj, Amrita Singh	Action, drama	
Karamdaata	Shashilal Nair	Shammi Kapoor, Mithun Chakraborty, Amrita Singh		
Karma	Subhash Ghai	Dilip Kumar, Nutan, Naseeruddin Shah, Jackie Shroff, Anil Kapoor, Sridevi, Poonam Dhillon, Shakti Kapoor, Dara Singh, Anupam Kher	Action, drama	
Khamosh Nigahen	Ajay Sharma	Rakesh Roshan, Deepti Naval		
Khel Mohabbat Ka	Satish Duggal	Farooq Sheikh, Poonam Dhillon, Shakti Kapoor	Romance	
Kirayadar	Basu Chatterji	Raj Babbar, Padmini Kolhapure, Utpal Dutt	Comedy, drama	
Kismetwala	S. D. Narang	Mithun Chakraborty, Ranjeeta Kaur, Asha Parekh	Action	
Krishna-Krishna	Chandrakant	Birbal, Biswajeet, Sudhir Dalvi	Mythological	
The Living Corpse	Manmohan Sabir	Aakash, Birbal, Mohan Choti		
Locket	Ramesh Ahuja	Jeetendra, Rekha, Vinod Mehra, Nirupa Roy, Kader Khan	Drama	
Love 86	Esmayeel Shroff	Govinda, Rohan Kapoor, Farah, Neelam Kothari, Tanuja, Asrani, Shafi Inamdar	Romance, drama	
Love and God	K. Asif	Nimmi, Sanjeev Kumar, Jayant, Agha, Pran	Drama	
Maa Ki Saugandh	Mukul Anand			
Maati Balidan Ki	Shiv Kumar	Sandhu Raj, Anu Dhawan, Rama Vij		
Main Balwaan	Mukul Anand	Dharmendra, Mithun Chakraborty, Meenakshi Seshadri, Rita Bhaduri	Crime, action	
Manav Hatya	Sudarshan K. Rattan	Shekhar Suman, Madhuri Dixit, Gulshan Grover	Action	
Mangal Dada		Sunil Dutt, Reena Roy, Sarika		
Mazloom	C. P. Dixit	Bina Rai, Feroz Khan, Goga Kapoor	Action, crime, drama	
Mera Dharam	Bapu	Jackie Shroff, Amrita Singh, Shakti Kapoor		
Mera Haque	Ajay Kashyap	Sanjay Dutt, Anita Raj, Gulshan Grover	Action	
Mere Saath Chal		Smita Patil, Farooq Sheikh	Drama	
Mohabbat Ki Kasam	K. Pappu	Rajesh Khanna, Dharmendra, Anita Raj, Tanuja	Action, drama	
Muddat	K. Bapaiah	Mithun Chakraborty, Jaya Prada, Padmini Kolhapure	Action, crime, drama, comedy	
Musafir	Jabbar Patel	Rekha, Naseeruddin Shah, Moon Moon Sen	Drama	
Naache Mayuri	T. Rama Rao	Shekhar Suman, Sudha Chandran, Aruna Irani	Drama, family	
Naam	Mahesh Bhatt	Sanjay Dutt, Kumar Gaurav, Amrita Singh, Poonam Dhillon, Nutan, Akash Khurana, Paresh Rawal	Crime thriller	
Nagina	Harmesh Malhotra	Rishi Kapoor, Sridevi, Prem Chopra, Amrish Puri, Jagdeep	Fantasy, romance	
Nain Mile Chain Kahan		Kamal Kapoor		
Naseeb Apna Apna	T. Rama Rao	Rishi Kapoor, Farha Naaz	Drama	
Nasihat	Aravind Sen	Rajesh Khanna, Shabana Azmi, Deepti Naval	Drama, family	
New Delhi Times	Ramesh Sharma	Shashi Kapoor, Sharmila Tagore, Om Puri, Kulbhushan Kharbanda	Drama	
Pahunchey Huwe Log	Johnny Walker	Shafi Inamdar, Rishi Kapoor, Meenakshi Seshadri, Shakti Kapoor	Comedy	
Palay Khan	Ashim S. Samanta	Jackie Shroff, Poonam Dhillon, Farha Naaz	Action, thriller	
Panchavati	Basu Bhattacharya	Akbar Khan, Deepti Naval, Suresh Oberoi		
Parampara	Prakash Jha			
Patton Ki Bazi	Ram Govind	Rajan Sippy, Khushbu, Swapna	Action	
Peechha Karro	Pankaj Parashar	Ravi Baswani, Kalpana Iyer, Amjad Khan	Comedy, thriller	
Preeti	Saawan Kumar	Prem Chopra, Rajiv Kapoor, Padmini Kolhapure	Drama	
Pyaar Ke Do Pal	Rajiv Mehra	Mithun Chakraborty, Jaya Prada, Simple Kapadia	Drama	
Pyar Ho Gaya	Girish Manukant	Avinash Wadhavan, Ranjeet Raj, Komal Mahuvakar	Romance	
Pyar Kiya Hai Pyar Karenge	Vijay Reddy	Anil Kapoor, Padmini Kolhapure, Anita Raj	Drama, romance	

== Films Q-Z ==
Title	Director	Cast	Genre	Sources
Qatil Aur Ashiq	Swaroop Kumar	Shoma Anand, Kalpana Iyer, Kanan Kaushal		
Qatl	R. K. Nayyar	Sanjeev Kumar, Ranjeeta Kaur, Shatrughan Sinha	Mystery, thriller	
Ram Milai Jodi	H. S. Kanwal	Kalpana Iyer, Lalita Pawar		
Ricky	Ashok V. Bhushan	Kunal Goswami, Nutan, Amrish Puri, Pran	Drama, family	
Sadaa Suhagan	T. Rama Rao	Jeetendra, Rekha, Govinda, Anuradha, Pran	Family, drama, romance	
Sajna Saath Nibhana	Jwalamukhi	Dr. Anand, Dharmendra, Satyendra Kapoor	Drama	
Samay Ki Dhaara	Sisir Mishra	Shatrughan Sinha, Shabana Azmi, Vinod Mehra	Drama	
Samundar	Rahul Rawail	Sunny Deol, Poonam Dhillon, Anupam Kher	Action, crime, drama, adventure, thriller	
Sasti Dulhan Mahenga Dulha	Bhappi Sonie	Mahesh Anand, Arun, Beena Banerjee	Drama	
Saveray Wali Gaadi	Bharathiraja	Sunny Deol, Poonam Dhillon, Prem Chopra		
Shart	Ketan Anand	Naseeruddin Shah, Shabana Azmi, Kanwaljit Singh	Drama, mystery, thriller	
Shatru	Pramod Chakravorty	Rajesh Khanna, Shabana Siddique, Ashok Kumar	Action, adventure, crime	
Sheela	Deepak Balraj Vij	Kulbhushan Kharbanda, Nana Patekar, Anita Kanwar	Adventure, thriller	
Sheesha	Basu Chatterjee	Mithun Chakraborty, Moon Moon Sen	Drama	
Singhasan	Krishna	Jeetendra, Jaya Prada, Mandakini		
Suhaagan	K. Raghavendra Rao	Jeetendra, Sridevi, Padmini Kolhapure	Drama	
Sultanat	Mukul S. Anand	Dharmendra, Sunny Deol, Sridevi	Period drama	
Swarag Se Sunder	K. Bapaiah	Jeetendra, Mithun Chakraborty, Padmini Kolhapure, Jaya Prada, Prem Chopra, Kader Khan		
Swarthi	Radhakant	Shafi Inamdar, Rana Jung Bahadur, Suresh Oberoi, Anupam Kher, Neeta Mehta		
Swati	Kranthi Kumar	Meenakshi Seshadri, Sharmila Tagore, Shashi Kapoor, Madhuri Dixit, Vinod Mehra	Drama	
Tahkhana	Shyam Ramsay, Tulsi Ramsay	Rana Jung Bahadur, Hemant Birje, Deepak	Action, drama, horror	
Tan-Badan	Anand	Govinda, Khushbu		
Teesra Kinara	Krishnakant	Raj Babbar, Smita Patil, Anita Raj	Romance	
Teri Aarzoo	Ranjeeta			
Trikon Ka Chauta Kon	Madhusudan	Vijayendra Ghatge, Priyadarshini, Swaroop Sampat		
Veer Bhimsen	Sushil Vyas	Jayshree Gadkar, Anjana Mumtaz, Dara Singh		Fantasy
Vikram Vetal	Shantilal Soni	Deepika, Manhar Desai, Anjana Mumtaz	Fantasy	
Yeh Preet Na Hogi Kam	Sheetal	Preeti Ganguli, Kiran Kumar		
Zindagani	Prabhat Roy	Rakhee Gulzar, Mithun Chakraborty, Rati Agnihotri		

== See also ==
- List of Hindi films of 1985
- List of Hindi films of 1987
