= List of Hindi films of 1984 =

== Highest-grossing films ==
The three highest-grossing films at the Indian box office in 1984 were:

Rank	Title	Gross collection
1	Tohfa	₹9 crore
2	Maqsad	₹8.5 crore
3	Sharaabi	₹8 crore

== Films ==
Title	Director	Cast	Genre	Sources
Aaj Ka M.L.A. Ram Avtar	Narayana Rao Dasari	Rajesh Khanna, Shabana Azmi, Deven Verma	Action, drama	
Aaj Ki Awaaz	Ravi Chopra	Raj Babbar, Smita Patil, Rashmi Chauhan	Action, drama, crime	
Aan Aur Shaan	Ravi Tandon	Rishi Kapoor, Shammi Kapoor, Ranjeet	Drama	
Aasmaan	Tony	Mukul Agarwal, Bhola, Birbal		
Ab Ayega Mazaa	Pankaj Parashar	Ravi Baswani, Raja Bundela, Pavan Malhotra	Comedy	
Abodh	Hiren Nag	Mohan Choti, Sheela David, Madhuri Dixit, Tapas Paul	Drama	
Akalmand	N. S. Rajbharath	Ashok Kumar, Jeetendra, Sridevi, Shakti Kapoor	Comedy, romance	
All Rounder	Mohan Kumar	Kumar Gaurav, Rati Agnihotri	Action, drama	
Anand Aur Anand	Dev Anand	Dev Anand, Suneil Anand, Raj Babbar	Family, drama, romance	
Andar Baahar	Raj N. Sippy	Beena Banerjee, Danny Denzongpa, Gulshan Grover	Action, thriller	
Andhi Gali	Buddhadeb Dasgupta	Deepti Naval, Mahesh Bhatt, Vikas Desai	Drama, thriller	
Apna Bhi Koi Hota	Girish Ranjan	Kavita, Sunil Pandey, Seema Deo		
Asha Jyoti	Narayana Rao Dasari	Rajesh Khanna, Reena Roy, Rekha	Drama, family, romance	
Aurat Ka Inteqam	B. R. Ishara	Vinod Mehra		
Awaaz	Shakti Samanta	Rajesh Khanna, Jaya Prada, Rakesh Roshan	Action, crime, drama	
Baazi	Raj N. Sippy	Dharmendra, Rekha, Mithun Chakraborty	Action	
Bad Aur Badnam	Feroz Chinoy	Anita Raj, Shreeram Lagoo, Parveen Babi	Family, thriller	
Bhavna	Pravin Bhatt	Shabana Azmi, Marc Zuber, Saeed Jaffrey	Drama	
Bhemaa	Dinesh Saxena	Brahm Bhardwaj, Bharat Bhushan, Birbal	Action, crime, drama	
Bhookha Sher		Manorama, Rajinikanth, Seema	Action	
Bindiya Chamkegi	Tarun Dutt	Rekha, Vinod Mehra, Johnny Walker	Comedy, family	
Boxer	Raj N. Sippy	Tanuja, Mithun Chakraborty, Rati Agnihotri, Danny Denzongpa, Iftekhar, Yusuf Khan	Action, crime, drama, adventure	
Captain Barry	Surjit Gill	Kalpana Iyer, Mac Mohan, Priyadarshini		
Chandani Bani Chudel	R. Mittal	Vijay Solanki, Reena Kapoor, Nisha	Drama, horror	
Dharm Aur Qanoon	Joshi	Rajesh Khanna, Dharmendra, Vinod Mehra	Adventure, crime, thriller	
Dhokebaaz	Chand	Ranjeeta Kaur, Amjad Khan, Prema Narayan	Action	
Dilawar		Kim Yashpal, Sachin Pilgaonkar		
Divorce		Sharmila Tagore, Girish Karnad, Abhi Bhattacharya	Romance, drama	
Duniya	Ramesh Talwar	Dilip Kumar, Rishi Kapoor, Amrita Singh, Amrish Puri, Pran	Action	
Ek Nai Paheli	K. Balachander	Raaj Kumar, Hema Malini, Kamal Haasan	Drama	
Ek Swaal Munni Ka	Balwant Dullat	Sagar Arya, Sulabha Arya, Suchita Trivedi		
Farishta	Sunil Sikand	Ashok Kumar, Kanwaljit Singh, Smita Patil, Pran	Drama	
Gangvaa	Rajasekhar	Rajinikanth, Shabana Azmi, Sarika	Action	
Ghar Ek Mandir	K. Bapaiah	Shashi Kapoor, Moushumi Chatterjee, Mithun Chakraborty, Raj Kiran, Shoma Anand, Ranjeeta, Kader Khan, Shakti Kapoor, Oberoi	Drama	
Giddh	T. S. Ranga	Om Puri, Smita Patil, Nana Patekar	Drama	
Grahasthi	Prashant Nanda	Yogeeta Bali, Bharat Bhushan, Ramesh Deo		
Haisiyat	Narayana Rao Dasari	Jeetendra, Jaya Prada, Pran	Crime, drama, family	
Hanste Khelte	Dayanand	Mithun Chakraborty, Vijayendra Ghatge, Jagdeep	Crime	
Hip Hip Hurray	Prakash Jha	Satish Anand, Ram Gopal Bajaj, Nikhil Bhagat	Sports drama	
Holi	Ketan Mehta	Aamir Khan, Ashutosh Gowariker	Drama	
Hum Do Hamare Do	B. R. Ishara	Raj Babbar, Smita Patil, Shoma Anand	Drama, family	
Hum Hain Lajawab	Mohan Segal	Kumar Gaurav, Padmini Kolhapure, Monty Nath	Action, comedy, drama, family, romance	
Hum Rahe Na Hum	Chetan Anand, Ketan Anand	Vijay Anand, Shabana Azmi, Rehana Sultan		
Inquilaab	T. Rama Rao	Amitabh Bachchan, Sridevi, Kader Khan, Shakti Kapoor, Ranjeet	Action, drama	
Inquilab Ke Baad	Utpal Dutt	Utpal Dutt, Robi Ghosh		
Insaaf Kaun Karega	Sudarshan Nag	Dharmendra, Rajinikanth, Jaya Prada	Action	
Inteha	Shibu Mitra	Raj Babbar, Reena Roy, Shakti Kapoor	Drama, family	
Jaag Utha Insan	K. Vishwanathan	Deven Verma, Sujit Kumar, Beena Banerjee	Drama, family	
Jagir	Pramod Chakravorty	Dharmendra, Mithun Chakraborty, Zeenat Aman, Shoma Anand, Pran, Danny Denzongpa, Ranjeet, Amrish Puri	Action, crime, drama	
Jawaani	Ramesh Behl	Karan Shah, Neelam Kothari, Moushumi Chatterjee	Romance, drama	
Jeene Nahi Doonga	Rajkumar Kohli	Dharmendra, Shatrughan Sinha, Raj Babbar	Action	
John Jani Janardhan	T. Rama Rao	Rajinikanth, Rati Agnihotri, Poonam Dhillon, Kader Khan	Action, comedy, romance	
Jhutha Sach	Esmayeel Shroff	Dharmendra, Rekha, Amrish Puri	Drama, family	
Kaamyab	K. Raghavendra Rao	Asrani, Shabana Azmi, Rita Bhaduri		
Kahan Tak Aasmaan Hai	Mehmood Kureshi		Action	
Kamla	Jag Mundhra	Shabana Azmi, Deepti Naval, Marc Zuber	Drama	
Kanoon Kya Karega	Mukul Anand	Suresh Oberoi, Deepti Naval, Iftekhar	Thriller	
Kanoon Meri Mutthi Mein	K. Prasad	Raj Babbar, Smita Patil, Kader Khan	Action	
Karishmaa	I. V. Sasi	Reena Roy, Kamal Haasan, Tina Munim	Thriller	
Kasam Paida Karne Wale Ki	B. Subhash	Mithun Chakraborty, Smita Patil, Salma Agha, Amrish Puri	Action, family	
Khandhar	Mrinal Sen	Shabana Azmi, Annu Kapoor, Pankaj Kapur	Drama	
Laila	Saawan Kumar	Sunil Dutt, Poonam Dhillon, Anil Kapoor, Pran	Musical, romance	
Lakhon Ki Baat	Basu Chatterji	Sanjeev Kumar, Farooq Sheikh, Anita Raj	Comedy, romance, musical	
Lorie	Vijay Talwar	Shabana Azmi, Farooq Sheikh, Swaroop Sampat	Drama, crime, family	
Love Marriage	Mehul Kumar	Anil Kapoor, Meenakshi Seshadri, Asrani	Drama	
Maan Maryada	R. P. Swamy	Sadashiv Amrapurkar, Birbal, Gajanan Jagirdar	Action	
Mahadaan	S.M Abbas	Kanwar Avtaar, Priya Tendulkar	Drama	
Maati Maangey Khoon	Raj Khosla	Shatrughan Sinha, Raj Babbar, Rekha	Action, thriller	
Manzil Manzil	Nasir Hussain	Sunny Deol, Dimple Kapadia	Romance	
Maqsad	K. Bapaiah	Rajesh Khanna, Jeetendra, Jaya Prada	Action, crime, musical	
Mashaal	Yash Chopra	Dilip Kumar, Anil Kapoor, Rati Agnihotri, Waheeda Rehman, Amrish Puri	Action	
Maya Bazaar	Babubhai Mistri	Dara Singh, Rakesh Pandey, Rita Bhaduri		
Meraa Dost Meraa Dushman	Raj Khosla	Shatrughan Sinha, Smita Patil, Geeta Behl	Action	
Mera Faisla	S. V. Rajendra Singh	Sanjay Dutt, Rati Agnihotri, Jaya Prada, Pran		
Meri Adalat	A. T. Raghu	Rajinikanth, Sonia Sahni, Kader Khan	Action, thriller	
Mohabbat Ki Aag				
Mohan Joshi Hazir Ho!	Saeed Akhtar Mirza	Salim Ghouse, Mohan Gokhale, Rohini Hattangadi	Parallel	
Mujhe Shakti Do		Vinod Mehra		
Nadaniyan		Prem Krishan		
Naya Kadam	K. Raghavendra Rao	Rajesh Khanna, Padmini Kolhapure, Sridevi	Family, romance, drama	
Paapi Pet Ka Sawaal Hai	Sohanlal Kanwar	Rajesh Khanna, Jaya Prada, Shatrughan Sinha		
Paar	Goutam Ghose	Naseeruddin Shah, Shabana Azmi, Utpal Dutt	Drama	
Pakhandi	Samir Ganguly	Shashi Kapoor, Sanjeev Kumar, Zeenat Aman		
Paroma	Aparna Sen	Rakhee Gulzar, Aparna Sen, Mukul Sharma	Drama	
Party	Govind Nihalani	Deepa Sahi, Ila Arun, Mohan Bhandari	Drama	
Pavitra Ganga	H. N. Reddy	Nirupa Roy		
Pet Pyaar Aur Paap	Durai	Raj Babbar, Smita Patil, Tanuja	Drama, family	
Phulwari	Mukul Dutt	Debashree Roy, Shashi Puri, Ashok Saraf	Drama, family	
Preet Na Jane Reet		Bharat Kapoor		
Purana Mandir	Shyam Ramsay, Tulsi Ramsay	Mohnish Bahl, Arti Gupta, Puneet Issar	Comedy, drama, horror	
Qaidi		Jeetendra, Shatrughan Sinha, Hema Malini, Madhavi	Action	
Raaj Tilak	Rajkumar Kohli	Dharmendra, Hema Malini, Pran	Action, drama	
Raavan	Johny Bakshi	Smita Patil, Vikram, Gulshan Arora	Drama, family	
Raja Aur Rana	Shibu Mitra	Ajit, Chandrashekhar, Mohan Choti, Pran	Action, comedy, crime, drama	
Rakta Bandhan	Rajat Rakshit	Rati Agnihotri, Birbal, Mithun Chakraborty	Action, comedy, crime, drama	
Ram Ki Ganga	Haran K. Chand	Brahm Bhardwaj, Bindu, Birbal	Drama	
Ram Tera Desh	Swaroop Kumar	Hema Malini, Ashok Kumar, Vijayendra Ghatge		
Ranjhan Mera Yaar		Dharmendra		
Saaransh	Mahesh Bhatt	Anupam Kher, Rohini Hattangadi, Soni Razdan, Madan Jain	Drama	
Sasural		Dina Pathak, Sadhana Singh		
Seepeeyan	Akash Jain	Kanwaljit Singh, Debashree Roy, Om Puri	Drama	
Shapath	Ravikant Nagaich	Raj Babbar, Smita Patil, Ranjeet	Action	
Sharaabi	Prakash Mehra	Amitabh Bachchan, Jaya Prada, Pran, Om Prakash	Comedy, drama	
Sheeshay Ka Ghar	Amit Khanna	Raj Babbar, Vikas Desai, Padmini Kolhapure		
Sharara	S. V. Rajendra Singh	Mithun Chakraborty, Kader Khan, Raaj Kumar	Action	
Shravan	Chandrakant	Chandrima Bhaduri, Abhi Bhattacharya, Bharat Bhushan		
Sohni Mahiwal	Umesh Mehra, Latif Faiziyev	Sunny Deol, Poonam Dhillon, Pran, Zeenat Aman	Action, adventure, drama, romance, family	
Sunny	Raj Khosla	Sunny Deol, Amrita Singh	Romance, drama	
Tarang	Kumar Shahani	Jeetendra, Rekha, Moushumi Chatterjee	Drama, family	
Tarkeeb	Ravikant Nagaich	Mithun Chakraborty, Shakti Kapoor, Ranjeeta Kaur	Action	
Taru	Ram Mohan		Animation	
Tere Mere Beech Mein	Dada Kondke	Jayshree T.	Comedy, drama, romance	
Teri Baahon Mein	Umesh Mehra	Mohnish Bahl, Ayesha Shroff, Navin Nischol	Romance	
Tohfa	Raghavendra Rao	Jeetendra, Sridevi, Jaya Prada	Action	
Unchi Uraan	Jagjit Khurana	Suresh Chatwal, P. Jairaj, Javed Khan	Drama, romance	
Utsav	Girish Karnad	Rekha, Amjad Khan, Kulbhushan Kharbanda	Drama	
Wanted: Dead or Alive	Ambrish Sangal	Mithun Chakraborty, Tina Munim	Action, crime, drama	
Waqt Ki Pukar	Desh Gautam	Shoma Anand, Yogeeta Bali, Vijayendra Ghatge		
Waqt Se Pehle	Govind Saraiya			
Yaadgaar	Dasari Narayana Rao	Sanjeev Kumar, Kamal Haasan, Poonam Dhillon	Action, comedy, drama	
Yaadon Ki Zanjeer	Shibu Mitra	Sunil Dutt, Shashi Kapoor, Reena Roy		
Yahan Wahan	Rajat Rakshit	Aruna Irani, Jagdeep, Surinder Kaur		
Yeh Desh	T. Rama Rao	Zeenat Aman, Kamal Haasan, Jeetendra	Action, drama	
Yeh Ishq Nahin Aasaan	Tinnu Anand	Rishi Kapoor, Padmini Kolhapure, Asrani	Romance	
Yeh Kahani Nahi	Biplab Roy Chowdhury			
Zakhmi Sher	Narayana Rao Dasari	Jeetendra, Dimple Kapadia, Amrish Puri	Action, thriller	
Zameen Aasman	Bharat Rangachary	Shashi Kapoor, Sanjay Dutt, Rekha		
Zindagi Jeene Ke Liye	K. S. Sethu Madhavan	Rakhee Gulzar, Suresh Oberoi, Vijay Arora		

== See also ==
- List of Hindi films of 1983
- List of Hindi films of 1985
