= List of Hindi films of 1985 =

This is a list of films produced by the Bollywood film industry based in Mumbai in 1985:

== Highest-grossing films ==
The highest-grossing films at the Indian box office in 1985 were:

| Rank | Title | Gross collection |
|---|---|---|
| 1 | Ram Teri Ganga Maili | ₹19 crore |
| 2 | Mard | ₹16 crore |
| 3 | Pyar Jhukta Nahin | ₹9 crore |

== Films ==
| Title | Director | Cast | Genre | Sources |
|---|---|---|---|---|
| Aaj Ka Daur | K. Bapaiah | Nirupa Roy, Anwar Ali, Shoma Anand | Action, crime, drama | |
| Aakhir Kyon? | J. Om Prakash | Rajesh Khanna, Tina Munim, Smita Patil, Rakesh Roshan | Drama, family | |
| Aandhi-Toofan | Babbar Subhash | Shashi Kapoor, Hema Malini, Mithun Chakraborty, Meenakshi, Danny Denzongpa | Action | |
| Aar Paar | Shakti Samanta | Mithun Chakraborty, Rozina, Nuton, Utpal Dutt | Romance, drama | |
| Adventures of Tarzan | Babbar Subhash | Hemant Birje, Raja Duggal, Kimi Katkar | Action, adventure, romance | |
| Aghaat | Govind Nihalani | Om Puri, Gopi, Pankaj Kapur | Drama, crime | |
| Aitbaar | Mukul Anand | Raj Babbar, Dimple Kapadia, Suresh Oberoi, Danny Denzongpa, Sharat Saxena | Thriller | |
| Alag Alag | Shakti Samanta | Rajesh Khanna, Shashi Kapoor, Tina Munim | Family, musical, romance | |
| Ameer Aadmi Gharib Aadmi | Amjad Khan | Zeenat Aman, Rabia Amin | Drama | |
| Anantyatra | Jayoo Patwardhan, Nachiket Patwardhan | Vikas Desai, Rohini Hattangadi, Sudhir Joshi | | |
| Ankahee | Amol Palekar | Anil Chatterjee, Shriram Lagoo, Vinod Mehra | Drama | |
| Anokha Modh | Kamal Chandhok | Vinay, Prerana Khanna, Vyjayanti Chavan | | |
| Arjun | Rahul Rawail | Sunny Deol, Dimple Kapadia, Raj Kiran | Action | |
| Aurat Pair Ki Juti Nahin Hai | B. K. Adarsh | Gulshan Grover, Deepti Naval, Marc Zuber | Drama | |
| Awara Baap | Sohanlal Kanwar | Rajesh Khanna, Meenakshi Seshadri, Madhuri Dixit, Rajan Sippy | Drama | |
| Ba Ki Yaad Mein | Ketan Mehta | | | |
| Baadal | Anand Sagar | Shammi Kapoor, Mithun Chakraborty, Poonam Dhillon | Drama | |
| Babu | A. C. Tirulokchandar | Rajesh Khanna, Hema Malini, Mala Sinha, Rati Agnihotri | Drama, family | |
| Bahu Ki Awaaz | Shashilal K. Nair | Vikas Anand, Bharat Bhushan, B.L. Chopra | Drama | |
| Balidaan | S. A. Chandrasekhar | Anuradha, Vijay Arora, Asrani | Action, thriller | |
| Bandhan Anjana | Prabhat Roy | Chandrashekhar, Utpal Dutt, Mazhar Khan | | |
| Bepanaah | Jagdish Sidana | Shashi Kapoor, Mithun Chakraborty, Poonam Dhillon | Drama, family | |
| Bewafai | R. Thyagarajan | Rajesh Khanna, Rajinikanth, Meenakshi Seshadri, Tina, Padmini Kolhapure, Pran | Crime, drama, family, romance | |
| Bhago Bhut Aaya | Krishna Naidu | Ashok Kumar, Aruna Irani, Deven Verma | Fantasy, action, adventure | |
| Bhagwan Shri Krishna | Ram Kumar Bohra | Ajit Bhalla, Kumud Bole, Manher Desai | Fantasy, action, adventure | |
| Bhavani Junction | Dinesh | Shashi Kapoor, Shatrughan Sinha, Zeenat Aman, Rati Agnihotri | Action, crime, thriller | |
| Bond 303 | Ravi Tandon | Jeetendra, Tom Alter, Parveen Babi, Prem Chopra | Spy drama | |
| Chaar Maharathi | S. Waris Ali | Mithun Chakraborty, Tina Munim, Kader Khan | Action | |
| Damul | Prakash Jha | Annu Kapoor, Sreela Majumdar, Deepti Naval | Drama | |
| Debshishu | Utpalendu Chakrabarty | Sadhu Meher, Smita Patil | Drama | |
| Dekha Pyar Tumhara | Virendra Sharma | Kamal Haasan, Rati Agnihotri, Deven Verma | Comedy, drama | |
| Do Dilon Ki Dastaan | A. C. Tirulokchandar | Sanjay Dutt, Padmini Kolhapure, Shakti Kapoor | Romance | |
| Durgaa | Shibu Mitra | Rajesh Khanna, Hema Malini, Pran | Action, crime | |
| Ek Chitthi Pyar Bhari | Vijay Sadanah | Raj Babbar, Reena Roy, Agha | Drama | |
| Ek Daku Saher Mein | Kalidas | Ashok Kumar, Pradeep Kumar, Suresh Oberoi | | |
| Ek Se Bhale Do | S.V. Rajendra Singh | Rati Agnihotri, Balwant Dullat, Kumar Gaurav | Action, comedy, drama, romance | |
| Faasle | Yash Chopra | Farooq Sheikh, Deepti Naval, Sunil Dutt | Romance | |
| Geraftaar | Prayag Raaj | Amitabh Bachchan, Madhavi, Kamal Haasan, Poonam Dhillon, Rajinikanth | Action, adventure, drama, musical, family | |
| Ghar Dwaar | Kalpataru | Tanuja, Sachin, Raj Kiran | Drama | |
| Ghulami | J. P. Dutta | Dharmendra, Mithun Chakraborty, Naseeruddin Shah, Reena Roy, Smita Patil, Anita Raj, Kulbhushan Kharbanda | Action | |
| Gokula | Arundhati Devi | | | |
| Golimar | | | | |
| Haqeeqat | T. Rama Rao | Asrani, Raj Babbar, Beena Banerjee | Political drama | |
| Haveli | Keshu Ramsay | Rakesh Roshan, Marc Zuber, Aaloka | Horror, crime, thriller | |
| Hoshiyar | K. Raghavendra Rao | Jeetendra, Shatrughan Sinha, Jaya Prada, Meenakshi Seshadri, Asrani, Pran | Action | |
| Hum Dono | B. S. Glaad | Rajesh Khanna, Hema Malini, Reena Roy | Comedy, musical, romance, family | |
| Hum Naujawan | Dev Anand | Dev Anand, Bunty Behl, Richa Sharma | Action, drama, family | |
| Insaaf Main Karoonga | Shibu Mitra | Rajesh Khanna, Padmini Kolhapure, Tina Munim | Crime, mystery, thriller | |
| Jaago | | Kamal Kapoor | | |
| Jaan Ki Baazi | Ajay Kashyap | Sanjay Dutt, Anita Raj, Anuradha Patel | Action | |
| Jaanoo | Jainendra Jain | Jackie Shroff, Khushbu, Rati Agnihotri | | |
| Janam | Mahesh Bhatt | Kumar Gaurav, Anupam Kher, Anita Kanwar | Autobiography | |
| Jawaab | Ravi Tandon | Vikas Anand, Raj Babbar, Abhi Bhattacharya | Romance, thriller | |
| Jhoothi | Hrishikesh Mukherjee | Rekha, Raj Babbar, Amol Palekar | Comedy | |
| Kabhi Ajnabi The | | Ramesh Deo, Debashree Roy, Poonam Dhillon | Romance, sport | |
| Kala Suraj | Desh Gautam | Sulakshana Pandit, Rakesh Roshan, Shatrughan Sinha | | |
| Kali Basti | Sudesh Issar | Shatrughan Sinha, Reena Roy, Vijayendra Ghatge | | |
| Karishma Kudrat Kaa | Sunil Hingorani | Rati Agnihotri, Urmila Bhatt, Mithun Chakraborty | Action | |
| Karm Yudh | Swaroop Kumar | Mithun Chakraborty, Anita Raj, Pran, Amrish Puri | | |
| Khamosh | Vidhu Vinod Chopra | Shabana Azmi, Amol Palekar, Sudhir Mishra | Mystery, thriller | |
| Lallu Ram | Shiv Kumar | Urmila Bhatt, Vyjayanti Chavan, Gajendra Chouhan | Action, comedy, drama | |
| Lava | Ravindra Peepat | Raj Babbar, Dimple Kapadia, Asha Parekh | Family, drama | |
| Lover Boy | Shomu Mukerji | Rajiv Kapoor, Meenakshi Seshadri, Anita Raj | | |
| Maa Kasam | Shibu Mittra | Mithun Chakraborty, Divya Rana, Ranjeet, Pran | Action | |
| Maha Shaktimaan | Swamy V.S.R. | Raj Babbar, Meenakshi Seshadri, Kim | | |
| Mahaguru | S. S. Ravichandra | Rajinikanthh, Meenakshi Seshadri, Nirupa Roy | Action, comedy, crime, drama | |
| Mahasati Tulsi | Radhakant | Rajni Bala, Kalpana Divan, Mohan Gokhale | Adventure, drama, fantasy, history | |
| Main Khilona Nahin | | Kaajal Kiran, Jayshree T. | | |
| Mard | Manmohan Desai | Amitabh Bachchan, Amrita Singh, Prem Chopra, Helena Luke, Nirupa Roy, Dara Singh | Action | |
| Massey Sahib | Pradip Krishen | Raghuvir Yadav, Barry John, Arundhati Roy | Drama | |
| Masterji | K. Raghavendra Rao | Rajesh Khanna, Sridevi, Anita Raj | Comedy, drama | |
| Mati Manas | Mani Kaul | | Documentary | |
| Meetha Zehar | Mohinder | Padmini Kapila, Bharat Kapoor, Deepak Parashar | | |
| Mehak | Chander Bahl | Vijayendra Ghatge, Deepak Parashar, Shoma Anand | Family | |
| Mera Jawab | N. S. Raj Bharath | Jackie Shroff, Meenakshi Seshadri, Shakti Kapoor | | |
| Mera Damad | Partho Ghosh, Salil Choudhury | Farooq Sheikh, Zarina Wahab | Romance | |
| Mera Saathi | K. Raghavendra Rao | Asrani, Bharat Bhushan, Aruna Irani | Drama | |
| Meraa Ghar Mere Bachche | Chander Vohra | Raj Babbar, Smita Patil, Meenakshi Seshadri | Drama, family | |
| Meri Jung | Subhash Ghai | Anil Kapoor, Meenakshi Seshadri, Nutan, Khushbu, Javed Jaffrey, Amrish Puri | Crime thriller | |
| Misaal | Mirza Brothers | Naseeruddin Shah, Vijayata Pandit, Shahrukh Mirza | Action | |
| Mohabbat | Bapu | Anil Kapoor, Vijayata Pandit, Aruna Irani | Romance | |
| Mujhe Kasam Hai | | Kaajal Kiran, Talluri Rameshwari | | |
| Murde Ki Jaan Khatre Mein | | Kunal Kapoor, Roma Manik, Mehmood Jr. | | |
| Nasoor | Ashok Chopra | Om Puri, Priya Tendulkar, Sadashiv Amrapurkar | Drama | |
| Oonche Log | Brij | Rajesh Khanna, Salma Agha, Pradeep Kumar | Drama, family | |
| Paapi Sansar | | Surendra Pal, Sadhana Singh, Nandita Thakur | | |
| Paisa Yeh Paisa | Sohanlal Kanwar | Jackie Shroff, Meenakshi Seshadri, Bindu, Gulshan Grover, Amrish Puri | Action, crime, drama | |
| Pataal Bhairavi | K. Bapaiah | Jeetendra, Jaya Prada, Pran | Fantasy, drama | |
| Paththar | Deepak Bahry | Om Puri, Anuradha Patel, Deepika | Crime | |
| Patthar Dil | Surendra Mohan | Padmini Kolhapure, Danny Denzongpa, Kader Khan | | |
| Phaansi Ke Baad | Harmesh Malhotra | Ajit, Vikas Anand, Bandini | Drama | |
| Phir Aayee Barsaat | Jaiprakashk Vinayak | Harindranath Chattopadhyay, Saeed Jaffrey, Javed Khan | Romance | |
| Piya Milan | | Sachin, Sadhana Singh | | |
| Pighalta Aasman | Shammi | Shashi Kapoor, Rakhee Gulzar, Rati Agnihotri | Comedy, drama, romance | |
| Pyaari Bhabhi | K.C. Agarwal | Lalita Pawar, Kanwaljit Singh | | |
| Pyar Jhukta Nahin | Vijay Sadanah | Mithun Chakraborty, Padmini Kolhapure, Danny Denzongpa | Family, romance | |
| Pyari Behna | Bapu | Mithun Chakraborty, Padmini Kolhapure, Tanvi Azmi | Action, comedy, drama | |
| Rahi Badal Gaye | Ravi Tandon | Rishi Kapoor, Shabana Azmi, Padmini Kolhapure | Romance | |
| Ram Tere Kitne Nam | P. Madhavan | Sanjeev Kumar, Rekha, Prem Chopra | Drama, family | |
| Ram Teri Ganga Maili | Raj Kapoor | Rajiv Kapoor, Mandakini, Divya Rana, Shammi Kapoor, Kulbhushan Kharbanda, Sushma Seth | Romance, drama | |
| Ramkali | Sham Ralhan | Shatrughan Sinha, Hema Malini, Nirupa Roy | | |
| Rao Saheb | Vijaya Mehta | Arvind Gadgil, Chandrakant Gokhale, Vasant Ingle | Comedy, drama | |
| Rehguzar | | | | |
| Rusvai | | Sanjeev Kumar, Raj Babbar | Musical | |
| Saagar | Ramesh Sippy | Rishi Kapoor, Kamal Haasan, Dimple Kapadia, Saeed Jaffrey, Nadira | Romance, drama | |
| Saaheb | Anil Ganguly | Anil Kapoor, Amrita Singh, Raakhee, Utpal Dutt, Deven Verma | Drama | |
| Saamri | Shyam Ramsay, Tulsi Ramsay | Anirudh Agarwal, Rajan Sippy, Aarti Gupta | Horror | |
| Sajan Tara Sambharna | Abbas Mustan | | | |
| Sanjhi | | Sadashiv Amrapurkar, Naina Behl, Goga Kapoor | Drama | |
| Sanjog | K. Vishwanath | Jeetendra, Jaya Prada, Vinod Mehra | Romance | |
| Sarfarosh | Dasari Narayana Rao | Asrani, Bharat Bhushan, Bindu, Pran | | |
| Sautela Pati | B. R. Ishara | Raj Kiran, Devendra Khandelwal, Asha Sachdev | | |
| Shiva Ka Insaaf | Raj N. Sippy | Birbal, Poonam Dhillon, Gulshan Grover | Superhero | |
| Sitamgar | Raj N. Sippy | Dharmendra, Rishi Kapoor, Parveen Babi, Poonam Dhillon | Action | |
| Sur Sangam | K. Vishwanath | Girish Karnad, Jaya Prada, Sachin | Comedy, drama, musical | |
| Surkhiyaan (The Headlines) | Ashok Tyagi | Arun Bakshi, Brahm Bhardwaj, Krishan Dhawan | Action, crime, drama | |
| Tawaif | B. R. Chopra | Ashok Kumar, Rishi Kapoor, Rati Agnihotri | Comedy, drama, romance, family | |
| Telephone | Shyam Ramsay, Tulsi Ramsay | Vikas Anand, Parveen Babi, Dr. Satish Chopra | Thriller | |
| Teri Meherbaniyan | Vijay Reddi | Jackie Shroff, Poonam Dhillon, Raj Kiran | Action, crime, drama, family | |
| Teri Pooja Kare Sansaar | Bharat Kapoor | | | |
| Trikal | Shyam Benegal | Leela Naidu, Neena Gupta, Anita Kanwar | Drama | |
| Triveni | Rajan Thakur | Raj Babbar, Rati Agnihotri, Purnima | | |
| Ulta Seedha | Subodh Mukerji | Raj Babbar, Rati Agnihotri, Deven Verma | Comedy | |
| Uttarayan | Lekh Tandon | | | |
| Wafadaar | Narayana Rao Dasari, Pilla Srinivas | Rajinikanth, Padmini Kolhapure, Vijayata Pandit | Drama | |
| Yaadon Ki Kasam | Vinod Dewan | Mithun Chakraborty, Zeenat Aman, Shakti Kapoor | Action | |
| Yaar Kasam | K. Prasad | Raj Babbar, Zeenat Aman, Anita Raj | | |
| Yudh | Rajiv Rai | Jackie Shroff, Anil Kapoor, Tina Munim, Pran, Hema Malini, Shatrughan Sinha, Danny Denzongpa | Action | |
| Zabardast | Nasir Husain | Sanjeev Kumar, Sunny Deol, Jaya Prada | Action, drama | |
| Zamana | Ramesh Talwar | Rajesh Khanna, Rishi Kapoor, Poonam Dhillon | Action, crime, drama, thriller, romance | |
| Zulm Ka Badla | K. Prasad | Ameeta, Minoo Babbar, Master Bunty | Action, crime, drama | |

== See also ==
- List of Hindi films of 1984
- List of Hindi films of 1986
