= Anoop Kumar =

Indian actor (1926–1997)

- Kumar (left) with his brothers and mother.
- Born: Kalyan Kumar Ganguly; 24 March 1926; Khandwa, Central Provinces and Berar, British India (present-day Madhya Pradesh, India)
- Died: 20 September 1997 (aged 71); Mumbai, Maharashtra, India
- Occupations: Actor, painter, film producer
- Years active: 1950–1996
- Spouse: Manjula Banerjee (m. 1948)
- Children: Chandra Ganguly Sanyal (daughter); Arjun Kumar Ganguly (son)
- Relatives: See Ganguly family

Anoop Kumar (born Kalyan Kumar Ganguly; 24 March 1926 – 20 September 1997), was an Indian actor who appeared in over sixty-five Bollywood films.

== Personal life ==
Kalyan was born om 24 March 1926 into a Hindu Bengali family in Khandwa, Central Provinces and Berar (now in Madhya Pradesh). His father, Kunjalal Ganguly, was a lawyer, and his mother, Gauri Devi, came from a wealthy family. He was the second-youngest of four siblings, the other three being Ashok Kumar (the eldest), Sati Devi (wife of Sashadhar Mukherjee), and Kishore Kumar (the youngest). He married Manjula Banerjee alias Dheera, daughter of Mohit Kumar Banerjee, the diwan to the Maharaja of Murshidabad, and Kunjabala Mukherjee, on 18 November 1948. They had a daughter Chandra Ganguly Sanyal and a son Arjun Kumar Ganguly (born 5 March 1957).

== Career ==
After marriage, Kalyan arrived in Bombay (now Mumbai) with his newly wedded wife for his honeymoon when suddenly he was asked to stand in as double for his elder brother Ashok Kumar in Nishana (1950). He soon got a role alongside his elder brother in Khilari (1950). His performances eventually got the eyes of Amiya Chakraborty who cast him in the lead role in his film Gauna (1950) opposite Usha Kiran and Purnima Das Verma, alongside giving him his screen name Anoop Kumar. He then played both side and lead roles in several films but did not attain much success like his brothers Ashok Kumar or Kishore Kumar. Throughout his career, he collaborated with his brothers multiple times. He also produced the film Aasoo Ban Gaye Phool (1969). Kumar is best remembered for his role in the movie Chalti Ka Naam Gaadi. He and his brother Ashok Kumar acted in the 1986 Doordarshan detective serial Bheem Bhawani.

== Death ==
Kumar died on Saturday, 20 September 1997 following a cardiac arrest. He was 71 and survived by four daughters and a son. At 4:15 AM that day, he died of his fourth heart attack in the Aryogyanidhi hospital, Juhu, North West Bombay, where he was admitted the previous Saturday (13 September). The last rites were performed by his son Arjun on Saturday afternoon at the Juhu crematorium. Amit Kumar, Leena Ganguly and Asha Parekh were among those present. However, 85-year-old Ashok Kumar could not attend the funeral due to illness.

== Filmography ==
=== Hindi Films ===
Year	Film	Role	Notes
1950	Nishana		Debut film; appeared as elder brother & lead actor Ashok Kumar's body double.
1950	Khilari		First proper role, appeared alongside elder brother Ashok Kumar who played the lead.
1950	Gauna		First film as the leading man, director Amiya Chakraborty rechristened him as Anoop Kumar with this film.
1952	Rani		
1952	Vidyasagar		
1953	Firdaus		
1954	Samaj		Appeared alongside elder brother & lead actor Ashok Kumar.
1956	Sajani		
1957	Bandi	Dr. Madan Chaubey	Appeared alongside elder brother Ashok Kumar & younger brother Kishore Kumar.
1957	Dekh Kabira Roya	Mohan	
1957	Jeevan Saathi		Appeared alongside elder brother & lead actor Ashok Kumar.
1957	Sheroo		Appeared alongside elder brother & lead actor Ashok Kumar.
1958	Chalti Ka Naam Gaadi	Jagmohan Sharma (Jaggu)	Appeared alongside elder brother Ashok Kumar & younger brother Kishore Kumar who also co-produced it.
1959	Chacha Zindabad	Ramesh	
1959	Fashionable Wife	Natwar	
1959	Naach Ghar		Appeared alongside elder brother & lead actor Ashok Kumar.
1959	Nai Raahen		Appeared alongside elder brother & lead actor Ashok Kumar.
1961	Dark Street		
1961	Jhumroo	Ramesh	
1961	Junglee	Jeevan	
1961	Kismet Palat Ke Dekh		
1961	Krorepati	Himmat Rai	
1962	Bezuban		Appeared alongside elder brother & lead actor Ashok Kumar & nephew Aroop Kumar Ganguly.
1964	Kashmir Ki Kali	Chander	
1965	Bahu Beti	Gurudas	
1965	Bheegi Raat	Kunwar	Uncredited; Appeared alongside elder brother Ashok Kumar.
1965	Mahabharat	Uttara's brother	
1965	Shreeman Funtoosh	Ranjan	Appeared alongside younger brother & lead actor Kishore Kumar.
1967	Hum Do Daaku	Jaggu	Appeared alongside younger brother & lead actor Kishore Kumar.
1967	Jab Yaad Kisi Ki Aati Hai	Ustad	
1967	Raat Aur Din	Dr. Kumar	
1968	Dil Aur Mohabbat	Anoop	
1969	Ansoo Ban Gaye Phool	Shyam Rao	Also co-producer; appeared alongside elder brother Ashok Kumar.
1970	Prem Pujari	Kulbhushan	
1972	Amar Prem		
1972	Rakhi Aur Hathkadi	Vikram	Appeared alongside elder brother Ashok Kumar.
1972	Victoria No. 203	Murali	Appeared alongside elder brother Ashok Kumar.
1973	Anhonee	An inmate at mental instituition	
1974	Majboor	The frightened aeroplane passenger	Guest appearance
1974	Nirmaan	Sameer	
1975	Chori Mera Kaam	Police Constable	
1975	Mutthi Bhar Chawal		
1976	Ek Se Badhkar Ek	Security guard	Appeared alongside elder brother Ashok Kumar.
1976	Kitne Paas Kitne Door		
1976	Mrigayaa : The Royal Hunt		
1977	Proxy		
1978	Anmol Tasveer		Appeared alongside elder brother Ashok Kumar.
1978	Chor Ho To Aisa		
1978	Chor Ke Ghar Chor	Inspector	Appeared alongside elder brother Ashok Kumar.
1980	Neeyat		Guest appearance
1982	Chalti Ka Naam Zindagi	Jagmohan	Appeared alongside elder brother Ashok Kumar & younger brother Kishore Kumar who also produced & directed it.
1982	Tumhare Bina	Divakar	
1983	Farz Ki Keemat		
1983	Kaya Palat	Inspector	
1984	Love Marriage	Chaurangi	
1986	Bhim Bhawani		Television film; appeared alongside elder brother Ashok Kumar.
1987	Gayak		
1987	Jawab Hum Denge	Jagmohan	Appeared alongside elder brother Ashok Kumar.
1987	Parivaar	Dinesh	
1989	Clerk	Mukherjee	Appeared alongside elder brother Ashok Kumar.
1989	Mamta Ki Chhaon Mein		Appeared alongside elder brother Ashok Kumar & younger brother Kishore Kumar who also produced & directed it.
1991	Maut Ki Sazaa		
1992	Dushman Zamana	Security guard	
1993	Aasoo Bane Angaarey		
1995	Rock Dancer	Hotel Manager	
1995	Sajan Ka Dard	Lodge Manager	

=== Bengali films ===
Year	Film	Role	Notes
1958	Lukochuri		Appeared alongside younger brother & lead actor Kishore Kumar who also co-produced it.

=== Television ===
Year	Film	Role	Notes
1986-1987	Dada Dadi Ki Kahaniyan		
1989	Bheem Bhawani	Bhawani	Appeared alongside elder brother Ashok Kumar.
1996	Ek Raja Ek Rani	Shopkeeper	Guest appearance
