= Apne Rang Hazaar =

1975 film

- Movie Poster
- अपने रंग हजार
- Directed by: Ravi Tandon
- Produced by: Ravi Tandon
- Starring: Sanjeev Kumar; Leena Chandavarkar
- Music by: Laxmikant–Pyarelal
- Release date: 1975
- Country: India
- Language: Hindi

Apne Rang Hazaar is a 1975 Hindi-language film, which was directed by director Ravi Tandon. The soundtrack is composed by Laxmikant–Pyarelal and features playback singer Lata Mangeshkar and Kishore Kumar. The cast included actors like Asrani, Bindu and others.

== Cast ==
- Sanjeev Kumar as Sunil Kapoor
- Leena Chandavarkar as Malti 'Mala'
- Kamini Kaushal as Sunil's mother
- G. Asrani as Pitamber Shastri ji
- Shyama (Hindi actress) as Padma - Ram Charan's sister
- Bindu as Rita
- Danny Denzongpa as Vicky
- Helen
- Jankidas as Kailash Kapoor, Sunil's uncle
- Sudhir as Inspector Dinesh
- Satyen Kappu as Ram Charan
- Jagdish Raj as Vakil Saheb, Kailash Kapoor's lawyer
- Raj Kishore one who telephones Kamini Kaushal
- Paintal (comedian) as Nilamber
- Mac Mohan as Shekhar
- Master Tittoo as Guddu
- Ranvir Raj as Sunil's friend in party
- Gurbachan Singh as the goon who threatens Sunil in the night.

== Music ==
Lyrics written by Anjaan

Track#	Song title	Singer
1	"Meri Kali Kaluti Ke Nakhre Bade"	Kishore Kumar
2	"Ganga Me Duba Na Jamuna Me Duba"	Lata Mangeshkar
3	"Is Qadar Aap Humko Jo Tadpayenge"	Lata Mangeshkar

== Trivia ==
In the scene when Kamini Kaushal is dancing on recorded songs, the three songs are taken from film Anhonee (1973) which was also directed by Ravi Tandon, and also starring Sanjeev Kumar & Leena Chandavarkar.
