= Anhonee (1973 film) =

- Theatrical poster
- Directed by: Ravi Tandon
- Written by: Dr. Balkrishna (dialogue); K. K. Shukla (screenplay)
- Produced by: Ravi Tandon; G. M. Khwaja; Gullu Kochar; Jagdish C. Sharma
- Starring: Sanjeev Kumar; Leena Chandavarkar
- Cinematography: S. Ramachandra
- Edited by: Waman B. Bhosle; Gurudutt Shirali
- Music by: Laxmikant-Pyarelal
- Release date: 26 April 1973
- Country: India
- Language: Hindi

Anhonee ("Impossible") is a 1973 Indian Hindi-language suspense drama film directed by Ravi Tandon. It stars Sanjeev Kumar, Leena Chandavarkar, Bindu, Padma Khanna and Kamini Kaushal. Laxmikant-Pyarelal provided the music for the film.

== Plot ==
After the tragic death of her dad, Dr. Rekha continues to live with her step-mother in Bombay, where she runs a mental institution. While traveling by train one night, they are accosted by a knife-wielding escaped mental patient, Sunil, whose aggression is calmed by Rekha. She gets him admitted into her hospital where he is put under observation and treatment at the hands of Dr. Mathur and herself. He soon starts responding positively under their care, and is on his way to recovery. Once, he saves Rekha from being molested in a parking lot, and this sparks romance between the two. At first Rekha is reluctant to marry Sunil due to a secret which she cannot reveal. After great persistence from Sunil, she reveals that she killed her father by accident when he was trying to have sex with her thinking that she was her stepmother. But she still doesn't understand why didn't he stop when she shrieked out after identifying her voice; she probably thinks that as he was drunk he might have had the difficulty. It is then revealed that Sunil is not as he pretends to be; He is a well respected Police Inspector trying to find the mystery of Mr.Rai Bahadur's death. All is set for the two to get engaged at a lavish party. It is at this party that Rekha will find out that Sunil who he is and tries to get away from him.

== Cast ==
- Sanjeev Kumar as CID Inspector Sunil
- Leena Chandavarkar as Dr. Rekha
- Padma Khanna as Roopa
- Bindu as Rita
- Rehman as Inspector General
- Manmohan as Dr. Mathur
- Paintal as Dr. Tripathi
- Asrani as Gangaram
- Jankidas as Girdharilal
- Kamini Kaushal as Mrs. Rai Bahadur Singh
- Satyen Kappu as Diwan
- Mac Mohan as Peter
- Sudhir as Tiger
- M. B. Shetty as Henchman
- Anwar Hussain as Police Commissioner
- Ranveer Raj as Dr.Shukla
- Polson as Passenger in red car
- Shashi Kiran as Passenger in red car
- Anoop Kumar as Inmate
- Lalita Kumari as Mrs.Darayani

== Music ==
Laxmikant-Pyarelal composed the songs on lyrics by Verma Malik. Hungama Ho Gaya was remixed by Amit Trivedi for the film Queen.

Song	Singer
"Main To Ek Pagal, Pagal Kya Dil Behlayega"	Kishore Kumar, Asha Bhosle
"Buddhu Pad Gaya Palle"	Lata Mangeshkar
"Hungama Ho Gaya"	Asha Bhosle
"Balma Hamar"	Asha Bhosle
