= Majboor (1974 film) =

- Directed by: Ravi Tandon
- Written by: Salim-Javed
- Produced by: Premji
- Starring: Amitabh Bachchan; Parveen Babi; Pran; Farida Jalal; Sulochana Latkar; D. K. Sapru; Iftekhar; Satyen Kappu; Rehman; Mac Mohan
- Music by: Laxmikant–Pyarelal
- Distributed by: Suchitha Films Pvt. Ltd; Eros International
- Release date: 6 December 1974
- Country: India
- Language: Hindi

Majboor (transl. Compelled) is a 1974 Indian Hindi-language action thriller film directed by Ravi Tandon. Written by Salim-Javed (Salim Khan and Javed Akhtar), the film is loosely inspired by two 1970 American films – Zig Zag and Cold Sweat. It stars an ensemble cast of Amitabh Bachchan, Parveen Babi, Pran, Farida Jalal, Sulochana Latkar, D. K. Sapru, Iftekhar, Satyen Kappu, Rehman, and Mac Mohan. Salim-Javed had initially narrated the story of Majboor to Ramesh Sippy, who liked it but wanted to make a film on a larger scale, and it was Tandon who agreed to do and Sippy later made Sholay (1975) with the writer duo. The music was composed by Laxmikant-Pyarelal and the lyrics were penned by Anand Bakshi.

Majboor released on 6 December 1974, opening to positive reviews. A box office hit, the film was later remade in Telugu by director K. Raghavendra Rao as Raja (1976), in Tamil as Naan Vazhavaippen (1979) and in Malayalam as Ee Kaikalil (1986). The film was also an inspiration for the 2008 film Jimmy.

== Plot ==
Ravi Khanna (Amitabh Bachchan) is a common man working as a travel agent and living happily with his widowed mother (Sulochana Latkar), wheelchair-using sister, Renu (Farida Jalal), and younger brother, Billu (Alankar Joshi). He is also due to get married with his girlfriend, Neela (Parveen Babi), who is the only daughter of a wealthy man, Mr. Rajvansh (D. K. Sapru). One night, a wealthy client, Surendra Sinha (Rehman), visits Ravi's office to collect the air tickets that have been reserved for him. Ravi notices a large emerald ring on the finger of Surendra, who also proceeds to offer a lift in his car to him as it has been raining heavily. Later, Ravi learns from the police that Surendra was apparently kidnapped that same night, and that the kidnappers have demanded a ransom of ₹5 lakhs from Surendra's younger brother, Narendra Sinha (Satyen Kappu). Narendra has agreed to pay the ransom to save his brother, but there is no news about Surendra again. Six months later, CID Inspector Khurana (Iftekhar) and Inspector Kulkarni (Jagdish Raj) shockingly discover Surendra's dead body in a gutter and visit Ravi's office for interrogation regarding the murder. Ravi is innocent, but nervous for Khurana and Kulkarni taking a keen interest in him, since he is the last known person to have met Surendra. He believes himself to be having an alibi and seeks legal advice from his lawyer friend, Advocate P. V. Rane (Shiv Kumar), for being a simple man with a family to be taken care of, and not willing to deal with the police and the courts.

However, the stress seems to be triggering several headaches which causes Ravi intense pain for a couple of minutes. After a second episode, he takes it seriously enough to visit Dr. Shah (Sajjan) and undergoes an X-ray of his brain. The shocking diagnosis is that Ravi has a brain tumour that needs to be extracted immediately through a brain surgery, and if not, will cause his death within six months. Ravi is willing to undergo the brain surgery, but Dr. Shah states that it could either cure him completely, or could result in very unintended side-effects from blindness to mental illness to paralysis. Ravi is shattered for having many responsibilities on his mother, sister, and brother, and feels that he neither has the right to die nor become a burden on them. As a result, Ravi leaves without making a decision when the choices are death and a life worse than death. At the same time, he receives the interesting news of the grieving Narendra having declared a handsome reward of ₹5 lakhs (which he was previously ready to pay to his brother's kidnappers) to the person who will help him capture Surendra's murderer. In an attempt to better his family's financial conditions after him, Ravi comes up with a scheme to frame himself for Surendra's murder and collect the reward money for his family, justifying that he has nothing to lose himself and is going to die in six months nevertheless. He anonymously calls Khurana at the police station as an informer about Surendra's murder, who declares Ravi as the culprit and instructs the police to deposit the money at the office of his solicitor, Rane. As a result, a desperate Narendra agrees to pay out the reward after Khurana informs him about the anonymous telephone call.

Meanwhile, Ravi also sends an anonymous letter at Rane's office, instructing him to open the letter and follow its instructions only after Surendra's killer has been sentenced by the court. He also plants circumstantial evidence (his burnt shirt, cigarette butts, pieces of rope and an iron rod with his fingerprints) to prove that Ravi kidnapped Surendra, brought him to an isolated place, and then killed him with an iron rod. Acting upon the received information, Khurana and Kulkarni recover the evidence and arrest Ravi after fingerprint testing. During the trial, Ravi falsely confesses in the court that he kidnapped Surendra for the ransom of ₹5 lakhs, tied him up at the isolated place, and when Surendra tried to escape, he accidentally killed him and threw his dead body off in the gutter. As a result, Ravi is sentenced to death by the court, devastating his family, Neela and her father. Moreover, Ravi's mother and Neela's attempts to make some sense out of Ravi's confession and also request Narendra for clemency fail miserably. However, things take a drastic turn when Ravi suffers from another headache episode in prison and is rushed by Khurana and Kulkarni to the hospital, where, serendipitously, it is Dr. Shah who examines him. Aware of Ravi's medical history, Dr. Shah wastes no time in performing an emergency surgery of his brain, which miraculously ends up a successful with no side-effects. Nevertheless, it is too late now as Ravi is now a convicted criminal for kidnapping, ransom and murder, which he planted on himself.

Two months later, Ravi summons Neela and Rane for a permitted meeting at the hospital and confesses about his innocence. However, Rane states that now there is no way out and that they will need fresh evidence to reopen the case. In an attempt to save himself from execution, Ravi successfully escapes from the hospital on the mission to search for Surendra's real murderer and is aided by Neela in his pursuit. The couple escapes to a hotel to safety, where Ravi meets a wealthy man, Mahipat Rai (Madan Puri), who has a girlfriend, Madhu (Sabina), despite being married to a millionaire wife, Sulakshana (Lalita Kumari). Ravi notices that Mahipat is shockingly wearing the same ring he had noticed on Surendra's finger. On being questioned by Ravi, Mahipat reveals that the ring was sold to him by a curio shop owner, Prakash (Mac Mohan). With the help of Prakash, Ravi traces the origin of the ring to Michael D'Souza (Pran), a kind-hearted and happy-go-lucky professional thief, whom Prakash had purchased the ring from. Ravi meets Michael and confronts him over Surendra's ring, when Michael confesses of stealing the ring but claims to be the sole witness to Surendra's murder. On that rainy night, Michael had prevented the way of a car with a man driving and another man sleeping on the backseat, and had threatened the driving man at gunpoint. The driving man claimed that the sleeping man is his friend, who is sick and is being taken to the hospital by him. Since he had nothing to give, the driving man removed the ring the sleeping man was wearing and handed it over to Michael. On learning this, Ravi realises that the sleeping man was Surendra and that he was already dead, while the man driving was his murderer. In exchange for tracking down Surendra's real murderer, Ravi offers the reward of ₹5 lakhs as well as Surendra's ring to Michael.

However, Prakash advises Michael to betray Ravi and go to make a deal with Narendra, who will give him ₹5 lakhs for the information on the murderer. Michael visits Surendra's house to meet Narendra for the same, but is shocked to identify Narendra as the driver of the car, whom he had stolen Surendra's ring from. Seeing no other way out, Narendra admits that Surendra's wife, Mona (Ashoo), had an extramarital affair with him, which Surendra discovered on the rainy night and banished Narendra from the house. He also alleged that Narendra is his adopted brother, but a furious Narendra immediately retaliated by smashing glass bottles on Surendra's head, killing him instantly due to head injuries. Narendra then threw Surendra's dead body off in the gutter, faked his kidnapping and ransom, and announced the reward of ₹5 lakhs to cover up his crime. After learning this, Michael agrees to hand over Ravi to Narendra in exchange for ₹7.5 lakhs. Michael instructs both Ravi and Narendra to reach an isolated cabin at the same time, where Ravi will find Surendra's real killer, and Narendra will find Ravi. Michael is now perplexed as he is aware that Ravi never murdered Surendra, and yet he admitted to the crime in the court.

In an attempt to find out the truth about Ravi's strange actions, Michael visits Ravi's house to realise that Ravi took the blame of the murder just to provide for his family, and takes an oath that Ravi will return home to them. Later, Michael meets Narendra at the place where he had summoned him and Ravi. When Ravi and Neela arrive there, they are horrified to witness Narendra shooting three bullets in the stomach of Michael, already aware that he will expose the truth about his crime. At this point, Ravi learns that the murderer of Surendra is none other than Narendra, Surendra's own brother. He drives away desperately to bring a doctor back in time, while a gravely injured Michael holds Narendra at gunpoint along with Neela during the time. As Ravi is returning with a doctor, Kulkarni and the police discover his car and pursue Ravi to the crime scene. As Michael's health deteriorates, Narendra attempts to escape, but Ravi appears on time and captures him. Michael provides his testimony to Kulkarni about Ravi's innocence and Narendra being Surendra's killer, and eventually dies in Ravi's arms. As a result, Kulkarni and the police arrest Narendra for both Surendra and Michael's murders, and acquitt Ravi from the charge of Surendra's murder. The film ends with the funeral of Michael when his oath of reuniting Ravi with his family is recalled.

== Cast ==
- Amitabh Bachchan as Ravi Khanna
- Parveen Babi as Neela Rajvansh
- Pran as Michael D'Souza
- Farida Jalal as Renu Khanna (Ravi's sister)
- Sulochana Latkar as Mrs. Khanna (Ravi's mother)
- D. K. Sapru as Mr. Rajvansh (Neela's father)
- Iftekhar as CID Inspector Khurana
- Rehman as Surendra Sinha (murder victim)
- Satyen Kappu as Narendra Sinha (Surendra's adopted younger brother and murderer)
- Mac Mohan as Prakash (Michael's friend)
- Sajjan as Dr. Shah (Ravi's doctor)
- Madan Puri as Mahipat Rai
- Alankar Joshi as Billu Khanna (Ravi's younger brother)
- Jagdish Raj as Inspector Kulkarni (Khurana's assistant)
- Shiv Kumar as Advocate P. V. Rane (Ravi's friend)
- Sudhir as Sharma (Ravi's colleague)

=== Cameo Appearances ===
- K. N. Singh as Public Prosecutor for Ravi in court
- Murad as Judge who sentences Ravi to death in court
- Ashoo as Mona Surendra Sinha (Surendra's widow)
- Lalita Kumari as Sulakshana Mahipat Rai (Mahipat's wife)
- Sabina as Madhu (Mahipat's girlfriend)
- Anoop Kumar as Frightened Air Passenger

== Soundtrack ==
All lyrics are written by Anand Bakshi.

No.	Title	Singer(s)	Length
1.	"Aadmi Jo Kehta Hai Aadmi Jo Sunta Hai"	Kishore Kumar
2.	"Dekh Sakta Hoon Main Kuch Bhi Hote Hue" (Male Version)	Kishore Kumar
3.	"Michael Daru Peeke Danga Karta Hai"	Kishore Kumar
4.	"Roothe Rab Ko Manana Aasan Hai"	Mohammed Rafi, Asha Bhosle
5.	"Dekh Sakta Hoon Main Kuch Bhi Hote Hue" (Female Version)	Lata Mangeshkar

== Awards and nominations ==
23rd Filmfare Awards:

Nominated

- Best Supporting Actor – Pran
- Best Supporting Actress – Farida Jalal
