= Tik Tik Tik (1981 film) =

1981 Indian film by Bharathiraja

- Theatrical release poster
- Directed by: Bharathiraja
- Written by: Bharathiraja
- Dialogue by: P. Kalaimani
- Produced by: Prakash R. C.
- Starring: Kamal Haasan; Madhavi; Swapna; Radha
- Cinematography: B. Kannan
- Edited by: Kotagiri Venkateswara Rao
- Music by: Ilaiyaraaja
- Production company: Shiv Shakti Films
- Release date: 26 October 1981
- Running time: 164 minutes
- Country: India
- Language: Tamil

Tik Tik Tik is a 1981 Indian Tamil-language crime thriller film directed by Bharathiraja, starring Kamal Haasan, Madhavi, Swapna and Radha. It was released on 26 October 1981, Diwali day. The film was remade in Hindi as Karishmaa (1984), with Haasan reprising his role.

== Plot ==
Sherley is a model who returns to Madras after a modelling stint abroad. She is received by the modelling agency and is soon drugged and operated upon. Her dead body is soon found.

Dileep is a photographer working for a newspaper run by Lakshmi Narayanan. He is a photographer in a beauty pageant run by a rich industrialist, Oberoi, which was won by Sharadha, Radha and Swapna. He becomes professionally involved with Radha and Swapna while romantically involved with Sharadha. Soon Swapna's dead body turns up and he becomes the main suspect in the murder investigation and is on the run from police. As his face is plastered in wanted ads all over the city and police are watching Sharadha's house, he goes to meet Radha.

Radha, who always considered Dileep as her brother as he was always nice to her, helps him and lets him stay in her apartment. The next morning, when Dileep wakes up and turn on the tap, the water is bloody red and he hears screaming coming from the apartment water tank. He goes to investigate when a group of people are gathered around the tank and is shocked to find Radha's bloody body inside the tank. Soon people recognise him from the wanted ad and mistakenly think that he murdered Radha. He is once again on the run from police for the murders.

He starts to investigate the murders and deduce that the only thing the two girls had in common, apart from him, was the modelling agency. When he secretively meets up with Sharadha, he finds a small incision on her body. Remembering that the other two girls had the same incision, he questions her. Although she doesn't remember how she got it, she remembers that she didn't have one before she left on a photo shoot abroad for the agency. She also finds it strange that she was unconscious for a few hours during the shoot but cannot remember what happened.

They eventually find out that Oberoi, has a nefarious business through his modelling agency. He drugs the models during the photo shoot abroad, operates them and smuggles diamonds into India using their bodies. When the models return to India, they again drug the model and take it out and kill the girl.

Dileep gets captured by Oberoi's goons but with the help of his editor and his girlfriend, he has already got the truth out. Before Oberoi can kill Dileep, they hear the police siren coming towards him. Oberoi, an obsessive diamond collector, rather than get caught and go to prison, eats his own diamonds and commits suicide.

== Cast ==
- Kamal Haasan as Dileep
- Madhavi as Sharadha
- Radha as Radha
- Swapna as Swapna
- Sarika as Miss India Sherley (guest appearance)
- Shamasundar L. Asrani as Oberoi
- V. K. Ramasamy as Sharada's father
- Thengai Srinivasan as Lakshmi Narayanan
- Thiagarajan as Victor (guest appearance)
- Nisha Noor as Nisha

== Production ==
Tik Tik Tik is Radha's second film as an actress after Alaigal Oivathillai released earlier the same year. Her and Madhavi's costumes were designed by Vani Ganapathy. Manobala, then an assistant director under Bharathiraja, made a cameo appearance in the film.

== Soundtrack ==
The music was composed by Ilaiyaraaja. The song "Tham Tharikida Tharikida Thom", also known as "Poo Malarinthida", is set to the Carnatic raga Kharaharapriya.

Track listing
No.	Title	Lyrics	Singer(s)	Length
1.	"Idhu Oru Nila Kaalam"	Vairamuthu	S. Janaki, T. V. Gopalakrishnan	5:11
2.	"Netru Intha Neram"	Kannadasan	Latha Rajinikanth	4:19
3.	"Tham Tharikida Tharikida Thom"	Vairamuthu	K. J. Yesudas, Jency	4:39

== Release and reception ==
Tik Tik Tik was released on 26 October 1981, Diwali day. S. Shivakumar of Mid-Day called it "One of the worst of Barathi Rajaa's films" which "seems to be a rehash of various 'B' grade Hollywood thrillers" but noted that it "has flashes of brilliance" and applauded Haasan's performance. Nalini Sastry of Kalki wrote that although the film is shot in Hollywood style with the collaboration of camera and music, the plot which is the life force of the film is weak and lacks grip, so other special features are also dull. Saavi praised the acting of the cast, Kannan's cinematography and Bharathiraja's direction.

== Other versions ==
Despite underperforming at the box office, Tik Tik Tik was dubbed in Telugu under the same title by K. S. Rama Rao, with a shortened runtime. Though it attracted opposition from women's lib organisations for featuring the actresses in swimsuits, it became a success. The film was remade in Hindi as Karishmaa (1984), with Haasan reprising his role.
