= Rock Dancer =

- Directed by: Menon Roy
- Produced by: Shubir Mukerji
- Starring: Kamal Sadanah; Javed Jaffrey; Ronit Roy; Ritu Shivpuri; Sharon Prabhakar
- Cinematography: Ashok Rao
- Edited by: Keshav Hirani
- Music by: Bappi Lahiri
- Release date: 3 November 1995
- Running time: 140 minutes
- Country: India
- Language: Hindi

Rock Dancer is a 1995 Hindi musical thriller film directed by Memon Roy and features Kamal Sadanah, Ronit Roy, Ritu Shivpuri, Javed Jaffrey and Sharon Prabhakar as lead characters. Govinda and Samantha Fox make special appearances.

== Plot ==
A passionate Jaya wants to build a charitable hospital for the poor people. But her dance career is finished due to their enemy. Jaya's sister Ritu is eager to fulfill her task. Ritu's boyfriend Rocky helps her to make her a Rockdancer.

== Cast ==
- Kamal Sadanah as Rocky
- Ritu Shivpuri as Ritu
- Javed Jaffrey as J.J
- Ronit Roy as Rakesh
- Deb Mukherjee as Raj Malhotra / Deepak Malhotra
- Sharon Prabhakar as Jaya
- Shammi Kapoor as Dancer Master
- Govinda as Rajveer Randhawa (Special appearance)
- Samantha Fox as Dancer in song "Traffic Jam" (Special appearance)
- Mac Mohan as Mehta, the solicitor
- Anoop Kumar as Hotel Manager
- Johnny Lever as Inspector Johnny
- Paintal as Havaldar
- Jalal Agha as Waiter in the restaurant
- Sudhir as Boat Club Manager
- Baby Gazala as Pinky

== Soundtrack ==
1. "Lounda Badnaam Hua Laundiya Tere Liye" - Kavita Krishnamurthy, Bappi Lahiri
2. "Sa Re Ga Ma Pe Dha Ni" - Vijay Benedict, Alka Yagnik
3. "9 O Clock Ham Phone Karenge" - Parvati Khan, Bali Brahmbhatt
4. "Woh Thi Hum The Kasam Se" - Usha Uthup, Kumar Sanu, Anoop Kumar
5. "One Two Cha Cha" - Kumar Sanu, Sharon Prabhakar
6. "Rock Is Love" - Bappi Lahiri
7. "Traffic Jam Sorry Traffic Jam" - Bappi Lahiri
8. "You Are My Chicken Fry" - Bappi Lahiri, Shweta Shetty
9. "Zindagi Dance Hai Dance Hai Jindagi" - Reema Lahiri
10. "Ek Room Ek Light" (Dil Bole Koi Aye Aye) (CD version) - Bappi Lahiri, Alka Yagnik
11. "Ek Room Ek Light" (Dil Bole Koi Aye Aye) (Movie version) - Vijay Benedict, Alka Yagnik
