= Chalti Ka Naam Zindagi =

- Directed by: Kishore Kumar
- Starring: Ashok Kumar; Kishore Kumar; Anoop Kumar
- Music by: Kishore Kumar
- Release date: 1982
- Country: India
- Language: Hindi

Chalti Ka Naam Zindagi is a 1982 Indian Hindi-language comedy film directed by Kishore Kumar, who also composed music for the film. The film starred the Ganguly brothers: Ashok Kumar, Kishore Kumar, and Anoop Kumar; its title was inspired by their 1958 hit Chalti Ka Naam Gaadi.

According to film critic Derek Bose, the box office success of Chalti Ka Naam Zindagi marked Kishore's first hit as a leading actor in 17 years.

Anirudha Bhattacharjee of The Hindu was critical of the film, writing that Kishore Kumar's "evolution as a filmmaker reached a high point, a not-too-lofty pinnacle from where he plunged several furlongs with a film as nonsensical and nondescript as Chalti Ka Naam Zindagi (1982)."

== Cast ==
- Ashok Kumar
- Kishore Kumar
- Bhagwan Dada
- Anoop Kumar
- Pradeep Kumar
- Rita Bhaduri
- Nirupa Roy
