= Nazrana (1987 film) =

- Poster
- Directed by: Ravi Tandon
- Screenplay by: Vijay Kaul
- Story by: Gulshan Nanda
- Produced by: C.V.K. Shastry; Judah Solomon
- Starring: Rajesh Khanna; Sridevi; Smita Patil
- Cinematography: Aloke Dasgupta
- Music by: Laxmikant Pyarelal
- Release date: 27 January 1987 (India)
- Running time: 130 minutes
- Country: India
- Language: Hindi

Nazrana (lit. 'Gift') is a 1987 Indian drama film, directed by Ravi Tandon in a screenplay written by Vijay Kaul. The film stars Rajesh Khanna, Smita Patil and Sridevi in the lead roles. Shafi Inamdar, Priti Sapru and Dalip Tahil are featured in supporting roles. The film's original score was composed by Laxmikant Pyarelal. The film was released a month following Patil's death and was dedicated in her memory. The film received critical acclaim and was a box office success, grossing ₹3 crore.

== Plot ==
The story starts with a courtroom scene where Rajat Verma (Rajesh Khanna) is being accused of the murder of Sheetal Puri (Priti Sapru). At this point, Mukta (Smita Patil) steps into the witness box and recollects the whole story.

Rajat was a music director. He meets dancer Mukta and they fall in love. When Mukta's father doesn't allow her to marry Rajat they elope and have a registered marriage. Everything is hunky-dory for a few years. Then they learn that Mukta cannot bear kids.

Rajat becomes the chief music composer for a leading advertising firm. Sheetal is an up-and-coming model who will stop at nothing to reach the top and stay there. She makes advances towards Rajat, and he rejects them. Sheetal learns dance from Mukta to the tunes created by Rajat for her advertisements.

Meanwhile, Mukta and Rajat have a housemaid at their house. It is revealed that around 7 years ago, when the housemaid's husband tried to sell off their 10-year-old daughter Tulsi, Mukta intervened and decided to take care of the education expenses of Tulsi. When Tulsi returns to the village, she paints herself as dark skinned so that she can be safe from preying men. However, Tulsi is actually beautiful. When the mother falls ill Tulsi fills in for her at Rajat's house temporarily.

Rajat decides to not work with Sheetal for speaking ill of his wife and terminates her contract with his firm. This causes huge financial losses as Sheetal has become famous and almost no model is ready to step into her shoes.

However, one day, while Mukta is away, Rajat realises that he can replace Sheetal with Tulsi. Soon a portfolio of Tulsi is prepared. While returning from the launch party, Rajat's car breaks down due to heavy rains and Tulsi decides to change her dress in their house. On seeing Tulsi in his wife's saree, Rajat gets excited and sleeps with her. Next day when Mukta returns, she dismisses Tulsi as she understands what has transpired.

Sheetal, however, is unhappy and starts spreading false rumours about Rajat and herself having an affair so that she can destroy Mukta's marriage. Seeing a heavily drunk Rajat lying on the road, Sheetal brings him home and calls up Mukta to inform her that Rajat stayed with her the whole night.

Mukta is disturbed. Rajat assures her that there is no such thing going on between him and Sheetal. However, Mukta's suspicion Rajat grows stronger. Finally, Rajat too is unable to take this and calls it quits. Rajat says he is ready to sign the divorce-related papers. After that, Rajat goes downhill. He starts drinking excessively and causes headlines for all the wrong reasons.

Rajat, in utter desperation, pushes Tulsi to be the new model. Tulsi has no other option but to go along with his decision. Rajat transforms Tulsi and sure enough, Tulsi starts gaining market. Sheetal is naturally enraged by this unexpected roadblock.

The rest of the story is all about how the entry of Tulsi affects the relationship of Mukta and Rajat further.

== Cast ==
- Rajesh Khanna as Rajat Verma
- Smita Patil as Mrs. Mukta Verma
- Sridevi as Tulsi
- Shafi Inamdar as Shafi
- Priti Sapru as Sheetal Puri
- Jayshree Gadkar as Parvati
- Dalip Tahil as Banke
- Om Shivpuri as Lawyer
- Iftekhar as Lawyer
- Pinchoo Kapoor
- Abhi Bhattacharya
- Geeta Siddharth
- Chandrashekhar Dubey as Parvati's Husband
- Savita Bajaj as Sansa Dai

== Soundtrack ==
All music is composed by Laxmikant Pyarelal.

No.	Title	Singer(s)	Length
1.	"Aye Babrika Aye Reeka Reeka"	Kavita Krishnamurthy
2.	"Isse Pehle Ke Yaad Tu Aaye"	Kishore Kumar
3.	"Jhan Jhan Nanan Jhanana Jhan Payal Bole"	Lata Mangeshkar, Mohammad Aziz
4.	"Kah De Zamane Se"	Mohammad Aziz, Anuradha Paudwal
5.	"O Mera Naam Tu Puchega"	Lata Mangeshkar
