= Zindagi (1976 film) =

1976 film by Ravi Tandon

- Directed by: Ravi Tandon
- Written by: Sachin Bhowmick; Sagar Sarhadi
- Based on: Make Way for Tomorrow by Viña Delmar
- Produced by: Romu N Sippy
- Starring: Mala Sinha; Sanjeev Kumar; Vinod Mehra; Moushumi Chatterjee
- Cinematography: Anwar Siraj
- Edited by: Waman Bhosle; Gurudutt Shirali
- Music by: Rajesh Roshan
- Distributed by: Eros International
- Release date: 31 December 1976
- Country: India
- Language: Hindi

Zindagi (transl. Life) is a 1976 Hindi film produced by Romu Sippy and directed by Ravi Tandon. The film stars Mala Sinha, Sanjeev Kumar, Vinod Mehra, Moushumi Chatterjee, Aruna Irani, Deven Verma, A. K. Hangal, Padmini Kolhapure, Keshto Mukherjee and Iftekhar. The film's music is by Rajesh Roshan. The film is based on the 1937 Leo McCarey American film Make Way for Tomorrow which was also later adapted in 2003 in Hindi as Baghban.

== Plot ==
Raghu Shukla lives with his wife Sarojini, sons Naresh and Ramesh, an unmarried daughter Seema and a nephew Prabhu. Naresh is married to Sudha and Ramesh to Shobha. Seema stays in a hostel for her education. When the family learns about Raghu's retirement, they are excited about getting his retirement benefits. When Raghu informs them that he has cleared his debts with this amount and plans to depend on his sons, everyone is disappointed. Naresh informs his plans to shift to Bombay and he can accommodate his mother while Ramesh informs that he can accommodate father. Thus the parents are bound to live separately with the sons. In Bombay, Sarojini's life is confined within the house and is ill-treated. On the other hand, Raghu is dependent on his son's family. After visiting her parents, Seema decides to take an extreme step for their solace and to the surprise of her boyfriend Ajay and the Shukla family. The rest of the film shows the changes that occur in the Shukla family on account of Seema's extreme step.

== Cast ==
- Sanjeev Kumar as Raghu Shukla
- Mala Sinha as Sarojini Shukla
- Moushumi as Seema R. Shukla
- Vinod Mehra as Ajay, Seema's friend
- Anil Dhawan as Naresh R. Shukla
- Aruna Irani as Sudha N. Shukla
- Padmini Kolapuri as Guddu N. Shukla
- Rakesh Pandey as Ramesh R. Shukla
- Alka as Shobha R. Shukla
- Deven Verma as Prabhu
- A. K. Hangal as Doctor
- Leela Mishra as Doctor's wife
- Man Mohan as Manjit Verma
- Yunus Parvez as Anthony
- Brahm Bhardwaj as Sampatlal
- Vikas Anand as Man bribing Naresh
- Iftikhar as Verma
- Kesto Mukherjee as Principal 'Kalu'
- Vijay Dutt as Friendly appearance

== Soundtrack ==
Song	Singer
"Mamaji O Mamaji"	Kishore Kumar
"Hum Hasane Ko Aaye The"	Kishore Kumar
"Umar To Pyar Karne Ki"	Kishore Kumar, Lata Mangeshkar
"Main Na Bolo Na Bolo"	Lata Mangeshkar

== Awards and nominations ==
- 1978 Filmfare Awards - Nominated

- Best Actor - Sanjeev Kumar
