= Nakhuda (film) =

1981 Hindi film directed by Dilip Naik

- Directed by: Dilip Naik
- Produced by: Yash Chopra
- Starring: Raj Kiran; Kulbhushan Kharbanda; Swaroop Sampat; Madan Puri; Bharat Kapoor
- Music by: Khayyam; Nida Fazli (lyrics)
- Distributed by: Yash Raj Films
- Release date: 6 March 1981
- Country: India
- Language: Hindi

Nakhuda is a 1981 Hindi drama film, directed by Dilip Naik and produced by Yash Chopra, starring Raj Kiran, Swaroop Sampat and Madan Puri in lead roles. Music of film was by Khayyam with lyrics by Nida Fazli.

== Plot ==
Ravi Shankar lives in a shabby hotel room belonging to the owner of the Hotel "Allah Belli", Sheikhu Dada. Ravi studies in college and pays his rent and living expenses through money-orders sent to him from his dad. After Ravi's dad passes away, Sheikhu initially asks him to leave the room, but then decides to pay for the remainder of his education so as to recover all dues when Ravi gets a job. Ravi does get through successfully, and Sheikhu even arranges for a job with a wealthy businessman named Jagannath Gupta. Ravi and Jagannath's daughter, Sonia, fall in love and get married, and soon Sonia gets pregnant. Jagannath and Sonia are unhappy with Sheikhu's involvement with their family, and conspire to put an end to Ravi and Sheikhu's relationship.

== Cast ==
- Raj Kiran as Ravi Shankar
- Swaroop Sampat as Sonia Gupta
- Madan Puri as Jagannath Gupta
- Javed Khan as Nawab (waiter)
- Kulbhushan Kharbanda as Sheikhu Dada
- Mac Mohan as Anthony
- Yunus Parvez as Qawwali singer
- Jagdish Raj as Police inspector
- Asha Sachdev as Courtesan

== Music ==
1. "Tujhe Maroongi Phoolon Ki Maar Sajna" - Mahendra Kapoor, Asha Bhosle
2. "Haq Ali, Ali Maula Ali" - Nusrat Fateh Ali Khan, Mujahad Ali
3. "Suno Ik Baat Bolein, Hamein Tumse Mohabbat Hai" - Nitin Mukesh, Lata Mangeshkar
4. "Aaja Aaja Yaar Habibi" - Pamela Chopra, S K Mohan, Jagjeet Kaur, Mahendra Kapoor
5. "Sahara Hai Nakhuda Ka" - Mahendra Kapoor
6. "Tumhari Palko Ki Chilmano Me Ye Kya Chhupa Hai" - Lata Mangeshkar, Nitin Mukesh
