= Mac Mohan =

Indian actor (1938–2010)

- Born: Mohan Makijany; 24 April 1938; Karachi, Sind Province, British India (present-day Sindh, Pakistan)
- Died: 10 May 2010 (aged 72); Mumbai, Maharashtra, India
- Occupation: Actor
- Years active: 1961–2010
- Spouse: Minny Makijany (m. 1986)

Mohan Makijany (24 April 1938 – 10 May 2010), popularly known as Mac Mohan, was an Indian actor, who worked in Hindi cinema. He was known for his villainous roles in films throughout the 1970s and 1980s. He appeared in over 200 films, including Don, Karz, Satte Pe Satta, Zanjeer, Rafoo Chakkar, Shaan, Khoon Pasina, and Sholay.

== Early life and career ==
Mac Mohan was born in Karachi in British India. Mohan came to Bombay to become a cricketer, but joined theatre and became a Bollywood actor. He learned acting in the Filmalaya School of Acting in Bombay.

Mac Mohan started his Hindi film career as an assistant with director Chetan Anand, before making his debut as an actor in his film, Haqeeqat in 1964. His last appearance was in Atithi Tum Kab Jaoge in a guest appearance.

Besides Hindi movies, he also acted in Bhojpuri, Gujarati, Haryanvi, Marathi, Punjabi, Bengali and Sindhi films. He had delivered dialogue in almost all Indian languages except Odia, as well as in English, Russian and Spanish films.

He is the only actor whose real name "Mac" was used as his character name in many movies.

== Illness and death ==
In November 2009, a day before he could start the shooting for Ashwini Dheer's Atithi Tum Kab Jaoge?, Mac Mohan was admitted to the Kokilaben Dhirubhai Ambani Hospital in Andheri in Mumbai after his health deteriorated. He had a tumour in the right lung, which grew to be lung cancer and he finally succumbed on 10 May 2010, aged 72. Asian Academy of Film & Television had a special prayer meeting on 14 May at Noida Film City. There was also a prayer meeting on the same day at Ajivasan Hall for family and friends, and people from the oldest of his spot boys to Amitabh Bachchan attended the prayer meeting to pay their respects.

== Personal life ==
Mac Mohan married Minny in 1986 and they had two daughters; Manjari Makijany, Vinati Makijany and a son Vikrant Makijany. He was the maternal uncle of actress Raveena Tandon. Mac Mohan's wife Minny is an Ayurvedic Doctor. It was when Mac Mohan's father was admitted to Arogya Nidhi Hospital in Juhu that their interaction first started and later the relationship culminated into marriage. In the interview taken by professional writer Niilesh A Raje we learn that Mac Mohan had an excellent command of spoken and written English. Apart from reading newspapers at length, he loved reading Reader's Digest magazine a lot.

== Filmography ==
Year	Title	Role	Notes
1961	Junglee	Office staff	
1964	Cha Cha Cha	Sushil	(as Brij Mohan)
1964	Haqeeqat	Ram Swarup's Youngest Brother	(as Brij Mohan)
1964	Aao Pyaar Karen	Rakesh's Friend	
1966	Street Singer	Kidnapper	
1967	Shagird	Ramesh's Friend at an Engagement party	(as Mac)
1969	Aya Sawan Jhoom Ke	Madman	(as Brij Mohan)
1970	Suhana Safar	Bus Passenger	(as Brij Mohan)
1970	Abhinetri	Anjana's Fan	(as Mac)
1971	Memsaab	Victor	
1971	Man Mandir	Pinto	
1971	Duniya Kya Jaane		
1971	Balidaan	Raja's Gang Member	
1972	Yeh Gulistan Hamara		
1973	Anhonee	Henchman with knife	(as Mack Mohan)
1973	Zanjeer	Man caught in Teja's liquor warehouse	
1973	Shareef Budmaash	MacMohan	
1973	Heera Panna	Anil's Photographer	
1973	Hanste Zakhm	Braganza	
1974	Nirmaan	Mac	
1974	Manoranjan	Train passenger	
1974	Kasauti	Shyam (Ex-Writer)	
1974	Majboor	Prakash	
1974	Parinay	Narrator	
1974	Badla		
1975	Rafoo Chakkar	#4 Duo	
1975	Sholay	Sambha	
1975	Salaakhen	Prince	
1975	Prem Kahani	Anand	
1975	Himalay Se Ooncha		
1975	Dhoti Lota Aur Chowpatty		
1976	Hera Pheri	Mac	
1977	Immaan Dharam	Man offered 5000rps to give witness	
1977	Farishta Ya Qatil		
1977	Khoon Pasina		(as Mack Mohan)
1977	Chhailla Babu	Mac	
1977	Aap Ki Khatir	Mac	
1977	Vishwasghaat	Raja	
1977	Farishta Ya Qatil		
1977	Chor Sipahee	Bichoo	
1977	Ab Kya Hoga	Curator	Uncredited
1978	Ganga Ki Saugandh	Manglu	
1978	Don	Mac	
1978	Phandebaaz	Mac	
1978	Muqaddar		
1978	Chor Ho To Aisa	Alexander	
1978	Atithee	Abdullah	
1979	Inspector Eagle	Solanki	
1979	Jaani Dushman	Taxi Driver	
1979	Shaitan Mujrim	Mac	
1979	Kaala Patthar	Rana	
1979	Lahu Ke Do Rang	Mac	
1979	Hum Tere Aashiq Hain	Kaalia	
1979	Do Shikaari		
1980	The Burning Train	Mac (Laborer)	
1980	Takkar	Ranjeet's hood	
1980	Morcha		
1980	Alibaba Aur 40 Chor	Mahmud	
1980	Karz	Sir Judah's Spokesperson	
1980	Qurbani	Mac	
1980	Lahu Pukarega		
1980	Dostana	Daaga's man	
1980	Shaan	Jagmohan – Shakal's assistant	Uncredited
1980	Patthar Se Takkar	Mohan – Jagjivandas' goon	
1980	Patita	Crippled Guy	
1980	Guest House	Shakti	Uncredited
1980	Bombay 405 Miles	Mac	
1980	Beqasoor (1980 film)	Tiwari	
1980	Bambai Ka Maharaja		
1980	Sitara	Himself	
1981	Krodhi	Mac	(as Macmohan)
1981	Nakhuda	Anthony	
1981	Hum Se Badkar Kaun		
1981	Sannata	Voice of killer	Uncredited
1981	Kaalia	Voice of Flower shop owner	Uncredited
1981	Professor Pyarelal	Mac – Ronnie's associate	
1982	Haathkadi	Dheeraj	
1982	Satte Pe Satta	Ranjit's Henchman	
1982	Aamne Samne	Mac	
1982	Kache Heere	False Income Tax Officer	
1982	Suraag	Surinder Suri	
1982	Ashanti	Dhurjan	
1982	Sawaal	Mac	
1982	Dharam Kanta	Manglu	(as Mack Mohan)
1982	Pyaas		
1982	Daulat	Shekar Singh	
1983	Kalka	Chandidas	
1983	Mahaan	Mac	
1983	Karate		
1983	Haadsa	Gangster's goon	
1983	Chor Police	Flamethrowing henchman of Dr. Singh (Kader Khan)	
1984	Wanted: Dead or Alive	Nagpal	
1984	Boxer		(Guest Appearance)
1984	Baazi	Rocky's accomplice	
1984	Teri Bahon Mein		
1984	Andar Baahar	Man who took Monica out of her place	
1984	Duniya	Kabir	
1984	Jagir	Mac – bandit	
1984	Awaaz	Rustom	
1984	Karishmaa	Mac	
1984	Shapath		
1984	Captain Barry		
1985	Zamana	Balwant	
1985	Aandhi-Toofan	Balbir's man	
1985	Jawaab	Juda	
1985	Yudh	Dariyal	
1985	Zabardast	Bhima	(as Macmohan)
1985	Telephone	Mac	
1985	Haveli	Runaway prisoner	(as Mack Mohan)
1985	Bond 303	Mac	
1986	Zinda Laash		
1986	Paise Ke Peechhey		
1986	Shart	Jabbar (photographer)	
1986	Ilzaam	Dhanraj's Gang	
1986	Begaana	Lall's assistant	
1986	Allah-Rakha	Goon	
1986	Avinash	Mac	
1986	Shatru	Kanu	
1986	Palay Khan	Zulekha's father	
1986	Aaj Jhale Mukt Mi	Gypsy Dancer / Singer	
1986	The Living Corpse		
1987	Loha	Shera's Man in prison	
1987	Aag Hi Aag	Bhairav	
1987	Satyamev Jayate	Kaalia	Uncredited
1987	Khudgarz	Sudhir's man	
1987	Insaf Ki Pukar	Soloman	(as Mc. Mohan)
1987	Watan Ke Rakhwale	Mac	
1987	Jawab Hum Denge	Mac Kelkar	
1988	Yadon Ka Bazar		
1988	Sagar Sangam	Maqbool	
1988	Paap Ki Duniya		
1988	Commando	Security Officer	
1988	Soorma Bhopali		
1988	Mahaveera	Don's Chaudhry	
1988	Ganga Tere Desh Mein	Sewaram's Man	
1988	Qatil	Plain-clothes Police Officer	
1988	Mar Mitenge	Prakash	
1988	Aakhri Muqabla		
1989	Ustaad	Mac	
1989	Guru	Mac	
1989	Meri Zabaan		
1989	Asmaan Se Ooncha		
1989	Farz Ki Jung	Janga	
1989	Aakhri Baazi	Mac	
1989	Ilaaka	Mohan	
1989	Billoo Badshah	Abdul	
1989	Daata	Kundan's friend	
1989	Na-Insaafi	Gopal (Billa's Gang)	
1989	Lashkar	Raghu	
1989	Paap Ka Anth		
1989	Mohabat Ka Paigham	Malhotra	
1989	Mitti Aur Sona	Dhaga	
1989	Main Tera Dushman	Havaldar Dhaniram	
1989	Jaaydaad	Mac	(as Macmohan)
1989	Gharana		
1989	Aakhri Muqabla	Shikari	
1989	Ajeeb Ittefaq	Kamal	
1989	Paanch Paapi	Chacha	
1990	Asli Haqdaar		
1990	Ashrita		
1990	Naaka Bandi		Cameo (song "Rekha Ko Dekha")
1990	Gunahon Ka Devta		
1990	Kafan		
1990	Zimmedaaar	Man who beat up the press editor	
1990	Baap Numbri Beta Dus Numbri	Goon	
1990	Baaghi: A Rebel for Love	Kaajal's Interviewer	
1990	Awwal Number	Mani	
1991	Bhomli		
1991	Numbri Aadmi		
1991	Paap Ki Aandhi	Himself	
1991	Ajooba	Bandit	
1991	Khooni Panja	Servant Babulal	
1991	Rupaye Dus Karod		
1991	Trinetra	Mac	
1991	Jeene Ki Sazaa	Prof. Chowdhury	
1991	Ajooba Kudrat Ka		
1992	Shola Aur Shabnam	Jaichand	Uncredited
1992	Adharm	Rafiq	
1992	Sarphira	Prasad	
1992	Mr. Bond		
1992	Humlaa	Mac Bhawani's man	
1992	Khel	Police Inspector S. Kumar	
1992	Humshakal	Police Office from other city (terrorist in the theatre)	
1992	Waqt Ka Badshah		
1992	Naseebwaala	John	
1993	Zakhmi Rooh	Mac	
1993	Kundan	Mac	
1993	Gurudev	Mac	
1993	Dil Ki Baazi		
1993	Krishan Avtaar		
1993	Badi Bahen		
1993	Police Wala	Micheal	
1993	Dhartiputra	Kripal Singh's Henchman	
1993	Sainik	Private Ranjit	
1993	Aadmi	Dhar Pakad Singh's assistant	
1993	Gopalaa	Sawant	
1993	Aankhen	Tejeshwar's Henchman (Spy)	
1994	Dhuan Hi Dhuan		
1994	Dulaara	Salim Langda	
1994	Madam X	Jhaka	
1994	Insaniyat	False Jailor	
1994	Chauraha	Mac	
1994	Prem Yog		
1994	Amaanat		
1994	Zaalim		
1994	Mr. Azaad		Uncredited
1994	Pathreela Raasta		
1994	Gopalaa	Sawant	
1995	Shaan E Elaahi		
1995	Jai Vikraanta		
1995	Sarhad: The Border of Crime	Mac	(as Mac Mohan)
1995	Kalyug Ke Avtaar	Henchman	
1995	Rock Dancer	Mehta, the solicitor	
1995	7 Days		Guest Appearance
1996	Suhagraat Se Pehle		
1996	Vijeta	Fernandes	Uncredited
1996	Maahir	Murarilal	
1996	Hukumnama		
1996	Ram Aur Shyam		
1996	Apne Dam Par		
1997	Hawaskand		
1997	Mr. & Mrs. Khiladi	Police Inspector	
1997	Bhai Bhai (1997 film)	Raghu	
1998	Qatil Chandalini		
1998	Dev		
1998	Bhayaanak		
1998	Jaane Jigar	Mac	
1998	Kabhi Na Kabhi	Tatya	
1998	Maharaja	Hunter	
1998	Zulm-O-Sitam	Mac	
1998	Sar Utha Ke Jiyo		
1999	School Girl	Chopra	
1999	Sar Kati Laash		
1999	Phool Bani Phoolan		
1999	Hai Kaun Woh		
1999	Lal Baadshah	Vikram's Henchman	
1999	Chandaal Atma	Topichand Jasoos / Writer Chandi Das	
1999	Aaag Hi Aag	Tony	Uncredited
2000	Sultana Mera Naam		
2000	Shamshaan		
2000	Rahasya		
2000	Johra Bai		
2000	Haseeno Ka Mela		
2000	Geeta Mera Naam		
2000	Chehron Ke Pichhe		
2000	Jai Shakumbhari Maa	Kaal Bhairav	(as Mac.Mohan)
2000	Raat Ki Baat	Cripple	
2000	Glamour Girl	Malik	
2001	Woh Kaun Thi		
2001	Pratighaath		
2001	Phir Aayegi Woh Raat		
2001	Maut Ka Khel		
2001	Madam No 1		
2001	Gunahon Ki Devi		
2001	Dark Night		
2001	Chehra Maut Ka		
2001	Bhooton Ka Honeymoon		
2001	Qatil Haseeno Ka	Ranga	
2001	Uljhan	Himself	(as Macmohan)
2002	Jo Dar Gaya Samjho Mar Gaya		
2002	Beauty Parlour		
2002	Aadhar		
2002	500 Ka Note		
2002	Gangobai		
2002	Soch	Madhurika's Father	
2002	Maratha Battalion	Malang Baba	
2002	Aakhri Inteqam	Himself	
2003	Prem Vasna		
2003	Bad Boys		
2003	Stumped	Dukhiram	
2003	Ek Raaz Mere Dil Mein Hai		
2003	Dangerous Night	Advocate	
2003	Adorini		
2004	Ek Raat Saytan Ke Saath	Billu	
2004	Patli Kamar Lambe Baal	Madhav Saab	
2004	Ghar Grihasti	Mangesh's friend	
2005	Insan	Parvez	
2005	Pehchaan: The Face of Truth	Opposition Leader	
2006	Vidhyaarthi: The Power of Students	Inspector Gautam	
2007	Journey Bombay to Goa: Laughter Unlimited	Harley Davidson	
2007	Nirhua Rickshaw Wala	Miseerji	
2008	Hum Sey Hai Jahaan		
2009	Luck By Chance	Himself	
2010	Atithi Tum Kab Jaoge		(final film role)

=== Television ===
Year	Serial	Role	Channel	Notes
1988	Mirza Ghalib	Nawab Jaan's servant	DD National	
1993	Zee Horror Show – Dastak		Zee TV	4 Episodes
1994	Zee Horror Show – Raat		Zee TV	7 Episodes
2000	Zee Horror Show – Telephone		Zee TV	3 Episodes
2001	Ssshhhh...Koi Hai – Raakh	Zebisco	Star Plus	Episode No. 21
2002	Ssshhhh...Koi Hai – Vikraal Aur Roti Hui Tashveer	Kunwar Saheeb – Ghost	Star Plus	Episode No. 54
