= Main Balwaan =

- Poster
- Directed by: Mukul S. Anand
- Produced by: Pranlal Mehta
- Starring: Dharmendra; Mithun Chakraborty; Meenakshi Sheshadri; Suresh Oberoi; Raza Murad; Tej Sapru; Rita Bhaduri; Utpal Dutt
- Music by: Bappi Lahiri
- Release date: 28 November 1986 (India)
- Running time: 130 minutes
- Language: Hindi

Main Balwaan (lit. 'I am a macho') is a 1986 Indian Hindi-language action film directed by Mukul S. Anand. The film stars Dharmendra, Mithun Chakraborty, Meenakshi Sheshadri, Utpal Dutt, Rita Bhaduri, Suresh Oberoi and Raza Murad.

Main Balwaan was released worldwide on 28 November 1986, and received mixed reviews from critics. Commercially the film underperformed in India but did well overseas, and it was the 8th highest grossing film of 1986.

== Plot ==
An honest police officer is caught in the web of human relationships and becomes the victim of a misunderstanding by his own protector. Anil who is Meera's son marries Geeta against his father's wish. When he brings her home, his family rejects them and they are thrown out. Anil dies, due to which Geeta goes mad and their son Tony is looked after by his maternal uncle, Chowdhary who is a police officer. Tony falls in love with Natasha, daughter of Basu, the Police Commissioner. Tony takes advantage of his uncle's honesty and extracts money from local shopkeepers and businessmen. When the British crown is stolen, Tony is the main suspect.

== Cast ==
- Mithun Chakraborty as Tony
- Dharmendra as Inspector Chowdhury
- Meenakshi Sheshadri as Natasha
- Suresh Oberoi as Anil, Tony's father
- Ravi Baswani as Suleimann Dilwala
- Rakesh Bedi as Gambler
- Utpal Dutt as Police Commissioner Ajay Basu
- Rita Bhaduri as Geeta, Tony's mother
- Ram Mohan as Inspector Bulsara
- Raza Murad as Hira / Rai Bahadur
- Tej Sapru as CBI Inspector Ranjit Kapoor
- Satish Shah as Peter
- Johnny Lever

== Soundtrack ==
'Pehle Rock 'N' Roll', sung by Kishore Kumar and 'No Entry', sung by Kishore Kumar and Nazia Hassan remain popular. Lyrics by Anjaan.

#	Title	Singer(s)
1	"No Entry"	Kishore Kumar, Nazia Hassan
2	"Rock’N’Roll"	Kishore Kumar, Nazia Hassan
3	"Main Balwaan"	Mohammed Aziz
4	"Saare Shehar Mein Hai Ek Diwana"	Alisha Chinai, Bappi Lahiri
5	"Saans Teri"	Alisha Chinai, Bappi Lahiri
6	"Padosi Teri Murgi"	Alisha Chinai, Bappi Lahiri
