= Naan Vazhavaippen =

- Theatrical release poster
- Directed by: D. Yoganand
- Written by: Aaroor Dass (dialogues)
- Based on: Majboor by Salim–Javed
- Starring: Sivaji Ganesan; K. R. Vijaya; Rajinikanth
- Cinematography: M. Viswanath Rai
- Edited by: R. Vittal; T. K. Rajan
- Music by: Ilaiyaraaja
- Production company: Vallinayagam Films
- Release date: 10 August 1979
- Running time: 137 minutes
- Country: India
- Language: Tamil

Naan Vazhavaippen (pronounced [n̪aːn ʋaːɻaʋaɪppeːn] transl. I will sustain you) is a 1979 Indian Tamil-language action thriller film, directed by D. Yoganand. The film stars Sivaji Ganesan, K. R. Vijaya and Rajinikanth, while Jai Ganesh and Major Sundarrajan play supporting roles. It is a remake of the Hindi film Majboor (1974). The film was released on 10 August 1979.

== Plot ==
Ravi is a travel agent that is the sole provider for his family consisting of a widowed mother, physically disabled younger sister and younger brother. He and Neela, a promising defence attorney, are engaged to be married. Neela's brother, Ramesh is a public prosecutor who is supportive of her career and love. Ravi is questioned by the police when one of his clients, Jayaraj, is murdered. Ravi was one of the last people to see Jayaraj alive but has no useful information to assist the investigation. He does, however, have trouble remembering very basic information from a short time ago. This, in addition to his increasingly painful headaches, leads him to see the doctor. He's diagnosed with brain tumours. Ravi is eligible for an operation to remove these but is told that there may be life altering side-effects. Ravi also learns that Jayaraj's brother Ramaraj is offering a large reward for information leading to the capture of his brother's murderer.

Feeling bereft, hopeless and worried about the financial future of his family, Ravi anonymously calls in a tip naming himself the murderer. He arranges for the reward money to go to his mother using lawyer Lakshmanan as arbiter without revealing himself to anyone. Ravi is arrested by the inspector. Neela tries to defend him but Ravi sabotages his own case and is sentenced to death. While in jail, he collapses due to his tumour and is operated on. He survives with no side-effects and finally realises the true magnitude of his actions. He will be hanged for a murder he did not commit. Ravi reveals the truth to his family and friends but Neela advises him that at this point, nothing short of producing the actual murderer will help him. He sets out to find the murderer and his investigation leads him to Michael D'Souza, a robber who had robbed Jayaraj shortly before his murder. With Michael's help, Ravi unravels the mystery of Jayaraj's murder.

== Cast ==
- Sivaji Ganesan as Ravi
- K. R. Vijaya as Neela
- Rajinikanth as Michael D' Souza
- Jai Ganesh as Ramesh
- Major Sundarrajan as Ramraj
- V. K. Ramasamy as Kannapiran
- Thengai Srinivasan as Lakshmanan
- M. R. R. Vasu as Prakash
- Senthamarai as Inspector Sundar
- Poornam Viswanathan as the doctor
- Master Babloo as Ravi's brother
- Pandari Bai as Lakshmi
- C. I. D. Sakunthala
- S. N. Parvathy as Parvathy

== Soundtrack ==
The music was composed by Ilaiyaraaja. The song "Endhan Ponvanname" is set to Nadanamakriya, a janya raga that is derived from Mayamalavagowla. The song "Thirutheril Varum" is set in Mohanam raga.

Track listing
No.	Title	Lyrics	Singer(s)	Length
1.	"Thirutheril"	Kannadasan	S. P. Balasubrahmanyam, P. Susheela	3:53
2.	"Endhan Ponvanamme" (male)	Kannadasan	T. M. Soundararajan	4:03
3.	"Endhan Ponvanamme" (for Master Bablu)	Kannadasan	P. Susheela	3:03
4.	"Ennodu Paadungal"	Vaali	S. P. Balasubrahmanyam	4:17
5.	"Agayam Mele"	Vaali	K. J. Yesudas & Chorus	4:45
Total length:				20:01

== Reception ==
Kausikan of Kalki in his review wrote whatever the origin of the plot maybe, Yoganand has directed this plot briskly while praising the performances of Ganesan and Vijaya. He concluded the review saying this film would not let producers down. Anna reviewed the film positively, praising the cast performances, Ilaiyaraaja's music, the cinematography and Yoganand's direction.

== Bibliography ==
- Ramachandran, Naman (2014) [2012]. Rajinikanth: The Definitive Biography. New Delhi: Penguin Books. ISBN 978-0-14-342111-5.
- Sundararaman (2007) [2005]. Raga Chintamani: A Guide to Carnatic Ragas Through Tamil Film Music (2nd ed.). Pichhamal Chintamani. OCLC 295034757.
