= Karishmaa =

1984 film by I. V. Sasi

- Movie Poster
- Directed by: I. V. Sasi
- Screenplay by: Sachin Bhowmik
- Story by: Bharathiraja
- Based on: Tik Tik Tik (Tamil)
- Produced by: Barkha Roy
- Starring: Kamal Haasan; Reena Roy; Tina Munim; Danny Denzongpa
- Cinematography: Jayanan Vincent
- Edited by: K. Narayanan
- Music by: R. D. Burman
- Production company: Barkhaa Movies
- Release date: 7 December 1984
- Running time: 2 hours 10 min
- Country: India
- Language: Hindi

Karishmaa (lit. 'Miracle') is a 1984 Hindi language crime thriller film directed by I. V. Sasi, it stars Kamal Haasan, Reena Roy, Tina Munim, Danny Denzongpa, along with Raza Murad, Swaroop Sampat, Jagdeep, Sarika. The music was composed by R. D. Burman.

In this film Kamal Haasan plays the role of a photographer, Danny Denzongpa plays the character of a notorious criminal and Reena Roy acts as Kamal Haasan character's girlfriend.

It is a remake of Bharathiraja's Tamil film Tik Tik Tik (1981) that also starred Kamal Haasan in the same role.

== Cast ==
- Kamal Haasan as Sunny
- Reena Roy as Nisha
- Tina Munim as Radha
- Danny Denzongpa as Raja Sahib
- Swaroop Sampat as Sapna
- Jagdeep as Thakkar
- Sarika as Neeta (Guest Appearance)
- Mahesh Anand as Dev (Guest Appearance)
- Satyen Kappu as Nisha's Father
- Shammi as Nisha's Mother
- Kamal Kapoor as Singh Directorate Superintendent of Police
- Raza Murad as Anand
- Mac Mohan as Mac
- Viju Khote as Birju
- Manik Irani as Jaggu
- C. S. Dubey
- Dulari as Radha's Mother
- Kirti kumar
- Manmauji
- Sunil Dhawan as Police Inspector

== Soundtrack ==
Karishmaa

Soundtrack album by R. D. Burman Gulshan Bawra (lyrics)
- Released: 1984
- Genre: Feature film soundtrack
- Length: 28:36
- Language: Hindi
- Label: The Oriental Gramophone Record Co.

Song	Singer
"Jaan Meri Tere Liye"	Kishore Kumar
"Teri Nazar Se Meri Nazar Ka Rishta Bada Purana"	Kishore Kumar, Asha Bhosle
"Khol Doongi Dil Ka Tala, Main Hoon Woh Chaabi"	Kishore Kumar, Asha Bhosle
"Ek Haseen Gulbadan"	R. D. Burman
"Ek Haseen Lakhon Mein, Uske Lakhon Deewane"	Asha Bhosle, Kavita Krishnamurthy
