= Bond 303 =

1985 film

- Theatrical release poster
- Directed by: Ravi Tandon
- Written by: Madan Joshi (dialogues)
- Screenplay by: K. K. Shukla
- Story by: K. K. Shukla
- Produced by: B. C. Devra
- Starring: Jeetendra; Parveen Babi; Prem Chopra; Helen
- Cinematography: Rajan Kinagi
- Edited by: Waman Rao
- Music by: R. D. Burman
- Production company: B. C. Devra Films
- Release date: 19 June 1985
- Running time: 137 minutes
- Country: India
- Language: Hindi

Bond 303 is a 1985 Hindi-language spy film, produced by B.C. Devra on B.C. Devra Films and directed by Ravi Tandon. It stars Jeetendra, Parveen Babi and music composed by R. D. Burman.

== Cast ==
- Jeetendra as Ajay / Bond 303
- Parveen Babi as Kavita Verma / Suziana (Double Role)
- Prem Chopra as Shakti Verma
- Deven Verma as Aslam
- Helen as Lily
- Tom Alter as Tom
- Iftekhar as Police Commissioner Shyam Choudhary
- Satyendra Kapoor as Dr. Ranjit
- Dev Kumar as Moses
- Shreeram Lagoo as K. K. Verma
- Piloo Wadia as Mrs. Pinto, health spa owner
- Meenakshi Shirodkar as Salma
- Vikas Anand as Vikas
- Shammi as Rosy, Suziana's mom
- Yusuf Khan as Henchman Zebisko in Italy

== Soundtrack ==
In the health spa scene, the 70's disco hit 'Love to love you baby's by Donna Summer plays in the background. Gulshan Bawra wrote all the songs.

| Song | Singer |
|---|---|
| "Raste Mein Kal Ek Ladki Mili" | Kishore Kumar |
| "Dil Agar Jawan Hai, To Aadmi Jawan Hai, Zindagi Hai Uski Jis Pe Husn Meharban Hai" | Kishore Kumar, R. D. Burman |
| "Ab Jo Hoga So Hone Do, Yeh Dil Rasm-E-Jahan Na Mane" | Kishore Kumar, Asha Bhosle |
| "Main Hoon Lily, Aayi Hoon" | Asha Bhosle |
| "Main Tera Deewana, Yeh Kaise Tune Jana, Zara Meri Jaan Yeh Bata" | Amit Kumar, Suresh Wadkar, Kalyani Mitra |
