= Maati Balidan Ki =

- Directed by: Shiv Kumar
- Produced by: Shiv Kumar
- Starring: Sandhu Raj; Anu Dhawan; Rama Vij; Krishna Sharma; Surekha Rane; Shiv Kumar
- Release date: 1986
- Country: India
- Language: Hindi

Maati Balidan Ki is a 1986 film based on partiot.star cast Sandhu Raj, Anu Dhawan, Rama Vij, Krishna Sharma, Surekha Rane and Shiv Kumar. Produced & directed by Shiv Kumar. Music by Ravindra Jain.

== Cast ==
- Sandhu Raj
- Anu Dhawan
- Rama Vij
- Shiv Kumar
- Krishna Sharma
- Surekha Rane
- Ramesh Goyal
- Raghvendra Singh Solanky
- Aarti Pathak

== Music Department ==
- Anuradha Paudwal .... playback singer
- Suresh Wadkar .... playback singer
- Chandrani Mukherjee .... playback singer (as Aarti Mukherjee)
- Jaspal Singh .... playback singer
- Dilraj Kaur .... playback singer
- Hemlata .... playback singer (as Hemlata)
- Susheel Kumar.... playback singer
- Ravindra Jain .... playback singer
