= Ek Main Aur Ek Tu (1986 film) =

1986 Bollywood film directed by Ravi Tandon

- Directed by: Ravi Tandon
- Starring: Shashi Kapoor; Tanuja; Raj Tandon; Rubina Khan
- Music by: R. D. Burman
- Release date: 1986
- Running time: 138 Minute
- Country: India
- Language: Hindi

Ek Main Aur Ek Tu is a 1986 Bollywood film directed by Ravi Tandon. It stars Shashi Kapoor, Tanuja with Raj Tandon and Rubina Khan in lead roles.

== Cast ==
- Shashi Kapoor
- Tanuja
- Raj Tandon
- Rubina Khan
- Shreeram Lagoo
- Ranjeet

== Soundtrack ==
All songs were composed by R. D. Burman.

Song	Singer
"Daddy, O Bolo Sunny, Daddy, O Bolo Sunny"	Kishore Kumar, Shailendra Singh
"O Haseena Haseena"	Amit Kumar
"Jhar Jhar Behta Hai"	Asha Bhosle
"Main Deewana, Na Jana Kab Kaise Mere Dil Mein Tu"	Asha Bhosle, Mohammed Aziz
"Main Logon Se Bol Doongi, Bandh Kagaz Ko Khol Doongi"	Asha Bhosle, Mohammed Aziz
