= Vikas Anand =

Indian actor

- Born: India
- Occupation: Actor

Vikas Anand is an Indian film and television actor who works in Bollywood. He also worked as a writer and a screenwriter.

== Filmography ==
- Garm Hava (1973)
- Ek Nari Do Roop (1973)
- Joshila (1973)
- Bidaai (1974)
- Deewaar (1975)
- Prem Kahani (1975 film)
- Sholay (1975)
- Khalifa (1976)
- Hera Pheri (1976)
- Udhar Ka Sindur (1976)
- Zindagi (1976)
- Jay Vejay (1977)
- Kalabaaz (1977)
- Khoon Pasina (1977)
- Kasam Khoon Ki (1977)
- Doosra Aadmi (1977)
- Muqaddar (1978 film)
- Chor Ho To Aisa (1978)
- Nawab Sahib (1978)
- Chakravyuha (1978 film)
- Muqaddar Ka Sikandar (1978)
- Inspector Eagle (1979)
- Sarkari Mehmaan (1979)
- Noorie (1979)
- Mr. Natwarlal (1979)
- Kaala Patthar (1979)
- Beqasoor (1980 film)
- Dhan Daulat (1980)
- Do Aur Do Paanch (1980)
- Aasha (1980)
- Dostana (1980)
- Maang Bharo Sajana (1980)
- Jwalamukhi (1980)
- Commander (1981)
- Plot No. 5 (1981)
- Chor Police (1983) as Dishonest builder
- Apna Bana Lo (1983)
- Bhavna (1984)
- Mashaal (1984)
- Sharaabi (1984) as Lobo
- Sardaar (1984) as Joseph
- Arjun (1985)
- Teri Meherbaniyan (1985)
- Adhikar (1986)
- Pyaar Karke Dekho (1987)
- Loha (1987)
- Insaniyat Ke Dushman (1987) as Dr. Malhotra
- Mard Ki Zabaan (1987)
- Dariya Dil (1988)
- Hatya (1988)
- Do Qaidi (1989)
- Bhrashtachar (1989)
- Jung Baaz (1989) as Judge
- Kroadh (1990) – Story and screenplay
- Majboor (1990)
- Khuda Gawah
- Khiladi
- Bol Radha Bol
- Phaansi Ke Baad
- Jeevan Daata
- Police Aur Mujrim
- Deewaar
- Bekhudi
- Jawab Hum Denge
- Police Officer
- Kala Bazaar (1989)
- Khatra (1991) as Police Commissioner
- Tirangaa (1993)
- Aankhen (1993)
- Parampara (1993)
- Prateeksha (1993)
- 15th August (1993) as Maakhan Chaudhary
- Krantiveer (1994)
- Aag (1994)
- Andaz (1994)
- Raja Babu (1994)
- Chhoti Bahoo (1994)
- Jai Kishen (1994)
- Khuddar (1994)
- Chauraha (1994)
- Vijaypath (1994)
- Zakhmi Sipahi (1995)
- Kismat (1995) as Anti-Corruption Bureau Official
- Coolie No.1 (1995)
- Jung (1996 film) (1996)
- Megha (1996) as Megha's (Karishma Kapoor) uncle
- Loafer (1996) as Headmaster Mathur
- Zordaar (1996) as Rana
- Lohpurush (1999) as C.B.I. Director Vikas Malhotra
- Maa Kasam (1999) as Police Commissioner Mohan Saxena
- Hum Tumhare Hain Sanam (2002)
- Jimmy (2008)
- Khuda Kasam (2010) as Defence Lawyer

=== Television ===
- Adaalat as Chief Minister
- Stone Boy
- Buniyaad as Harsharandas
- Hitler Didi (2011) as Judge (Special appearance)
