= Awaaz =

1984 Hindi action crime film

- Promotional Poster
- Directed by: Shakti Samanta
- Produced by: Shakti Samanta
- Starring: Rajesh Khanna; Jaya Prada; Rakesh Roshan; Amrish Puri; Suresh Oberoi; Madan Puri; Prem Chopra
- Cinematography: Alokedas Gupta
- Edited by: Bijoy Chowdhary
- Music by: R D Burman; Anand Bakshi (Lyrics)
- Release date: 2 November 1984
- Country: India
- Language: Hindi

Awaaz (transl. Voice) is a 1984 Hindi action crime film directed by Shakti Samanta with Rajesh Khanna in the lead role and supported by Jaya Prada, Rakesh Roshan, Suresh Oberoi, Supriya Pathak, Iftekar, Prem Chopra, Madan Puri and Amrish Puri. The music is by R. D. Burman. The songs are sung by Kishore Kumar and by Asha Bhonsle. This film marked the first return of the Shakti-Rajesh team after Anurodh in 1977.

== Plot ==
Advocate Jayant (Rajesh Khanna), a criminal lawyer, believes that a lawyer's duty is to do service to his client alone and to bail him out of his trouble, even if the client is a criminal. Amit is a police inspector who brings many of the goons that are part of a gang of smugglers led by Mulchand Malhotra to court. Jayant makes use of loopholes in the law and the goons are let off. Amit wants Jayant to be more responsible when defending criminals who are repeat offenders. Amit is killed and his brother Vijay joins the police force. Priya, Jayant's sister, falls in love with Vijay and they decide to get married. One day, while going on a picnic, Anu (Jayant's wife) and Priya get into trouble as their car tire gets punctured. A drunkard who happens to be Mulchand's son rapes Anu and injures Priya. Anu commits suicide. Jayant finds out that Amit's death was not accidental and that Anu's rapist is part of Mulchand's gang. Jayant tries enlisting the help of his clients to find the real culprits, but realises that they are not responsive. Jayant vows to find the assailants.

Jayant's daughter Nandita is kidnapped. The kidnappers demand that Jayant represent Mulchand's son in a criminal case. Jayant gets him out on bail, not knowing that he is the one who had raped his wife. When he finds out, Jayant can do nothing, since his daughter is still under the control of the kidnappers. The rest of the story tells how he single-handedly brings them to justice.

== Reception ==
Awaaz was well appreciated by audience and critics alike. It received three stars in the Bollywood guide Collections. It also became a box-office hit.

== Cast ==
- Rajesh Khanna as Advocate Jayant
- Jaya Prada as Anu
- Rakesh Roshan as Police Inspector Vijay Gupta
- Suresh Oberoi as IPS Inspector Amit Gupta
- Amrish Puri as Mulchand Malhotra
- Prem Chopra as Gagan Bihari Lal
- Madan Puri as Mirchandani
- Supriya Pathak Priya
- Mac Mohan as Rustam
- Sudhir as Symond Perreira
- Beena Banerjee as Beena Gupta
- Monty Nath as Suresh Malhotra
- Iftekhar as Police Commissioner Shyamlal Verma
- Manik Irani as Gurunath
- Anirudh Agarwal as Changezi
- Amarnath Mukherjee as Judge

== Music ==
Lyrics: Anand Bakshi

- "Aa Jaaneman Aaj Tujhe" – Kishore Kumar
- "Zindagi Sau Baras Ki (Male)" – Kishore Kumar
- "Zindagi Sau Baras Ki (Duet)" – Kishore Kumar, Asha Bhosle
- "Bolo Pyar Karogi" – Kishore Kumar, Asha Bhosle
- "Ankhon Ki Zuban Ne" – Kishore Kumar, Asha Bhosle
- "Zindagi Awaaz Deti Hai" – Asha Bhosle
- Theme Music – Manohari Singh
