= Aan Aur Shaan =

1984 film by Ravi Tandon

- Poster
- Directed by: Ravi Tandon
- Starring: Shammi Kapoor; Rishi Kapoor; Moushumi Chatterjee
- Music by: R. D. Burman
- Release date: 1984
- Country: India
- Language: Hindi

Aan Aur Shaan is a 1984 Hindi film directed by Ravi Tandon, starring Rishi Kapoor and Moushumi Chatterjee. The music was composed by R. D. Burman.

== Cast ==
- Shammi Kapoor – Bade Thakur
- Rishi Kapoor – Vijay Singh
- Moushumi Chatterjee – Radha
- Dara Singh – Majle Thakur
- Ravindra Kapoor – Chhote Thakur
- Nirupa Roy – Kaushalya
- Farida Jalal – Nun
- Jeevan (Hindi actor) – Sitaram
- Ranjeet – Shibu
- Jankidas Mehra – Sharmaji
- Satyen Kappu – Ram Singh (Guest Appearance)
- Aruna Irani – Kamal (Guest Appearance)
- Harish Magon – Albert

== Soundtrack ==
Song	Singer
"Haseenon Ki Yeh Sham Hai"	Kishore Kumar
"Shehri Babu Hai Mera Yaar, Chitthi Ke Badle Bheja"	Kishore Kumar, Asha Bhosle
"Diya Humne Dil Tumko"	Lata Mangeshkar
"Ganga Ban Jaun Kaho, Jamuna Ban Jaun Mere Raja"	Mohammed Rafi, Asha Bhosle
