= Inspector Eagle =

1979 Hindi film

Inspector Eagle is a Hindi-language action drama film directed by Vishwamitter Adil and produced by Laxminarayan Khanna. The film was released on 9 February 1979 under the banner of Navprabhat Pictures.

== Cast ==
- Sanjeev Kumar as Inspector Eagle
- Neelam Mehra as Shilpi
- Bindu as Ruhi
- Goga Kapoor as Goga
- A.K. Hangal as Anthony Pinto
- Yunus Parvez as Police Constable Naik
- Ranjeet as Rakesh
- Mac Mohan as Solanki, Guitarwala
- Paintal
- Shivraj as John Chacha
