= Rahi Badal Gaye =

1985 Hindi Film

- Poster
- Directed by: Ravi Tandon
- Screenplay by: Humayun Mirza
- Story by: Humayun Mirza
- Produced by: Ravi Malhotra
- Starring: Rishi Kapoor; Shabana Azmi; Padmini Kolhapure
- Cinematography: M. R. Vasudev
- Edited by: Waman Bhonsle; Gurudutt Shirali
- Music by: R. D. Burman
- Release date: 5 April 1985
- Country: India
- Language: Hindi

Rahi Badal Gaye is a 1985 Hindi Romantic Drama film, produced by Ravi Malhotra under the R. M. Films banner and directed by Ravi Tandon. It stars Rishi Kapoor, Shabana Azmi, Padmini Kolhapure, Suresh Oberoi, and Shakti Kapoor. The music was composed by R. D. Burman.

Rishi Kapoor had to endure 7 slaps from Padmini Kolhapure in a scene in Prem Rog where it was required to slap the character. He jokinging said that he would take revenge when if situation was reversed. Rahi Badal Gaye presented that opportunity but he finished the scene without payback.

== Plot ==
Amar lives in picturesque Kashmir in Northern India, and makes his living working as a guide for tourist together with his friend, Aziz. Amar is in love with a young woman, Bhavna, who works in a hotel as a receptionist, but is afraid to tell her. He does so with the help of Bhavna's sister, Sangeeta, and finds out to his delight that Bhavna also loves him. Before they could decide on any marriage plans, Sangeeta befriends a young man by the name of Vikram alias Vicky Mehra, who is an alcoholic and a womanizer. Amar manages to convince Sangeeta not to have to do anything with Vicky, after a violent confrontation. Shortly thereafter, Amar meets with an accident by falling down a mountain, leaving Bhavna devastated and depressed to an extent that she loses her mind altogether. Then a look-alike of Amar in the shape and form of Flight Lieutenant Pavan Kumar Saxena comes to Kashmir for a visit, and is immediately mistaken for Amar. Dr. Mehra, who is treating Bhavna, asks Pavan for his assistance to meet Bhavna and pose as Amar, but Pavan refuses. Sangeeta decides to seduce him in order to get him to change his mind, and she succeeds. Pavan meets Bhavna and she starts to recover slowly. It is then she finds out that Pavan is really in love with Sangeeta; and tries to prove to the police and the community that Amar's death was a homicide and not an accident. But will anyone believe someone who has lost her mind?

== Cast ==
- Rishi Kapoor as Amar Lal / Flight Lieutenant Pawan Kumar Saxena (Double Role)
- Shabana Azmi as Bhavna
- Padmini Kolhapure as Sangeeta
- Suresh Oberoi as Dr. Mehra
- Shakti Kapoor as Vikram Mehra "Vicky"
- Rajendranath as Raghunathan
- Ashalata Wabgaonkar as Ashalata
- Sunder Taneja as Police inspector

== Soundtrack ==
The film has 6 tracks which were written by Gulshan Bawra and composed by R. D. Burman.

Song	Singer
"Meri Dua Hai" (Solo)	Kishore Kumar
"Hillori Hillori"	Kishore Kumar
"Ek Baat Dil Mein Aayi Hai, Kahoon Ya Na Kahoon"	Kishore Kumar, Lata Mangeshkar
"Aasman Se Ek Sitara Is Zameen Pe Aa Gaya"	Asha Bhosle, R. D. Burman
"Chori Chori Is Tarah Se Mil Jati Hai Nazar"	Asha Bhosle, Shailendra Singh
"Meri Dua Hai Phoolon Si Tu Khile" (Duet)	Shailendra Singh, Kavita Krishnamurthy
