= Chor Ho To Aisa =

1978 film by Ravi Tandon

- Directed by: Ravi Tandon
- Starring: Shatrughan Sinha; Reena Roy
- Music by: R. D. Burman
- Distributed by: N. P. International
- Release date: 1978
- Country: India
- Language: Hindi

Chor Ho To Aisa is a 1978 Bollywood film directed by Ravi Tandon. The film stars Shatrughan Sinha, and Reena Roy.

== Plot ==
Pran Nath lives a poor life-style with his wife and young son, Sanju. On 12Dec, Sanju's birthday, the police raid his house, find stolen jewelry that belongs to his employer, he is arrested, tried in court, found guilty, and sentenced to three years in prison. On the way to the prison, there is an accident and all travelers are killed. His wife and Sanju re-locate, but Sanju is abducted by Chinaramu, and trained to be a criminal at a young age. Years later, Sanju has grown up, is now known as Shankar, has no knowledge of his parents' whereabouts, and is a career criminal. He comes to the rescue of a village belle named Champa and both fall in love. They find out that Champa's brother, Birju, is in jail, arrested for murder. Both know that Birju is not guilty, and swear to find out who the killer is. Before they could do anything, Shankar himself is arrested and held in a cell – and the charge is cold-blooded murder of a pregnant woman named Seema. Watch what happens when Champa finds out that Shankar may have been two-timing her, leaving the onus on her alone to get evidence to free Birju.

== Cast ==
- Shatrughan Sinha as Sanju / Shankar
- Reena Roy as Champa
- Pran as Prannath
- Madan Puri as Chinaramu "Ramu"
- Bindu as Seema
- Raza Murad as Birju
- Rajendra Nath as Gobar Ganesh
- Sulochana Latkar as Mrs. Prannath
- Jagdish Raj as Police Inspector
- Vikas Anand as Anil
- Anwar Hussain as Jagannath Rana "Jaggu"
- Jankidas as Shah
- Baldev Khosa as Police Inspector
- Mac Mohan as Alexander

== Soundtrack ==
Song	Singer
"Gusse Mein Tanke"	Asha Bhosle
"Piya Agar Abhi Na"	Asha Bhosle
"Masti Mein Baithke Lagao Unchi Udan, Shivji Ka Naam Leke Lala Pi Jao"	Asha Bhosle, Kishore Kumar, Hemant Kumar
"Humko Bulao Ya Na Bulao, Hum To Pahunchnewale Hai"	Asha Bhosle, Mohammed Rafi, Manna Dey
