= Shart (1986 film) =

- Directed by: Ketan Anand
- Produced by: Aroon Mahajan
- Starring: Naseeruddin Shah, Shabana Azmi, Kanwaljit Singh and Sarika
- Music by: Bappi Lahiri
- Release date: 21 February 1986
- Country: India
- Language: Hindi

Shart is a 1986 Bollywood crime thriller directed by Ketan Anand. The film stars Naseeruddin Shah, Shabana Azmi, Kanwaljit Singh, Sarika and Tom Alter.

== Plot ==
When the city is rocked by a series of brutal murders of several prostitutes and a part of a photograph is the only clue, Inspector Arjun Dutt is assigned to crack the case. He is sure the murders have been committed by Vikram alias Devendra. But there is a sting in the tale as it is revealed that both Arjun and Vikram have been close friends and vying for the same woman, Kiran.

== Cast ==
- Naseeruddin Shah as Vikram / Devendra
- Shabana Azmi as Kiran Dutt
- Kanwaljit Singh as Inspector Arjun Dutt
- Sarika as Ruhi
- Tom Alter
- Trilok Kapoor
- Mac Mohan as Jabbar (photographer)
- Dina Pathak as Jankibai
- Sonu Walia as Model

== Soundtrack ==
All songs were penned by Kaifi Azmi while "Albela Albela" was written by Amit Khanna.

#	Title	Singer(s)
1	"Tum Meri Nazar Se Dekho"	Sharon Prabhakar, Parvati Khan, Ursula
2	"Tera Mera Pehla Yaarana"	Bappi Lahiri, Shailendra Singh, S. Janaki
3	"Albela Albela"	S. Janaki
4	"Zindagi Hai, Zindagi Se Khelo" (happy)	K. J. Yesudas
5	"Zindagi Hai, Zindagi Se Khelo" (sad)	K. J. Yesudas
