= Swaroop Sampat =

Indian actress (born 1958)

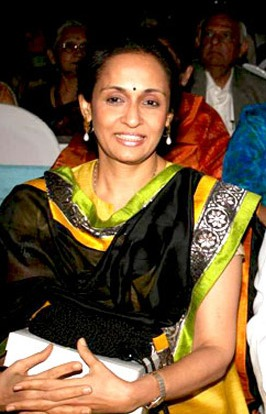
- Rawal in 2014
- Born: Swaroop Sampat; 3 November 1958 (age 67); Gujarat, Bombay State, India
- Other name: Swaroop Rawal
- Education: University of Worcester
- Occupations: Actress; model; producer
- Spouse: Paresh Rawal (m. 1987)
- Children: 2, including Aditya
- Beauty pageant titleholder
- Title: Miss India Universe 1979
- Major competitions: Miss India 1979 (Winner)

Swaroop Sampat (born 3 November 1958), also known as Swaroop Rawal, is an Indian actress and beauty pageant titleholder who has acted in several Hindi language films.

She is known for her roles in the films Naram Garam and Nakhuda (both released in 1981) and is known for her performance in television serials like Yeh Jo Hai Zindagi (1984). She started her career as a model and won the title of Femina Miss India Universe 1979 and represented India at Miss Universe 1979 pageant..

== Early life and education ==
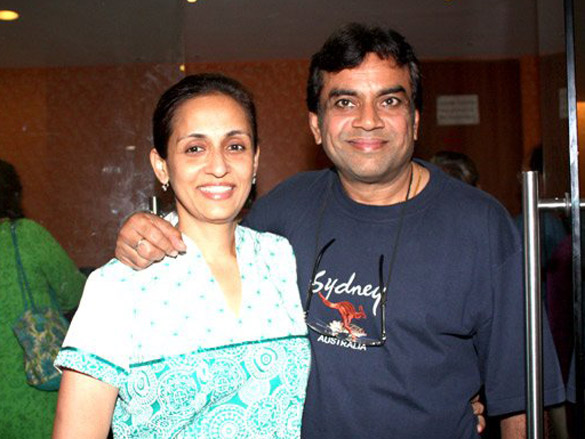
Paresh Rawal and Swaroop Sampat at the screening of the film Oye Lucky! Lucky Oye!

Swaroop was born to Bachu Sampat, an actor associated with Gujarati theatre, and Mrudula Sampat, a surgical oncologist. She belongs to a Bhatia family.

During her college days, apart from studying sciences, she would act in theatre plays, such as a Gujarati adaptation of Peter Shaffer's Equus, during which she'd eventually meet her future husband Paresh Rawal.

Years later, after becoming a mother and temporarily stopping her acting career, Swaroop obtained a PhD. in Education from the University of Worcester. She did her doctoral thesis on using drama to enhance life skills in children with learning disabilities. In 2010, she released a book on the subject, Learning Disabilities in a Nutshell: Dyslexia, Dysgraphia, Dyscalculia, Dyspraxia, which had a foreword by actor Aamir Khan, who had touched upon similar themes in his 2007 movie Taare Zameen Par.

== Acting career ==
Swaroop Sampat became successful with the popular TV comedy show Yeh Jo Hai Zindagi, where she played the role of Shafi Inamdar's wife. She had reportedly rejected another important serial on television at that time because she found the script of Yeh Jo Hai Zindagi very touching and was sure that it connected well with common people and showed their day-to-day activities and living with simplicity. It is a decision she is happy about as the serial turned out to be an all-time hit. She also appeared in the Kamal Haasan-Reena Roy starrer Karishma.

Swaroop modelled for Shringar, a kumkum company. She teaches acting to disabled children.

== Other pursuits ==
She is a trainer, travelling across India to conduct workshops for teachers to impart this knowledge for the benefit of children.

She was selected by the then Gujarat Chief Minister Narendra Modi to head an educational program for children.

She was selected as one of the top 10 Global finalists for the Global Teacher Prize conducted by Varkey Foundation, amongst 10,000 nominations from 179 countries worldwide.

== Personal life ==
Swaroop is married to actor Paresh Rawal. She directs and acts in plays starring her husband. They have two sons, Aniruddh and Aditya.

== Filmography ==
Year	Film	Role
1981	Naram Garam	Kusum
1981	Nakhuda	Sonia Gupta
1982	Sawaal	Reshmi S. Singh
1983	Himmatwala	Padma
1984	Lorie	Suman
1984	Karishma	Sapna
1985	Bahu Ki Awaaz	Kavita
1986	Karamdaata	Neeta
1986	Trikon Ka Chautha Kon	Manisha
2002	Saathiya	Shanti
2013	Saptapadii	Swati Sanghvi
2016	Ki and Ka	Mamta Sahni
2019	Uri: The Surgical Strike	Suhashini Shergill
2021	The White Tiger	The Great Socialist

== Television ==
Year	Show	Role
1984	Yeh Jo Hai Zindagi	Renu
1990	Yeh Duniyan Gazab Ki	
1990	Deviji	Sarita
1990	Biwi Toh Biwi Saala Rey Saala	Lakshmi
1990	Shanti	
1995	All the Best	
2022	Zindagi in Short	

Preceded by Alamjeet Chauhan	Miss India; 1979	Succeeded by Sangeeta Bijlani
