= Nirmaan =

- Directed by: Ravi Tandon
- Starring: Navin Nischol; Anupama
- Music by: Laxmikant–Pyarelal
- Release date: 1974
- Running time: 2 hours 13 min
- Country: India
- Language: Hindi

Nirmaan is a 1974 Bollywood drama film directed by Ravi Tandon. The film stars Navin Nischol and Anupama in lead roles.

== Cast ==
- Navin Nischol as Navin
- Anupama as Anu
- Bindu as Susheela
- Rehman as Shyamlal

== Soundtrack ==
All songs were penned by Majrooh Sultanpuri.

Song	Singer
"Kasam Khuda Ki, Jo Kuch Kahunga, Sach Sach Kahunga"	Kishore Kumar, Asha Bhosle
"Kab Tak Chhupega"	Mukesh
"Main Ek Ladki Hoon"	Lata Mangeshkar
"Tauba Tera Husn-E-Jawan Aafat Hai Jaan-E-Jaan"	Asha Bhosle, Shailendra Singh
