= Ravi Tandon =

Indian film director and producer (1935–2022)

- Born: 17 February 1935; Agra, United Provinces, British India
- Died: 11 February 2022 (aged 86); Mumbai, Maharashtra, India
- Occupations: Film director Film producer
- Years active: 1960–1987
- Children: 2, including Raveena Tandon
- Relatives: Rakhee Tandon (daughter-in-law)

Ravi Tandon (17 February 1935 – 11 February 2022) was an Indian film director and producer. He also worked as an assistant director and story writer. He was the father of actress Raveena Tandon.

Ravi Tandon directed a number of hit movies, the most popular among these are Khel Khel Mein, Anhonee, Nazrana, Majboor, Khud-daar, Zindagi. Ravi Tandon was born in a Punjabi family in Agra. Tandon and his wife Veena had a son Rajeev, a producer and director who made the television series Heena, and a daughter, film actress Raveena Tandon. His 22nd directorial venture Nazrana with Rajesh Khanna in the lead was the 5th highest grosser of the year in 1987. He died of respiratory failure at his residence in Mumbai on 11 February 2022, at the age of 86. He had pulmonary fibrosis in the last few years of his life.

== Filmography ==
Year	Film	Notes
As Director
1987	Nazrana	
1986	Ek Main Aur Ek Tu	
1986	Albela	Unreleased
1985	Jawaab	
1985	Rahi Badal Gaye	
1985	Bond 303	
1984	Aan Aur Shaan	
1982	Khud-Daar	
1981	Waqt Ki Deewar	
1979	Jhoota Kahin Ka	
1978	Chor Ho To Aisa	
1978	Muqaddar	
1976	Zindagi	
1975	Apne Rang Hazaar	
1975	Khel Khel Mein	
1974	Majboor	
1974	Nirmaan	
1973	Anhonee	
As Producer
1986	Ek Main Aur Ek Tu	
1975	Apne Rang Hazaar	
1973	Anhonee	
As Assistant Director
1963	Yeh Rastey Hain Pyar Ke	Chief Assistant Director
1960	Love in Simla	Assistant
As Writer
1973	Anhonee	Story
As Actor
1960	Love in Simla	
