= List of roles and awards of Shashi Kapoor =

Shashi Kapoor filmography

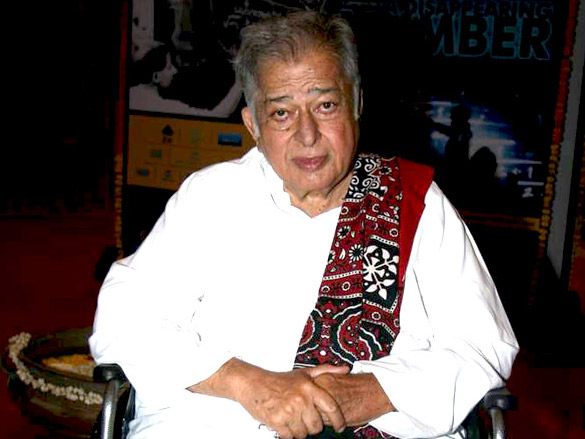
Kapoor in August 2010

Shashi Kapoor was an Indian actor, film director, film producer and assistant director. He acted in Hindi and English films as the lead hero. He starred in over 150 films. He is the recipient of the Dadasaheb Phalke Award, three National Film Awards, and two Filmfare Awards.

== Filmography ==
=== As an actor ===
Year	Title	Role	Notes
1948	Aag	Young Kewal Khanna	Child artist
1950	Sangram	Young Kumar	Child artist
1951	Awaara	Young Raj	Child artist
1953	Daana Paani	Master Shashiraj	Child artist
1961	Char Diwari	Sunil	
1961	Dharmputra	Dilip Rai	
1962	Prem Patra	Arun Kumar Mathur	
1962	Mehndi Lagi Mere Haath	Deepak	
1963	The Householder	Prem Sagar	English film
1963	Yeh Dil Kisko Doon	Anand / Raja	
1963	Jab Se Tumhen Dekha Hai	Qawwali singer	Guest appearance
1963	Holiday in Bombay	Nath	
1964	Benazir	Anwar	
1965	Shakespeare Wallah	Sanju	English film
1965	Waqt	Vijay Prasanta	
1965	Jab Jab Phool Khile	Raja (Rajkumar)	
1965	Mohabbat Isko Kahete Hain	Vijay	
1966	Pyar Kiye Jaa	Ashok Verma	
1966	Neend Hamari Khwab Tumhare	Anwar	
1966	Biradari	Rajan	
1967	Dil Ne Pukara	Dr. Prakash	
1967	Pretty Polly	Amaz Hudeen	English film
1967	Aamne Samne	Deepak / Gopal	
1968	Haseena Maan Jayegi	Rakesh / Kamal (Note: Kapoor played two characters.)	
1968	Kanyadaan	Amar Kumar	
1968	Juaari	Rakesh	
1969	Raja Saab	Raju	
1969	Pyar Ka Mausam	Sunder / Sunil / Pyarelal	
1969	Jahan Pyar Mile	Vrajendra / Kaleem / Richard	
1969	Ek Shrimaan Ek Shrimati	Preetam	
1970	Suhana Safar	Sunil	
1970	Rootha Na Karo	Sudhir	
1970	Abhinetri	Shekhar	
1970	My Love	Raj Kumar	
1970	Bombay Talkie	Vikram	English film
1971	Sharmeelee	Ajit Kapoor	
1971	Patanga	Shyam	
1972	Chori Chori	Himself	Guest appearance
1972	Siddhartha	Siddhartha	English film
1972	Jaanwar Aur Insaan	Shekhar	
1973	Aa Gale Lag Jaa	Prem	
1973	Naina	Ravi	
1974	Chor Machaye Shor	Vijay Sharma	
1974	Paap Aur Punya	Ganga Singh / Jwala Singh	
1974	Roti Kapda Aur Makaan	Mohan Babu	
1974	Vachan	Tilak	
1974	Mr. Romeo	Ramesh Saxena	
1974	Jeevan Sangram	Arjun	
1974	Insaaniyat	Dilip	
1975	Anari	Raj	
1975	Deewaar	Sub Inspector Ravi Verma	Filmfare Award for Best Supporting Actor
1975	Prem Kahani	SP Dheeraj Kumar	
1975	Chori Mera Kaam	Bholanath (Bhola)	
1975	Salaakhen	Raju / Chander	
1976	Kabhi Kabhie	Vijay Khanna	Nominated – Filmfare Award for Best Supporting Actor
1976	Shankar Dada	Inspector Ram Singh / Shankar Singh (Shankar Dada)	
1976	Fakira	Vijay (Fakira)	
1976	Naach Uthe Sansaar	Karmu	
1976	Koi Jeeta Koi Haara	Ajit	
1976	Deewaangee	Shekhar	
1976	Aap Beati	Ranjit	
1977	Immaan Dharam	Mohan Kumar Saxena	
1977	Hira Aur Patthar	Shankar	
1977	Mukti	Kailash Sharma	
1977	Doosra Aadmi	Shashi Saigal	Cameo
1977	Farishta Ya Qatil	Nitin	
1977	Chor Sipahee	CBI Inspector Shankar	
1977	Chakkar Pe Chakkar	Ravi Kumar	
1978	Rahu Ketu	Ravi Kapoor	
1978	Phaansi	Raju	
1978	Satyam Shivam Sundaram	Rajiv	
1978	Trishul	Shekhar Gupta	
1978	Do Musafir	Raju / Vicky	
1978	Trishna	Vinod	
1978	Apna Khoon	Ram Verma	
1978	Muqaddar	Ramu Dada	
1978	Heeralaal Pannalaal	Heeralaal	
1978	Atithee	Anand	
1978	Amar Shakti	Chhota Kumar / Amar Singh	
1978	Aahuti	Laxman Prasad	
1979	Gautam Govinda	Inspector Gautam	
1979	Junoon	Javed Khan	
1979	Duniya Meri Jeb Mein	Karan Khanna	
1979	Kaala Patthar	Ravi Malhotra	
1979	Ahsaas	Anil Sahni	
1979	Suhaag	Kishan Kapoor	Also playback singer for the song "Main To Beghar Hoon"
1980	Jise Tu Kabool Kar Le	N/A	Unreleased
1980	Kali Ghata	Prem	
1980	Do Aur Do Paanch	Sunil / Laxman	
1980	Neeyat	Vijay	
1980	Ek Do Teen Chaar	N/A	Unreleased
1980	Shaan	Ravi Kumar	
1980	Swayamvar	Laxman	
1980	Kala Pani	Dharamveer	
1980	Ganga Aur Suraj	Suraj / Vijay	
1981	Pyar To Hona Hi Tha	N/A	Unreleased
1981	Kranti	Shakti	
1981	Krodhi	CBI Officer Kumar Sahni	
1981	Kalyug	Karan Singh	
1981	Silsila	Sqn. Ldr. Shekhar Malhotra	
1981	Baseraa	Balraj Kohli	
1981	Ek Aur Ek Gyaarah	Anand	
1981	Maan Gaye Ustaad	Kishan / Prince Daulat Singh	
1982	Do Guru	N/A	Unreleased
1982	Vakil Babu	Shekhar	
1982	Vijeta	Nihal Singh	
1982	Namak Halaal	Raja Singh	
1982	Sawaal	Inspector Ravi Malhotra	
1982	Bezubaan	Kumar	
1983	Heat and Dust	The Nawab	English film
1983	Gehri Chot - Urf: Durdesh	Arun Khanna / Harun Khan	
1983	Ghungroo	Senapati Vikram Singh	
1983	Bandhan Kuchchey Dhaagon Ka	Prem Kapoor	
1984	Pakhandi	Kishore	
1984	Ghar Ek Mandir	Prem	
1984	Zameen Aasmaan	Dr. Kailash	Cameo
1984	Utsav	Samsthanak	
1985	Pighalta Aasman	Suraj Arora / Prakash Arora	
1985	Aandhi-Toofan	Inspector Ranjit Singh	
1985	Bepanaah	Ravi Malhotra	
1985	Alag Alag	Dr. Rana	
1985	Bhavani Junction	Raja Bhavani Pratap	
1986	Ilzaam	Police Commissioner Ranjit Singh	
1986	Swati	Dr. Rajendra Prasad	
1986	Maa Beti	Dhanraj	
1986	New Delhi Times	Vikas Pande	National Award for Best Actor
1986	Ek Main Aur Ek Tu	Satyendranath Malhotra	
1986	Aurat	Himself	Guest appearance
1987	Ghar Ka Sukh	Himself	Guest appearance
1987	Anjaam	Thakur	Guest appearance
1987	Ijaazat	Sudha's Husband	Cameo
1987	Sindoor	Professor Vijay Choudhury	
1987	Sammy and Rosie Get Laid	Rafi Rahman	English film
1987	Pyar Ki Jeet	Dr. Rehman	
1987	Naam O Nishan	Inspector Sangram Singh	
1988	Commando	IGP	
1988	Hum To Chale Pardes	Kumar	
1988	The Deceivers	Chandra Singh	English film
1989	Meri Zabaan	Raja Vijay Singh	
1989	Farz Ki Jung	Vikram	
1989	Gair Kaanooni	Police Commissioner Kapil Khanna	
1989	Clerk	Vijay Kapoor	
1989	Touhean	Dr. Rizvi	
1989	Oonch Neech Beech	Motilal	Delayed release
1989	Jaaydaad	Advocate Malhotra	
1991	Akayla	Police Commissioner	
1991	Raiszaada	DSP Amar Singh	
1994	In Custody	Nur	
1998	Jinnah	Narrator	English film
1998	Swami Vivekananda	Rajasthani Husband	Cameo
1998	Side Streets	Vikram Raj	English film
1998	Ghar Bazar	Amar	Delayed release

=== Producer ===
- Junoon (1979)
- Kalyug (1981)
- 36 Chowringhee Lane (1981)
- Vijeta (1982)
- Utsav (1984)
- Ajooba (1991)

=== Assistant director ===
- Post Box 999 (1958)
- Guest House (1959)
- Shriman Satyawadi (1960)
- Dulha Dulhan (1964)
- Manoranjan (1974)

=== Director ===
- Vozvrashcheniye Bagdadskogo Vora (1988)
- Ajooba (1991)

== Awards ==
=== Civilian awards ===
- 2011 – Padma Bhushan by the Government of India

=== National Film Awards ===
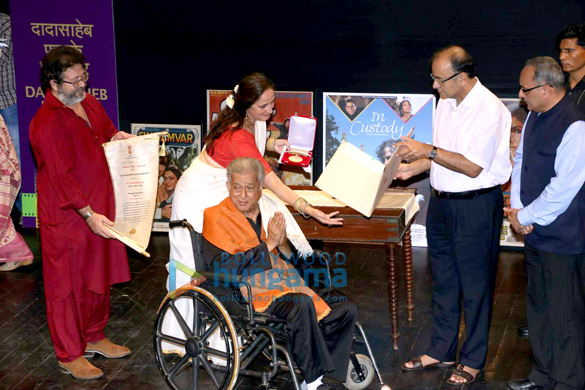
Shashi Kapoor with son Kunal Kapoor and daughter Sanjana Kapoor receiving Dadasaheb Phalke Award from Union Minister Arun Jaitley in May 2015

- 2015 – Dadasaheb Phalke Award

Winner

- 1979 – Best Feature Film in Hindi (as Producer) for Junoon (1978)
- 1986 – Best Actor for New Delhi Times (1986)
- 1994 – Special Jury Award / Special Mention (Feature Film) for In Custody (1993)

=== Filmfare Awards ===
- 1976 – Best Supporting Actor for Deewaar
- 2010 – Lifetime Achievement Award

=== Bengal Film Journalists' Association Awards ===
- BFJA Award for Best Actor (Hindi)
  1965 - Jab Jab Phool Khile
  1988 - New Delhi Times

=== Other awards ===
- 2011 – Mohammed Rafi Award
- Lifetime Achievement Award

- 2002 – The 27th Cairo International Film Festival
- 2009 – The 7th Pune International Film Festival (PIFF)
- 2009 – The 11th Mumbai Film Festival (MFF)
