= Kamal Barot =

Indian playback singer (born 1938)

- Born: Kamal Barot; 18 November 1938 (age 87)
- Genres: Filmi
- Occupations: Indian Playback Singer; Live Performer
- Years active: 1957–1968

Kamal Barot (born 18 November 1938) is an Indian female playback singer mainly worked in Bollywood.

== Career ==
Born on 18 November 1938 (Dar es-Salaam at Tanzania), she debuted in Bollywood in 1957 with the film Sharada. She later went on to sing 140 songs in 117 films. One of her most popular and distinctive solo was in the film, Ramu Dada, Suna hai jabse mausam hai pyaar ke kaabil. She usually sang duets with either Lata Mangeshkar, or Asha Bhosle. But she made a memorable collaboration with great Mukesh. They together have sung songs like "Chand Kaisa Hoga" from Rocket Girl (1961), "Jab se hum tum, baharon mein" from Mein Shadi Karne Chala (1962), "Hum Bhi Kho Gaye" from Madam Zorro (1964). Other songs from her vocal include "Tera Nikhra Nikhra Chehra" and "Dhadka To Hoga Dil Huzoor" from C.I.D. 909 with legends Asha Bhosle and Mahendra Kapoor, composed by maestro O. P. Nayyar. She sang some very successful female-female duets with top singers. Most popular of them is "Hansta Hua Noorani Chehra", a dance song from Parasmani (1963) and Kamal's co-singer was Lata Mangeshkar. It is believed by many to be the best song of her career at the time; it became a chartbuster with an entry to Binaca Geetmala's top 10. Some other timeless hits by her are "Daadiamma Daadiamma Maan Jao" with Asha Bhosle, composed by Ravi from Gharana (1961), "Garjat Barsat Sawan Aayo" with Suman Kalyanpur, composed by Roshan from Barsaat Ki Raat (1960). Nasihat (1967) and "Jigar mein dard kaisa....(Apna Ghar Apni Kahani AKA Pyas (1968), a duet with Mahendra Kapoor were her final renditions of the career.
