= Mohan Sherry =

Indian actor

- Sherry in Do Aur Do Paanch
- Other names: Sheri Mohan; Sherry; Sheri
- Occupation: Actor
- Years active: 1961–1988
- Children: 3

Mohan Sherry is an Indian actor of Bollywood who is known for his role as villain's henchman. His best roles are in Ram Balram, Deewaar and Trishul etc.

== Filmography ==
Year	Film	Role
1961	Elephant Queen	
1962	Tilasmi Duniya	
1963	Nine Hours to Rama	Detective
1963	Tarzan Aur Jadugar	
1964	Khush Naseeb	
1964	Khufia Mahal	Sorcerer
1964	Arab Ke Lal	
1965	Teen Sardar	Sulemaan
1965	Son of Hatimtai	
1965	Jadui Angoothi	
1965	Boxer	
1966	Spy in Goa	Sherry
1966	Shanker Khan	
1966	Insaaf	Bhupendra Kumar
1967	Raat Andheri Thi	Sona Lal
1967	Mohabbat Ki Jung	
1967	C.I.D. 909	Vasco X-117
1968	Tatar Ki Hasina	
1968	Izzat	Dukal
1968	CID Agent 302	
1968	Anjaam	Keshav
1969	Insaaf Ka Mandir	Raghu Nath Sharma
1970	Veer Ghatokach	
1970	Dagabaaz	
1970	Begunah	Mahendra Nath
1970	Mere Humsafar	
1970	Suhana Safar	Bus Driver
1970	Man Ki Aankhen	Keshav
1970	Gunah Aur Kanoon	Doctor
1971	Veer Chhatrasal	
1971	Sampoorna Devi Darshan	
1971	Gehra Raaz	Mr. Singh
1971	Hum Tum Aur Woh	Ravi
1972	Munimji	Dr. Benerjee
1973	Vishnu Puran	Kali Maa's Devotee
1973	Phir Aya Toofan	
1973	Guru Aur Chela	
1973	Alam Ara	
1973	Nirdosh	
1973	Mera Desh Mera Dharam	
1974	Sapane Suhane	
1974	Patthar Aur Payal	Khan
1975	Raftaar	
1975	Rafoo Chakkar	Duo
1975	Deewaar	Samant's Henchman
1975	Anokha	Dhanoo
1975	Ek Mahal Ho Sapno Ka	Prakash
1975	Jaan Hazir Hai	
1976	Adalat	Hotel Owner
1976	Hera Pheri	Sherry
1976	Bullet	
1976	Meera Shyam	
1976	Kasam	
1976	Do Khiladi	
1977	Wafadar	
1977	Immaan Dharam	
1977	Khoon Pasina	
1977	Chhailla Babu	Sherry
1977	Jay Vejay	Bandit Bhawani Singh
1977	Kalabaaz	
1977	Kachcha Chor	Sardar
1978	Phaansi	Jagga
1978	Trishul	Gangoo
1978	Amar Shakti	Kotwal Sher Singh
1979	Kaala Patthar	Shanker
1979	Aakhri Kasam	Durjan singh
1979	Lahu Ke Do Rang	
1980	Do Aur Do Paanch	Security guard
1980	Saboot	Public Prosecutor
1980	Unees-Bees	
1980	Chambal Ki Kasam	Badan Singh's Henchman
1980	Dostana	
1980	Ram Balram	Police Commissioner Gupta
1980	Shaan	Durjan Singh
1980	Ganga Aur Suraj	
1981	Yaarana	Mental hospital's employee
1981	Shradhanjali	Rani's husband
1981	Ghamandee	Dinoo
1982	Rajput	Diwanji
1982	Mangal Pandey	Kulbhushan
1982	Swami Dada	
1982	Khush Naseeb	
1983	Love in Goa	Marshal Lobo
1984	Pet Pyar Aur Paap	
1984	Hum Rahe Na Hum	Dr. D'Silva
1984	Shaarabi	Business Partner (Cameo Role)
1985	Zamana	
1985	Hum Naujawan	
1986	Vikram Vetal	
1986	Kala Dhanda Goray Log	
1986	Naam	Narayan
1986	Ek Aur Sikander	
1986	Angaaray	Mehta
1987	Tarzan And Cobra	
1987	Khazana	Usmaan
1987	Kaun Jeeta Kaun Haara	
1988	Main Tere Liye	
