= Kora Badan =

- Directed by: Boota Singh Shaad
- Music by: Vedpal Sharma
- Release date: 15 March 1974
- Country: India
- Language: Hindi

Kora Badan is a 1974 Indian Hindi-language drama film directed by Boota Singh Shaad.

== Cast ==
- Sunil Dutt as dacoit (Guest appearance)
- Mala Sinha as dancer (Guest appearance)
- Dev Kumar
- Paintal
- Gurcharan Pohli
- Rita Anchan

== Soundtrack ==
All songs were composed by Vedpal Sharma.

- "Jhurmut Bole" – Krishna Bose, Manhar Udhas
- "Paas Aake Baat Meri Sun" – Asha Bhosle
- "Zindagi Zindadili Ka Naam Hai" – Asha Bhosle
- "Main Dudh Ban Jaaungi" – Asha Bhosle
- "Meri Jawani Mujhko Sataye" – Hemlata
- "Ek Bechara Bachpan Tha" – Krishna Bose
