= Mellow Mud =

2016 Latvian film by Renārs Vimba

- Directed by: Renārs Vimba
- Written by: Renārs Vimba
- Produced by: Aija Bērziņa; Alise Ģelze
- Starring: Elīna Vaska; Andžejs Lilientāls; Edgars Samītis
- Cinematography: Arnar Thorisson
- Music by: Ēriks Ešenvalds
- Release date: 26 February 2016 (Latvia)
- Running time: 106 minutes
- Country: Latvia
- Language: Latvian
- Budget: 550 000 EUR

Mellow Mud (Latvian: Es esmu šeit, lit. 'I Am Here') is a 2016 Latvian drama film by director Renārs Vimba.

== Plot ==
Raja is a 17-year-old high school student living in the Latgalian countryside in Latvia with her paternal grandmother Olga and her younger, 12-year-old brother Robis (Roberts) after the death of their father and their mother going to London to work abroad. Against the wishes of the children, Olga wants to sell the homestead, but dies in a sudden accident. Raja faces a choice to either report the death and risk ending up in an orphanage together with her brother, or hide the truth and fight to keep her home and family. Raja becomes the breadwinner of the pair, while grappling with experiencing her first love.

== Cast ==
- Elīna Vaska as Raja
- Andžejs Lilientāls as Robis
- Edgars Samītis as Oskars
- Ruta Birgere as Grandmother Olga
- Zane Jančevska as Diāna

== Awards ==
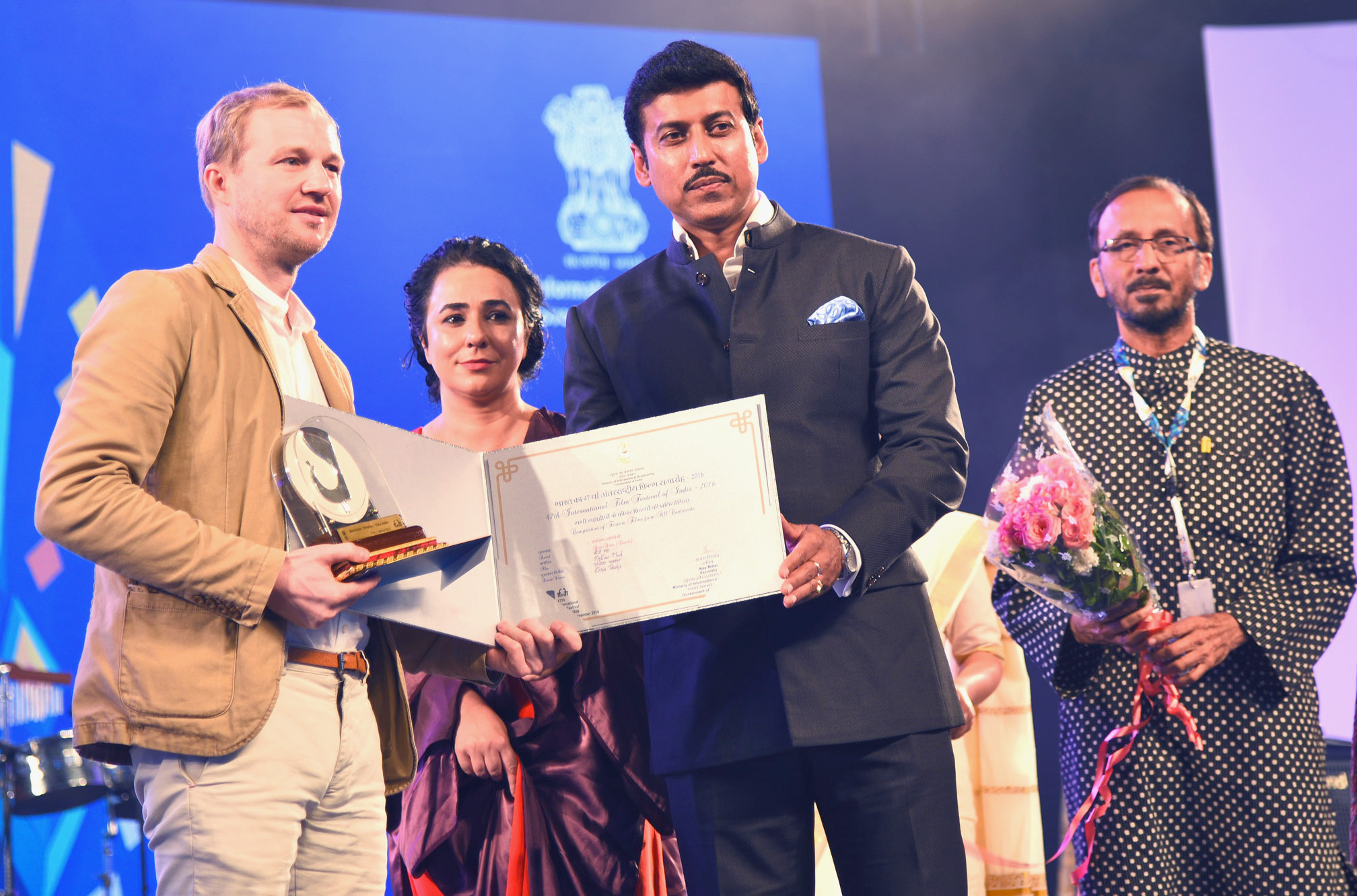
Director Renārs Vimba, at IFFI (2016)

- Berlin International Film Festival (2016) Crystal Bear Award in the Generation/14plus competition
- Latvian National Film Festival Lielais Kristaps (2016) Best Film
- Elīna Vaska received the IFFI Best Actor Award (Female): Silver Peacock Award at the 47th International Film Festival of India for her performance it the film.
