= Gunabhiram Barua =

Indian writer (1834–1894)

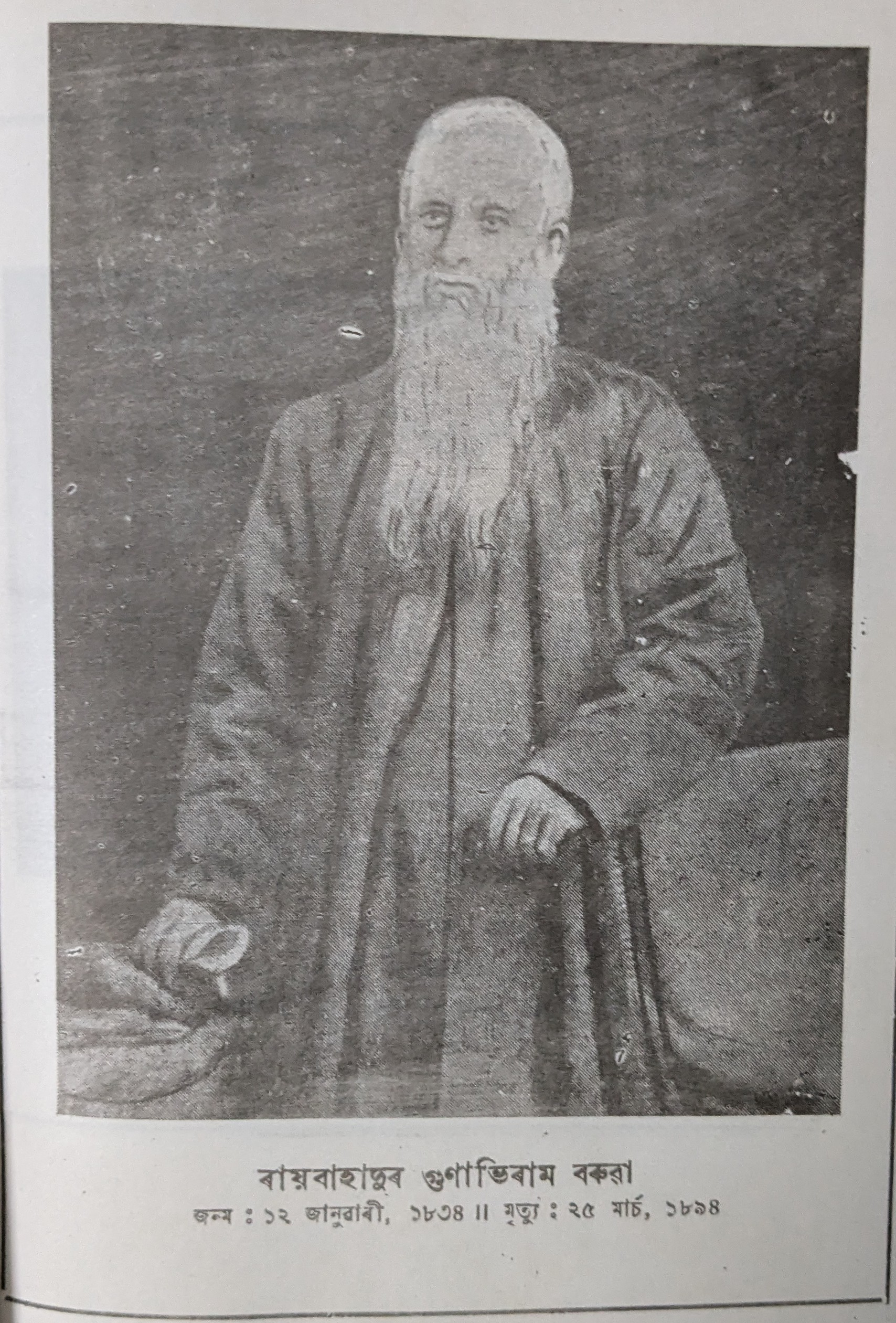
- Born: 1834; Jorhat, Bengal Presidency, British Raj
- Died: 1894 (aged 59–60); Calcutta, Bengal Presidency, British Raj
- Occupations: Dramatist, historian, essayist, social reformer
- Spouse: Bishnupriya Devi
- Children: 3, including Jnanabhiram
- Writing career
- Language: Assamese

Gunabhiram Barua (1834 – 1894) was an Indian dramatist, historian, essayist, social reformer.

== Biography ==
Barua completed his college education from Presidency College, Calcutta and became an assistant commissioner under the colonial government. He remained in the job for the next 30 years.

After his first wife's death, his 1879 marriage with a Brahman widow, Bishnupriya Devi, created a sensation in the orthodox society of Assam. Bishnupriya and their daughter Swarnalata Barua were encouraged by him to write and publish their work in magazines and newspapers.

Barua advocated the cause of women's education and took the bold step of sending his daughter Swarnalata Devi to a boarding school in Calcutta when he was working in the small town of Nagaon in Assam as an Extra Assistant Commissioner.

His son Jnanadabhiram Barua went on to become a well-known lawyer and leader of the Indian National Congress. Gunabhiram wrote a number of tracts for children, published under the heading Lara Bandhu (Friend of Boys) in Arunodoi, the first Assamese newspaper, published by American missionaries. Lara Bondhu was also named as the first children's magazine in Assamese literature edited by his son Karunabhiram Barua.

Gunabhiram Barua was a cousin of Anandaram Dhekial Phukan. Gunabhiram grew up under Anandaram's tutelage, as his parents died when he was a child.

Hindi film actor Sharmila Tagore is the granddaughter of Gunabhiram's son Jnanadabhiram on her maternal side.

== Literary works ==
The first social drama in Assamese – Ramnabami-Natak – was written by Gunabhiram in 1857 and published as a book in 1870. The play tells the tragic story of a young widow, Nabami, and her lover, Ram, both of whom were compelled to commit suicide because of social disapproval of their relationship.

Gunabhiram is also remembered as a historian and biographer. In 1887, he published an Assam Buranji, which went on to become a school textbook. He also wrote regularly on issues such as women's education and marriage reforms. Kathin Shobdor Rohasyha Bakhya is a humorous work by Barua, published posthumously in 1912.

Gunabhiram Barua published and edited the short-lived but hugely influential literary journal Assam-Bandhu(1885-1886). Famous conservative intellectuals such as Ratneshwar Mahanta and Rudraram Doloi also contributed to its pages.

== See also ==
- History of Assamese literature
- List of Asam Sahitya Sabha presidents
- List of Assamese-language poets
- List of Assamese writers with their pen names
