= C.I.D. 909 =

- Directed by: Mohammed Hussain
- Starring: Feroz Khan; Mumtaz; Helen
- Music by: O. P. Nayyar
- Distributed by: Bindoo Kalamandir
- Release date: 1967
- Country: India
- Language: Hindi

C.I.D. 909 is a 1967 Bollywood thriller film directed by Mohammad Hussain starring Feroz Khan & Mumtaz in lead roles. O. P. Nayyar has composed the music for the film.

== Plot ==
A professor has developed a unique formula that can be both- constructive and destructive- which he intends to present in an international conference for world peace. Vasco steals the formula but realizes that it is in code language and can only be decoded either by Professor or his daughter Reshma. Then a series of kidnap and chase begins.

== Cast ==
- Feroz Khan as Raju / C.I.D. 909
- Mumtaz as Reshma
- Helen as Sophia
- Bela Bose as Rosy
- Tun Tun as Julie Fernandes D'Silva Ghobewali, Reshma's governess
- Moolchand as Suraj
- MB Shetty as Shetty
- Rajan Haksar as Wong
- Brahm Bhardwaj as Professor
- Paro Devi as Paro, Professor's wife
- Mohan Sherry as Vasco/X-117
- Rajan Kapoor as Vasco's right-hand man
- Uma Dutt as CID Chief
- Ram Mohan as X-113
- Jullian as driver Vijay

== Soundtrack ==
Song	Singer
"Nadi Ka Kinara Ho"	Asha Bhosle
"Chaho To Jaan Le Lo"	Asha Bhosle
"Yaar Badshah, Yaar Dilruba"	Asha Bhosle
"Jaan-E-Tamanna Kya Kar Dala"	Asha Bhosle, Mahendra Kapoor
"Tera Nikhra Nikhra Chehra, Jis Par Chamke Roop Sunehra"	Asha Bhosle, Mahendra Kapoor, Kamal Barot
"Dhadka To Hoga Dil Zaroor, Kiya Jo Hoga Tumne Pyar"	Asha Bhosle, Mahendra Kapoor, Kamal Barot
