= Chattan Singh =

- Directed by: Kedar Kapoor
- Starring: Premnath; Vinod Mehra; Yogeeta Bali
- Music by: Kalyanji-Anandji
- Release date: 1974
- Country: India
- Language: Hindi

Chattan Singh is a 1974 Bollywood drama film directed by Kedar Kapoor. It stars Premnath in title role, along with Vinod Mehra, Yogeeta Bali, Aruna Irani in lead roles and music by Kalyanji-Anandji.

== Cast ==
- Premnath as Sher Singh / Thakur Chattan Singh
- Vinod Mehra as Vishal
- Yogeeta Bali as Rekha
- Aruna Irani as Badli Banjaran
- Raj Tilak as Inspector Dilip
- Prakash Gill as Thakur Durjan Singh
- Roopesh Kumar as Chhote Sarkar (Durjan's Son)
- Gurcharan Pohli as Daku Sant Singh
- Ajit as Thakur Parvat Singh (Guest Appearance)
- Urmila Bhatt as Laxmi Singh
- Jagdish Raj as Thanedar

== Songs ==
Lyrics: Verma Malik

1. "Balma Tu Har Waade Par Karta Hai" – Mubarak Begum
2. "Mera Chimata Bole Chhanak Chhanak Chhan" – Mukesh, Asha Bhosle
3. "Jab Koi Ladki, Jab Koi Ladki Baar Baar" – Kishore Kumar, Asha Bhosle
4. "Har Baar Samandar Ki Har Dhar" – Aziz Nazan, Usha Timothy
5. "Mai Toh Nahi Jaana Sasural" – Asha Bhosle
