= Sharmila Tagore =

Indian actress (born 1944)

- Begum Mother of Pataudi
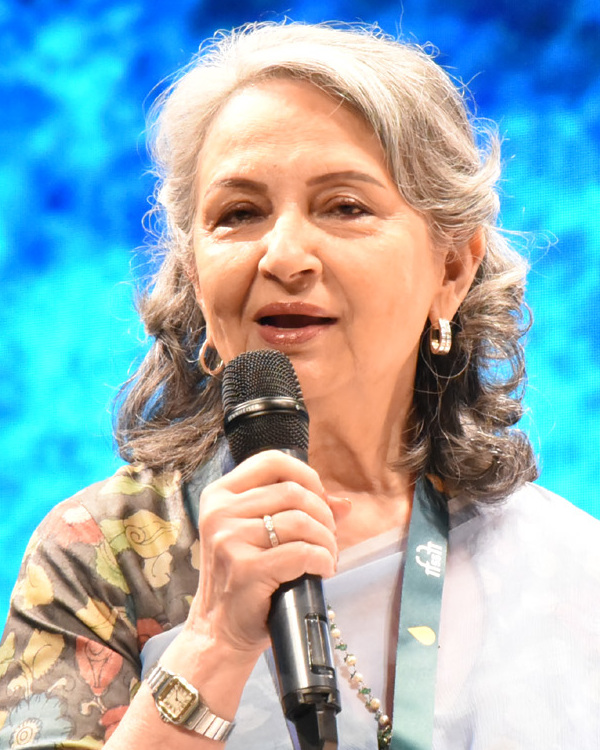
- Tagore in 2024

Begum Consort of Pataudi
- Titular: 1968–1971
- Predecessor: Sajida Sultan
- Successor: Title abolished
- Born: 8 December 1944 (age 81); Kanpur, British India
- Other name: Begum Ayesha Sultana
- Occupation: Actress
- Years active: 1959–2010; 2023–present
- Spouse: Mansoor Ali Khan Pataudi (m. 1968; died 2011)
- Children: 3 (Saif, Saba and Soha)
- Family: Tagore family; Pataudi family
- Honours: Padma Bhushan (2013)

Sharmila Tagore (Bengali: [ʃɔɾˈmila ˈʈʰakuɾ]; born 8 December 1944), also known by her married name Begum Ayesha Sultana, is an Indian actress whose career has spanned over six decades across Hindi and Bengali films. In recognition of her contributions to cinema, she was honoured with Commander of Order of Arts and Letters by Government of France in 1999, and Padma Bhushan, India's third highest civilian award, in 2013. Tagore is also a recipient of two National Film Awards and a Filmfare Award.

Born into the prominent Tagore family, one of the leading families of Calcutta and a key influence during the Bengali Renaissance, Tagore made her acting debut at age 14 with Satyajit Ray's acclaimed Bengali epic drama The World of Apu (1959). She went on to collaborate with Ray on numerous other films, including Devi (1960), Nayak (1966), Aranyer Din Ratri (1970), and Seemabaddha (1971), her other Bengali films over the time included Barnali (1963), Shes Anko (1963), Nirjan Saikate (1965), Amanush (1975), Anand Ashram (1977), and Kalankini Kankabati (1981); thus establishing herself as one of the most acclaimed actresses of Bengali cinema.

Tagore's career further expanded when she ventured into Hindi films with Shakti Samanta's romance Kashmir Ki Kali (1964). She established herself as one of the leading actresses of Hindi cinema with films like Waqt (1965), Anupama (1966), Devar (1966), An Evening in Paris (1967), Aamne Saamne (1967), Mere Hamdam Mere Dost (1968), Satyakam (1969), Aradhana (1969), Safar (1970), Amar Prem (1972), Daag (1973), Aa Gale Lag Jaa (1973), Avishkaar (1974), Chupke Chupke (1975), Mausam (1975), Ek Mahal Ho Sapno Ka (1975) and Namkeen (1982). She won the Filmfare Award for Best Actress for Aradhana and the National Film Award for Best Actress for Mausam. This was followed by intermittent film appearances in the subsequent decades, including in Sunny (1984), Swati (1986), New Delhi Times (1986), Mira Nair's Mississippi Masala (1991) and Goutam Ghose's Abar Aranye (2002), which won her the National Film Award for Best Supporting Actress, Shubho Mahurat (2003), and in the Hindi films Aashik Awara (1993), Mann (1999), Viruddh (2005), Eklavya (2007) and Break Ke Baad (2010). Following a hiatus of 13 years, she made her film comeback with the drama Gulmohar (2023) followed by a critically acclaimed performance in Puratawn (2025).

Tagore served as the chairperson of the Central Board of Film Certification from October 2004 to March 2011. In December 2005, she was chosen as a UNICEF Goodwill Ambassador.

== Early life and background ==
Sharmila Tagore was born on 8 December 1944 in Cawnpore (now Kanpur), United Provinces to Gitindranath Tagore, a general manager in the British India Corporation, and his wife Ira Tagore (née Barua). As a member of the aristocratic Bengali Hindu Tagore family, she is related to the Nobel laureate Rabindranath Tagore, actress Devika Rani and the painter Abanindranath Tagore. Her mother was of Assamese descent and hailed from the Barua family. Gitindranath was the grandson of the noted painter Gaganendranath Tagore, whose own father Gunendranath had been a first cousin of the laureate. In fact, Tagore is more closely related to Rabindranath Tagore through her mother: her maternal grandmother, Latika Barua (née Tagore), was the granddaughter of Rabindranath Tagore's brother, Dwijendranath Tagore. Her parents were fourth-cousins. Tagore's maternal grandfather (husband of Latika Barua née Tagore) was Jnanadabhiram Barua, an Assamese Freedom Fighter and Writer who was the First Principal of Earl Law College in Guwahati (now known as Government Law College), himself the son of the noted social worker Gunabhiram Barua.

Tagore was the eldest of three daughters and had two younger sisters, the late Oindrila Kunda and Romila Sen. Oindrila was the first in the family to act, and appeared in Tapan Sinha's Kabuliwala (1957) as a child. She later became an international bridge player.

Tagore attended St. John's Diocesan Girls' Higher Secondary School and Loreto Convent, Asansol. She made her film debut when she was a 13-year-old schoolgirl, after which her studies lost priority. Within a short while, her attendance and performance at school suffered, she came to be regarded as a bad influence on her classmates, and was faced with a choice of either doing films or studying further. At that point, her father advised her to move ahead in life, commit herself to a film career and 'give it her all' in order to become successful.

== Career ==
=== Beginnings and Cinematic Emergence (1958–1968) ===
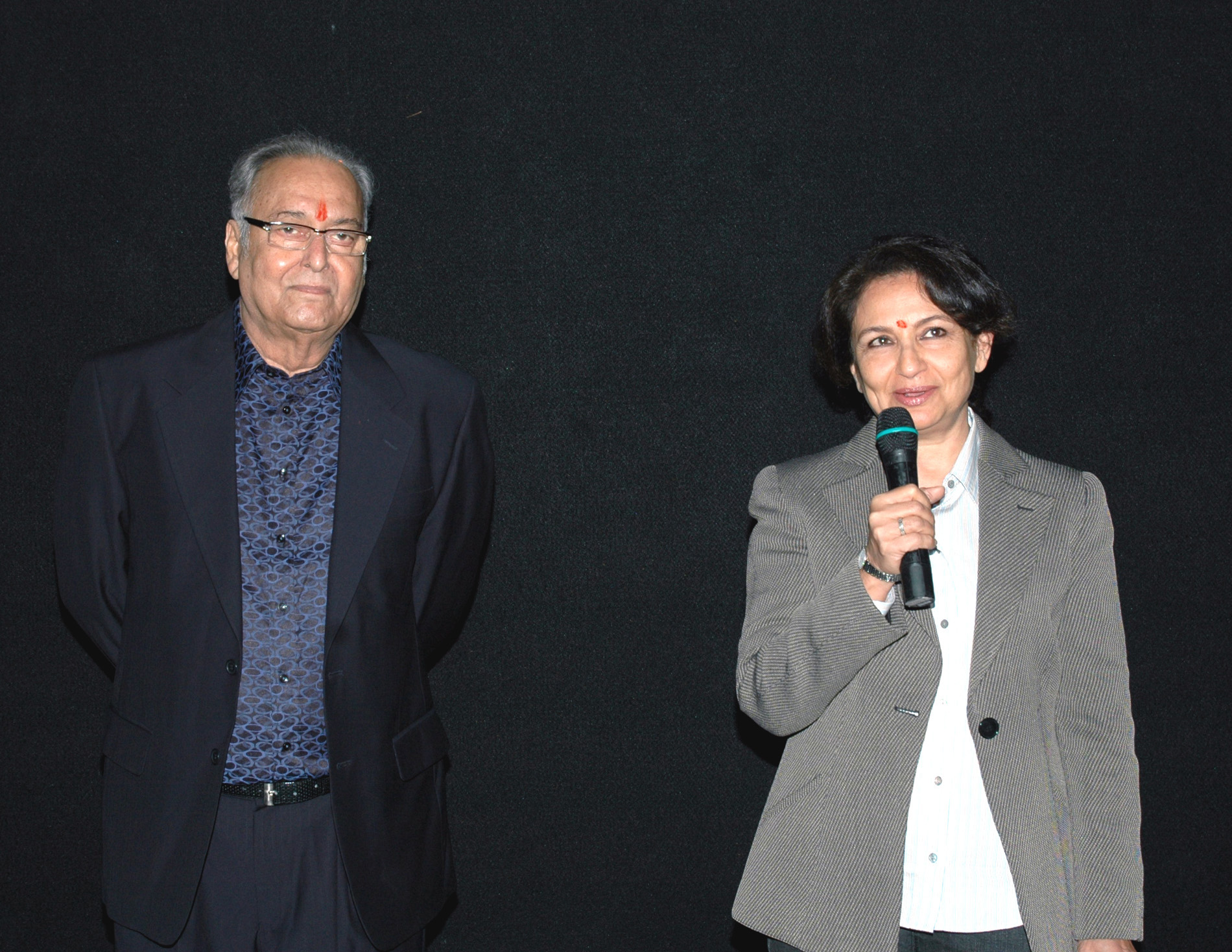
Sharmila Tagore with Soumitra Chatterjee at Apur Sansar presentation in 2009

Tagore began her career as an actress in Satyajit Ray's Bengali epic drama Apur Sansar (1959), as an ill-fated bride. In 1960, Ray cast her again in Devi, a film set in 1860 on Hindu orthodoxy and rational reforms, which she considers her favourite film and performance. She went onto appear in Bengali films Shes Anko and Nirjan Saikate, winning the IFFI Best Actor Award (Female) for the latter, alongside Chhaya Devi, Ruma Guha Thakurta, Renuka Devi and Bharati Devi.

Tagore made her Hindi film debut with Shakti Samanta's musical romance Kashmir Ki Kali (1964) alongside Shammi Kapoor. She and Samanta collaborated on several of his later films, including the romantic thriller An Evening in Paris (1967) again opposite Kapoor. With the film, she became the first Indian actress to appear in a swimsuit, which established Tagore as a sex symbol in Hindi films. While the scene in the film is often referred to as 'the bikini scene', Tagore's swimwear is actually a one piece. However, she did pose in a bikini for the cover of Filmfare magazine in 1966. But, when she was the chairperson of the Central Board of Film Certification 36 years later, she expressed concerns about the increased use of bikinis in Indian films.

Tagore went on to appear in films such as Waqt (1965) opposite Shashi Kapoor, Anupama (1966) opposite Dharmendra, Devar (1966) opposite Dharmendra, Sawan Ki Ghata (1966) opposite Manoj Kumar, Aamne Saamne (1967) opposite Shashi Kapoor, Mere Hamdam Mere Dost (1968) opposite Dharmendra and the Bengali film Nayak (1966) opposite Uttam Kumar. Her performance in Anupama proved to be her breakthrough in Hindi cinema.

=== Commercial success and stardom (1969–1979) ===
The 1970s marked the most successful period of Tagore's career with a string of critical and commercial successes. She worked alongside Rajesh Khanna on several films including Aradhana (1969), Safar (1970), Chhoti Bahu (1971), Amar Prem (1971), Raja Rani (1973), Daag (1973) and Avishkaar (1974), Maalik (1972). She won the Filmfare Award for Best Actress for Aradhana, and was nominated for Safar, Amar Prem and Daag. She was paired opposite Dharmendra in Satyakam (1969),Yakeen (1969), Chupke Chupke (1975), and Ek Mahal Ho Sapno Ka (1975).

Tagore teamed up again with Shashi Kapoor for Suhana Safar (1970), Aa Gale Lag Jaa (1973), and Paap Aur Punya (1974). She also paired with Amitabh Bachchan in Faraar (1975) and Besharam (1978).

In Gulzar's Mausam (1975), Tagore starred alongside Sanjeev Kumar, earning earned her first National Film Award for Best Actress, and her fifth nomination for the Filmfare Award for Best Actress. During this time, she also worked with Uttam Kumar in Amanush (1975), Anand Ashram (1977) and Dooriyaan (1979).

Tagore's other films during this period included Ek Se Badhkar Ek (1976), Tyaag (1977), which she also co-produced, and the Malayalam film Chuvanna Chirakukal (1978) among others.

=== Further success and sporadic work (1980–2010) ===
In the 1980s, Tagore appeared in Kalankini Kankabati (1981), Namkeen (1982), New Delhi Times (1986) and Swati (1986). She reunited with Dharmendra in the film Sunny (1984), which also featured Dharmendra's son Sunny Deol in the lead role. Her performance in the film earned her a nomination for the Filmfare Award for Best Supporting Actress.

Tagore starred in the Bengali action film Protidan (1983) opposite Naseeruddin Shah, and Mira Nair's interracial romantic drama Mississippi Masala (1991). She also appeared in supporting roles in Ghar Bazar (1998) and Mann (1999). She also appeared in two television shows, Katha Sagar (1986) for DD National and Zindagi (1999) for Star Plus.

Tagore was cast in her son Saif Ali Khan in his debut film Aashik Awara (1993) and the action drama Eklavya: The Royal Guard (2007). She appeared in supporting roles in the musical romantic drama Dhadkan (2000) and Abar Aranye (2003), the latter of which earned her the National Film Award for Best Supporting Actress. She also received critical acclaim for her performance in Shubho Mahurat (2003).

Tagore appeared in family drama Virruddh... Family Comes First (2005) alongside Bachchan, earning her sixth nomination for the Filmfare Award for Best Actress.

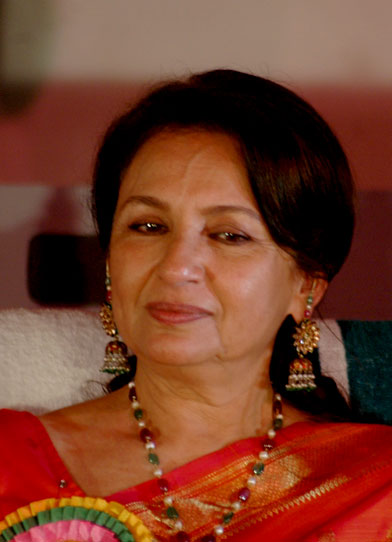
Tagore at an event

From 2007 to 2009, Tagore appeared in films such as Fool & Final (2007), Tasveer 8*10 (2009), Antaheen (2009) and the Marathi film Samaantar (2009). In 2009, she served on the jury at the 62nd Cannes Film Festival. She played a supporting role in the romantic comedy-drama Break Ke Baad (2010) before embarking on an acting hiatus.

=== Return to Cinema and acclaimed performances (2023 to Present) ===
Tagore made her comeback after a 13-year hiatus with the drama Gulmohar (2023), which released on Disney+ Hotstar. The film earned her critical acclaim, with the Hindustan Times noting that, "The elegance and poise Tagore exudes are remarkable. Her dialogue delivery, gestures, body language, emotions, everything looks just so effortless even after a long hiatus." India Today also opined that, "Tagore is always a joy to watch on screen. And, what a comeback!" Her performance earned her the Filmfare OTT Award for Best Actress Critics – Web Original Film, in addition to a nomination for Best Actress – Web Original Film.

In 2024, Tagore returned to Marathi films with Outhouse alongside Mohan Agashe, where she played a loving grandmother. Devesh Sharma of Filmfare noted, "Tagore brings warmth, wisdom, and a spark of curiosity to Aadima, portraying her as a nuanced blend of strength and vulnerability." Tagore made her comeback to Bengali films after 14 years with Suman Ghosh's Puratawn (2025). She appeared again in 2026 film Vibe, in the supporting role of Home Minister.

== Personal life ==
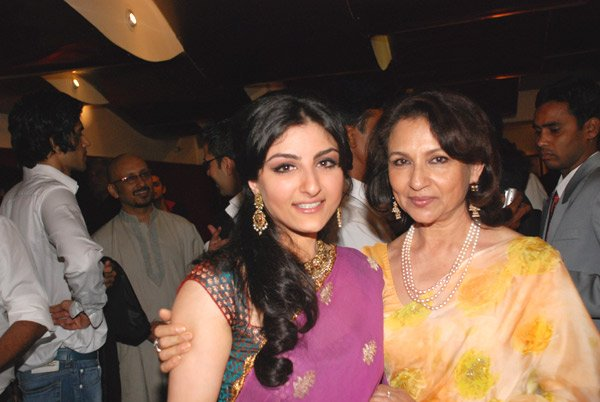
Tagore with her daughter Soha at the premiere of Khoya Khoya Chand

Tagore converted to Islam, changed her name to Begum Ayesha Sultana, and married Mansoor Ali Khan Pataudi, the titular Nawab of Pataudi and Bhopal and former captain of the Indian cricket team, on 27 December 1968. They had three children: Bollywood actor Saif Ali Khan (born 1970); Saba Ali Khan (born 1976), a jewellery designer; and Soha Ali Khan (born 1978), a Bollywood actress and TV personality. Mansoor Ali Khan Pataudi died at age 70 on 22 September 2011.

From 1991 to 2004, Saif was married to actress Amrita Singh. They have two children, daughter Sara Ali Khan (born 1995) and son Ibrahim Ali Khan (born 2001), both actors. His second marriage is to actress Kareena Kapoor in 2012 with whom he has two sons, Taimur Ali Khan (born 2016) and Jeh Ali Khan (born 2021). Soha married actor Kunal Khemu in 2015, and has a daughter Inaaya Naumi Khemmu (born 2017).

== Public image and legacy ==
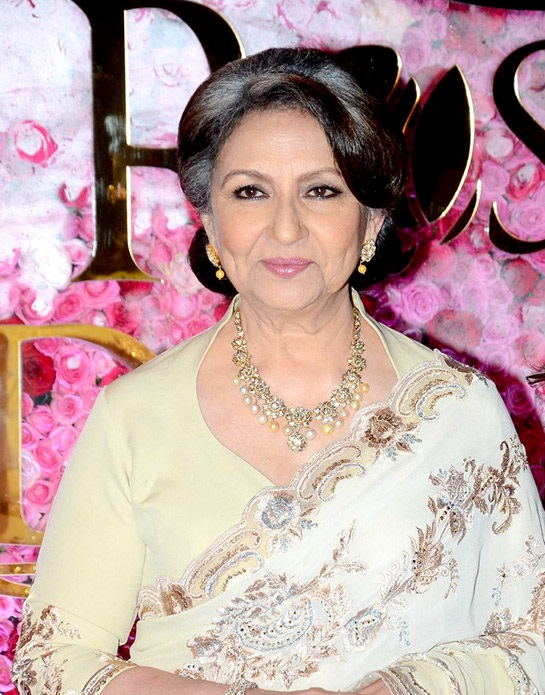
Tagore in 2016

Tagore was the highest paid Indian actress in the 1970s, and is considered an accomplished Indian cinema veteran. Surendra Kumar of The Sunday Guardian considers her to be an actress "ahead of her time" for balancing "the serious persona of realist Bengali films, and the Bollywood persona of films with song-and-dance sequences focused on success at the box office." She has received widespread critical acclaim for her on-screen work, both nationally and internationally. During the introduction of the 2025 Cannes Film Festival screening of Aranyer Din Ratri, American filmmaker Wes Anderson recalled watching the film 25 years ago "in a very strangely translated, blurry, scratchy, pirated DVD from a little Bollywood shop in New Jersey." He described Tagore's performance in Aranyer Din Ratri as "mysterious, cerebral, mesmerising."

Unlike most of her contemporaries in the 1960s, Tagore struck a convenient balance playing both glamorous and homely women on screen. She "explored roles beyond the stereotypical" in an era where women were rarely offered an opportunity to be more than "just a pretty appendage to the hero." Her wide range of complex female characters often circumvented the damsel in distress tropes, defying Indian societal norms and capturing a version of womanhood that is flawed but purposeful. According to Nandini Balial of Roger Ebert, she "redefined what an Indian woman could do in a film," and "altered the cinematic landscape for leading ladies." Balial goes on to say that Tagore's women epitomised that "being demure didn't mean being spineless, [and that] emotional devastation wasn't a death sentence." Filmfare considered her portrayal of a foul-mouthed shrew-ish sex-worker in Mausam as one of the most iconic Bollywood performances.

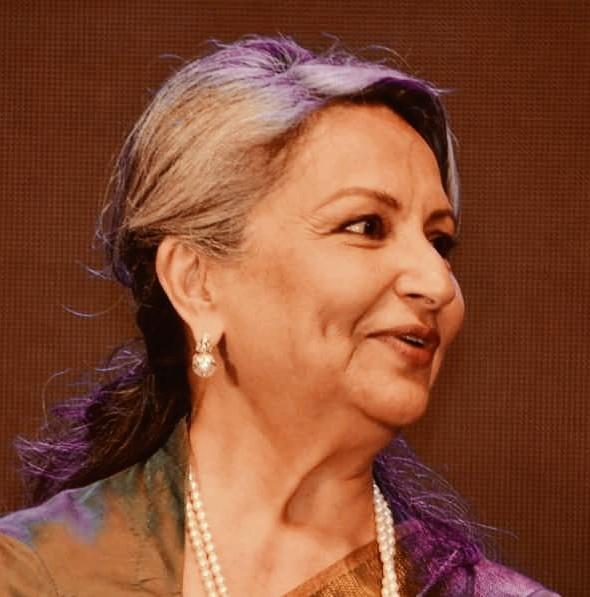
Tagore in 2018

Bucking the Indian film industry's expectations from actresses, Tagore wore a one-piece swimsuit for her 1967 film An Evening In Paris. She was the first Bollywood actress to have done so, paving the way for Dimple Kapadia in Bobby (1973), Zeenat Aman in Qurbani (1980), and Parveen Babi in Yeh Nazdeekiyan (1982). Her 1969 Filmfare magazine cover, where Tagore poses in a two-piece bikini, was publicly labelled as "obscene" and "attention-seeking." She said her An Evening In Paris director Shakti Samanta called her after the magazine hit the stands and said,"If you want to be in the public eye, this is not the way to go." He also asked Tagore, who was in London at the time, to return to India immediately. Tagore was "really hurt" by the cover being interpreted as her trying to "be upwardly mobile" and "catch eyeballs." In a televised interview with Karan Johar, she confirmed that "questions were asked in the [Indian] Parliament" following the controversy, and she strategically chose the wife-mother role in Aradhana as her next on-screen appearance.

With her voluminous hairdos and chiffon floral-print sarees, Tagore's sense of fashion seamlessly blended traditional elegance with modern glamour. Numerous Indian actresses have gone to emulate her retro-vintage style in recent times, including Anushka Sharma for Bombay Velvet, Preity Zinta for Rab Ne Bana Di Jodi, and Deepika Padukone in Om Shanti Om. Film historian Sanjay Mukhopadhyay said that her "most significant contribution to Indian cinema is a sense of dignity and grace—after Waheeda Rehman, she was the only actress of her time who exuded this." Mukhopadhyay adds that with a "strong Tagore lineage coupled with the Pataudi gharana (family dynasty)" she was a "bourgeois star with a biography" who "occupied a cultural space beyond the reach of commoner—she could be looked at, but not possessed."

Tagore was inducted into the Bollywood Walk of Fame at Bandra Bandstand, Mumbai.

== Filmography ==
=== Films ===
Year	Title	Role	Language	Notes	Ref.
1959	Apur Sansar	Aparna	Bengali		
1960	Devi	Doyamoyee	Bengali		
1963	Shes Anko	Soma	Bengali		
1963	Nirjan Saikate	Renu	Bengali		
1963	Barnali	Aloka Choudhury	Bengali		
1963	Chhaya Shurjo	Ghentoo	Bengali		
1964	Subha O Debatar Gras		Bengali		
1964	Kinu Gowalar Gali	Neera	Bengali		
1964	Kashmir Ki Kali	Champa	Hindi		
1965	Waqt	Renu Khanna	Hindi		
1965	Dak Ghar	Herself	Hindi	Guest appearance	
1966	Anupama	Uma Sharma	Hindi		
1966	Devar	Madhumati / Banwariya	Hindi		
1966	Sawan Ki Ghata	Seema	Hindi		
1966	Nayak	Aditi	Bengali		
1966	Yeh Raat Phir Na Aayegi	Kiran / Kiranmai	Hindi		
1967	Milan Ki Raat	Aarti	Hindi		
1967	An Evening in Paris	Deepa / Roopa "Suzy"	Hindi		
1967	Aamne Saamne	Sapna	Hindi		
1968	Mere Hamdam Mere Dost	Anita	Hindi		
1968	Humsaya	Leena Sen	Hindi		
1968	Dil Aur Mohabbat	Anuradha Verma	Hindi		
1969	Pyasi Sham	Madhu	Hindi		
1969	Satyakam	Ranjana	Hindi		
1969	Talash	Madhu / Gauri	Hindi		
1969	Aradhana	Vandhana Tripathi	Hindi		
1969	Yakeen	Rita	Hindi		
1970	Aranyer Din Ratri	Aparna	Bengali		
1970	Suhana Safar	Sapna	Hindi		
1970	Mere Humsafar	Taruna / Meenakshi	Hindi		
1970	My Love	Sangeeta Thakur	Hindi		
1970	Safar	Neela Kapoor	Hindi		
1971	Seemabaddha	Tutul	Bengali		
1971	Chhoti Bahu	Radha	Hindi		
1971	Badnam Farishte	Lawyer Renu	Hindi	Special appearance	
1972	Amar Prem	Pushpa	Hindi		
1972	Dastaan	Meena	Hindi		
1972	Yeh Gulistan Hamara	Soo Reni	Hindi		
1972	Maalik	Savitri	Hindi		
1973	Raja Rani	Nirmala / Rani	Hindi		
1973	Daag	Sonia Kohli	Hindi		
1973	Aa Gale Lag Jaa	Preeti	Hindi		
1974	Shaandaar	Pratima	Hindi		
1974	Avishkaar	Mansi	Hindi		
1974	Paap Aur Punya	Jugni	Hindi		
1974	Charitraheen	Rama Chaudhary	Hindi		
1974	Shaitaan	Nisha	Hindi		
1974	Jadu Bansha	Mala	Bengali		
1975	Mausam	Chanda / Kajli	Hindi		
1975	Anari	Poonam	Hindi		
1975	Chupke Chupke	Sulekha Chaturvedi	Hindi		
1975	Faraar	Mala / Asha	Hindi		
1975	Ek Mahal Ho Sapno Ka	Aruna	Hindi		
1975	Amanush	Lekha	Bilingual		
1975	Khushboo	Lakhi	Hindi		
1976	Ek Se Badhkar Ek	Rekha	Hindi		
1976	Do Shatru	Rajkumari / Kaali	Hindi		
1977	Anand Ashram	Asha	Bilingual		
1977	Tyaag	Sunita	Hindi	Also co-producer	
1978	Besharam	Rinku / Monica	Hindi		
1979	Chuvanna Chirakukal	Jessinta Issac	Malayalam		
1979	Dooriyaan	Lalita	Hindi		
1979	Griha Pravesh	Mansi	Hindi		
1979	Mother		Bengali		
1981	Kalankini Kankabati	Aparna / Kanka	Bengali		
1981	Naseeb	Herself	Hindi	Cameo	
1982	Namkeen	Nimki	Hindi		
1982	Desh Premee	Bharti	Hindi		
1983	Protidan	Gouri	Bengali		
1983	Gehri Chot – Urf: Durdesh	Shobha	Bilingual		
1983	Doosri Dulhan	Renu	Hindi		
1984	Sunny	Sitara	Hindi		
1984	Jawaani	Sushma	Hindi		
1984	Divorce	Chandra	Hindi		
1984	Milenge Kabhi		Hindi		
1985	Ek Se Bhale Do	Mary D'Mello	Hindi		
1985	Bandhan Anjana		Hindi		
1986	New Delhi Times	Nisha	Hindi		
1986	Maa Beti	Savitri	Hindi		
1986	Swati	Sharda	Hindi		
1986	Ricky	Advocate Rukmini Khanna	HIndi		
1987	7 Saal Baad	Nisha	Hindi		
1988	Anurodh	Jaya / Maya	Bengali		
1988	Hum To Chale Pardes	Trishna	Hindi	Guest appearance	
1989	Doorie	Nisha	Hindi		
1991	Mississippi Masala	Kinnu	English		
1991	Dastoor	Mohini Devi	Hindi		
1993	Aashiq Awara	Mrs. Singh	Hindi		
1998	Ghar Bazar		Hindi		
1999	Mann	Suhana Devi Singh	Hindi		
2000	Dhadkan	Jhanvi Ranjan Chopra	Hindi		
2002	Abar Aranye	Aparna Asim	Bengali		
2003	Shubho Mahurat	Padmini Chowdhury	Bengali		
2005	Viruddh... Family Comes First	Sumitra Patwardhan	Hindi		
2006	Eklavya: The Royal Guard	Rani Suhasini Devi	Hindi		
2007	Fool & Final	Lajwanti Bhabhi	Hindi		
2009	Antaheen	Pishima Chowdhury	Bengali		
2009	8 x 10 Tasveer	Savitri Puri	Hindi		
2009	Morning Walk	Neelima	Hindi		
2009	Samaantar	Shama Vaze	Marathi		
2010	Break Ke Baad	Ayesha Khan	Hindi		
2023	Gulmohar	Kusum Batra	Hindi		
2024	OutHouse	Aadima	Marathi		
2025	Puratawn	Mrs. Sen	Bengali		
2026	Vibe	Home Minister	Hindi		

=== Television ===
Year	Title	Role	Notes	Ref.
1986	Katha Sagar	Various		
1999–2000	Zindagi	Kamal's warden		

=== Music videos ===
Year	Title	Performer(s)	Ref.
1988	"Mile Sur Mera Tumhara"	Various	

== Accolades ==
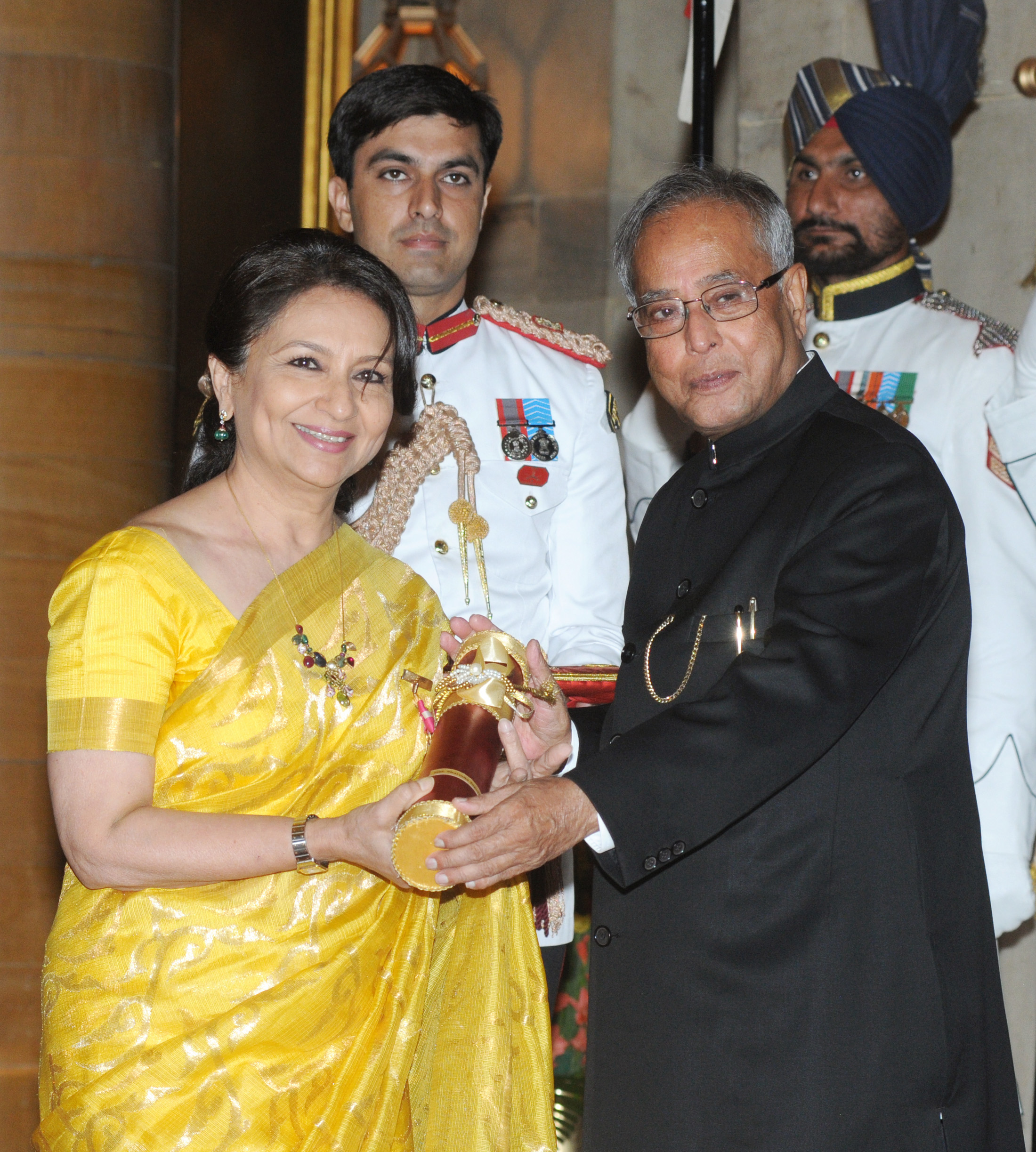
Tagore receiving Padma Bhushan from President, Pranab Mukherjee

=== Civilian awards ===
Year	Award	Work	Result	Ref.
1999	Order of Arts and Letters	Contribution to the Cinema	Honoured	
2013	Padma Bhushan	Contribution in the Field of Arts	Honoured	

=== Film awards ===
Year	Award	Category	Work	Result	Ref.
1965	International Film Festival of India	Best Actor (Female)	Nirjan Saikate	Won	
1970	Filmfare Awards	Best Actress	Aradhana	Won	
1971	Filmfare Awards	Best Actress	Safar	Nominated	
1973	Filmfare Awards	Best Actress	Amar Prem	Nominated	
1974	Filmfare Awards	Best Actress	Daag	Nominated	
1976	National Film Awards	Best Actress	Mausam	Won	
1977	Filmfare Awards	Best Actress	Mausam	Nominated	
1985	Filmfare Awards	Best Supporting Actress	Sunny	Nominated	
2003	National Film Awards	Best Supporting Actress	Abar Aranye	Won	
2006	Filmfare Awards	Best Actress	Viruddh	Nominated	
2006	Screen Awards	Best Actress	Viruddh	Nominated	
2023	Filmfare OTT Awards	Best Actress Critics - Web Original Film	Gulmohar	Won	
2023	Filmfare OTT Awards	Best Actress - Web Original Film	Gulmohar	Nominated	
2025	South Asian Film Festival	Best Actress	Puratawn	Won	
2025	New York Film Festival	Best Actress	Puratawn	Won	

=== Honorary awards ===
Year	Organizations	Awards	Result	Ref.
1998	43rd Filmfare Awards	Lifetime Achievement Award	Honoured	
2002	Screen Awards	Lifetime Achievement Award	Honoured	
2010	Anandalok Puraskar	Lifetime Achievement Award	Honoured	
2011	12th IIFA Awards	Outstanding Achievement in Indian Cinema	Won	
2011	12th IIFA Awards	Lifetime Achievement Award	Honoured	
2012	Edinburgh University	Honorary Doctorate of Arts	Honoured	
2019	Hello! Hall of Fame Award	Lifetime Achievement Award	Honoured	
2023	Bimal Roy Memorial Awards	Lifetime Achievement Award	Honoured	
