= CID Agent 302 =

- Directed by: S. Azim
- Starring: Tun Tun; Azad; Indira Billi
- Music by: Iqbal
- Release date: 1968
- Country: India
- Language: Hindi

CID Agent 302 is a 1968 Bollywood Hindi thriller film which stars Tun Tun as the leading lady. Special effects were by Prasad Process. Its songs were by Tabisa Kanpuri and Aziz Ghazi sung by Asha Bhonsle, Usha Mangeshkar, Mahendra Kapoor.

== Cast ==
- Tun Tun
- Indira Billi
- Narmada Shankar
- Azad
- Mohan Sherry

== Music ==
All songs were composed by Iqbal:

1. "Bacho Jaan Fas Gayi Museebat Mein" -
2. "Bhari Mehfil Mein Ham Is Baat Ka Izahaar Karte Hai" -
3. "Ham Liye Jaa Rahe Bade Naaz Se" -
4. "Hello Hello Sweety Kya Kahaane TeriBeauty" -
5. "Mausam Bada Sharaabi Bahaki Nazar Hamaari" -
