= Kashmir Ki Kali =

1964 film by Shakti Samanta

- Film poster
- Directed by: Shakti Samanta
- Written by: Ranjan Bose; Ramesh Pant
- Produced by: Shakti Samanta
- Starring: Shammi Kapoor; Sharmila Tagore; Pran; Nazir Hussain
- Cinematography: V. N. Reddy
- Edited by: Dharamvir
- Music by: O. P. Nayyar; S.H. Bihari (lyrics)
- Distributed by: Shakti Films
- Release date: 20 November 1964
- Running time: 168 minutes
- Country: India
- Language: Hindi

Kashmir Ki Kali (lit. 'The Bud of Kashmir') is a 1964 Indian Hindi-language romance film directed by Shakti Samanta. The film stars Shammi Kapoor, Sharmila Tagore in her Hindi movie debut role, Pran, Dhumal, Nazir Hussain and Anoop Kumar. The music was composed by O.P. Nayyar and the lyrics penned by S.H. Bihari. It became the sixth-highest-grossing film of the year. The film was remade in Telugu as Srungara Ramudu.

== Plot ==
Wealthy and pampered Rajiv Lal is the only son of widowed Rani Maa. At the silver jubilee anniversary of the mill that his father, the late Sanjiv Lal opened, he announces a bonus of 5 lakh rupees for all the workers, annoying his mother. A servant at the house, Karuna, suggests marrying him off to stop his immature antics, to which Rani Maa agrees. Her manager, Shyamlal, arranges for her to meet some girls, as she insists that Rajiv will marry a girl of her choice. Rajiv returns home and sees all the girls – he correctly surmises that his mother wants him to marry, and he pretends to be a mute who walks with a limp in order to chase all the prospective suitors off. His plan succeeds, although he is in a dilemma as his mother is furious at him. One of his friends suggests that he should go away to their bungalow in Kashmir – after all, Rani Maa never goes there.

Upon arrival in Kashmir, he finds that his estate manager, Bholaram, has made a hotel out of their bungalow and has rented out some rooms for the season. He tells the tenants that he is Rajiv Lal, although when he meets Bholaram, the latter informs him that Rani Maa had called him, and told him not to let Rajiv stay at the bungalow, should he come. Rajiv manages to convince Bholaram to tell Rani Maa that he is not there. Bholaram tells the tenants in the house that Rajiv is mad, and in his madness, thinks that he is the real owner of the estate.

The next day, Rajiv meets Champa, a girl who sells flowers for a living. He buys her flowers for 20 rupees when they are priced at 5, and tells her that he is not the owner, but the driver. Soon enough, after a few misadventures, they fall in love and decide to marry, but there are a few obstacles. First of all, Mohan, the forest manager, has loaned out some money to Champa's father, Dinu, and he insists on marrying Champa if Dinu cannot repay the debt.

Things become complicated when Mohan finds out that Dinu is not Champa's real father, and he blackmails Dinu into getting Champa married to him, or else he will let out the secret to Champa. Champa still continues to meet Rajiv on the sly, but all of that comes to an end when three girls, who are tenants in his house, reveal in her presence that he is not the driver, but the owner of the estate. Feeling betrayed, Champa runs off. Before Rajiv can go after her, he receives a trunk call from his mother, and he is informed that Karuna is seriously ill.

After telling Bholaram to explain everything to Champa, he leaves for Bombay, and finds Karuna on her deathbed, with Rani Maa at her side. Karuna tells Rajiv that he is not the real son of Rani Maa and that his biological father is none other than her brother, Dinu. Many years ago, Dinu had sold him off to Karuna for alcohol, and Rani Maa had taken him in. Soon after, Rani Maa gave birth to a baby girl, but Dinu abducted her, intending to kill her so that Rajiv would be the sole heir to Rani Maa's wealth.

However, on the way, Dinu tripped and fell, losing his eyesight, so he did not kill the girl. Rajiv is shocked at the revelation, but more so is Rani Maa, who had assumed that her baby girl was still-born. Before Karuna can say who the girl is, she dies. Shyamlal informs the two that the day Karuna fell ill, a man from Kashmir had come to see her and asked about Rani Maa's girl, but Karuna hadn't told him anything. The man turns out to be Mohan. Rajiv and Rani Maa head back to Kashmir to find out who the girl is, and Rajiv, acting on a tip from Bholaram, goes to confront Mohan.

He beats Mohan unconscious, and Mohan's friend tells Rajiv who the girl is – Champa. He goes to find her and finds out that she will marry Mohan in a few days. Dinu returns home and Champa questions him. He lies to her at first, but when Rajiv drops a hint that he is the son that Dinu had sold all those years ago, the latter hugs him and admits that Champa is not his daughter. Rani Maa comes in and finds Champa, and the two embrace. Mohan arrives with his goons and decides to forcibly marry Champa.

Dinu tries to stop him, but Mohan beats him badly. The goons tie Rajiv up and take Rani Maa and Champa to the wedding venue forcibly. Back at Rajiv's bungalow, Chander, Rajiv's friend, and Shyamlal decide to go after them and see why they are taking so long. Rajiv manages to escape from his captors, but Dinu is still unconscious. He meets Chander and Shyamlal on the way and tells them to get the police while he goes after Mohan.

He breaks into Mohan's hideout and stops the wedding ceremony. A fight ensues, and Mohan runs off, Rajiv hot on his tail. The police arrive soon after and arrest all of Mohan's goons. Meanwhile, Rajiv and Mohan get into a fight, and the police come to take the latter away. The film ends with a shot of Rajiv and Champa, happily married, driving away in his car.

== Cast ==
- Shammi Kapoor as Rajeev Lal
- Sharmila Tagore as Champa
- Pran as Mohan
- Nasir Hussain as Dinu
- Dhumal as Bholaram
- Anoop Kumar as Chander
- Madan Puri as Shyamala
- Padmadevi
- Bir Sakuja as Colonel
- Sunder as Lala
- Mridula Rani as Karuna
- Tun Tun as Rama Devi
- Padma Chavan
- Sujatha
- Neeta
- Samar Chatterjee
- Aruna
- Hameeda
- Sabita
- Pradeep Chaudhury
- Shukla

== Production ==
The film's shooting was stalled for 21 days due to incessant heavy rains in Kashmir. After weather cleared, it didn't rain for the next 25 days, and the entire Kashmir schedule was completed. Recommended by film's lead Shammi Kapoor himself, originally duo Shankar–Jaikishan were to compose film's music, however veteran composer OP Nayyar invited Samanta to listen to some tunes, which he liked. Eventually 12 were selected for the film, and the remainder were used in Sawan Ki Ghata (1966).

== Soundtrack ==
Kashmir Ki Kali

Soundtrack album by O. P. Nayyar
- Released: 1964 (India)
- Recorded: 1963
- Genre: Film soundtrack
- Length: 35:19
- Label: Sa Re Ga Ma
- Producer: Shakti Samanta

O. P. Nayyar chronology
Phir Wohi Dil Laya Hoon (1963)	Kashmir Ki Kali (1964)	Mere Sanam (1965)

The film's music was composed by O. P. Nayyar, and the lyrics were penned by S. H. Bihari. Mohammed Rafi sang four solos for Shammi Kapoor and three duets with Asha Bhosle. There are a total of 9 songs in this film soundtrack, out of which 7 songs are picturised in the film and the rest 2 songs (both are solo songs by Asha Bhosle) are edited from the film.

Originally, Shankar–Jaikishan were chosen to compose the music score for the film but when O. P. Nayyar had Shammi Kapoor listen to some of his compositions, he was immediately chosen as the music composer of the film. The soundtrack consists of 9 songs.

Song	Singer	Raga
"Kisi Na Kisi Se, Kabhi Na Kabhi, Kahin Na Kahin"	Mohammed Rafi	
"Taarif Karoon Kya Uski"	Mohammed Rafi	
"Subhanallah, Haseen Chehra, Yeh Mastana Adayen"	Mohammed Rafi	
"Hai Duniya Usiki, Zamana Usika"	Mohammed Rafi	Desh (raga)
"Isharon Isharon Mein Dil Lenewale"	Mohammed Rafi, Asha Bhosle	Pahadi
"Haay Re Haay, Yeh Mere Haath Mein Tera Haath"	Mohammed Rafi, Asha Bhosle	
"Deewana Hua Badal, Sawan Ki Ghata Chhayi"	Mohammed Rafi, Asha Bhosle	
"Balma Khuli Hawa Mein"	Asha Bhosle	
"Phir Thes Lagi Dil Ko"	Asha Bhosle	
