= 3rd International Film Festival of India =

Indian film festival in 1965

- Awarded for: Best of World cinema
- Presented by: Directorate of Film Festivals
- Presented on: 21 January 1965
- Official website: www.iffigoa.org
- Best Feature Film: Gamperaliya

The 3rd International Film Festival of India was held from 8 to 21 January 1965 in New Delhi. The third edition was the first competitive film festival ever held in India, inaugurated by the then President of India Sarvepalli Radhakrishnan. The festival, chaired by Satyajit Ray, was for the first time graded category ‘A’ by the Paris-based Federation International de Producers de Films. With this recognition, the festival in India came on par with Cannes, Berlin, Venice, Karlovy Vary and Moscow International film festivals.

== Winners ==
- Golden Peacock (Best Film): "Gamperaliya" (Sri Lankan film)
- Silver Peacock (Best Film): "Nirjan Saikate" (Indian film)
- Golden Peacock (Best Short Film): "Cyclone" (Cuban film)
- IFFI Best Actor Award (Female) (Silver Peacock) - Sharmila Tagore, Ruma Guha Thakurta, Chhaya Debi, Renuka Debi, and Bharati Debi for "Nirjan Saikate" (Indian film)

=== Opening film ===
- "Ivaylo" by "Nikola Valchev"

=== Closing film ===
- "America America" by "Elia Kazan"
