= Puratawn =

2025 Indian Bengali-language drama film

- Theatrical release poster
- Directed by: Suman Ghosh
- Written by: Suman Ghosh
- Produced by: Rituparna Sengupta
- Starring: Sharmila Tagore; Rituparna Sengupta; Indraneil Sengupta; Brishti Ray
- Cinematography: Ravi Kiran Ayyagari
- Edited by: Aditya Vikram Sengupta
- Music by: Alokananda Dasgupta
- Production company: Bhavna Aaj O Kal
- Distributed by: PVR Inox Pictures
- Release date: 11 April 2025
- Running time: 98 minutes
- Country: India
- Language: Bengali
- Box office: est.₹1.52 crore

Puratawn (transl. The Ancient), also marketed as Puratawn: The Ancient is a 2025 Indian Bengali‐language psychological drama film written and directed by Suman Ghosh. Produced by Rituparna Sengupta under her banner of Bhavna Aaj O Kal, the film stars Sharmila Tagore as a matriarch experiencing memory decline, alongside Rituparna as her daughter, Indraneil Sengupta, and Brishti Ray in supporting roles.

The film was announced in February 2023, marking Tagore's comeback in Bengali cinema after 14 years, in Ghosh's second collaboration with Sengupta. Principal photography commenced in November 2023 and wrapped by in January 2024, with filming taking places in Kolkata, Hooghly and Konnagar. Music of the film is composed by Alokananda Dasgupta. Ravi Kiran Ayyagari handled its cinematography, while Aditya Vikram Sengupta edited the film.

Puratawn was theatrically released on 11 April 2025, coinciding with Pohela Boishakh. It opened highly to positive reviews and critics were appraisal of Tagore and Sengupta's performance, cinematography and direction. It grossed ₹1.52 crore at the box office, emerging to be the fifth highest grossing Bengali film of 2025.

== Plot ==
Ritika, a busy professional, returns to her ancestral home for her mother's 80th birthday only to discover Mrs. Sen suffering from memory lapses and confusion. As Ritika navigates past grievances and unspoken regrets, the narrative interweaves present‐day moments with Mrs. Sen's fragmented recollections of youth, exploring themes of memory, loss, and familial bonds.

== Cast ==
- Sharmila Tagore as Mrs. Sen
- Rituparna Sengupta as Ritika
- Indraneil Sengupta as Rajib
- Ekavali Khanna as Dr. Gaurika Kapoor, the family physician
- Brishti Ray as Heera, the family's house help
- Subhrajit Dutta as Mr. Sen, the family patriarch

== Production ==
Puratwan marks Sharmila Tagore's return to Bengali cinema after a 14-year hiatus, her last Bengali film being Antaheen in 2009. The project originated from Tagore's desire to perform in her mother tongue, Bengali, prompting Sengupta to collaborate with Ghosh to develop a script centered on a mother-daughter relationship. Filming took place in 2023, with a significant portion shot over 14–15 days at a resort on the banks of the river Ganga in West Bengal's Hooghly district, including locations like Konnagar. The production faced challenges, such as shooting in a building without lifts, requiring the cast, including the 80-year-old Tagore, to climb three storeys, which she found physically taxing. Despite these difficulties, Tagore described the experience as comfortable due to the ease of improvising dialogues in Bengali and the supportive environment provided by Ghosh and Sengupta. The film, exploring themes of memory loss and familial bonds, was crafted with a focus on thoughtful and realistic storytelling, as per Tagore's preference for meaningful roles.

== Music ==
The original score was composed by Alokananda Dasgupta.

== Release ==
The official trailer was released on YouTube on 14 March 2025. Puratawn premiered theatrically across West Bengal on 11 April 2025 and expanded nationwide on 18 April 2025.

== Reception ==
=== Critical response ===
Zinia Bandyopadhyay, writing for India Today, praised Puratawn's comeback, particularly calling Sharmila Tagore's performance “powerful and emotional.” Poorna Banerjee, in Times of India, described the film as a “sensitive portrayal of memory and relationships,” though noting the narrative felt slow at times. Devesh Sharma, in Filmfare, termed Tagore's acting a “masterclass,” with Rituparna Sengupta's role as a “strong complement.” Sanatnu Das, in Hindustan Times, lauded Tagore's portrayal of a woman losing her memory as “a performance of a lifetime,” calling the film “profound and touching.” Agnivo Niyogi, in The Telegraph India, presented Puratawn as “an ode to memories,” praising Suman Ghosh's direction as “subtle and impactful.” Saptarshi Roy, in Anandabazar Patrika, appreciated the chemistry between Tagore and Sengupta as “delicately portrayed,” though found the story slightly overlong. The review in Aaj Tak Bangla called the film “emotionally rich,” hailing Tagore's comeback as “historic for Bengali cinema.” Sandipta Bhanja, in Sangbad Pratidin, described the film as “a beautiful depiction of human emotions,” with Tagore and Sengupta's performances “outstanding in every scene.”
