= Gurcharan Pohli =

- Also known as: Pohli
- Born: Gurcharan Singh Pohli; 24 June 1942 (age 84); Chak No. 51, Punjab Province, British India
- Genres: Punjabi duets, solos, lok-tath and lok-katha(Folk)
- Occupations: Singer, Actor
- Instruments: Vocals, tumbi, harmonium, dholak
- Years active: 1960s-1990
- Label: His Master's Voice

Gurcharan Singh Pohli (born June 24, 1942) is an Indian singer and actor who worked in Punjabi and Hindi films. He is best known for his Punjabi duets with his wife, singer Promila Pammi. He was very active in the industry from the 1960s to the late 1980s. As an actor, he is most remembered for his role as Ghukkar in the movie Balbeero Bhabi (1981).

== Early life and family background ==
Pohli was born in village Chak No. 51, Pakpattan Tehsil of Montgomery District (now in Pakpattan District) of Punjab in British India. Due to partition, his family moved to village Kot Karor Kalan near Talwandi Bhai in Firozpur District of East Punjab, India. He married his stage partner singer Promila Pammi and the family is now settled in California.

== Career ==
He learned the music from Ustad Jaswant Bhanwra. He recorded mostly his songs and live performances with Promila Pammi for approximately 20 years. They were one of the most famous singing couples of Punjab in the 1970s and '80s as Pohli-Pammi. Pohli was always keen to work in movies. Director Boota Singh Shaad gave him first chance in his Punjabi movie Kulli Yaar Di (1969) as a playback singer. Pohli went to Bombay to try his luck in movies. He got a break as an actor in 1974 Hindi movie Kora Badan, which was also directed by Boota Singh Shaad. After that, he worked in many Hindi movies such as Chattan Singh, Paap Aur Punya and Sharafat Chhod Di Maine. Pohli used 'Shera' as his screen name in most of his Hindi movies. He came back to Punjab and worked in few Punjabi movies as well. He is most remembered for his villainous role of Ghukkar in the Punjabi movie Balbeero Bhabi (1981). After that, he worked in a few other Punjabi movies such as Yaari Jatt Di (1984), Patola (1987) and Jatt Soormay (1988).

== Filmography ==
Year	Title	Role	Language	Notes
1969	Kulli Yaar Di	Playback Singer	Punjabi	Playback Singer
1974	Kora Badan		Hindi	
1974	Paap Aur Punya	Shera- Tiger's associate	Hindi	Credited as Shera
1974	Chattan Singh	Daaku Sant Singh	Hindi	Credited as Shera
1974	Hawas	Shera- Kamini's associate	Hindi	
1974	Hamrahi	Shera- V.k's associate	Hindi	
1975	Sanyasi	Guy in fake Sanyasi group	Hindi	
1975	Do Jasoos	Prem's associate	Hindi	
1976	Sharafat Chhod Di Maine	Kaalu	Hindi	Credited as Shera
1977	Dil Aur Patthar		Hindi	
1981	Balbeero Bhabi	Ghukkar	Punjabi	Credited as Gurcharan Singh Pohli
1983	Roop Shaukeenan Da	Jora	Punjabi	
1984	Yaari Jatt Di	Deepa	Punjabi	
1986	Kee Banu Duniyan Da	Pohli Kalaakar	Punjabi	
1987	Patola	Mangal	Punjabi	
1988	Jatt Soormay	Jangaa	Punjabi	
