= Ek Mahal Ho Sapno Ka =

- Theatrical release poster
- Directed by: Devendra Goel
- Screenplay by: Mushtaq Jalili
- Dialogues by: Mushtaq Jalili; Dr. Balkrishna
- Story by: Mushtaq Jalili
- Produced by: Devendra Goel
- Starring: Ashok Kumar; Dharmendra; Sharmila Tagore; Leena Chandavarkar; Deven Verma
- Cinematography: Keki Mistry
- Edited by: R. V. Shrikhande
- Music by: Ravi
- Production company: Goel Cine Corporation
- Release date: 9 July 1975
- Running time: 152 mins
- Country: India
- Language: Hindi

Ek Mahal Ho Sapno Ka (transl. A Palace of Dreams) is a 1975 Indian Hindi-language drama film directed by Devendra Goel. It stars Dharmendra, Sharmila Tagore and Leena Chandavarkar in the lead roles, supported by Ashok Kumar and Deven Verma.

The lyrics of the film’s songs were penned by Sahir Ludhianvi and the music was composed by Ravi.

== Cast ==
- Ashok Kumar as Anand Kumar (Sonia’s father)
- Dharmendra as Vishal (Aruna’s boyfriend and later husband)
- Sharmila Tagore as Aruna (Vishal’s girlfriend and later wife)
- Leena Chandavarkar as Sonia (Anand’s daughter)
- Ramesh Deo as Dr. Mathur
- Achala Sachdev as Vishal's Mother
- Deven Verma
- David
- Mohan Sherry
- Jagdish Raj

== Plot ==
Vishal and Aruna fall in love. Aruna finds out from Dr. Mathur that she suffers from optic atrophy and will go blind within 6 months and is devastated. Not wanting to be a burden on Vishal who is already taking care of his disabled mother, she decides to leave him. Aruna decides to marry Anand Kumar, her much older employer, who is reluctant to spoil her life. Vishal is confused of why she has betrayed him.

At the end of 6 months, fearing that the day of going blind has arrived, a terrified Aruna faints. Dr Mathur is pleasantly surprised to see her report. It is revealed that due to a medical strike, Aruna's earlier report was wrong and her eyesight is fine. Aruna learns that Anand Kumar's daughter Sonia is in love with Vishal and decides to sacrifice her love. She meets Vishal and asks him to forget her. Sonia overhears the conversation and is shocked. Realising her mistake, she tries to convince Aruna to marry Vishal.

Anand dies in an accident and Aruna is severely injured. She feigns blindness so that Sonia can marry Vishal. When Sonia discovers Aruna's sacrifice she goes to tell Vishal about it. Vishal regrets he misunderstood Aruna. Aruna sends Vishal a letter asking him to marry Sonia mentioning that she is going away and he must never find her. Prakash who lusts for Aruna kidnaps her. Vishal and Sonia fight the goons and save Aruna. In the end, Aruna and Vishal are married.

== Music and soundtrack ==
The lyrics of the songs were penned by Sahir Ludhianvi and the film music was composed by Ravi.The title song Ek Mahal Ho Sapno Ka, Phoolonbhara Aangan Ho was orginaly sung by Kishore Kumar and Lata Mangeshkar. However the producer of the film who had originally insisted that Kishore sing the song, was not satisfied with the outcome and the decision was made to re-record the song with Mohammed Rafi as the male singer alongside Lata Mangeshkar.

Song	Singer
"Humse Poocho Ke Haqeeqat"	Kishore Kumar
"Dekha Hai Zindagi Ko"	Kishore Kumar
"Dil Mein Kisi Ke Pyar Ka (Male)"	Kishore Kumar
"Dil Mein Kisi Ke Pyar Ka (Female)"	Lata Mangeshkar
"Ek Mahal Ho Sapno Ka, Phoolonbhara Aangan Ho"	Lata Mangeshkar, Mohammed Rafi
"Zindagi Guzaarne Ko"	Mohammed Rafi
