= O. P. Nayyar =

Indian film music composer and singer-songwriter (1926–2007)

O.P.Nayyar
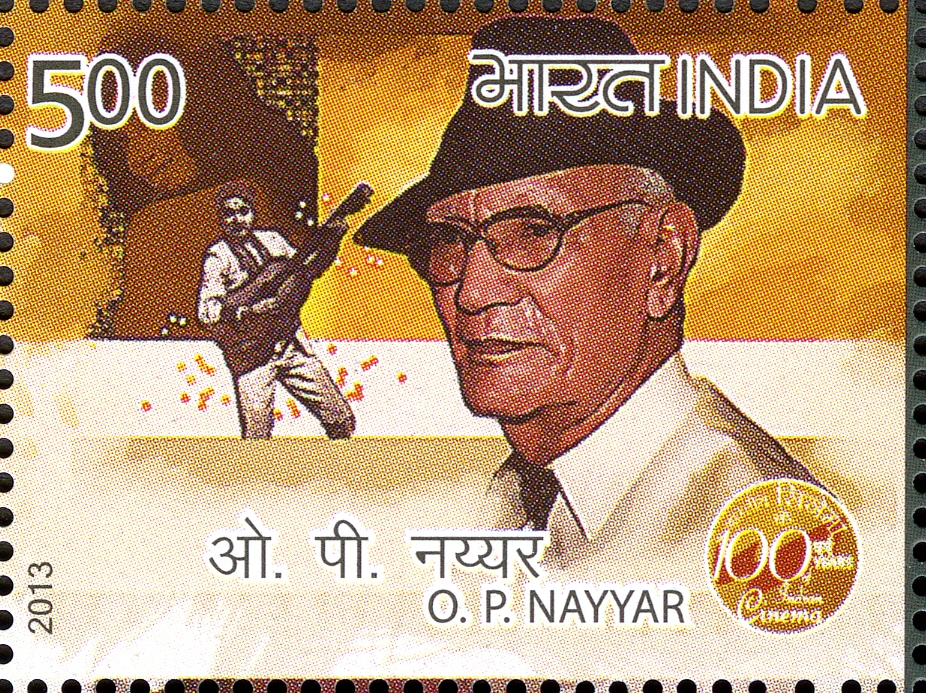
- Nayyar on a stamp of India

Background information
- Born: Omkar Prasad Nayyar; 16 January 1926; Lahore, Punjab, British India
- Died: 28 January 2007 (aged 81) Mumbai, Maharashtra, India
- Genre: Film score
- Occupations: Singer, record producer, music director
- Instruments: Piano, dholak, keyboard, drums
- Years active: 1951–1994

Omkar Prasad Nayyar (16 January 1926 – 28 January 2007) was an Indian film music composer, singer-songwriter, music producer, and musician. He is considered as one of the most rhythmic and melodious music directors of the Indian cinema. He won Filmfare Award for Best Music Director for Naya Daur in 1958. Nayyar worked extensively with singers Geeta Dutt, Asha Bhosle and Mohammed Rafi. He also worked with Kishore Kumar in the films like Baap Re Baap (1955) and Raagini (1958), which was one of Kumar hits in the characteristic "O. P. style".

== Early life and career ==
Nayyar was born in Lahore, British India (present Pakistan). He never received any formal music training. He composed the background score for Kaneez (1949), and 1952's Aasmaan (produced by Dalsukh M. Pancholi), was his first film as music director. Nayyar then composed music for Chham Chhama Chham (1952) and Baaz (1953). Film producer, director and actor Guru Dutt enlisted him to compose and conduct music for Aar Paar (1954), Mr. & Mrs. '55 (1955) and C.I.D. (1956). Nayyar's early work was primarily performed by Shamshad Begum, Geeta Dutt and Mohammed Rafi, with Asha Bhosle introduced in C.I.D. Nayyar never worked with Lata Mangeshkar, though her song Saari Saari Raat Teri Yaad Satayein from the 1958 film Aji Bas Shukriya was used in the 1973 Hindi film Taxi Driver, for which he was the music director. (Note: Contrary to popular perception, it was never due to any animosity between the two. In an interview, Lata Mangeshkar clarified, that she and O.P. Nayyar had no problem whatsoever. Nayyar believed that despite Lata being an excellent singer, his style could be better rendered by Asha Bhonsle or Geeta Dutt. Lata confirmed further that she agreed with that view. This goes well with the fact that her song Saari Saari Raat Teri Yaad Satayein was used by Nayyar Saheb.)

In 1957 Filmalaya introduced Nasir Hussain, who wanted a composer to provide romantic scores for newcomers Shammi Kapoor and Ameeta. Nayyar's scores were featured in the Hussain films Tumsa Nahin Dekha (1957) and Phir Wohi Dil Laya Hoon (1964).

According to music and film expert Rajesh Subramanian, "Aap Ke Haseen Rukh" (from Baharen Phir Bhi Aayengi) was planned with full orchestration but many of the musicians were late for the recording. After a disagreement with Mohammed Rafi, Nayyar began working with singer Mahendra Kapoor. Kapoor performed Nayyar's song "Badal Jaaye Agar Maali, Chaman Hotaa Nahi Khaali" in Bahaaren Phir Bhi Aayengi. Based on a Bengali language song Ekla Chalo Re by Rabindranath Tagore, Nayyar composed "Chal Akelaa, Chal Akelaa" (sung by Mukesh in 1969 film Sambandh).

Nayyar worked with Shamshad Begum (including "Kajra Mohabbatwala"), and after Madhubala's 1969 death Vyjayanthimala, Sadhana, Mala Sinha, Padmini, Asha Parekh and Sharmila Tagore lip-synced several Nayyar-Bhosle songs. Nayyar and Bhosle parted ways in 1974, and he then worked with Dilraj Kaur, Krishna Kalle, Vani Jayaram and Kavita Krishanmurthy. Majrooh Sultanpuri and Sahir Ludhianvi wrote the lyrics for some of Nayyar's earlier songs, including "Naya Daur". Nayyar also worked with developing lyricists such as Jan Nisar Akhtar, Qamar Jalalabadi, S. H. Bihari and Ahmed Wasi. He began the tradition of assigning full, three-minute songs to comedians. Om Prakash sang Nayyar's "Churi Bane Kanta Bane" in Jaali Note and Eent ki dukhi paan ka ikka in Howrah Bridge and Johnny Walker sang "Aye Dil Hai Mushkil Jeena Yahaan" in CID, "Jaane Kahan Mera Jigar Gaya Jee" in Mr. & Mrs. 55, "Main Bambaika Baaboo, Naam Meraa Anjaanaa" in Naya Daur and "Bajewala" in Basant.

In addition to songs for Asha Bhosle and Geeta Dutt's, Thandi Thandi Hawaa, Nayyar composed "Yeh Desh Hai Veer Jawaanonkaa" (featuring Dilip Kumar and Ajit) for Naya Daur (1957). The song earned him the 1958 Filmfare Best Music Director Award. Pran Jaye Par Vachan Na Jaye (1974) (starring Sunil Dutt and Rekha) marked as last Nayyar's hit. The songs performed by Bhosle were "Ek Tu Hai Piya", "Dekho Are Dilbar", "Chain Se Humko Kabhi". "Chain Se Humko Kabhi" wasn't present in the film but won Bhosle the Filmfare Award for Best Female Playback Singer. Afterwards, Nayyar was less active in the 1970s and did not compose music for younger actors such as Rajesh Khanna and Amitabh Bachchan. His films included Dilip Kumar, Raj Kapoor, Dev Anand, Guru Dutt, Dharmendra, Shammi Kapoor, Sunil Dutt, Joy Mukherjee, Biswajit, Feroz Khan, Bharat Bhushan, Madhubala, Asha Parekh, Sadhana, Mumtaz, Sharmila Tagore, Rajshree, Rekha, Ameeta and Shyama. In addition to Hindi films, Nayyar composed for Neerajanam 1989 film in Telugu. He made a brief comeback during the 1990s with Mangni and Nishchay in 1992 and Zid in 1994. O.P. Nayyar played a major part in shaping up Asha's career, but Asha rarely mentions it. She mentions S. D. Burman's name instead. Why OP and Asha parted away in 1974, neither of them ever talked about it.

== Personal life ==
He had three brothers: Elder brother colonel G. P. Nayyar (a retired army dentist in Secunderabad who died in 2010), then Dr. H.P. Nayyar (a physician, who died in 2005) the younger one is P. P. Nayyar (a physician, who was kidnapped in Australia since then he is missing). O. P. Nayyar's wife, Saroj Nayyar was a stage dancer before marriage and she came in touch with O. P. Nayyar at Lahore Radio Station at that time he was a singer at that station, Saroj Nayyar wrote the lyrics to "Preetam Aan Milo" (originally sung by C. H. Atma in 1945 which was used later in the film Mr. & Mrs. '55 by Geeta Dutt). They had daughters Sonia, Annapoorna, Laxmi and son Ashish. Niharica Raizada an actress from Luxembourg, is his brother's granddaughter.

He is reported to have had an affair with Asha Bhosle. They broke up in 1972. His last song sung by Asha Bhosle was "Chain se hum ko kabhi aap ne jeene na diyaa", for the movie Pran Jaye Par Vachan Na Jaye in 1974. The song was never included in the movie, however Asha won the Filmfare Best Singer award of 1974 for the same song. Asha did not go to the awards function, but O. P. Nayyar accepted the award for her. On his way home, he threw away the award.

Estranged from his family, Nayyar had moved out of his Churchgate Mumbai home in 1979, first staying in a hotel and then staying with Madhuri Joglekar, a singer, in Virar from 1989 and then as a paying guest in Thane with Rani Nakhwa and her family. He requested that his family be barred from his funeral. He died on 28 January 2007 following a heart attack.

None of his family members or the Bollywood figures attended his last rites at the civic crematorium in Thane.

He was survived by his estranged family, wife, three daughters and a son. Nayyar's death was followed by tributes from many Bollywood figures, including Lata Mangeshkar, Sharmila Tagore, Mumtaz, Mahesh Bhatt, Khayyam, Shakti Samanta, Sonu Nigam, Ravindra Jain, Anu Malik, B. R. Chopra and Shammi Kapoor. A commemorative stamp was issued by India Post on 3 May 2013. His granddaughter Niharica Raizada is also an actress.

== Filmography ==
- Aasman (1952)
- Chham Chhama Chham (1952)
- Baaz (1953)
- Aar Paar (1954)
- Mangu (1954)
- Mehbooba (1954)
- Mr. & Mrs. '55 (1955)
- Baap Re Baap (1955)
- Miss Coca Cola (1955)
- Musafir Khana (1955)
- Sabse Bada Rupaiya (1955)
- Bhagam Bhag (1956)
- Chhoo Mantar (1956)
- C.I.D. (1956)
- Dhake Ki Malmal (1956)
- Ham Sab Chor Hain (1956)
- Mr. Lambu (1956)
- Naya Andaz (1956)
- Shrimati 420 (1956)
- Bare Sarkar (1957)
- Qaidi (1957)
- Ustad (1957)
- Johnny Walker (1957)
- Duniya Rang Rangeeli (1957)
- Mai Baap (1957)
- Naya Daur (1957)
- Tumsa Nahin Dekha (1957)
- 12 O'Clock (1958)
- Farishta (1958)
- Howrah Bridge (1958)
- Kabhi Andhera Kabhi Ujala (1958)
- Mr. Cartoon M. A. (1958)
- Mujrim (1958)
- Phagun (1958)
- Raagini (1958)
- Sone Ki Chidiya (1958)
- Do Ustad (1959)
- Jaali Note (1960)
- Kalpana (1960)
- Basant (1960)
- Mitti Mein Sona (1960)
- Hong Kong (1962)
- Ek Musafir Ek Hasina (1962)
- Phir Wohi Dil Laya Hoon (1963)
- Kashmir Ki Kali (1964)
- Mere Sanam (1965)
- Akalmand (1966)
- Baharen Phir Bhi Aayengi (1966)
- Do Dilon Ki Dastan (1966)
- Love and Murder (1966)
- Mohabbat Zindagi Hai (1966)
- Sawan Ki Ghata (1966)
- Yeh Raat Phir Na Aaygi (1966)
- C.I.D. 909 (1967)
- Nasihat (1967)
- Humsaya (1968)
- Dil Aur Mohabbat (1968)
- Kahin Din Kahin Raat (1968)
- Kismat (1968)
- Shrimanji (1968)
- Sambandh (1969)
- The Killers (1969)
- Aisa Bhi Hota Hai (1971)
- Ek Bar Muskura Do (1972)
- Taxi Driver (1973)
- Pran Jaye Par Vachan Na Jaye (1974)
- Khoon Ka Badla Khoon (1978)
- Heera Moti (1979)
- Bin Maa Ke Bachche (1980)
- Muqaddar Ki Baat (1983) (Unreleased)
- Salaam Bombay! (1988)
- Neerajanam (1989) (Telugu Film)
- Mangni (1992)
- Nishchaiy (1992)
- Zid (1994)

== Albums ==
- The Best Of O. P. Nayyar Vol. 1 to Vol. 6
- Parichay – Introduction To India's Musical Geniuses (O. P. Nayyar)|Parichay – Introduction To India's Musical Geniuses
- OP Nayyar-Penaz Masani – Dekho Mohabbat Ka Dastoor
- OP Nayyar-Runa Laila - Presents The Loves (1984)
- OP Nayyar-Penaz Masani – Jaane Do (1990)
- OP Nayyar-Ashok Khosla – Naye Kapde Badlkar
- OP Nayyar-Ashok Khosla – Ajnabi Shehar Mein
- OP Nayyar-Runa Laila – Allah Ne Is Dil Ne
- OP Nayyar-Runa Laila – Kehdo Is Raat Se
- OP Nayyar-Runa Laila – Wadiyan Wadiyan
- Golden Collection – O. P. Nayyar (compilation)
- O. P. Nayyar, Asha Bhosle – Sunheri Yaadein
