= Raagini (film) =

- Directed by: Rakhan
- Starring: Ashok Kumar; Kishore Kumar; Padmini
- Music by: O. P. Nayyar
- Release date: 1958
- Country: India
- Language: Hindi

Raagini is a 1958 Indian Hindi-language film directed by Rakhan. The film centres on a love triangle between characters played by Ashok Kumar, Kishore Kumar, and Padmini. The film also features a teenage Vinod Mehra as the young version of Kishore's character. Its soundtrack was composed by O. P. Nayyar.

The film premiered at Super Cinema, Bombay, on 30 May 1958. A Times of India review read, "Haunting Music, Good Acting Enliven Raagini".

Kishore Kumar regarded Raagini as one of his finest acting performances besides Bandi (1957).
