= Jnanadabhiram Barua =

Indian writer and dramatist (1880–1955)

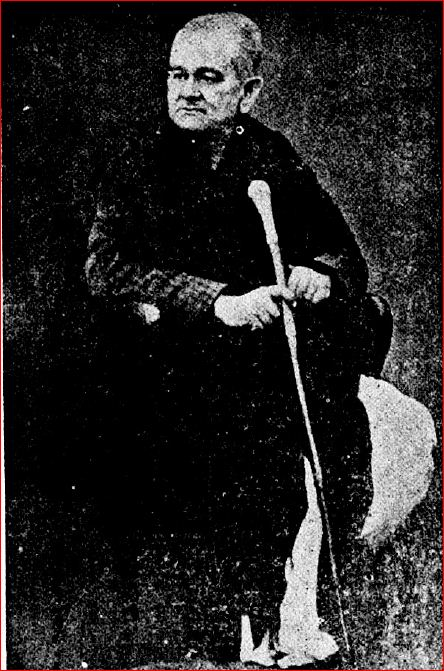
- Born: 1880
- Died: 1955 (aged 74–75)
- Occupations: Writer; dramatist; teacher; barrister
- Spouse: Latika Tagore
- Children: 1
- Relatives: Sharmila Tagore (granddaughter)
- Writing career
- Language: Assamese

Jnanadabhiram Barua (1880-1955) was a notable Indian Assamese language writer, dramatist, translator, and barrister from Assam. He also participated in India's freedom struggle.

== Early life and education ==
He was born to Gunabhiram Barua and Bishnupriya Devi in 1880. He received his early education in Nagaon. Thereafter he went to Calcutta and London for further education. He became barrister and was appointed as the first principal of BRM Government Law College in Assam.

== Literacy works ==
Some of his works include Venishor Saud, Pancharatna, Dodair poja, and Bialator Sithi (Letters from Abroad). Mor Katha is his autobiographical book. He was the president of the Asam Sahitya Sabha in 1933 held at North Lakhimpur, Assam. He translated Laxminath Bezbarua's Burhi aair xadhu into English.

== Personal life ==
He was married to Latika Tagore. Barua's daughter Ira Barua married Gitindranath Tagore and their eldest daughter is noted Indian film actress Sharmila Tagore and married to then Captain of Indian Cricket team and Nawab of Pataudi Mansoor Ali Khan Pataudi.

== See also ==
- Assamese literature
- History of Assamese literature
- List of Asam Sahitya Sabha presidents
- List of Assamese writers with their pen names
