= IFFI Best Actor Award (Female) =

Best actor (female) award in Indian film festival

Silver Peacock Best Actor Award (Female)
- International award for contributions to World Cinema
- Awarded for: Best Performance by an Actor
- Sponsored by: Directorate of Film Festivals
- Reward: Silver Peacock Award
- First award: 1965
- Final award: 2025
- Most recent winner: Jara Sofija Ostan

Highlights
- Total awarded: 27
- First winner: Sharmila Tagore

The IFFI Award for Best Actress (officially known as the Silver Peacock for the Best Actor Award (Female)) is an honor that has been presented annually at the International Film Festival of India since 2010 to an actress for performance in a leading role in World cinema. Earlier the award was presented on various occasions at the 3rd IFFI for ensemble cast in "Nirjan Saikate", and Brazilian actress Fernanda Torres at 11th IFFI.

== List of award winners ==
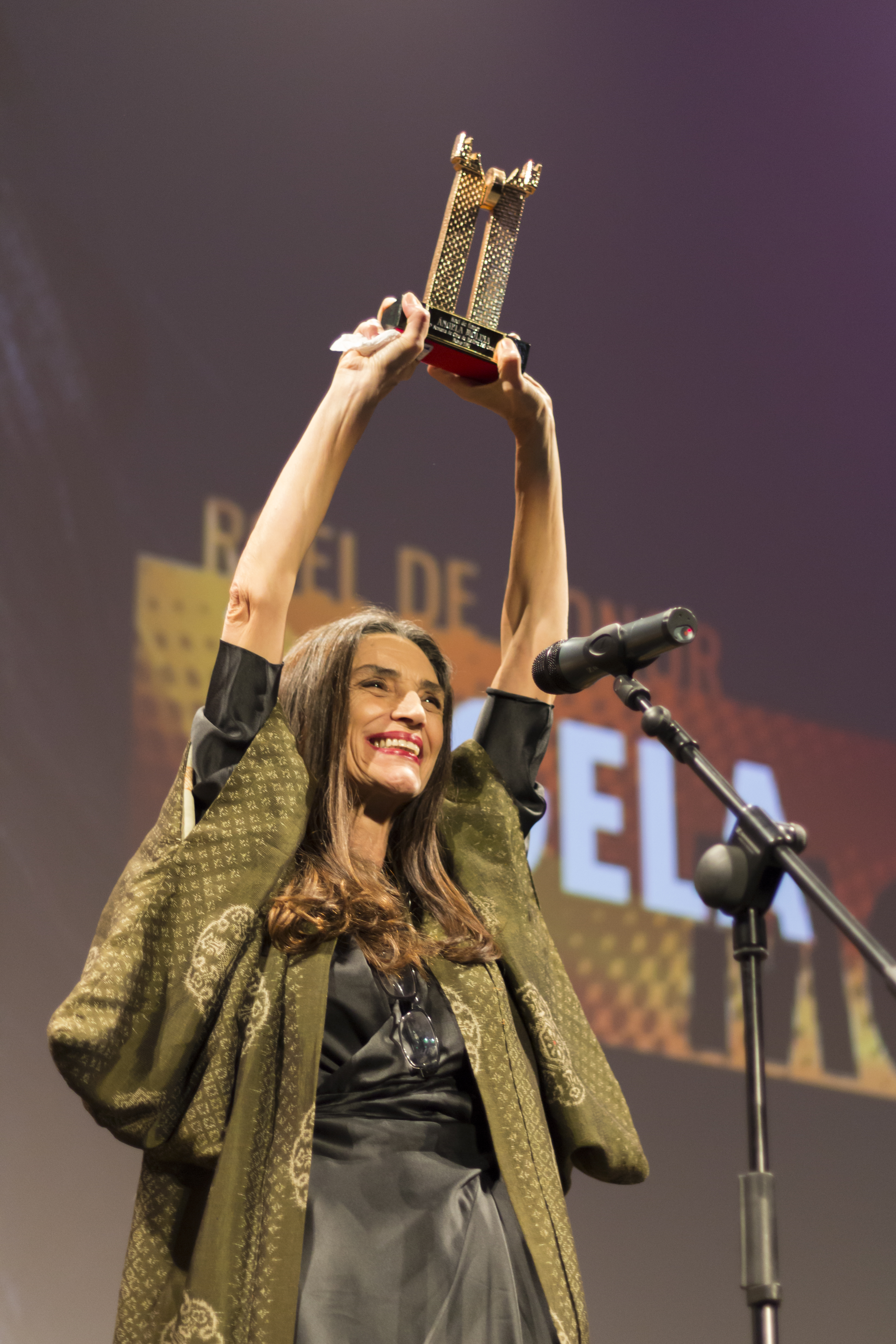
Ángela Molina, 2021 award winner

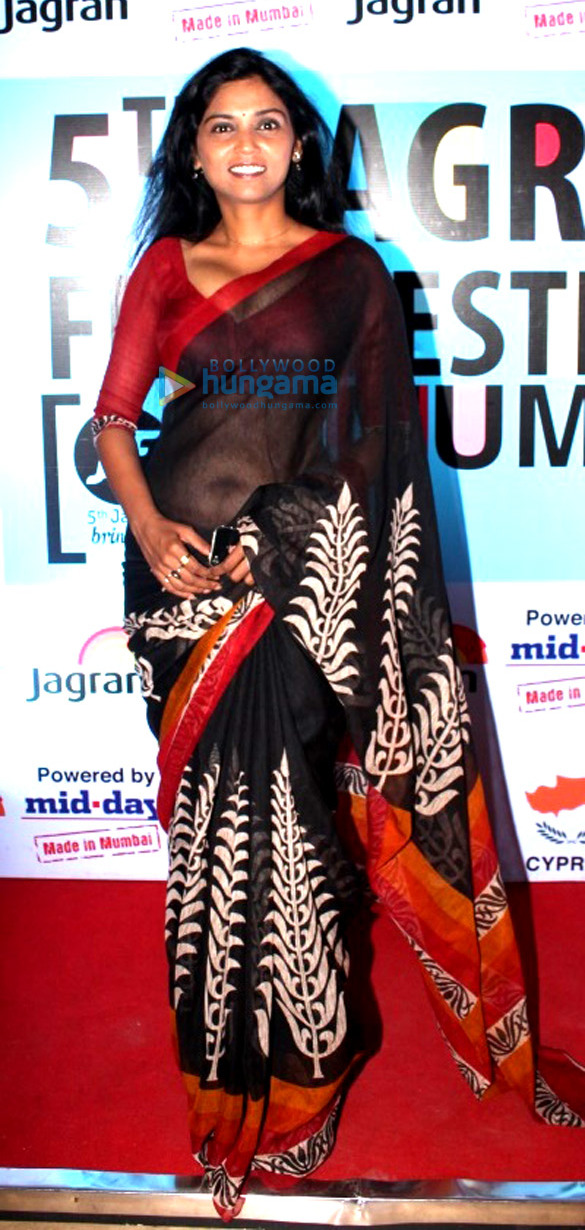
Usha Jadhav, 2019 award winner

List of award recipients, showing the year, film(s), language(s) and Country
Year	Recipient(s)	Work(s)	Language(s)	Country	Ref.
1965 (3rd)	Sharmila Tagore Ruma Guha Thakurta Chhaya Debi Renuka Debi Bharati Debi	"Nirjan Saikate"	Bengali	India	
1987 (11th)	Fernanda Torres	"Love Me Forever or Never"	Brazilian	Brazil	
2010 (41st)	Magdalena Boczarska	"Little Rose"	Polish	Poland	
2011 (42nd)	Nadezhda Markina	"Elena"	Russian	Russia	
2012 (43rd)	Anjali Patil	"Oba Nathuwa Oba Ekka"	Sinhala	India	
2013 (44th)	Magdalena Boczarska	"In Hiding"	Polish	Poland	
2014 (45th)	Alina Rodriguez Sarit Larry	"Behavior" "The Kindergarten Teacher"	Spanish; Hebrew	Spain	
2015 (46th)	Gunes Sensoy Doga Doguslu Tugba Sunguroglu Elit İşcan İlayda Akdoğan	"Mustang"	Turkish	Turkey	
2016 (47th)	Elina Vaska	"Mellow Mud"	Latvian	Latvia	
2017 (48th)	Parvathy Thiruvothu	"Take Off"	Malayalam	India	
2018 (49th)	Anastasiia Pustovit	"When the Trees Fall"	Ukrainian	Ukraine	
2019 (50th)	Usha Jadhav	"Mai Ghat: Crime No 103/2015"	Marathi	India	
2020 (51st)	Zofia Stafiej	I Never Cry	Polish	Poland	
2021 (52nd)	Ángela Molina	Charlotte	Spanish	Spain	
2022 (53rd)	Daniela Marin Navarro	I Have Electric Dreams	Spanish	Poland	
2023 (54th)	Mélanie Thierry	Party of Fools	French	France	
2024 (55th)	Vesta Matulyte and Vilma Raubaitė	Toxic	Lithuanian	Lithuania	
2025 (56th)	Jara Sofija Ostan	Little Trouble Girls	Sloven	Slovenia	
