= Nirjan Saikate =

- English: The Desolate Beach
- Directed by: Tapan Sinha
- Starring: Anil Chatterjee; Sharmila Tagore; Chhaya Devi; Ruma Guha Thakurta; Renuka Devi; Bharati Devi
- Release date: 1963
- Running time: 130 minutes
- Country: India
- Language: Bengali

Nirjan Saikate (Bengali: নির্জন সৈকতে) (English subtitle: The Desolate Beach) is a Bengali film directed by Tapan Sinha. It was released in 1963. This movie is an adaptation of the novel by the same name from eminent Bengali writer Samaresh Basu, who wrote this travelogue under his pen name 'Kalkut'. The film won the Silver Peacock - Best Feature Film at the 3rd IFFI.

== Plot ==
The writer is himself the protagonist. He is on his way to Puri by train. In the course of the journey he gets acquainted with a group of 4 Bengali widows accompanying their niece, also going to Puri. The writer was going to just get out of his day to day Kolkata life whereas these ladies were actually going to calm down their niece who had just suffered a breakup with her lover. The rest of the story revolves around these people and their attraction and involvement with the writer. The writer is amused with them and for his part tries to calm the girl. The story guides us around the different relationships the writer develops with each of the character he meets. The movie tries to show the social taboos for widows and teaches the philosophy that life is ahead of us and not behind. There is a pretty good description of Puri, Konark and Rambha. At the time this movie was shot it was possible for Tapan Sinha to shoot inside the Konark sun temple, also the bullock cart way to Konark is an extra for the viewer.

== Cast ==
- Anil Chatterjee as the protagonist -the writer
- Sharmila Tagore as the Niece Renu
- Chhaya Devi as Sejdi
- Ruma Guha Thakurta as Choto bou
- Renuka Devi as Obu
- Bharati Devi as Sibi the 4 widows.
- Minati Mishra as Odissi Dancer.
- Rabi Ghosh as a Panda of Puri
- Jahar Ganguly as the Hotel Owner.
- Nripati Chattopadhyay
- Pahari Sanyal

== Awards ==
- The leading 4 ladies of this film - the 4 widows, shared the IFFI Best Actor Award (Female) in 1965 at the 3rd IFFI.
- Audience Award, Sydney Film Festival.
- Silver Peacock - Best Feature Film at the 3rd IFFI.
