= Sawan Ki Ghata =

- Poster
- Directed by: Shakti Samanta
- Story by: Gulshan Nanda
- Produced by: Shakti Samanta
- Starring: Manoj Kumar; Sharmila Tagore; Mumtaz
- Music by: O. P. Nayyar
- Release date: 1966
- Country: India
- Language: Hindi

Sawan Ki Ghata (lit. 'Monsoon cloud') is a 1966 Bollywood musical romance produced and directed by Shakti Samanta. It stars Manoj Kumar, Sharmila Tagore, Mumtaz in lead roles, along with Pran, Jeevan, Madan Puri in other important roles. The music was composed by O. P. Nayyar. The film was the 8th highest-grossing film of the year.

== Plot ==
The film starts with a car accident in a hilly region. Due to a brake failure, a car falls and the driver dies soon. In that car, there was a child and a suitcase full of rupees and jewellery. Two poor local labour Bansilal and Shamsher sees the whole incident. Shamsher loots the suitcase and wants to kill the child as he wants no other would be aware of the incident, but Bansilal saves the child and starts taking care of the child, he names him Gopal. After some years, Gopal is now a school going boy and fond of his pet horse. He is in friendship relation with Seema, the only daughter of Shamsher, who now calls himself Rana. This angers Rana and he warns Bansilal to send Gopal to another city, which he does. When Gopal becomes adult, he wants to visit his father and goes to the village. After reaching there he doesn't locate anything about his father, but meets with a stranger. Who is he? What he wants?

== Cast ==
- Manoj Kumar as Gopal
- Sharmila Tagore as Seema
- Mumtaz as Saloni
- Pran as Kailash Chaudhary
- Jeevan as Rana Shamsher
- Madan Puri as Limo
- Padma Khanna as Bela
- Jeevankala as Chameli
- Sunder as Rasila Lal
- Sajjan as Bansilal
- S. N. Banerjee as William
- Mridula Rani as Mrs. Tarakeshwar Chaudhary
- Madhumati as Courtesan
- Master Anwar as Young Gopal
- Kaveeta Oberoi Kaul as Young Seema
- Mauji Singh as truck driver
- Mohan Choti as Buddhuram
- Kedarnath Saigal as Inspector
- Kundan as Inspector
- Ratan Gaurang as Guard
- Neelam as Bindu

== Music ==
The songs are composed by O. P. Nayyar and the lyrics are penned by S. H. Bihari. The soundtrack has 8 songs. Playback singers Asha Bhosle, Mohammed Rafi, Usha Mangeshkar and Mahendra Kapoor have lent their voices for the songs of the film. Director Shakti Samanta visited O. P. Nayyar and finalised 12 tunes for Kashmir Ki Kali and he used the remaining tunes for this film.

Song	Singer
"Zulfon Ko Hata Le"	Mohammed Rafi
"Honton Pe Hansi, Aankhon Mein Nasha, Pehchan Hai"	Mohammed Rafi, Asha Bhosle
"Khuda Huzoor Ko Bhi Meri Zindagi De De"	Usha Mangeshkar, Asha Bhosle,
"Aaj Koi Pyar Se"	Asha Bhosle
"Zara Haule Haule Chalo"	Asha Bhosle
"Jo Dil Ki Tadap Na Jane"	Asha Bhosle
"Meri Jaan Tum Pe Sadke"	Asha Bhosle
"Meri Jaan Tum Pe Sadke"	Mahendra Kapoor
