= Anari (1975 film) =

1975 film

- Directed by: Asit Sen
- Produced by: Satish Bhatia; Inder Kapoor
- Starring: Shashi Kapoor; Sharmila Tagore; Moushumi Chatterjee; Kabir Bedi; Kader Khan
- Music by: Laxmikant–Pyarelal
- Release date: 17 January 1975
- Country: India
- Language: Hindi

Anari is a 1975 Hindi-language romance film directed by Asit Sen. The film stars Shashi Kapoor and Sharmila Tagore, who made several films together throughout the 1970s and 1980s. Their co-stars include Moushumi Chatterjee, Kabir Bedi and Kader Khan.

== Plot ==
Raj (Shashi Kapoor) and Poonam (Sharmila Tagore) are sweethearts cursed with extreme poverty. Raj must provide for his family, and arrange for his sister's marriage. Poonam fights for pennies to nurse her ailing mother, while her father drinks away his earnings. A job offer takes Raj away into a world of wealth and intrigue, but creates a situation where both parties lose their moral compass.

== Cast ==
- Shashi Kapoor as Raj
- Sharmila Tagore as Poonam
- Moushumi Chatterjee as Rashmi
- Kabir Bedi
- Kader Khan
- Utpal Dutt
- Dina Pathak
- Asit Sen as Asit Sen
- Birbal (actor)

== Music ==
The film's music was composed by Laxmikant–Pyarelal, and Majrooh Sultanpuri wrote the lyrics for the songs. Playback singers include Asha Bhosle, Kishore Kumar, Lata Mangeshkar, Mehmood and Mohammed Rafi.

=== Track List ===
No.	Title	Singer	Length
1.	"Hame Kya Garz Log Kya Maante Hain"	Kishore Kumar, Asha Bhosle
2.	"Hum To Ek Anari"	Kishore Kumar, Mehmood
3.	"Tere Bagair Jaane Jaana Sochta Hoon Yehi Mein Deewaana"	Kishore Kumar
4.	"Hum To Jis Raah Pe Jaate Hain"	Mohammed Rafi, Lata Mangeshkar
5.	"Thandi Pavan Hai Deewaani Chhine Dupatta Mera"	Asha Bhosle
