= Aamne Samne (1967 film) =

- Directed by: Suraj Prakash
- Produced by: Suraj Prakash
- Starring: Shashi Kapoor; Sharmila Tagore; Prem Chopra
- Edited by: Suraj Prakash
- Music by: Kalyanji Anandji
- Release date: 1967
- Country: India
- Language: Hindi
- Box office: ₹1.7 crore (equivalent to ₹99 crore or US$10 million in 2026)

Aamne Samne (transl. Face to face) is a 1967 Hindi mystery film produced and directed by Suraj Prakash. The film stars Shashi Kapoor, Sharmila Tagore, Prem Chopra, Rajindernath and Madan Puri. The film's music is by Kalyanji Anandji.

== Plot ==
Deepak Verma (Shashi Kapoor) is on trial for the murder of his wealthy wife Vimla, but is acquitted and set free. Deepak gets possession of all his wife's wealth and sets out for Bombay and starts a new life under the alias Gopal Mittal. Sapna (Sharmila Tagore) is his wealthy neighbor who finds Gopal annoying and believes that Gopal is stalking her. Soon, Sapna falls for Gopal's charms, though her brother Pran (Madan Puri) wants Sapna to marry Prem (Prem Chopra). Sapna tells Prem and Pran that she is choosing Gopal, which enrages them and they both threaten to kill her. Sapna and Gopal get married and while honeymooning, an attempt is made on Sapna's life. Soon, Sapna learns that Gopal's real name is Deepak, who was previously accused of murdering his first wife. Gopal's ever-changing behavior throws everyone into suspicion and Sapna fears she will be his next victim. Is Gopal innocent or Guilty? Who is spinning the web of lies and deceit and who will survive the murderer's cruel intentions?

== Cast ==
- Shashi Kapoor as Deepak Verma / Gopal Mittal
- Sharmila Tagore as Sapna Mathur / Sapna G. Mittal
- Prem Chopra as Prem Malhotra
- Madan Puri as Pran Mathur, Sapna's brother
- Kamal Kapoor as Inspector Varma
- Rajendra Nath as Shubodh Mukherjee
- Shammi as Itabai Mukherji, Shubodh's wife
- Karan Dewan as Jeeva
- Bhalla as Chander – Malhotra's servant

== Soundtrack ==
#	Title	Singer(s)
1	"Mere Bechain Dil Ko Chain"	Mohammed Rafi
2	"Nain Mila Kar Chain Churana"	Mohammed Rafi
3	"Aajkal Hamse Roothe Hue Hai Sanam"	Mohammed Rafi
4	"Ankhiyan Na Churao Balma"	Manna Dey, Miss Shammi
5	"Kabhi Raat Din Hum Door The"	Mohammed Rafi, Lata Mangeshkar
