= Do Aur Do Paanch =

- Directed by: Rakesh Kumar
- Written by: Sachin Bhowmick; Kader Khan (dialogue)
- Produced by: Sandow M. M. A. Chinnappa Thevar (presenter); C. Dhandyadupani
- Starring: Shashi Kapoor; Amitabh Bachchan; Hema Malini; Parveen Babi; Kader Khan; Shreeram Lagoo; Om Prakash
- Music by: Rajesh Roshan
- Production company: Devar Films
- Release date: 10 February 1980
- Country: India
- Language: Hindi

Do Aur Do Paanch (transl. Two and two make five) is a 1980 Indian Hindi-language action comedy film produced by Devar Films and directed by Rakesh Kumar. The film stars Shashi Kapoor, Amitabh Bachchan, Hema Malini and Parveen Babi.

In the film, two burglars are hired as teachers in a school. Their purpose is to kidnap a specific student to further the schemes of their respective bosses. They lose interest in the scheme as they develop genuine affection for the boy, and while they pursue romantic relationships with two female co-workers.

== Plot ==
Vijay and Sunil are petty burglars. They are sworn enemies. Their respective bosses command them to go to a school where their task is to abduct rich man Seth Mathur's son, Bittoo and bring him in so as to demand a huge ransom. Vijay and Sunil fake their identities and join the school as Ram and Lakshman, respectively. Ram is appointed as a P.E. instructor while Lakshman is made the music teacher. On their journey towards the task, Ram meets Anju the principal's daughter while Lakshman meets Shalu the dance teacher. Both the ladies, unaware of their background and motive, fall in love.

Vijay and Sunil get close to Bittoo so as to lure him but as days pass by, both of them realize their true affection for that boy and drop their plan of abducting him. Meanwhile, Anju and Shalu come to know of their lovers' true identity and by their word of love and affection change them for good. Sunil's boss Uncle Jagdish loses hope on him and he himself comes up with a plan and abducts the boy. Vijay and Sunil join hands to save the boy from Uncle Jagdish and rescue him with Uncle Jagdish and his henchmen being arrested by the police eventually.

== Cast ==
- Shashi Kapoor as Sunil/Lakshman
- Amitabh Bachchan as Vijay/Ram
- Hema Malini as Shalu
- Parveen Babi as Anju Sharma
- Sajjan as Principal Om Prakash Sharma
- Shreeram Lagoo as Seth SK Mathur
- Kader Khan as Uncle Jagdish
- Om Prakash as Prisoner (Guest appearance)
- Yunus Parvez as a Real Music teacher Saxena
- Lalita Pawar as Sarojini, Sunil's mother
- Mohan Sherry as a Security guard Sher Khan
- Ram Sethi as Pyarelal
- Goga Kapoor as Jagdish,a goon, who plays the role of Lion in Stage during the Song Prem Se Humko Jeene Do

== Production ==
The film's intro was a cartoon sketch, with Amitabh Bachchan and Shashi Kapoor characters trying to steal and was very fondly received by viewers.

Film is fondly remembered for the comedy scenes between the main two stars.

This is one of the 17 films in which Bachchan plays the character of Vijay.

== Soundtrack ==
All songs were composed by Rajesh Roshan and penned by Anjaan.

#	Title	Singer(s)
1	"Tune Abhi Dekha Nahin"	Kishore Kumar
2	"Meri Zindagi Ne Mujhpe"	Kishore Kumar
3	"Prem Se Humko Jeene Do"	Kishore Kumar, Amit Kumar, Mehmood, Lata Mangeshkar
4	"Soti Hai Yeh Raat Sone Do"	Kishore Kumar, Anuradha Paudwal
5	"Yeh Zulfon Ki Bikhri Ghata"	Asha Bhosle
6	"Tune Abhi Dekha Nahin"	Rajesh Roshan
