= Paap Aur Punya =

- Directed by: Prayag Raj
- Produced by: Shyam Sunder Shivdasani
- Starring: Shashi Kapoor; Sharmila Tagore; Ajit; Indrani Mukherjee
- Music by: Kalyanji Anandji
- Release date: 1 June 1974
- Country: India

Paap Aur Punya (transl. Sin and Virtue) is a Bollywood drama film directed by Prayag Raj. The film stars Shashi Kapoor, Sharmila Tagore and Ajit. Shashi Kapoor also appears in dual role. The film was a success at box office

== Plot ==
Fair-minded Raja Gajraj Singh is overthrown in a coup by his brother, Balbir Singh. Both Gajraj's and Balbir's wives are pregnant, and give birth to twin sons, and a son respectively. Balbir orders that Gajraj's son be killed. Then he arranges for Gajraj and his wife's accidental death by a motor vehicle. Years go by, most people have forgotten Raja Gajraj, and Balbir is the sole acclaimed ruler with his fair-minded and soft-spoken son, Ganga Singh, who is all set to succeed the throne from his dad. Then Ganga meets a young woman named Jugni from a poor family and falls in love with her, she too falls in love with him, and both want to get married. But Balbir will not have anything to do with her, as he would like Ganga to marry rich and wealthy Mala. Chaos and anarchy suddenly descend upon the palace, when Ganga undergoes a character change and becomes womanizing, alcoholic, and foul-mouthed, much to the chagrin of his dad. But the clouds do have a silver lining for Ganga is now willing to wed Mala. What was the reason behind the sudden change in Ganga? What will the poor heart-broken Jugni do now?

== Cast ==
- Shashi Kapoor as Ganga Singh / Jwala Singh
- Sharmila Tagore as Jugni
- Ajit as Balbir Singh
- Asrani as Palace Official
- Aruna Irani as Mala
- Achala Sachdev as Ganga's mom
- Sapru as Raja Gajraj Singh
- Manik Irani
- Moolchand as Salim
- Jagdish Raj as Police Inspector
- Pinchoo Kapoor as Tiger
- Roopesh Kumar as Marqas- Tiger's associate
- Gurcharan Pohli as Shera- Tiger's associate
- Indrani Mukherjee
- Krishan Dhawan as Inspector Rana
- Kunal Kapoor as Young Ganga / Jwala Singh
- Ramesh Goyal as Inspector Rana
- Baby Guddu as Pinky
- Margaret Bhatty as Indian Airlines Cabin Crew

== Production ==
During the filming of a scene, one of the actors who played the villain was bitten by Tagore's then two-year-old son, Saif, who thought Shashi Kapoor was being attacked for real.

== Songs ==
- Bolo Baadal Ki Mehbooba Kaun Hain - Kishore Kumar, Lata Mangeshkar
- O Rang Rasiya Re Main Toh Shaam Se Baithi Thi - Kanchan
- Main Hoon Jodhpur Ki Jugni - Lata Mangeshkar
- Tere Mere Pyaar Ki Bandh Gayi Jab Yeh Dor -Mukesh, Kanchan
