= Suhana Safar =

1970 Indian film

- Directed by: Vijay
- Starring: Shashi Kapoor; Sharmila Tagore
- Music by: Laxmikant–Pyarelal
- Release date: 6 June 1970
- Country: India
- Language: Hindi

Suhana Safar is a 1970 Indian Hindi-language drama film directed by Vijay. The film stars Shashi Kapoor and Sharmila Tagore.

== Plot ==
Sapna (Sharmila Tagore), flying back to India from the USA is involved in an airplane engine "flameout". She loves poetry, in particular the work of a poet called Ujjwala. Unable to distinguish between the poet and the poetry, she sets out on a journey to meet the poet in a place called Phulwari. Sapna believes that Ujjwala is her dream man.

Her wealthy father, worried by her distraction consults a psychiatrist who pronounces that Sapna needs treatment and must be sent to his clinic for an extended period of time. Running away from home, in a beautiful red MG TF (probably a 1954 model) she comes across Sunil (Shashi Kapoor) working on his Jeep (one of the early right-hand drive versions that Mahindras produced).

A couple of accidents later they find themselves in a luxurious Mercedes Benz tour coach (possibly an O 321 H - with a rear engine) and their journey of exploration begins. Faced with obstacles, raised by greedy people who want to get the informant's reward announced by Sapna's father Randhir Singh Chauhan; and going through some comic as well as dangerous interludes the screen couple arrive at the climax on their way to Phulwari. Sunil is doing his best to escort Sapna to Phulwari.

How Sapna reconciles her love for Ujjwala, who she has only met through his poetry and Sunil's unreciprocated love for her makes for an interesting denouement.

== Cast ==
- Shashi Kapoor as Sunil
- Sharmila Tagore as Sapna
- Om Prakash as Sapna's Father
- Lalita Pawar as Bus Passenger
- David as Bus Passenger
- Manmohan Krishna as Bus passenger
- Master Bhagwan as Bus Passenger
- Leela Mishra as Bus Passenger
- K. N. Singh as Dr. Singh
- Ramayan Tiwari as Daku Mangal Singh
- Sunder as Bus Passenger
- Randhir as Rana Randhir Singh Chauhan
- Mukri as Mukkaramjah Mknaik 'Mukri'
- Keshto Mukherjee as Keshto
- Mohan Sherry as Bus Driver

== Soundtrack ==
With Laxmikant-Pyarelal's music and Anand Bakshi's lyrics, Mohammed Rafi sang some fabulous songs for Shashi Kapoor. "Yeh Suhana Safar" & "Saari Khushiyan Hai" remained evergreen hits.

Song	Singer
"Yeh Suhana Safar" (Male)	Mohammed Rafi
"Saari Khushiyan Hai"	Mohammed Rafi
"Paise Ka Kya Yakeen"	Mohammed Rafi
"Chudiyan Bazaar Se Mangwa De Re Pehle Saiyan"	Mohammed Rafi, Asha Bhosle
"Tim Tim Chamke Re Tara"	Lata Mangeshkar
"Yeh Suhana Safar" (Female)	Suman Kalyanpur
"La Gloria" (Music)	Laxmikant-Pyarelal
