= New Delhi Times =

1986 thriller film

- Directed by: Ramesh Sharma
- Written by: Gulzar
- Produced by: P. K. Tiwari
- Starring: Shashi Kapoor; Sharmila Tagore; Om Puri; Kulbhushan Kharbanda
- Cinematography: Subrata Mitra
- Edited by: Renu Saluja
- Music by: Louis Banks
- Distributed by: P. K. Communication Pvt Ltd
- Release date: 1986
- Running time: 123 minutes
- Language: Hindi

New Delhi Times is 1986 Indian Hindi-language political thriller film directed by Ramesh Sharma and written by Gulzar, starring Shashi Kapoor, Sharmila Tagore, Om Puri and Kulbhushan Kharbanda in lead roles. The film is about a newspaper editor who exposes the politics-media corruption nexus.

The political drama film with a controversial storyline about political corruption and media, ran into trouble when film distributors and television refused to run the film, though later it went on to win three National Film Awards. These were for Shashi Kapoor, Subrata Mitra (Cinematographer), and for Best First Film Of A Director (Ramesh Sharma). It also won the Bengal Film Journalist's Association Award (1988). It remains one of few Bollywood films to tackle the issue of corruption in media, joining Kundan Shah's Jaane Bhi Do Yaaro (1983), Main Azaad Hoon (1989) and Rann (2010)

The film struggled to get a theatrical release owing to its political plot. It was not telecast on the national broadcaster and was even sued by a lawyer for a dialogue that implied that all lawyers lie. Shashi Kapoor agreed to work in the film at the signing amount of Rs 101. The shoot was delayed because of the death of his wife Jennifer Kendell and resumed months later.

== Plot ==
The film tells the story of an honest journalist, Vikas Pande, from Ghazipur in eastern Uttar Pradesh who moves to Delhi to run a newspaper and soon uncovers a political assassination, and in the process, falls prey to a corrupt system and the nexus between politicians and media barons. The film starts with the assassination of a local MLA, Bhaleram, in the circuit house of Ghazipur. The guard of the circuit house goes missing. Vikas Pande is the upright and fearless executive editor of the New Delhi Times newspaper and is in the process of exposing a scandal of illegal hooch that killed hundreds of people. Meanwhile, there is a power struggle going on between the incumbent Chief Minister Trivedi and the ambitious MLA Ajay Singh for the post of chief minister.

Ajay Singh is a dangerous man and is linked with all types of illegal activities like drug trafficking, smuggling, extortion, looting, etc. His business is managed by his trusted lieutenant Iqbal. Iqbal is arrested in the murder case of Bhaleram. He is the cause of frequent riots that are taking place in Ghazipur. Vikas goes to Ghazipur to cover the riots and meets the locals. Here, he finds overwhelming evidence that suggests Ajay Singh is somehow linked with the murder.

On the other hand, Vikas's wife, who is a lawyer, is approached by an old man whose daughter is missing from her in-laws' place, and whom they claim had gone mad. She is fighting the case.

In a tense hearing at the court, Iqbal states that he is innocent and Ajay Singh has committed the crime. This becomes the front-page news of the New Delhi Times. Ajay Singh is very anxious and summons Vikas. Vikas confronts him directly and accuses him of the murder. In a fit of rage, Ajay Singh reveals that he had bribed Bhaleram and his 13 MLAs, and his road to the chief minister's chair was almost clear. Hence, he had no motive to kill him. Ajay Singh is constantly putting the CM under pressure, yet the CM miraculously escapes every trap. Also, Vikas is threatened by goons to stop pursuing the murder case, which motivates him further.

He collates all the facts and writes an article that links Ajay Singh with the murder, but has no concrete evidence. Although reluctant to publish the article, his bosses finally concede to his demands and publish it. One fine day, the old man who had earlier approached Vikas's wife for his missing daughter comes to thank her for her efforts. It is revealed that his daughter is found at a mental asylum, where the staff and police officials were bribed to declare her mentally unfit. The old man further reveal that the guard of the circuit house is admitted to the asylum. Vikas immediately meets the guard. The guard is an old man who tells him that he is not mentally ill and reveals all the happenings of that day. On the fateful day, his son -who is in fact a mole of Trivedi - visits him. The deal does take place with Ajay Singh but once they leave, Bhaleram is murdered by goons of Trivedi.

Vikas realizes that all the evidence was planted by Trivedi to implicate Ajay Singh and keep him under control. He is sad that he has been used by Trivedi, but then his friend Anwar consoles him, saying that the person whom he has exposed deserves at least what he has done.

== Cast ==
- Shashi Kapoor - Vikas Pande
- Sharmila Tagore - Nisha
- Om Puri - Ajay Singh
- Kulbhushan Kharbanda - J.K. (Jugal Kishor)
- A.K. Hangal - Vikas's Father
- M. K. Raina
- Manohar Singh - Jagannath Poddar
- Ram Gopal Bajaj - The Minister

== Reviews ==
Deepa Gahlot of Rediff gave the movie a very positive review and wrote "The Movie You Simply *Must* Watch".

== Awards ==
Year	Award	Category	Nominee(s)	Result
1985	National Film Awards	Best Debut Film of a Director	Ramesh Sharma	Won
1985	National Film Awards	Best Actor	Shashi Kapoor	Won
1985	National Film Awards	Best Cinematography	Subrata Mitra	Won
