= Barnali =

Barnali برنالی
- Village and Union Council
- Interactive map of Barnali
- Coordinates: 32°43′16″N 73°50′08″E
- Country: Pakistan
- Province: Punjab
- Division: Gujrat
- District: Gujrat
- Tehsil: Kharian

Government

Population (2018)
  - Total: 5,786
- Time zone: UTC+5 (PST)

Barnali is a village and union council of Gujrat District, in the Punjab province of Pakistan. It is part of Kharian Tehsil. The agriculture in the village is entirely rain-dependent.
