= Ghar Bazar =

Ghar Bazaar
- Directed by: D.S. Azad
- Produced by: M.L. Jain; Mrs. Gita Azad
- Cinematography: Dilip Dutta
- Edited by: Sudhakar Naik
- Music by: Usha Khanna
- Release date: 1998
- Running time: 130 minutes
- Country: India
- Language: Hindi

Ghar Bazar or Ghar Aur Bazar is a 1998 Hindi film starring Sharmila Tagore, Shekhar Suman and Mehmood, while Shashi Kapoor made a special appearance in the film. The film had its audio launch in 1986, but was not released until 1998.

== Cast ==
- Sharmila Tagore as Gul
- Natasha Shailendra as Roopa
- Shekhar Suman as Pandit Ravishankar Bhatt
- Nilu Phule as Kishan Murari
- Gulshan Grover as Mohan
- Mehmood as Balaam Hyderabadi
- Jankidas as Gupta
- Shashi Kapoor as Amar (Special appearance)

== Soundtrack ==
The music of the film was composed by Usha Khanna, while lyrics were penned by Kulwant Jaani.

1. "Dil Ki Awaz Hai Main Teri Ho Gayi" - Asha Bhosle
2. "Main Dil Bech Doongi" - Kavita Krishnamurthy
3. "Main Tujh Se Teri Sab" - Mehmood
4. "Nach Kudiye Nigar Nach Kudiye" - Anuradha Paudwal, Mohammed Aziz
5. "Panditji Kya Soch Rahe Ho" - Shabbir Kumar, Usha Khanna
