= Prem Rog =

- Poster
- Directed by: Raj Kapoor
- Written by: Jainendra Jain
- Story by: Kamna Chandra
- Produced by: Raj Kapoor
- Starring: Rishi Kapoor; Padmini Kolhapure; Shammi Kapoor; Nanda; Tanuja; Om Prakash
- Cinematography: Radhu Karmakar
- Edited by: Raj Kapoor
- Music by: Laxmikant–Pyarelal
- Production company: R. K. Films
- Distributed by: R. K. Films
- Release date: 13 August 1982
- Running time: 172 minutes
- Country: India
- Language: Hindi

Prem Rog (transl. "Ailment of Love" ) is a 1982 Hindi-language musical romantic drama directed and produced by Raj Kapoor, with screenplay written by Jainendra Jain and Kamna Chandra. The film tells the story of a man's (Rishi Kapoor) love towards a woman, who is a higher status widow (Padmini Kolhapure). This film marked Raj Kapoor's return to social themes.

Released on 13th August 1982, it took second spot at the box office that year after Subhash Ghai's Vidhaata (also starring Kolhapure and Shammi Kapoor).

At the 30th Filmfare Awards, the film received a leading 12 nominations, including Best Film, Best Actor (Rishi), Best Supporting Actress (Nanda), and Best Music Director (Laxmikant–Pyarelal), and won a leading 4 awards (tying with Shakti), including Best Director (Raj) and Best Actress (Kolhapure).

Over the years, Prem Rog has achieved cult-status and is considered one of the best works of Raj Kapoor, Rishi Kapoor and Padmini Kolhapure.

== Plot ==
Devdhar is a poor orphan who in his childhood had an innocent friendship with Manorama, the only niece of the rich and powerful Bade Thakur and daughter of Virender Singh known as Chhote Thakur, who has a secret affair with Chamiya. The benevolent Thakur helped Devdhar go to the city for higher studies. 8 years later, Devdhar returns to his village, where he finds Manorama has grown up. After seeing her again, Devdhar falls in love and expects that Manorama also has feelings for him. However Manorama does not reciprocate his emotions. The day Devdhar intends to ask her hand from Bade Thakur, whom he considers to be broad minded of all the village elders, he meets Kunwar Narendra Pratap Singh, Manorama's prospective groom, who not only is wealthier than Manorama's family, but Manorama also expresses her infatuation with the man. So Devdhar does not express his feelings to her and the only people who learn of his plight are his cousin Radha and Manorama's mother Chhoti Maa.

Kunwar Narendra Pratap Singh loves Manorama dearly. However, he dies three days after their wedding in a road accident. At her own home, she is being prepared to have her head shaved against the protestations of Chhoti Maa and Bade Thakur when Raj Rani, sister-in-law of Kunwar Narendra Pratap Singh intervenes and takes Manorama with her. She slowly tries to piece her life together with help of Raj Rani and her son. One day, after Raja Virendra Pratap Singh, her brother-in-law, rapes her, she returns to her parental home. When Devdhar learns of the situation, he works to rebuild Manorama's life and bring a smile to her face. Devdhar is determined to revive her faith in life and love. In doing so, he eventually has to face the wrath of the powerful Thakur, armed with old-age traditions and customs in his favor.

Manorama confesses to her mother about the events since her widowhood. Her brother-in-law and father both are enraged about her affair with Devdhar and swear to kill Devdhar and force her to go back to her marital home. A fight ensues in the village and in the end the youngsters reunite.

== Cast ==
- Rishi Kapoor as Devdhar "Dev," a penniless-but-educated orphan raised by his maternal uncle
- Padmini Kolhapure as Manorama "Rama" Singh, the daughter of the local aristocratic family
- Shammi Kapoor as Bade Raja Thakur, Rama's paternal uncle
- Nanda as Chhoti Maa, Rama's mother
- Tanuja as Raj Rani, wife of Raja Virendra Pratap Singh
- Sushma Seth as Badi Maa, wife of Bade Raja
- Kulbhushan Kharbanda as Virendra "Vir" Singh, Rama's father
- Raza Murad as Raja Virendra Pratap Singh, Narendra's elder brother
- Om Prakash as Panditji, the priest; Dev's maternal uncle
- Dulari as Panditji's wife
- Vijayendra Ghatge as Kunwar Narendra Pratap Singh, Rama's husband
- Bindu as Chamiya
- Kiran Vairale as Radha

== Soundtrack ==
Prem Rog

Soundtrack album by Laxmikant–Pyarelal
- Released: 1982
- Genre: Feature film soundtrack

The music was composed by Laxmikant–Pyarelal and the lyrics were penned by Santosh Anand (4 songs), Amir Qazalbash (1 song) and Pandit Narendra Sharma (1 song). According to Box Office India, the film's soundtrack was one of the best-selling Hindi film albums of the 1980s. Its songs, such as "Main Hoon Prem Rogi" and "Mohabbat Hai Kya Cheez" dominated the musical charts that year.

#	Song	Singer(s)	Lyricist	Raga	Length
1	"Bhanware Ne Khilaaya Phool"	Lata Mangeshkar, Suresh Wadkar	Pandit Narendra Sharma		07:48
2	"Main Hoon Prem Rogi"	Suresh Wadkar	Santosh Anand	Shivaranjani	07:58
3	"Meri Kismat Mein Tu Nahi Shayad"	Lata Mangeshkar, Suresh Wadkar	Amir Qazalbash		07:31
4	"Mohabbat Hai Kya Cheez"	Lata Mangeshkar, Suresh Wadkar	Santosh Anand		07:14
5	"Yeh Pyaar Tha Ya Kuch Aur Tha"	Sudha Malhotra, Anwar	Santosh Anand	Jogkauns	06:26
6	"Yeh Galiyan Yeh Chaubara"	Lata Mangeshkar	Santosh Anand	Bhairavi (Hindustani)	07:11

== Awards and nominations ==
Year	Nominee / work	Award	Result
1983	Raj Kapoor	Best Director	Won
1983	Padmini Kolhapure	Best Actress	Won
1983	Santosh Anand (for "Mohabbat Hai Kya Cheez")	Best Lyricist	Won
1983	Raj Kapoor	Best Editing	Won
1983	Raj Kapoor (for R. K. Films)	Best Film	Nominated
1983	Rishi Kapoor	Best Actor	Nominated
1983	Nanda	Best Supporting Actress	Nominated
1983	Kamna Chandra	Best Story	Nominated
1983	Laxmikant–Pyarelal	Best Music Director	Nominated
1983	Ameer Qazalbash (for "Meri Kismat Mein Tu")	Best Lyricist	Nominated
1983	Suresh Wadkar (for "Main Hoon Prem Rogi")	Best Male Playback Singer	Nominated
1983	Suresh Wadkar (for "Meri Kismat Mein Tu" )	Best Male Playback Singer	Nominated
