= Rama Vij =

Indian film actress

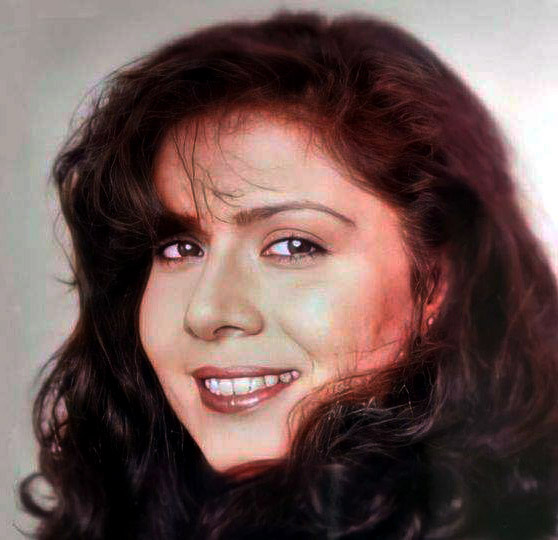
- Rama Vij, Indian actress
- Occupation: Actor

Rama Vij is an Indian actress who works in Punjabi and Hindi movies and TV serials.

== Career ==
Vij is a well known name in Pollywood (Punjabi Cinema in India) and Bollywood. Her debut movie was "Taxie-Taxie" in 1977 with Amol Palekar . After that, she acted in various movies;"Pal do Pal ka Saath" Aarambh, Lava, Hawayein to her credit in Bollywood. She is a well-known face on Doordarshan and has worked in some of the most-appreciated works such as The Far Pavilions (1984), Nukkad (1986), Vikram Aur Betaal (1988), etc. Punjabi cinema, being her specialty, has contributed a lot to her success with movies including Kachehri, Gabbroo Punjab Da, Dhee Rani, Suneha, Veera, Takraar, Chann Pardesi and Khushiaan.

Rama had shot to fame in the region (Punjab) with her roles in Chann Pardesi and Kachehari, both national award-winning feature films in Punjabi. However, she got national level recognition as an actress through the very popular teleserial Nukkad way back in 1985. Despite her acting talent, Rama could not do well in Bollywood, but still she managed to leave her mark in some well-known movies, such as Veerana, Joshilaay, Prem Qaidi, Lava, Taxi Taxie (1978), Chaand Kaa Tukdaa (1994).

She has worked in over 25 teleserials including Nukkad, Intezar, Manoranjan, Himalaya Darshan, Rishte, Circus and Zindagi, Misaal, Sabko Khabar Hai Sabko Pata Hai, Sanjha Chulha and Chunni.

She is known for playing lead role in seriel Karma Wali based on story by Amrita Pritam.

Her last appearance in a Bollywood movie was in the feature film Hawayein, directed by Ammtoje Mann. Her last Punjabi movie was Khushiaan (2012).

In January 2021, she was made jury member feature film, Indian Panorama at the 51st International Film Festival of India, Goa 2021.

In November 2023, she served as jury member at the 54th International Film Festival of India for Indian Panorama Feature Films section.

== Selected filmography ==
- Lava (1985) as Kul's (Kulbhushan Kharbanda) wife
- Zakhmi Aurat (1988) as Dr. Asha Mehta
- Parbat Ke Us Paar (1988)
- Prem Qaidi (1991) as Superintendent Prabhavati
- Chaand Kaa Tukdaa (1994) as Mrs. Malhotra
- Nirbhay (1996) as Indira Sinha
