= 30th Filmfare Awards =

1983 awards for Hindi cinema

- Date: 25 September 1983
- Site: Shanmukhananda Hall, Mumbai

Highlights
- Best Film: Shakti
- Best Director: Raj Kapoor for Prem Rog
- Best Actor: Dilip Kumar for Shakti
- Best Actress: Padmini Kolhapure for Prem Rog
- Most awards: Prem Rog & Shakti (4)
- Most nominations: Prem Rog (12)

The 30th Filmfare Awards for Hindi cinema were held on 25 September 1983.

Prem Rog led the ceremony with 12 nominations, followed by Nikaah with 11 nominations, Shakti with 8 nominations and Bazaar with 7 nominations.

Prem Rog and Shakti won 4 awards each, thus becoming the most-awarded films at the ceremony, with the former winning Best Director (for Raj Kapoor) and Best Actress (for Padmini Kolhapure), and the latter winning Best Film and Best Actor (for Dilip Kumar).

Amitabh Bachchan received triple nominations for Best Actor for his performances in Bemisaal, Namak Halaal and Shakti, but lost the award to Dilip Kumar, who won the award for a record 8th time for his performance in Shakti.

== Main awards ==
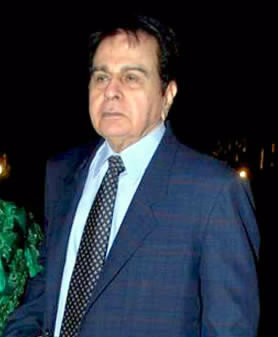
Dilip Kumar — Best Actor winner for Shakti

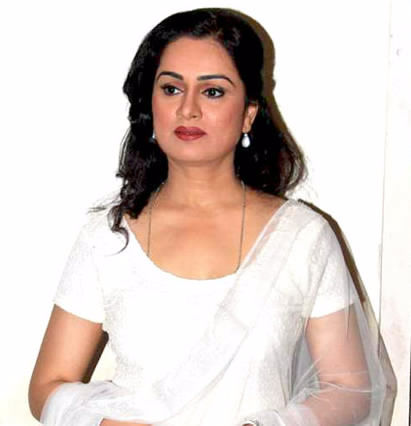
Padmini Kolhapure — Best Actress winner for Prem Rog

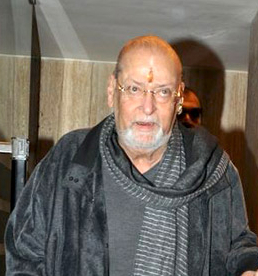
Shammi Kapoor — Best Supporting Actor winner for Vidhaata

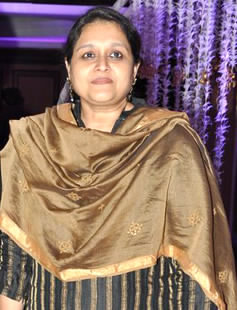
Supriya Pathak — Best Supporting Actress winner for Bazaar

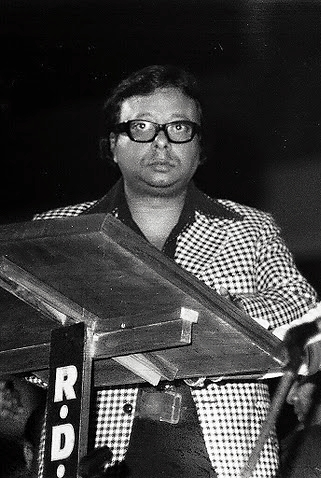
R. D. Burman — Best Music Director winner for Sanam Teri Kasam

=== Best Film ===
Shakti

- Bazaar
- Nikaah
- Prem Rog
- Vidhaata

=== Best Director ===
Raj Kapoor – Prem Rog

- B. R. Chopra – Nikaah
- Ramesh Sippy – Shakti
- Sagar Sarhadi – Bazaar
- Subhash Ghai – Vidhaata

=== Best Actor ===
Dilip Kumar – Shakti

- Amitabh Bachchan – Bemisaal
- Amitabh Bachchan – Namak Halaal
- Amitabh Bachchan – Shakti
- Naseeruddin Shah – Bazaar
- Rishi Kapoor – Prem Rog
- Sanjeev Kumar – Angoor

=== Best Actress ===
Padmini Kolhapure – Prem Rog

- Raakhee – Shakti
- Rekha – Jeevan Dhaara
- Salma Agha – Nikaah
- Smita Patil – Bazaar

=== Best Supporting Actor ===
Shammi Kapoor – Vidhaata

- Girish Karnad – Teri Kasam
- Sanjeev Kumar – Vidhaata
- Shashi Kapoor – Namak Halaal
- Vinod Mehra – Bemisaal

=== Best Supporting Actress ===
Supriya Pathak – Bazaar

- Kiran Vairale – Namkeen
- Nanda – Prem Rog
- Ranjeeta – Teri Kasam
- Waheeda Rehman – Namkeen

=== Best Comic Actor ===
Deven Verma – Angoor

- Ashok Kumar – Shaukeen
- Jagdeep – Ghazab
- Mehmood – Khud-Daar
- Utpal Dutt – Shaukeen

=== Best Story ===
Namkeen – Samaresh Basu

- Bazaar – Sagar Sarhadi
- Nikaah – Dr. Achla Nagar
- Prem Rog – Kamna Chandra
- Shakti – Salim–Javed

=== Best Screenplay ===
Shakti – Salim–Javed

=== Best Dialogue ===
Nikaah – Dr. Achla Nagar

=== Best Music Director ===
R. D. Burman – Sanam Teri Kasam

- Bazaar – Khayyam
- Namak Halaal – Bappi Lahiri
- Nikaah – Ravi
- Prem Rog – Laxmikant–Pyarelal

=== Best Lyricist ===
Prem Rog – Santosh Anand for Mohabbat Hai Kya Cheez

- Namak Halaal – Anjaan & Prakash Mehra for Pag Ghungroo
- Nikaah – Hasan Kamal for Dil Ke Armaan
- Nikaah – Hasan Kamal for Dil Ke Yeh Arzoo
- Prem Rog – Amir Qazalbash for Meri Kismat Mein Tu

=== Best Playback Singer – Male ===
Namak Halaal – Kishore Kumar for Pag Ghungroo

- Prem Rog – Suresh Wadkar for Main Hoon Prem Rogi
- Prem Rog – Suresh Wadkar for Meri Kismat Mein Tu
- Teri Kasam – Amit Kumar for Yeh Zameen Gaa Rahi Hai

=== Best Playback Singer – Female ===
Nikaah – Salma Agha for Dil Ke Armaan

- Nikaah – Salma Agha for Dil Ki Yeh Arzoo
- Nikaah – Salma Agha for Faza Bhi Hai Jawaan
- Star – Nazia Hassan for Boom Boom
- Yeh Nazdeekiyan – Anuradha Paudwal for Maine Ek Geet Likha Hai

=== Best Art Direction ===
Namkeen – Ajit Banerjee

=== Best Cinematography ===
Bemisaal – Jaywant Pathare

=== Best Editing ===
Prem Rog – Raj Kapoor

=== Best Sound ===
Shakti – P. Harikishan

== Critics' awards ==
=== Best Documentary ===
Experience India

== Biggest Winners ==
- Prem Rog – 4/12
- Shakti – 4/8
- Bazaar – 1/7
- Nikaah – 2/11
- Namkeen – 2/4
- Namak Halaal – 1/5

== See also ==
- Filmfare Awards
