= Yatrik =

Yatrik may refer to:

- Yatrik (film), a 1952 Indian film
- Tarun Majumdar, Indian film director credited as Yatrik
- Yatrik (theatre group), a Delhi theatre group
