= Andhi Gali =

- Directed by: Buddhadev Dasgupta
- Written by: Buddhadev Dasgupta
- Produced by: Buddhadev Dasgupta
- Starring: Deepti Naval
- Cinematography: Kamal Nayak
- Edited by: Ujjal Nandi
- Release date: 1984
- Running time: 152 minutes
- Country: India
- Language: Hindi

Andhi Gali (English language: Dead End) is a 1984 Hindi drama film directed and written by Buddhadev Dasgupta, and based on Bengali story, Ghar Bari by Dibyendu Palit. It stars Deepti Naval, Mahesh Bhatt and Kulbhushan Kharbanda. The Naxalite movement in Bengal in the 1970s forms a backdrop to the film.
