= Hemant Mishra =

Indian character actor (born 1960)

- Born: 1960; India
- Occupation: Actor

Mishra (हेमन्त मिश्रा) is an Indian character actor. He is an alumnus of the National School of Drama.

== Early life and career ==
He is from Delhi where he acted in many TV serials, movies for Doordarshan. He later he moved to Mumbai.

== Films ==
- Ek Ruka Hua Faisla (1986) – Juror #6
- Joshilaay (1989)
- Bandit Queen (1994) – Policeman
- Dil Se.. (1998)
- Hamara Dil Aapke Paas Hai (2000)
- Pratha (2002) – Choudhary
- Company (2002) – Sharma
- Band Baaja Baaraat (2010, Special Appearance)
- Bijuka (2012) – Painku's Friend 1 (final film role)

== TV serials ==
- Dastoor (1996)
- Phir Wahi Taalash (1989–1990)
