= Mushir Alam =

Indian film producer

- Died: February 20, 2019; India
- Occupation: Film producer
- Years active: 1970–1997
- Organization: Mushir–Riaz
- Partners: Mohammed Riaz
- Awards: Filmfare Award for Best Film (Shakti, 1983)

Mushir Alam (died 20 February, 2019) was an Indian film producer. After a nationally publicized funeral, he was buried in Jajmau. He was known as one of Bollywood's highest-profile and most successful producers of the 70s and 80s. His production shingle was Mushir-Riaz, a joint venture with fellow producer Mohammed Riaz (died 21 May 2022). He was kidnapped in Mumbai in 1982.

== Filmography ==
- Safar (1970)
- Mehbooba (1976)
- Bairaag (1976)
- Apne Paraye (1980)
- Rajput (1982)
- Shakti (1982)
- Zabardast (1985)
- Samundar (1986)
- Commando (1988)
- Akayla (1991)
- Virasat (1997)

== Awards ==
In 1983, Alam received the Filmfare Award for Best Film for Shakti.
