= Susman (film) =

- Directed by: Shyam Benegal
- Written by: Shama Zaidi
- Produced by: Shyam Benegal
- Starring: Shabana Azmi; Om Puri; Kulbhushan Kharbanda
- Cinematography: Ashok Mehta
- Edited by: Bhanudas Divakar
- Music by: Vanraj Bhatia
- Release date: 1987
- Running time: 140 min
- Country: India
- Language: Hindi

Susman (Hindi pronunciation: [sʊsmən]; transl. The Essence) is a 1987 Indian Hindi film directed by Shyam Benegal. The film highlighted the struggle of rural handloom weavers in the wake of rapid industrialization.

The film was selected for the Indian Panorama at Filmotsav 1987, invited to the London Film Festival, the Chicago Film Festival, the Vancouver International Film Festival, the Sydney and Melbourne Film Festivals 1987. It was remade as Kanchivaram in Tamil by Priyadarshan.

The film features poetry by the Indian mystic saint Kabir, who was born into a family of weavers, sung by Pandit Jasraj.

== Cast ==
- Shabana Azmi as Gauramma
- Om Puri as Ramulu
- Kulbhushan Kharbanda as Narasimha
- Neena Gupta as Mandira
- Mohan Agashe as President of Handloom Cooperative Society
- K.K. Raina
- Annu Kapoor as Lakshmaya
- Ila Arun
- Anita Kanwar
- Pankaj Kapur
- Jayant Kripalani
- Satish Kaushik
- Harish Patel
- Pallavi Joshi as daughter Chinna
