= Lava (1985 film) =

- Directed by: Ravindra Peepat
- Written by: Anees Bazmee; Ravindra Peepat; Vinay Shukla
- Produced by: Balbir Kaur
- Starring: Dimple Kapadia; Raj Babbar; Asha Parekh; Rajiv Kapoor
- Narrated by: Dharmendra
- Cinematography: Manmohan Singh
- Edited by: Subhash Sehgal
- Music by: R.D. Burman; Anand Bakshi (lyrics)
- Release date: 1985
- Country: India
- Language: Hindi

Lava is a 1985 Indian Hindi film directed by Ravindra Peepat and starring Dimple Kapadia, Asha Parekh, Raj Babbar and Rajiv Kapoor in lead roles. Film directors Krishan Lamba and Anees Bazmee was assistant directors to the Peepat.

== Plot ==
Amar lives a poor lifestyle with his widowed mom in India, he is unemployed, does not make enough effort to find a job, and spends most of his time with his sweetheart, Rinku Dayal. When his mom finds out that he has been writing love letters, she asks him to introduce his girlfriend, which he does. She approves of Rinku and would like both of them to get married, she also warns Rinku that Amar is fated to die under water and must keep away from all lakes, rivers, and swimming pools at all costs, as he cannot swim. Then a few days later, Amar accidentally falls down in a river, is swept through a waterfall and is believed to be dead. His shocked and devastated mom loses her sanity, and keeps on hoping that Amar will return one day. Then six months later, Amar does return home to his overjoyed mom, and is anxious to go to Rinku and tell her the good news. It is then his mom informs him that Rinku has married Ajit Verma, her dad's boss, shortly after she found out that Amar had drowned. A shocked Amar must now find out why his sweetheart chose to marry a wealthy man, and it is here he will find out that his falling in the river was not an accident but he was the victim of a conspiracy against him.

== Cast ==
The cast is listed below:

- Dimple Kapadia ... Rinku Dayal
- Asha Parekh ... Amar's mom
- Raj Babbar ... Ajit Verma
- Rajiv Kapoor ... Amar
- Kulbhushan Kharbanda ... Kul Verna
- Rajendra Nath ... Santosh
- Madan Puri ... Dayal
- Narendra Nath ... Nath
- Sudhir ... Party Guest
- Vikas Anand ... Amar's Saviour
- Rama Vij ... Kul's wife

== Release and reception ==
In the 2020 book Reviewing Hindi Cinema Since 1945: Movie Guide 2020, the film was described as "A beautifully filmed but an inept revenge saga". Sukanya Verma of Rediff.com believes it is one of Kapadia's underrated performances.

== Soundtrack ==
The soundtrack of the film contains 6 songs. The music is composed by R.D. Burman, with lyrics authored by Anand Bakshi.

Song	Singer(s)
"Kuchh Log Mohabbat Karke"	Kishore Kumar
"Dil Kya Hai"	Kishore Kumar, Asha Bhosle, Shailendra Singh
"Hum Tum Dono Milke"	Kishore Kumar, Lata Mangeshkar
"Jeene De Yeh Duniya"	Asha Bhosle, Manmohan Singh
"Koi Bhi Naam Do"	Lata Mangeshkar
"Jeene De Yeh Duniya" (female)	Asha Bhosle
