= Jadu Ka Shankh =

- Directed by: Sai Paranjapye
- Music by: Bhaskar Chandavarkar
- Release date: 1974
- Country: India
- Language: Hindi

Jadu Ka Shankh is a 1974 Bollywood drama film directed by Sai Paranjpye.

== Cast ==
- Nandita Aras
- Sulabha Deshpande
- Girish Karnad
- Kulbhushan Kharbanda
- Rahul Ranade
