= Joy Michael =

Indian theatre personality

Joy Camille Michael
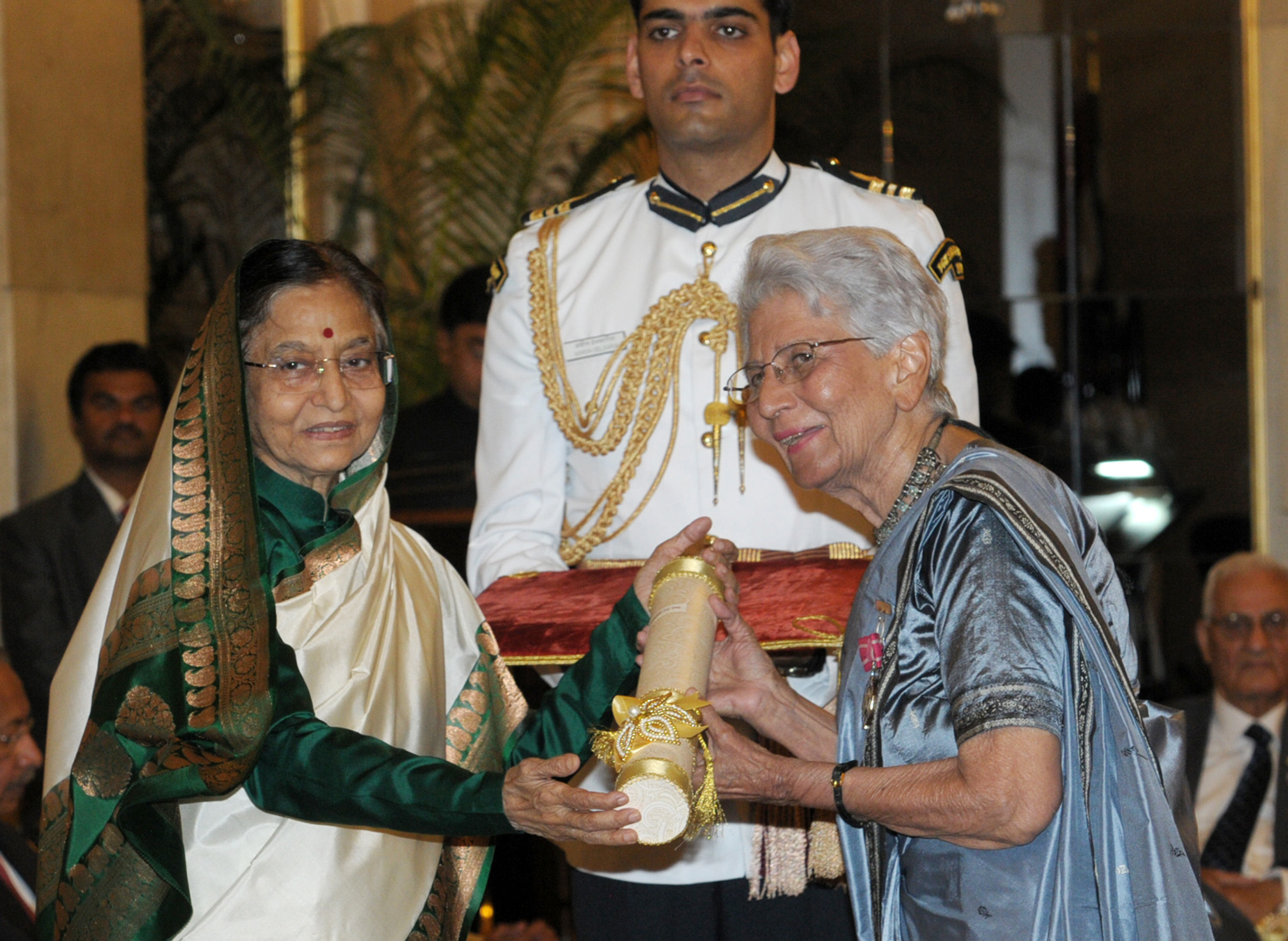
- The President, Smt. Pratibha Devisingh Patil presenting the Padma Shri Award to Smt. Joy Michael, at an Investiture Ceremony I, at Rashtrapati Bhavan, in New Delhi on March 22, 2012.
- Born: 1927; Asansol, West Bengal, British India
- Died: 9 March 2018 (aged 90–91); New Delhi, India
- Other name: None
- Occupations: Theatre personality, former principal of St.Thomas' School (Mandir Marg, New Delhi)
- Years active: 1927-2018
- Spouse: Hughbert Eustace Michael
- Children: Meriel Irene Joy Michael and Kristine Michael.
- Parent: Ruby Christian (born in Calcutta) Gordon Stanley Christian (born in Calcutta)
- Awards: Padma Shri; Sangeet Natak Akademi Award; Thespo life Achievement Award. Emeritus Theatre Director; Sahitya Kala Parishad Award; Delhi Natya Sangh Award; Rockefeller Award; Chamanlal Memorial Society Award; Raja Ram Mohan Nation Education Award, C.F Andrews Distinguished Alumnus Award.
- Website: Official web site

Joy Michael (1927-2018) was an Indian theatre personality and the co-founder of Yatrik, a repertory company based in Delhi. The Government of India honored her in 2012, with the fourth highest civilian award of Padma Shri.

== Biography ==
Joy Michael, born in Asansol, West Bengal, secured a postgraduate degree in English literature from the St. Stephen's College, Delhi where she became the secretary of the Shakespeare Society, reported to be the first woman secretary, and a member of the Supreme Council of the college. Later she went to London and did graduate studies in Speech and Drama at the London Academy of Music and Dramatic Art and theatre training at the British Drama League. After working in the professional theatre in London for a while, she returned to India to continue her theatre activities in Delhi. Principal of St.Thomas School, Mandir Marg, New Delhi.

In 1964, Michael, along with Roshan Seth, Rati Bartholomew, Sushma Seth and Marcus Murch, founded Yatrik, a theatre group based in Delhi. She has remained the Director of the group for 40 years, during which period the group collaborated with many theatre personalities such as Alyque Padamsee, Ebrahim Alkazi, Barry John, Kulbhushan Kharbanda, Sinia Duggal, Madhuri Bhatia, Salima Raza, Kusum Haidar, Tejeshwar Singh, Bhaskar Bhattacharya, Lola Chatterjee, Sunit Tandon, Avijit Dutt and Prakash Bhatia at different times.

Joy Michael has worked with the United States-India Educational Foundation as an executive and has lectured at the University of Washington, Virginia and the Panjab University. Later, she joined St. Thomas' School, Delhi as its Principal and worked there for 15 years. She has also worked as an educational consultant to many schools managed by the Diocese of the Church of North India in Delhi, Shimla, Mussoorie and Assam. She has served as an executive council member of the World Communion of Reformed Churches. She has also been an active member and on the executive committee of The Y.W.C.A. (Young Women's Christian Association) of India.

Joy Michael is reported to have collaborated with over 200 plays, as writer or director and has also prepared plays for television and the radio. She is married to Colonel Hughbert Michael, and the couple has two daughters, Meriel and Kristine. and two grandchildren, Joy Indu Michael and Arnav John Hugh Michael.

== Awards and recognitions ==
Joy Michael, holder of the title of Emeritus Theatre Director awarded by the Ministry of Culture, Government of India, is a recipient of Sangeet Natak Akademi Award which she received in 2009 for theatre direction. She has also received the Sahitya Kala Parishad Award, Delhi Natya Sangh Award, Rockefeller Award, Chamanlal Memorial Society Award and the Raja Ram Mohan Nation Education Award. In 2012, the Government of India included her in the Republic day honours list for the award of Padma Shri.

== See also ==
- St. Stephen's College, Delhi
- London Academy of Music and Dramatic Art
- Church of North India
- World Communion of Reformed Churches
