= Joshilaay =

1989 Indian film by Sibte Hassan Rizvi

- Theatrical release poster
- Directed by: Sibte Hassan Rizvi (Note: The film was initially directed by Shekhar Kapur, but he left the project midway due to creative differences. The later portions of the film were directed by Sibte Hassan Rizvi, who is credited as the director.)
- Written by: Javed Akhtar
- Produced by: Sibte Hassan Rizvi
- Starring: Sunny Deol; Anil Kapoor; Sridevi; Meenakshi Sheshadri; Kulbhushan Kharbanda; Rajesh Vivek; Anirudh Agrawal; Satish Kaushik
- Cinematography: Pravin Bhatt; Ko-Hung Chang
- Edited by: I. M. Kunnu
- Music by: R. D. Burman
- Production company: New World Enterprises
- Release date: 10 February 1989
- Country: India
- Language: Hindi

Joshilaay (transl. Spirited) is a 1989 Indian Hindi-language action-adventure film directed by Sibte Hassan Rizvi. The film stars Sunny Deol, Anil Kapoor, Sridevi, Meenakshi Sheshadri, Kulbhushan Kharbanda, Rajesh Vivek and Satish Kaushik.

The story, screenplay, dialogues and lyrics of the film were written by Javed Akhtar. The music was composed by R. D. Burman.

== Plot ==
The story revolves around two men: Dara and Karan. They were wronged by Raja Singh and Jogi Thakur respectively. Karan had witnessed his family's brutal murder at the hands of Jogi Thakur and is now driven by a desire for revenge. Dara's motivation is rooted in his childhood separation. As a young boy, he was torn from his family by an unknown person and left to fend for himself near a circus. He was supported by a circus manager.

After a successful robbery, Raja Singh betrays his partner, Jogi Thakur, abandoning him during a police chase. While Jogi Thakur is arrested and sentenced to twenty years in prison, Raja Singh uses his newfound wealth to become a powerful and feared local tyrant.

Twenty years later, Raja Singh has become Raja Sahib, a dreaded ruler of many villages and a respected man. Dara is desperately looking for answers while Karan is thirsting for revenge. Where Dara is the strong, fun and witty type, Karan is the silent and angry type. Jogi Thakur is released from jail and he thirsts for revenge against Raja Sahib.

Dara discovers that Jogi Thakur holds the key to the mystery of his past. His initial goal of getting answers gives him a new, urgent objective: he must capture Jogi Thakur alive. He believes that Jogi Thakur can reveal his true identity and lead him to the family he lost. This creates a direct conflict with Karan, whose sole objective is to kill Jogi Thakur to avenge his family.

The plot gains momentum when both Dara and Karan, aided by their respective girlfriends Gulabo and Mangala, independently track down Raja Sahib. Their paths cross, and they soon realize they are on the same mission. However, their methods and motivations are in conflict. Despite their differing goals, Dara and Karan become fast friends. They decide to join forces to achieve their separate, but ultimately aligned, goals. Eventually, Dara comes to know that Raja Sahib was responsible for murdering his parents and abandoning him. Now he develops a fury for revenge against Raja Sahib.

Dara and Karan combine their efforts to crave a path for showdown with both Raja Sahib and Jogi Thakur. When Raja Sahib and Jogi Thakur realize they have a common existential threat from Dara and Karan, they form an alliance to fight them. Dara and Karan finally confront Raja Sahib and Jogi Thakur and drag them to their deaths.

== Cast ==
- Sunny Deol as Dara
- Anil Kapoor as Karan
- Sridevi as Gulabo – Dara’s girlfriend
- Meenakshi Sheshadri as Mangala – Karan’s girlfriend
- Kulbhushan Kharbanda as Raja Singh / Raja Sahib
- Rajesh Vivek as Jogi Thakur
- Satish Kaushik as Bachchu Lal
- Kumud Tripathi as Hari Prasad Khatpatia – Gulabo’s father
- Prema Narayan as Sharbati – Gulabo’s friend
- Rajesh Puri as Banke
- Bharat Bhushan as Mangala's father
- Hemant Mishra as Surkhiya
- Anirudh Agarwal as Damroo
- Satyen Kappu as Circus Manager
- Alok Nath as Doctor
- Rama Vij as Doctor’s wife
- Deep Dhillon as Goons' boss
- Pradeep Rawat as Goon
- Jaspal Sandhu (uncredited)

== Production ==
The film was mostly directed by Shekhar Kapur, but he left before completion due to differences with the producer. Kapur had initially planned to cast Kamal Haasan in the role of Karan, but later opted for Anil Kapoor. After Kapur’s departure, Sibte Hasan Rizvi took over and completed the film. The film was shot on location in Leh and Ladakh.

== Music and soundtrack ==
R. D. Burman composed the music for the film and the lyrics of the songs were penned by Javed Akhtar.

Song	Singer
"Joshilaay, Woh Shehzade"	Kishore Kumar
"Dhar Dham Chik Lag Gayi"	Asha Bhosle
"Na Ja Jaan-E-Jaan, Na Ja, Na Ja Jaan-E-Jaan"	Asha Bhosle, R. D. Burman
"O Dhola Dhol Manjira Baje Re, Kali Chhnit Ka Ghagra"	Asha Bhosle, Suresh Wadkar
"Dhak Dhak Jiya Kare, Jane Kya Piya Kare"	Asha Bhosle, Usha Mangeshkar
