= Rajput (film) =

- Poster
- Directed by: Vijay Anand
- Produced by: Mushir-Riaz
- Starring: Dharmendra; Vinod Khanna; Rajesh Khanna; Hema Malini; Ranjeeta; Tina Munim; Ranjeet
- Music by: Laxmikant–Pyarelal
- Production company: M. R. Productions
- Release date: 16 April 1982
- Country: India
- Language: Hindi

Rajput is a 1982 Hindi romantic action film starring Dharmendra, Vinod Khanna, Rajesh Khanna, Hema Malini, Tina Munim and Ranjeeta Kaur. It was directed by Vijay Anand. The film took many years for its completion. As per Boxofficeindia.com, it was the ninth highest-grossing film of 1982.

== Plot ==
An amendment in independent India comes in which kingdoms are seized, and people from the royal family are no longer rulers. One such kingdom is about to be seized from Jaipal Singh, who refuses to lose his position. He continues to rule the jurisdiction as king and compels people to pay tax to him. People protest against that, and one such person is Police Inspector Dhirendra Singh, which causes his transfer to a small village. His parents arrange his marriage with Janki, who is the daughter of Dhirendra's father's childhood friend. However, Janki is in love with Manupratap Singh. Enmity between two families makes Janki's aunty warn her that their love will not be accepted by Janki's father, Pratap Singh, but both of them are strong in their love and have an intimate affair. Manupratap Singh's younger brother Bhanupratap, is in love with an orphan girl Kamli. All are happy until Raja Jaipal Singh rapes Kamli, and she runs away from the village. Meanwhile, Jaipal Singh says that he wants to marry Janki, which angers her father, as he is the father of a teenage girl even if he is a King.

Manupratap and Bhanupratap protest against the king, and Bhanupratap becomes a dacoit. Both Manupratap's father and Janki's father strongly oppose their love. Janki is forcefully married to Dhirendra Singh against her wishes. When Janki leaves for her husband's home, she is kidnapped by Jaipal Singh's nephew, who tries to rape her. However, Manupratap shoots him dead, and he falls on Janki, who faints due to falling from a horse. Dhirendra misunderstands that Janki was raped, and he will not touch her. After two months, he discovers that Janki is pregnant and suspects it is the result of rape and tells her to abort the baby, but Janki knows that it is Manupratap's child and so refuses and insists that she will leave Dhirendra's life. However, Dhirendra, out of his love for Janki, permits her to give birth to the baby.

Janki gives birth to a son, and she goes to jail to inform Manupratap about it. However, Manupratap, who finds Dhirendra a nice man, advises Janki to live with her husband and forget him. Janki obeys him and apologizes to Dhirendra for all the misery caused by her. Dhirendra initially refuses to see the child but accepts her baby and promises that he will consider the baby as his own child.

Jaipal Singh sends his daughter Jaya abroad for education to stop her from questioning him. Manupratap and Bhanupratap's father is killed by Jaipal Singh, and Bhanupratap waits to take revenge on him.

Seven years pass by, and Dhirendra Singh is now Superintendent of Police. He finds many dacoits have assembled, and they plunder many areas and the root cause is Jaipal Singh, but he lacks any evidence to prove it.

Bhanupratap, now a bandit named Bhavani, steals money and helps the poor. Manupratap is released from jail, and he stays for one night in Dhirendra Singh's house. There, he meets his son, who is affectionate towards his father, Dhirendra. Though he cannot reveal who he is, he is affectionate toward the child.

Kamli lives an illegitimate life with her son outside the village. Jaya, the daughter of Jaipal Singh, returns from abroad. Bhanupratap kidnaps her to take revenge on Jaipal Singh, who once raped his lover.

Later, Bhanupratap forces Jaipal to marry Kamli by threatening to kill Jaya. Jaya understands her father and sides with Bhanupratap. She finds Bhanupratap a well-educated kind man, and both fall in love.

Manupratap misunderstands that his father and brother were killed by a bandit, Bhavani, and sets off to kill him without knowing that Bhavani is his brother Bhanupratap.

Dhirendra comes to arrest Bhavani on a kidnapping charge, but Jaya admits that she is there on her own wish. Dhirendra finds that the people are oppressed by Jaipal and want to protest against him. Dhirendra advises them to not take the law into their hands and that he would take action against him lawfully. He gathers pieces of evidence and goes to arrest Jaipal, but he drops the action when he finds out that Jaipal has kidnapped his son.

Dhirendra learns that Manupratap is the real father of the child. He decides to save the child, to give it to Janki and to let her live with Manupratap and her son. Dhirendra leaves to arrest Jaipal.

Manupratap promises Janki that her marriage will not be destroyed, and he sets out to save Dhirendra. Manupratap kills Jaipal.

Manupratap is injured by a gunshot when he protects Dhirendra from Jaipal's shot.

Manupratap tells Dhirendra that a man cannot be a father just because he sires a child and that Dhirendra can be the father of Janki's son. Manupratap dies in his arms. Dhirendra lets the child light the funeral pyre of Manupratap, and Bhanupratap understands the truth about the child on seeing Janki. Dhirendra unites with Manupratap's child and Janki.

== Cast ==
- Dharmendra as Manupratap "Manu" Singh
- Vinod Khanna as Bhanupratap Singh / Bhavani
- Rajesh Khanna as Inspector / SP Dhirendra Singh
- Hema Malini as Janki Singh
- Ranjeeta as Kamli
- Tina Munim as Jaya
- Ranjeet as Raja Jaipal Singh
- Rehman as Thakur Pratap Singh
- Nazir Hussain as Police Commissioner Siddheshwar Singh
- Iftekhar as Ram Avtar Singh
- Mohan Sherry as Diwanji
- Indrani Mukherjee as Roopmati
- Om Shivpuri as Thakur Sangram Singh
- Murad as Raja Sahib
- Tej Sapru as Jaipal's nephew
- Vishal Singh

== Music ==
All songs were composed by Laxmikant–Pyarelal and lyrics, by Anand Bakshi.

Song	Singer
"Akela Gaya Tha Main" - 1	Kishore Kumar
"Akela Gaya Tha Main" - 2	Kishore Kumar
"Yahi Pe Humko Jeena Hain, Yahi Pe Humko Marna Hain"	Mahendra Kapoor, Manhar Udhas, Hemlata
"Bhaagi Re Bhaagi Re Bhaagi Brijbala, Kanha Ne Pakda, Rang Dala"	Asha Bhosle, Mahendra Kapoor, Manhar Udhas, Dilraj Kaur
"Doli Doli Ho Doli"	Mohammed Rafi
"Kahaniyan Sunati Hai"	Mohammed Rafi
