= Dastoor =

Indian Television Series

- Written by: Dr. F.S. Shirani
- Directed by: Gurbir Singh Grewal
- Starring: see below
- Opening theme: "Dastoor"
- Country of origin: India
- Original language: Hindi

Production
- Producers: Salma Siddiqui, Akbar Rashid
- Running time: 25 minutes

Original release
- Network: DD National
- Release: 1997 – 1998

Dustoor (Hindi:; literally Foundation) is an Indian television drama-series that was directed by Gurbir Singh Grewal of Neem ka Ped fame. The series was written by Dr.F.S.Shirani. Kahani Ghar Ghar Ki famous TV actress Sakshi Tanwar started her career from this serial. Dastoor first aired in 1997–98 on DD National.

== Cast ==
- Sakshi Tanwar
- Shad Khan (Actor)
- S M Zaheer
- Alka Amin
- Hema Singh
- Sanjay Sharma
- Arun Bali
- Hemant Mishra
- Babla Kochhar
