= Sushma Seth =

Indian actress (born 1936)

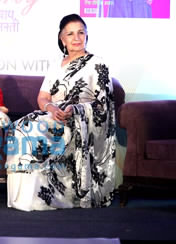
- Sushma Seth in 2013
- Born: 20 June 1936 (age 90); Delhi, British India
- Occupation: Actress
- Years active: 1956–2018
- Spouse: Dhruv Seth
- Children: 3
- Relatives: Divya Seth (daughter)

Sushma Seth (born 20 June 1936) is an Indian stage, film and television actress. She started her career in the 1950s, and was a founder member of the Delhi-based theatre group Yatrik. Her first film was Junoon in 1978. She is known for playing a mother and grandmother role in movies and on television, and notable for her role as Dadi in the pioneering TV soap Hum Log (1984–1985). She received a nomination for the Filmfare Award for Best Supporting Actress for her performance as Ameena Bai in B. R. Chopra's drama Tawaif (1985). She has worked with famous directors like Dev Raj Ankur, Ram Gopal Bajaj, Manish Joshi Bismil and Chander Shekhar Sharma.

== Early and personal life ==
Brought up in Delhi she completed her schooling at Convent of Jesus and Mary, New Delhi. Thereafter Sushma did a teachers training diploma in home science, Lady Irwin College, New Delhi, Associate in Science diploma, Briarcliff College, New York, and later, Bachelor of Fine Arts, from Carnegie Mellon, Pittsburgh, United States.

Sushma Seth and her husband, businessman Dhruv Seth, have three children. Among them is actress Divya Seth, who acted alongside her mother in Hum Log and Dekh Bhai Dekh.

== Career ==
Seth started her career on stage in the 1950s. With Joy Michael, Rati Bartholomew, Roshan Seth and others, she was one of the founders of the Delhi-based theatre group Yatrik in 1964. In addition to acting, she has directed many plays. In the 1970s, she founded and ran the Children's Creative Theatre, an ensemble that put up plays and conducted workshops for children.

She made her big screen debut with Shyam Benegal's 1978 period film Junoon, in which she played Shashi Kapoor's aunt. She has starred in some of the biggest hits in the Indian industry including Silsila, Prem Rog, Ram Teri Ganga Maili, Chandni, Deewana, Kabhi Khushi Kabhie Gham and Kal Ho Naa Ho. She also appeared in the Punjabi film Chann Pardesi (1980).

She received a nomination for the Filmfare Award for Best Supporting Actress for her performance as Ameena Bai in B. R. Chopra's drama Tawaif (1985). She has played the mother and grandmother of many Bollywood performers including Rishi Kapoor, Akshay Kumar, Shahrukh Khan, Hrithik Roshan, Anil Kapoor and Preity Zinta.

Seth appeared in the TV sitcom Dekh Bhai Dekh (1993), directed by Anand Mahendroo, where she played the matriarch of the Divan family. She has also worked with theatre directors like Ram Gopal Bajaj and Manish Joshi Bismil. She is notable for her performance on the TV soap Hum Log, telecast in the early 80s on Doordarshan, in which she played Daadi (the grandmother). Seth was so popular that her character, who was shown suffering from throat cancer, had to be extended on viewer's demand.

Since the early 2000s, Seth has been working with an NGO called Arpana, directing plays and dance dramas. She has written a play called Sitaron Ke Paas inspired by the life of astronaut Kalpana Chawla.

== Filmography ==
- Junoon (1978) as Javed's chachi
- Chann Pardesi (1980) as Jassi (Punjabi movie)
- Kalyug (1981) as Savitri
- Silsila (1981)
- Swami Dada (1982) as Seema's mom
- Prem Rog (1982) as Badi Maa
- Aparoopa (1982) as Rana's mother
- Romance (1983) as Mrs. Roy
- Naukar Biwi Ka (1983) as Sandhya's foster mom
- Salma (1985) as Mrs. Bakar Ali
- Khamosh (1985) as Leela
- Tawaif (1985) as Nadira
- Ram Teri Ganga Maili (1985) as Naren's Grandmother
- Meraa Ghar Mere Bachche (1985)
- Wafadaar (1985) as Mrs. Namdev
- Faasle (1985)
- Alag Alag (1985) as Neeraj's mom
- Maa Kasam (1985) as Thakurain
- Palay Khan (1986) as Fatima Khalim
- Nagina (1986) as Rajiv's mother
- Kala Dhanda Goray Log (1986) as Mrs. Durga
- Janbaaz (1986) as Laxmi Singh
- Pyar Kiya Hai Pyar Karenge (1986) as Annapurnadevi
- Naache Mayuri (1986)
- Mard Ki Zabaan (1987)
- Khudgarz (1987) as Sita Sinha
- Avam (1987) as Durga Jagrathan
- Apne Apne (1987) as Mrs. Kapoor
- Dharamyudh (1988) as Kundan's mother
- Aurat Teri Yehi Kahani (1988) as Jamunabai
- Aakhri Adaalat (1988) as Mrs. Kaushal
- Hum Farishte Nahin (1988) as Supriya
- Waaris (1988) as Paro's mom
- Suryaa: An Awakening (1989) as Salma Khan
- Mitti Aur Sona (1989) as Mrs. Yashoda Bhushan
- Gharana (1989) as Shraddha
- Kasam Suhaag Ki (1989)
- Bade Ghar Ki Beti (1989) as Mrs. Din Dayal
- Toofan (1989) as Devyani
- Chandni (1989) as Mrs. Gupta
- Jawani Zindabad (1990) as Sharda Sharma
- Jaan-E-Wafa (1990)
- Amiri Garibi (1990) as Sona's Aunt
- Shankara (1991) as Rani Maa
- First Love Letter (1991) as Uma Devi
- Khoon Ka Karz (1991) as Savitri Devi
- Ajooba (1991) as Zarina Khan
- Do Matwale (1991) as Amar's Mother
- Maa as Heerabai
- Heer Ranjha (1992) as Heer's mom
- Suryavanshi (1992) as Rajmata
- Sarphira (1992) as Mrs. B.K. Sinha
- Inteha Pyar Ki (1992) as Mrs. Shankar Dayal Walia
- Deewana (1992) as Laxmi Devi
- Bol Radha Bol (1992) as Sumitra Malhotra
- Dil Aashna Hai (1992) as Mrs. Baig
- In Custody (1993) as Safiya Begum
- Pyaar Ka Tarana (1993)
- 1942: A Love Story (1993) as Gayatridevi Singh
- Tejasvini (1994) as grandma
- Daraar (1996) as Mrs. Malhotra
- Kareeb (1998) as Lata
- Bade Miyan Chote Miyan (1998) as Seema's mother
- Daag: The Fire (1999) as Dai
- Taal (1999) as Mrs. Mehta
- Chal Mere Bhai (2000) as Grandmother
- Dhadkan (2000) as Vibha Verma, Ram's stepmother
- Dhaai Akshar Prem Ke (2000) as Yogi's mom
- Shikari (2000) as Rajeshwari's mother
- Raja Ko Rani Se Pyar Ho Gaya (2000) as Manisha's Mother
- Moksha: Salvation (2001) as Ritika's grandmother
- Kabhi Khushi Kabhie Gham (2001) as Kaur, Nandini's mother
- Tujhe Meri Kasam (2003) as grandmother
- Rasikan Re (2003)
- Kal Ho Naa Ho (2003) as Lajoji
- Pal Pal Dil Ke Ssaat (2009)
- Student Of The Year (2012)
- Shaandaar (2015)
- Tamasha (2015)
- Noor (2017)
- Mehram (2018) as Noor Bibi, short film released on ZEE5

=== Television ===
- Staying On (1980) as Codcod Menektara
- Hum Log (1984) as Dadi
- Dekh Bhai Dekh (1993) as Sarla Diwan
- Amma and Family (1995) as Ammi
- Miilee (2005)
- Kash-m-Kash
- Ret Par Likhe Naam
- Qaid
- Kaun
- Yeh Hui Na Baat
- Dard ka Rishta (2014) as Ganga Dindyal Sharma
- Alibaba
- Vansh
- Aradhana
- Tanha
- Zanjeerein
- Star Bestsellers
- Ret Par Likhe Naam
- Ret Par Likhe Naam
