= Chann Pardesi =

1981 film

- Directed by: Chitrartha Singh
- Screenplay by: Ravinder Peepat
- Story by: Baldev Gill
- Produced by: Mrs. Swarn Sedha; Yog Raj Sedha; Baldev Gill; J. S. Cheema; Dr. Chanan Singh Sidhu; Simran Sidhu; Harjit Gill
- Starring: Raj Babbar; Rama Vij; Kulbhushan Kharbanda; Amrish Puri; Om Puri
- Cinematography: Manmohan Singh
- Edited by: Subhash Sehgal
- Music by: Surinder Kohli
- Release date: 10 July 1981
- Running time: 147 mins
- Country: India
- Language: Punjabi

Chann Pardesi is a Punjabi language film released in 1981. It was directed by Chitrarth Singh and starred Raj Babbar, Rama Vij, Amrish Puri, Kulbhushan Kharbanda and Om Puri.

Chann Pardesi was a seminal film that debuted many future Bollywood legends both in front of and behind the camera, and was Raj Babbar's first ever Punjabi film.

== Awards ==
Chann Pardesi won India's National Film Award in 1980 and went on to become a big commercial success when it eventually found distribution in 1981.

== Plot ==
Harnek Singh (a.k.a. Nek) (Kulbhushan Kharbanda) is an honest farm worker from the village who works hard for his employer, Jagirdar Joginder Singh (Amrish Puri). Nek is in love with the village belle, Kammo (Rama Vij), and hopes to marry her after he accumulates enough money and some land. One day the Jagirdar asks his assistant, Tulsi (Om Puri), to send Nek out of the village for a few days. Upon Nek's return home, Joginder is pleased with him and allocates six acres of land so that he can be independent and marry Kammo. A delighted Nek marries Kammo and they settle down to a harmonious married lifestyle. Soon Kammo gives birth to a son, Laali (Raj Babbar). It is then that their world is turned upside down when Nek finds out that the child is not his but that of Joginder, who had raped Kammo in his absence. Angered, Nek kills a man named Kanhaiya, is arrested, tried in Court, and sentenced to 20 years in prison. Nek breaks off all ties with Kammo, suspecting her of infidelity.

Years later, grown up Laali is in love with a beautiful girl named Channi (Sunita Dheer), whom he wants to marry. When he tells his mother about this, she refuses to giver her permission and blessings, but instead wants him to marry another village girl Nimmo (Rajni Sharma), whom she approves of.

Watch what happens when Laali discovers the reason why his mother does not approve of Channi. Laali brought the money to Jagirdar Joginder Singh for Channi's wedding as Laali considers her like a sister since they are best friends and Tulsi (Om Puri) was going to take the money away before Laali beat up Tulsi and then Joginder fires at Tulsi as his enemy and the terrible secret (of Joginder being Laali's biological father) comes out before Jagirdar goes to jail before Channi's wedding. Harnek Singh (alias Nek) return to the village during Channi's wedding and quit shooting people since Joginder was already in jail and then remain relationship with his wife Kammo and son Laali after 20 years of prison instead of separating his family.

== Cast ==
- Rama Vij as Kammo
- Raj Babbar as Laali
- Kulbhushan Kharbanda as Harnek/Nek
- Amrish Puri as Jangirdar Joginder Singh
- Om Puri as Tulsi
- Sushma Seth as Jassi (Joginder Singh's wife)
- Sunita Dheer as Channi
- Mehar Mittal as Pappu
- Rajni Sharma as Nimmo
- Sunder (actor) as Hawaldaar

== Songs ==
No.	Title	Singers	Length
1.	"Na rus here meriye main ranjhan tera"	Mohammed Rafi	7:29
2.	"Kithe vekh sajan"	Asha Bhosle	5:49
3.	"Roj takdi phiran"	Dilraj Kaur, Anwar (singer)	4:50
4.	"Maae Na Wat Poonian (Doli)"	Mohammed Rafi	4:30
5.	"Sajna ve Sajna"	Dilraj Kaur	5:14
6.	"Tappe"	Manmohan Singh	6:41
7.	"Dil Darya Samundron Doonghe and Medley songs"	Savita Suman, Surinder Kohli and Manmohan Singh	5:51
