= Shakti (1982 film) =

- Directed by: Ramesh Sippy
- Written by: Salim–Javed
- Produced by: Mushir-Riaz
- Starring: Dilip Kumar; Amitabh Bachchan; Rakhee Gulzar; Smita Patil; Kulbhushan Kharbanda; Amrish Puri
- Cinematography: S.M. Anwar
- Edited by: M. S. Shinde
- Music by: R.D. Burman
- Production company: M. R. Productions
- Distributed by: M. R. Productions
- Release date: 1 October 1982
- Running time: 167 mins
- Country: India
- Language: Hindi

Shakti (transl. Strength) is a 1982 Indian Hindi-language crime drama film, directed by Ramesh Sippy, written by the Salim–Javed duo, and produced by Mushir-Riaz. It stars Dilip Kumar, Amitabh Bachchan, Rakhee Gulzar, Smita Patil, Kulbhushan Kharbanda and Amrish Puri. Shakti was notable for being the first and only film to feature veteran actors Kumar and Bachchan together on screen. Considered to be one of the greatest films in the history of Indian cinema, it went on to win four Filmfare Awards, for Best Film, Best Screenplay, Best Sound Editing, and Best Actor for Kumar. It was inspired by the Tamil film Thangappathakkam.

The film was the 9th highest grossing Hindi film of 1982. Kumar and Bachchan were both nominated for the Filmfare Award for Best Actor, which Kumar won. Talking about Bachchan's performance, Sippy said, "I don't think anyone else could’ve played the role the way Mr. Bachchan did. He had to play a hurt and wounded son."

== Plot ==
Retired Commissioner of Police Ashwini Kumar (Dilip Kumar) is at the railway station to receive his teenage grandson Ravi, who has just returned after completing his B.A. exams. On being asked by his grandfather about his future plans, Ravi promptly replies that he wants to become a police officer and serve his country, just like his grandfather. Kumar tells him that the journey of being a police officer is fraught with many arduous challenges, and Ravi should reconsider his decision. Kumar starts by explaining his own life story in a flashback.

Kumar had a happy family consisting of him, Sheetal, Ravi's grandmother, and son Vijay, Ravi's father. In the course of purging the city of crime, Ashwini takes up cudgels against a dreaded gangster named J.K. Verma. He arrests a key henchman of J.K. named Yashwant in order to decimate J.K.'s supremacy. However, J.K. takes matters into his own hands and abducts Vijay. J.K. calls up Ashwini and tries to strike a deal: Yashwant's freedom in lieu of Vijay's life. Ashwini, a virtuous cop, tells J.K. on the phone that even if his only son is killed in the process, he will not betray the law. Unbeknownst to Ashwini, however, the conversation is being tape recorded. When Vijay listens to his father's voice on the tape recorder, he is shocked and pained to hear his father's words and his lackadaisical attitude towards his own flesh and blood.

With no help forthcoming, Vijay takes it upon himself to escape his abductors. Whilst the entire gang is searching for Vijay, K.D. Narang, another goon in J.K.'s gang, finds Vijay but pities the helpless child and helps him escape to safety. The police trace J.K.'s hideout, but find that Vijay is missing. Vijay manages to escape and reaches home safely, but Vijay slowly and surely distances himself from his father. Narang and J.K. become sworn enemies after J.K. discovers that Narang was behind Vijay's escape.

As the years pass by, Vijay, who has now become a young man, begins resenting his father and his father's love for upholding the law. During a chance encounter, Vijay rescues a young lady named Roma, Ravi's mother, from 4 rowdy men who try to molest her. Vijay and Roma begin to form a close relationship. During a job interview for the post of Assistant Manager of a Hotel, K.D. Narang, the owner of the hotel, happens to be passing by. He interjects in the interview and promptly hires Vijay. Vijay remembers K.D. Narang as the person who had saved his life and decides to work in whatever capacity required with the man he perceives he owes his life to.

The duo, J.K. and K.D., have now become sworn enemies in their illegal businesses, so J.K. decides to remove his thorns before they suck the blood out of him and his business. J.K. tries to get K.D. murdered, but Vijay rescues K.D. with his presence of mind. Vijay reminisces to K.D. how Vijay owes his life to K.D., and now Vijay becomes K.D.'s, right-hand man. J.K. is infuriated at his men for failing to kill Narang. His men tell him that Vijay spoiled the plan. Enraged, J.K. creates a plan to kill Vijay first, followed by Narang, and then Ashwini.

Ashwini resents the growing proximity between Vijay and K.D. Narang, so he asks Vijay to leave his house. Vijay moves in with Roma, and they start living together, without marriage. Sheetal tries to persuade her son to leave the path of wrong, but in vain. Later, Roma reveals to Vijay that she is pregnant with his child, who is Ravi, so Vijay marries her. One night, while Vijay and Roma are at a restaurant, a drunk man named Ganpat Rai attempts to propose to Roma, but Vijay beats him up, causing two men dressed in blue clothes to come forward and escort Rai out of the hotel. It turns out that these two men hired Rai to act foolish and drunk. A few minutes later, one of the men stabs Rai to death. The next morning Vijay returns home, but Ashwini's men follow him. Ashwini's most loyal officer, Sudhakar, possesses a warrant claiming Vijay had murdered Rai. Vijay is taken into police custody, but when the charges are determined false, Vijay is released from prison, and he begins to work with K.D. full-time.

When Narang's truck of goods is stolen by J.K., Vijay requests Narang to bring his truck back to him, but alone, to which Narang agrees. When Vijay sees J.K. passing by, he captures him. Vijay tells J.K. that he was the same boy whom J.K. had abducted from school, and that he has been waiting for his revenge for years, much to J.K.'s horror. After a heated battle with J.K.'s men, Vijay drives Narang's truck back to him. When journalists cross-question Ashwini about his conflict of interest - his own son being a renowned gangster in K.D.'s gang, but he is the Deputy Commissioner of Police - the Commissioner of Police (Ashok Kumar) asks Ashwini to forego the case. Ashwini, however, requests 48 hours to capture and bring Vijay and the other nefarious gangsters to justice, failing which Ashwini will resign. K.D., Vijay and most of J.K.'s gangsters are arrested, but J.K. remains absconding. J.K. takes it upon himself to eliminate his troubles once and for all by murdering Ashwini. Instead, Sheetal is killed by J.K. himself whilst trying to shield her husband. An enraged Vijay, who is imprisoned at the time of Sheetal's murder, escapes the police and proceeds to start hunting for J.K.'s head. Vijay finds a den where four of J.K.'s men are present. Vijay tells them he has nothing against them, and only wants J.K., but the gangsters attempt to murder him. However, Vijay succeeds in killing all of the men. During the interrogation of one of J.K.'s henchmen, Vijay learns that J.K. has plans to leave India using fake credentials. Vijay then kills the man, who drowns.

Following up on the tip, Vijay arrives at the airport, and ultimately succeeds in killing J.K., who is in a disguise, thereby avenging his mother's death. Ashwini succeeds in tracking down Vijay and asks Vijay not to escape, but in vain. A teary-eyed Ashwini pulls the trigger, mortally wounding his son in the process. Ashwini rushes towards him, and in a tearful goodbye, Vijay realizes his mistake and asks for forgiveness, saying to his father that he always loved him very much.

The scene cuts to the present, and a tearful Ashwini reiterates to Ravi, asking him whether he wants to follow his decision to be a police officer. Ravi, despite hearing the heartbreaking story, firmly replies in the affirmative. Kumar and Roma, Ravi's mother, Vijay's widow give Ravi their blessings. Ravi takes a train and leaves, signifying that he would become an officer in the future....

== Cast ==
- Dilip Kumar as DCP Ashwini Kumar
- Amitabh Bachchan as Vijay Kumar, Ashwini and Sheetal's son, Roma's husband, Ravi's father
- Rakhee Gulzar as Sheetal Kumar, Ashwini's wife
- Smita Patil as Roma, Vijay's wife
- Kulbhushan Kharbanda as K. D. Narang
- Amrish Puri as J. K. Verma, The Main Antagonist
- Ashok Kumar as Commissioner of Police Peter Fernandes (special appearance)
- Anil Kapoor as Ravi Kumar, Vijay and Roma's son (guest appearance)
- Sharat Saxena as Lobo, Narang's assistant
- Dalip Tahil as Ganpat Rai
- Satish Shah as Satish, goon in local train
- Sudhir Pandey as Prakash
- Goga Kapoor as Yashwant
- Chandrashekhar as Senior Police Officer Surinder Kapoor
- Vikas Anand as Sudhakar, Police Inspector

== Production ==
The role of Vijay was initially to be played by Raj Babbar and he took an advance, but after Amitabh Bachchan showed interest in the role, Babbar was dropped. Rakhee Gulzar has stated that people warned her that portraying Bachchan's mother would ruin her career, but she did not care as she was delighted at the prospect of acting with Dilip Kumar who portrayed her character's husband.

== Awards ==
Both Dilip Kumar and Amitabh Bachchan were nominated for the Best Actor award, but it was Dilip Kumar who eventually won it Bachchan had a total of three nominations in the category that year.

The film was critically acclaimed and won many accolades, which are listed below:

Year	Awards	Category	Nominee	Result
1983	Filmfare Awards	Best Film	Mushir Alam, Mohammad Riaz	Won
1983	Filmfare Awards	Best Actor	Dilip Kumar	Won
1983	Filmfare Awards	Best Screenplay	Salim-Javed	Won
1983	Filmfare Awards	Best Sound Design	P. Harikishan	Won
1983	Filmfare Awards	Best Director	Ramesh Sippy	Nominated
1983	Filmfare Awards	Best Actor	Amitabh Bachchan	Nominated
1983	Filmfare Awards	Best Actress	Raakhee	Nominated
1983	Filmfare Awards	Best Story	Salim-Javed	Nominated

== Soundtrack ==
The song "Jane Kaise Kab Kahan" is an evergreen hit.

All lyrics are written by Anand Bakshi; all music is composed by R.D. Burman.

No.	Title	Singer(s)	Length
1.	"Jane Kaise Kab Kahan"	Kishore Kumar, Lata Mangeshkar
2.	"Hamne Sanam Ko Khat Likha"	Lata Mangeshkar
3.	"Ae Aasman Bata"	Mahendra Kapoor
4.	"Mangi Thi Ek"	Mahendra Kapoor

Vocals were supplied by Kishore Kumar (for Bachchan), Lata Mangeshkar (for Patil) and Mahendra Kapoor (for Dilip Kumar).

== Box office ==
As per Bollywood Hungama, Shakti's lifetime collection was ₹ 8 crore.
