= Kulbhushan Kharbanda =

Indian actor (b. 1944)

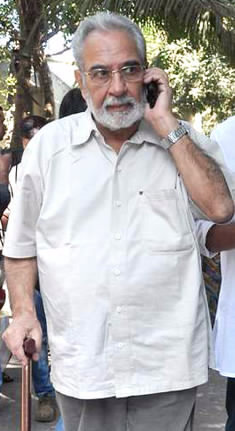
- Kulbhushan Kharbanda in 2012
- Born: 21 October 1944 (age 82); Hasan Abdal, Punjab, British India
- Education: Kirori Mal College (Delhi University)
- Occupation: Actor
- Years active: 1970–present

Kulbhushan Kharbanda (born 21 October 1944) is an Indian actor who works in Hindi and Punjabi films. He is best known for his role as the antagonist Shakaal in Shaan (1980), Starting off with the Delhi-based theatre group borkh in 1974. He worked in several parallel cinema films before working in the mainstream Hindi film industry. He appeared in Mahesh Bhatt's classic Arth (1982), Ek Chadar Maili Si (1986), Waaris (1988), and in all three parts of Deepa Mehta's Elements trilogy: Fire (1996), Earth (1998), and Water (2005). After nearly two decades he was seen on the theatre stage at the Padatik Theatre in Kolkata in the production of Atmakatha, directed by Vinay Sharma.

== Early life and education ==
Kharbanda was born in Hasan Abdal, Punjab, British India (now in Pakistan). His family migrated to India following the Partition of India. They shifted to several cities; thus he received his schooling in Jodhpur, Dehradun and Delhi, and also attended Minto Circle School (Aligarh Muslim University) in Aligarh. He later graduated from Kirori Mal College, University of Delhi, where he joined the theatre group Abhiyan, formed by senior students.

== Career ==
After his studies he and a few of his college friends formed a theatre group called "Abhiyaan", and then joined Delhi-based "Yatrik", a bilingual theatre repertory founded by director Joy Michael in 1964; he became its first paid artiste, though after a few years Yatrik collapsed as the director was lecturing in US universities. That is when he moved to Kolkata in 1972 and started working with the theatre group Padatik which did Hindi theatre, under director Shyamanand Jalan. Here he worked for a while before moving on to Mumbai and films.

He first got noticed in Nishaant (1974) by Shyam Benegal, with whom he went on to work in several more films including Manthan (1976), Bhumika: The Role (1977), Junoon (1978), and Kalyug (1980). Soon he was a regular with parallel cinema directors, like in Godhuli (1977) with B. V. Karanth.

Playing the bald villain Shakaal in Shaan (1980) directed by Ramesh Sippy, he saw his transition into mainstream cinema. Kharbanda went on to appear in Shakti (1982), Ghayal (1990), Jo Jeeta Wohi Sikandar (1992), Gupt (1997), Border (1997), Yes Boss (1997) and Refugee (2000). However, he continued appearing in art films such as Chakra (1981), with Smita Patil and Naseeruddin Shah, Arth (1982), with Shabana Azmi, Andhi Gali (1984), the first Hindi film of Buddhadeb Dasgupta, Ek Chadar Maili Si (1986), with Hema Malini, Utsav (1984), by Girish Karnad, Mandi (1983), Trikal (1985), Susman (1987), by Shyam Benegal, Naseem (1995), by Saeed Akhtar Mirza and Monsoon Wedding (2001) directed by Mira Nair.

He portrayed Reema Lagoo's husband and Raj Babbar's brother in Shashi Kapoor's Filmwalas Productions' Kalyug. He has also appeared in period films such as Jodha Akbar and Lagaan.

He has acted in a number of Punjabi films. He portrayed the hero in the legendary film Chan Pardesi (1980) and starred in the Punjabi comedy Mahaul Theek Hai (1999).

He has acted in six of Deepa Mehta's movies and all her trilogy films: Earth, Fire and Water. He did a German film in 2009.

He has acted in TV serials, such as Shanno Ki Shaadi and Mahi Ve.

He has been seen on the stage in plays such as Teen Farishtay, Hatya ek akaar ki, Baki Itihaas, Ek Shunya Bajirao, Guinea Pig, Girdhade, Sakharam Binder and, recently, Atmakatha.

Lately he even ventured into webseries and shortfilms like Love Shots where he was paired opposite his counterpart and co-star Farida Jalal with whom he shares great chemistry since years and they have worked together a lot since years. Both of them received applauds for their role in Love Shots by YRF as well which brought them back on screens as a couple in a new look after a long hiatus in a different story.

== Filmography ==
=== Television + web series ===
| Year | Show | Role |
|---|---|---|
| 1997 | Yeh Hai Mere Apne | |
| 1999 | Shapath | |
| 2002 | Tu Kahe Agar | Vishal's Tauji |
| 2016 | Love Shots | Mr. Chowdhury |
| 2018-2020 | Mirzapur | Satyanand Tripathi aka Bauji |
| 2020 | A Suitable Boy | Karim Chand Seth aka Lata's Nanaji |
| 2021 | The Tattoo Murders | Retired DCP Ajay Yagnik |
| 2022 | Guilty Minds | L N Khanna |

=== Hindi films ===
| Year | Film | Role |
|---|---|---|
| 1974 | Jadu Ka Shankh | |
| 1975 | Nishaant | Police Patel |
| 1976 | Manthan | |
| 1977 | Bhumika: The Role | Film Producer Harilal |
| 1977 | Godhuli | |
| 1978 | Junoon | |
| 1979 | Solva Saawan | |
| 1980 | Shaan | Shakaal |
| 1981 | Bulundi | Viju Mohanti |
| 1981 | Kalyug | |
| 1981 | Nakhuda | |
| 1981 | Kalyug | |
| 1981 | Chakra | |
| 1981 | Silsila | Officer Kulbhushan |
| 1982 | Aparoopa | |
| 1982 | Prem Rog | |
| 1982 | Shakti | K.D. Narang |
| 1982 | Arth | Inder Malhotra |
| 1983 | Mandi | |
| 1984 | Andhi Gali | |
| 1984 | Duniya | Teja |
| 1984 | Utsav | |
| 1985 | Ghulami | Constable Gopi Dada |
| 1985 | Lava | Kul Verma |
| 1985 | Zamana | G.D. |
| 1985 | Ram Teri Ganga Maili | |
| 1985 | Mera Muqaddar | Vijay |
| 1985 | Trikal | |
| 1986 | Janbaaz | Mr. Rai |
| 1986 | New Delhi Times | |
| 1986 | Ek Chadar Maili Si | Trilok |
| 1987 | Sheela | |
| 1987 | Jaan Hatheli Pe | Shankar Chinoy |
| 1987 | Uttar Dakshin | |
| 1987 | Susman | |
| 1988 | Waaris | Thakur Gajjan Singh |
| 1988 | Hum To Chale Pardes | Kul |
| 1988 | Main Zinda Hoon | |
| 1988 | Veerana | Thakur Mahendra Pratap |
| 1989 | Joshilaay | Raja Singh / Raja Sahib |
| 1990 | Ghayal | Police Commissioner Ashok Pradhan |
| 1990 | Pratibandh | |
| 1990 | Paap Ki Kamaee | Supremo |
| 1991 | Antarnaad | |
| 1991 | Henna | |
| 1992 | Jo Jeeta Wohi Sikandar | |
| 1992 | Bekhudi | |
| 1993 | Game | |
| 1993 | Damini | |
| 1993 | Ek Hi Raasta | |
| 1993 | Apaatkaal | Police Commissioner |
| 1993 | Mahakaal | Anita's Father |
| 1993 | Shaktiman | |
| 1994 | Mohra | Jailor |
| 1995 | Baazi | Police Commissioner Majumdar |
| 1995 | Veergati | Godbole - Parvati 's husband, Sandhya 's biological father and Ajay's adoptive father |
| 1995 | Naseem | |
| 1996 | Nirbhay | |
| 1996 | Loafer | |
| 1996 | Fire | |
| 1997 | Border | |
| 1998 | China Gate | |
| 1999 | Hote Hote Pyar Ho Gaya | Colonel |
| 1999 | Teri Mohabbat Ka Naam | Subhash |
| 2000 | Bulandi | |
| 2000 | Hera Pheri | Devi Prasad |
| 2000 | Pukar | |
| 2001 | Monsoon Wedding | |
| 2001 | Lagaan | Raja Puran Singh |
| 2003 | Taj Mahal: A Monument of Love | Jahangir |
| 2003 | Basti | |
| 2003 | Pinjar | |
| 2004 | I - Proud To Be An Indian | I's father |
| 2004 | Garv | |
| 2004 | Agnipankh | |
| 2005 | Zameer | |
| 2005 | Netaji Subhas Chandra Bose: The Forgotten Hero | |
| 2005 | Water | |
| 2006 | Fight Club | |
| 2006 | Lage Raho Munna Bhai | Khurana |
| 2006 | Umrao Jaan | |
| 2007 | Manorama Six Feet Under | |
| 2008 | EMI | |
| 2008 | Ek | |
| 2008 | Jodhaa Akbar | |
| 2008 | Ru Ba Ru | |
| 2009 | Team | |
| 2009 | Aloo Chaat | |
| 2009 | Kurbaan | |
| 2010 | Khatta Meetha | Ramakant Tichkule |
| 2011 | Khushiyaan | |
| 2012 | Midnight's Children | |
| 2012 | Delhi in a Day | |
| 2014 | Zed Plus | |
| 2014 | Haider | |
| 2015 | Brothers | |
| 2016 | Azhar | |
| 2018 | Soorma | |
| 2019 | Manikarnika | |
| 2019 | No Fathers in Kashmir | |
| 2019 | Khandaani Shafakhana | Hakim Tarachand |
| 2022 | Ardh | |
| 2024 | Crew | Sadanand Gowda aka Nanu |
| 2025 | Jewel Thief | Jayant Roy |
| 2026 | Mirzapur | Satyanand "Bauji" Tripathi |

=== Other language films ===
| Year | Film | Role | Language |
|---|---|---|---|
| 1981 | Chann Pardesi | | Punjabi |
| 1982 | Ucha Dar Babe Nank Da | | Punjabi |
| 1988 | Trinetrudu | | Telugu |
| 2010 | Nirdoshi | Deshmukh | Kannada |
| 2013 | Saadi Love Story | Mr. Brar | Punjabi |
| 2014 | Kirpaan | | Punjabi |
| 2016 | Dictator | | Telugu |
| 2016 | Aatishbazi Ishq | | Punjabi |
| 2021 | Pashmina | Directed by Danish Renzu and co-stars Aditi Rao Hydari, Farida Jalal etc | Urdu |

== Awards and nominations ==
| Year | Award | Category | Film | Result |
|---|---|---|---|---|
| 1986 | Filmfare Awards | Best Supporting Actor | Ghulami | Nominated |
| 2002 | IIFA Awards | Best Supporting Actor | Lagaan | Nominated |
