= Yatrik (theatre group) =

Yatrik is a repertory theatre company based in New Delhi, India. Established in 1964, it was Delhi's first bi-lingual theatre group, its founders were Joy Michael, Roshan Seth, Sushma Seth, Nigam Prakash, Kusum Haidar, Rati Bartholomew, Sneih Das and Marcus Murch. Over the decades, the group has staged plays in English, Hindi, Urdu and Punjabi, including Indian works, translations and adaptations of Western drama. It nurtured the early careers of many actors in theatre, TV and cinema.

== History ==
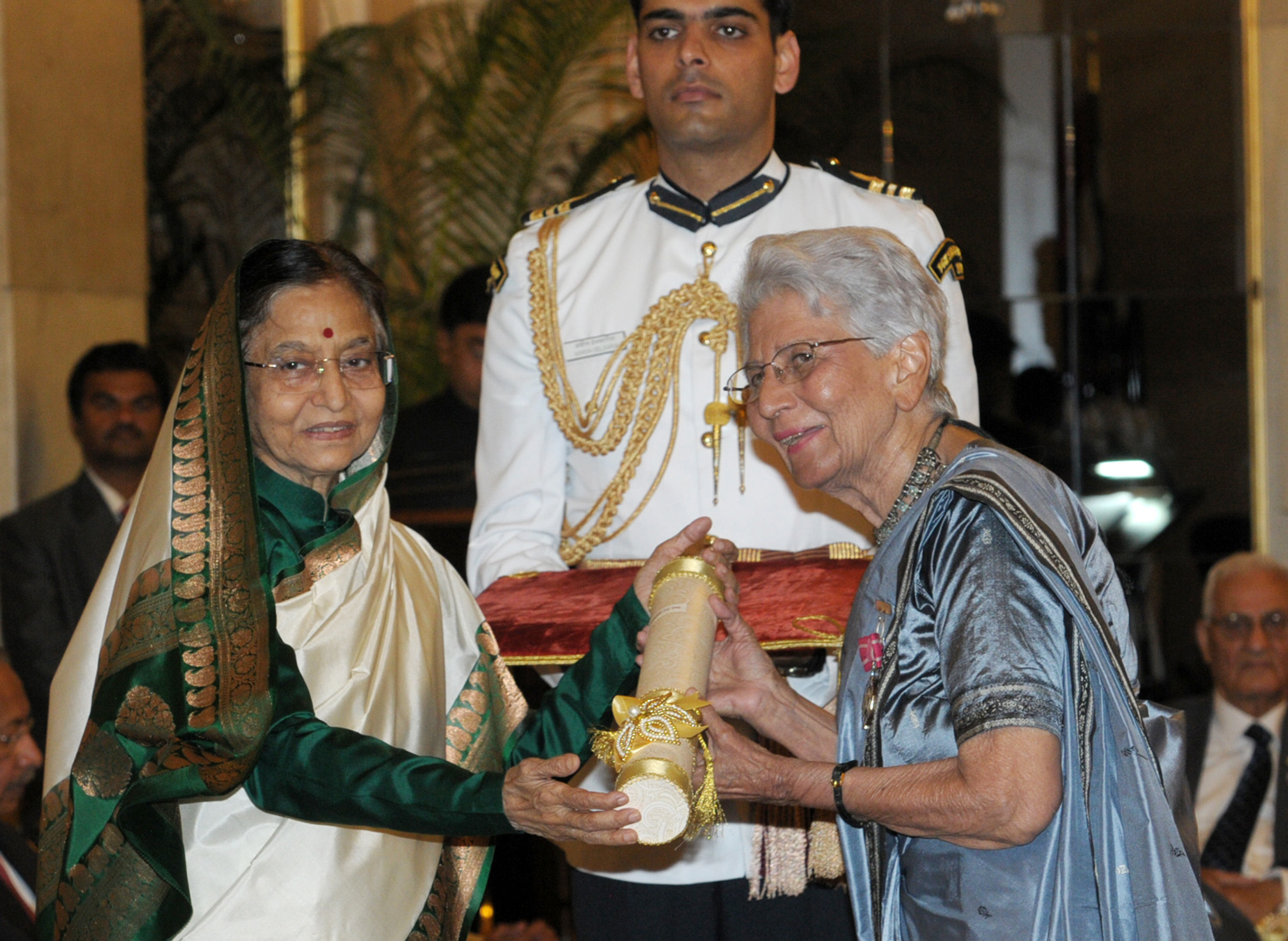
Founder of the group, Joy Michael receiving the Padma Shri 2012, from the President, 2012

Joy Michael, Sushma Seth, Roshan Seth and a few others had been working together with Tom Noonan (the then cultural attaché at United States Information Service, Delhi) in a play, 'Abe Lincoln in Illinois'. Noonan's retirement and the group's reluctance to disband led to the idea of 'Yatrik'. The idea emerged on a train ride from Dehradun to Delhi after a performance. Over the summer of 1963-64, members of the group contributed their personal resources and staged plays in Nainital, Mussoorie, and Dehradun, earning a profit of Rs. 2,000. With this, Yatrik was formally launched.

The repertory company, registered in August 1964, became the city's first professional theatre group. The group conducted weekend performances and rehearsals at a theatre on Mahadev Road near Gol Dak Khana.

Joy Michael (1927-2018) remained principal director of Yatrik for more than four decades and produced nearly 250 plays. She received the Sangeet Natak Akademi Award for Theatre Direction in 2009 and the Padma Shri in 2012. Other directors include Sabina Mehta Jaitly, Prakash Bhatia, Sunit Tandon, and Avijit Dutt. It has since staged over 300 plays in Hindi and English in India and internationally. Sunit Tandon was serving as its director in 2018.

== Artistes & Productions ==
=== Plays ===
Yatrik was launched with the performance of the Pulitzer Prize-winning"All the King's Men" (by Robert Penn Warren) and was directed by Marcus Murch.

- Antigone, (by Jean Anouilh) directed by Kusum Haidar
- Harvest, (by Manjula Padmanabhan) directed by Joy Michael
- Blood Wedding, directed by Kusum Haidar
- Stree directed by Joy Michael
- The Seagull (by Anton Chekov) directed by Joy Michael
- A Delicate Balance directed by Joy Michael

=== Artistes ===
E.Alkazi, Barry John, Kulbhushan Kharbanda, Zohra Sehgal, KK Kohli, Lola Chatterjee, Bhaskar Ghose

== Bibliography ==
- Yatrik: A Journey into Theatrical Art, Diwan Singh Bajeli, Niyogi Books, 2018. ISBN 9789386906311.
