= Amir Qazalbash =

Indian poet and lyricist (1943–2003)

Amir Qizilbash (1943 – 2003) was an Indian shayar (poet) and a film songs lyricist. He was born in Delhi, India in 1943 and died in 2003. He is well known for his lyrical work in Indian films Prem Rog (1982) and Ram Teri Ganga Maili (1985).

== Popular songs ==
- Meri Qismet Mein Tu Nahin Shaaid, sung by Suresh Wadkar and Lata Mangeshkar, music of Laxmikant–Pyarelal in film Prem Rog (1982)
- Mein Hi Mein Hoon, sung by Suresh Wadkar, music by Ravindra Jain in film Ram Teri Ganga Maili (1985)

== Poetry books ==
- Baaz Gasht (1974)
- Inkaar (1976)
- Shikayatein Meri (1979)
- Kulliyaat Amir Qazalbash (2006)
