= Aurat =

Aurat may refer to:

Aurat (word), the word for woman in many Asian languages

== Movements ==
- Aurat March, a women's procession walk in Pakistan
- Aurat Foundation, a women's rights organization in Delhi, India

== Films ==
- Aurat (1940 film), an Indian film directed by Mehboob Khan
- Aurat (1953 film), a Hindi film directed by B. Verma
- Aurat (1967 film), an Indian Hindi-language film directed by S. S. Balan
- Aurat Pair Ki Juti Nahin Hai, a 1985 Indian drama film directed by B.K. Adarsh
- Aurat (1986 film), by B. R. Ishaara and starring Zeenat Aman, see Zeenat Aman filmography
- Zakhmi Aurat, a 1988 Indian Hindi movie directed by Avtar Bhogal
- Aurat Teri Yehi Kahani (1954 film), a Hindi film directed by Chaturbhuj Doshi
- Aurat Teri Yehi Kahani, a 1988 Indian Bollywood film directed by Mohanji Prasad
- Aaj Kie Aurat, a 1993 Indian film
- Aurat Aurat Aurat, a 1996 Bollywood film directed by K. Vishwanath

== Television ==
- Adhoori Aurat, a 2013 Pakistani drama serial
- Aurat (TV series), a 1990s Doordarshan India TV series

== Other ==
- Awrah, or intimate parts in Islam
