= A Private Enterprise =

1974 film

- Poster
- Directed by: Peter K. Smith
- Screenplay by: Dilip Hiro; Peter K. Smith
- Produced by: Mamoun Hassan; Peter K. Smith
- Starring: Salmaan Peerzada; Diana Quick; Marc Zuber
- Cinematography: Ray Orton
- Edited by: Yves Langlois
- Music by: Ram Narayan; Sen Narayan
- Distributed by: 20th Century Fox
- Release date: 1974
- Running time: 78 minutes
- Country: United Kingdom
- Language: English

A Private Enterprise is a 1974 British film directed by Peter K. Smith and starring Salmaan Peerzada and Marc Zuber. It was written by Dilip Hiro and Smith, and produced by the British Film Institute. An Indian immigrant in Birmingham attempts to start his own business. It is regarded as the first British Asian film.

== Plot ==
Shiv Verma is an Asian immigrant working unhappily in a Birmingham factory. His dream is to run a plastics mouldings company. When his co-workers go on strike, Verma travels to London to meet the marriageable daughter of wealthy businessman Mr. Kapur, but finds her disappointing. On the train journey back he meets a student, Penny, and subsequently takes her out on a date, but realises she is attracted to the idea of dating Indian men, and not to him specifically. Verma goes to work in his uncle's factory, which later burns down.

== Cast ==
- Salmaan Peer as Shiv Verma
- Marc Zuber as Ashok
- Ramon Sinha as Uncle Ramji
- Shukla Bhattercharjee as Chandra
- Yehye Saeed as Chandra's father
- Subhash Luthra as Rattan Singh
- Diana Quick as Penny
- Dr Kaushik as guru
- Anthony Roye as estate agent
- Raymond Bowers as fish & chip shop man
- Chris Gannon as union official

== Reception ==
Caroline Lewis wrote in The Monthly Film Bulletin: "Despite the uneven way it moves from one illustrative episode to another, A Private Enterprise creates a genuine sympathy for this would-be private citizen and the double bind in which he finds himself. At the same time, whatever sympathy is evoked does not altogether square with indications that if Shiv's ambitions were realised, he might find himself the exploiter of his fellow immigrants. A certain lack of definition about Shiv's character, in fact, renders him more likeable than the director may originally have intended. Had the film been strengthened by having him take definite shape as an entrepreneur – an economic success rather than a social victim – he could no longer have been so sympathetic as a hero. A consequent irony that the film fails to explore is that even with economic well-being, Shiv might still remain a displaced alien; as it is, the film's most conspicuous symbol of success – the neatly turned caricature of Mr. Kapur – seems as blissfully content in his gimcrack display of wealth as any Tati-esque bourgeois in any western suburb."

Variety wrote: "Smith leads us from frustration to frustration with a minimum of heart-tugging and a great deal of restraint. Some of the situations he sets up seem forced – most notably Shiv's run-in with a trendy English girl who dates Indian men to be chic – but mostly concentrating on Shiv's alienation within the male Indian community, which is strike-crazy. Smith conveys a claustrophobia that is convincing. Film is carried by the performance of Peer, which is likable despite its woodenness, mainly because a good-naturedness shines through from start to finish. With this first film under his belt, director Smith is one director to watch – he is certainly ready for bigger and better things."

Michael Brooke wrote for the BFI: "Shot on a tiny budget for the British Film Institute Production Board. A Private Enterprise was the first British film to portray the lives and concerns of immigrants from the Indian subcontinent, as seen through the eyes of engineer Shiv Verma. ...Although director and co-writer Dilip Hiro (himself an immigrant from the Indian subcontinent, who would become a distinguished writer and political commentator) wanted to paint an honest portrait of the problems faced by the immigrant community, they also work in a great deal of warmth and humour. In particular, the film stresses the supportiveness of Indian families – Shiv has no shortage of offers of employment or even marriage. But he wants to be an individual in a system that values conformity, a dilemma that places him squarely in line with his British-born New Wave predecessors of a decade earlier and makes his origins almost irrelevant."

Time Out wrote: "A nicely quirky and human-scaled study of a young Birmingham Asian undergoing cultural dislocations as he tries to come to terms with trade union activity at work and the prospect of a prearranged marriage within his ethnic community. Smith's occasionally absurdist eye, and Peer's performance as the low-key hero determined to become an individual citizen rather than an immigration statistic, lift this low-budget first feature out of the problem pic rut."
