= Red Swastik =

- Directed by: Vinod Pande
- Written by: Vinod Pande
- Produced by: Vinod Pande; Ramon Omar
- Starring: Sherlyn Chopra; Harsh Chhaya; Deepshikha Nagpal; Vinod Pande
- Cinematography: Rakesh Kumar
- Music by: Shamir Tandon; John Paul; Ashutosh Singh
- Release date: 8 June 2007
- Running time: 131 minutes
- Country: India
- Language: Hindi

Red Swastik is a 2007 Indian Hindi psychological erotic thriller film directed by Vinod Pande. The movie was released on 8 June 2007 under the banner of Rainspirit Films.

== Plot ==
Sarika is a single mother who lives in Mumbai with her physically challenged daughter Anjali and works as an editor for a magazine. One day she gets a phone call from a female reader who is upset because her submission was not printed. The caller seems threatening so Sarika notifies her friend, D.C.P. Chaudhary, but he is unable to provide any assistance. Later, one night Sarika gets a visit from Chaudhary and Crime Branch Inspector Sunil Ranade, who inform her that a businessman had been brutally knifed to death with a blood-smeared swastika mark on his forehead. They inform her that they re-dialed the last number from the victim's phone number and found that it was her work number. They also informed her that they suspect that the killer is a woman who has killed another male in Delhi in a similar fashion and her modus operandi appears to be to kill married males who are unfaithful to their respective spouses. They provide her with a recording machine in case the killer calls again. The female does call again and attempts to befriend Sarika, but gets upset and evasive when questioned about her identity and whereabouts. Shortly thereafter the police find another dead male victim, but the killer never leaves any clues.

== Cast ==
- Deepshikha Nagpal as Sarika
- Sherlyn Chopra as Anamika / Smita / Zeenat / Rohini Mathur
- Harsh Chhaya as DCP Chaudhary
- Vinod Pande
- Deepraj Rana as Inspector Sunil Ranade (Crime Branch)
- Shanay Shah as son of Anamika
- Pankaj Kalra
