= Vinod Pande =

Indian actor, film director and film producer

Vinod Pande (also known as Vinod Pandey) is an Indian film director, actor, producer and writer.

== Biography ==
Pande was born in the state of Uttar Pradesh, where his father was working as a doctor at a government dispensary. Pande studied social work in Udaipur and came to Bombay in the early 1960s. There he worked for All India Radio, among others. In May 1966, he moved to London, where he worked at the advertising agency Image Enterprises, for which he made several commercials. He also worked as a Hindi news anchor at the BBC. For the British Film Institute he made his first documentary in Hindi, London Me Bharat, in 1972, which deals with the everyday life of South Asian British people in the London suburbs (Southall).

In 1980, he made his first Hindi film Ek Baar Phir, which was produced entirely in the UK. The film was denied permission to contest in the National Film Awards for this reason. Following this, Pande moved back to India. With Star (1982), he tried the form of the film musical in the western style. The film used the album Star/Boom Boom as its soundtrack. The album featured music composed by British-Indian producer Biddu, who was also the film's producer.

His film Sins (2005), which deals with the sexual relationship between a Catholic priest and a younger woman, provoked protests from Indian Christians. The film is based on a news story that Pande read in 1988 about a Kerala priest sentenced to death on sexual harassment and murder charges. The psychological thriller Red Swastik (2007), with model Sherlyn Chopra in the lead role, had scenes that were comparatively revealing for Indian films - after being raped, the protagonist takes revenge on her tormentors and kills them one after the other.

Pande is the author of three English-language novels: Don's Wife, Saanvri - The Story of a Concubine, and Destiny.

== Filmography ==
- 1972: London Me Bharat (documentary)
- 1979: Ek Baar Phir
- 1982: Yeh Nazdeekiyan
- 1982: Star
- 1988: Ek Naya Rishta
- 1990: Sach
- 1994: Reporter (TV series)
- 2005: Sins
- 2007: Red Swastik
- 2011: Chaloo Movie
- 2016: Panaah (short film)
