= Deepti Naval =

Indian-American actress (born 1952)

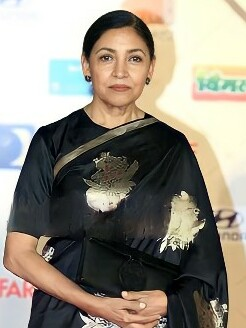
- Naval in 2024
- Born: 3 February 1952 (age 74); Amritsar, Punjab, India
- Other name: Dipti Naval
- Education: Hunter College
- Occupations: Actress; director; writer
- Years active: 1978–present
- Spouse: Prakash Jha (m. 1985; div. 2002)
- Children: 1

Deepti Naval (born 3 February 1952) is an Indian-American actress, director, and writer, predominantly active in Hindi cinema. One of the leading actresses of parallel Indian cinema, Naval is known for her portrayals of emotionally sensitive women in a range of films.

Her major contribution has been in the area of art cinema, winning critical acclaim for her sensitive and 'close to life' characters that emphasized the changing roles of women in India. She is the first Indian-American actress to make her debut in the Hindi film industry.

== Early life ==
Naval was born on 3 February 1952 in Amritsar, Punjab, India, but she later moved to New York City when her father got a teaching job at City University of New York in 1971. She studied fine arts at Hunter College.

== Acting career ==
Naval made her debut in 1978 with Shyam Benegal's film Junoon. Two years later, she played a lead role in Ek Baar Phir. Alongside Smita Patil and Shabana Azmi, she became an actress in 1980s Parallel cinema, playing roles in films like Kamla (1984) or Ankahee (1985).

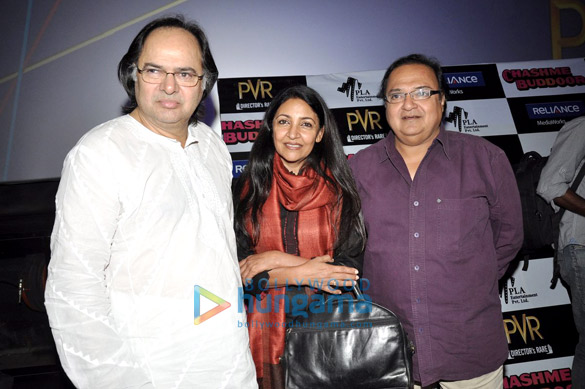
Farooq Sheikh, Deepti Naval and Rakesh Bedi at the special screening of Chashme Buddoor (2013)

Starting with Chashme Buddoor in 1981, she was often cast with Farooq Sheikh and they became an iconic on-screen couple of the early 1980s, with films such as Chashme Buddoor, Saath Saath, Kissi Se Na Kehna, Katha, Rang Birangi and Faasle. Three decades later, they reunited in Tell Me O Kkhuda (2011). Their last film together was Listen... Amaya which was released in 2013, the year Shaikh died.

While she was very prolific in the 1980s, her career slowed down in the 1990s and she explored other art forms. She came back in the 2000s with social dramas like Bawandar and Firaaq, and won Best Actress awards in several international film festivals for her roles in Leela (2002), Memories in March (2010) and Listen... Amaya (2013). She was also recognized as the 2007 Tribute Honoree of the Indian Film Festival of Los Angeles.

Mostly present in Hindi cinema, Naval also acted in other Indian languages, as with Marhi Da Deeva and Mane, which respectively won the award for Best Feature Film in Punjabi and Best Feature Film in Kannada at the 1990 National Film Awards ceremony. She was to make her debut in a Bengali movie under director Sanjoy Nag but the film - Memories in March - was eventually shot in English. She has also acted in Odia movie "Ei Sangharsh"(1990).

Naval has been active on TV with a few telefilms and serials such as Sauda (1992), Tanaav (1994) or Muqammal (2003). She came back in 2011 with the daily soap opera Mukti Bandhan on Colors TV. She made her theater debut in 2015 with the poetic stage show Ek Mulaqaat in which she played the celebrated Punjabi writer Amrita Pritam.

In 2019, Naval appeared in an episode of Made in Heaven, a web series on Amazon Prime directed by Zoya Akhtar.

== Other work ==
Naval made her directorial debut with Do Paise Ki Dhoop, Chaar Aane Ki Baarish starring Manisha Koirala and Rajit Kapur. The film won the Best Screenplay Award at the 2009 New York Indian Film Festival which released on Netflix in 2019. She also wrote and directed Thoda Sa Aasmaan, a TV serial centred around strong female characters, and produced a travel show, The Path Less Travelled.

Her first selection of poems in Hindi, Lamha Lamha was published in 1983. In 2004, MapinLit published a new collection called Black Wind and Other Poems. Naval is also the author of a collection of short stories, The Mad Tibetan, published in 2011.

Naval is also a painter and photographer with several exhibitions to her credit. Her works as a painter include the controversial Pregnant Nun. She also runs the Vinod Pandit Charitable Trust, set up in memory of her late companion, for the education of the girl child.

== Personal life ==
Naval was married to the filmmaker Prakash Jha and the two have an adopted daughter. Naval was later in a relationship with the late Vinod Pandit, the nephew of Pandit Jasraj. As of 2010, she is an American citizen.

== Awards ==
- 1988, Bengal Film Journalists' Association Awards, Best Supporting Actress, Mirch Masala
- 2003, Best Supporting Actress Award at the Karachi Film Festival
- 2012, Best Actress Award at the Imagine India Film Festival (Spain)
- 2013, Best Actress Award at the New York Indian Film Festival

== Filmography ==
=== Films ===
Year	Title	Role	Notes
1978	Junoon	Rashid's wife	
1979	Jallian Wala Bagh		
1980	Hum Paanch	Lajiya	
1980	Ek Baar Phir	Kalpana Kumar	
1981	Chashme Buddoor	Neha Rajan	
1981	Chirutha	Chirutha	
1982	Angoor	Tanu	
1982	Saath Saath	Geetanjali Gupta 'Geeta'	
1982	Shriman Shrimati	Veena	
1983	Rang Birangi	Anita Sood	
1983	Ek Baar Chale Aao	Gulab D. Dayal	
1983	Katha	Sandhya Sabnis	
1983	Kissi Se Na Kehna	Dr. Ramola Sharma	
1984	Mohan Joshi Hazir Ho!	Asha Joshi	
1984	Kanoon Kya Karega	Mrs. Anju Gautam Mehra	
1984	Kamla	Kamla	
1984	Hip Hip Hurray	Teacher Anuradha Roy	
1984	Yeh Ishq Nahin Aasaan	Sahira	
1984	Wanted: Dead or Alive	Angela	
1984	Andhi Gali		
1985	Damul	Mahatmain	
1985	Faasle	Sheetal	
1985	Telephone	Rajni	
1985	Cricketer	Sheela	
1985	Holi	Professor Sehgal	
1985	Ankahee	Indu Agnihotri	
1985	Aurat Pair Ki Juti Nahin Hai		
1986	Aashiana		
1986	Begaana	Asha	
1986	Nasihat	Sunita	
1987	Meraa Suhaag		Special appearance
1987	Mirch Masala	Saraswati, Mukhiya's wife	
1988	Abhishapt		
1988	Shoorveer	Nanda (Shankar's Wife)	
1988	Main Zinda Hoon	Bina Tiwari	
1989	Didi	Didi	Directed by Tapan Sinha
1989	Marhi Da Deeva	Bhan Kaur/Bhani	Punjabi film
1989	Jism Ka Rishta		
1990	Ei Sangharsh		Odia Film
1990	Ghar Ho To Aisa	Sharda V. Kumar	
1991	Mane	Geeta	Kannada film
1991	Ek Ghar	Geeta	Hindi version of Mane
1991	Saudagar	Aarti	
1992	Current	Sita	
1992	Yalgaar	Sunita (Deepak's wife)	
1994	Mr. Azaad	Rajlaxmi (Azaad's mother)	
1995	Dushmani: A Violent Love Story	Rama Oberoi	
1995	Jai Vikraanta	Harnam's Wife	
1995	Guddu	Kavita Bahadur	
1996	Sautela Bhai	Saraswati	Delayed release
1999	Kabhi Pass Kabhi Fail		
2000	Bawandar	Shobha Devi	
2002	Leela	Chaitali	Winner – Best Supporting Actress Award at the 2003 Karachi Film Festival
2002	Shakti: The Power	Shekhar's mother	
2003	Freaky Chakra	Ms. Thomas	English film
2004	Anahat	Mahattarika	Marathi film
2006	Yatra	Smita D. Joglekar/Sharda	
2008	Firaaq	Arati	
2011	Tell Me O Kkhuda	Mrs. R. Kapoor	
2010	Memories in March	Arati S. Mishra	Winner – Best Actress Award at the 2012 ImagineIndia Film Festival (Spain)
2011	Trapped in Tradition: Rivaaz	Paro	
2011	Zindagi Na Milegi Dobara	Rahila Qureshi	
2011	Bhindi Baazaar Inc.	Bano	
2013	Mahabharat	Kunti	voice role
2013	B.A. Pass	Mrs. Suhasini	Special appearance
2013	Aurangzeb	Mrs. Ravikant Phogat	
2013	Inkaar	Mrs. Kamdhar	Nominated – Apsara Award for Best Actress in a Supporting Role
2013	Listen... Amaya	Leela	Winner – Best Actress Award at the 2013 New York Indian Film Festival
2014	Yaariyan	Girls hostel warden	
2014	19th January	Naseema	
2014	Bang Bang!	Jai and Viren's mother (Shikka Nanda)	
2015	NH10	Ammaji	
2015	Heartless	Mother of the protagonist	
2015	Tevar	Pintoo's mother	
2016	Lion	Saroj Sood	
2023	Mother Teresa & Me	Mother Superior	
2023	Goldfish	Sadhana Tripathi	
2025	Raat Akeli Hai: The Bansal Murders	Geeta Vohra aka Guru Ma	

=== Television ===
Year	Show	Role	Notes
1985	Apna Jahan	Shanti A. Sahani	Television film
1991–1992	Kahkashan		
1992	Sauda		
1994	Tanaav	Mrs Malik	
1995	Thoda sa Aasman		
2003–2004	Muqammal	Sumeesha	
2011	Mukti Bandhan	Parimeeta	
2016	Meri Awaaz Hi Pehchaan Hai	Kalyani Gaikwad	
2017	The Boy with the Topknot	Sathnam's Mother	Television film
2019	Made in Heaven	Gayatri Mathur	Guest
2020	Pawan & Pooja	Pooja Kalra	
2020	Criminal Justice: Behind Closed Doors	Vijaya 'Vijji' Chandra	
