= Marc Zuber =

Indian-British actor (1944–2003)

- Zuber in Cricketer (1985)
- Born: Zubair Ahmed Siddiqi; 5 May 1944; Lucknow, United Provinces, British India
- Died: 28 May 2003 (aged 59); London, England
- Occupation: Actor
- Years active: 1968–2003

Zubair Ahmed Siddiqi (5 May 1944 – 28 May 2003), better known as Marc Zuber, was an Indian–British actor, who appeared in many British and Hindi films and television dramas.

== Life and career ==
Zubair Ahmed Siddiqi was born in Lucknow, India on 5 May 1944. He moved to Britain with his family in 1951, joining his father who had become a BBC radio producer there, two years earlier. Zuber grew up in London and went to Harrow Technical College, before training as an actor at the Webber Douglas Academy of Dramatic Art.

He left drama school in 1968 and changed his name to Marc Zuber, on the advice of his agent and began his acting career in theatre with seasons in Chester, Bolton, Richmond, the Shaw Theatre, London and for two years at the Royal Shakespeare Company. He mostly appeared in small roles in film and television, including Coronation Street in 1990, in which he played Mr. Khan, but he also starred in Hindi films like Yeh Nazdeekiyan (1982), Kamla (1984) and Qatl (1986), in which he played a leading role.

His film appearances include: The Satanic Rites of Dracula, The Wind and the Lion, The Sea Wolves, Shirley Valentine and Robin Hood: Prince of Thieves, while his television credits include: The Onedin Line, Doomwatch, The Regiment, The Changes, Space: 1999, Quiller, Blake's 7, The Sweeney, Minder, Buccaneer, The Enigma Files, The Chinese Detective, The Bill, Holby City and King & Castle.

He also worked with actor Aditya Pancholi and actress Persis Khambatta, in the TV film Shingora in 1986.

Zuber died from a heart attack in London, on 28 May 2003, at the age of 59.

== Filmography ==
- (1971) A Kiss is Just a Kiss as Radio Operator (Television Debut)
- (1971) Insaaf as Munna (Debut film)
- (1971) The Onedin Line - 1 Episode as Peasant
- (1972) The Fenn Street Gang - 1 Episode as Lorenzo
- (1972) Jason King - 1 Episode as Policeman
- (1972) ITV Sunday Night Theatre - 1 Episode as Student #2
- (1972) Doomwatch - 1 Episode as Reporter
- (1972) The Adventurer - 1 Episode as Kanarek
- (1973) The Protectors - 1 Episode as Kahan's Henchman
- (1973) A Little Princess - 3 Episodes as Ram Dass
- (1973) The Regiment - 1 Episode as Chandra
- (1973) Penny Gold as Hotel Receptionist
- (1973) Orson Welles's Great Mysteries - 1 Episode as Don Feredia
- (1973) The Satanic Rites of Dracula as Guard 1
- (1974) Justice - 1 Episode as Matthew Patel
- (1974) A Private Enterprise as Ashok
- (1974) Softly Softly: Task Force - 1 Episode as Masrur Jemal
- (1974) Thursday Play Date - 1 Episode as Mr. Singh
- (1975) The Changes - 4 Episodes as Kemal
- (1975) The Wind and the Lion as The Sultan
- (1975) Whodunnit? - 1 Episode as Robin Crouch
- (1975) Quiller - 1 Episode as Colonel Zadok
- (1975) State Of Emergency - 3 Episodes as A.J. Sharma
- (1975–1977) Space: 1999 - 2 Episodes as Security Lieutenant, Main Mission Operative
- (1976) Hadleigh - 1 Episode as Nadir
- (1976) Black and White in Color as Le Major Anglais
- (1976) The Expert - 1 Episode as Mark Bowden
- (1976) Crown Court - 3 Episodes as Manzil Ali
- (1976–1979) Angels - 6 Episodes as Dr. Choudry
- (1978) Play for Today - 1 Episode as Prakash Patel
- (1978) Emmerdale - 1 Episode as Dr. Patel
- (1978) Premiere - 1 Episode as Indian Doctor
- (1978) The Sweeney - 1 Episode as Abdul
- (1978) Sweeney 2 as Andy
- (1978) Blake's 7 - Series 1, Episode 11: Bounty as Tarvin
- (1978) Accident - 4 Episodes as Dr. Asif
- (1979) Minder - Series 1, Episode 6: Aces High...And Sometimes Very Low as Nick
- (1980) Armchair Thriller - 1 Episode as Doctor
- (1980) Buccaneer - 2 Episodes as Nasir
- (1980) The Enigma Flies - 1 Episode as Steve Michelaides
- (1980) Escape - 1 Episode as Captain Akache Mahmud
- (1980) The Sea Wolves as Ram Das Gupta
- (1980) The Merchant of Venice as Prince of Morocco
- (1981) The Chinese Detective - 1 Episode as Sheik Ahmed Mahmoud
- (1982) Journey Through the Black Sun as Main Mission Operative
- (1982) Ek Aur Aasman (Shelved film)
- (1982) Untitled film (Shelved film)
- (1982) Yeh Nazdeekiyan as Sunil Verma
- (1983) Bloomfield - 3 Episodes as Bloomfield
- (1984) The Miracle Worker (Shelved film)
- (1984) Milenge Kabhi (Unreleased film)
- (1984) Inteha as Anil Mehra
- (1984) Ram Tera Desh as Sub-Inspector Kumar
- (1984) Daraar (Shelved film)
- (1984) Bhavna as Ajay Kapoor
- (1984) Aaghat (Shelved film)
- (1984) Kanoon Meri Mutthi Mein as Gautam
- (1984) Kamla as Jaisingh Jadhav
- (1984) Kashmakash (Shelved film)
- (1985) Vaishnav (Shelved film)
- (1985) Cricketer as Jay
- (1985) Telephone as Dinesh
- (1985) Yaar Kasam
- (1985) Tucker's Luck - 4 Episodes as Mr. Choudhury
- (1985) Haveli as Inspector Shyam / Pritam
- (1985) Aurat Pair Ki Juti Nahin Hai as Lawyer
- (1986) Qatl as Ranjeet
- (1986) Foreign Body as Macho Escort
- (1986) Aashiana
- (1986) Shingora as Mr. Vikram Lamba
- (1986) Pratima (Shelved film)
- (1986) Kaanch Ke Phool (Shelved film)
- (1986–1990) Lafanga (Aap Ke Karib) (Shelved film)
- (1986) Katha Sagar - 1 Episode
- (1987–1988) Adha Sach Adha Jhoot
- (1987) Aaghat (Unreleased film)
- (1987) Dak Bangla as Ajay
- (1987) Aaj as Arun Bakshi
- (1987) Pehlu (Unreleased film)
- (1988) Rukhsat as Gautam Saigal
- (1988) Deadline as Suleiman
- (1988) Ek Naya Rishta as Professor Shekhar Verma (Guest appearance)
- (1988) Bela (Shelved film)
- (1988) Hatyakaand (Shelved film)
- (1988) Gruey - 6 Episodes as Mr. Rahim
- (1988) King & Castle - 1 Episode as Ricky Mintoff
- (1989) Doorie as Vijay Saxena
- (1989) Main Tere Liye as Marc
- (1989) Sachche Ka Bol-Bala as Police Commissioner Pandey (Special appearance)
- (1989) Hannay - 1 Episode as Auguste Kars
- (1989) Shirley Valentine as Renos
- (1989) Saracen - 1 Episode as Tarik Fathy
- (1989) Jism Ka Rishta
- (1990) Pyar Ke Naam Qurbaan as Gautam
- (1990) Stolen - 2 Episodes as Mr. Hussein
- (1990) Navy SEALs as Villa Hostage
- (1990) Coronation Street - 3 Episodes as Mr. Khan
- (1990) Rear Window - 1 Episode as Sir Umar Hyat Khan
- (1990) The South Bank Show - 1 Episode as Cultmaster
- (1991) Robin Hood: Prince of Thieves as Interrogator
- (1991) Family Pride - 1 Episode as Shahid Rizvi
- (1991) Khooni Raat as Court Witness (Cameo appearance)
- (1992) Jawaan (Shelved film)
- (1993) The Darlings Buds of May - 1 Episode as Mr. Sikkim
- (1979–1994) Minder as Mr. Hussein / Nick
- (1994–1999) The Bill - 4 Episodes as Atul Roy / Yusuf Ali
- (1994) Wild Justice as Customs Official
- (1994) Stages - 1 Episode as Uncle
- (1995) Sandhya Chhaya as Elder Son
- (1995) Divine Lovers as Prince Kabir
- (1998) Animated World Faiths - 1 Episode as Kamsa
- (1998) Jinnah as Muhammad Iqbal
- (2000) Holby City - 1 Episode as Vikrant Shukula
- (2001) Skin Deep as Father (Last film)
- (2002) Murder - 4 Episodes as Sharad
- (2003) Grease Monkeys - 10 Episodes as Mo Dhillon (Last Television appearance)
