= Helena Luke =

Indian actress (died 2024)

- Born: 1958
- Died: 3 November 2024 (aged 65–66)

Helena Luke (1958 – 3 November 2024) was an Indian actress who worked predominantly in Hindi cinema.

== Career ==
She became famous for playing the role of Lady Helena in Amitabh Bachchan's film Mard (1985) directed by Manmohan Desai. She was briefly married to Mithun Chakraborty.

Helena lived in the United States for many years, where she worked for Delta Air Lines.

Luke died in the United States on 3 November 2024.

== Selected filmography ==
- Judaai (1980) as Madhavika
- Yeh Nazdeekiyan (1982) as Actress (uncredited)
- Saath Saath (1982)
- Bhai Aakhir Bhai Hota Hai (1982)
- Do Gulaab (1983)
- Aao Pyaar Karen (1983)
- Mere Saath Chal (1984) as Seema
- Mard (1985) as Lady Helena (uncredited)
- Ek Naya Rishta (1988) as Ruby
