= Sins (film) =

- Directed by: Vinod Pande
- Written by: Vinod Pande
- Produced by: Vinod Pande
- Starring: Shiney Ahuja; Seema Rehmani
- Cinematography: Joginder Panda
- Edited by: Vinod Pande
- Music by: Sanjoy Chowdhury
- Distributed by: Rainspirit Films
- Release date: 25 February 2005 (India)
- Running time: 134 minutes
- Country: India
- Language: English

Sins is a 2005 Indian English-language drama film directed and produced by Vinod Pande. It stars Shiney Ahuja and Seema Rahmani. The film is based on a news story that Pande read in 1988 about a Kerala priest sentenced to death on sexual harassment and murder charges. The film depicts the unconventional passionate affair of a young girl with an older priest. Deciding to keep their love story confidential, things take such a twist that their love story takes a perpetual transformation into a story marked by jealousy, hatred, and treachery.

The film has a few controversial topless scenes, as a result of which it received an A certificate from the censor board of India. The film depicting a Catholic priest romantically involved with a young woman, was protested against by those that felt it was a negative portrayal of Catholicism and indecent. Catholic Secular Forum filed a public interest litigation to stall its release but court cleared the film. Released on 25 February 2005, the film was commercially unsuccessful.

The film is based on a news story that Pande read in 1988 about a priest sentenced to death on sexual harassment and murder charges.

== Cast ==
- Shiney Ahuja as Father William
- Seema Rahmani as Rose-Marie Fernandez
- Nitesh Pandey as Graham
- Uttara Baokar as Mrs Fernandes
- Shashank Shekhar Mahakul as Joe, Rosie's brother
- Rishi Khurana as Joseph
- Dadhi Pande as John
- Vivek Mishra as Dean
- Madhavi Chopra as Rajni
- Mohit Nilekani as Kailash
- Shanu Dev as Police Inspector
- Vivek Rawat as Ismail
- Gauri Shankar as Ray
- Navin Kumar as Sam
- Manoj Bhaskar as Bhaskar
- Aditi Sengupta as Shashi
- Ashutosh Pathak as Postman
- Ray Mathew as auto driver
- Krishna Upadhyay as vegetable vendor
- Rajat Nath as Bishop
- Bikramjeet as Bishop's assistant
- Kamal Adib as Judge
- Sunil Kumar as William's servant
- Rajesh Mishra as Julian

== See also ==
- The Crime of Padre Amaro, a controversial Mexican-Spanish film with a similar theme.
