= Yeh Nazdeekiyan =

- Film poster
- Directed by: Vinod Pande
- Starring: Marc Zuber, Shabana Azmi, Parveen Babi, Mala Jaggi, Bharati Achrekar, Neena Gupta, Sudhir Pandey & Vinod Pande
- Cinematography: Nadeem Khan
- Music by: Raghunath Seth
- Release date: 1982
- Country: India
- Language: Hindi

Yeh Nazdeekiyan is a 1982 Bollywood movie.

The film exploring extra-marital relationship was directed by Vinod Pande. The film got an 'A' (for adults only) certificate by the Central Board of Film Certification in India. The film starred Marc Zuber, Shabana Azmi and Parveen Babi besides Mala Jaggi, Bharati Achrekar, Neena Gupta, Sudhir Pandey and Vinod Pande himself.

== Plot ==
Sunil Verma, head of an advertising agency, his wife Shobna and their daughter, studying in a boarding school, lead a happy, upper middle-class life. Though Shobhna is aware of her husband's flirty behavior, she is not worried about it because she feels their bond is strong enough and they belong to each other. Sunil meets Kiran for the first time, during an audition for models for his new advertisement campaign. Despite Kiran being too attractive, Sunil dismisses a chance of being intimate with her stating he finds model one-dimensional, they have only beauty. Kiran also hears this from her fellow models that, Sunil doesn't care for models. Fellow models challenge Kiran to try to seduce Sunil and she tries to do that. However Sunil ignores Kiran.

However, during the outdoor shooting session for a commercial, Sunil falls for the charms of a beautiful model, Kiran. Kiran confronts Sunil for ignoring her and they end up having sex.The extramarital affair disrupts the family life of Sunil and Shobna. In an attempt to revive her marriage Shobhna takes a holiday when Kiran barges in to disrupt things. Sunil confesses to her affair and Shobhna walks out of the home. She successfully revives her career as a radio singer, while Kiran moves in to take her place. But soon Sunil begins to miss and long for his estranged wife. Now Kiran decides to move out bringing the family together once again.

== Cast ==
- Marc Zuber as Sunil Verma
- Shabana Azmi as Shobhna
- Parveen Babi as Kiran
- Mala Jaggi as Julie
- Bharati Achrekar as Neelu (Rajesh's wife)
- Neena Gupta as Neena
- Col Raj Kumar Kapoor as Deepak Kapoor
- Sudhir Pandey as Rajesh
- Raj Kumar Kapoor
- Vinod Pande as Manoj Nath
- Helena Luke

== Music ==
All lyrics were written by Vinod Pande

1. "Kitni Haseen Hai Ye Nashili" - Asha Bhosle
2. "Aavaaragi Hamaari Pyaari Si" - Talat Aziz
3. "Dil Dil Dil" - Asha Bhosle
4. "Maine Ik Git Likha Hai" - Anuradha Paudwal
5. "Do Ghadi Behla Gayi Parchaiya" - Bhupinder Singh
6. "Ek Daur Vo Bhi Tha" - Anuradha Paudwal

Anuradha Paudwal was nominated for Filmfare Award for Best Female Playback Singer for the song Maine Ik Geet Likha Hai.

== Reception ==
Reviewing it for India Today, Aroon Purie called the film a "cliche trapped within a cliché" with a hackneyed theme. He went on to term the film a "cheap imitation of an 'art' film which is as subtle as a sledge-hammer with the emotional depth of a soft drink commercial."
