= Ek Baar Phir =

- DVD cover
- Directed by: Vinod Pande
- Story by: Vinod Pande
- Produced by: Vinod Pande
- Starring: Suresh Oberoi, Deepti Naval, Saeed Jaffrey, Chitto Chopra, Pradeep Verma, Vinod Pande
- Cinematography: Nadeem Khan
- Edited by: Kant Pan, Pradeep Roy
- Music by: Raghunath Seth; Vinod Pande (lyrics)
- Distributed by: Image Enterprises
- Release dates: 28 July 1979 (UK); 7 March 1980 (India)
- Running time: 147 min
- Country: India
- Language: Hindi

Ek Baar Phir (Hindi: एक बार फिर; translation: Once Again) is a 1979 film produced and directed by Vinod Pande. This offbeat social drama casts Suresh Oberoi and Deepti Naval as lead pair with Saeed Jaffrey, Chitto Chopra, Pradeep Verma, Vinod Pande in support cast. It was the first Indian-language film to be made in England.

The story is about the incompatibility between a film star husband and a traditional wife resulting in an extra-marital relationship.

== Critical reception ==
The film was later featured in Avijit Ghosh's book, 40 Retakes: Bollywood Classics You May have Missed. Ek Baar Phir was described as "a bold movie that refreshingly speaks out for women's freedom of choice in a failed marriage at a time when Bollywood was still making Maang Bharo Sajna."

== Plot ==
Kalpana (Deepti Naval), a middle class girl, is excited about her marriage with a film star Mahendar Kumar (Suresh Oberoi). The star is busy with his profession and is a flirt. Kalpana learns this after marriage and finds Mahendar has no time to spend with her. Both happen to visit London on Mahendar's project. There she meets a young student Vimal (Pradeep Verma), studying arts at London University, who makes art works of the people around and exhibits them. He requests Kalpana for a sketch, which she obliges. They meet very often and fall in love with each other. With him, Kalpana sees the new phase and joy of life, which she has not seen earlier. They get intimate and Kalpana fells guilty about this. She stops meeting Vimal for some time. One day she finds a letter from Vimal and replies him. She starts meeting him again and finds herself swaying between Mahendar and Vimal. At this juncture, she decides to break away from Mahendar and joins Vimal to lead a joyful life. The rest story shows the turn of events thereafter, in the lives of Mahendar, Kalpana and Vimal.

== Cast ==
- Suresh Oberoi as Mahender Kumar
- Deepti Naval as Kalpana Kumar
- Saeed Jaffrey as Saeed
- Pradeep Verma
- Avtar Singh
- Chitto Chopra
- Collin Alexander
- Dilip
- Kalpana Pandya
- Kinsan
- Krishan Gould
- Leena Patel
- Mansur
- Maria
- Meenu Budhwar
- Mohammed
- Paravati Meharaj
- Prem Prakash
- Salim Shaikh
- Vinod Gurani
- Vinod Pande
- Wasim Siddiqui
- Yolande
- Zubair Zalaria

== Release ==
The film had its gala opening at the Liberty West End cinema on Edgware Road in London on 28 July 1979.

== Soundtrack ==
All lyrics are written by Vinod Pande; all music is composed by Raghunath Seth.

| No. | Title | Singer(s) | Length |
|---|---|---|---|
| 1. | "Baby I Have A Crush On You" | Kittu | 4:35 |
| 2. | "Bambai Se Aaya Hoon" | Suresh Wadkar | 5:45 |
| 3. | "Jeevan Ek Sauda Hai" | Anuradha Paudwal | 6:35 |
| 4. | "Jane Yeh Mujhko Kya Ho Raha Hai" | Bhupinder | 7:35 |
| 5. | "Yeh Paude Yeh Patte Yeh Phool" | Anuradha Paudwal, Bhupinder | 4:55 |
| 6. | "Orchestral Music" (Ek Baar Phir) | | 4:40 |
