= Ek Naya Rishta =

- Poster
- Directed by: Vinod Pande
- Screenplay by: Vinod Pande; J. P. Dixit
- Story by: Vinod Pande
- Produced by: Vinod Pande
- Starring: Rekha; Raj Kiran
- Cinematography: Nadeem Khan
- Edited by: Om Prakash Makkar
- Music by: Khayyam
- Release date: 17 June 1988
- Country: India
- Language: Hindi

Ek Naya Rishta (lit. 'A new relation') is a 1988 Indian drama film. The film was produced and directed by Vinod Pande, starring Rekha, Raj Kiran, Mazhar Khan and Om Shivpuri among others. The film is a modern take on relationships, business, independence, interdependence and the institution of marriage and hints at indirect surrogacy. It was perhaps the first movie of its time to talk about surrogacy. It also highlighted how society forces the helpless to fall prey to the murky business of prostitution.

== Plot ==
Womanizer and alcoholic Rajiv Tandon lives a wealthy lifestyle with his widowed industrialist dad, Shankardayal in a palatial house. Rajiv is not interested in marriage, or in any permanent relationship with any woman. His dad dies, he wills that all his wealth and money will only be inherited by Rajiv after he gets a son within 18 months of his death. Thus follows a series of incidents, where he starts searching for a suitable woman who would give birth to his child sans any demand of marriage. He readily offers a huge sum and a luxurious lifestyle to a woman whose willing to give birth without becoming his permanent responsibility.

== Production ==
Filming started around 1983 continued until 1985, but production later stalled as Pande ran into problems with producers not willing to finance it. In March 1986, The Illustrated Weekly of India reported that the film was ready for release. Rekha was Pande's first choice. The film was shot in Alibag.

== Cast ==
- Rekha as Aarti
- Raj Kiran as Rajiv Dayal Tandon
- Mazhar Khan as Sanjay Kumar
- Om Shivpuri as Shankar Dayal Tandon
- Helena Luke as Ruby
- Vinod Pande as Rajan
- Rabia Amin as Rosy
- Surendra Pal as Vikram
- Nitin Sethi as
- Urmila Bhatt as Aarti's mother
- Anjan Srivastav as Rajiv's relative
- Moolchand as Rajiv's relative
- C.S. Dubey as Rajiv's relative
- Yunus Parvez as Aarti's customer
- Satish Kaushik as
- Manmouji as
- Marc Zuber as Professor Shekhar Verma (Guest appearance)

== Music ==
The lyrics for the film songs were by Nida Fazli & Naqsh Lyallpuri. Jagjit Kaur was the Asscociate Music Director.

Song	Singer
"Ehsaas Ka Sauda Hai"	Rekha
"Kiran Kiran Mein"	Lata Mangeshkar
"Jise Samjhe The Hum Afsana Kal Tak"	Lata Mangeshkar, Bhupinder Singh
"Zindagi Hai"	Bhupinder Singh
"Mera Mehboob"	Asha Bhosle

== Reception ==
Democratic World magazine wrote that the film is "written from the woman's point of view". The 1991 film directory Collections edited by Ratan Sharda gave the film a rating of 3 stars.
