= Mere Saath Chal =

- Directed by: Suresh Kumar Sharma
- Release date: 1986
- Country: India
- Language: Hindi

Mere Saath Chal is a 1986 Hindi-language Bollywood drama film directed by Suresh Kumar Sharma.

== Plot ==
Geeta (Smita Patil) has been institutionalized as she had suffered mental trauma in her childhood. She is unable to recall the incidents surrounding the trauma, and is unable to get appropriate treatment. Amit (Farooq Shaikh) meets with Geeta, and falls in love with her. She is able to relate to Amit, and the doctors observe some progress in her treatment. Amit and Geeta both fall in love with each other. However, Amit is to marry Neena (Prema Narayan), and Amit's elder brother, Ravi (Shreeram Lagoo) will not permit him to marry a girl with a mental condition. There are only two options left for Amit – run away from home and marry Geeta; or leave Geeta to an uncertain fate, and marry Neena.

== Cast ==
- Shreeram Lagoo as Ravi
- Prema Narayan as Neena
- Smita Patil as Geeta
- Farooq Shaikh as Amit
- Helena Luke as Seema
