= Mard (1985 film) =

1985 Hindi action film directed by Manmohan Desai

- Mard film poster
- Directed by: Manmohan Desai
- Written by: Story: Prayag Raj; Additional Story: Pushpa Raj Anand; Dialogues: Inder Raj Anand; Additional Dialogues: Anil Nagrath; Sohel Don
- Screenplay by: K. K. Shukla
- Produced by: Manmohan Desai; Anil Nagrath (co-producer); Pammy Varma (co-producer)
- Starring: Amitabh Bachchan; Amrita Singh; Nirupa Roy; Dara Singh; Prem Chopra; Dan Dhanoa
- Cinematography: Peter Pereira
- Edited by: Raju Kapadia; Mangal Mistry
- Music by: Anu Malik
- Release date: 8 November 1985
- Running time: 175 minutes
- Country: India
- Language: Hindi
- Budget: ₹28 million
- Box office: ₹162 million

Mard (transl. 'Man') is a 1985 Indian Hindi-language action film, directed by Manmohan Desai and starring Amitabh Bachchan, Amrita Singh and Dara Singh. The movie was based on American comic character Phantom or Indian interpretation Betaal. Amitabh Bachchan was nominated for Filmfare Award for Best Actor category. Mard was the second highest-grossing film of the year. and the eighth highest-grossing film of the 1980s (1980 to 1989). Furthermore, when adjusted for inflation, Mard is one of the highest-grossing films released during the Diwali festival, approximately more than 450cr nett. in today's time.

== Plot ==
The film opens in early 20th century India, still under British rule. Raja Azad Singh thwarts British soldiers from plundering an Indian fort, recovering the stolen jewels. His wife, Rani Durga, gives birth to a son, Raju, and Raja marks him with the word "mard" (man), symbolizing strength and bravery. Lady Helena, a sympathetic Englishwoman, uncovers the soldiers' atrocities, leading to their reprimand.

English officers General Dyer and Inspector Simon, along with local doctor Harry, conspire to capture Raja. Harry sedates Raja, leading to his capture and imprisonment. Rani Durga escapes but is shot, and their horse brings baby Raju to an orphanage. A blacksmith's wife adopts Raju, and Rani Durga loses her speech and becomes a washerwoman. Harry is appointed mayor for his betrayal.

Raju grows up strong, working as a tanga driver. He confronts Ruby, Harry’s daughter, over her reckless behavior, leading to her falling in love with him. Harry and General Dyer demolish a slum, but Raju rallies the residents to resist. Lady Helena intervenes, stopping the demolition and releasing Raju from arrest. Harry’s attempts to bribe and eliminate Raju fail.

Danny, General Dyer’s son, runs nefarious operations, including blood camps, slave labor, and the imprisonment of Raja Azad Singh. Raju learns of his lineage and plans to rescue his father. Danny captures and kills Raju’s adoptive parents, prompting Raju to attack the camp. Danny traps Raju and stages a gladiatorial fight between Raju and his father. They recognize each other during the fight and turn against their captors.

In the final battle, Raju and Raja defeat the villains, rescue Lady Helena and Rani Durga, and ensure the downfall of Harry, Danny, and their cohorts. The film ends with Raju and Ruby reuniting with Raju’s parents, symbolizing the dawn of India’s independence movement.

== Cast ==
- Amitabh Bachchan as Raju Singh / Mard Tangewala
- Amrita Singh as Ruby
- Dara Singh as Raja Azaad Singh
- Nirupa Roy as Rani Durga
- Prem Chopra as Dr. Harry
- Dan Dhanoa as Danny Dyer
- Kamal Kapoor as General Dyer
- Bob Christo as Inspector Simon
- Satyendra Kapoor as Blacksmith (Jamuna's Husband)
- Manik Irani as Zbyszko (as Manek Irani)
- Seema Deo as Jamuna
- Joginder, Joginder Shelly as Street Dancer 'Jako Rakhe Saiyan'
- Kirti Kumar as Shamsher (Guest Appearance)
- C.S. Dubey as Lalaji (Father of Groom) (uncredited)
- Helena Luke as Lady Helena (uncredited)
- Shivraj as Priest (uncredited)
- Moti as Dog

== Location ==
Mard was mostly shot in Ooty (near a golf links site belonging to Hindustan Photo Films) and at various locations in Karnataka, such as the Lalitha Mahal in Mysore and the Bangalore Palace.

== Soundtrack ==
Mard

Soundtrack album by Anu Malik
- Released: 7 June 1985
- Genre: Film soundtrack
- Length: 36:58
- Label: T-Series

Anu Malik chronology
Phaansi Ke Baad (1985)	Mard (1985)	Jaan Ki Baazi (1985)

Anu Malik composed music for Mard. The Soundtrack album consisting of 6 tracks was released on 7 June 1985 on T-Series. Critics accused Desai of using double-meaning words in the song Hum to tamboo mein bamboo lagaye baithe. However, the song was a hit. This is one of the films where Kishore Kumar did not sing for Amitabh Bachchan, as well as Coolie and Naseeb, due to Bachchan refusing to appear as a guest in a film which Kishore produced.

All lyrics are written by Prayag Raj (except where noted); all music is composed by Anu Malik.

No.	Title	Singer(s)	Length
1.	"Hum To Tambu Mein Bambu"	Asha Bhosle, Mohammed Aziz	5:52
2.	"Will You Marry Me"	Asha Bhosle, Anu Malik	4:25
3.	"Buri Nazarwaale"	Shabbir Kumar	6:26
4.	"Mard Tangewala"	Mohammed Aziz	5:02
5.	"Sun Rubia Tumse Pyar Ho Gaya"	Shabbir Kumar, S. Janaki, Sharon Prabhakar, Amitabh Bachchan, Anu Malik	6:25
6.	"Maa Sherawaali" (Lyrics by Indeevar)	Shabbir Kumar	8:48
Total length:			36:58

== Box office ==
The film opened to nearly sold-out theatres and grossed approximately ₹16cr.
