= Kamla (film) =

- Directed by: Jagmohan Mundhra
- Written by: Vijay Tendulkar; Vasant Dev (dialogue)
- Screenplay by: Vijay Tendulkar
- Story by: Vijay Tendulkar
- Based on: Kamala by Vijay Tendulkar
- Produced by: Jagmohan Mundhra
- Starring: Shabana Azmi; Deepti Naval; Marc Zuber; A.K. Hangal; Tun Tun; Sulabha Deshpande
- Cinematography: Pravin Bhatt
- Edited by: Ashok Bandekar
- Music by: Bappi Lahiri
- Release date: 1985
- Country: India
- Language: Hindi

Kamla is a 1984 Hindi film produced and directed by Jagmohan Mundhra, starring Deepti Naval in the title role, Shabana Azmi, and Marc Zuber in lead roles. The screenplay by Vijay Tendulkar was based on his play Kamala, written in 1981.

== Plot ==
Jaisingh Jadav (Marc Zuber), a Delhi-based journalist finds that even to this date, the flesh trade exists in a village in Madhya Pradesh, the victims being girls belonging to the Bhil tribe. Like any avid journalist, he travels to the village, followed by really buying a girl named Kamla (Deepti Naval) and takes her to his home in Delhi. As his intentions are good, some days later he holds a press conference where he reveals the actual wrongdoings going on in the village.

== Cast ==
- Deepti Naval as Kamla
- Shabana Azmi as Sarita Jadhav
- Marc Zuber as Jaisingh Jadhav
- A.K. Hangal as Kakasaab (Sarita's uncle)
- Sulabha Deshpande
- Tun Tun

== Music ==
1. "Aaj Phir Aaine Se" - Salma Agha
2. "Insaano Ko Neelam Kare Duniya" - Pankaj Udhas
3. "Kaisa Yeh Karam" - Pankaj Udhas

== Critical reception ==
Upon its release, Kamla received rave reviews. The Times of India in a review stated, "Deepti Naval is called to widen her eyes, tremble like a scared rabbit and drop pearly smiles. To her credit, she performs these chores competently." The Indian Express wrote, "Mundhara is to be complimented on getting two credible – perhaps notable – performances from Deepti Naval and Marc Zuber – whose talents have so far been pretty well concealed."

== Real life Incident Inspiration ==
The movie is based on Tendulkar's play, which in turn is inspired by a real life expose by the journalist Ashwini Sarin, of The Indian Express. In the expose he actually bought a girl from the rural flesh market, from a village of Dholpur, Rajasthan, for an amount of Rs. 20,000. He then presented the woman at a press conference.
