= Aurat (word) =

Arabic word

Aurat is a word which means "woman" in many Asian languages including Urdu, and Sorani Kurdish. It occurs in Azerbaijani as "arvad" and Ottoman Turkish as "avret".

== Etymology and socio-cultural construct ==
The word "aurat" originally comes from the Arabic word "awrah". In Arabic, the words awrah or awrat means "defectiveness", "imperfection", "blemish," or "weakness". The most common English translation of awrah is "nakedness". In Arabic, the word 'awrah is used in reference to both men and women, referring to the parts of the body that need to be covered to maintain modesty. According to Nurhan GÜNER avrat/avret in Turkish is borrowed from Arabic and is not related to Old Turkic uragut. The word is used in the Quran to denote "privacy", "vulnerability" and "nakedness" as well. Aharôn Layiš' book on family laws among Druze attributes a quote to al-Tanukhi that says "..Women are all nakedness (awrat) and all nakedness should be covered" Moshe Piamenta, in his book "Islam in Everyday Arabic Speech", notes that in the language of the Bedouin, synecdochic usage of word 'awrat' denotes 'woman'. In the Kurdish language, the word 'Aurat' for women is spelled as 'avarat' where as in (Ottoman) Turkish it is spelled as 'Avret'.

Before entering South Asia, it was used in the Persian language in Iran to mean 'woman'. In Mohammad Moin's Persian dictionary, awrah has two different meanings: "nakedness" and "young woman". But subsequently, Iranians started avoiding the word "aurat" for 'women', due to its meaning of "nakedness". In (Ottoman) Turkish, the word 'avret' was used more for common married or adult women, whereas the word "hatun" was used for more respected women. In Ottoman times any unmarried adolescent girl was called "kiz" and her silence was assumed as consent for marriage purposes. Kiz were freer and less controlled, but once married and considered avret their mobility and sexuality came under drastic social control, so that they would not engage in adultery, in order to preserve male right of lineage and patriarchal honor. According to Heidi Stein avrat / avret meaning woman (Arab.“‘aurat, privy parts”) is among 78 early (9th to 11th centuries) Arabic cultural words that found their way into everyday Turkish language during the first Arabic linguistic import stage through Persian language. In Turkish since the twentieth century, use of word avret has been limited to intimate body parts. According to Pashayeva Gunel Bakhsheyish kizi and Musayeva Ilaha Ilham kizi (2019) The word ovrat in Arabic means a married woman, who has a husband; wife– avrat in Turkish language, avrad in Gagauz language, arvad in Azerbaijani. Kizi (2019) says sufix "عار" [ʻār] {noun} meaning shame (also: disgrace, dishonor, dishonour) too might have come from Arabic. The alternate etymological origin for 'arvad' may be arva (tare) meaning tearing of daughter's relationship from parents while getting married and its root may be from Mongolian language lexemes abra-arba-arva the root ab-av means magic, conjuring in Mongolian language.

=== Etymology ===
The word Erva (ערוה) first appears in the Hebrew Bible in Genesis 9:22, in the story of the Curse of Canaan. The word frequently occurs in the Hebrew Bible as the inflected form Ervat (ערות). The word also appears in Leviticus 18:6. The verse reads as follows, with the word erva being translated to nakedness.

None of you shall approach to any that is near of kin to him, to uncover their nakedness. I am the LORD.

The term has since been used in the Talmud as both a blanket term for all prohibited sexual acts (עריות) and to describe parts of a female considered to be immodest and sexually provocative, including a woman's hair, thighs, and singing voice. The term continues to be used in many other sources of Jewish law and is still used in modern Hebrew today to mean either prohibited sexual acts or sexual organs.

In Arabic, the term 'awrah or 'awrat (عورة) derives from the root ‘a-w-r which means "defectiveness", "imperfection", "blemish" or "weakness". However, the most common English translation is "nakedness".

In Persian and Kurdish as well as Urdu, the word 'awrat (Persian: عورت) derived from the Arabic 'awrah, has been used widely to mean "woman". Consulting Mohammad Moin's dictionary of Persian, 'awrah has two meanings:

1. Nakedness
2. Young woman

The meaning in other derivatives ranges from "blind in one eye" to "false or artificial", among others. Traditionally, the word 'awrat, alongside the word za'ifeh (which derives from Arabic ḍa'īf (ضعيف), meaning weak), has been associated with femininity and women who live under the protection of a man. In modern-day Iran, using 'awrah or za'ifah to refer to women is uncommon and is considered sexist language. Instead, the word "zan" is used. In Tajikistan and Uzbekistan, the word za'if is still used in Tajik and its subdialects.

In Turkish, avrat is an often derogatory term for 'woman' or 'wife'.

== Spelling and pronunciation variations ==
Languages	English spelling	Meaning (Fill applicable out of: 'awrah (intimate parts)/ Woman/ Wife)	In native script	Communities, regions and countries of usage	Additional note(s)
Arabic	awrat, awrath, avrat	'awrah	عورة	Arab World	
Early New Persian * Beginning 8th century AD					
Classical Persian: Beginning 10th century AD					
Dari language					
Persian	Aurat, Awrat	Nakedness / Young Woman	عورت	عورت زبان فارسی	For Young Woman, the word "Dukhtar" or "Dukht" is used, and for Nakedness, the word "Berahneh" or "Oryan" is used
Ottoman Turkish	avrât	women	عورات		
Turkish	avrat	Woman / Wife	avrat	Turkey, Northern Cyprus	Dated; sometimes used humorously
Azerbaijani and South Azerbaijani	arvad	Woman / Wife See Aurats	arvad	Azerbaijan, Georgia, Daghestan, Iran	
Sorani Kurdish	Afrat	Woman / Wife See Aurats	ئافرەت	Iraqi Kurdistan	Another word for woman is Zhin (ژن)
Indonesian, Malay	Aurat	'awrah See Intimate parts in Islam	عورة	Brunei, Indonesia, Malaysia, Singapore	
Hindi, Urdu, Punjabi, Sindhi	Aurat	Woman / Wife See Aurats	औरत / عورت (Hindi-Urdu) ਔਰਤ / عورت (Punjabi)	India, Pakistan	
Bengali	Aorat, Aorot	Woman, wife	আওরাত, আওরত	Bengali Muslims	Differentiate with আওরাহ (aorah) meaning intimate parts

== Traditional South Asian normative around the word Aurat ==
Rudrani Gupta writes Patriarchy provides many definitions for euphemism 'achi aurat' (good woman) to be sacrificial, shy, silent and sanskari (trained in traditional etiquette of obedience and politeness) Snobra Rizwan (2019) in her study on normative in Pakistan's lower middle class highlights following linguistic euphemism.

- aurat ko baparda hona chahiye {A woman must observe veil (Purdah)}.
- Islami libas acha lagta hai. {Is mein aurat achi lagti hai; 'I like Islamic clothing. A woman looks good in it.'}
- Sharam aurat ki zeenat hoti hai {Shame or modesty is the mark of a graceful woman}.

A study analyzed a sample of 588 Punjabi proverbs specifically dealing with gender representation, collected from the dictionary "Saadey Akhaan (Our Proverbs)" by Shahbaz (2004). The findings showed that a substantial number of Punjabi proverbs in the sample targeted female characters in a negative way, while proverbs targeting males and mothers were more positive. This highlights that Punjabi proverbs reinforce patriarchal values and contribute to the perpetuation of gender biases in Punjabi society.

== Controversies ==
Writing for The Nation, Mona Hassan objected to using the word due to its etymology, saying South Asian men equate women to honor and shame, connecting ultimate reference to woman's breasts and vagina and attempt to control the same as part of their honor. Islamic interpretations and practices widely differ in what parts of women's bodies constitute the intimate, with liberal interpretations limiting to best possible, while conservative interpretations can even include a woman's voice and social existence. The latter process of thinking leads to a culture of female seclusion from public life and subjugation and violation of their human rights.

According to Anjali Bagwe, in South Asia, women are distinguished as "Aurat Jat" (women's caste) in an internalized patriarchal sense which presumes women can not be equal to men and tend to be inferior. According to Rajaa Moini, the word 'azad' holds a unique significance in the Urdu language, which inspires reverence, pride, but in the context of women, downright hostility and revulsion. In Pakistan, while an azad mulk, a free country, can be cause of celebration and revelry, an azad aurat, or a free woman, faces accusations of cultural degradation, considered like an active threat to the nation at the best, and a justification for brutal violence against her at worst. Those women who attempt any course other than misogynist patriarchal expectations are labeled stereotyped as 'napak aurat' (impious woman) and discriminated against.

== See also ==
- Aurat March
- Chador
- Cunt
- Fallen woman
- Hijab
- Historical linguistics
- Muslim conquest of Persia
- Purdah
- Women in the Arab world

== Bibliography ==
- Özcan, Asli (2 November 2021). "The Perception of Women in Trabzon Sharīʿa Court Records: Thoughts on Definitions of Women over Gender, Sexuality and Status". Hawwa. 21 (2): 147–171. doi:10.1163/15692086-bja10031. S2CID 243463941.
- Rahman, Tariq (28 November 2008). "Language, Religion and Politics: Urdu in Pakistan and North India". Revue des mondes musulmans et de la Méditerranée (124): 93–112. doi:10.4000/remmm.6019.
- Chapter 2 Familiar and Foreign: Identity in Iranian Film and Literature. United States, AU Press, 2015. over coming gender Goldin Farideh
- Rezaei-Toroghi, Mehran (May 2020). "The politics of un-truth and the assemblage of sexuality: Revisiting the Foucauldian methodology in studying sexuality in post-revolutionary Iran". Sexuality, Gender & Policy. 3 (1): 36–69. doi:10.1002/sgp2.12010. S2CID 212983241.
- Lewis, Geoffrey. The Turkish Language Reform: A Catastrophic Success. United Kingdom, Oxford University Press, 2002.
- Güner, Nurhan (2013). "Kadınla İlgili Eski Türkçe Bir Kelime: Uragut". Journal of Turkish Studies. 8 (9): 2659–2669. doi:10.7827/turkishstudies.5592.
- Haeri, Shahla (February 2009). "Sacred Canopy: Love and Sex under the Veil". Iranian Studies. 42 (1): 113–126. doi:10.1080/00210860802593965. S2CID 162260045.
- Vignato, Silvia (2014). "Sensual subjects in an Islamic epistemological arena: Negotiating the borders of aurat in Aceh". La Ricerca Folklorica (69): 67–81. JSTOR 43897027.
- Brown, George William (1930). "The Possibility of a Connection between Mitanni and the Dravidian Languages". Journal of the American Oriental Society. 50: 273–305. doi:10.2307/593090. JSTOR 593090.
- Aggarwal, Neil Krishan (April 2011). "Intersubjectivity, Transference, and the Cultural Third". Contemporary Psychoanalysis. 47 (2): 204–223. doi:10.1080/00107530.2011.10746451. S2CID 144872888.
- Abbas, Nuzhat (1999). "Conversing to/with Shame: Translation and Gender in the Urdu Ghazal". Annual of Urdu Studies. 14. hdl:1793/12097.
- Stein, H. (2006). Palatal-velar vocalism of Arabic-Persian loanwords in 16th-century Ottoman Turkish. Turkic-Iranian Contact Areas: Historical and Linguistic Aspects P.151 to 153
- Construction and Reaffirmation of Social Gender Stereotypes through the Use of Language The Case of Hindi; Page 13; Eastwards/Westwards: Which Direction for Gender Studies in the 21st Century?. United Kingdom, Cambridge Scholars, 2007.
- Pilanci, Hulya (1 December 2002). "Anadolu agizlarinda kadin icin kullanilan sozler uzerine bir inceleme". Kadin/Woman 2000. 3 (2): 71–83. Gale A12039222.
- Csató, Éva Ágnes; Isaksson, Bo; Jahani, Carina (2005). Linguistic Convergence and Areal Diffusion: Case Studies from Iranian, Semitic and Turkic. Psychology Press. p. 247. ISBN 978-0-415-30804-5.
- Sexuality in Muslim Contexts: Restrictions and Resistance. United Kingdom, Zed Books, 2012.
- Shahidian, Hammed. Women in Iran: Gender politics in the Islamic republic. United Kingdom, Greenwood Press, 2002.
- Platts, John Thompson. A Grammar of the Hindustani Or Urdu Language. United Kingdom, W.H. Allen, 1874.
