= Sherlyn Chopra =

Indian actress and model (born 1987)

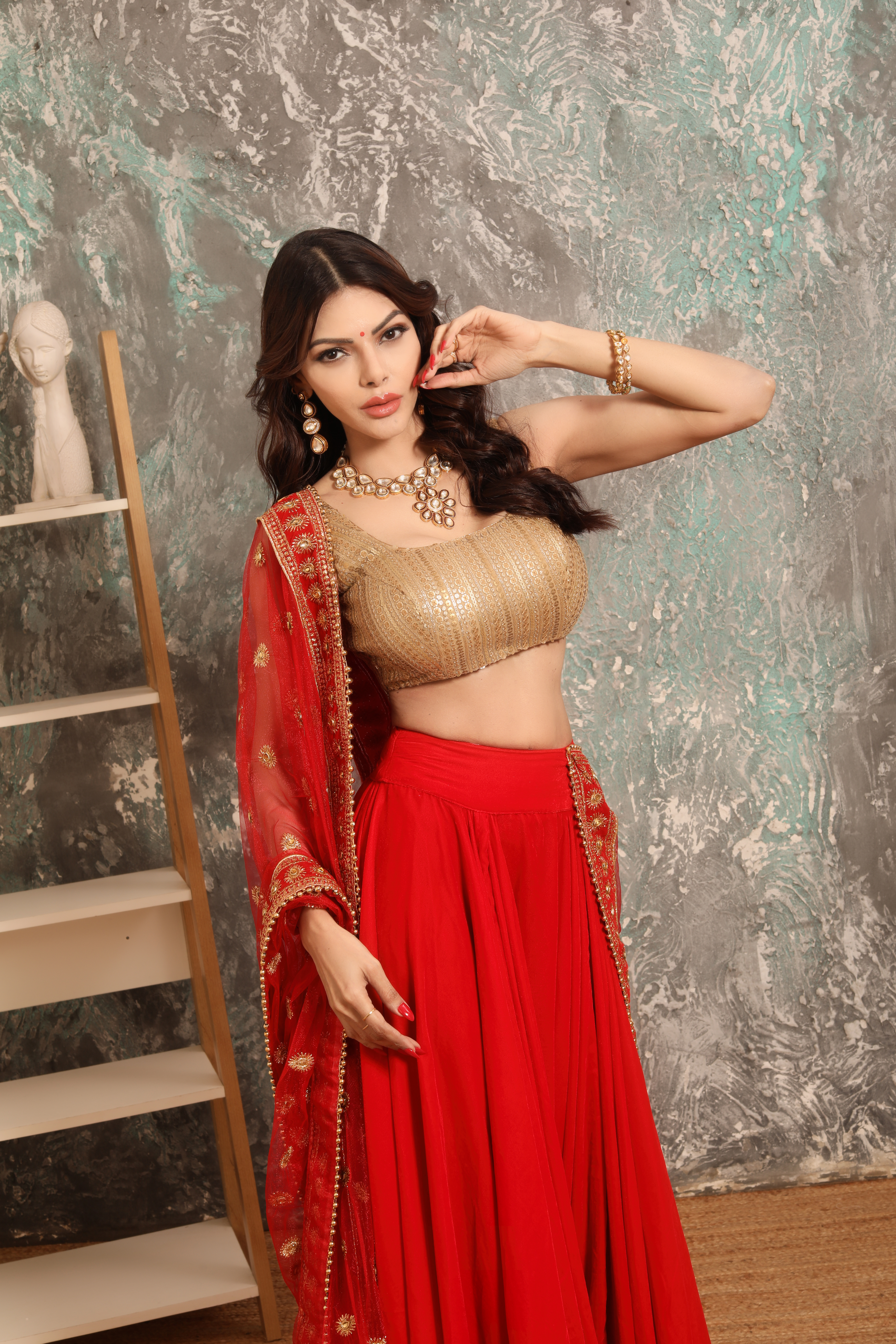
- Chopra in 2022
- Born: 11 February 1987 (age 39); Hyderabad, Andhra Pradesh, India
- Occupation: Actor
- Height: 5 ft 8 in (1.73 m)
- Beauty pageant titleholder
- Title: Miss Andhra
- Years active: 2002–present
- Major competitions: Miss Andhra Beauty Pageant; Bigg Boss 3

Sherlyn Chopra (born 11 February 1987) is an Indian actress and model known for her work in Hindi and Telugu films. She made her debut in 2007 with Red Swastik. In July 2012, Chopra gained media attention after appearing on the cover of American Playboy magazine, being the first Indian to do so, she was described as a "Bollywood legend". She was then selected to host the sixth season of the show MTV Splitsvilla. In December 2013, she released her music single titled "Bad Girl". She was a contestant in the reality show Bigg Boss in 2009.

== Early life ==
Chopra was born in Hyderabad, India to a Christian father and a Muslim mother. She has a sister who works as an emcee and an elder brother who lives in New Zealand and works as a software engineer. Her parents first met in Iran. At home, her family speaks Hindi, English, Urdu and were once active members of the Methodist Church, where Chopra was so religious that she once memorised and recited Psalm 119, verbatim in the presence of the congregation.

She attended Stanley Girls High School, where she was a studious pupil, had no friends and came about as a geek. She passed out as the school topper. Later, she got admission into Saint Ann's College for Women, Secunderabad. In 1999 she was crowned "Miss Andhra", which eventually boosted her interest towards showbiz. Chopra has stated that every voice of the MeToo movement (India) should be heard and investigated thoroughly before dismissing it as mere hearsay.

== Career ==
Chopra's started her acting career as a leading lady in Bollywood films. She appeared in films such as Time Pass, Red Swastik and Game. She made her Telugu film debut in A Film by Aravind opposite Richard Rishi. Chopra was also a contestant on Bigg Boss. She was evicted from the show on Day 27. Chopra's performance in a double role in the costume drama series, Paurashpur, received rave reviews from critics.

== Filmography ==
=== Film ===
Year	Title	Role	Language	Note(s)
2002	Allari		Telugu	Uncredited role
2005	A Film by Aravind	Nirupama	Telugu	Telugu debut
2005	Time Pass	Jenny	Hindi	
2005	Dosti: Friends Forever	Leena Bharucha	Hindi	
2006	Jawani Diwani: A Youthful Joyride	Mona	Hindi	
2006	Something Special	Mona	Telugu	
2006	Naughty Boy	Sonia	Hindi	
2007	Game	Tina	Hindi	
2007	Raqeeb		Hindi	
2007	Red Swastik	Anamika/Zeenat	Hindi	
2009	Dil Bole Hadippa!	Sonia Saluja	Hindi	
2016	Wajah Tum Ho		Hindi	Special appearance in the song "Dil Mein Chhuppa Loonga" song

=== Television ===
Year	Name	Role	Note(s)	Ref
2009	Bigg Boss 3	Contestant		
2013	MTV Splitsvilla 6	Host	Along with Nikhil Chinapa	

== Discography ==
Year	Album	Track
2007	Outrageous	"Outrageous"
2007	Outrageous	"Dard"
2007	Outrageous	"U Gimme Fever"
2007	Outrageous	"Pehli Nazar"
2007	Outrageous	"Karle Pyaar"
2007	Outrageous	"Tere Bin"
2007	Outrageous	"Outrageous - Remix"
2011		"Dard-E-Sherlyn"
2014		"Bad Girl" ft. Ikka
2019		"Tunu Tunu" ft. Vicky & Hardik
2019		"Vote Daal"
2019		"Kataar"

== See also ==
- List of people in Playboy 2010–2020
