= Aurat Pair Ki Juti Nahin Hai =

1985 film

- Directed by: B.K. Adarsh
- Written by: Ravi Kapoor, Mohan Kaul, Babu Ram Ishara
- Produced by: National Film Development Corporation of India
- Starring: Marc Zuber; Deepti Naval; Gulshan Grover
- Edited by: Rajendra
- Music by: Pankaj Udhas
- Distributed by: National Film Development Corporation of India
- Release date: 30 May 1985
- Country: India
- Language: Hindi

Aurat Pair Ki Juti Nahin Hai is a 1985 Indian drama film. The film was directed by B.K. Adarsh and stars Marc Zuber, Gulshan Grover, Sachin, and Deepti Naval in the lead. The film focused on the plight of a wife trapped in a submissive marriage. It featured a prominent ghazal by Pankaj Udhas, "Tum Na Mano Magar Haqeeqat Hai Yehi".

== Plot ==
The story is about the relationship of Rakesh and Shobha. Rakesh believes in certain principles & adheres to it sternly. Rakesh's inflexible & uncompromising principles and beliefs cause a lot of upheaval in his married life.

== Cast ==
- Sachin
- Deepti Naval
- Marc Zuber
- Gulshan Grover
- Jagdeep
