= Dilip Hiro =

Indian author, journalist and commentator (1932–2023)

- Born: 1 March 1932; Larkana, Pakistan
- Died: 19 November 2023 (aged 91)
- Occupations: Author, journalist, commentator

Dilip Hiro (1 March 1932 – 19 November 2023) was an Indian author, journalist and commentator who specialized in the politics of South Asia and West Asia. Education: Virginia Polytechnic Institute and State University, M.S., 1964.

== Career ==
Hiro originally trained as an engineer in India and the United States before moving to the UK to further his career and "explore the West".

He was also a frequent contributor to the following online magazines: The Guardian's Commentisfree; Yale University’s Yale Globalist; and the New York-based Nation Institute's website TomDispatch.

== Books ==
Non-Fiction

- Cold War in the Islamic World: Saudi Arabia, Iran and the Struggle for Supremacy (2018) ISBN 9780190944650
- The Age of Aspiration: Power, Wealth, and Conflict in Globalizing India (2016) ISBN 1620971305
- The Longest August: The Unflinching Rivalry Between India and Pakistan (2015) ISBN 1568587341
- Indians in a Globalizing World: Their Skewed Rise (2014)
- A Comprehensive Dictionary of the Middle East (2013)
- Apocalyptic Realm: Jihadists in South Asia (2012)
- After Empire: The Birth of a Multipolar World (2010) (shortlisted for the Mirabaud Prize of the Forum International Médias Nord-Sud)
- Inside Central Asia: A Political and Cultural History of Uzbekistan, Turkmenistan, Kazakhstan, Kyrgyzstan, Tajikistan, Turkey and Iran (2009) (on The Financial Times’s List of Best History Books of the Year)
- Blood of the Earth: The Battle for the World’s Vanishing Oil Resources (2007)
- The Timeline History of India (2006)
- The Iranian Labyrinth: Journeys through Theocratic Iran and Its Furies (2005)
- Secrets and Lies: Operation 'Iraqi Freedom' and After (2004)/ (Financial Times’ Best Politics and Religion Book of the Year) / (Long-listed for the George Orwell Prize for Political Writing)
- The Essential Middle East: A Comprehensive Guide (2003)
- Iraq: In The Eye Of The Storm (2002) (Best-seller in the US and UK)
- War Without End: The Rise of Islamist Terrorism and Global Response (2002), ISBN 9781136485565; Re-issued 2013)
- The Rough Guide History of India (2002)
- Neighbors, Not Friends: Iraq and Iran after the Gulf Wars (2001)
- Sharing the Promised Land: A Tale of Israelis and Palestinians (1998)
- Dictionary of the Middle East (1996)
- The Middle East (1996)
- Between Marx and Muhammad: The Changing Face of Central Asia (1995)
- Lebanon, Fire and Embers: A History of the Lebanese Civil War (1993)
- Desert Shield to Desert Storm: The Second Gulf War (1992)
- Black British, White British: A History of Race Relations in Britain (1991)
- The Longest War: The Iran-Iraq Military Conflict (1991)
- Holy Wars: The Rise of Islamic Fundamentalism (1989, Re-issued 2013)
- Iran: The Revolution Within (1988)
- Iran under the Ayatollahs (1985; Re-issued 2011)
- Inside the Middle East (1982; Re-issued 2013)
- Inside India Today (1976; Re-issued 2013) (Banned in India during 1976-77 Emergency)
- The Untouchables of India (1975)
- Black British, White British (1973)
- The Indian Family in Britain (1969)

Fiction

- Three Plays (1985)
- Interior, Exchange, Exterior (Poems, 1980)
- Apply, Apply, No Reply & A Clean Break (Two Plays, 1978)
- To Anchor a Cloud (Play, 1972)
- A Triangular View (Novel, 1969)

== Editor ==
- Babur Nama: Journal of Emperor Babur (2006)

== Contributor ==
- A World Connected: Globalization In The 21st Century (ed.) Nayan Chanda (2013)
- Encyclopedia Of Global Studies (eds.) Helmut Anheier & Mark Juergensmeyer (2012)
- The World According To Tomdispatch: America In The New Age Of Empire (ed.) Tom Englehardt (2008)
- New Makers Of Modern Culture, Vol. 2, (ed.) Justin Wintle (2007)
- New Makers Of Modern Culture, Vol. 1 (ed.) Justin Wintle (2007)
- The Iraq War Reader (eds) Micah Sifri & Christopher Serf (2003)
- A Concise History Of India (a new chapter), (2002)
- A Just Response: The Nation On Terrorism, Democracy And 11 September 2001 (ed.) Katrina vanden Heuvel (2002)
- What's it like? Life And Culture In Britain Today (eds) Joanne Collie & Alex Martin (2000)
- Iran And The Arab World (ed.) Hooshang Amirahmadi (1993)
- The Gulf War Reader (eds) Micah Sifri & Christopher Serf (1991)
- Makers Of Nineteenth Century Culture (ed.) Justin Wintle (1984)
- Pieces Of Hate (ed.) Brian Redhead & Kenneth McLeish (1982)
- Makers Of Modern Culture (ed.) Justin Wintle (1982)
- World Minorities, Vol II (ed.) Georgina Ashworth (1977)
- World Minorities, Vol I (ed.) Georgina Ashworth (1977)
- Colour, Culture And Consciousness (ed.) Bhikhu Parekh (1974)
- One For Sorrow, Two For Joy (ed.) Paul Barker (1972)
