= Shanay =

Shanay Шанай
- Ulus
- Location within Republic of Buryatia Location within Russia
- Coordinates: 51°43′N 102°51′E
- Country: Russia
- Region: Republic of Buryatia
- District: Tunkinsky District
- Time zone: UTC+8:00

Shanay (Russian: Шанай; Buryat: Шанаа, Shanaa) is a rural locality (an ulus) in Tunkinsky District, Republic of Buryatia, Russia. The population was 303 as of 2010. There are 10 streets.
