= List of Hindi songs recorded by Runa Laila =

The following is a table of all Hindi songs recorded by Runa Laila till date:

== Film songs ==
Year	Film	Song	Composer(s)	Songwriter(s)	Co-artist(s)
1976	Ek Se Badhkar Ek	"Ek Se Badhkar Ek"	Kalyanji–Anandji	Verma Malik	solo
1977	Gharonda	"Tumhen Ho Na Ho"	Jaidev	Gulzar	solo
1977	Gharonda	"Do Deewane Shehar Mein"	Jaidev	Gulzar	Bhupinder Singh
1979	Jaan-E-Bahaar	"Aye Dilwale Aao"	Bappi Lahiri	Gauhar Kanpuri	Mohammad Rafi
1983	Ek Din Bahu Ka	"Kaho Sakhi Kaho"	Bappi Lahiri	Indeevar	Bappi Lahiri
1984	Yaadgaar	"Aye Dilwale Aao"	Bappi Lahiri	Indeevar	solo
1985	Ghar Dwaar	"O Mera Babu Chhail Chhabeela"	Chitragupt	Runa Laila	solo
1990	Agneepath	"Ali Baba mil gaya Challis choro se"	Laxmikant–Pyarelal	Anand Bkashi	solo
1991	Sapnon Ka Mandir	"Main Kali Anar Ki"	Laxmikant–Pyarelal	Anand Bkashi	Aadesh Shrivastava
1995	Saajan Ke Liye	"Jaan Meri Jaan"	Bappi Lahiri	Anwar Sagar, Nawab Arzoo	solo

== Non-film songs ==
Year	Film	Song	Composer(s)	Songwriter(s)	Co-artist(s)
199?	Single	"Dekha Tujhe Toh Nazren Phisal Gaye"	Tabun	Dev Kohli	solo

== Album songs ==
S/N	Year	Album(s) Name	Language	Format	Label	No.of Tracks	Track Name(s)	Genre	Co-artist(s)	Lyricist(s)	Composer(s)
	1982	"Superuna"	Hindi	Audio CD	His Master's Voice	10	1. "Disco Premee"; 2. "Suno Suno Meri Ye Kanahi"; 3. "Iya Iya O"; 4. "Pukaro, O Kanha Tum"; 5. "Aap Ka Aur Koi Na Ho To"; 6. "Haiya Hoo"; 7. "Hello Hai"; 8. "Chalo Chalen"; 9. "Disco Express"; 10. "De De Pyar De"	Ghazal, Classical	Solo (music)	N/A	Bappi Lahiri
	1983	"Non Stop Dhamaal"	Bengali	Audio CD	His Master's Voice	2	1. "Runa Sings for Shahbaz Qalandar"; 2. "Runa Sings for Shahbaz Qalandar 2"	Folk, Classical	Solo (music)	Purnam Allahbadi	Nisar Bazmi
	1984	"D. C. S. (2)"	Hindi	Audio CD	His Master's Voice	2	1. "Mere Meherbaan"; 2. "Chal Gori"	Folk, Classical	Solo (music)	various	various
	1984	"D. C. S. (2)" (Peru Version)	Hindi	Audio CD	His Master's Voice	2	1. "Mere Meherbaan"; 2. "Chal Gori"	Folk, Classical	Solo (music)	various	various
"The Loves of Runa Laila"	1984	Hindi	Audio CD	Concord Records	16	1. "Aaj Chahe Honth Seedo"; 2. "Ab Kahan Pyar Mein"; 3. "Wadiyan Wadiyan"; 4. "Kahe Do Is Raat Se"; 5. "Meri Jaan Mein Tujhpe#; 6. "Dil Ki Haalat Ko Koi Kya"; 7. "Saiyan Ja Ja Ja Re Ja"; 8. "Surmayi Shaam"; 9. "Damadam Mast Qalander"; 10. "Sajna O Sajna"; 11. "Allah Re Is Dil Ne"; 12. "Meri Dilbar Haseena"; 13. "Ke Ghungroo Toot Gaye"; 14. "Aja Piya Bahon Mein"; 15. "O Mera Babu Chhail Chhabila"; 16. "Kat Te Hain Din Kaise Re"	Ghazal, Classical, Qawali	Solo (music)	N/A	O. P. Nayyar	
	1984	"Jhoom Lo...Jaam Thaam Lo"	Hindi	Audio CD	His Master's Voice	3	1. "Pukaro O Kanha Tum"; 2. "Suno Suno Meri Ye Kahani"; 3. "Disco Express"	Classical, Romantic	1. Shaily Shailendra; 2. Shaily Shailendra; 3. Indeevar	Bappi Lahiri	
	1985	"Runa Goes To Disco"	Hindi	Audio CD	EMI	6	1. "Pyar Tere Aye Jaan-E-Jaan"; 2. "O Ho Ho Ho Jaanan"; 3. "Tera Mera Saath Rahe"; 4. "Don't Be Silly; 5. "Aap Ko Do Ghari Fursat"; 6. "Shabaz Qalander	Ghazal, Classical, Qawali	Solo (music)	N/A	Nisar Bazmi
	1987	"Yaad-e-Sanam"	Hindi	Audio CD	His Master's Voice	5	1. "Surmayi Shaam"; 2. "Dil Ki Haalat Ko Koi Kya Jane"; 3. "Kahe Do Is Raat Se"; 4. "Wadiyan Wadiyan"; 5. "Ab Kahan Pyar Mein"	Classical, Romantic	Noor Devasi	O. P. Nayyar	
	1989	"Bappi Lahiri and Runa Laila Disco Hits" (Super Deluxe)	Hindi	CD	Columbia Records	8	1. "Disco Premee"; 2. "Suno Suno Meri Yeh Kanahi"; 3. "Iya Iya O"; 4. "Pukaro O Kahan Tum"; 5. "Aap Ka Aur Koi Na Ho To"; 6. "Haiya Hoo"; 7. 'Hello Hai"; 8. "Chalo Chalen"	Disco	solo, Bappi Lahiri (last song)	1. Anjaan; 2. Shaily Shailendra; 3. Faruk Kaiser; 4. Shaily Shailendra; 5. Indeevar; 6. Anjaan; 7. Anjaan; 8. Shiv Kumar Saroj	Bappi Lahiri
	1993	"Runa Laila" (Super Deluxe)	Hindi	CD	Gramophone Record Company of India	10	1. "Ranjish Hi Sahi"; 2. "Baat Karni Thi"; 3. "Aye Kuchh Abr"; 4. "Uzr Aane Mein Bhi"; 5. "Doob Gayi Sab Yaaden"; 6. "Kabhi Kaha Na Kisi Se"; 7. "Gulon Mein Rang Bhare"; 8. "Raat Jab Chand Se"; 9. "Tum Aaye Ho"; 10. "Garche Sou Baar"	Ghazal	solo	N/A	N/A
	2008	"The Loves of Runa Laila and Usha Uthup" (Super Deluxe)	Hindi	CD	Columbia Records	6	1. "Mera Babu Chhail Chhabila"; 2. "Damadam Mast Qalander"; 3. "Ghungroo Toot Gaye"; 4. "Allah Re Is Dil Ne"; 5. "Sajna O Sajna"; 6. "Meri Dilbar Haseena"	Ghazal	solo	N/A	N/A
