= List of awards and nominations received by Gulzar =

Gulzar awards and nominations
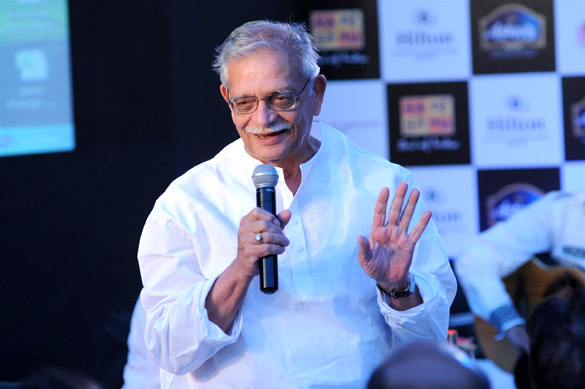
Awards and nominations
Award	Wins	Nominations
National Film Awards	6	6
Filmfare Awards	22	51
Sahitya Akademi Awards	1	1
Academy Awards	1	1
Grammy Awards	1	1
IIFA Awards	1	9
Mirchi Music Awards	2	10
Screen Awards	5	6
Zee Cine Awards	3	6
Honours	4	4

Totals (Note: Certain award groups do not simply award one winner. They acknowledge several different recipients, have runners-up, and have third place. Since this is a specific recognition and is different from losing an award, runner-up mentions are considered wins in this award tally. For simplification and to avoid errors, each award in this list has been presumed to have had a prior nomination.)
- Wins: 43
- Nominations: 92

This is a list of awards and nominations received by Indian poet, lyricist and film director Gulzar.

Gulzar was awarded the Padma Bhushan in 2004 for his contribution to the arts and the Sahitya Akademi Award in 2002. He has won 8 National Film Awards and 22 Filmfare Awards. At the 81st Academy Awards, he won the Academy Award for Best Original Song for "Jai Ho" (shared with A. R. Rahman), for the film Slumdog Millionaire. On 31 January 2010, the same song won him a Grammy Award in the category of Grammy Award for Best Song Written for a Motion Picture, Television or Other Visual Media. Gulzar has won the most Filmfare Awards for Best Lyricist (13 in total) as well as four Filmfare Awards for Best Dialogue. He was also awarded the 2012 Indira Gandhi Award for National Integration.

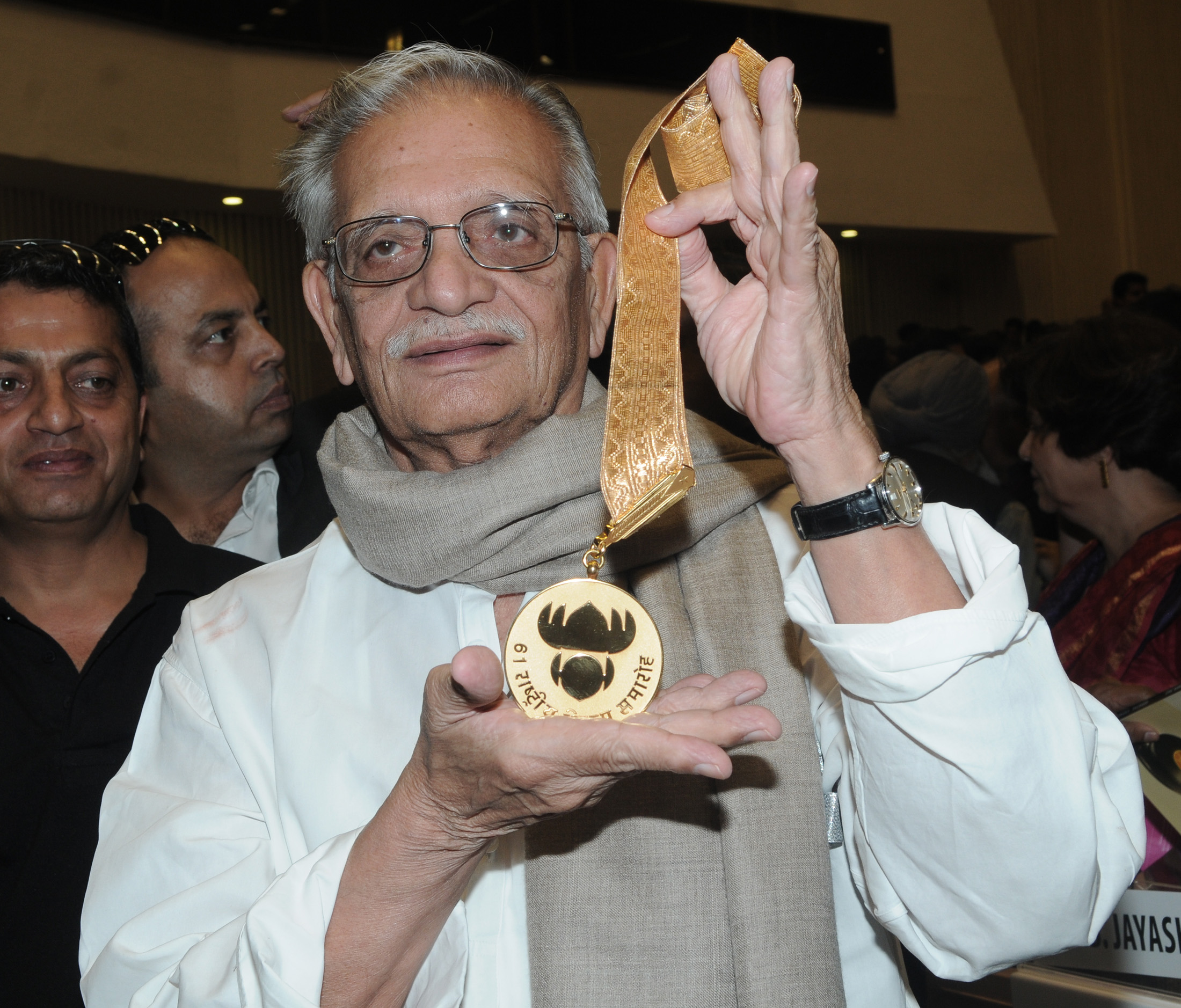
Gulzar holding his Dadasaheb Phalke Award in 2013

Gulzar received the 2013 Dadasaheb Phalke Award, the highest award of the Indian cinema, on 3 May 2014 at the 61st National Film Awards.

== Academy Awards ==
Year	Nominated work	Category	Result	Ref.
2008	"Jai Ho" (From the film Slumdog Millionaire)	Best Original Song	Won	

== IIFA Awards ==
Year	Film(s)	Category	Song	Result	Ref.
2006	Bunty Aur Babli	Best Lyricist	"Kajra Re"	Won	
2006	Paheli	Best Lyricist	"Dheere Jalna"	Nominated	
2006	Yahaan	Best Lyricist	"Naam Ada Likhna"	Nominated	
2007	Omkara	Best Lyricist	"Beedi"	Nominated	
2008	Guru	Best Lyricist	"Tere Bina"	Nominated	
2010	Kaminey	Best Lyricist	"Kaminey"	Nominated	
2011	Ishqiya	Best Lyricist	"Dil To Bachcha Hain Ji"	Nominated	
2012	7 Khoon Maaf	Best Lyricist	"Darling"	Nominated	
2019	Raazi	Best Lyricist	"Ae Watan"	Nominated	

== Filmfare Awards ==
Year	Film(s)	Category	Result	Song	Ref.
1972	Anand	Best Dialogue	Won	—N/a	
1974	Namak Haraam	Best Dialogue	Won	—N/a	
1974	Koshish	Best Story	Nominated	—N/a	
1974	Koshish	Best Director	Nominated	—N/a	
1974	Achanak	Best Director	Nominated	—N/a	
1976	Aandhi	Best Film	Nominated	—N/a	
1976	Aandhi	Best Film (Critics)	Won	—N/a	
1976	Aandhi	Best Director	Nominated	—N/a	
1976	Aandhi	Best Lyricist	Nominated	"Tere Bina Zindagi Se"	
1977	Mausam	Best Director	Won	—N/a	
1977	Mausam	Best Lyricist	Nominated	"Dil Dhoondta Hai"	
1978	Kinara	Best Director	Nominated	—N/a	
1978	Kinara	Best Lyricist	Nominated	"Naam Gum Jaayega"	
1978	Gharaonda	Best Lyricist	Won	"Do Deewaane Sheher Mein"	
1980	Gol Maal	Best Lyricist	Won	"Aanewala Pal"	
1981	Thodisi Bewafaii	Best Lyricist	Won	"Hazaar Raahen Mud Ke Dekhi"	
1982	Baseraa	Best Lyricist	Nominated	"Jahaan Pe Savera"	
1984	Masoom	Best Lyricist	Won	"Tujhse Naraaz Nahin Zindagi"	
1989	Ijaazat	Best Lyricist	Won	"Mera Kuchh Saamaan"	
1990	Amjad Ali Khan	Best Documentary	Won	—N/a	
1992	Lekin...	Best Lyricist	Won	"Yaara Seeli Seeli"	
1994	Rudaali	Best Lyricist	Nominated	"Dil Hum Hum"	
1997	Maachis	Best Director	Nominated	—N/a	
1997	Maachis	Best Story	Won	—N/a	
1997	Maachis	Best Dialogue	Won	—N/a	
1997	Maachis	Best Lyricist	Nominated	"Chappa Chappa"	
1999	Dil Se..	Best Lyricist	Won	"Chaiyya Chaiyya"	
1999	Dil Se..	Best Lyricist	Nominated	"Ae Ajnabi"	
2001	Fiza	Best Lyricist	Nominated	"Aaja Mahiya"	
2002	Lifetime Achievement Award		Honoured	—N/a	
2003	Saathiya	Best Dialogue	Won	—N/a	
2003	Saathiya	Best Lyricist	Won	"Saathiya"	
2006	Bunty Aur Babli	Best Lyricist	Won	"Kajra Re"	
2006	Bunty Aur Babli	Best Lyricist	Nominated	"Chup Chup Ke"	
2006	Paheli	Best Lyricist	Nominated	"Dheere Jalna"	
2007	Omkara	Best Lyricist	Nominated	"Beedi"	
2008	Guru	Best Lyricist	Nominated	"Tere Bina"	
2009	Yuvvraaj	Best Lyricist	Nominated	"Tu Meri Dost Hai"	
2010	Kaminey	Best Lyricist	Nominated	"Dhan Te Tan"	
2010	Kaminey	Best Lyricist	Nominated	"Kaminey"	
2011	Ishqiya	Best Lyricist	Won	"Dil To Bachcha Hain Ji"	
2012	7 Khoon Maaf	Best Lyricist	Nominated	"Darling"	
2013	Jab Tak Hai Jaan	Best Lyricist	Won	"Challa"	
2013	Jab Tak Hai Jaan	Best Lyricist	Nominated	"Saans"	
2015	Haider	Best Lyricist	Nominated	"Bismil"	
2016	Talvar	Best Lyricist	Nominated	"Zinda"	
2017	Mirzya	Best Lyricist	Nominated	"Mirzya"	
2017	Mirzya	Best Lyricist	Nominated	"Aave Re Hitchki"	
2019	Raazi	Best Lyricist	Won	"Ae Watan"	
2019	Raazi	Best Lyricist	Nominated	"Dilbaro"	
2021	Chhapaak	Best Lyricist	Won	"Chhapaak"	
2024	Sam Bahadur	Best Lyricist	Nominated	"Itni Si Baat"	

== Grammy Awards ==
Year	Nominated work	Category	Result	Ref.
2010	"Jai Ho" (From the film Slumdog Millionaire)	Best Song Written for a Motion Picture, Television or Other Visual Media	Won	

== National Film Awards ==
Year	Film(s)	Category	Result	Ref.
1972	Koshish	Best Screenplay	Won	
1975	Mausam	Second Best Feature Film	Won	
1988	"Mera Kuchh Saamaan" (From the film Ijaazat)	Best Lyrics	Won	
1991	"Yaara Seeli Seeli" (From the film Lekin...)	Best Lyrics	Won	
1991	Amjad Ali Khan	Special Jury Award (non-feature film)	Won	
1993	Pandit Bhimsen Joshi	Best Biographical Film	Won	
1996	Maachis	Best Popular Film Providing Wholesome Entertainment	Won	
2013	Dadasaheb Phalke Award		Honoured	

== Mirchi Music Awards ==
Year	Film(s)	Category	Song	Result	Ref.
2010	Ishqiya	Lyricist of The Year	"Dil To Bachcha Hai"	Won	
2010	Veer	Lyricist of The Year	"Surili Akhiyon Wale"	Nominated	
2012	Jab Tak Hai Jaan	Lyricist of The Year	"Saans"	Nominated	
2014	Haider	Lyricist of The Year	"Bismil"	Nominated	
2019	Raazi	Album of The Year	—N/a	Nominated	
2019	Raazi	Song of The Year	"Ae Watan"	Nominated	
2019	Raazi	Song of The Year	"Dilbaro"	Nominated	
2019	Raazi	Lyricist of The Year	"Ae Watan"	Won	
2019	Raazi	Lyricist of The Year	"Dilbaro"	Nominated	
2021	Chhapaak	Lyricist of The Year	"Chhapaak"	Nominated	

== Screen Awards ==
Year	Film(s)	Category	Song	Result	Ref.
1997	Maachis	Best Story	—N/a	Won	
2001	Fiza	Best Lyricist	"Tu Fiza Hai"	Nominated	
2006	Yahaan	Best Lyricist	"Naam Ada Likhna"	Won	
2007	Omkara	Best Lyricist	"Beedi"	Won	
2011	Ishqiya	Best Lyricist	"Dil To Bachcha Hai Ji"	Won	
2019	Raazi	Best Lyricist	"Ae Watan"	Won	

== Zee Cine Awards ==
Year	Film(s)	Category	Song	Result	Ref.
2002	Aśoka	Best Lyricist	"Roshni Se"	Nominated	
2003	Saathiya	Best Lyricist	"Saathiya"	Won	
2006	Bunty Aur Babli	Best Lyricist	"Kajra Re"	Won	
2013	Jab Tak Hai Jaan	Best Lyricist	"Saans"	Nominated	
2019	Raazi	Best Lyricist	"Ae Watan"	Nominated	
2019	Raazi	Best Lyricist	"Dilbaro"	Won	

== Honours ==
- 2002 — Sahitya Akademi Award for "Dhuan".
- 2004 – Padma Bhushan – India's third highest civilian honour from the Government of India.
- 2004 — Sahir Award presented by Adeeb International (Sahir Cultural Academy).
- 2004 – Bengal Film Journalists' Association – Satyajit Ray Lifetime Achievement Award.
- 2012 – Indira Gandhi Award for National Integration.
