= 25th Filmfare Awards =

1978 awards for Hindi cinema

- Date: 1978
- Site: Bombay

Highlights
- Best Film: Bhumika
- Best Actor: Amitabh Bachchan for Amar Akbar Anthony
- Best Actress: Shabana Azmi for Swami
- Most awards: Amar Akbar Anthony, Hum Kisise Kum Naheen & Swami (3)
- Most nominations: Amar Akbar Anthony & Hum Kisise Kum Naheen (7)

The 25th Filmfare Awards for Hindi cinema were held in Bombay in 1978.

Amar Akbar Anthony and Hum Kisise Kum Naheen led the ceremony with 7 nominations each, followed by Gharaonda and Swami with 6 nominations each.

Amar Akbar Anthony, Hum Kisise Kum Naheen and Swami won 3 awards each, thus becoming the most-awarded films at the ceremony.

Shyam Benegal's Bhumika won Best Film, starting a run where 3 films by Shyam Benegal won Best Film in 5 years.

Sanjeev Kumar received dual nominations for Best Actor for his performances in Yehi Hai Zindagi and Zindagi, but lost to Amitabh Bachchan, who himself received dual nominations in the category for his performances in Adalat and Amar Akbar Anthony, winning for the latter, his first win in the category.

Shriram Lagoo also received dual nominations for Best Supporting Actor for his performances in Gharaonda and Kinara, winning for the former.

== Main awards ==
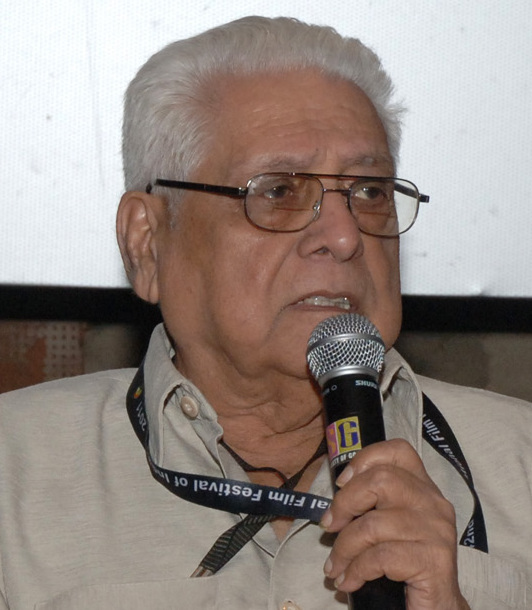
Basu Chatterjee — Best Director winner for Swami

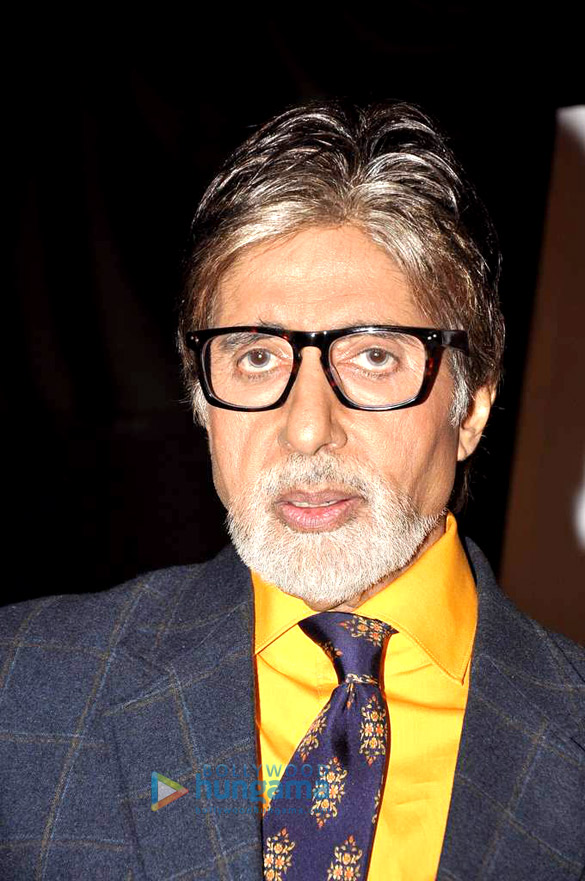
Amitabh Bachchan — Best Actor winner for Amar Akbar Anthony

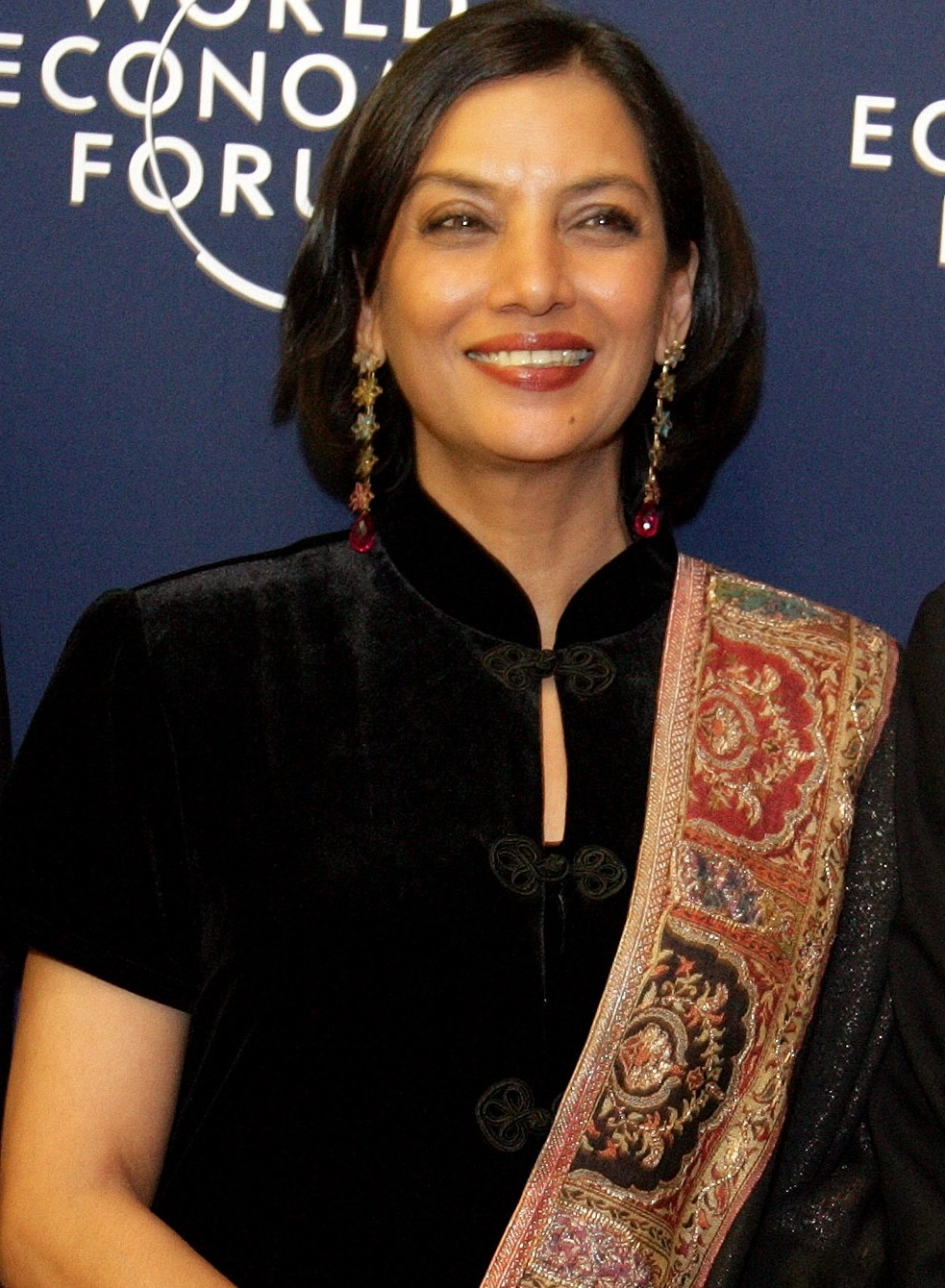
Shabana Azmi — Best Actress winner for Swami

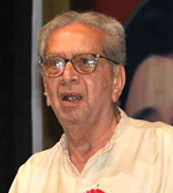
Shriram Lagoo — Best Supporting Actor winner for Gharaonda

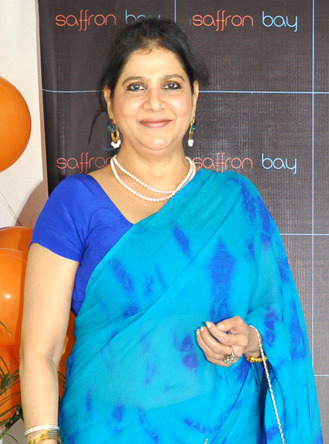
Asha Sachdev — Best Supporting Actress winner for Priyatama

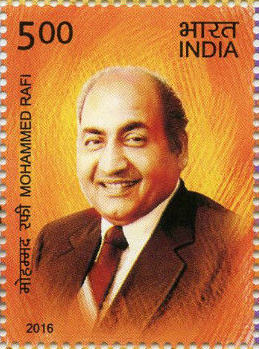
Mohammed Rafi — Best Playback singer, Male winner for "Kya Hua Tera Vaada" (Hum Kisise Kum Naheen)

=== Best Film ===
Bhumika

- Amar Akbar Anthony
- Gharaonda
- Manthan
- Swami

=== Best Director ===
Basu Chatterjee – Swami

- Asrani – Chala Murari Hero Banne
- Bhimsain – Gharaonda
- Gulzar – Kinara
- Manmohan Desai – Amar Akbar Anthony

=== Best Actor ===
Amitabh Bachchan – Amar Akbar Anthony

- Amitabh Bachchan – Adalat
- Sanjeev Kumar – Yehi Hai Zindagi
- Sanjeev Kumar – Zindagi
- Vinod Khanna – Shaque

=== Best Actress ===
Shabana Azmi – Swami

- Hema Malini – Kinara
- Raakhee – Doosra Aadmi
- Smita Patil – Bhumika
- Zarina Wahab – Gharaonda

=== Best Supporting Actor ===
Shreeram Lagoo – Gharaonda

- Shreeram Lagoo – Kinara
- Tariq – Hum Kisise Kum Naheen
- Vikram – Aadmi Sadak Ka
- Vinod Mehra – Anurodh

=== Best Supporting Actress ===
Asha Sachdev – Priyatama

- Aruna Irani – Khoon Pasina
- Farida Jalal – Shaque
- Nazneen – Dildaar
- Raakhee – Doosra Aadmi

=== Best Comic Actor ===
Paintal – Chala Murari Hero Banne

- Deven Verma – Doosra Aadmi
- Keshto Mukherjee – Chacha Bhatija
- Manik Dutt – Safed Jhoot
- Mukri – Tyaag

=== Best Story ===
Swami – Sarat Chandra Chattopadhyay

- Chala Murari Hero Banne – Asrani
- Doosra Aadmi – Raju Saigal
- Gharaonda – Shankar Shesh
- Kinara – Bhusan Bangali

=== Best Screenplay ===
Dulhan Wohi Jo Piya Man Bhaye – Lekh Tandon, Vrajendra Gaur and Madhusudan Kalelkar

=== Best Dialogue ===
Dulhan Wohi Jo Piya Man Bhaye – Vrajendra Gaur

=== Best Music Director ===
Amar Akbar Anthony – Laxmikant–Pyarelal

- Alaap – Jaidev
- Hum Kisise Kum Naheen – R.D. Burman
- Kinara – R.D. Burman
- Swami – Rajesh Roshan

=== Best Lyricist ===
Gharaonda – Gulzar for Do Deewana Sheher Main

- Amar Akbar Anthony – Anand Bakshi for Parda Hai Parda
- Hum Kisise Kum Naheen – Majrooh Sultanpuri for Kya Hua Tera Wada
- Kinara – Gulzar for Naam Gum Jaayega
- Manthan – Priti Sagar for Mero Gaam Katha Parey

=== Best Playback Singer, Male ===
Hum Kisise Kum Naheen – Mohammed Rafi for Kya Hua Tera Wada

- Amar Akbar Anthony – Mohammed Rafi for Parda Hai Parda
- Anurodh – Kishore Kumar for Aap Ke Anurodh
- Mukti – Mukesh for Suhaani Chandni
- Swami – K.J. Yesudas for Aaye Na Balam

=== Best Playback Singer, Female ===
Manthan – Priti Sagar for Mero Gaam Katha Parey

- Hum Kisise Kum Naheen – Sushma Shrestha for Kya Hua Tera Wada
- Inkaar – Usha Mangeshkar for O Mungada Mungada
- Taxi Taxie – Asha Bhosle for Laayi Kahaan Hai Zindagi

=== Best Art Direction ===
Hum Kisise Kum Naheen – Shanti Das

=== Best Cinematography ===
Hum Kisise Kum Naheen – Munir Khan

=== Best Editing ===
Amar Akbar Anthony – Kamlakar Karkhanis

=== Best Sound ===
Agent Vinod – Dinshaw Billmoria

== Critics' awards ==
=== Best Film ===
Shatranj Ke Khiladi

=== Best Documentary ===
Transformations

== Biggest Winners ==
- Swami – 3/6
- Amar Akbar Anthony – 3/7
- Hum Kisise Kum Naheen – 3/7
- Dulhan Wohi Jo Piya Man Bhaye – 2/2
- Gharaonda – 2/6

== See also ==
- 27th Filmfare Awards
- 26th Filmfare Awards
- Filmfare Awards
