= Dooriyaan =

1979 Indian Hindi drama film by Bhimsain

- Directed by: Bhimsain
- Screenplay by: Bhimsain
- Dialogues by: Shanker Shesh
- Story by: Shanker Shesh
- Produced by: Bhimsain
- Starring: Uttam Kumar; Sharmila Tagore; Shreeram Lagoo
- Cinematography: Apurba Kishore Bir
- Edited by: Ishwar Chandra
- Music by: Songs: Jaidev; Background score: Jeetu–Tapan
- Production company: Climb Films
- Distributed by: Climb Films
- Release date: 6 July 1979
- Running time: 121 minutes
- Country: India
- Language: Hindi

Dooriyaan (Hindi pronunciation: [duːriːjɑ̃]; transl. Distances) is a 1979 Hindi-language drama film co-written, produced and directed by Bhimsain under the banner of Climb Films, from a story by Shanker Shesh. It stars Uttam Kumar and Sharmila Tagore in the lead roles, while Shreeram Lagoo, Kireet Khurana and Sudha Chopra play supporting roles. The film follows a married and career-focused couple's personal ambitions leading to marital discord and their eventual separation.

The film pairs Kumar and Tagore for the sixth time, also marking Kumar's sixth film in Hindi cinema. The soundtrack of the film is composed by Jaidev, with lyrics penned by Sudarshan Faakir. A. K. Bir handled its cinematography, while Ishwar Chandra edited the film.

Dooriyaan was theatrically released on 6 July 1979, opening to positive reviews; critics were appraisal of its story, direction, cinematography and the performances by Kumar and Tagore. Despite its chartbuster soundtrack, the film became a box-office bomb.

== Plot ==
Kailash is an eminent advertising agency executive and his working wife Ratna a renowned theatre actress. Soon, the pull of the stage gets stronger which results in the neglect of the baby, the home and the husband which generates tensions and violent outbursts culminating in a physical separation, with Kailash leaving the house and baby behind. Ratna ultimately has to surrender the Agency's flat and moves into another flat belonging to the theatres producer. Kailash by sheer chance discovers Ratnas new flat. He now visits his daughter every day while Ratna is away and even takes the child out for ice-creams and joy rides. During one of these surreptitious visits, Kailash just in time to rescue his daughter who had swallowed a marble and would have died of choking, but for Kailash timely medical help. Ratna, though obliged to Kailash, still continues with her obsession for the theatre. On the day of the premiere of forthcoming play, Ratna implores Kailash to stay home with the baby. Kailash pretends not to have heard Ratna. On rushing home after the premiere, Ratna is stunned to find her daughter missing. A letter left by Kailash says, "I wont let the child get sacrificed at the altar of your ambitions....." Realism dawns on the shattered Ratna, who stops out of the house in search of her daughter, being stricken.

== Cast ==
- Uttam Kumar as Kailash
- Sharmila Tagore as Ratna
- Shreeram Lagoo as Prabhakar
- Kireet Khurana as Moju
- Sulabha Deshpande as maid
- Arvind Deshpande
- Sudha Chopra as Kailash's sister-in-law
- Priyadarshinee as Laxmi

=== Special appearances ===
- Jalal Agha as News Paper Vendor

== Soundtrack ==
The soundtrack of the film is composed by Jaidev, while Jeetu–Tapan provided its score. All the tracks are penned by Sudarshan Faakir.

Track listing
No.	Title	Singer(s)	Length
1.	"Zindagi Mere Ghar Aana"	Bhupinder Singh, Anuradha Paudwal	6:15
2.	"Zindagi Me Jab Tumhare Gham Nahin The"	Bhupinder Singh, Anuradha Paudwal	5:22
3.	"Evening News"	Manna Dey	5:34
4.	"Khota Paisa Nahi Chalega"	K. N. Sharma, Ranu Mukherjee, Preeti Sagar	6:21
Total length:			23:33
