= Do Deewaane Sheher Mein =

Song by Runa Laila Bhupinder Singh
- Language: Hindi
- Released: 1977
- Composer: Jaidev
- Lyricist: Gulzar

"Do Deewaane Sheher Mein" is an Indian Hindi song from the Bollywood film Gharaonda. (1977). The film was directed by Bhimsain Khurana. The lyrics of the song was written by Gulzar, and the music was composed by Jaidev. In 1977 Gulzar won his first Filmfare Award for Best Lyricist for this song. The song was sung by Bhupinder Singh and Runa Laila. The song has a reprise "Ek Akela Is Sheher Mein".

== Awards and reception ==
The song received the following awards:

Year	Award	Category	Recipient	Ref
1977	Filmfare Award	Best lyricist of the year	Gulzar	

== In popular culture ==
The 2026 Hindi-language romantic drama Do Deewane Seher Mein, starring Siddhant Chaturvedi and Mrunal Thakur, borrows its name from the song and features its recreation by Jackie Vanjari.
