= Ankahee =

Ankahee may refer to:

- Ankahee (1985 film), a 1985 Indian Hindi film
- Ankahee (2006 film), an Indian film directed by Vikram Bhatt
