= National Film Award for Best Animation Film =

Indian film award

- National award for contributions to non-feature film
- Sponsored by: National Film Development Corporation of India
- Rewards: Rajat Kamal (Silver Lotus); ₹2,00,000
- First award: 1967
- Most recent winner: A Coconut Tree (2022)

The National Film Award for Best Animation Film is one of the National Film Awards presented annually by the National Film Development Corporation of India. It is one of several awards presented for non-feature films and awarded with Golden Lotus (Swarna Kamal).

The award was instituted in 1967, at 15th National Film Awards and awarded annually for films produced in the year across the country, in all Indian languages.

== Awards ==
All the awardees are awarded with 'Rajat Kamal' (Silver Lotus Award) and cash prize. Award winners include Producer, Director and Animator of the film.

Cash prize amount varied over the period. Following table illustrates the cash prize amount over the years:

Year (Period)	Cash prize
1967–1973	Producer: A Medal and ₹5,000 (US$53); Director: A Plaque and ₹2,000 (US$21)
1974–1976	Producer: Rajat Kamal and ₹5,000 (US$53); Director: Rajat Kamal and ₹4,000 (US$43)
1977–1980	Producer: Rajat Kamal and ₹5,000 (US$53); Director: Rajat Kamal and ₹5,000 (US$53); Animator: Rajat Kamal and ₹4,000 (US$43)
1981–1983	Producer, Director and Animator: Rajat Kamal and ₹5,000 (US$53) Each
1982–2005	Producer, Director and Animator: Rajat Kamal and ₹10,000 (US$110) Each
2006–2021	Producer, Director and Animator: Rajat Kamal and ₹50,000 (US$530) Each
2022–present	Producer, Director and Animator: Rajat Kamal and ₹2 lakh (US$2,100) Each

Following are the winners over the years:

Indicates a joint award for that year

List of award films, showing the year (award ceremony), language(s), producer(s), director(s) and animator(s)
Year	Film(s)	Language(s)	Producer(s)	Director(s)	Animator(s)	Refs.
1967 (15th)	Inquiry	Music only	C. T. Baptista	C. T. Baptista		
1968 (16th)	Nag Aur Kauwa	Hindi	Children's Film Society	S. B. Nayampally		
1969 (17th)	Umbrella	English	G. K. Gokhale for Films Division	B. R. Shendge		
1970 (18th)	No Award					
1971 (19th)	No Award					
1972 (20th)	You Said It	English	Prasad Productions	Ram Mohan		
1973 (21st)	No Award					
1974 (22nd)	Synthesis	English	B. R. Shendge	A. R. Sen and B. R. Dohling		
1975 (23rd)	Business is People	English	Akbar Films	Kantilal Rathod		
1976 (24th)						
1977 (25th)	Prakriti Ka Niyam	Hindi	G. P. Asthana	B. R. Shendge	V. G. Samant	
1978 (26th)	No Award					
1979 (27th)						
1980 (28th)	No Award					
1981 (29th)	The Thinker?	English	B. R. Shendge	A. R. Sen	M. Paralkar	
1982 (30th)	Raju and Tinku	English	Children's Film Society	Ajoy Kumar Chakrabarty	Ajoy Kumar Chakrabarty	
1983 (31st)	Fire Games	English	Ranabir Ray	Ram Mohan	Naik Satam and Bapu Parulekar	
1983 (31st)	A Race With Death	English	B. R. Shedge	Yash Choudhary	V. G. Samant and V. K. Wankhede	
1984 (32nd)	National Highway	English	National Institute of Design	R. N. Mistry	R. N. Mistry	
1985 (33rd)	Karuna Ki Vijay	Hindi	Children's Film Society	K. S. Bansod	K. S. Bansod	
1986 (34th)	A. B. See	English	P. B. Pendharkar	Arun Gongade	Arun Gongade	
1987 (35th)	End Game	English	B. R. Shendge	Arun Gongade	Arun Gongade	
1988 (36th)	No Award					
1989 (37th)	My Tree	Music only	Vijay B. Chandra	B. R. Shendge and R. R. Swamy	R. R. Swamy and V. S. Shankardas	
1990 (38th)	No Award					
1991 (39th)	Ballu Shah	Hindi	Children's Film Society	Rajesh Aggarwal	S. M. Hasan	
1992 (40th)	Gaaye Ki Sachai	Hindi	Climb Films and N'CYP	Bhimsain	Bhimsain	
1992 (40th)	The Threads	English	B. R. Shendge	Girish Rao	Girish Rao	
1993 (41st)	Chetak	Hindi	N'CYP	V. G. Samant	V. G. Samant	
1994 (42nd)	Mahagiri	Hindi	Bhimsain	Kireet Khurana	S. M. Hasan	
1995 (43rd)	O	English	Bhimsain	Kireet Khurana	Kireet Khurana	
1996 (44th)	The Lost Horizon	Music only	Arun Gongade	Arun Gongade	Arun Gongade	
1997 (45th)	Trade: Commerce	Music only	Bhimsain	Kireet Khurana		
1998 (46th)	Education Only Her Future	Music only	Arun Gongade	Arun Gongade	Arun Gongade	
1999 (47th)	No Award					
2000 (48th)	The Landscape	Music only	Bankim for Films Division	Ravi Jadhav for Films Division		
2001 (49th)	The Pink Camel	Hindi	Children's Film Society	Paushali Ganguli	Paushali Ganguli	
2002 (50th)	No Award					
2003 (51st)	Jeo Aur Jeene Do	Hindi	Children's Film Society	B. R. Sarnaik	Harshad Sayeed Noori	
2004 (52nd)	Raju and I	English and Hindi	Aseema Charitable Trust	Gayatri Rao	Chetan Sharma	
2005 (53rd)	Kachua Aur Khargosh	Hindi	Ramesh Sharma and Uma Gajapati Raju	C. B. Arun	Moving Picture Company	
2006 (54th)	Nokpokliba	English	Children's Film Society	Meren Imchen		
2007 (55th)	No Award					
2008 (56th)	Prince and The Crown of Stones	English	Children's Film Society	Gautam Benegal	Gautam Benegal	
2009 (57th)	No Award					
2010 (58th)	No Award					
2011 (59th)	No Award					
2012 (60th)	No Award					
2013 (61st)	No Award					
2014 (62nd)	Sound of Joy	English	Aura Cinematics	Sukankan Roy	Rishi Sahany	
2015 (63rd)	Fisherwoman And Tuktuk	Music only	Nilima Eriyat	Suresh Eriyat	Studio Eeksaurus Productions	
2016 (64th)	Hum Chitra Banate Hai	Hindi	IDC, IIT Bombay	Nina Sabnani	Piyush Varma and Shyam Sundar Chatterjee	
2017 (65th)	Tokri – The Basket	Music only	Nilima Eriyat	Suresh Eriyat	Studio Eeksaurus Productions	
2017 (65th)	The Fish Curry	Hindi	Munish Tewari	Abhishek Verma	Abhishek Verma	
2018 (66th)	No Award					
2019 (67th)	Radha	Music only	Fairy Cows	Bimal Poddar	Nitin Kharkar	
2020 (68th)	No Award					
2021 (69th)	Kandittundu	Malayalam	Studio Eeksaurus Productions	Adithi Krishnadas		
2022 (70th)	A Coconut Tree	English	JB Productions	Joshy Benedict	Joshy Benedict	
2023 (71st)	No Award					
2024 (72nd)	Touched as Water	Silent	Joshy Benedict	Joshy Benedict	Joshy Benedict	
