= Alaap =

- Movie poster
- Directed by: Hrishikesh Mukherjee
- Written by: Rahi Masoom Raza; Biren Tripathy; Jehan Nayyar (Dialogue)
- Screenplay by: Bimal Dutta
- Story by: Hrishikesh Mukherjee
- Produced by: Hrishikesh Mukherjee; N. C. Sippy; Romu N. Sippy
- Starring: Amitabh Bachchan; Rekha; Chhaya Devi; Asrani; Farida Jalal; Om Prakash
- Cinematography: Jaywant Pathare
- Edited by: Khan Zaman Khan
- Music by: Jaidev
- Distributed by: Rupam Chitra
- Release date: 8 April 1977
- Running time: 150 minutes
- Country: India
- Language: Hindi

Alaap (lit. Prelude) is a 1977 Indian musical drama film directed by Hrishikesh Mukherjee and produced by N. C. Sippy and Mukherjee. It stars Amitabh Bachchan, Rekha, Chhaya Devi, Asrani, Farida Jalal, Om Prakash, Lily Chakravarty in the lead and Sanjeev Kumar in a small role.

Upon release, Alaap failed to do well commercially owing to its depressing theme and Bachchan's "Angry Young Man" image at that time, but attained cult status in later years and is regarded as one of Mukherjee's most underrated works. At the 25th Filmfare Awards, Jaidev was nominated for Best Music Direction.

The film is available for digital streaming on Amazon Prime Video and SonyLIV.

== Plot ==
Widowed Advocate Triloki Prasad (Om Prakash) lives a wealthy lifestyle in a small town in India with two sons, Advocate Ashok (Vijay Sharma) married to Geeta (Lily Chakravarty) and Alok (Amitabh Bachchan) who has yet to settle down in their law firm. Alok is fond of music and enrolls in classes run by Pandit Jamuna Prasad (A. K. Hangal). On his return, his father asks him to accompany Ashok to their law firm and start learning to practice, which he agrees to do. One day, Triloki finds out that Alok has not been going the firm but is instead spending time in the local slums with a former courtesan named Sarju Bai Banaraswali (Chhaya Devi). He cautions Alok about this, but Alok continues to visit Sarju Bai. When Mr. Gupta (Yunus Parvez) approaches Triloki about taking possession and demolishing the slum area, Triloki readily agrees and with his expertise manages to sway the Court's decision in Gupta's favor. As a result, Sarju Bai and others are rendered homeless. With the fee he receives from Gupta, he asks Alok to purchase a used car for himself. But Alok purchases a horse-carriage and decides to drive it himself to make a living. His enraged father asks him to leave the house. When Triloki finds out that Alok is doing well in his work, he decides to hire motor coaches to transport people at a much cheaper price, thus cutting off Alok's earnings and perhaps forcing him to reconsider his decision, apologize, and return home to his father. The remainder of the film deals with Alok battling all contradiction, and if the father-son duo continue to harbour their differences.

== Cast ==
- Amitabh Bachchan as Alok Prasad
- Rekha as Radhakumari (Radhiya)
- Om Prakash as Advocate Triloki Prasad
- Vijay Sharma as Ashok Prasad
- Lily Chakraborty as Geeta A. Prasad
- Master Ravi as Alok & Radha's son
- Chhaya Devi as Sarju Bai Banaraswali
- Asrani as Ganesh (Ganeshi)
- Manmohan Krishna as Maharaj Dinanath
- Farida Jalal as Sulakshana Gupta
- Yunus Parvez as Mr. Gupta
- Lalita Kumari as Mrs. Gupta
- Benjamin Gilani as Kishan
- A. K. Hangal as Pandit Jamuna Prasad (Guest Appearance)
- Sanjeev Kumar as Raja Bahadur (Guest Appearance)
- Jhumur - Guest Appearance

== Crew ==
- Director - Hrishikesh Mukherjee
- Story - Hrishikesh Mukherjee
- Screenplay - Bimal Dutta
- Dialogue - Rahi Masoom Raza, Biren Tripathy, Jehan Nayyar
- Editor - Khan Zaman Khan
- Producer - Hrishikesh Mukherjee, N.C. Sippy, Romu N. Sippy
- Production Company - Rupam Chitra
- Cinematographer - Jaywant Pathare
- Art Director - Ajit Banerjee
- Costume Designer - Bhanu Athaiya, Shalini Shah
- Costume and Wardrobe - Babu Ghanekar

== Soundtrack ==
Alaap

Soundtrack album by Jaidev
- Released: 1977
- Genre: Feature film soundtrack

The music was composed by Jaidev and the lyrics were penned by Rahi Masoom Raza except for the song "Koi Gata Main So Jata", which was written by Harivansh Rai Bachchan.

No.	Title	Singer(s)	Length
1.	"Aai Ritu Sawan Ki"	Bhupinder Singh, Kumari Faiyaz	3:33
2.	"Binati Sun Le Tanik"	Asrani	3:38
3.	"Chand Akela Jaye Sakhi Ri"	K. J. Yesudas	3:36
4.	"Chand Akela"	Yesudas	3:26
5.	"Ho Rama Dar Lage Apni Umariya Se"	Asrani	3:27
6.	"Kahe Manva Nache"	Lata Mangeshkar	3:11
7.	"Koi Gata Main So Jata (Raga Bihag)"	Yesudas	3:31
8.	"Mata Saraswati Sharda (Raga Bhairavi)"	Lata Mangeshkar, Dilraj Kaur	3:49
9.	"Mata Saraswati Sharda"	Yesudas, Dilraj Kaur, Madhurani	3:30
10.	"Nai Ri Lagan Aur Meethi Batiyan"	Yesudas, Madhurani, Kumari Faiyaz	3:56
11.	"Zindagi Ko Sanwarna Hoga (Raga Ahir Bhairav)"	Yesudas	3:36
