= Toonpur Ka Superrhero =

2010 Indian film by Kireet Khurana

- Theatrical Release Poster
- Directed by: Kireet Khurana
- Written by: Raagii Bhatnagar
- Produced by: Kumar Mangat Pathak
- Starring: Ajay Devgn; Kajol
- Narrated by: Sanjay Dutt
- Cinematography: Nirmal Jani
- Music by: Anu Malik; Rishi Rich
- Production companies: Big Screen Entertainment; Climb Media
- Distributed by: Eros International
- Release date: 24 December 2010
- Running time: 95 minutes
- Country: India
- Language: Hindi
- Budget: ₹25 crore
- Box office: ₹7.09 crore

Toonpur Ka Superrhero (transl. Toonpur's Superhero) is a 2010 Indian Hindi-language live-action animated action comedy film written by Raagii Bhatnagar and directed by Kireet Khurana. The film features Ajay Devgn and Kajol in lead roles. The film was India's first live action - 3D animation combination feature film. It was released on 24 December 2010 and emerged as a commercial failure.

== Plot ==
The story is based on Aditya Kumar, a famous actor who plays a very famous superhero on TV and acts in films as well. He lives in a nice village of sorts with his family, which consists of his wife, Priya, and two children, Kabir and Raima. He frequently tries to explain to his son that all cartoons are fake and that he shouldn't waste his time watching them. Kabir gets irritated, and one night tells him that he is a "fake" hero too, for his stunts are performed by doubles. Feeling humiliated, he leaves home and is soon kidnapped by the cartoons his son watches. They kidnap him because they overhear two people talking and saying that Aditya is a famous hero. This kidnapping is done through a series of underground mazes, tunnels, and sewers. On waking up, he finds himself in an animated world. A group of cartoons greets him, identifying themselves as "Devtoons," i.e., the good cartoons. They try to convince Aditya to fight Jagaro, a powerful villain, to protect their existence and save their king.

Aditya initially hesitates, but when a character from Toonpur named Bolly says he is a fake hero, he feels humiliated but then agrees to fight so that he can prove that he is a real superhero to everyone, and particularly his son. Aditya and his cartoon friends attack Jagaro's base, defeat the "Toonasurs," i.e., the evil cartoons, and save the King, Tooneshwar, but in the process, many of their friends get kidnapped by Jagaro. Now the only option left for Aditya is to get the "Toonastra," a pencil-and-eraser-shaped overpowered weapon from Rubdoot (the supposed God of Destruction in Toonpur), and erase Jagaro from existence using its tremendous strength. He goes to meet Rubdoot, where it is discovered that Rubdoot is a hardcore fan of Aditya as a superhero. Aditya manages to get the Toonastra; however, Rubdoot warns him, saying that he can use this weapon only once, the reason being that this weapon needs constant charging, and Rubdoot himself is the charger. Aditya leaves, promising Rubdoot that if the weapon worked, he would make Rubdoot his best friend. This makes Rubdoot emotional, who promises to wait as well.

However, Jagaro gets to know of the plan concocted by the Devtoons and kidnaps Aditya's family to prevent his own demise. However, Aditya challenges Jagaro to a game- a final fight. Jagaro agrees, and the game starts at his gaming club. Aditya manages to complete the first level, which is wild-west themed, by rescuing Priya from the Toonasurs and destroying them. In the second round, Priya plays a pivotal role in crossing the traps successfully and saving Raima and the Devtoons with her ingenuity. Jagaro uses many methods of cunning and deceit throughout the rounds to prevent Aditya's victory. The third round is the final duel between Aditya and Jagaro, which Aditya manages to win after a long struggle. Afterwards, Kabir finally accepts his father as a real hero, which finally makes Aditya happy. Rubdoot is given Aditya's autograph and becomes his best friend. The end of the movie shows Aditya leaving the Devtoons in peace and Toonpur in a joyous celebration.

== Cast ==
=== Live-action cast ===
- Ajay Devgn as Aditya Kumar
- Kajol as Priya Kumar (née Verma), Aditya's wife
- Tanuja as Shruti Verma, Priya's mother (special appearance)
- Amey Pandya as Kabeer, Aditya's son
- Chinky Jaiswal as Raima Kumar, Aditya's daughter
- Sanjay Mishra as Shyam
- Delnaaz Paul as Ramola
- Mukesh Tiwari as Inspector Kitkite
- Raza Murad as Police Commissioner

=== Voice Cast ===
- Sanjay Dutt as Narrator
- Jigna Bhardwaj as Bolly
- Priya Fonesca as Loveena
- Ganesh Divenkar as Pandu, Kansasur, Bakbakasur, Gullu
- Dinpal as Guppy
- Rupa Bhimani as Bigben
- Ramki as Lappy, Sherappan
- Vinod Kulkarni as Professor Homi, Putch, Ostrich, Rubdoot
- K. Sharma as Gyandev
- Uday Sabnis as Jagaro
- Asif as Cheeno Moto
- Dishi as Monika
- Mubeen Farooqi as Chugli
- Ramesh as Tooneshwar

== Soundtrack ==
The film's music was composed by Anu Malik, with lyrics by Mumzy, and was released on 14 December 2010.

No.	Title	Performer(s)	Length
1.	"Let's Go to Toonpur"	Mumzy Stranger, Veronica Mehta, H-Dhami, Anu Malik
2.	"Nach Mere Naal"	Master Saleem, Alisha Chinai, Mumzy Stranger
3.	"Jeetoge Tum"	Javed Ali, Roop Kumar Rathod
4.	"Rubdoot"	Altaf Raja, Ajay Devgan, Sonu Nigam, Sudesh Bhonsle
5.	"Baliye"	Hard Kaur, Shaan
6.	"Let's Go to Toonpur" (Remix)	Mumzy Stranger, Veronica, H-Dhami, Anu Malik
7.	"Nach Mere Naal" (Remix)	Master Salim, Alisha, Mumzy Stranger

== Critical reception ==
Toonpur Ka Superhero received mixed reviews. The Times of India rated the film 3 out of 5, praising the performances and storyline. Kaveree Bamzai from India Today rated the film 1 out of 5, terming the film as "Toonathon that's an exercise in torture". Sukanya Verma from Rediff.com rated the film 2.5 out of 5.

Sudhish Kamath from The Hindu criticised the film with no ratings. Mayank Shekhar from Hindustan Times rated the film 2 out of 5.

== See also ==
- Indian animation industry
