= Goonj (1989 film) =

- Promotional Poster
- Directed by: Jalal Agha
- Written by: Jalal Agha, Naqi Ahmed
- Produced by: Joy Augustine
- Starring: Kumar Gaurav; Juhi Chawla; Tinnu Anand; Binju Ali
- Music by: Biddu
- Release date: 7 March 1989 (India)
- Running time: 142 minutes
- Country: India
- Language: Hindi

Goonj is a 1989 Indian Hindi-language film directed by Jalal Agha and produced by Joy Augustine, starring Kumar Gaurav, Juhi Chawla and Tinnu Anand.

== Cast ==
- Kumar Gaurav as Sanjeev Kamat
- Juhi Chawla as Sangeeta Kalekar
- Tinnu Anand as Father Mario
- Binju Ali as Peter Samuel
- Ashutosh Gowariker as Sammy
- Sulabha Arya as Mrs. Kamat
- Joy Augustine as Inspector Bandodkar
- Aghaa

== Soundtrack ==
#	Title	Singer(s)
1	"Sama Ye Suhana, Akele Tum Ho, Akele Hum Hai"	Hema Sardesai, Binjoo Ali
2	"Jawani Ke Din Hai Pyar Kiye Ja"	Abhijeet, Hema Sardesai, Binjoo Ali
3	"Jo Gunje Wohi Dil Ki Aawaz"	Manna Dey
4	"Suta Lagao Yaro, Lo Ek Dusre Ka Jhoota"	Binjoo Ali, Abhijeet
5	"Love Technology"	Electra, Biddu

== Awards and nominations ==
- Nominated for Filmfare Award for Best Story (1990)
