= Chintamani Tryambak Khanolkar =

Indian writer (1930–1976)

C. T. Khanolkar
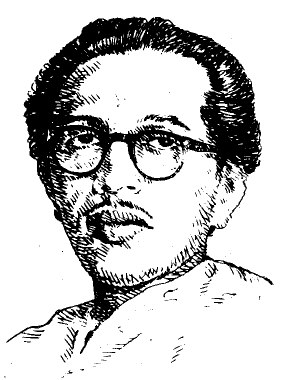
- Born: Chintamani Tryambak Khanolkar; 8 March 1930; Baglanchi Rai, Vengurla, Maharashtra
- Died: 26 April 1976 (aged 46)
- Writing career
- Notable work: Nakshatranche Dene
- Notable awards: Sangeet Natak Akademi Award (1976); Sahitya Akademi Award (1978)

Chintamani Tryambak Khanolkar (C. T. Khanolkar) (8 March 1930 – 26 April 1976) was a Marathi writer from Maharashtra, India. He wrote poetry under the name "Arati Prabhu" and prose under his own name. He received a Sangeet Natak Akademi Award in 1976 for his playwriting and a Sahitya Akademi Award in 1978 for his collection of poems Nakshatranche Dene.

== Early life ==
Khanolkar was born on 8 March 1930 in the village of Baglanchi Rai near Vengurla in Maharashtra into a family with meagre means. He started writing poetry in 1950 and received acclaim for his poem Shunya Shrungarte, which featured in the February edition of Marathi literary journal Satya Katha in 1954. Khanolkar completed his education up to matriculation and began running the family business of "Khanaval" (a small hotel). However, the business did not do well and Khanolkar decided to leave his village for Mumbai in search of livelihood in 1959.

== Initial years in Mumbai ==
Khanolkar was known in the Marathi literary circles even before his arrival in the city due to his poems. He managed to get a job in Mumbai Akashwani (State Radio) with the help of a fellow poet Mangesh Padgaonkar, but he had to give up his job in 1961 because of his eccentric behaviour. This made his initial years in Mumbai full of financial difficulties.

== Poetry ==
Jogva was his first published collection of poems, in 1959. After that, in 1962 he published Divelagan, another collection of poems. Both collections have a majority of poems which portray agitation and distress. Reminiscent agitation is the chief emotion in the initial collection of his poems. His poems do not feature romantic descriptions of a lover as do the poems of his contemporaries. His poems might begin with a description of the lover, but the intensity of hurt hits him with such force that the poem turns into an ode to the suffering.

Jarach firli kinkhabichi sui
Juicha usvit Shela
Ani Thanakla Gatasmruticha
Kalokhane Kapur Pela –

(The needle moved gently
Threading a cloth of Jui flowers
And the memories flooding in hurt
Darkness prevails -)

And so his hurt intensifies as the poem progresses.

Compared with these poems, his collection published in Nakshtrache Dene in 1975 are a great deal more pleasant; he appears to have overcome his suffering. These poems are conversational and theatrical.

One poem from this set is Aad Yete Reet:

Nahi Kashi Mhanu Tula Mhante re Geet
Pari Sare halkyane aad yete reet
Nahi kashi mhanu tula, yete jara thamb,
Pari hirvya valnanni jaiche na lamb

(How do I refuse you, I shall sing you a song
But need to do it discreetly as traditions stand in the way
How do I refuse you, wait I shall come to you,
But we shouldn't stray far along the green winding paths)

This poem describes the suggested romance between a husband and wife. The intensity of romance in these lines, despite the creative control in them is proof of his mature image.

Aarti Prabhu's poems give a feeling of a strong background of nature. Correct and perfect use of words is the hallmark of his poems based on nature. Several of Khanolkar's poems were put to music by famous music director Pt. Hridayanath Mangeshkar and have become some of the masterpieces of Marathi music. Some of these songs include "Gele Dyayache Rahuni", "Ye Re Ghana" and "Tu Tenvha Tashi".

== Novels ==
Khanolkar's first novel Ratra Kali Ghagar Kali was published in 1962, but it was Kondura, a novel published in 1966 brought him among the league of foremost novelists in Marathi. These were followed by other two masterpieces Trishanku (1968) and Ganuraya Ani Chani (1970). Khanolkar's stories had themes of complexity, non-debatable heavenly power, concepts of good versus evil, religious faith, desires that take mankind to any level, the finer as well as horrifying façade of nature, and the venomous disposition of mankind. Two of his novels have been made into films which include Anugraham (based on Kondura) in Telugu, Kondura in Hindi by Shyam Benegal featuring Anant Nag and Amrish Puri, and Chani (Hindi and Marathi) by V. Shantaram featuring Ranjana. A telefilm on his novel Ganuraya was made by Satyadev Dubey, featuring Chetan Datar as Ganuraya.

== Plays ==
Khanolkar carried out several experiments in Marathi Theatre. Khanolkar's play Ek Shunya Bajirao (एक शून्य बाजीराव) is considered a modern Marathi classic, unique in form and content. In this play Khanolkar attempted to harness the resources of Medieval Marathi dramatic forms. Khanolkar's play Ajab Nyay Wartulacha (अजब न्याय वर्तुळाचा) was an adaptation of Brecht's The Caucasian Chalk Circle.

== Works adapted ==
Ankahee, a Hindi film based on his play Kalay Tasmai Namaha, was made in 1985 by Amol Palekar. It featured Amol Palekar and Deepti Naval. Vijaya Mehta's production of Khanolkar play, Ek Shoonya Bajirao is considered a landmark in contemporary Indian theatre.

== Awards ==
Khanolkar received a Sangeet Nataka Academy Award in 1976 for his playwriting. His collection of poems Nakshatranche Dene posthumously received a Sahitya Akademi Award in 1978.

== List of literary work ==
=== Collections of poems ===
- Jogva (जोगवा) (1959)
- Divelagan (दिवेलागण) (1962)
- Nakshatranche Dene (नक्षत्रांचे देणे) (1975)

=== Collection of stories ===
- Sanai (सनई) (1964)
- Rakhi Pakharu (राखी पाखरू) (1971)
- Chapha Ani Dewachi Aai (चाफा आणि देवाची आई) (1975)

=== Novels ===
- Ratra Kali Ghagar Kali (रात्र काळी घागर काळी) (1962)
- Ajagar (अजगर) (1965)
- Kondura (कोंडुरा) (1966)
- Trishanku (त्रिशंकु) (1968)
- Ganuraya Ani Chani (गणुराय आणि चानी) (1970)
- Pishacch (पिशाच्च) (1970)
- Aganchar (अगंचर) (1970)
- Adnyat Kabutare (1970)
- Pashan Palawi (पाषाण पालवी) (1976)

=== Plays ===
- Ek Shunya Bajirao (एक शून्य बाजीराव) (1966)
- Sagesoyare (सगेसोयरे) (1967)
- Avadhya (अवध्य) (1972)
- Kalay Tasmai Namaha (कालाय तस्मै नमः) (1972)
- Ajab Nyay Wartulacha (अजब न्याय वर्तुळाचा) (1974)
- Guru Maharaj Guru (गुरु महाराज गुरु) — an unpublished play by Khanolkar, was presented by Rangayan on stage directed by Vijaya Mehta, with Shriram Lagoo as the lead actor.
