= Vartmaan =

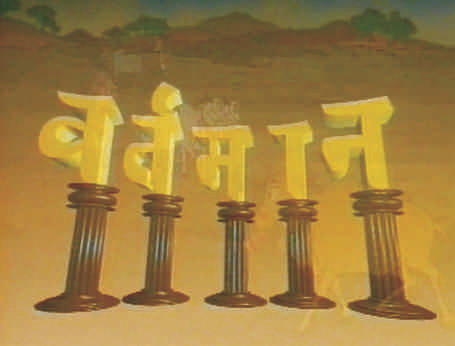
- Written by: Kireet Khurana
- Directed by: Bhimsain; Kireet Khurana
- Music by: Kersi Lord; Raghunath Seth
- No. of episodes: 26

Production
- Producer: Bhimsain
- Running time: 13 minutes
- Production company: Climb Media

Original release
- Network: DD National

Vartmaan is an animated television series aired on DD National during 1994–1995. It was directed and produced by Bhimsain along with animation director Kireet Khurana. This is one of the first Indian animated series produced using 3D animation

Vaartman aims to teach children moral lessons on how to control one's weaknesses. The leading character, Purush (translation: 'Man'), fights against the evil Sankat (translation: 'Trouble') and his own negative emotions, and ultimately wins over his present (Vartmaan). Several characters are animated in 3D. There are 26 episodes, each with a running time of 13 minutes. The production work for this animated series was done by Climb Media.

== Plot ==
The story follows Purush, as he tries to get back his lost kingdom, Vaartman (translation: 'Present'), from the antagonist, Sankat. Purush is an ordinary person attempting to conquer his weaknesses. Through his struggles, he experiences various emotional states that Sankat can take advantage of. Sankat uses Purush's negative emotions to create negative humanoid manifestations that conflict with Purush's willpower. Sometimes Purush's willpower is weakened as he listens to the negative emotions. To rescue him from these, his positive emotions emerge from within to aid him in his battle. These positive emotions give Purush the strength to face his obstacles. One day he hopes to defeat Sankat once and for all. As the series progresses, Purush encounters various manifestations from Sankat's negative humanoid army. It is still unknown how the story ends.

== Characters ==
=== Purush ===
Purush is the protagonist of the story. His struggles to achieve his goal show the challenges posed by negative emotions such as hate, greed, anger, jealousy, pride and sadness. Purush's willpower is tested continually throughout the series. Sometimes he succeeds in defeating Sankat's manifested negative humanoid army, whilst other times he fails and loses his self-confidence. Aided by the humanoid manifestations of his positive emotions, he fights his negative emotions and Sankat. Purush is meant to be a role-model for the audience.

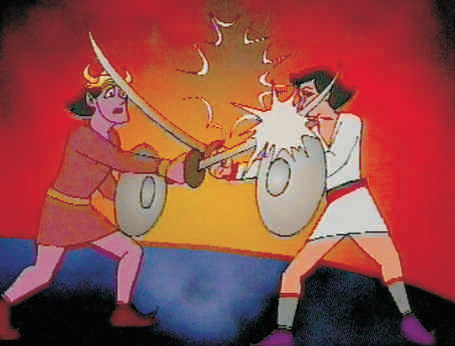
Purush in a fight

=== Sankat ===
Sankat is Purush's main antagonist. He has the ability to create negative humanoid forms of emotions and manipulate humans. He represents the negativity of all human emotions. His goal is to rule over Purush's kingdom for eternity. He is assisted by Kaloota (a crow) who always spies on Purush's activities. Sankat has the appearance of a supernatural being with horns on his head, his hands looking like scorpions. He is a 3D character with scorpion-like hand movements.

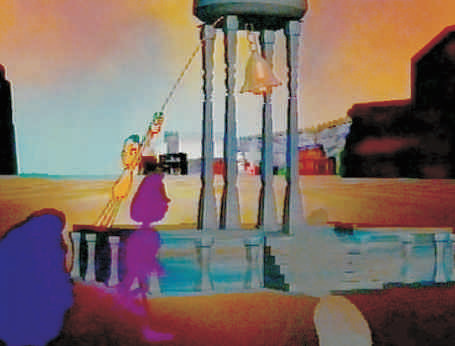
Chaos caused by Sankat

=== Friends of Purush ===
Some of the known names of Purush's friends are Vishwas (Self-Belief, also Purush's guru), Saahas (Courage), Gyan (Knowledge as a horse), Yukti( Strategy as a female head), Anand (Happiness), Doordershita (foresight दूरदर्शिता one with magnifying glass), Aasha (आशा hope), Atit (अतीत past) and many more positive humanoid manifestation of Purush's inner self.

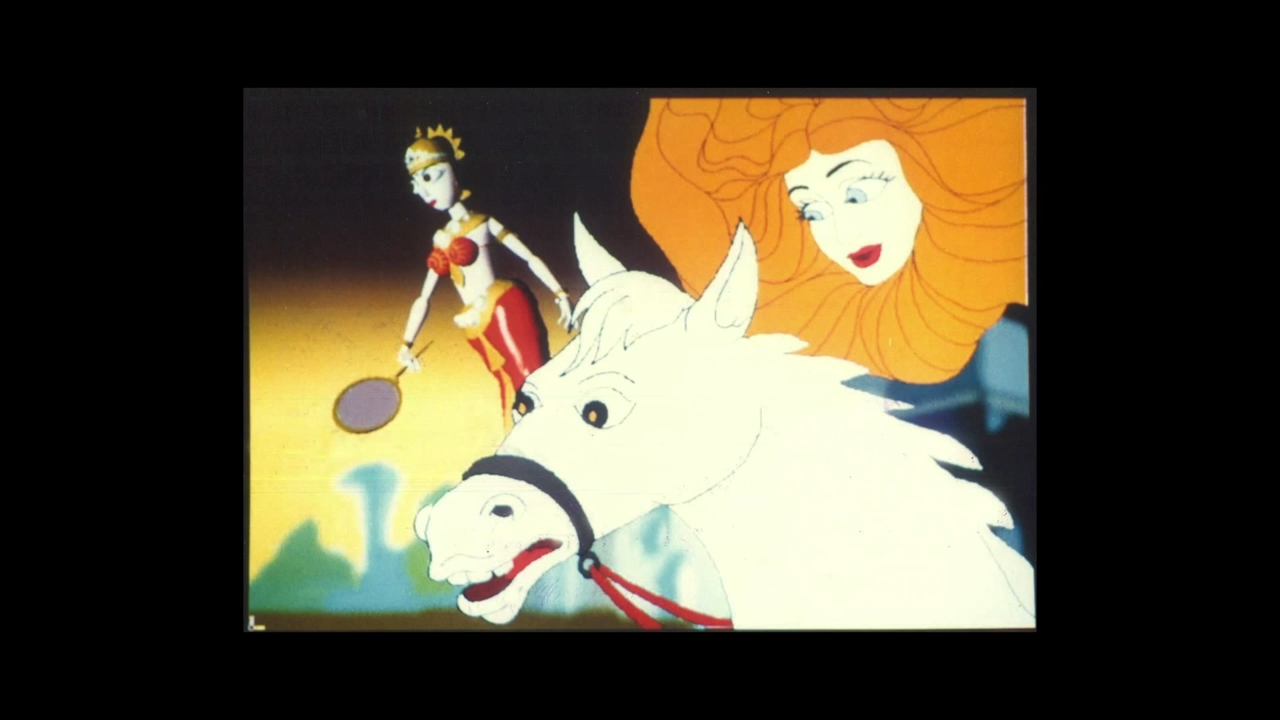
Purush's friends, a horse (Gyan), Yukti(a female head) and Doordershita (with the mirror).

=== Negative humanoids ===
Some of the forms manifested out of Sankat are Irsha(jealousy), Lobh(greed), Dukh (sadness), Ahankaar (Ego), Bhay (fear), Aalas(laziness), Krodh (क्रोध anger), Adchanay(अड़चनें obstacles) and many more. The army of negative humanoid emotions constantly attack Purush. The challenge for him is to seek help from his inner self in order to defeat the negative emotions.

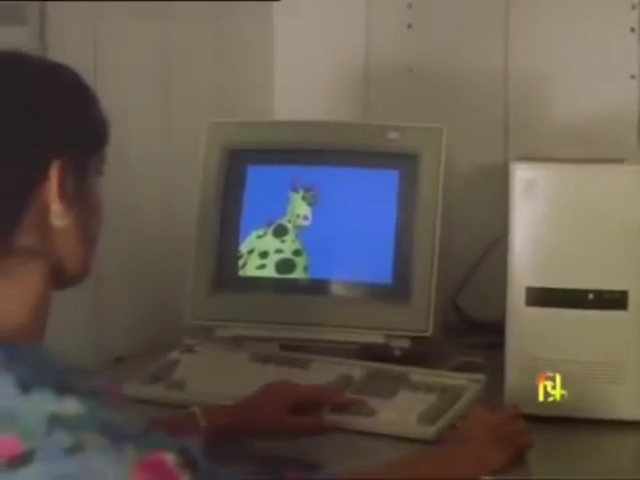
Creating 3D animated character Sankat

== Home media ==
DD Archives (currently known as Doordarshan Archives) had digitized Vartmaan series and released it on YouTube on the channel Prasar Bharati Archives.

== See also ==
- List of Indian animated television series
