= Mitali Mukherjee (singer) =

Mitali Mukherjee মিতালী মুখার্জী
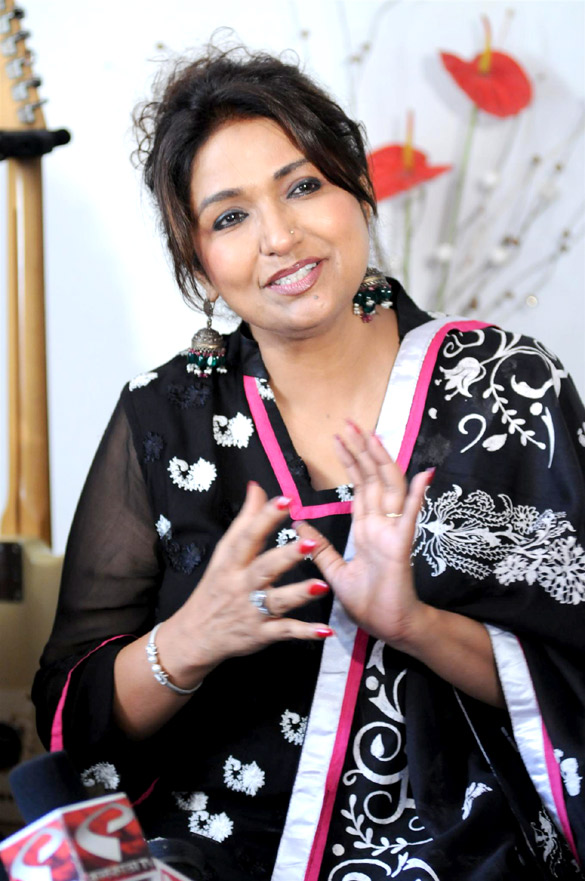
- Mukherjee in April 2012

Background information
- Born: 1962 (age 63–64); Mymensingh, Bangladesh
- Genres: Modern, classical, playback
- Occupations: Singer
- Instruments: Vocal
- Years active: 1978–present
- Spouse: Bhupinder Singh (m. 1980–2022)

Mitali Mukherjee is a Bangladeshi classical and playback singer, she hails from Mymensingh, Bangladesh. She received the National Film Award of Bangladesh in 1982 for the song Ei Dunia Ekhon To Ar for the film Dui Poishar Alta.

== Early life and education ==
Mukherjee was born in 1962 in Mymensingh to her parents Amulya Kumar Mukherjee and Kalyani Mukherjee. She began her formal training in classical music under Pt. Mithun Dey. She studied music at Maharaja Sayajirao University of Baroda.

== Career ==
Mukherjee's first album "Saahil" was released by HMV. She collaborated with lyricist Gulzar for her album "Chand Parosa Hai". She has sung in several languages, including Punjabi, Gujarati and Tamil.

Mukherjee served as the judge of the television shows Sa Re Ga Ma Pa and Shera Kontho.

== Songs list ==
=== Bengali songs ===
==== Film songs ====
Year	Film	Song	Composer(s)	Co-artist(s)	
1981	Matir Putul	"Tumi Chokkher Aral Hoile Amar"	Alam Khan	Abdul Hai Al Hadi	solo
1982	Dui Poishar Alta	"Ei Duniya Ekhon To Aar"	Alauddin Ali	solo	
1982	Sohag Milon	"Peyechhi Ami Tare"	Anwar Parvez	Gazi Mazharul Anwar	Syed Abdul Hadi
1983	Asha	"O Keno Eto Nithur Holo"	Alauddin Ali	Mohammad Moniruzzaman	solo
1993	Meyer Adhikar	"Tumi Biday Na Dile Pore"	Abu Taher	Mohammad Rafiquzzaman	Tapan Chowdhury
1993	Meyer Adhikar	"Bhalobasha Jiboner Arekti Naam"	Abu Taher	Mohammad Rafiquzzaman	Tapan Chowdhury
1999	Modhur Milon	"Baar Baar Shotobaar"	Alauddin Ali		Khalid Hasan Milu
1999	Modhur Milon	"Eto Prem Diyo Na"	Alauddin Ali		Khalid Hasan Milu
2005	Phuler Moto Bou	"Amake Chhara Aar Kauke"	Emon Saha	Gazi Mazharul Anwar	solo

==== Non-film songs ====
Year	Film	Song	Composer(s)	Co-artist(s)	
1997	Ogo Ruposhi	"Phiriye Dao"	Bhushan Kumar	solo	
N/A	Praner Majhe Tumi	"Protidin Bhor Hoy"	Mannan Mohammad	Delowar Arjuda Sharaf	Andrew Kishore
N/A	Praner Majhe Tumi	"Tumi Jodi Chand Hou"	Mannan Mohammad	Delowar Arjuda Sharaf	Andrew Kishore
N/A	Praner Majhe Tumi	"Nirapod Aashroy"	Mannan Mohammad	Delowar Arjuda Sharaf	Andrew Kishore
N/A	Praner Majhe Tumi	"Uttor Dike Jaite Nana"	Mannan Mohammad	Delowar Arjuda Sharaf	Andrew Kishore
N/A	Praner Majhe Tumi	"Mon Bagane"	Mannan Mohammad	Delowar Arjuda Sharaf	Andrew Kishore
N/A	Praner Majhe Tumi	"Ghum Asena Chokhe"	Mannan Mohammad	Delowar Arjuda Sharaf	solo
N/A	Praner Majhe Tumi	"Ami Preme Pora"	Mannan Mohammad	Delowar Arjuda Sharaf	solo
N/A	Praner Majhe Tumi	"Je Mukh Dekhe Dekhe"	Mannan Mohammad	Delowar Arjuda Sharaf	solo

=== Tamil songs ===
1. Yamunai Aatrile from Movie “Thalapati “ by Illayaraja

=== Punjabi songs ===
Album: Woh Bura Maan Gaye Song: Saajan Mujhse Roothe

== Personal life ==
Mukherjee was married to Ghazal singer Bhupinder Singh since 1983. She resides in Mumbai. They have two son named Nihal Singh and another son named Amandeep Singh. Her siblings are Pradip Mukherjee and Deepak Mukherjee (d. 1988).

== Awards ==
- "Gaan-e Gaan-e Gunijon Shongbordhona" by Citibank (2015)
