= Shanker Shesh =

Indian playwright (1933-1981)

Dr. Shanker Shesh
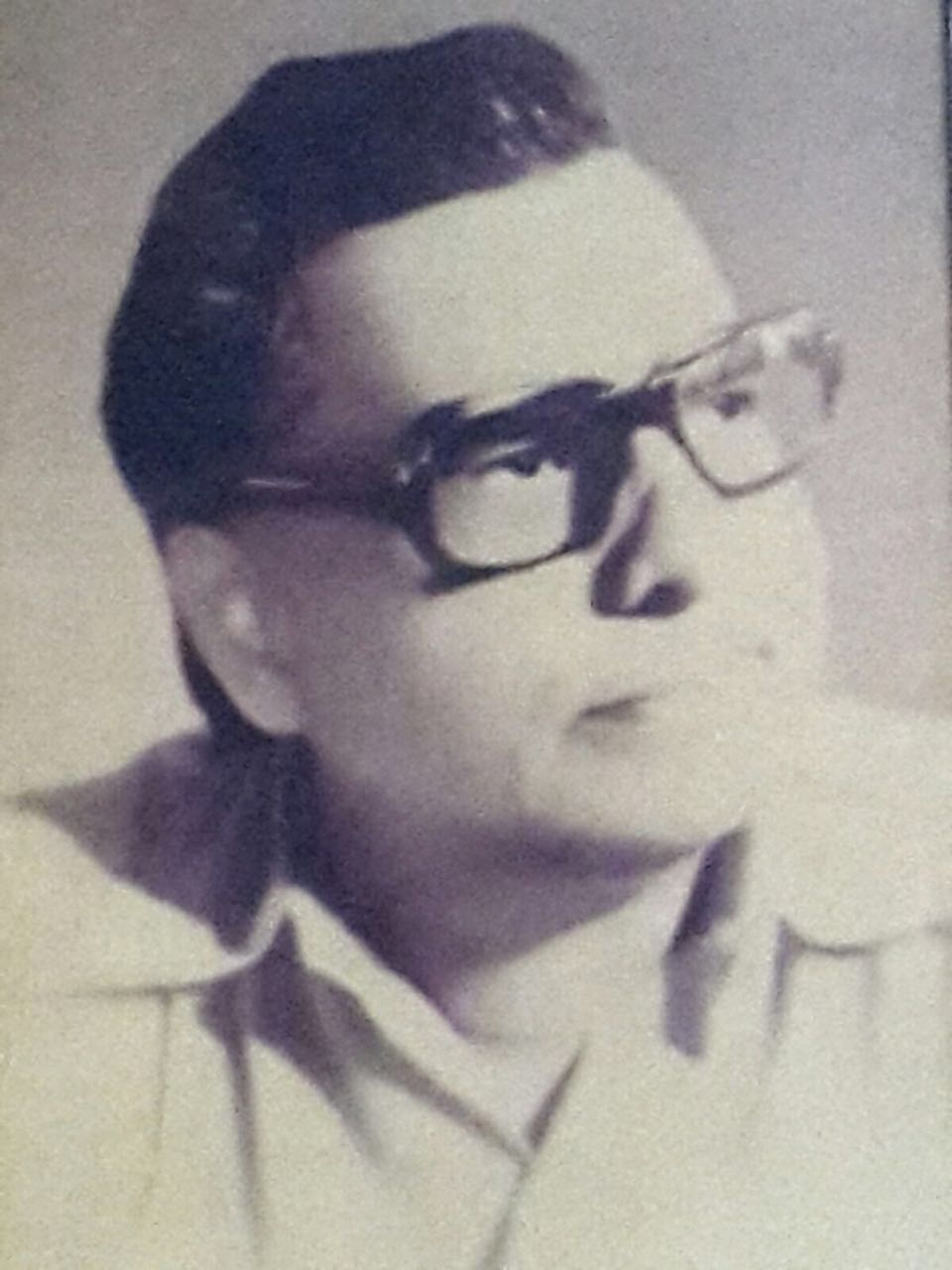
- Shanker Shesh
- Born: 2 October 1933; Bilaspur, Chhattisgarh, British India
- Died: 28 October 1981 (aged 48); Srinagar, Jammu & Kashmir, India
- Education: Nagpur University
- Occupations: Playwright; author; story writer; poet
- Writing career
- Years active: 1956-1981
- Notable awards: Filmfare Award for Best Story; Aashirwaad Award

Shanker Shesh was an Indian playwright, author, poet and story writer.

== Biography ==
Shanker was born on 2 October 1933 in Bilaspur, Central Provinces and Berar, British India. He did his higher education in Nagpur and Mumbai. He got his Ph.D. from Nagpur University in 1964.

Shesh was associated with theatre from 1956 and remained associated throughout his life. While being appointed as the Chief Hindi Officer of State Bank of India in Mumbai, he continued to do playwriting and other creative work. He was also fluent in Marathi Language and also translated some marathi plays in hindi.

Shesh died on 28 October 1981 in Srinagar, Jammu & Kashmir.

== Work ==
=== Films ===
Year	Film	Notes	Ref(s)
1977	Gharonda	Nominated- Filmfare Award for Best Story	
1979	Dooriyaan	Won- Filmfare Award for Best Story	
2020	Sragaal		

=== Plays ===
Play	Ref(s)
Dard Ka Ilaaj	
Afsarnama	
Pratiksha	
Panchatantra	
Puliya	
Chal Mere Kaddu Dummak Dummak	
Bin Baati Ke Deep	
Fandhi	
Rakhtbeej	
Bandhan Apne Apne	
Ek Aur Dronacharya	
Are! Mayavi Sarovar	
Komal Gandhar	
Chehre	
Poster	
Kajhuraho Ka Shipli	
Badh Ka Paani: Chandan Ke Dweep	
Gharoanda	
Ratangrabha	
Raakshas	
Nayi Sabhyata: Naye Namune	
Aadhi Raat Ke Baad	
Chetna	
Dharam Kurukshetra	
Ek Saath Ke Gaatha	
Murthikaar	
Til Ka Tadh	
Kaaljayi	

== Awards and honors ==
Year	Award	Category	Work	Result	Ref(s)
1978	Filmfare Award	Best Story	Gharaonda	Nominated	
1980	Filmfare Award	Best Story	Dooriyaan	Won	

Shesh was honored with the Aashirwaad Award by the government of Madhya Pradesh for his plays Gharaonda and Dooriyaan.
