= The Storyteller (2022 film) =

- Release poster
- Directed by: Ananth Mahadevan
- Written by: Kireet Khurana
- Based on: Golpo Boliye Tarini Khuro by Satyajit Ray
- Produced by: Jyoti Deshpande; Suchhanda Chatterjee; Salil Chaturvedi; Shubha Shetty
- Starring: Paresh Rawal; Adil Hussain
- Cinematography: Alphonse Roy
- Edited by: Gourav Gopal Jha
- Music by: Hriju Roy
- Production companies: Jio Studios; Purpose Entertainment; Quest Films
- Distributed by: Disney+ Hotstar
- Release dates: 8 October 2022 (Busan); 21 November 2022 (Goa); 28 January 2025 (Disney+ Hotstar)
- Running time: 116 minutes
- Country: India
- Language: Hindi

The Storyteller is a 2022 Indian Hindi-language drama film directed by Ananth Mahadevan and written by filmmaker Kireet Khurana. Produced under Jio Studios A Purpose Entertainment, and Quest Films. It is based on Satyajit Ray's short story "Golpo Boliye Tarini Khuro" the film stars Paresh Rawal and Adil Hussain. The film premiered at the 27th Busan International Film Festival in October 2022 and was released on 28 January 2025 on Disney+ Hotstar.

== Plot ==
Tarini Bandyopadhyay, a 60-something Bengali man who loves fish and dislikes capitalism, has held 73 jobs and is passionate about storytelling. He accepts a job in Ahmedabad as a personal storyteller for Ratan Garodia, a wealthy Gujarati businessman suffering from insomnia.

Ratan, who claims he hasn't slept in three decades, hopes that comforting bedtime tales will cure his insomnia. Garodia wants unique stories to help him sleep and offers Tarini a substantial amount for his unpublished works. Tarini moves to Ahmedabad to become Ratan's storyteller. Each night, Tarini crafts spontaneous, amusing stories to lull Ratan to sleep. During the day, Tarini explores fish markets and libraries, where he meets Suzie Fibert, a spirited librarian with whom he bonds over their shared love for books.

Ratan, realizing Tarini isn't interested in publishing, publishes Tarini's stories under the pen name Gorkhe, gaining recognition within intellectual circles and rekindling a past romance with a widow who values literary talent. Tarini discovers the theft when he sees a magazine with his stories published under the name Gorkhe but continues to work for Garodia. During a story release event, authorities from the Rabindranath Tagore Foundation reveal that Garodia has been copying Tagore's work, leading to a lawsuit and a fine of Rs. 10 lakh. Tarini reveals he tricked Garodia by narrating Tagore's stories, which Garodia mistook for Tarini's original work due to his lack of knowledge of literature.

The film concludes with Tarini writing his own story about meeting Garodia, using the pen gifted to him by his late wife, while Garodia also starts writing about Tarini, both discovering their true selves.

== Cast ==
- Paresh Rawal as Tarini Bandyopadhyay
- Adil Hussain as Ratan Garodia
- Revathi as Saraswati
- Tannishtha Chatterjee as Suzie Fibert
- Anindita Bose
- Jayesh More as Manik
- Rohit Mukherjee
- Pratik Dutta

== Reception ==
Saibal Chatterjee of NDTV rated 3/5 stars and said that "Rawal and Hussain bring great solidity to the table, and not that there is nothing else in The Storyteller to pique our interest. There is plenty." Shubhra Gupta of The Indian Express gave 3 stars out of 5 and said that "Even though the casting of the Gujju-in-real-life Paresh Rawal as the intellectual Bengali, and Adil Hussain as the sheep-counting-to-no-avail businessman, feels counter-intuitive, the actors are consummate enough to carry it off." Dhaval Roy of The Times of India also gave it 3 stars out of 5 and said, "The film brims with wit, the charming yet somnolent vibes of Kolkata and Ahmedabad, and strong performances. While its leisurely pace and some story elements may not fully engage all viewers, the film's unexpected twist and strong character portrayals make it a worthwhile watch, ensuring that the tale resonates long after the credits roll." Vineeta Kumar of India Today rated 3.5/5 stars and said, "The Storyteller is what quality storytelling looks like, in the glory of its quaintness and innocence. You feel rich and fulfilled by the end of it" Arpita Sarkar of OTTplay observed that Paresh Rawal and Adil Hussain excel in the film based on Satyajit Ray's classic short story, Golpo Boliye Tarini Khuro." Udita Jhunjhunwala of Mint observed that "The relaxed narrative pace is a blip in an otherwise satisfying retelling of a classic fable that is equally about outwitting another and surmounting self-imposed impediments." Troy Ribeiro of The Free Press Journal said that "The film is an earnest, well-intentioned homage to Ray, storytelling, and the art of listening. Like Tarini's tales, it meanders, digresses, and occasionally dazzles." Rishabh Suri of Hindustan Times observed that "The Storyteller is a must watch- it's a pause in time, a departure from the mundane, pacy lives we lead. Something as simple as a man who loves to tell stories- and what happens to his stories- becomes a story in itself."
