= Jalal Agha =

Indian actor and film director (1945–1995)

- Born: 11 July 1945; Bombay, Bombay Province, British India
- Died: 5 March 1995 (aged 49); New Delhi, India
- Occupation: Actor
- Years active: 1960–1993
- Relatives: Agha (Father), Tinnu Anand (Brother-in-law)

Jalal Agha (11 July 1945 – 5 March 1995) was an Indian actor and director in Bollywood films. He was the son of the popular comedian actor Agha. Jalal studied acting at the Film and Television Institute of India, Pune.

== Career ==
He made his debut as a child actor played the role of young Jehangir in all-time-hit 1960 film Mughal-E-Azam (role was played by Dilip Kumar as an adult). He made his debut of an adult role in K.A. Abbas's Bambai Raat Ki Bahon Mein (1967), and went on to appear in over 60 Bollywood films from the late 1960s through to the early 1990s, mostly playing supporting roles. His most famous role was in the blockbuster hit Sholay, where he played the Rubab player in the popular song Mehbooba O' Mehbooba. His other roles to mention are Julie (Julie's silent lover), the played the role of singer in Sama Hai Suhana Suhana from the film Ghar Ghar Ki Kahani, Shabana Azmi's brother in Thodi Si Bewafai, Amol Palekar's friend and roommate in Gharonda and Naseeruddin Shah's friend in Dil Akhir Dil Hai. He played a prominent role in Saat Hindustani.

He also made appearances in English-language films such as Bombay Talkie (1970), Gandhi (1982), Kim (1984) and The Deceivers (1988). He wrote and directed a Bollywood film titled Goonj, which was released in 1989.

His last film appearance was in the 1998 film Badmaash.

== Personal life and death ==
He died of a heart attack on 5 March 1995 at the age of 49. Married to model Valerie Pereira (divorced July 1982). They had two children Saleem Christopher Agha Bee (of Goa's Sublime bistro fame) and Vanessa Bee Feuerstein.

== Selected filmography ==
Year	Series	Role	Notes
1960	Mughal E Azam	Young Jehangir	Child artist
1967	Taqdeer	Suresh	
1967	Majhli Didi	Kamal	
1967	Bambai Raat Ki Bahon Mein	Johnny / Joseph	
1969	Sara Akash	Diwakar	
1969	Aya Sawan Jhoom Ke	Deepak	
1969	Saat Hindustani	Shakram Shinde	
1970	Bombay Talkie	Young Man	
1970	Ghar Ghar Ki Kahani	College student	
1971	Aisa Bhi Hota Hai		
1971	Lakhon Mein Ek	Jeevan	
1971	Kathputli	Murli	
1971	Hum Tum Aur Woh	Charan Das	
1971	Do Boond Pani	Ganga Singh	
1972	Gomti Ke Kinare	Dhobi	
1972	Zindagi Zindagi	Ratan	
1972	Man Jaiye	Ashok	
1972	Do Chor	Badhru	
1973	Mere Gharib Nawaz	Yusuf's friend	
1973	Yaadon Ki Baraat	Salim	
1973	Honeymoon		
1974	Garam Hawa	Shamshad	
1974	Jab Andhera Hota Hai	Ramesh	
1974	Call Girl		
1974	Us Paar	Bhairo	
1974	Shikwa		
1974	Jeevan Sangram		
1974	Do Nambar Ke Amir		
1974	Anjaan Raahen	Rakesh Kapoor	
1974	Ang Se Ang Lagaley	Drunkard	
1975	Mrig Trishna		
1975	Julie	Richard	
1975	Sholay	Banjo Player in the song "Mehbooba O' Mehbooba"	
1975	Badnaam	Suresh	
1976	Khemro Lodan		
1976	Aaj Ka Ye Ghar	Nutan Chandra	
1977	Taxi Taxie	RV	
1977	Shankar Hussain		
1977	Saheb Bahadur	Judge	
1977	Gharaonda	Abdul	
1977	Adha Din Adhi Raat	Raju	
1977	Hum Kisise Kum Naheen		
1978	Hamara Sansar	Bhimsen	
1978	Gaman	Lalulal	
1978	Ghata	Suresh	
1979	Shyamla		
1979	Junoon	Kader Khan	
1979	Nauker	Jaggu	
1979	Dooriyaan	News Paper Vendor	
1979	Deen Aur Imaan		
1980	Dam Maro Dam		
1980	Takkar (1980 film)		
1980	Thodisi Bewafai	Narendra Deshmukh	
1980	Man Pasand		
1980	Karz	Dr. Dayal	
1980	Kismet		
1980	The Naxalites		
1980	Bambai Ka Maharaja		
1981	Khuda Kasam	Pancham	
1981	Be-Shaque	Mishra	
1981	Woh Phir Nahin Aaye		
1981	Rocky	Himself	
1982	Hum Paagal Premee		
1982	Chorni	Kishore Sinha	
1982	Vakil Babu	Anil Kumar Shrivastav	
1982	Dil... Akhir Dil Hai	Fazal Mohammad	
1982	Teri Maang Sitaron Se Bhar Doon	Sheriff Dilip Kumar	
1982	Gandhi	Traveller on Train roof #2	
1983	Haadsa	Lorry Driver	
1983	Katha	Himself	
1983	Naukar Biwi Ka	Chowkidar	
1984	Aakhir		
1984	Baazi	Albert	
1984	Kim	Rajah of Bunar	
1984	Yeh Ishq Nahin Aasaan	Qawaal	Uncredited role
1984	Tarang	Russi	
1984	Bandh Honth		
1985	Ram Tere Kitne Nam		
1986	Anadi Khiladi		
1986	Baat Ban Jaye	Advocate Bharat Sinha	
1987	Itihaas	Public Prosecutor	
1988	The Deceivers	The Nawab	
1988	Bharat Ek Khoj	Robert Clive (in Episode 37)	Episodic role
1989	Goonj	Napoleon Bonaparte Gonsalves	
1989	Do Qaidi		
1992	Jatt Walaity	Raj / Tiger	Punjabi film
1993	Pehla Nasha	Mahesh Ahuja	
1995	Jhumka		
1995	Rock Dancer	Waiter in the restaurant	
1995	Policewala Gunda		
1998	Badmaash		
2008	Yaar Meri Zindagi	Shankar	Posthumous release
