= Suresh Eriyat =

Indian animator

- Occupations: Animator; film director
- Notable work: Tokri; Fisherwoman and Tuk-Tuk kandittund(seen it); Fateline
- Spouse: Nilima Eriyat

Suresh Eriyat, popularly known as E. Suresh, is an Indian animator, director, businessperson and founder of his animation studio Studio Eeksaurus. His film Tokri won National Film Award for Best Non-Feature Animation Film.

He started his animation career with Famous House of Animation. He was the first to launch clay animation commercials in India. He created Amaron battery advertisements, music video Bindu re Bindu, the Simpu series for Channel V, MTV Poga series, Johnny Bravo Goes to Bollywood, Levis Slim vs. Slim, Google Tanjore paintings and many more things.
