= Ankahee (1985 film) =

1985 Hindi film

- Theatrical release poster Theatrical release poster
- Directed by: Amol Palekar
- Screenplay by: Kamlesh Pandey
- Based on: Kalay Tasmai Namaha by C. T. Khanolkar
- Produced by: Amol Palekar; Jayant Dharmadhikari
- Starring: Amol Palekar; Deepti Naval; Shreeram Lagoo; Vinod Mehra
- Music by: Jaidev
- Release date: 1985
- Running time: 129 Mins
- Country: India
- Language: Hindi

Ankahee (English: Unspoken) is a 1985 Indian drama film directed by Amol Palekar starring himself, Deepti Naval, and Shreeram Lagoo in key roles. It was based on the Marathi play Kalay Tasmai Namaha by C. T. Khanolkar. Its soundtrack won two awards at the 32nd National Film Awards, including Best Music Direction for Jaidev and Best Male Playback Singer for noted classical singer Bhimsen Joshi. Asha Bhosle also sang two songs, "Kauno Thagwa Nagariya" & "Mujhe Bhi Radha Bana De Nandlal". Amol Palekar's next film in the dual role of actor-director was Samaantar (2009).

== Plot ==
Well known astrologer Jyotibhaskar Pandit Satyanarayan Chaturvedi or 'Narayan' wishes good luck to a doctor, who is about to perform surgery on a woman, but also tells him that the patient will not survive. The doctor, a non-believer in Astrology, scoffs at this, and proceeds to the operation theatre. However, just as Narayan had predicted, the patient dies. The doctor questions Narayan that if he cannot change anybody's future, what is the use of sharing any such information with them?

Narayan lives with his wife, Devaki, and their son, Devkinandan or 'Nandu'. Nandu brings his girlfriend, Sushma, to his home to meet his parents and confirm their wedding. Narayan is hesitant to agree to this relation and reveals that Nandu is destined to marry twice in his lifetime, with his first wife dying within eleven months of their marriage during childbirth. Sushma does not believe in this prophecy but Nandu tells her that his father's prophecies have never been proven wrong.

Meanwhile, Narayan's childhood friend, Babu Mishra, comes to Mumbai from Lucknow for the treatment of his daughter, Indumati or 'Indu', and stays with the Chaturvedi family. Indu has a developmental disability. Both Indu and Babu are great artists of classical music. Indu's doctor tells Babu and Nandu that her disability is not very serious. Once she gets married and maintains physical relations with her husband, she will start acting mature.

To circumnavigate his father's prophecy, Nandu considers marrying Indu, making her a bait for the first wife's death curse, and then marry Sushma after Indu's death. He proposes this idea to Sushma who flatly refuses. When Sushma leaves Mumbai for a few days, Nandu decides to marry Indu. Babu is elated at this proposal as he is unaware of the prophecy. Nandu's parents, however, are distraught.

At the night of their wedding, Nandu is hesitant to get physical with Indu. He instead turns to a drinking habit. After two months, he decides to consummate his marriage and Indu gets pregnant. Later, Nandu reveals the truth about the prophecy to Indu and requests Indu to falsify his father's prophecy by delivering a child healthily. Indu accepts it strongly and says that even if she dies, she is happy to be given a happy life for these eleven months. She visits Sushma to tell her that she expects her to take care of the baby after her death.

Indu enters labour and delivers a baby boy. She survives the operation. At the same moment, Nandu receives a letter from Sushma which is her suicide note. She declares that she has committed suicide on her own terms as an escape from unwanted bonds of relations. Her dead body is brought into the same hospital and Narayan and Nandu stare at her dead body helplessly.

== Cast ==
Actor	Role	Other
Amol Palekar	Devkinandan Chaturvedi 'Nandu'	
Deepti Naval	Indumati Mishra 'Indu'	
Shriram Lagoo	Jyotibhaskar Pandit Satyanarayan Chaturvedi	Nandu's Father
Dina Pathak	Devaki Chaturvedi	Nandu's Mother
Anil Chatterjee	Babu Mishra	Indu's Father
Devika Mukherjee	Sushma Chatopadhyay	Nandu's Love interest
Vinod Mehra	Doctor	In opening scene
Vidhu Vinod Chopra	Patwardhan	Nandu's Cousin
Vidula	Seema	Patwardhan's Wife
Anant Bhave	Psychiatric Doctor	

== Soundtrack ==
All the songs in the soundtrack are composed by Jaidev which feature semi-classical and devotional songs.

Song title	Playback Singer	Notes
Raghuvar Tumko Meri Laaj	Pt. Bhimsen Joshi	Original lyrics by Tulsidas
Thumak Thumak Pag Dumak Kunj Madhu	Pt. Bhimsen Joshi	
Mujhko Bhi Radha Bana Le Nandlal	Asha Bhosle	
Kauno Nagariya Lootal Ho Thagwa	Asha Bhosle	

== Awards ==
- 32nd National Film Award
  - Best Music Direction: Jaidev
  - National Film Award for Best Male Playback Singer: Bhimsen Joshi: Thumak Thumak
- 1985: Filmfare Award
  - Best Story: C. T. Khanolkar: Nominated
