= Antisuperstition =

Antisuperstition is a concept in Chinese religion that can be defined as to body of all discussion against religious practice when using the word mixin, distinctly mixin/zongjiao.

Antisuperstition is similar to some extreme forms of Confucian fundamentalism, rejecting the moral self-perfection delineated by any particular world religion's theological scriptures.
