= Kinara (film) =

- Theatrical release poster
- Directed by: Gulzar
- Written by: Gulzar
- Produced by: Pranlal Mehta
- Starring: Jeetendra; Hema Malini; Dharmendra
- Music by: R. D. Burman
- Production company: Meghana Movies
- Release date: 21 March 1977
- Running time: 139 minutes
- Country: India
- Language: Hindi

Kinara (transl. Verge) is a 1977 Indian Hindi-language romantic drama film, produced and directed by Gulzar under the Meghana Movies banner. It stars Jeetendra, Hema Malini and Dharmendra in a special appearance with music composed by R. D. Burman. Much of the film was shot in Mandu, an ancient fort city in Madhya Pradesh.

== Plot ==
Inder is a well-off person working along with his uncle as an architect. His uncle is a fan of famous dancer Aarti Sanyal. While playing snooker against his uncle, Inder loses the game, and his uncle asks him to join him at Aarti Sanyal's concert. On the way to the concert, Inder meets with a near-fatal accident.

One day, his uncle suggests to him to go to Mandu to see the architectural beauty there. He meets a woman there and learns soon that she is the famous dancer Aarti Sanyal. She tells him that she has quit dancing for six months, and her grandfather tells him that it is because of an incident that shook her life. Soon, they become more friendly, and she tells him about her love, Chandan, who calls her Tikoo with love. Her only dream is to publish a historical book written by Chandan. She tells him that six months ago, Chandan died in a car accident on the way to her concert. Inder is surprised by this revelation and asks her where the accident occurred. He realizes that it was his accident in which the person in the oncoming vehicle died. Upset, he calls up his uncle and asks him why this was withheld from him. As his stay in Mandu continues, Aarti cries, remembering her past. Inder cannot hold it further and tells her that he was in the accident in which her lover Chandan had died. She becomes distraught. She tries to snatch Chandan's book from his hand, saying she needs no sympathy from him. In the confusion of trying to take the book, she falls down the stairs and sustains injuries. He tries to meet her, but her grandfather tells him that she hates even to hear his name, and they leave in the wee hours of the morning.

He returns to his home, where his uncle advises him to leave her alone if only because of sympathy for her. But if he has fallen in love with her, he should try to win her. Inder explains to his uncle that he went to her grandfather's house (the address given in the hotel register at Mandu), but no one was there. His uncle asks his secretary to call clinics to find out if any lady has come for treatment. They finally find the clinic where Aarti is. Inder goes there where she has undergone eye surgery. The doctor removes the eye bandage, but Aarti loses her eyesight. Inder talks to her mother, and she asks her mother if it is Inder. The doctor lies and tells her that it is his friend Prakash.

Inder, as Prakash, regularly to her home and supports her. He takes her to church to pray and helps her regain her dancing skills. He arranges for her show to be performed, and he supports her during her dance. She uses the money that she earned from the concert to try to publish Chandan's book. She gives the book to a publisher, finding it empty. The publisher tells her that the book she has given him is empty. She goes home, where Inder comes and tells her that he has a surprise for her. She asks him whether it is Chandan's book, as only Inder knew about Chandan's death anniversary, and Prakash wouldn't know about it. She tells him that he snatched everything from her. Chandan, her eyesight, and her only dream of publishing Chandan's book. She tells him to leave. As days pass, Aarti realizes she is still stuck in her past. She goes to the same church with her grandfather, where she meets Inder again. She asks for his forgiveness and explains to him that she always tried to live in her past. She tells him that she never realized how much Inder has been an essential part of her life. Both Inder and Aarti unite.

== Cast ==
- Jeetendra as Inderjeet "Inder" / Prakash
- Hema Malini as Aarti Sanyal
- Dharmendra as Professor Chandan Arya (Cameo)
- Shreeram Lagoo as Architect
- Om Shivpuri as Aarti's Grandfather
- Dina Pathak as Aarti's Mother

== Soundtrack ==
The songs of this album were composed by R. D. Burman.

#	Title	Singer(s)	Raga
1	"Jaane Kya Sochkar"	Kishore Kumar	
2	"Ek Hi Khwab"	Bhupinder, Hema Malini	
3	"Meete Bol Bole"	Lata Mangeshkar, Bhupinder	
4	"Koi Nahi Hai Kahin"	Bhupinder	
5	"Abke Na Sawan Barse"	Lata Mangeshkar	
6	"Naam Gum Jayega"	Lata Mangeshkar, Bhupinder	Yaman Kalyan

== Box office ==
Kinara was well received by the masses as well as the critics.

== Awards ==
25th Filmfare Awards:

Nominated

- Best Director – Gulzar
- Best Actress – Hema Malini
- Best Supporting Actor – Shriram Lagoo
- Best Music Director – R. D. Burman
- Best Lyricist – Gulzar for "Naam Gum Jaayega"
- Best Story – Bhusan Bangali
