= Bhimsain =

Indian animator

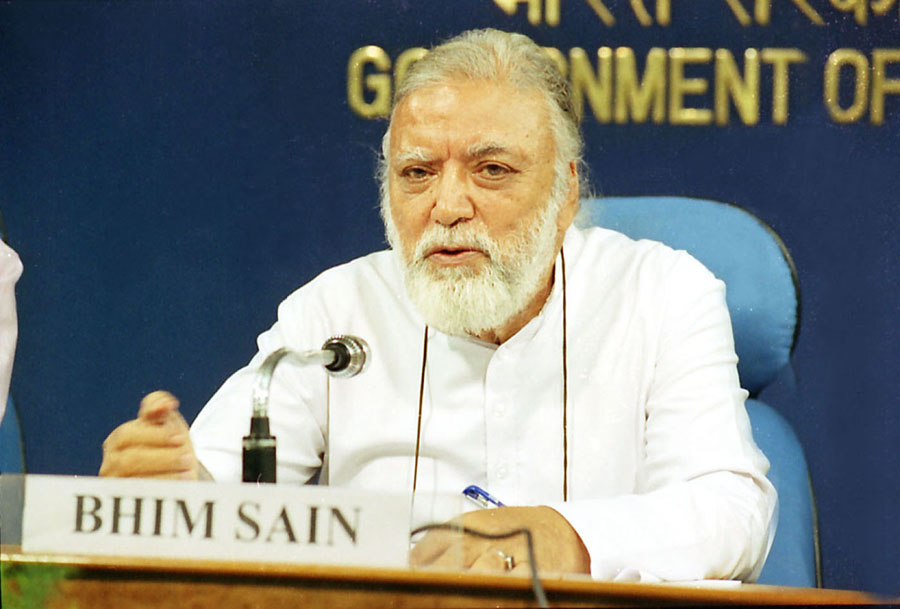
- Bhimsain in 2004
- Born: November 24, 1936; Multan, Punjab, British India (now in Punjab, Pakistan)
- Died: April 17, 2018 (aged 81); Mumbai, Maharashtra, India
- Education: Lucknow College of Arts and Crafts
- Occupations: Film director, producer, animator
- Children: Himanshu Khurana and Kireet Khurana

Bhimsain (born Bhimsain Khurana; November 24, 1936 – April 17, 2018) was an Indian film director, producer, screenwriter and animator. He is best known as the Father of Indian Animation, along with his mentor Ram Mohan. He was the recipient of 16 President's National Awards for his contributions to Indian cinema.

He is best known for directing the critically acclaimed Gharaonda (1977) starring Amol Palekar and Zarina Wahab, and Dooriyaan (1979) starring Sharmila Tagore and Uttam Kumar. He is also known for creating the animation short film Ek Anek Aur Ekta (1974) which aired on Doordarshan in the 70s. Bhimsain has also directed India's largest animation series Vartmaan (1994).

== Early life ==
Born in Multan (now in Pakistan) in 1936, Bhimsain moved to Lucknow after the partition. Belonging to family of artists, he gravitated to arts and music early, studying fine arts and learning classical music at the Lucknow College of Arts and Crafts which held him in good stead throughout his life. In 1961, Bhimsain moved to Mumbai after he secured a job at the Films Division of India as background painter. It is here that he learned the art and craft of animation filmmaking, under the mentorship of Ram Mohan.

== Career ==
Bhimsain made his debut with the animation short The Climb (1970) which earned him the Silver Hugo Award at the Chicago International Film Festival.

Soon after, he directed and produced several animation and ad films. He further established his repute as a director and producer with his landmark animation short Ek Anek Aur Ekta (1974). This film got him another National Film Award in the same year and has had over 500 screening on Doordarshan.

In 1976, Bhimsain produced and directed his first feature film Gharaonda (1977). It was written by Academy Award-winner Gulzar and starred Amol Palekar and Zarina Wahab. It received more than 30 awards including 5 Filmfare awards. This was followed by two other feature films, of which Doooriyan received an additional Filmfare award.

In 1985, Bhimsain ventured in television production with the sitcom Chhoti Badi Baatein (1986) based on superstitions. During the same period he also made several documentaries like Der Aaye Durust Aaye, Shaadi Shaadi, Jeevan Rahasya, Setu and Roshni. His documentary Kathni Karni Ek si fetched him two National Film Awards in 1990.

In 1991, he created India's first computer aided animation series Lok Gatha based on folk tales. This series received 3 National awards. Apart from this he also made India's largest animation project till date in the form of a 26-episode series Vartmaan aired on Doordarshan.

== Personal ==
He is father of filmmaker's Himanshu and Kireet Khurana, and grandfather of Kabeer, Niv and Mohak Khurana.

== Filmography ==
=== As director ===
- Orchestra (Short) (2001)
- The Prince and the Magician (Short) (1998)
- Locked (Short) (1997)
- Common Man (TV Movie) (1997)
- Vartmaan (TV Series) (1994)
- Lok Gatha (TV Series) (1992)
- Kathni Karni Eksi (Documentary) (1989)
- Roshni (Documentary) (1988)
- Setu (Documentary) (1987)
- Chhoti Badi Baatein (TV Series) (1986)
- Tum Laut Aao (1983)
- Jivan Rahasya (1982)
- Shaadi Shaadi (1982)
- Der Aaye Durust Aaye (1981)
- Dooriyaan (1979)
- Gharaonda (1977)
- Business Is People (1976)
- Munni (1975)
- Ek Anek Aur Ekta (Short) (1974)
- Flowers Everywhere - 1973
- Mehmaan (1972)
- The Fire (Short) (1972)
- Ek Do (1971)
- Kahani Har Zamane Ki (1971)
- Na (1971)
- The Climb (1970)

=== As producer ===
- Trade (Short) (1998)
- The Prince and the Magician (Short) (1998)
- Locked (Short) (1997)
- O (Short) (1995)
- Vartmaan (TV Series) (1994)
- Mahagiri (Short) (1994)
- Chhoti Badi Baatein (TV Series) (1986)
- Doooriyan (1979)
- Gharaonda (1977)
- Munni (1975)
- Ek Anek Aur Ekta (Short) (1974)
- The Fire (1972)
- The Climb (1970)

== Bibliography ==
- Main Shayar Toh Nahin (as Bhimsain Lakhnavi)
- Lo, Main Shayar Ho Gaya
- Main Shayar Hi Toh Tha
- Ek Jama Ek = 1
- Kuchh Kaha, Kuchh Likha, Baaki Phir Kabhi
- Animation Ki Adhuri Kahani (in English as 'Incomplete Story of Animation')

== Awards ==
- 1992 National Film Awards: Best Animation Film: Gaaye Ki Sachai: Director & Animator
- 1994 National Film Awards: Best Animation Film: Mahagiri: Producer
- 1995 National Film Awards: Best Animation Film: O : Producer
- 1997 National Film Awards: Best Animation Film: Trade: Commerce: Producer
- 2001 National Film Awards: Special Jury Award (non-feature film): Orchestra (Director)
