= Shreeram Lagoo =

Indian actor (1927–2019)

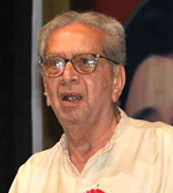
- Lagoo in 2010
- Born: 16 November 1927; Satara, Bombay Presidency, British India
- Died: 17 December 2019 (aged 92); Pune, Maharashtra, India
- Education: M.B.B.S, M.S
- Alma mater: B.J.M.C., Pune
- Occupations: Actor; Theatre Artist; ENT Surgeon
- Years active: 1927–2019
- Spouse: Deepa Basrur (m. 1962)
- Children: 3
- Honours: • Kalidas Samman (1997) • PunyaBhushan (2007) • Sangeet Natak Akademi Fellowship (2010)

Shreeram Lagoo (16 November 1927 – 17 December 2019) was an Indian film and theatre actor known primarily for his work in Marathi theatre and cinema, as well as his character roles in Hindi films. Over a career spanning five decades, he appeared in more than 100 films and around 40 plays, besides directing several Marathi theatrical productions. Widely regarded as one of the most influential actors of modern Marathi theatre, he was particularly acclaimed for his portrayal of Ganpatrao Belwalkar in the play Natsamrat and his performances in films such as Pinjara (1972), Samna (1975) and Sinhasan (1979). He received the Filmfare Award for Best Supporting Actor for Gharaonda (1977) and was honoured with the Padma Shri in 1974 and the Sangeet Natak Akademi Fellowship in 2010. The Government of India honoured him with Padma Shri in 1974.

He was a very vocal and active figure in furthering progressive and rational social causes. In 1999, he and social activist G. P. Pradhan undertook a fast in support of anti-corruption crusader Anna Hazare. Lagoo was also qualified as an ENT Surgeon.

== Early life ==
Shreeram Lagoo was born in Satara district, Maharashtra to Balakrishna Chintaman Lagoo and Satyabhama Lagoo, and was the eldest of four children. He attended Bhave High School, Fergusson College and B. J. Medical College, India and completed his MBBS and MS qualifications.

== Career ==
Lagoo started acting in plays during his college years. Gaining further interest in theatre, he created a group "Progressive Dramatic Association", with like-minded senior friends like Bhalba Kelkar. Meanwhile, he received a degree in ENT Surgery from University of Mumbai in the early fifties and practised in Pune for six years before going to Canada and England for additional training.

He practised medicine and surgery in Pune, India and Tabora, Tanzania in the sixties, but his theatre activity through Progressive Dramatic Association in Pune and "Rangaayan" in Mumbai continued when he was in India. In 1969, at the age of 42, he became a full-time actor. on Marathi stage, debuting in the play Ithe Oshalala Mrityu (इथे ओशाळला मृत्यु; transl. Where Death Shied Away), written by Vasant Kanetkar.

Lagoo finally started working as a full-time drama actor in the year 1969, from Vasant Kanetkar's play "Where Death Shied Away". He played a leading role in the play 'Natsamrat' written by Kusumagraj (Vishnu Vaman Shirwadkar) and was best remembered for that role. He had a legendary status in Marathi cinema, where he did many memorable movies which included successes like Sinhasan, Pinjra and Mukta. In 1980, his license was cancelled by Medical Council of India after he appeared in an advertisement of Chyavanprash by Dabur.

His wife, Deepa Lagoo, is also a noted theatre, TV, and film actress. He had two sons and a daughter. Lagoo had instituted the prestigious Tanveer Samman, an award given to stalwarts in Indian theatre, in the memory of his bereaved son, Tanveer Lagoo.

== Awards and recognition ==
Dr. Shreeram Lagoo receiving the Sangeet Natak Akademi Fellowship, 2009

- 1974, Filmfare Award for Best Actor – Marathi for Sugandhi Katta
- 1975, Filmfare Award for Best Actor – Marathi for Samna
- 1978, Maharashtra State Film Award for Best Actor for Devkinandan Gopala
- 1978, Filmfare Award for Best Supporting Actor for Gharaonda
- 1978, Nominated - Filmfare Award for Best Supporting Actor for Kinara
- 1981, Nominated - Filmfare Award for Best Supporting Actor for Insaf Ka Tarazu
- 1997, Kalidas Samman
- 2006, Awarded the Master Dinanath Mangeshkar Smruti Pratisthan for his contribution to cinema and theater.
- 2007, Punyabhushan Puraskar
- 2010, Sangeet Natak Akademi Fellowship

== Religious beliefs ==
Shriram was a known non-religious rationalist. Once after being conferred with an award called Punyabhushan (Pride of Pune) on behalf of the organization called Tridal, he was interviewed by Sudhir Gadgil. In the interview, when asked about Jabbar Patel's play, wherein Lagoo had to stand before Lord Vitthal, "Did you stand there as a devotee or only as per the demand of the script?" Lagoo replied "I stood there as if I was standing in front of a stone idol that is known as Panduranga".

He wrote an article titled "Time to Retire God", which provoked hot discussions in the print media and other public platforms in India.

He was actively associated with the anti-superstition movement in Maharashtra. He was a close friend of Narendra Dabholkar and used to deliver lectures for some programs of the ANS, an organisation Dabholkar founded. In 1991, Lagoo and Dabholkar were attacked with sticks by a mob in Sangli.

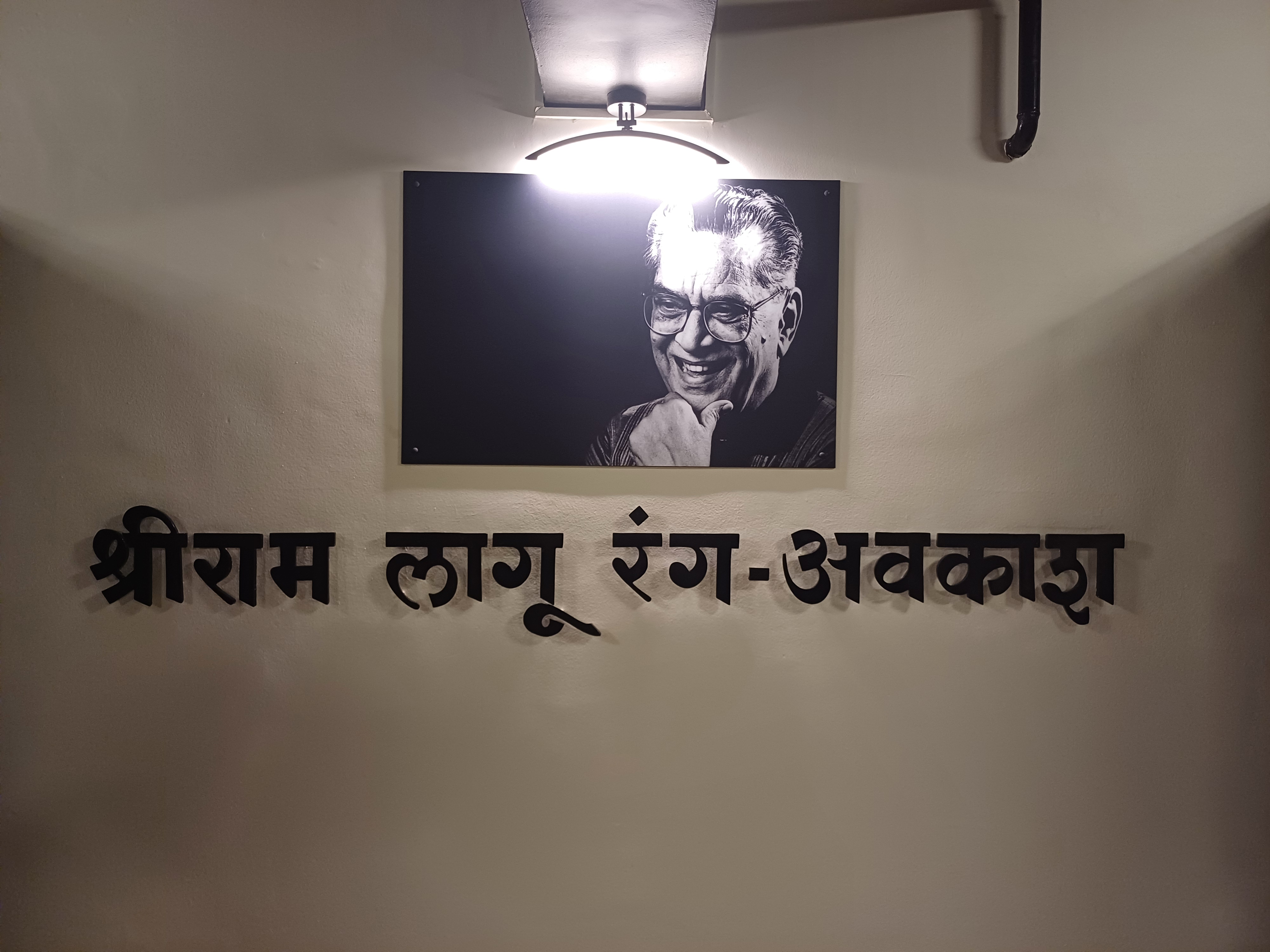
Lobby of Shreeram Lagoo Rang-avkash in Pune

== Illness and death ==
Lagoo suffered from Parkinsons in the latter part of his life. He died at the age of 92, on 17 December 2019 in Pune due to age-related complications.

To honour his memory, the Maharashtra Culture Centre established an experimental theatre auditorium, Shreeram Lagoo Rang-Avkash, in Pune in 2024. The theatre was inaugurated by Naseeruddin Shah and Mohan Agashe.
