= Bhupinder Singh (musician) =

Indian ghazal singer (1940–2022)

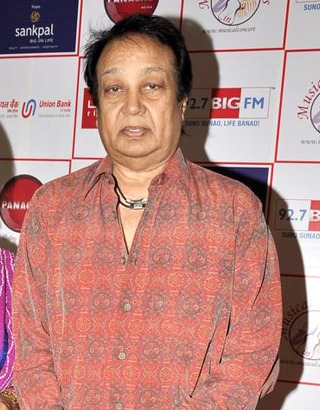
- Bhupinder Singh in February 2013

Background information
- Also known as: Bhupi
- Born: 6 February 1940; Amritsar, Punjab, British India
- Died: 18 July 2022 (aged 82) Mumbai, Maharashtra, India
- Genres: Playback singing
- Occupations: Ghazal singer and composer
- Instrument: Guitar
- Years active: 1964–2022
- Spouse: Mitali Singh

Bhupinder Singh (born Bhupinder Soin, 6 February 1940 – 18 July 2022) was an Indian musician, a ghazal singer and also a Bollywood playback singer.

== Early life ==
Bhupinder Singh was born in Amritsar, Punjab to Natha Singh ji, a musician and his introducer to music. Bhupinder's father was a stern teacher, and at one point, he detested music and its instruments.

== Music career ==
Singh started his career as a casual artist for All India Radio under the direction of Satish Bhatia. He also worked at Doordarshan Center, New Delhi. He also learnt guitar. In 1962, music director Madan Mohan heard him at a dinner hosted by Satish Bhatia in his honour (Satish Bhatia was Producer in AIR Delhi and Singh was working under him as a guitarist), and called him to Bombay. He was given the opportunity to sing the song Hoke Majboor Mujhe Usne Bulaya Hoga alongside Mohammed Rafi, Talat Mahmood and Manna Dey in Chetan Anand's Haqeeqat. He was given a solo by Khayyam in film Aakhri Khat. Singh's voice is one of the most unique in playback singing. He has sung a few popular duets with Kishore Kumar and Mohammed Rafi.

Thereafter, Singh started releasing private albums wherein his first LP had three self-composed songs and was released in 1968, a second LP of ghazals wherein he introduced the Spanish guitar, bass and drums to the ghazal style, released in 1978 and his third LP titled Woh Jo Shair Tha, for which the lyrics were written by Gulzar in 1980.

Entering wedlock with Bangladeshi singer Mitali, he stopped playback singing in the mid-1980s and began singing jointly for several albums and live concerts. Together, they produced many ghazal and geet cassettes.

His famous songs include "Dil Dhoondta hai", "Do diwane shahar mein", "Naam gum jayega", "Karoge yaad to", "Thodi si Zameen Thoda Aasman", "Meethe bol bole", "Kabhi kisi ko mukammal", "Kisi nazar ko tera intezaar aaj bhi", and "Ek akela is Shehar Mein". He sang the song Duniya Chute Yaar Na Toote picturized on Rajesh Khanna. R. D. Burman made him sing songs like Raat Banoo Mein Geet Bano Tum, Naam Gum Jayega, Kahiya Kahan Se Aana Hua and Beete Na Bitaai Raina which made him famous.

== Personal life ==
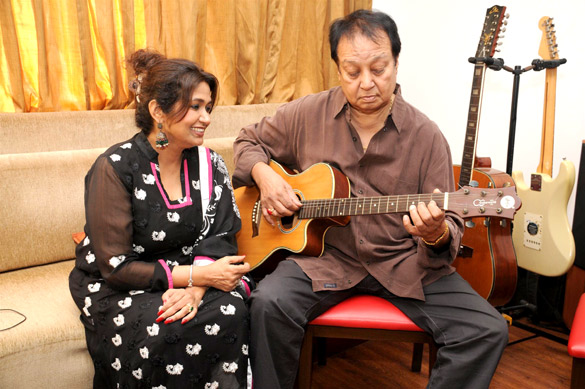
Bhupinder and his wife Mitali Singh rehearse for their upcoming music album Aksar

In the 80s, Bhupinder married the Bangladeshi singer Mitali Mukherjee. Together, they performed ghazal on Doordarshan and concerts. They have a son named Nihal Singh who is also a musician.

At the age of 82, Singh died of a cardiac arrest on 18 July 2022. He suffered from COVID-19 and colon cancer was also suspected.

== Discography ==
Album	Year	Details
Dream Sellers	1980	Includes various songs from Bollywood movies he had already sung before.
Aarzoo		With Mitali Singh
Chandani Raat		With Mitali Singh
Gulmohar		With Mitali Singh
Ghazal Ke Phool		With Mitali Singh
Ek Arzoo	2004	With Mitali Mukherjee Singh. Label: T-Series
Surmayi Raat	2013	With Gulzar
Anand Lok Meh	2014	With Mitali Singh
Yaad-E-Mehboob		With Jagjit Singh, Chitra Singh and others.
Meri Aawaaz Hi Pehchan Hai		Two songs with Lata Mangeshkar. Album Artists: Kishore Kumar, Mohammed Rafi, Lata Mangeshkar, Bhupinder Singh, Babla Mehta and Shailendra Singh. Label: Saregama

== Popular songs ==
=== As guitarist ===
- Dum Maro Dum (Hare Rama Hare Krishna), composed by Rahul Dev Burman
- Ek Hi Khwaab, composed by Rahul Dev Burman
- Waadiyaan Meraa Daaman (Abhilasha), composed by Rahul Dev Burman
- Chura liya hai (Yaadon Ki Baaraat), composed by Rahul Dev Burman
- Chingari Koi Bhadke (Amar Prem), composed by Rahul Dev Burman
- Chalte Chalte (Chalte Chalte), composed by Bappi Lahiri
- Mehbooba O Mehbooba (Sholay), composed by Rahul Dev Burman
- Ambar ki ek paak surahi (Kadambari), composed by Ustad Vilayat Khan
- Tum jo mil gaye ho (Hanste Zakhm), composed by Madan Mohan

=== As playback singer ===
- "Hoke Majboor Mujhe Usne Bulaya Hoga", composed by Madan Mohan
- "Aane Se Uske Aaye Bahar" from the movie Jeene Ki Raah (1969) with Mohammed Rafi (Music composed by Laxmikant-Pyarelal)
- "Duniya Chhute Yaar Na Chhute" from the movie Dharam Kanta (1982) with Mohammed Rafi (Music composed by Naushad)
- "Kisi Nazar Ko Tera Intezar Aaj Bhi Hai" from the movie Aitbaar (1985) with Asha Bhosle (Music composed by Bappi Lahiri)
- "Awaaz Di Hai Aaj Ek Nazar Ne" from the movie Aitbaar (1985) with Asha Bhosle (Music composed by Bappi Lahiri)
- "Thodi Si Zameen Thoda Aasman" from the movie Sitara (1980) with Lata Mangeshkar (Music composed by R. D. Burman)
- "Gulab Jism Ka", film Anjuman (1986) (composed by Khayyam)
- "Beeti Na Beetai Raina", film Parichay (1972) (composed by Rahul Dev Burman)
- "Dil Dhoondta Hai", film Mausam (1975) (composed by Madan Mohan)
- "Naam Gum Jayega", film Kinara (1977) (composed by Rahul Dev Burman)
- "Ek Akela Is Shaher Mein", film Gharonda (composed by Jaidev)
- "Daro Deewar Pe/Khush Raho Ahle Vatan Andolan (1977) composed by Jaidev
- "Huzoor Is Kadar bhi na Itra ke Chaliye" (movie:-Maasoom), composed by Rahul Dev Burman
- "Hothon Pe Aisi Baat" Jewel Thief (1967) composed by Sachin Dev Burman
- "Kaise Kahoon" & "Paduthamma Kaatrin Alaigal"(Title Track) from Tamil film Nandu 1981, composed by Ilayaraja
- "Tum say jo bat hui tum say jo mulaqat hui" (composed by Uttam-Jagdesh)
- "Baadalon se Kaat Kaat ke" from the movie Satya (1998) (composed by Vishal Bharadwaj)
- "Karoge Yaad to Har Baat Yaad Aayegi" from the movie Bazaar (1982) composed by Khayyam
- "Kabhi Kisi Ko Mukammal Jahan nahi milta" from the movie Ahista Ahista (1981) (composed by Khayyam)
- "Rut Jawan Jawan" from the movie Aakhri Khat (composed by Khayyam)
- "Layee Hayaat Aye Qaza Le Chali Chale" { Bhupinder Singh } Ibrahim Zauq *Mirza Ghalib
- "Zindagi Zindagi Mere Ghar Aanaa", film Dooriyaan (1979) (composed by Jaidev)
- "Soorajmukhi Tera Pyar Anokha Hai", film "Sooraj Mukhi" (1992), lyrics by Shardanand Tiwary and composed by Ajay Swami.
