= Kireet Khurana =

Indian animator (born 1967)

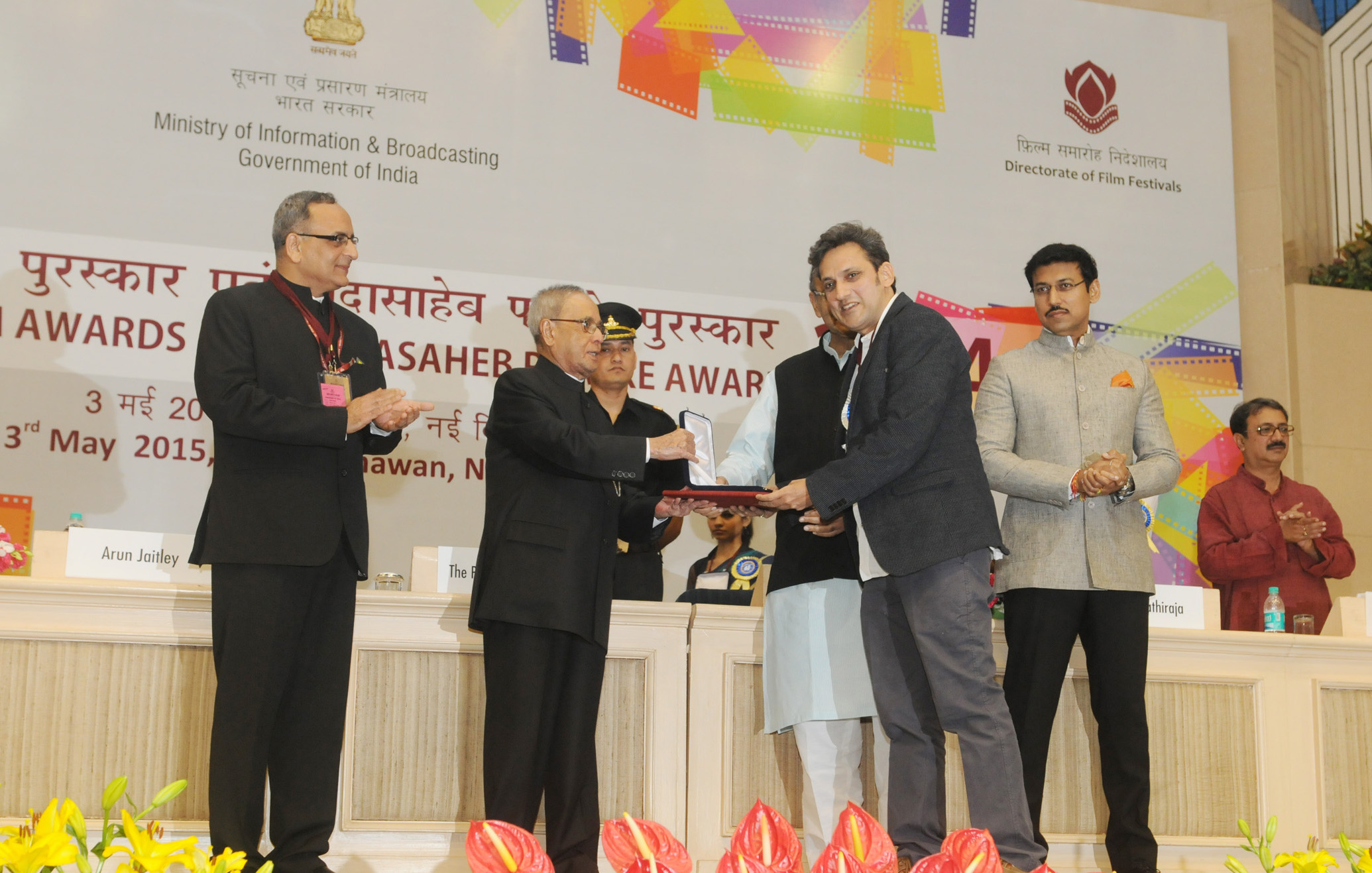
- Kireet Khurana, at the 62nd National Film Awards Function, in New Delhi on 3 May 2015
- Born: 25 October 1967 (age 59); Bombay, Maharashtra, India
- Education: Sheridan College, Canada University of Mumbai
- Occupations: Filmmaker, animator
- Years active: 1996-present
- Children: Kabeer Khurana
- Father: Bhimsain

Kireet Khurana (born 25 October 1967) is an Indian filmmaker, animator, and ad-film director. He is known for having received 6 President's National Film Awards for his contribution to the animation industry. He is the director of Climb Media, a company started by his father, filmmaker Bhimsain in the 70s. Apart from feature films and documentaries, he has also directed and produced 500+ ad films.

Kireet has been the Festival Director of Animela, India's first Animation, Visual Effects, Gaming and Comics festival, in collaboration with Annecy International Animation Film Festival, France.

== Work ==
Kireet joined his father's company after college, doing the animation for India's largest animation series Vartmaan. In 2002, he created India's first animation series to be licensed called The Adventures of Chhota Birbal, which aired on Cartoon Network. The series featured voices of Tabassum and Ravi Baswani.

In 2010, he made his debut with India's first feature film combining live-action and 3D animation, Toonpur Ka Superrhero, starring Ajay Devgan and Kajol.

Kireet has been a loud voice in social issues with activism films like Safar, Pravaasi and Samvaad, where he has used voice-overs of prominent personalities like Taapsee Pannu, Shabana Azmi, Nandita Das and Tisca Chopra.

His 2016 documentary on Indian parallel cinema auteur Saeed Akhtar Mirza, entitled Saeed Mirza: The Leftist Sufi, released on Netflix. The film featured Mahesh Bhatt, Sudhir Mishra, Kundan Shah, Aziz Mirza, Pawan Malhotra and others. It was named among the top 10 documentaries of 2017 by Vogue India and The Hindu.

His 2018 feature film T for Taj Mahal, produced by Abis Rizvi, was premiered at the London Indian Film Festival. The trailer of the film was launched at the Cannes Film Festival (2018).

He has also written The Storyteller, starring Adil Hussain and Paresh Rawal, and directed a docu-feature The Invisible Visible, on homelessness and the destitute in India.

== Personal ==
His exposure to animation films started due to his father, Bhimsain, who was an Animator. Kireet attended the Jamnabai Narsee School and later completed a BA with a major in economics from the University of Mumbai. Soon thereafter, he graduated from Sheridan College, Canada in animation filmmaking.

He lives in Mumbai with his wife Tehzeeb, who is a noted animation educator, and his son Kabeer, who is also a filmmaker.

== Filmography ==
Year	Title	Director	Producer	Writer	Animation	Misc	Notes	Ref.
1994	Vartmaan (TV Series)	Yes						
1995	O (Short)	Yes			Yes		Winner of National Film Award	
1997	Locked (Short)				Yes			
1998	Trade (Short)	Yes			Yes			
2001	Laadli (Feature film)	Yes	Yes				Executive Producer and Co-director	
2002	The Adventures of Chhota Birbal (TV Series)	Yes	Yes	Yes				
2004	Shaadi ka Laddoo (Feature film)				Yes		Animation Director	
2004	Hum Tum (Feature film)				Yes		Animation Director	
2009	Detective Naani (Feature film)				Yes		Animation Director	
2010	Toonpur ka Superrhero (Feature film)	Yes	Yes	Yes	Yes			
2013	Like Sisters (Short)		Yes	Yes				
2013	Education Counts (Short)		Yes	Yes				
2013	Komal (Short)		Yes	Yes			Winner of National Film Award	
2014	Dewang (Short)	Yes	Yes	Yes				
2014	Innocence (Short)	Yes	Yes	Yes				
2016	Saeed Mirza: The Leftist Sufi (Documentary)	Yes	Yes	Yes				
2018	T for Taj Mahal (Feature film)	Yes		Yes				
2020	Pravaasi (Short)	Yes	Yes	Yes				
2020	Safar (Short)	Yes	Yes	Yes				
2020	Samvaad (Short)	Yes	Yes	Yes				
2021	The River of Love (Feature film)		Yes				Creative Producer	
2022	Samvidhaan (Short)	Yes	Yes	Yes				
2023	The Storyteller (Feature film)			Yes				
2023	The Invisible Visible (upcoming documentary feature)	Yes	Yes	Yes				
