= Gharaonda =

- Film poster
- Directed by: Bhimsain
- Written by: Shanker Shesh (Story); Gulzar (Screenplay); Bhushan Banmali (Dialogues)
- Produced by: Bhimsain
- Starring: Amol Palekar; Zarina Wahab; Dr. Shreeram Lagoo
- Narrated by: Gulzar
- Cinematography: Apurba Kishore Bir
- Edited by: Waman Bhonsle
- Music by: Jaidev
- Release date: 1977
- Country: India
- Language: Hindi

Gharaonda (The Nest) is a 1977 Hindi drama film, produced and directed by Bhimsain. The film is woven around the housing problem in the city of Mumbai. It was based on a play Dr Shanker Shesh's story, with screenplay and dialogues written by Gulzar and Bhushan Banmali. The film stars Amol Palekar, Zarina Wahab, Shreeram Lagoo and Jalal Agha. The music director for the film is Jaidev, who scored memorable songs like Ek Akela Is Sheher Mein and Do Deewaane Sheher Mein sung by Bhupinder Singh and Runa Laila.

The film was shot at various locations in Mumbai, by noted cinematographer AK Bir, including the Bandra Fort, Naaz cafe (now closed), several beaches and the Charni Road overbridge. Despite being released alongside big-budget films like "Amar Akbar Anthony", "Parvarish", 'Hum Kisise Kum Nahin", the film had a run of 100 days at the box office. At the 25th Filmfare Awards, the film received 6 nominations including Best Film, Best Director and Best Story, and eventually Lagoo won the 1978 Filmfare Award for Best Supporting Actor for the film and Gulzar won the Filmfare Award for Best Lyricist for Do Deewane, his first. .

== Plot ==
Sudip and Chhaya are middle-class individuals from Mumbai working in the same office. Chhaya is sharing a one-room flat with her younger brother, her elder brother, and sister-in law. Sudip has rented a room with three other men. The owner of their firm, Mr. Modi, starts taking an interest in Chhaya as she looks similar to his late wife. Modi is a rich, ageing widower who is also a cardiac patient. Chhaya dislikes Modi's advances.

Sudip and Chhaya fall in love with each other and plan to get married as soon as they have their own house. They go looking for a flat. After investing in a flat in one building, they are excited about their future. After a few months, the builder turns out to be a fraud and absconds with their money. Sudip's roommate, who has also invested in the building, commits suicide. The couple is shocked and does not know how to react.

Modi eventually proposes to Chhaya. He also subtly offers to sponsor Chhaya's brother's foreign education. Chhaya is aghast at the proposal but Sudip sees a big opportunity in this. He tells her that since Modi is a cardiac patient, he is expected to die within a few months. After his death, they can marry each other and their problems of house and wealth would be solved forever. Chhaya is disillusioned with Sudip for suggesting such a disgraceful act. She reluctantly accepts Modi's proposal.

Modi and Chhaya's married life starts awkwardly, but soon she takes on the role of a dutiful wife. Modi cheers up after marriage which has a positive effect on his physical condition. Sudip keeps visiting Chhaya on the pretext of checking up on Modi's health. He is dismayed to find Modi in the pink of health.

Sudip is disheartened and resigns from his job after a brief talk with Modi. Chhaya rebukes Sudip about his constant visits and they have a confrontation. Sudip declares to Chhaya that he is leaving town that night and invites her to the railway station to elope with him. Modi overhears this conversation. He is uncertain whether Chhaya will leave him and suffers a cardiac arrest. But Chhaya stays by his side and very patiently nurses Modi back to health.

Modi takes Chhaya to the railway station. Modi tells Sudip that he is ready to divorce Chhaya and let her marry him. But Sudip does not accept it. He firmly tells Modi that he is not going to leave the city and will start all over again to improve his life.

== Cast ==
- Amol Palekar as Sudeep
- Zarina Wahab as Chhaya
- Shreeram Lagoo as Modi
- Dina Pathak as Guha's Mother
- T. P. Jain as Bade Babu
- Sudha Chopra as Chhaya's Bhabi
- Sadhu Meher as Guha (Sudeep's Roommate)
- Jalal Agha as Abdul (Sudeep's Roommate)

== Crew ==
- Director : Bhimsain
- Producer : Bhimsain
- Editor : Waman B. Bhosle
- Story : Dr. Shanker Shesh
- Screenplay : Gulzar
- Cinematographer : Binod Pradhan, A. K. Bir, D. G. Debudhar, Virendra Saini
- Costume Designer : Shammi, Waheeda
- Narrator : Gulzar
- Music Director : Jaidev
- Lyrics : Gulzar

== Music ==
All music is composed by Jaidev.

No.	Title	Lyrics	Singer(s)	Length
1.	"Ek Akela Is Shahar Mein"	Gulzar	Bhupinder Singh
2.	"Do Deewane Shahar Mein"	Gulzar	Bhupinder Singh, Runa Laila
3.	"Tumhe Ho Na Ho"	Naqsh Lyallpuri	Runa Laila

== Awards ==
Year	Award	Category	Recipient	Ref.
1978	Filmfare Awards	Best Film	Climb Films	Nominated
1978	Filmfare Awards	Best Director	Bhimsain	Nominated
1978	Filmfare Awards	Best Story	Shankar Shesh	Nominated
1978	Filmfare Awards	Best Actress	Zarina Wahab	Nominated
1978	Filmfare Awards	Best Supporting Actor	Shriram Lagoo	Won
1978	Filmfare Awards	Best Lyricist	Gulzar for "Do Deewane Sheher Mein"	Won
