= Jaidev =

Indian composer (1918–1987)

- Born: Jaidev Verma; 3 August 1918; Nairobi, Kenya
- Died: 6 January 1987 (aged 68); Mumbai, Maharashtra, India
- Years active: 1933–1987
- Awards: National Film Award for Best Music Direction; Reshma Aur Shera (1972); Gaman (1979); Ankahee (1985)

Jaidev (3 August 1918 – 6 January 1987; born Jaidev Verma) was a music composer in Hindi films, most known for his work in films: Hum Dono (1961), Reshma Aur Shera (1971), Prem Parbat (1973), Gharaonda (1977) and Gaman (1978).

He won the National Film Award for Best Music Direction thrice, for Reshma Aur Shera (1972), Gaman (1979) and Ankahee (1985).

== Early life ==
Jaidev was born in Nairobi and brought up in Ludhiana, India. In 1933, when he was 15 years old, he ran away to Mumbai to become a film star. There, he acted in eight films as a child star for the Wadia Film Company. He was initiated into music at a young age in Ludhiana by Prof. Barkat Rai. Later, when he made it in Mumbai, he learnt music from Krishnarao Jaokar and Janardan Jaokar.

Unfortunately, he had to leave his film career abruptly and return to Ludhiana, due to his father's blindness, which thrust the sole responsibility of his family on his young shoulders.

After his father died, Jaidev took the responsibility of looking after his sister, Ved Kumari and later got her married to Sat-Paul Varma. After that in 1943, he left for Lucknow to study under the tutelage of music maestro Ustad Ali Akbar Khan.

== Career ==
Jaidev was the first music director to bag 3 National Awards. Ali Akbar Khan took Jaidev as his music assistant, in 1951, when he composed music for Navketan Films's Aandhiyan (1952) and 'Hum Safar'. From film 'Taxi Driver' on, he became assistant to music composer, S. D. Burman.

His big break as a full-fledged music director came with Chetan Anand's film, Joru Ka Bhai, followed by Chetan Anand's next Anjali, both of these films became very popular.

Though it was with Navketan's film Hum Dono (1961) that Jaidev true came into the limelight, with classic songs like, "Allah Tero Naam", "Abhi Na Jao Chhodkar", "Main Zindagi Ka Saath" and "Kabhi Khud Pe Kabhi Halat Pe". His other big success came with the Sunil Dutt starrer, Mujhe Jeene Do (1963).

Though many of Jaidev's films failed at the box office, many of them, such as Alaap, Kinare Kinare and Ankahee, are remembered for his imaginative musical scores. Jaidev shot to prominence once again with his ghazals and songs in Muzaffar Ali's Gaman like Seene mein jalan, Raat bhar aapki yaad aati rahi and Ajeeb saaneha mujhpar guzar gaya yaaron. He introduced many new singers like Suresh Wadkar, A Hariharan and his protegee Chhaya Ganguly in Gaman.

Jaidev had a unique capability to mix traditional and folk music into Hindi film situations, giving him a unique advantage over other music directors of his times.

He also known for his non-film album of the couplets of Hindi poet Harivansh Rai Bachchan's classic work Madhushala set to music and sung by singer Manna Dey.

He is one of the favourite composers of Lata Mangeshkar besides Salil Chowdhury and Madan Mohan. He also composed music for Nepali film Maitighar.

Jaidev never married. He remained close to his sister's family who later settled in the United Kingdom. He died on 6 January 1987 at the age of 68.

== Filmography ==
- Joru Ka Bhai (1955)
- Samudri Daaku (1956)
- Anjali (1957)
- Arpan (1957)
- Raat Ke Raahi (1959)
- Ek Ke Baad Ek as a music assistant
- Hum Dono (1961)
- Kinare Kinare (1963)
- Mujhe Jeene Do (1963)
- Guide (1965)
- Maitighar (Nepali film) (1966)
- Hamare Gham Se Mat Khelo (1967)
- Jiyo Aur Jeene Do (1969)
- Sapna (1969)
- Kalpavruksha (1969) - Kannada film
- Ashadh Ka Ek Din (1971)
- Do Boond Pani (1971)
- Ek Thi Reeta (1971)
- Reshma Aur Shera (1971)
- Sampoorn Dev Darshan (1971)
- Aatish, a.k.a. Daulat Ka Nasha (1972)
- Bhaavna (1972)
- Bharat Darshan (1972)
- Man Jaiye (1972)
- Aalingan (1973)
- Aazadi Pachchis Baras Ki (1973)
- Prem Parbat (1973)
- Faasla (1974)
- Parinay (1974)
- Andolan (1975)
- Ek Hans Ka Joda (1975)
- Shadi Kar Lo (1975)
- Laila Majnu (1976)
- Alaap (1977)
- Gharonda (1977)
- Kissa Kursee Ka (1977)
- Wohi Baat, a.k.a. Sameera (1977)
- Doooriyan (1978)
- Gaman (1978)
- Solva Sawan (1978)
- Tumhare Liye (1978)
- Aai Teri Yaad (1980)
- Ek Gunah Aur Sahi (1980)
- Ramnagri (1982)
- Ek Naya Itihaas (1983)
- Amar Jyoti (1984)
- Ankahee (1984)
- Jumbish (1985)
- Trikon Ka Chautha Kon (1986)
- Khunnus (1987)
- Chand Grahan (1997)

=== Other credits ===
- Chalti Ka Naam Gaadi (1958) (music assistant)
- Lajwanti (1958) (music assistant)

=== As actor ===
- Keemat (1973)
- Miss Frontier Mail (1936)
- Hunterwali (1935)
- Marthanda Varma (1933)

== Awards ==
- National Film Award for Best Music Direction:
  - Ankahee (1985)
  - Gaman (1979)
  - Reshma Aur Shera (1972)
- Sur Singar Samsad Awards, four times
- Lata Mangeshkar Award Madhya Pradesh Government.
