= List of Hindi films of 1990 =

The Hindi films produced by Bollywood film industry based in Mumbai in 1990.

== Top-grossing films ==
The top-grossing Bollywood films in 1990:

1990 Rank	Title	Cast
1.	Dil	Aamir Khan, Madhuri Dixit, Anupam Kher, Adi Irani
2.	Ghayal	Sunny Deol, Meenakshi Seshadri, Raj Babbar, Moushumi Chatterjee, Amrish Puri, Sudesh Berry
3.	Aaj Ka Arjun	Amitabh Bachchan, Jaya Prada, Amrish Puri
4.	Kishen Kanhaiya	Anil Kapoor, Madhuri Dixit, Shilpa Shirodkar, Amrish Puri
5.	Thanedaar	Jeetendra, Jaya Prada, Madhuri Dixit, Sanjay Dutt, Kiran Kumar
6.	Hum Se Na Takrana	Dharmendra, Mithun Chakraborty, Shatrughan Sinha
7.	Baaghi	Salman Khan, Nagma, Shakti Kapoor, Mohnish Behl
8.	Maha-Sangram	Vinod Khanna, Govinda, Madhuri Dixit, Aditya Pancholi, Shakti Kapoor
9.	Agneepath	Amitabh Bachchan, Mithun Chakraborty, Madhavi, Neelam Kothari, Danny Denzongpa
10.	Swarg	Govinda, Juhi Chawla, Rajesh Khanna
11.	Aashiqui	Rahul Roy, Anu Aggarwal, Tom Alter, Deepak Tijori
12.	Ghar Ho To Aisa	Anil Kapoor, Meenakshi Sheshadri
13.	Jurm	Vinod Khanna, Meenakshi Sheshadri, Sangeeta Bijlani
14.	Doodh Ka Karz	Jackie Shroff, Neelam, Varsha Usgaonkar
15.	Naakabandi	Dharmendra, Sridevi, Chunky Pandey, Amrish Puri

== Released films ==
Title	Director	Cast	Genre	Sources
Aadhi Haqeeqat, Aadha Fasana	Dilip Ghosh		Documentary	
Aaj Ka Arjun	K.C. Bokadia	Amitabh Bachchan, Jaya Prada, Raadhika, Amrish Puri	Action, Drama	
Aag Ka Dariya	S. V. Rajendra Singh Babu	Dilip Kumar, Rekha, Padmini Kolhapure, Amrita Singh	Drama	
Aaj Ke Shahenshah	Shibu Mitra	Raj Babbar, Jeetendra, Kimi Katkar	Action	
Aandhiyan	David Dhawan	Shatrughan Sinha, Mumtaz, Prosenjit Chatterjee	Drama	
Aashiqui	Mahesh Bhatt	Rahul Roy, Anu Aggarwal, Tom Alter	Romance, Drama	
Abu Kaliya	C. K. Kader	Premnath Gulati, Majid Khan, Sulakshana Khatri		
Agneekaal	Abbas-Mustan	Jeetendra, Sadashiv Amrapurkar, Tinnu Anand, Raj Babbar	Action, Crime Drama	
Agneepath	Mukul S. Anand	Amitabh Bachchan, Mithun Chakraborty, Madhavi, Neelam Kothari, Danny Denzongpa, Biswa Roy	Action	
Ajooba	Shashi Kapoor	Amitabh Bachchan, Rishi Kapoor, Dimple Kapadia, Sonam, Shammi Kapoor, Amrish Puri, Saeed Jaffrey, Dara Singh, Dalip Tahil, Sushma Seth, Tinnu Anand, Narendra Nath	Fantasy Adventure	Laxmikant Pyarelal
Amba	Mohan Kumar	Shabana Azmi, Anil Kapoor, Meenakshi Seshadri	Family	
Amiri Garibi	Harmesh Malhotra	Jeetendra, Rekha, Rishi Kapoor	Family	
Amavas Ki Raat	Mohan Bhakri	Kunika, Kiran Kumar, Javed Khan	Horror	
Andher Gardi	Ashok Tyagi	Kimi Katkar		
Apmaan Ki Aag	Talukdaars	Govinda, Sonam, Adil Amaan, Rakesh Bedi, Dasharat	Action, Comedy, Crime	
Atishbaz	Mukhtar Ahmed	Tom Alter, Renu Arya, Prem Chopra		
Aulad Ki Khatir	Kanwar Jagdish	Nutan, Shreepradha		
Awaargi	Mahesh Bhatt	Anil Kapoor, Govinda, Paresh Rawal, Meenakshi Seshadri	Drama	
Awaaz De Kahan Hai	Sibte Hassan Rizvi	Bindu, Annu Kapoor, Satyendra Kapoor		
Awaragardi	Swaroop Kumar	Kimi Katkar, Raza Murad, Aditya Pancholi		
Awwal Number	Dev Anand	Dev Anand, Aamir Khan, Ekta Sohini	Action	
Azaad Desh Ke Gulam	S. A. Chandrasekhar	Rishi Kapoor, Rekha, Jackie Shroff, Vikas Anand, Rakesh Bedi, Suresh Bhagwat, Pran	Action, Family	
Baaghi	Deepak Shivdasani	Salman Khan, Nagma, Shakti Kapoor	Action, Romance	
Baap Numbri Beta Dus Numbri	Aziz Sejawal	Kader Khan, Shakti Kapoor, Jackie Shroff, Farah, Aditya Pancholi, Sabeeha	Action, Crime, Comedy	
Bad-Naam	Anand Girdhar	Sadashiv Amrapurkar, Verma Malik		
Bahaar Aane Tak	Tariq Shah	Roopali Ganguly, Ram Mohan, Navin Nischol	Family	
Bandh Darwaza	Shyam Ramsay, Tulsi Ramsay	Hashmat Khan, Manjeet Kular, Kunika	Action, Crime, Horror	
Chingariyan		Danny Denzongpa		
Chor Pe Mor	Kapil Kapoor	Naseeruddin Shah, Karan Shah, Neelam Kothari	Comedy, Drama	
C.I.D.	Ajay Goel	Vinod Khanna, Amrita Singh, Suresh Oberoi		
College Girl	Surendra Gupta	Amita Nangia, Pankaj Berry, Veerendra Singh	Drama	
Deewana Mujh Sa Nahin	Y. Nageshwar Rao	Aamir Khan, Madhuri Dixit	Romance	
Dil	Indra Kumar	Aamir Khan, Madhuri Dixit, Anupam Kher, Saeed Jaffrey	Comedy, Drama, Romance	
Din Dahade	Mohan Segal	Sunil Puri, Kamran Rizvi, Sriprada		
Disha	Sai Paranjape	Shabana Azmi, Nana Patekar, Raghuvir Yadav	Comedy, Drama, Musical	
Doodh Ka Karz	Ashok Gaikwad	Jackie Shroff, Neelam Kothari, Prem Chopra	Action, Crime, Romance, Thriller	
Drishti	Govind Nihalani	Dimple Kapadia, Shekhar Kapur, Mita Vasisht	Drama	
Dushman	Shakti Samanta	Mithun Chakraborty, Mandakini, Sadashiv Amrapurkar	Action	
Ek Doctor Ki Maut	Tapan Sinha	Pankaj Kapur, Shabana Azmi, Anil Chatterjee	Drama	
Ek Ghar	Girish Kasaravalli	Chanda, Rohini Hattangadi, Deepti Naval	Drama	
Ek Number Ka Chor	Tajdar Amrohi	Shagufta Ali, Rita Bhaduri, Aatish Devgan	Action, Crime, Drama	
Ghar Ho To Aisa	Kalpataru	Anil Kapoor, Meenakshi Seshadri, Raj Kiran	Family	
Ghar Ki Laxmi		Shilpa Shirodkar		
Ghayal	Rajkumar Santoshi	Sunny Deol, Meenakshi Seshadri, Raj Babbar, Moushumi Chatterjee, Amrish Puri	Action, Thriller	
Gunahon Ka Devta	Kawal Sharma	Sangeeta Bijlani, Mithun Chakraborty, Chandrashekhar	Action	
Haar Jeet	Avtar Bhogal	Kabir Bedi, Shafi Inamdar, Puneet Issar		
Haatim Tai	Babubhai Mistry	Jeetendra, Sangeeta Bijlani, Sonu Walia	Fantasy	
Hamari Shaadi	Basu Chatterjee	Akhil Mishra		
Hum Se Na Takrana	Dipak Bahry	Dharmendra, Shatrughan Sinha, Mithun Chakraborty, Leena Das	Action, Crime, Drama, Horror	
Izzatdaar	K. Bapaiah	Dilip Kumar, Govinda, Madhuri Dixit, Raghuvaran	Drama, Thriller	
Jaan-E-Wafa	Rukun	Farooq Sheikh, Rati Agnihotri, Pradeep Khayyam		
Jagira	Kanti Shah	Danny Denzongpa	Action	
Jamai Raja	A. Kodandarami Reddy	Anil Kapoor, Madhuri Dixit, Hema Malini, Shakti Kapoor	Drama	
Jawani Zindabad	Arun Bhatt	Aamir Khan, Farha Naaz, Kader Khan	Drama	
Jeene Do		Sanjay Dutt, Jackie Shroff, Farha Naaz	Action	
Jeevan Ek Sanghursh	Rahul Rawail	Rakhee Gulzar, Anil Kapoor, Madhuri Dixit	Action, Drama	
Jungle Love	V. Menon	Satish Shah	Action, Adventure	
Jurm	Mahesh Bhatt	Vinod Khanna, Meenakshi Seshadri, Sangeeta Bijlani	Action	
Kaafila	Sudhanshu Hakku	Sadashiv Amrapurkar, Joy Augustine, Juhi Chawla	Drama, Thriller	
Kaarnama	Ranjeet	Vinod Khanna, Satyendra Kapoor, Kimi Katkar		
Kafan	Dhirendra Bohra	Tina Ghai, Jamuna, Huma Khan	Horror	
Kali Ganga	Raj N. Sippy	Dimple Kapadia, Govinda, Suresh Oberoi	Action	
Kanoon Ki Zanjeer	P. Lakshman			
Karishma Kali Kaa	Ashok Punjabi	Urmila Bhatt, Anil Dhawan, C. S. Dubey		
Kasam Dhande Ki	T. Gautam Bhatia	Master Bhagwan, Suresh Bhai, Birbal	Action, Crime, Drama, Comedy	
Khatarnaak	Bharat Rangachary	Sanjay Dutt, Anita Raj, Farha Naaz	Action, Crime, Drama	
Kishen Kanhaiya	Rakesh Roshan	Anil Kapoor, Madhuri Dixit, Shilpa Shirodkar, Amrish Puri	Drama, Sentiment	
Kroadh	Shashilal K. Nair	Sunny Deol, Sanjay Dutt, Amrita Singh	Action	
Lohe Ke Haath	S. S. Arora	Javed Khan, Anuradha Patel, Kapil Karzan, Rita Bhaduri	Drama	
Maha-Sangram	Mukul Anand	Madhuri Dixit, Vinod Khanna, Govinda, Shakti Kapoor, Aditya Pancholi	Romance	
Majboor	T. Rama Rao	Jeetendra, Sunny Deol, Jaya Prada	Action	
Mera Pati Sirf Mera Hai	Manobala	Jeetendra, Rekha, Radhika	Drama	
Meri Lalkaar	Yash Chauhan	Sumeet Saigal, Shreepradha, Rohini, Gulshan Grover, Sadashiv Amrapurkar		
Muqaddar Ka Badshaah	T. Rama Rao	Vinod Khanna, Shabana Azmi, Vijayshanti, Kader Khan, Asrani, Amrish Puri	Action	
Naka-Bandi	Shibu Mitra	Dharmendra, Chunky Pandey, Sonam, Sridevi		
Naya Khoon	Rajat Rakshit	Govinda, Mandakini	Action	
Nyay Anyay	Lawrence D'Souza	Jeetendra, Jaya Prada, Sumeet Saigal	Action	
Pathar Ke Insan	Shomu Mukherjee	Vinod Khanna, Jackie Shroff	Action	
Pati Patni Aur Tawaif	Raj Kumar Kohli	Mithun Chakraborty, Farah, Salma Agha, Amjad Khan	Drama	
Police Public	Esmayeel Shroff	Raaj Kumar, Naseeruddin Shah, Raj Kiran, Vijay Aidasani, Jayshree Arora, Ila Arun	Action, Crime, Drama	
Pratibandh	Ravi Raja Pinisetty	Chiranjeevi, Juhi Chawla, Rami Reddy	Action	
Pyar Ka Karz	K. Bapaiah	Dharmendra, Mithun Chakraborty, Meenakshi Seshadri, Sonam	Action	
Pyaar Ka Toofan	S.M. Iqbal	Aditya Pancholi, Vijayata Pandit, Jamuna, Pran		
Pyar Ke Naam Qurbaan	B. Subhash	Mithun Chakraborty, Dimple Kapadia, Mandakini	Action, Crime, Drama, Romance	
Pyasi Nigahen		Birbal, Sahila Chaddha, Ajinkya Deo	Thriller	
Qatil Jawani		Babloo, Hari, Harish Kumar	Crime, Drama, Thriller	
Qayamat Ki Raat	Harvey-Pappu	Aasif Sheikh, Sabeeha, Shakti Kapoor		
Roti Ki Keemat	Ramesh Ahuja	Sadashiv Amrapurkar, Rana Jung Bahadur, Mithun Chakraborty, Pran	Action, Crime, Drama	
Sailaab	Deepak Balraj	Aditya Pancholi, Madhuri Dixit, Shafi Inamdar	Action, Romance	
Sapne Huye Sakaar	Prema Karanth			
Shadyantra	Rajan Johri	Ishrat Ali, Raj Babbar, Urmila Bhatt	Action, Crime, Drama	
Shaitani Ilaaka	Kiran Ramsay	Sunil Dhawan, Shehnaz Kudia, Neelam Mehra	Horror	
Shandaar	Vinod Dewan	Mithun Chakraborty, Meenakshi Seshadri, Juhi Chawla, Danny Denzongpa		
Shararat		Rakesh Roshan, Shubha		
Sher Dil	Mohan Segal	Dharmendra, Gulshan Grover, Rohini Hattangadi	Action, Crime, Drama	
Shera Shamshera	S.R. Pratap			
Sheshnaag	K. R. Reddy	Jeetendra, Rekha, Rishi Kapoor	Fantasy	
Shiva	Ram Gopal Verma	Nagarjuna, Amala, Raghuvaran	Action, Drama	
Solah Satra	Munna Rizvi	Arbaaz Ali Khan, Ashwin Verma, Ekta Sohini	Romance	
Sun Sajna				
Swarg	David Dhawan	Rajesh Khanna, Govinda, Juhi Chawla	Drama	
Tadap		Chunky Pandey, Meenakshi Seshadri, Nana Patekar		
Tejaa	Ramesh Puri	Sanjay Dutt, Kimi Katkar, Sonu Walia	Action	
Teri Talash Mein		Amala, Rana Jung Bahadur, Rita Bhaduri	Crime, Drama, Romance, Thriller	
Thanedaar	Raj Sippy	Jeetendra, Sanjay Dutt, Jaya Prada, Madhuri Dixit	Action, Crime, Drama	
Thodasa Roomani Ho Jayen	Amol Palekar	Anita Kanwar, Nana Patekar, Riju Bajaj	Drama, Musical	
Tum Mere Ho	Tahir Hussain	Aamir Khan, Juhi Chawla	Romance	
Veeru Dada	K. R. Reddy	Dharmendra, Amrita Singh, Aditya Pancholi	Action, Drama, Adventure	
Wafaa	S. M. Abbas	Farooq Sheikh, Vijayeta Pandit		
Zahreelay	Jyotin Goel	Jeetendra, Sanjay Dutt, Chunky Pandey	Action	
Zakhmi Zameen	Mahendra Shah	Ishrat Ali, Jaya Prada, Adiya Pancholi, Paresh Rawal	Drama	
Zimmedaaar	Santosh Kumar Chauhan	Rajiv Kapoor, Anita Raj, Kimi Katkar		

== See also ==
- List of Hindi films of 1989
- List of Hindi films of 1991
