= List of Hindi films of 1983 =

A list of films produced by the Bollywood film industry based in Mumbai in 1983:

== Highest-grossing films ==
The ten highest-grossing films at the Indian box office in 1983:

Rank	Title	Gross collection
1	Coolie	₹18 crore
2	Betaab	₹13.5 crore
3	Hero	₹12.5 crore
4	Himmatwala	₹12 crore
5	Andha Kanoon	₹10 crore
6	Mawaali	₹9.5 crore
7	Naukar Biwi Ka	₹9 crore
8	Justice Chaudhury	₹8.5 crore
9	Jaani Dost	₹8 crore
10	Nastik	₹7.6 crore

== Films ==
Title	Director	Cast	Genre	Sources
Aao Pyaar Karen	Prakash Verma	Benjamin Gilani, Radhika Barkatke, Amrit Patel	Romance	
Achha Bura	Hrishikesh Mukherjee	Raj Babbar, Anita Raj, Amjad Khan	World Cinema	
Agar Tum Na Hote	Lekh Tandon	Rajesh Khanna, Rekha, Raj Babbar	Drama, Family	
Agent 123	Gita Priya	Baby Indira, Master Ram Krishna, Bhanu Prakash	Thriller	
Andha Kanoon	T. Rama Rao	Rajinikanth, Hema Malini, Reena Roy, Amitabh Bachchan, Pran	Drama	
Ardh Satya	Govind Nihalani	Om Puri, Smita Patil, Amrish Puri, Sadashiv Amrapurkar	Crime, Drama	
Arohan	Shyam Benegal	Victor Banerjee, Noni Ganguly, Pankaj Kapur	Drama	
Arpan	J. Om Prakash	Jeetendra, Reena Roy, Parveen Babi	Drama, Family	
Ashray	Biplab Roy Chowdhury	Anmol Palekar, Anita Dass, Safi Inamdar		
Avtaar	Mohan Kumar	Rajesh Khanna, Shabana Azmi, Sachin, Gulshan Grover, A. K. Hangal	Family, Drama	
Bade Dil Wala	Bhappi Sonie	Rishi Kapoor, Tina Munim, Sarika, Pran	Drama, Action, Crime, Family, Romance	
Bandhan Kuchchey Dhaagon Ka	Anil Sharma	Shashi Kapoor, Zeenat Aman, Raakhee Gulzar	Drama, Family	
Bekaraar	Rajendra Prasad V.B.	Asrani, Mohnish Bahl, Mohan Choti		
Bekhabar	Kedar Kapoor	Master Bhagwan, Zarina Wahab, Madhu Kapoor, Rajendranath, K. N. Singh	Drama	
Betaab	Rahul Rawail	Sunny Deol, Amrita Singh, Nirupa Roy, Shammi Kapoor, Prem Chopra	Romance	
Chatpati	V. Ravindra	Smita Patil, Raj Kiran, Reema Lagoo	Comedy	
Chor Police	Amjad Khan	Shatrughan Sinha, Parveen Babi, Vinod Mehra, Shakti Kapoor, Ashok Kumar	Action, Crime, Drama	
Coolie	Manmohan Desai	Amitabh Bachchan, Waheeda Rehman, Rishi Kapoor, Rati Agnihotri, Shoma Anand, Kader Khan	Action	
Dard-E-Dil	Suraj Prakash	Mukesh Khanna, Zarina Wahab, Shashikala	Action	
Daulat Ke Dushman	Bimal Rawal	Shatrughan Sinha, Vinod Khanna, Manjushree, Pran	Action	
Dhat Tere... Ki	Meraj	Ravi Baswani, Abhi Bhattacharya, Akhil Mishra		
Do Gulab	Durai	Vijay Arora, Meenakshi Seshadri, Sonia Sahni, Rakesh Bedi, Dilip Dhawan	Drama, Romance	
Doosri Dulhan	Lekh Tandon	Victor Banerjee, Sharmila Tagore, Shabana Azmi	Drama, Family	
Du-Janay	Ardhendu Chatterjee			
Ek Baar Chale Aao	Jagdish Saldanah	Farooq Sheikh, Deepti Naval, Girish Karnad	Social Drama	
Ek Din Bahu Ka	Desh Gautam	Vijay Arora, Saeed Jaffrey, Suresh Oberoi	Drama	
Ek Jaan Hain Hum	Rajiv Mehra	Rakesh Bedi, Avtar Gill, Gulshan Grover, Pran	Family, Romance	
Faraib	Rajat Rakshit	Mithun Chakraborty, Ranjeeta Kaur	Action, Thriller	
Fareb	Tej Sapru			
Film Hi Film	Hiren Nag	Pran, Ramesh Deo, Seema Deo	Comedy, Drama, Musical, Romance	
Ganga Meri Maa	Shyam Ralhan	Danny Denzongpa, Iftekhar, Sujit Kumar	Action, Thriller	
Gehri Chot - Urf: Durdesh	Ambrish Sangal	Shashi Kapoor, Sharmila Tagore, Parveen Babi, Raj Babbar, Nadeem	Action, Crime, Drama	
Ghungroo	Ram Sethi	Smita Patil, Shashi Kapoor, Kunal Goswami	Family	
Godam	Dilip Chitre	Satyadev Dubey, K.K. Raina, Trupti	Drama	
Greed	Shankar Nag	Vinod Mehra		
Haadsa	Akbar Khan	Akbar Khan, Ranjeeta Kaur, Smita Patil	Action, Thriller	
Hero	Subhash Ghai	Jackie Shroff, Meenakshi Seshadri, Shammi Kapoor, Shakti Kapoor	Action	
Himmatwala	T. Rama Rao	Jeetendra, Sridevi	Drama	
Hum Se Hai Zamana	Deepak Bahry	Zeenat Aman, Major Anand, Beena Bawa	Drama	
Humse Na Jeeta Koi	Shibu Mitra	Shoma Anand, Birbal, Mohan Choti		
Jaane Bhi Do Yaaro	Kundan Shah	Naseeruddin Shah, Om Puri, Ravi Baswani	Comedy	
Jaane Jaan	Ramesh Behl	Randhir Kapoor, Neetu Singh	Drama	
Jaani Dost	K. Raghavendra Rao	Dharmendra, Jeetendra, Parveen Babi, Sridevi	Action, Comedy, Crime, Drama, Romance	
Jai Baba Amarnath	B. R. Ishara	Mohan Choti, Vikram Makandar		
Jeet Hamaari	R. Thyagarajan	Rakesh Roshan, Rajinikanth, Ranjeeta Kaur	Action	
Jeevan Sukh	Debu Sen	Praveen Paul, Dheeraj Kumar, Monica, Dhumal		
Justice Chaudhury	K. Raghavendra Rao	Jeetendra, Hema Malini, Sridevi	Action, Drama, Family, Comedy	
Kaise Kaise Log	D.S. Azad	Rohini Hattangadi, Ayesha Jhulka, Goga Kapoor		
Kalaakaar	P. Sambasiva Rao	Kunal Goswami, Sridevi, Rakesh Bedi	Family, Romance	
Kalka	Loksen Lalvani	Mazhar Khan, Paintal, Shatrughan Sinha, Sarika, Ranjeet		
Karate	Deb Mukherjee	Mithun Chakraborty, Deb Mukherjee, Mazhar Khan, Yogeeta Bali, Kajal Kiran	Action	
Kashmira	Sukhdev Ahluwalia	Veena Kapoor, Rabia Nazki, Monto		
Katha	Sai Paranjpye	Naseeruddin Shah, Farooq Shaikh, Deepti Naval	Comedy, Drama	
Kaun? Kaisey?	Anil Ganguily	Bina, Ardhendu Bose, Mithun Chakraborty, Anita Raj, Ranjeeta	Crime	
Kaya Palat	Satyen Bose	Ashok Kumar		
Kissi Se Na Kehna	Hrishikesh Mukherjee	Farooq Shaikh, Deepti Naval, Utpal Dutt	Comedy	
Lalach	Shankar Nag	Vinod Mehra, Kaajal Kiran, Bindiya Goswami, Ranjeet, Pran		
Lal Chunariya	Sudarshan Lal	Minaxi Anand, Mithun Chakraborty, Dulari	Action, Drama	
Log Kya Kahenge	B.R. Ishara	Navin Nischol, Shabana Azmi, Shatrughan Sinha	Family	
Lovers	Bharathi Raja	Kumar Gaurav, Padmini Kolhapure, Rakesh Bedi	Comedy, Drama, Romance	
Love in Goa	Hersh Kohli	Ashok Kumar, Om Prakash, Mayur Verma	Romance, Drama	
Mahaan	S. Ramanathan	Amitabh Bachchan, Waheeda Rehman, Parveen Babi, Zeenat Aman, Amjad Khan, Kader Khan, Shakti Kapoor	Action, Drama	
Main Awara Hoon	Ashim S. Samanta	Sanjay Dutt, Raj Babbar, Jaya Prada	Drama, Family	
Mandi	Shyam Benegal	Shabana Azmi, Smita Patil, Naseeruddin Shah	Comedy, Drama	
Mangal Pandey	Harmesh Malhotra	Ranjit Sood, Ajit Khan, Harbans Darshan M. Arora	Action, Crime, Thriller, Drama	
Masoom	Shekhar Kapur	Naseeruddin Shah, Shabana Azmi, Urmila Matondkar, Jugal Hansraj	Drama	
Mawaali	T. Rama Rao	Jeetendra, Sridevi, Jaya Prada, Kadar Khan, Prem Chopra, Shakti Kapoor	Drama	
Mazdoor	Ravi Chopra	Dilip Kumar, Raj Babbar, Padmini Kolhapure, Rati Agnihotri	Drama	
Mehndi	Asit Sen	Vinod Mehra, Raj Babbar, Ranjeeta Kaur		
Mujhe Insaaf Chahiye	T. Rama Rao	Mithun Chakraborty, Rekha, Rati Agnihotri	Drama	
Mujhe Vachan Do	Shibu Mitra	Mehandra Shandu, Neeta Mehta		
Nastik	Pramod Chakravorty	Amitabh Bachchan, Hema Malini, Pran, Amjad Khan	Action	
Naukar Biwi Ka	Rajkumar Kohli	Dharmendra, Reena Roy, Pran, Raj Babbar, Anita Raj, Om Prakash, Kader Khan, Vinod Mehra	Drama	
Nishaan	Surendra Mohan, Late Shri Sikander Khanna	Rajesh Khanna, Jeetendra, Rekha	Action, Drama, Family, Musical, Romance	
Painter Babu	Ashok	Rajiv Goswami, Meenakshi Seshadri, Neelima	Romance	
Pasand Apni Apni	Basu Chatterji	Mithun Chakraborty, Rati Agnihotri, Utpal Dutt	Comedy	
Prem Tapasya	Dasari Narayana Rao	Jeetendra, Rekha, Reena Roy	Drama, Family	
Pukar	Ramesh Behl	Amitabh Bachchan, Randhir Kapoor, Zeenat Aman, Tina Munim	Drama	
Pyaasi Aankhen	Ram Kelkar	Shabana Azmi, Amol Palekar, Waheeda Rehman		
Qayamat	Raj Sippy	Dharmendra, Shatrughan Sinha, Jaya Prada	Action, Drama	
Raaste Aur Rishte		Mazhar Khan, Priyadarshini		
Rachna	Sathish	Beena Banerjee, Jezebel, Anil Kapoor	Family	
Rang Birangi	Hrishikesh Mukherjee	Amol Palekar, Parveen Babi, Farooq Sheikh	Comedy	
Razia Sultan	Kamal Amrohi	Hema Malini, Parveen Babi, Dharmendra	Historical Drama	
Rishta Kagaz Ka	Ajay Goel	Nutan, Raj Babbar, Rati Agnihotri	Drama, Musical	
Romance	Ramanand Sagar	Poonam Dhillon, Kumar Gaurav, Shammi Kapoor	Romance	
Sadma	Balu Mahendra	Kamal Haasan, Sridevi, Gulshan Grover, Silk Smitha	Romance	
Sant Ravidas Ki Amar Kahani	Babubhai Mistri		Devotional	
Sati Naag Kanya	Babubhai Mistri	Neera, Vikram Gokhale, Manher Desai	Drama, Adventure, Action, Fantasy	
Shubh Kaamna	K. Vishwanath	Rati Agnihotri, Asrani, Utpal Dutt	Comedy, Drama	
Sookha	M.S. Sathyu	Anant Nag	Drama	
Souten	Sawan Kumar Tak	Rajesh Khanna, Padmini Kolhapure, Tina Munim, Prem Chopra, Pran	Drama	
Sun Meri Laila	Chander Bahl	Birbal, Deepika, Iftekhar	Romance	
Sweekar Kiya Maine	Zaheer D. Lari	Vinod Mehra, Shabana Azmi, Prema Narayan	Comedy, Drama	
Talabandi	Sunil Chadha	Neelam Mehra, Javed Khan, Pushpa Soni	Action	
Taqdeer	Birj	Shatrughan Sinha, Mithun Chakraborty, Hema Malini, Zeenat Aman	Action, Crime, Drama, Romance	
Tum Laut Aao	Bhimsain	Ravi Baswani, Kavita Chaudhary, Karan Razdan		
Woh Jo Hasina	Deepak Bahry	Mithun Chakraborty, Ranjeeta Kaur, Pran	Romance	
Woh Saat Din	Bapu	Anil Kapoor, Padmini Kolhapure, Naseeruddin Shah, Master Raju	Drama	
Yahan Se Shehar Ko Dekho	Mahendra Sandhu			
Zara Si Zindagi	K. Balachander	Kamal Haasan, Anita Raj, Nilu Phule	Drama, Family	
Zulf Ke Saye Saye	Anand Sagar	Rakesh Pandey, Roohi Berde		

== See also ==
- List of Hindi films of 1982
- List of Hindi films of 1984
