= Swarg Jaisaa Ghar =

Swarg Jaisaa Ghar स्वर्ग जैसा घर
- Directed by: Swaroop Kumar
- Produced by: Mehmood Nazir
- Starring: Raj Babbar; Anita Raj; Gulshan Grover
- Music by: Bappi Lahiri
- Production company: Huma Films International
- Release date: 29 November 1991
- Country: India
- Language: Hindi

Swarg Jaisaa Ghar is a 1991 family based film directed by Swaroop Kumar and produced by Mehmood Nazir.

== Plot ==
When Raj shoulders the responsibility of his step-brothers after his parents pass away, he is forced to make several sacrifices and face obstacles in life.

== Cast ==
- Raj Babbar as Raj
- Anita Raj as Savitri
- Sumeet Saigal as Kiran
- Aasif Sheikh as Amar
- Sonam as Aasha Diwan
- Swapna
- Sonu Walia as Devki
- Navin Nischol as Diwan Dinanath
- Sadashiv Amrapurkar as Sharmaji
- Gulshan Grover as Raaka
- Rakesh Bedi as Dulare
- Shiva Rindani as Chaman

== Soundtrack ==
Lyrics were written by Majrooh Sultanpuri and music was composed by Bappi Lahiri.

1. "Deewana Hoon Main" – Alka Yagnik, Kumar Sanu
2. "Aao Khele Sanam Sanam" – Mohammad Aziz, Anuradha Paudwal
3. "Dil Bechoge Haan Lelo Jee" – Kumar Sanu, Sadhna Sargam
4. "Jalta Hai Badan" – Kavita Krishnamurthy
5. "Zara Dekho Sajan" – Shabbir Kumar, Sapna Mukherjee
6. "Swarg Jaisa Ghar" – Bappi Lahiri
7. "Madhuhan (version 1)" – Bappi Lahiri
8. "Madhuhan (version 2)" – Bappi Lahiri
9. "Madhuhan (version 3)" – Bappi Lahiri
