= Karm Yudh =

Karmyudh
- Directed by: Swaroop Kumar
- Produced by: Dimpy
- Starring: Mithun Chakraborty; Anita Raj; Pran; Amrish Puri
- Music by: Bappi Lahiri
- Release date: 1 January 1985
- Running time: 130 minutes
- Country: India
- Language: Hindi

Karmyudh is a 1985 Indian Hindi-language film directed by Swaroop Kumar, starring Mithun Chakraborty, Anita Raj, Pran, and Amrish Puri.

== Story ==
The Spider Gang is active in the city. Businessman Sohanlal Puri (Amrish Puri) — later revealed to be the gang's leader, Spider — kills an honest police officer who carried out a big raid against the gang.

The cop's son grows up to be Inspector Vijay Kumar (Mithun Chakraborty), who vows to take down the gang. He is initially aided in his quest by Rakesh Saxena (Tej Sapru), who infiltrates the gang. With him is his love interest Lily (Asha Sachdev), who has also inserted herself into the upper echelons. She is motivated by her quest to find her father, whom Puri has imprisoned at some secret location.

Rakesh is killed as Puri discovers that he was feeding information to the police, prompting his sister Usha (Anita Raj) to come to the city to look for him. She initially clashes with Vijay, but they eventually join hands.

Meanwhile, Vijay manages to turn one of Puri's henchmen, Charan Singh Deol (Pran), and he becomes the cop's ally. They then set forth to dismantle the Spider Gang, despite being beset with numerous obstacles and attacks, one of which results in the death of Vijay's sister and her husband on the day of their wedding.

== Cast ==
- Mithun Chakraborty as Inspector Vijay Kumar
- Anita Raj as Usha Saxena
- Pran as Charan Singh Deol
- Amrish Puri as Sohanlal Puri
- Parveen Babi as Herself
- Asha Sachdev as Lily
- Krishan Dhawan as Albert (Lily's Father)
- Kumud Chhugani as Beena
- Bharat Kapoor as Shakti
- Tej Sapru as Rakesh Saxena (Usha's Brother)
- Dheeraj Kumar as Kundan
- Ashalata Wabgaonkar as Geeta
- Sudhir Dalvi as Inspector Bali
- Rabia Amin as Sheela
- Viju Khote as Havaldar Aayaram
- Birbal as Havaldar Gayaram
- Kamaldeep as Malkani
- Ramesh Deo as Judge
- Bob Christo as Bob
- Arun Govil as Rajesh
- Jankidas as Jankidas
- Moolchand as Heeralal
- Rajan Haksar as Sohanlal Puri's associate
- Yunus Parvez

== Soundtrack ==
Lyrics: Anjaan

Song	Singer
"Jawani Se Mile"	Asha Bhosle
"Jinka Chika"	Asha Bhosle, Amit Kumar
"Bahama Bahama"	Asha Bhosle, Mohammed Aziz
"Behna Ki Doli"	Shabbir Kumar
"Mere Dware Pe Baaraat Aayi"	Shabbir Kumar, Abhijeet, Chandrani Mukherjee
"One By One"	Sharon Prabhakar
