= Mandakini (actress) =

Indian former actress

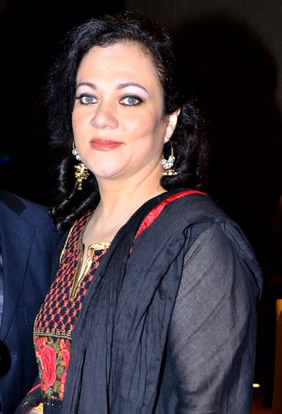
- Mandakini in 2012
- Born: Yasmeen Joseph; July 30, 1963 (age 63); Meerut, Uttar Pradesh, India
- Other name: Mandakini Joseph Thakur
- Occupation: Actress
- Years active: 1985–1996
- Notable work: Ram Teri Ganga Maili, Dance Dance, Commando, Pyar Ke Naam Qurbaan, Jeete Hain Shaan Se
- Spouse: Kagyur T. Rinpoche Thakur
- Children: 2

Yasmeen Joseph Thakur (née Joseph), professionally credited as Mandakini, is an Indian former actress. One of the leading actresses of the late 1980s, Mandakini is cited in the media as a sex symbol.

She is best remembered for her lead role in the 1985 popular film Ram Teri Ganga Maili. She has been part of many blockbusters and was credited for her on-screen chemistry with actor Mithun Chakraborty.

== Early life ==
Mandakini was born in Meerut as Yasmeen Joseph to a British father and a Himachali mother. At the young age of 16, she was discovered by film producer-director Raj Kapoor and given the screen name "Mandakini".

== Film career ==
Mandakini got her first movie in the Hindi film industry when she was cast in the lead role in the 1985 movie Ram Teri Ganga Maili by Raj Kapoor opposite his youngest son Rajiv Kapoor. The film was a blockbuster, and it earned Mandakini a Filmfare nomination as Best Actress. She caused a stir after she was seen partially nude in two sequences of the film.

She then acted in a few more successful films, such as Dance Dance with Mithun Chakraborty, Kahan Hai Kanoon with Aditya Pancholi and Pyaar Karke Dekho with Govinda, but could not recreate the success of her first movie. The actress decided to bid adieu to the Bollywood industry after her 1996 film Zordaar.

== Personal life ==
Mandakini married a former Buddhist monk, Dr. Kagyur T. Rinpoche Thakur, and embraced Buddhism. Her husband had gained fame in childhood as the baby featured in Murphy Radio advertisements in the 1970s and 1980s. The couple have a son named Rabbil and a daughter Rabze Innaya. After embracing Buddhism and becoming a follower of the Dalai Lama, Mandakini started running classes in Tibetan yoga, while her husband runs a Tibetan Herbal Centre.

== Filmography ==
Year	Title	Role	Other notes
1985	Mera Saathi	Shanti	
1985	Ram Teri Ganga Maili	Ganga	
1986	Simhasanam/Singhasan	Visha Kanya	Bilingual film; Simultaneously shot in Telugu and Hindi
1986	Om		Unreleased
1986	Jeeva	Nalini	
1986	Aag Aur Shola	Usha	
1986	Jaal	Madhu	
1986	Mazloom	Meena	
1987	Apne Apne	Ila	
1987	Loha	Seema	
1987	Pyaar Karke Dekho	Urvashi	
1987	Bhargava Ramudu	Roja	Telugu
1987	Dance Dance	Janita	
1987	Hawalaat	Leela	
1987	Param Dharam	Bijli	
1988	Pyaar Mohabbat		
1988	Jeete Hain Shaan Se	Julie	
1988	Shoorveer	Meena	
1988	Commando	Asha Malhotra	
1988	Hum To Chale Pardes		
1988	Maar Dhaad		
1988	Maalamaal	Honey	
1988	Tezaab	Nikita (special appearance)	
1988	Agnee	Ayushi	
1989	Naag Nagin	Ichchadhari Nagin Chandni	
1989	Kahan Hai Kanoon		
1989	Aakhri Baazi	Rita	
1989	Jung Baaz	Sangeeta Mathur/Neena Ninjo	
1989	Na-Insaafi	Kamli	
1989	Hisaab Khoon Ka	Preet K. Kaushal	
1989	Desh Ke Dushman	Anita Madan	
1989	Ladaai	Geeta Verma	
1990	Sheshnaag		
1990	Shandaar	Anita Chaurasia	
1990	Naya Khoon	Dr. Seema	
1990	Jaan-E-Wafa		
1990	Dushman	Laxmi	
1990	Pyar Ke Naam Qurbaan	Gauri	
1990	Taqdeer Ka Tamasha	Rajni	
1990	Andha Bichar	Special	Bengali film
1991	Antarer Bhalobasha	Jhilik	Bengali film
1991	Deshwasi	Maryada Shivpal Singh	
1992	Pyaar Ka Saudagar	Shalini Arun Verma	
1992	Naach Govinda Naach		
1993	Mayadari Mosagadu		Telugu film
1996	Zordaar	Neha	
