= Prem Granth =

- Film poster
- Directed by: Rajiv Kapoor
- Written by: Jainendra Jain
- Based on: Tess of the d'Urbervilles by Thomas Hardy
- Produced by: Randhir Kapoor; Rishi Kapoor; Rajiv Kapoor
- Starring: Shammi Kapoor; Rishi Kapoor; Madhuri Dixit; Anupam Kher
- Cinematography: Jal Mistry
- Edited by: Rajiv Kapoor
- Music by: Laxmikant–Pyarelal
- Production company: R. K. Films
- Distributed by: Filmkraft
- Release date: 24 May 1996
- Running time: 156 minutes
- Language: Hindi

Prem Granth (transl. Scripture of love) is an Indian Hindi-language film which was released in India on 24 May 1996. Directed by Rajiv Kapoor, the film stars Rishi Kapoor and Madhuri Dixit and deals with the subject of rape. It serves as an adaptation of Thomas Hardy's English novel Tess of the d'Urbervilles.

== Plot ==
Somen, a lawyer and son of head priest Swami Dharam Bhushan Maharaj, has a strong character and courage of conviction. He believes in equality and freedom and often confronts his father on issues of social justice and religion. He especially disapproves of Kedar Nath, who uses his father's clout to exploit the treasury in the temple. His uncle Nandlal owns a prosperous dairy farm and keeps himself away from the affairs of religion and social obligations, citing them as unjust and outdated.

Somen meets a beautiful young woman, Kajri, at the annual festival and is immediately drawn towards her despite her lower caste status, and they fall in love. They part unexpectedly, leaving the fire of love burning in Somen. He strives to find Kajri, but in vain. Kajri and her father, Baliram, are on their way back to their village, Bansipura, where, en route, Kajri is kidnapped and forcefully raped by a mysterious drunkard, leaving Kajri pregnant. Kajri's mother's sister wants to marry her to a shoemaker, but Kajri secretly leaves the village and gives birth. She begs for food so her breasts will become full of milk and her child can survive. But the baby dies, and Kajri meets Swami Dharam Bhushan to cremate the child, but he refuses. Kajri buries the baby.

A year passes, and they meet again. Somen finds Kajri working at his uncle Nandlal's farm, and his love blossoms. He tries to express his love towards her, but she remains evasive despite loving him. She writes a letter to explain to Somen that she was an unwed mother and unjustly ostracized from her society. But Somen does not read the letter. Meanwhile, Kedarnath burns a woman alive since she wanted to file a case against a powerful man named Roop Sahai, who is also his friend.

Kajri and Somen are engaged in Nandlal's dairy farm, but Dharam Bhushan arrives and reveals that a tearful Kajri asked him to cremate her dead child despite not knowing the child's father's name. Somen then leaves, Kajri goes back to her village, upset, Nandlal reveals that it was not her fault, showing him the letter. Kajri's aunt, Natho, reveals that the man who raped Kajri is Roop Sahai, who also raped her in the past.

Kajri goes to Shreepur and informs Somen that Roop Sahai is the rapist. Kajri, Somen, and Baliram then burn Roop Sahai and Kedarnath on Dusshera, and Somen marries Kajri.

== Cast ==
- Shammi Kapoor as Nandlal
- Rishi Kapoor as Somen
- Madhuri Dixit as Kajri
- Anupam Kher as Swami Dharam Bhooshan
- Om Puri as Baliram
- Prem Chopra as Kedar Nath
- Reema Lagoo as Parvati
- Himani Shivpuri as Natho
- Sulabha Arya as Laxmi
- Govind Namdeo as Roop Sahai

== Soundtrack ==
#	Title	Singer(s)	Raga
1	"Jungle Mein Sher"	Alka Yagnik, Vinod Rathod	
2	"Dil Dene Ki Rut"	Alka Yagnik, Vinod Rathod	Bairagi (raga)
3	"Is Duniya Men Prem Granth"	Alka Yagnik, Vinod Rathod	
4	"Bajoo Bandh"	Alka Yagnik, Suresh Wadkar	
5	"Main Kamjor Aurat"	Lata Mangeshkar	
6	"Teri Kasam Main Hoon"	Vinod Rathod	
