= Agnee (1988 film) =

- Promotional poster
- Directed by: J Om Prakash
- Produced by: J Om Prakash
- Starring: Mithun Chakraborty; Chunky Panday; Amrita Singh; Mandakini; Moushumi Chatterjee; Anupam Kher; Alok Nath
- Music by: Laxmikant–Pyarelal
- Release date: 18 November 1988
- Running time: 135 minutes
- Language: Hindi

Agnee is a 1988 Indian Hindi-language film directed and produced by J Om Prakash, starring Mithun Chakraborty, Chunky Panday, Amrita Singh, Mandakini, Moushumi Chatterjee, Anupam Kher and Alok Nath.

== Plot ==
Given up for dead, separated from his beloved wife Sonali, Pramod returns to his home town, only to see the funeral of his wife. Pramod is the victim of Sekhawat who had plotted his murder to get his share of the inheritance. In the following years, Amit grows up in a decent and cultured family and becomes a doctor. Amit and Babla, Sekhawat's son are good friends. One day Pramod takes shelter in Amit's place and there he discovers that Amit is his own son. Pramod is burning for revenge but he is reluctant to involve his son. But fate conspires to make Amit realize that his father has suffered for 25 years. On the other hand, Sekhawat kidnaps Tara, the lover of Amit and tries to molest her, but at that time Sekhawat's wife kills her husband and then herself. Everything ends happily for everyone.

== Cast ==
- Mithun Chakraborty as Amit
- Amrita Singh as Tara
- Anupam Kher as Shekawat
- Tanuja as Amit's foster mother
- Chunky Panday as Babla
- Mandakini as Aayushi
- Moushmi Chatterjee as Shobha
- Asrani as Bhimsen
- Satyen Kappu as Tara's father
- Kiran Kumar as Sheru Menghi
- Anjana Mumtaz as Sonali
- Shafi Inamdar as Amit's foster father
- Rajesh Puri as Kishorilal
- Alok Nath as Pramod
- Sudhir Dalvi as Pandit
- Jamuna as Roopa
- Mukri
- Master Sharan Chopra as Sunny

== Soundtrack ==
#	Title	Singer(s)
1	"Mil Gaye Dil"	Mohammed Aziz, Alka Yagnik
2	"Bichhoo Lad Jayega"	Alka Yagnik
3	"Mere Krishna Murari Aa"	Anup Jalota
4	"Kahan Laya Mera Yaar"	Suresh Wadkar, Alka Yagnik
5	"O Aayee Baisakhi"	Mohammed Aziz, Alka Yagnik, Suresh Wadkar, Uttara Kelkar
