= Aa Ab Laut Chalen =

1999 Indian film

- DVD cover
- Directed by: Rishi Kapoor
- Written by: Rumi Jaffrey; Raju Saigal
- Screenplay by: Sachin Bhowmick
- Produced by: Rajiv Kapoor; Randhir Kapoor; Rishi Kapoor
- Starring: Akshaye Khanna; Aishwarya Rai; Rajesh Khanna; Paresh Rawal; Suman Ranganathan
- Cinematography: Sameer Arya
- Edited by: Rajiv Kapoor
- Music by: Nadeem-Shravan
- Production company: R.K. Films
- Release date: 22 January 1999
- Running time: 178 minutes
- Country: India
- Language: Hindi
- Budget: ₹9 crore
- Box office: ₹20.54 crore

Aa Ab Laut Chalen (translation: Come, let's go back) is a 1999 Indian Hindi-language romantic drama film directed by Rishi Kapoor in his first and only directorial. The film stars Akshaye Khanna, Aishwarya Rai and Rajesh Khanna in lead roles. It was released on 22 January 1999.

== Plot ==
Rohan Khanna is a jobless graduate living in India with his mother. Ranjit, a former neighbour who now runs a hotel in the United States with his American wife, suggests that Rohan should move to America and Rohan eagerly accepts. His mother disapproves because the notion brings back bitter memories of his father Balraj abandoning the family to move to America, where he died.

Rohan makes the journey anyway. At the New York airport, Rohan befriends Sardar Khan, a Pakistani taxi driver. Sardar drops Rohan at Ranjit's hotel. Rohan discovers that Ranjit and his wife mistreat his parents and use the hotel for prostitution. Rohan confronts Ranjit about this and is told to leave.

Sardar rooms with another cab driver, a Punjabi man from India, Iqbal Singh, and they offer Rohan a place to stay and a job. While working, Rohan meets a young Indian woman, Pooja. They become friends and eventually Pooja develops feeling for Rohan.

Rohan asks Pooja to move in with him. Sardar Khan helps the couple to find jobs, but they don't pay well. Despite his hard work, Rohan has earned little money and has only four months left on his visa. On the advice of friends, Rohan decides to obtain citizenship by engaging in a green card marriage. Rohan and Pooja meet the seductive and wealthy Loveleen, who agrees to the false marriage. After the marriage planning, Rohan becomes completely wrapped up in Loveleen, abandoning his friends and Pooja to move into Loveleen's mansion.

Pooja finds a job as a caretaker for a rich Indian man, Balraj, who is elderly and very ill. Unbeknownst to her, Balraj is Rohan's father and is not dead after all. Balraj has a son, Karan, who is spoiled and arrogant. Karan is often intimidated by Vikram, an associate of a dangerous drug dealer Marco who uses him as a courier to ship drugs in and around America in exchange for paying off his debts for his luxuries. Balraj starts to think of Pooja as a daughter and asks her to consider marrying Karan. Karan looks at this as an opportunity to get more money from his father so that he can pay off Marco's debts.

Rohan gets tired of Loveleen, realizing he is in love with Pooja. He goes back to his friends, who tell him where to find her. He begs for her forgiveness and asks her to return to India to marry him. Pooja agrees, and Rohan gives her a locket with a picture of his mother. Pooja tells this to Balraj, who encourages her, without realizing that Rohan is his son.

Karan has become interested in Pooja and tries to intimidate her into marrying him. After a confrontation with him, her locket breaks. Balraj is surprised to find his wife's photo when he looks inside. When Pooja explains that Rohan gave it to her, Balraj realizes that Rohan must be his son. He fears that Rohan might hate him, so he does not tell Pooja.

After hearing from Pooja that Rohan is struggling to make ends meet, Balraj asks Pooja to call Rohan to interview at his company. A grateful Rohan is offered a well-paying career and cash bonuses from the generous Balraj. Rohan uses his newfound wealth to pay for the care of Ranjit's parents. He also has Ranjit and his wife arrested for illegally possessing Ranjit's parents' passports and for their prostitution activities.

After some time, Pooja and Rohan decide to return to India. Before they leave, Balraj confesses to Rohan that he is his estranged father and explains why he never returned. Rohan is angry at first, but after his mother forgives Balraj over the phone, Rohan decides to as well. Karan gets to know about it and decides to retaliate by physically attacking him only to be interrupted by Rohan who has taken his father's side. Balraj disowns Karan and hands over the majority of his wealth to him. Balraj, Rohan and Pooja decided to head back to India. At the airport, they are surprised to see Karan along with NYPD officer Jack Patel who has turned a new leaf by getting Marco and his gang arrested and is officially pardoned by the law. Karan discards his wealthy status and also joins them in India, thus reuniting a broken family.

== Cast ==
- Rajesh Khanna as Balraj Khanna, Rohan's father
- Akshaye Khanna as Rohan Khanna
- Aishwarya Rai as Pooja Walia, Rohan's love interest
- Moushumi Chatterjee as Rama Khanna, Rohan's mother
- Navin Nischol as Dr. Ashwin Khurana
- Suman Ranganathan as Loveleen, Rohan’s girlfriend
- Kader Khan as Sardar Khan
- Paresh Rawal as Pandit Jai Kishan Patel / PC Jack Patel
- Satish Kaushik as Chaurasia
- Jaspal Bhatti as Iqbal Singh
- Vivek Vaswani as Vaswani
- Himani Shivpuri as Mrs. Chaurasia
- Alok Nath as Rohan's grandfather
- Aditya Hitkari as Karan Khanna, Rohan's half-brother
- Jatin Sial as Ranjit Kapoor aka Ronnie Cooper
- Vishwajeet Pradhan as Drug Dealer Vikram “Marco's Agent”
- Sulbha Arya Swarno Kapoor, Ranjit's mom
- Achyut Potdar as Lekh Kapoor, Ranjit's father

== Music ==
The music of this movie was composed by Nadeem–Shravan and the lyrics were written by Sameer. It was released on the label Saregama. The soundtrack was quite popular upon its release. All songs were popular among the masses.

#	Title	Singer(s)
1.	"Aa Ab Laut Chalen"	Udit Narayan, Alka Yagnik
2.	"O Yaaro Maaf Karna"	Kumar Sanu, Sonu Nigam, Abhijeet, Shabbir Kumar, Alka Yagnik, Vijeyta Pandit, Saud Khan
3.	"Mera Dil Tera Deewana"	Alka Yagnik
4.	"Tere Bin Ek Pal"	Udit Narayan, Jaspinder Narula
5.	"Yehi Hai Pyar"	Udit Narayan, Alka Yagnik, Jaspinder Narula
6.	"Yeh Kaisi Mulaqat Hai"	Kumar Sanu, Alka Yagnik
7.	"O Yaaro Maaf Karna" (Sad)	Kumar Sanu, Alka Yagnik
8.	"Otashi Anata"	Jaspinder Narula, Bali Brahmbhatt

== Reception ==
Suparn Verma of Rediff noted, "Maybe Rishi Kapoor was bowing to RK tradition, maybe he was trying to follow his heart, but he just has to get back to the drawing board and seriously plan that next venture". Priya Ramani of India Today wrote, ″Alas, this brave attempt at perfection is drowned in a sea of stereotypical characters and clichéd dialogues by Rumi Jaffrey. Women with curly hair are either spoiled rotten or scheming. The gloomy widowed mother spends her time praying and talking to her husband's portrait. And Akshaye's father-Rajesh Khanna in a comeback role minus all the charisma of his superstar days-finds his estranged family via a gold locket.″

The box office performance of the film was classified as "Below average" by Box Office India.
