= Mera Saathi =

1985 film by K. Raghavendra Rao

- Theatrical release poster
- Directed by: K. Raghavendra Rao
- Screenplay by: K. Raghavendra Rao
- Story by: M. Prabhakar Reddy
- Based on: Dharmaatmudu (Telugu)(1983)
- Produced by: K. Kesava Rao
- Starring: Jeetendra; Jaya Prada; Rajiv Kapoor; Mandakini
- Cinematography: K. S. Prakash Rao
- Edited by: Kotagiri Venkateswara Rao
- Music by: Bappi Lahiri
- Production companies: Sree Brahmarambika Films; Padmalaya Studios (Presents)
- Release date: 1985
- Running time: 141 minutes
- Country: India
- Language: Hindi

Mera Saathi (transl. My Companion) is a 1985 Hindi-language action-drama film, produced by K. Kesava Rao under the Sree Brahmarambika Films banner and directed by K. Raghavendra Rao. The film stars Jeetendra, Jaya Prada, Rajiv Kapoor, Mandakini in the pivotal roles and music was composed by Bappi Lahiri. The film is a remake of the Telugu movie Dharmaatmudu (1983).

== Plot ==
Ranga is a ruffian whose life changes upon the sudden entry of a beautiful girl, Ragini. Later, he finds out that she has fled from her home to escape from a forced marriage to a rogue, Bansi Das. Ranga gives her shelter. They fall in love and get married. Soon, Ragini reforms Ranga into an honest, hard working man and they are blessed with a girl, Shanti. Years roll by and Ranga turns into a millionaire through his hard work. Shanti falls in love with Shyam, an associate of Bansi Das. Being cognizant of it, Ranga denies to approve their relationship. Hence, Shanti marries Shyam without her father’s approval. Ranga gives his entire wealth to Shyam and leaves with Ragini. Then, Shyam is backstabbed and his property is seized by Bansi Das. Ranga courageously saves him. Finally, Shyam apologizes to Ranga and the family is reunited.

== Cast ==
- Jeetendra as Ranganath "Ranga"
- Jaya Prada as Ragini
- Rajiv Kapoor as Shyam
- Mandakini as Shanti
- Shakti Kapoor as Bansi
- Sujit Kumar as Police Inspector
- Bharat Bhushan as Gopal
- Asrani as Ram Kumar
- Aruna Irani as Ram Kumar's Adamant Play Character
- Amjad Khan as Ram Kumar's Adamant Play Character
- Sharat Saxena as Sultan
- Manik Irani as Bansi's Goon

== Soundtrack ==
Lyrics: Indeevar

Song	Singer
"Aayi Aayi Rehne Ko Tere Dil Mein"	Kishore Kumar, Lata Mangeshkar
"Sapnon Mein Kho Ja, Chupke Se So Ja"	Kishore Kumar, Asha Bhosle
"Daddy Se Tujhko Milaungi, Ghar Apne Le Jaungi"	Kishore Kumar, Asha Bhosle
"Pyar Se Pyara Tu Tu, Mera Nazara Tu Tu"	Asha Bhosle, Bappi Lahiri
"Sare Sapne Tu Tod Gayi, Daali Ko Kahin Kyun Khud Hi Chhod Gayi"	Asha Bhosle, S. P. Balasubrahmanyam
