= Prem Geet (1981 film) =

- Directed by: Sudesh Issar
- Written by: Shashi Bhushan
- Screenplay by: Shashi Bhushan
- Produced by: Pawan Kumar; Lakhan Sinha
- Starring: Raj Babbar; Anita Raj
- Cinematography: K.R. Murthy
- Edited by: Gurudutt Shiral; Waman B. Bhosle
- Music by: Jagjit Singh
- Release date: 25 September 1981
- Country: India
- Language: Hindi

Prem Geet is a 1981 Indian Hindi-language film directed by Sudesh Issar. It stars Raj Babbar and Anita Raj. This was the debut film of Anita Raj.

== Plot ==
Akash Bhardwaj (Raj Babbar) is a famous poet under the pen name Nishant, which is unknown to his father Mr. Bhardwaj (Madan Puri) and mother Mrs. Laxmi Bhardwaj (Showkar Janaki). Asha (Rajni Sharma), his sister's friend loves him, but he doesn't reciprocate her feelings.

On a college excursion to Shimla, he comes across famous dancer Shikha (Anita Raj) and falls in love with her. Unaware that he is the famous poet Nishant whom she likes, she insults him. In a party during the song "Hothon Se Chhulo Tum", she finally found out that Akash is Nishant and she confesses her love. His father, who wants to see him as a qualified doctor, doesn't approve of the relationship. His marriage is fixed with Asha against his will. Here the story takes a turn as Shikha is diagnosed with Brain Tumor in the final stage and has only few days to live. Akash asks his friend Dr. Amar (Shashi Ranjan) to hide her illness from Shikha to save her from any shock and keep her happy. He convinces his father for his marriage with Shikha, informing him about her medical condition. They are married with the initial disapproval of his mother and sister, but later everyone starts liking her.

After 3 months of marriage, symptoms start to show up as dizziness and vomiting, which Mrs. Laxmi takes for her pregnancy. Whereas the gynecologist (Shammi) asks her to go for complete checkup, she finds out about her disease. While confronting Dr. Amar, she is informed that Akash as well as his father know of this and she asks her doctor not to disclose the fact to them that she also is aware of her condition. She asks Asha to look after Akash after her death. She dies on stage while performing for a charity function on her birthday after the song "Tumne Kya Kya Kiya Hai Humare Liye", telling Akash that she knows everything and is thankful to him for all the happiness he has given her.

== Cast ==
- Raj Babbar as Akash Bhardwaj / Nishant
- Anita Raj as Shikha
- Rajni Sharma as Asha
- Sowcar Janki as Mrs. Laxmi Bhardwaj
- Madan Puri as Mr. Bhardwaj
- Shashi Ranjan as Dr. Amar
- Komal Soni
- Sajjan as Hiralal
- Shammi as Gynecologist
- Raj Kishore as Professor
- Viju Khote as Deepak Agarwal
- Vandana Rane
- Yasmeen
- Zubeda
- Chandermohan
- Kumar Gautam
- Ashok Saxena
- Sonika
- Ram Avtar as Patient (uncredited)
- Gulshan Grover as Rangeela (uncredited)

== Soundtrack ==
- Music: Jagjit Singh
- Lyrics: Indeevar

#	Title	Singer(s)
1	"Dekh Lo Awaz Dekar"	Anuradha Paudwal
2	"Dilber Jani"	Asha Bhosle
3	"Dulhe Raja"	Asha Bhosle
4	"Khwabo"	Suresh Wadkar
5	"Aao Mil Jaye"	Suresh Wadkar, Anuradha Paudwal
6	"Kitne Ahsan Kiye Tumne Humpe"	Asha Bhosle
7	"Hoton Se Chhu Lo Tum"	Jagjit Singh
