= Hum To Chale Pardes =

Indian Hindi Film

- Directed by: Ravindra Peepat
- Written by: Anees Bazmee
- Produced by: Ravindra Peepat
- Starring: Rajiv Kapoor; Shashi Kapoor; Anju Mahendru; Mandakini; Kulbhushan Kharbanda
- Edited by: Subhash Sehgal
- Music by: Vijay Singh
- Release date: 29 July 1988
- Running time: 2 hours 17 minutes
- Country: India
- Language: Hindi

Hum To Chale Pardes is a Bollywood family-drama film released in 1988. The film was directed by Ravindra Peepat and written by Anees Bazmee. The musical score was done by Vijay Singh. Starring Rajiv Kapoor, Shashi Kapoor, Anju Mahendru, Mandakini, Kulbhushan Kharbanda in leading roles, the film explores a father's unfathomable love for his only daughter and the insensitivity of the mother-in-law to the motherless girl. Sharmila Tagore and Asha Parekh had given guest appearance in the film.

== Plot ==
Kumar and Suman have been married for years but have no children. When Suman is pregnant, has a baby, but is unlikely to survive, she asks Kumar to take care of her daughter and never marry again. After Kumar promises she passes away.

Kumar named the daughter Priya and they share a strong bond between them over the years. When she reaches the marriageable age, Kumar arranges the marriage with her childhood sweetheart, London-based Ajay Mehra. The marriage took place on a condition that Ajay and his mom relocate to India and settle here.

After the marriage, Ajay refused to move to India due to various reasons which create issues between him, Priya and the rest of the family.

== Cast ==
- Shashi Kapoor as Kumar
- Rajiv Kapoor
- Mandakini as Priya
- Anju Mahendru as Kiran
- Kulbhushan Kharbanda
- Mehar Mittal
- Shiva Rindani
- Anjana Mumtaz
- Sudhir Pandey
- Meher Mittal as Kiran's Father
- Girija Shankar as Gurubachan
- Ram Sethi as Doctor Sethi
- Sharmila Tagore as Trishna (Guest appearance)
- Asha Parekh as Suman (Guest appearance)

== Release and Reception ==
The film released on 29 July 1988.

== Soundtrack ==
The film has six songs, all composed by Vijay Singh and the lyrics penned by Ravindra Peepat. The song Hum To Chale Pardes was a big rage. The other songs were also quite popular.

No.	Title	Lyrics	Music	Singer	Length
1.	"Hum To Chale Pardes (Happy)"	Ravindra Peepat	Vijay Singh	Lata Mangeshkar	08.03
2.	"Bichadna Tha Hame"	Ravindra Peepat	Vijay Singh	Lata Mangeshkar	08.09
3.	"Chand Ne Kholi Jadu Ki Pudiya"	Ravindra Peepat	Vijay Singh	Purnima Patwardhan, Mohammed Aziz	06.25
4.	"Hum To Chale Pardes (Sad)"	Ravindra Peepat	Vijay Singh	Lata Mangeshkar	02.39
5.	"Mil Gaye Hum Aur Tum"	Ravindra Peepat	Vijay Singh	Shabbir Kumar, Asha Bhosle	07.48
6.	"Sote Sote Raat Soyi"	Ravindra Peepat	Vijay Singh	Anupama Deshpande, Manmohan Singh	06.38
Total length:					39.42
