= Dharam Sankat =

- Directed by: N.D. Kothari
- Written by: Achala Nagar
- Produced by: Umesh N. Kothari
- Starring: Vinod Khanna; Amrita Singh; Dara Singh; Amrish Puri
- Cinematography: W.B. Rao
- Music by: Kalyanji Anandji
- Release date: 6 September 1991 (India)
- Country: India
- Language: Hindi

Dharam Sankat is a 1991 Indian Hindi-language Action drama film directed by N.D. Kothari and produced by Umesh N. Kothari. It stars Vinod Khanna and Amrita Singh in pivotal roles.

== Cast ==
- Vinod Khanna as Birju
- Amrita Singh as Madhu
- Dara Singh as Daaku Dara Singh (Birju's Father)
- Rohini Hattangadi as Durga Devi (Birju's Mother)
- Amrish Puri as Jagira
- Raj Babbar as Police Officer Gopal
- Shakti Kapoor as Insp. Heeralal
- Asrani as Const. Pannalal
- Sahila Chaddha as Sohn Kanwar

== Soundtrack ==
#	Title	Singer(s)
1	"Chhoti Mirch Badi Tej Balma"	Alka Yagnik
2	"Enam Maro Deti Ja"	Kumar Sanu, Sonali Vajpayee
3	"Hum Tum Kahan Nahin Hai"	Manhar Udhas, Sadhana Sargam
4	"Kar Lo Itne Bulund"	Mohammed Aziz, Alka Yagnik, Sadhana Sargam
5	"Nathaniya Main Na Pehnoon"	Sapna Mukherjee
