= Din Dahade =

1990 Bollywood film by Mohan Segal

- Directed by: Yash Chauhan
- Produced by: Aman Batla
- Starring: Sunil Puri; Kamran Rizvi
- Music by: Jeetu-Tapan
- Release date: 3 August 1990
- Country: India
- Language: Hindi

Din Dahade is a 1990 Bollywood film directed by Yash Chauhan, starring Sunil Puri, Kamran Rizvi, Sriprada, Ajit Vachani, Vikram Gokhale, Goga Kapoor, Aloknath, Anil Kochar and Kunika.

== Soundtrack ==
Song	Singer
"Din Dahade"	Kumar Sanu
"Ladi Ladi Ladi Ladi"	Kumar Sanu, Asha Bhosle
"Ganpati Bappa"	Kumar Sanu, Suresh Wadkar
"Jeena Jeena Hai"	Bhupinder Singh
"Jaam Piyo Ji"	Kavita Krishnamurthy
