= Zordaar =

- Promotional Poster
- Directed by: Ajay Kashyap
- Starring: Govinda; Aditya Pancholi; Mandakini; Neelam
- Music by: Anu Malik; Abu Malik; Krish Malik
- Release date: 11 October 1996
- Country: India
- Language: Hindi

Zordaar is a 1996 Indian Hindi-language film directed by Ajay Kashyap. It stars Govinda, Aditya Pancholi, Mandakini, Neelam in pivotal roles. The film was completed in 1988 but its release was delayed until 1996. It was the final film appearance of actress Mandakini before she retired from acting to focus on her family.

== Plot ==
Three top criminals — Devil, Fox, and Jackal — are given a gold medal for their bad deeds. They unveil their enterprise, where they import and transport explosives in children's toys.

Elsewhere, an unemployed Ravi foils an assassination attempt and intercepts the trio's stuff. He just happens to be the son of Jackal's trusted but clueless employee Rana.

Rana and his friend stumble upon Jackal's skullduggery and are about to turn him in to the police when the friend's son Shiva intervenes. Jackal and his friends kill all three, or so they think. They also frame the friend and his son Shiva in a terrorism case, insinuating that the duo killed Rana when he intervened.

Shiva survives, assumes the name Tony, and approaches Ravi to join hands to avenge their kin's death. Is the partnership forged? That's the story of the film.

== Cast ==
- Govinda as Ravi
- Aditya Pancholi as Shiva / Tony
- Mandakini as Neha
- Neelam as Anju Sharma
- Gulshan Grover as Devil
- Kiran Kumar as Fox
- Aloknath as Sanga
- Shafi Inamdar as ACP Sharma
- Raza Murad as Superintendent of Police Singh and Neha's father
- Daboo Malik as Sudhir
- Bob Christo as Sir John
- Mahesh Anand as Jackal
- Abhi Bhattacharya as Master Shekhar
- Vikas Anand as Rana
- Ashalatha as Sudha, Rana's wife and Ravi's mother
- Anjana Mumtaz as Vinita, Shiva's mother

== Soundtrack ==
Available on T-Series on LP, CD, Cassette and Digital Download. The song "Hum Sabko Salaam Karte Hain" was taken from the self-titled 1986 pop album by Anu Malik, Abbu Malik and Krish Malik.

No.	Title	Lyrics	Singer(s)	Length
1.	"Ganpati Bappa Morya"	Indeevar	Anu Malik, Sadhana Sargam
2.	"Hum Sabko Salaam Karte Hain"	Sameer Anjaan	Anu Malik, Abbu Malik, Krish Malik
3.	"Ae Babu Ae Babu"	Indeevar	Sadhana Sargam
4.	"Russi Na Amriki"	Shaily Shailendra	Anu Malik, Sadhna Sargam, Krish Malik
5.	"Main Hoon Awara"	Hasrat Jaipuri	Abbu Malik, Anupama Deshpande
6.	"Dushman Kya Marega Humko"	Shaily Shailendra	Anu Malik, Abbu Malik, Krish Malik
7.	"Kaali Aankhen Miss India"	Hasrat Jaipuri	Anu Malik
