= Hum Se Na Takrana =

- DVD cover
- Directed by: Deepak Bahry
- Produced by: Deepak Bahry
- Starring: Dharmendra; Shatrughan Sinha; Mithun Chakraborty; Anita Raj; Kimi Katkar
- Music by: Laxmikant–Pyarelal
- Release date: 1 June 1990
- Running time: 145 minutes
- Country: India
- Language: Hindi

Hum Se Na Takrana is a 1990 Indian Hindi-language action film produced and directed by Deepak Bahry. The film stars Dharmendra, Shatrughan Sinha, Mithun Chakraborty, Anita Raj, Kimi Katkar in lead roles.

The film faced a delay of 4–5 years before getting released on 1 June 1990. Upon release, it received mixed reviews from critics and was a commercial success, becoming the 7th highest-grossing film of 1990.

== Plot ==
The film portrays a young farmer losing all his land through a forged contract.

== Cast ==
- Dharmendra as Amar
- Shatrughan Sinha as Badshah
- Mithun Chakraborty as Inspector Vijay
- Anita Raj as Sundari
- Kimi Katkar as Bade Thakur's Daughter
- Aruna Irani as Chand Bibi
- Dinesh Thakur as Bhola / Jwala Singh
- Rohini Hattangadi as Ganga
- Ranjeet as Shamsher
- Sharat Saxena as Ranveer
- Raza Murad as Chhote Thakur / Judge Prithvi
- Om Shivpuri as Bade Thakur
- Jagdeep as Chhote Babu
- Huma Khan as Dancer / Singer
- Leena Das as Dancer / Singer

== Soundtrack ==
Song	Singer
"Mera Pyar Hai"	Kavita Krishnamurthy
"Iska Naam Jawani Hai"	Kavita Krishnamurthy, Mohammed Aziz
"Sun O Mere Humjoli"	Kavita Krishnamurthy, Mohammed Aziz
"Dekho Hum Se Na Takrana"	Mohammed Aziz, Shailendra Singh
"Mata Tere Dar Pe Aaye Sawaali"	Nitin Mukesh, Shabbir Kumar, Kavita Krishnamurthy, Shailendra Singh
"Jitne Ghungroo Jadhe Hai"	Kavita Krishnamurthy, Anupama Deshpande
