= Pyaar Mohabbat =

- Directed by: Ajay Kashyap
- Produced by: M.M.C. Cooper
- Starring: Govinda; Mandakini; Raakhee; Shakti Kapoor; Kader Khan
- Music by: Laxmikant–Pyarelal
- Distributed by: Marco Enterprises
- Release date: 27 May 1988
- Country: India
- Language: Hindi

Pyaar Mohabbat is a 1988 Indian film directed by Ajay Kashyap and produced by M.M.C. Cooper. It is filmed in the Western-style targeted for an Indian audience.

== Plot ==
Janki Devi, a young widow with a son, Anil, and a daughter, Aarti, toils throughout the day to provide her children with a proper education. However, the evil Thakur has his eye on her and tries to molest her. Unable to bear this sight, Anil kills the Thakur. Janki Devi forces her son to run away and takes the blame upon herself. Anil runs away, meets with an accident, and loses his memory. Janki Devi is released by the court and given shelter by her brother, but she must endure constant torture from her sister-in-law. After nearly twenty years of hard work in a factory during the day and at her brother’s house at night, Janki’s daughter has grown up. Anil, now known as Ravi after being raised in an orphanage, has become an engineer working in the same factory where his mother is a laborer. Shakti Singh, the son of Thakur, is the manager of Dhaniram Estates. The owner of Dhaniram has a beautiful daughter, Nisha, who is attracted to Ravi. When Shakti sees that Nisha is slipping out of his grasp, he calls his partner Maniram from Hyderabad. Maniram is Dhaniram’s twin brother but they are polar opposites in character. Maniram and Shakti Singh create obstacles to separate the young lovers and fate involves Aarti and Janki as well. Ultimately, good triumphs over evil and the long-lost family is reunited.

== Cast ==
- Govinda as Ravi
- Mandakini as Nisha
- Raakhee as Ramvati
- Bindu
- Shakti Kapoor as Chaudhary Gulab Rai
- Kader Khan as Seth Dhaniram

== Soundtrack ==
#	Title	Singer(s)
1	"Goli Andar Dam Bahar"	Kishore Kumar, Laxmikant, Mehmood
2	"Dil Ki Kalam Se"	Shabbir Kumar, Kavita Krishnamurthy
3	"Ek Maa Ek Munna"	Shabbir Kumar, Kavita Krishnamurthy, Sapna Mukherjee
4	"Aise Na Dekh Mujhe"	Mahesh Kumar, Alka Yagnik
5	"Tina Ke Mina"	Mohammed Aziz, Kavita Krishnamurthy
