= Mazloom =

- Theatrical poster
- Directed by: C.P. Dixit
- Written by: S. M. Abbas
- Produced by: Ranjit Virk
- Starring: Anita Raj; Suresh Oberoi; Mandakini; Aman Virk; Arjun; Shakti Kapoor
- Cinematography: Munir Khan
- Edited by: Deepak Pal
- Music by: Laxmikant–Pyarelal
- Release date: 19 September 1986
- Country: India
- Language: Hindi

Mazloom (meaning: ill treated) is a 1986 Indian Hindi-language crime drama film directed by C.P. Dixit and produced by Ranjit Virk, starring Suresh Oberoi, Anita Raj and Mandakini in lead roles.

== Plot summary ==
Purnima is raped by a stranger (Shakti Kapoor) in a train and is ashamed to talk of the incident. She becomes pregnant and her parents find out. Her father (Pinchoo Kapoor) dies of shock upon hearing this. It is too late to abort the baby, and she gives birth to a boy whom her mother gives away to a stranger.

A few days later, Purnima marries Vijay (Suresh Oberoi), but ironically the same child ends up in their care, and they name him Rajan (Arjun).

Years later, Purnima gives birth to another child, named Aman. The two boys grow up, and sibling rivalry prevails to such an extent that they eventually fall in love with the same woman, Meena (Mandakini). Things become increasingly complicated and one member of their family is killed, and another, arrested.

== Cast ==
- Suresh Oberoi as Vijay Singh
- Anita Raj as Purnima Singh
- Pinchoo Kapoor as Raj Bahadur Arjun Singh (Purnima's father)
- Veena as Purnima's mother
- Arjun as Rajan Vijay Singh
- Aman Virk as Aman Vijay Singh
- Mandakini as Meena
- Shakti Kapoor as Advocate Rakesh (rapist)
- Shobha Khote as Mrs. Khan
- Yunus Parvez as Mr. Khan
- Rajesh Puri as Sher Ali
- Jayshree T. as Mrs. Sher Ali (Laila)
- Parikshat Sahni as Judge Jaspal
- Heena Kausar as Neelam Jaspal, sister of Vijay Singh
- Goga Kapoor as Prosecuting Attorney Randhir Mehra
- Birbal as Clerk Karan

== Songs ==
The songs in the soundtrack are written by S.H. Bihari and Santosh Anand.

1. "Pyar Ka Farz Nibhane Ke Liye Aaye Hai" - Mohammed Aziz
2. "Sunday Monday Tuesday Wednesday Thursday" - Anuradha Paudwal, Mohammed Aziz
3. "Aa Kareeb Aao Na Yun Dor Dor Jao" - Suresh Wadkar
4. "Aankh Pe Dhoop Ka Chashma Or Sar Par Ghatye Kali" - Shabbir Kumar
5. "Kal Hamare Ghar Teri Baarat Ayegi, Or Kya Kya Hoga Jab Woh Raat Aaygi" - Anuradha Paudwal, Mohammed Aziz
6. "Kal Ho Na Ho Jahan Me Ye Chand Ye Sitare" - Suresh Wadkar, Kavita Krishnamurthy
