= Zulm Ka Badla =

1985 Hindi action film

- Directed by: K. Prasad
- Produced by: Swaran Singh
- Starring: Rakesh Roshan; Anita Raj; Danny Denzongpa; Shakti Kapoor
- Music by: Sonik-Omi
- Release date: 14 June 1985
- Country: India
- Language: Hindi

Zulm Ka Badla is a 1985 Hindi Bollywood crime action film, directed by K. Prasad and produced by Swaran Singh Kanwar. The film was released in 1985 under the banner of Swarn Films.

== Cast ==
- Rakesh Roshan as Inspector Anil Verma
- Anita Raj as Geeta Verma / Mrs. D'Sa
- Danny Denzongpa as Bunty / Shambhu
- Shakti Kapoor as Jagdish Kumar "J.K." / Sangram Singh (Double Role)
- Jagdish Raj as Inspector / DIG Verma
- Neelam Mehra as Bijili
- Chandrashekhar as Colonel Rajesh
- Dinesh Hingoo
- Manik Irani as Goonda
- Jagdeep
- Rajan Haksar as Pinto
- Harmail Pannu as Rana
- Ramesh Goyal as Inspector

== Soundtrack ==
Song	Singer
"Hai Allah Nigahbaan"	Asha Bhosle
"Mumbai Cha Tu Maharaja"	Asha Bhosle
"Pehle Kabhi Yeh Mausam Na Tha Itna Suhana"	Asha Bhosle, Mohammed Rafi
"Yeh Umar, Yeh Mizaaj, Khuda Khair Kare"	Mahendra Kapoor, Parveen Saba
"Sun Baliye, Ni Baliye, Ni Baliye"	Chandrani Mukherjee, Omi
