= Zimmedaaar =

Zimmedaaar जिम्मेदार
- Directed by: Santosh Kumar Chauhan
- Produced by: Santosh Kumar Chauhan
- Starring: Rajiv Kapoor; Kimi Katkar; Anita Raj
- Cinematography: S. Pappu
- Edited by: Mukhtar Ahmed
- Music by: Anu Malik
- Release date: 1990
- Country: India
- Language: Hindi

Zimmedaaar is a 1990 Indian Hindi-language drama film directed and produced by Santosh Kumar Chauhan. The film stars Rajiv Kapoor, Kimi Katkar and Anita Raj in pivotal roles. After this movie, Rajiv Kapoor did not feature in any films for over thirty years. This was also his last film to be released when he was alive. His final film, Toolsidas Junior (2022) was released posthumously a year after Kapoor died in February 2021.

== Cast ==
- Rajiv Kapoor as Inspector Rajiv
- Kimi Katkar as Tina
- Anita Raj as Anita
- Ranjeet as Ranjeet Singh
- Vinod Mehra as Inspector Prakash Verma
- Biswajeet as Chief Inspector Shekhar Singh
- Rajendranath as Press Editor Popatlal
- Dinesh Hingoo as Cameo Appearance
- Tom Alter as Mercus
- Bhushan Tiwari as Goga
- Tej Sapru as Jagpal
- Viju Khote as Viju
- Narendranath as Sudama
- Bob Christo as Bob
- Mac Mohan as Mac
- Sudhir as Raghu
- Manik Irani as Indian Army Soldier

== Music ==
Song	Singer
"O Naazneen O Haseena O Mehjabeen O Dilruba"	Shabbir Kumar
"Nazar Bacha Bachake Chal"	Shabbir Kumar, Munmi Borah
"Pehle Hafte Mein"	Shabbir Kumar, Anuradha Paudwal
"O Dekho Arey Dekho"	Shabbir Kumar, Anuradha Paudwal
"Dilbar Dil Leke Dil De Do"	Shabbir Kumar, Asha Bhosle
