= Naag Nagin =

- Directed by: Ramkumar Bohra
- Starring: Rajiv Kapoor; Mandakini
- Music by: Laxmikant–Pyarelal
- Release date: 1990
- Country: India
- Language: Hindi

Naag Nagin is a 1990 Bollywood film directed by Ramkumar Bohra and starring Rajiv Kapoor, Mandakini, Raza Murad and Vijayta Pandit.

== Soundtrack ==
1. "Aa Mere Pyar Meri Zindagi Mein Aa" - Shabbir Kumar, Anuradha Paudwal
2. "Bhagwan Tujhe Aana Hi Padega" - Anuradha Paudwal
3. "Mehfil Mein Mujhko Dekh Kar Tumne" - Anupama Deshpande
4. "Naag Nagin" (Music)
5. "Tu Naag Main Nagin" - Kavita Krishnamurthy, Nitin Mukesh
6. "Tu Naag Main Nagin v2" - Kavita Krishnamurthy, Nitin Mukesh
7. "Tu Naag Main Nagin v3" - Kavita Krishnamurthy, Nitin Mukesh
8. "Tu Naag Main Nagin v4" - Kavita Krishnamurthy, Nitin Mukesh
9. "Tu Naag Main Nagin v5" - Kavita Krishnamurthy, Nitin Mukesh
10. "Tu Naag Main Nagin v6" - Kavita Krishnamurthy, Nitin Mukesh
