= Sadhu Sant =

1991 Hindi Indian film

- Directed by: Prakash Mehra
- Produced by: Shakuntala
- Starring: Amitabh Bachchan; Mithun Chakraborty; Hema Malini; Suresh Oberoi; Amrita Singh
- Music by: Laxmikant–Pyarelal
- Release date: 1991
- Country: India
- Language: Hindi

Sadhu Sant is a 1991 Hindi Indian film announced, starring Amitabh Bachchan and Mithun Chakraborty. The film was much awaited, but never graced theatres.

== Plot ==
Sadhu Sant was a much awaited film starring Amitabh Bachchan and Mithun Chakraborty, But the film was shelved due to creative differences.

== Cast ==
- Amitabh Bachchan as Ravi Singh
- Mithun Chakraborty as Samar Kumar
- Hema Malini as Priya Khanna
- Suresh Oberoi as Vinay Kakkar
- Amrita Singh as Meena Kapoor
- Amrish Puri
