= Dushman (1990 film) =

- Directed by: Shakti Samanta
- Screenplay by: Shakti Samanta; Ranjan Bose
- Dialogues by: Shakti Samanta; Pradip Roy Chowdhury
- Story by: Shaktipada Rajguru
- Produced by: Shakti Samanta
- Starring: Mithun Chakraborty; Mandakini; Alok Nath; Sadashiv Amrapurkar; Tanuja; Deepa Sahi; Biplab Chatterjee; Ranjeet
- Cinematography: Nandu Bhattacharya
- Edited by: Sudheer Verma
- Music by: R. D. Burman
- Production company: Shakti Films
- Distributed by: Shakti Films
- Release dates: 28 February 1990 (Bengali); 12 March 1990 (Hindi)
- Running time: 125 minutes
- Country: India
- Languages: Hindi; Bengali

Andha Bichar (transl. Blind Judgement) is a 1990 Indian Bengali-language action thriller film directed by Shakti Samanta. It is a bilingual film which was also simultaneously made in Hindi as Dushman (transl. Enemy). The film stars Mithun Chakraborty and Mandakini as the lead protagonists. The film is based on the story of Shaktipada Rajguru. The film was commercially successful, and attained a cult status.

== Plot ==
A fast-paced action thriller, with Mithun Chakraborty as the lead, Rakesh (Chakraborty) – a small town boy – has been torn away from his father (Aloknath), mother (Tanuja), and sister (Dipa Sahi) due to crisis. Terror strikes in the family after Aloknath is sent to jail in fraudulent cases. He is on the run due to police threats. In due course, Rakesh meets Lakshmi (Mandakini) and love blossoms. Even though Rakesh tries being truthful, he enters a different world. Will Rakesh unite with his long lost family and lead a happy life with the love of his life?

== Cast ==
- Mithun Chakraborty as Rakesh / Bullet
- Mandakini as Lakshmi
- Sadashiv Amrapurkar as Kalicharan
- Alok Nath as Rakesh's father
- Deepa Sahi as Geeta
- Ranjeet
- Tanuja as Rakesh's mother
- Biplab Chatterjee
- Vijay Arora
- Bob Christo
- Tarun Ghosh
- Manik Dutt

== Soundtrack ==
The music was composed by R. D. Burman and the lyrics were penned by Swapan Chakraborty.

Songs
No.	Title	Playback	Length
1.	"Ae Jhil Mil Jhil Mil"	Asha Bhosle, Amit Kumar	4:48
2.	"Bhuli Na Maa Dure Theke"	Amit Kumar	6:02
3.	"Amar Jibone Tumi Ele"	Amit Kumar, Sadhana Sargam	4:44
4.	"Jodi Pawa Jaye"	Asha Bhosle, Amit Kumar	5:21
5.	"Aashun Aashun Kheye Dekhun"	Amit Kumar	5:15
6.	"Tui Jodi Go Mohamaya"	Amit Kumar	4:31
