= Alok Nath =

Indian actor (born 1956)

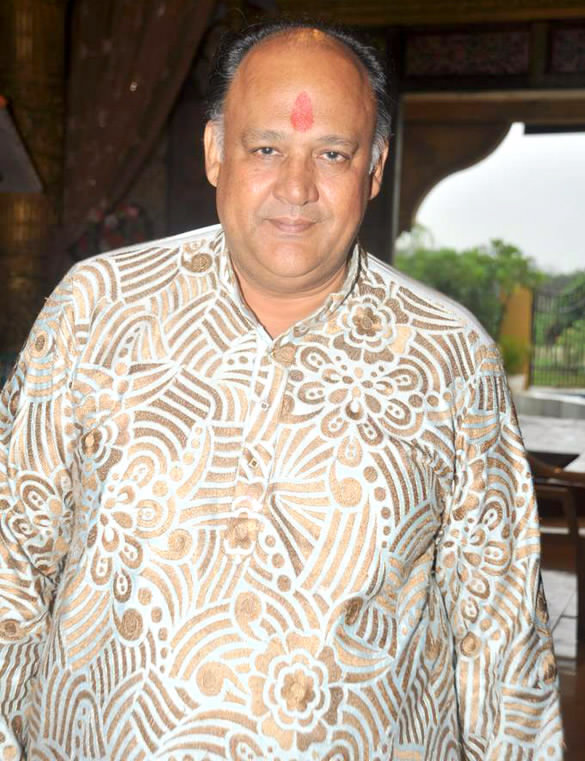
- Alok at an event in 2012
- Born: 10 July 1956 (age 70); Khagaria, Bihar, India
- Occupation: Actor
- Years active: 1980–present
- Spouse: Ashu Singh (m. 1987)

Alok Nath (born 10 July 1956) is an Indian actor known for his work in Hindi cinema and television.

== Career ==
He made his film debut with the 1982 English (and Hindi) film Gandhi, directed by Sir Richard Attenborough, which won an Oscar Academy Award for Best Picture that year. He appeared in the soap opera, Buniyaad, which took the country by storm in 1986 when was in his 20s and by the time show ended he had played the role of 80 years old man in that show. He was also in Rishtey, which aired from 1999 to 2001. He appeared in Star Plus serials like Sapna Babul Ka...Bidaai, Yahaaan Main Ghar Ghar Kheli and Yeh Rishta Kya Kehlata Hai.

In December 2013, jokes and memes based on characters played by Alok Nath started trending on social media and spread quickly. The Curious Case of Alok Nath - Why did Alok Nath Trend on Twitter, a case-study to analyze the content which led to the interest in Nath, became popular on 4 January 2014. Reacting to the jokes, the actor admitted that he liked most of them.

After Nath was accused of rape by writer-producer Vinda Nanda and sexual misconduct by multiple women during the Indian Me Too movement in 2018, the Mumbai Police opened an investigation against him, but the case was closed by the police in 2019 due to the lack of evidence. Nath and his wife sued Nanda for defamation.

== Personal life ==
Nath was born in Khagaria in Bihar state on 10 July 1956. Nath has a sister, Vineeta Malik, she is known for the portrayal of the character Bhairavi in the television series Yeh Rishta Kya Kehlata Hai. The actress Neena Gupta reportedly stated that Nath was her first boyfriend in 1980s and she moved to Mumbai to be with him. He later married Ashu Singh in 1987 who was a production assistant on the set of the 1986 soap opera Buniyaad in which Nath had acted. They have a son named Shivang Nath.

== Filmography ==
=== Film ===
Year	Title	Role	Notes
1982	Gandhi	Tyeb Mohammed	
1984	Amar Jyoti		
1984	Mashaal	Dinesh	
1984	Saaransh	Pandit / Astrologer	
1984	Aaj Ki Awaaz	Hotel / bar owner	
1984	Pet Pyaar Aur Paap		
1984	Sheeshay Ka Ghar		
1985	Apna Jahan	D'Souza	
1985	Faasle	Shivraj's brother	
1987	Kachchi Kali		
1987	Zevar	Jagdish	
1987	Yeh Woh Manzil To Nahin		
1987	Mohre	Father Braganza	
1987	Marte Dam Tak	Judge Rameshwar Dayal	
1987	Kamagni		
1988	Qayamat Se Qayamat Tak	Jaswant Singh	
1988	Kabzaa	Ustad Ali Mohammed	
1988	Main Zinda Hoon	Alok	
1988	Dayavan	Karim Baba	
1988	Agnee	Pramod	
1988	Trishagni		
1988	Hamara Khandaan	Mr. Miranda (Ruby's dad)	
1989	Bandook Dahej Ke Seenay Par		
1989	Joshilaay		
1989	Kasam Suhaag Ki		
1989	Suryaa: An Awakening	Veer Singh	
1989	Anjaane Rishte	Ram Mohan	
1989	Maine Pyar Kiya	Karan	
1990	Sur Asur		
1990	Insaaf Ka Suraj		
1990	Andha Bichar	Rakesh's father	
1990	Agneepath	Deenanath Chauhan	
1990	Lekin...	Ustad Meraj Ali	
1990	Shadyantra		
1990	Hatimtai		
1990	CID	IGP Kumar	
1990	Jamai Raja	Vishwanath	
1990	Pati Parmeshwar		
1990	Dushman	Rakesh's Father	
1990	Din Dahade		
1991	Netraheen Sakshi		
1991	Majboor Ladki		
1991	Vishnu-Devaa	Baba (Undertaker)	
1991	Ayee Milan Ki Raat		
1991	Baharon Ke Manzil		
1991	Pyar Bhara Dil	Porash Sunderlal	
1991	Phool Bane Angaray	Colonel Singh	
1991	Shanti Kranti	Police Commissioner	
1991	Maut Ki Sazaa	Raja Jai Singh	
1992	Mehboob Mere Mehboob	Mr. T. Choudhry	
1992	Khel	Anand	
1992	Gori		
1992	Dil Ne Ikaar Kiya		
1992	Shola Aur Shabnam	Com. Yashpal Thapa	
1992	Vishwatma	Anurag Singh	
1992	Meera Ka Mohan		
1992	Sahebzaade	Kishan	
1992	Deewana	Mr. Sharma	
1992	Bol Radha Bol	Shanti Prasad	
1992	Sone Ki Zanjeer		
1992	Tirangaa	Home Minister	
1992	Sapne Sajan Ke	Deepak's dad	
1992	Sanam Tere Hain Hum		
1992	Police Aur Mujrim	Chief Minister	Uncredited
1992	Naseebwaala	Iqbal	
1993	Shri Krishna Bhakta Narsi	Narsi	
1993	Shabnam		
1993	Dharam Ka Insaaf		
1993	Chingari Aur Sholay		
1993	Aye Meri Bekhudi		
1993	Tara		
1993	Game	Inspector Patil	
1993	Divya Shakti	Professor	
1993	Antim Nyay	Aadesh Varma	
1993	Chor Aur Chaand	Dinkar Seth	
1993	Izzat Ki Roti	Kaka	
1993	Dil Hai Betaab	Raja's dad	
1993	Sainik	Bihari Kaka	
1993	Kasam Teri Kasam		
1993	Zakhmo Ka Hisaab	Kailash Nath	
1993	Jaan Per Khel Kar		
1994	Sone Ki Sita		
1994	Rakhwale	Satyanarayan	
1994	Kohk		
1994	Zamane Se Kya Darna		
1994	Insaniyat	Hardayal	
1994	Laadla	Kaajal's dad	
1994	Kanoon	Judge Dharmadhikari	
1994	Chauraha	Masterji	
1994	Maha Shaktishaali		
1994	Saajan Ka Ghar	Mr. Ram Khanna	
1994	Gangster	Gangster	
1994	Anth	Principal Satyaprakash Saxena	
1994	Hum Aapke Hain Koun..!	Kailashnath	
1994	Eena Meena Deeka	Kashi	
1994	Zaalim	Judge Somnath	
1994	Sangdil Sanam	Kailash Nath	
1994	Mr. Azaad	Havaldar Hari Dada	
1995	Mere Naina Sawan Bhadon		
1995	Jeena Nahin Bin Tere		
1995	Jai Vikraanta	Choudhry Amar Singh	
1995	Hathkadi	Chief Minister	
1995	Gaddaar	Amar Nath (Priya's dad)	
1995	Sidhi	Aditya Diwan whom later got controlled by sadhu (vidyanand)	
1995	Ravan Raaj: A True Story	Commissioner of Police	
1995	Hulchul	Om Gautam (Chief Minister)	Uncredited
1995	Hum Dono	Vikram Saigal	
1995	Ram Shastra	Lawyer Srivastava	
1995	Kartavya	Dr. Neelkanth	
1996	Jai Dhakshineshwari Kali Maa		
1996	Vijeta	Advocate Durga Prasad	
1996	Agni Sakshi		
1996	Agni Prem		
1996	Papa Kehte Hain		
1996	Maahir	Amar Rai	
1996	Jeet	Prof. Sidhant Sharma	
1996	Zordaar	Sangha	
1996	Rakshak	Commissioner of Police	
1996	Talaashi		
1996	Hahakaar	Sayed Ur Rehman	
1996	Ek Tha Raja	Commissioner Paramjeet Singh	
1997	Char Dham		
1997	Anyay Hi Anyay		
1997	Jeevan Yudh	Vasudev Rai	
1997	Lahoo Ke Do Rang	Abu Baba	
1997	Kaun Sachcha Kaun Jhootha	Chief Minister	
1997	Dil Kitna Nadan Hai	Vikram Singh Khuran	
1997	Insaaf: The Final Justice	MP Jagat Narayan	
1997	Ghoonghat	Uday Shankar	
1997	Khwaab	Priya's dad	
1997	Pardes	Suraj Dev	
1998	Tirchhi Topiwale	Alok Lucknowi	
1998	Mafia Raaj	Lawyer	
1998	Vinashak – Destroyer	Police Commissioner	
1998	Kabhi Na Kabhi	Rajeshwar's Father	
1998	Bada Din	Shankar Babu	
1999	Amruta		
1999	Aa Ab Laut Chalen	Rohan's Grandfather	
1999	Silsila Hai Pyar Ka	Satyaprakash Sinha	
1999	Pyar Koi Khel Nahin		
1999	Taal	Tara Babu	
1999	Hum Saath-Saath Hain: We Stand United	Ramkishan	
2000	Rahasya		
2000	Bechainee	Chopra	
2000	Kaali Topi Laal Rumaal	Bishamber	
2000	Aaghaaz	Ram Charan Shukla	
2000	Khiladi 420	Shyam Prasad Bharadwaj	
2000	Le Chal Apne Sang	Dhanraj	
2001	Hum Deewane Pyar Ke	Avinash Roy / Chatterjee	
2001	Dil Aa Gaya		
2001	Uljhan	Mr. Mathur	
2001	Ek Rishtaa: The Bond of Love	Jagmohan Thappar	
2001	Mujhe Kucch Kehna Hai	Rana Birendra Pratapsingh	
2001	Jaydev		
2001	Kabhi Khushi Kabhie Gham	Om Sharma	
2002	Kaaboo	Master (Shankar's dad)	
2002	Tumko Na Bhool Paayenge	Rahim	
2002	Ansh: The Deadly Part	Dina Nathji	
2002	Aap Mujhe Achche Lagne Lage	Rohit's dad	
2002	Na Tum Jaano Na Hum	Mr. Malhotra (Esha's granddad)	
2002	Hum Tumhare Hain Sanam	Dev Narayan	
2002	Mere Yaar Ki Shaadi Hai	Vishnu Sharma	
2002	Dil Hai Tumhaara	Mr. Khanna	
2002	Jeena Sirf Merre Liye	Mr. Khanna	
2002	Rishtey	Judge	
2002	Angaar: The Fire		
2003	Dabdaba	Girdharilal	
2003	Indian Babu	Sharad Babu	
2003	Kaise Kahoon Ke... Pyaar Hai	Somnath	
2003	Pinjar	Shyamlal (Ramchand's dad)	
2003	Maa Santoshi Maa		
2004	Kuchh Kaha Aapne..		
2004	30 Days	Rai Bahadur Vikram Singh	
2004	Ishq Hai Teri Tumse	Usman	
2004	Police Force: An Inside Story	Commissioner of Police	
2004	Bhola in Bollywood	Mehra	
2005	Saathi: The Companion		
2005	Vaada	Mr. Sharma	
2005	Zameer: The Fire Within	Deepraj Khanna	
2005	Tango Charlie	Mr. Anand Chauhan (Tarun's dad)	
2005	Sab Kuch Hai Kuch Bhi Nahin	Jayshankar Chaube	
2005	That Game of Chess	Father	
2006	Mere Jeevan Saathi	Vicky's dad	
2006	Chand Ke Paar Chalo	Chander's Father	
2006	Vivah	Krishnakant	
2007	Aur Pappu Pass Ho Gaya	Pappu's dad	
2007	Sirf Romance: Love by Chance	Gaffoor	
2008	Mukhbir	Mammu	
2008	Ek Vivaah... Aisa Bhi	Bhushan Shrivastava	Hindi
2009	Raftaar - An Obsession	Khanna	
2009	Sanam Teri Kasam	Khanna	
2009	Thanks Maa	Warden - Juvenile Center	
2010	Life Express	Mr. Singh - Tanvi's dad	
2011	Vikalp	Indian Ambassador	
2011	Khap	Professor	
2011	Trapped in Tradition: Rivaaz	Mukhiya	
2014	Punha Gondhal Punha Mujra		Marathi film
2014	Kill Dil	Jeewan Sambandh Insurance Owner	
2015	Second Hand Husband		
2016	Dil Toh Deewana Hai		
2016	Sargoshiyan		
2018	Sonu Ke Titu Ki Sweety	Ghasitaram	
2019	De De Pyaar De	Veerendra Mehra	
2020	Jai Mummy Di	Sanjog Luthra (Sanju Ji)	
2026	Yeh Prem Mol Liya		Comeback film

=== Television ===
Year	Title	Role	Notes
1980	Rishte-Naate	Babuji	
1985	Darpan	Various Roles	
1985	Titliyan	Father	
1985	Chapte Chapter	News Paper Editor	
1986	Buniyaad	Master Haveli Ram	
1988	Bharat Ek Khoj	Vivekanand	Episode 47
1989	Boond Boond	Professor	
1989	Lohit Kinare	Different Roles	
1990	Lahoo Ke Phool	Farmer	
1992	Talaash	Shankarlal Shrivastava	
1993–1997	Tara	Deepak Seth / Dipak Saigal Reborn	
1994	Daane Anaar Ke	Babuji	
1994–1995	Imtihaan		
1994-1995	Hero Uncle		
1999–2001	Rishtey	Babuji	
1997	Kabhie Kabhie	Babuji	Directed by Mahesh Bhatt and written by Anurag Kashyap, Akash Khurana and Vinta Nanda
1998-1999	Khiladi	Police Commissinor	
2002-2006	Astitva...Ek Prem Kahani	Saurabh Mathur	
2002-2006	Piya Ka Ghar	Bhavanishankar Sharma	
2005-2006	Woh Rehne Waali Mehlon Ki	Yashvardhan Mittal	Rani Mittal/Goyal's father
2007	Har Ghar Kuch Kehta Hai	Baldev Kapoor	Gyan's father
2007-2009	Ghar Ek Sapnaa	Amarnath Chaudhary	Samman's father
2007–2010	Sapna Babul Ka...Bidaai	Prakashchandra Sharma	Ragini's father and Sadna's mamaji
2009-2012	Yahan Main Ghar Ghar Kheli	Udaypratap Singh	Karan's father in law
2011–2013	Kuch Toh Log Kahenge	Dr. Ashish Mathur	Dr. Ashutosh's adoptive father and Dr. Nidhi's maternal grandfather
2013	Do Dil Bandhe Ek Dori Se	Balwant Rana	Shivani's grandfather and Raghu's master
2014	Tu Mere Agal Bagal Hai	Babuji	Father of Laal Singh (Rajesh Kumar)
2014–2015	Mere Rang Mein Rangne Waali	Dada ji	LD's grandfather
2015–2016	Yeh Rishta Kya Kehlata Hai	Chandrabhan Singh Shekhawat	Tara's grandfather
