= Trupti =

Trupti is an Indian feminine given name. Notable people with the name include:

- Trupti Desai (born 1985), Indian social activist
- Trupti Murgunde (born 1982), Indian Badminton player
- Trupti Patel (fl. 1997), British pharmacist and acquitted murderer
