= Zara Si Zindagi =

1983 film by K. Balachander

- Poster
- Directed by: K. Balachander
- Written by: Gulzar (dialogues)
- Story by: K. Balachander
- Based on: Varumayin Niram Sivappu (1980) by K. Balachander
- Produced by: Premaalaya
- Starring: Kamal Haasan; Anita Raj
- Cinematography: B. S. Lokanath
- Edited by: N. R. Kittoo
- Music by: Laxmikant–Pyarelal
- Production company: Premaalaya Films
- Release date: 7 January 1983
- Running time: 149 minutes
- Country: India
- Language: Hindi

Zara Si Zindagi (transl. A Slice of Life) is a 1983 Indian Hindi-language film directed by K. Balachander, starring Kamal Haasan, Anita Raj, Nilu Phule, Mazhar Khan, Shreeram Lagoo, Karan Razdan.

It was the remake of the Tamil film Varumayin Niram Sivappu (1980), which was directed by Balachander himself. Zara Si Zindagi's story was written by Balachander, while the dialogues were written by Gulzar.

== Plot ==
Rakesh, a young man who has an M.A. in philosophy, comes to Delhi from Bihar looking for a job. Rakesh, along with his friend Amit from Bengal lives in a slum. One day Amit's friend Tilak from Punjab goes to that dilapidated cottage to stay where Rakesh and Amit reside. The three men share everything that they get to eat, but usually go without food. One day, Rakesh sees a girl named Kusum at a bus stop waiting for the next bus towards the railway station, Rakesh offers to carry her luggage to the railway station as the bus service is closed and taxi drivers are on strike on that day. On reaching the railway station, Kusum pays Rakesh to which he replies that he has no change. She rebukes him in Punjabi language assuming he does not speak the language that he is trying to cheat her. Rakesh tells her that he knows Punjabi.

Rakesh once chases a man to his house to get back the 15 rupees which he looted from him by lying. The man enters a house, Rakesh follows him by running after him and reaches that house, and Kusum opens the door after knocking. Rakesh learns that the man is Kusum's father. Rakesh tells about the money and Kusum returns the money to Rakesh. Kusum is a small-time stage actress. Kusum goes to Rakesh's house to introduce him to her stage play director to replace an ill actor so that he could earn some money as she learned that Rakesh is unemployed. Kusum introduces Rakesh to her stage-director Pratap, who is arrogant and short-tempered. Pratap has an obsession for Kusum. Pratap can't tolerate intimacy between Rakesh and Kusum. Pratap throws out Rakesh from stage drama acting because of disobeying him. Rakesh does not take the post of a clerk of a company after misbehaving with interview-takers and tears his certificates of educational qualifications.

Amit somehow earns money which he did so by the advice of a friend of his named Dilip. Tilak wants to know Dilip's identity. He ran away from home seeking him. Jaggu (Kusum's father) abandons their home and doesn't return for so many days. Kusum comes to Rakesh's house with her bag and baggage to live there, as her father's information is not known, where he has gone. Kusum gets a new job of baby-sitting, but gets fired quickly for losing the baby while buying a toy as she kept the baby in baby-stroller outside the toy shop. Actually the baby has been kidnapped by Amit, Amit fetches the baby to Rakesh and tells that their days of hardship and starving are over because he will demand ransom from that baby's parents. Kusum notices that the baby was that baby for whom she was doing the baby-sitting job. Kusum takes the baby from Amit and goes to its parents' house to return it. Rakesh beats Amit and asks him who Dilip is. Amit replies that there is no one named Dilip, his own negative mentality is Dilip. Rakesh expels him from the house and warns him not to return.

Kusum loves Rakesh, she tells this to a dumb artist Arun, a man whom both Rakesh and Kusum first met in a park.

Once Pratap tries to strangle Kusum in a stage play, later at night Pratap comes to Kusum's house and apologizes to her, Pratap tells her that he wants to marry her. Kusum agrees to marry to Pratap on a condition, and the condition is, Rakesh will have to be provided a job by Pratap's industrialist father Mohanlal Sharma. Rakesh does not take the job as he realises that Pratap is Mohanlal's son and Mohanlal tells that Kusum is his son's girlfriend. Pratap threatens to kill himself if Kusum does not want to marry him. Kusum agrees, but later sees Rakesh singing in a park while on a drive with Pratap, she gets down from the car and tells Rakesh that she will abide by whatever he wants, meanwhile Pratap leaves that place angrily and starts driving his car, not taking Kusum.

Amit is now a husband of a rich woman and Tilak has turned into a beggar who is mentally ill. The film ends with Rakesh and Kusum hugging in the park. Pratap gives the neck-chain bought by himself for marriage with Kusum to a street-beggar as alms in hot temperament.

== Cast ==
- Kamal Haasan as Rakesh Kumar Shastri
- Anita Raj as Kusum
- Nilu Phule as Jaggu
- Mazhar Khan as Pratap
- Shreeram Lagoo as Mr. Shastri
- Sulochana Latkar as Mrs. Shastri
- Karan Razdan as Amit
- Arjun Chakraborty as Tilak
- Arun Bakshi as Arun
- Rammohan Sharma as Mohanlal Sharma

== Soundtrack ==
The soundtrack of this film was composed by Laxmikant–Pyarelal and the lyrics were penned by Anand Bakshi.

Song	Singer
"Ghar Se School"	Kishore Kumar
"Kachcha Karawo"	Lata Mangeshkar
"Jise Maut Aayi"	K. J. Yesudas
"Zamane Mein"	S. P. Balasubrahmanyam
"Tana Dim Tana Dim" (Duet)	S. P. Balasubrahmanyam, Asha Bhosle
"Tana Dim" (Solo)	Asha Bhosle
