= Toolsidas Junior =

2022 Indian Hindi film

- Theatrical release poster
- Directed by: Mridul Mahendra
- Screenplay by: Mridul Mahendra; Ashutosh Gowariker
- Story by: Mridul Mahendra
- Dialogues by: Mridul Mahendra
- Produced by: Bhushan Kumar; Krishan Kumar; Ashutosh Gowariker; Sunita Gowariker
- Starring: Sanjay Dutt; Rajiv Kapoor; Dalip Tahil; Varun Buddhadev
- Cinematography: Kamaljeet Negi
- Edited by: Chandrashekhar Prajapati
- Music by: Daniel B. George
- Production companies: T-Series Films; Ashutosh Gowariker Productions
- Distributed by: AA Films
- Release date: 4 March 2022
- Country: India
- Language: Hindi

Toolsidas Junior is a 2022 Indian Hindi-language sports film written and directed by Mridul Mahendra, who based it on his own life and childhood. Produced jointly by Bhushan Kumar and Krishan Kumar under T-Series Films along with Sunita Gowariker and co-screenwriter Ashutosh Gowariker in his first production-only venture under Ashutosh Gowariker Productions, the film stars Sanjay Dutt, Rajiv Kapoor, Dalip Tahil and debutante Varun Buddhadev in the lead roles, while Ankur Vikal, Chinmai Chandrashuh, Tasveer Kamil and Sara Arjun play supporting roles. The film marks the posthumous and final film appearance of Rajiv Kapoor who died in February 2021, shortly after completing filming.

Toolsidas Junior was initially scheduled to release in cinemas on 4 March 2022. Eventually, it was released on television and digital platforms. At the Awards 68th National Film Awards, it won the National Film Award for Best Feature Film in Hindi, and Buddhadev was awarded the National Jury Award — Special Mention.

== Plot ==
When an ace snooker player, who only plays for his son, loses an important tournament to arch rival Jimmy Tandon, his son takes it upon himself to restore honour to his father. Despite his young age, help arrives in the form of run down street snooker maestro Mohammed Salaam, who coaches the boy on what it means to play the sport.

== Cast ==
- Sanjay Dutt as Mohammed Salaam a.k.a. Salaam Bhai
- Rajiv Kapoor as Toolsidas
- Dalip Tahil as Jimmy Tandon
- Varun Buddhadev as Mridul "Midi"
- Chinmai Chandranshuh as Gautam "Goti", Midi's elder brother
- Tasveer Kamil as Mrs. Toolsidas, Midi and Goti's mother
- Ankur Vikal as K. K. Burman, professional snooker player
- Barun Chanda as the President of Snookers Club
- Don Ray as Tutu Bose
- Sara Arjun as Pia, Midi's friend
- Rajesh Bhatt as Marwadi Seth

== Release ==
Due to the Covid-19 Pandemic, Toolsidas Junior had a direct-to-television release. on Sony Max, premiering on 23 May 2022. On 25 May 2022, just two days after its television premiere, the film was made available for streaming on Netflix.

== Music ==
The film has only one song, composed by Daniel B. George, who also wrote the background score. Titled "Udd Chala", the song is sung by Sachet Tandon and Ujjwal Kashyap, with lyrics by Swanand Kirkire.

Track listing
No.	Title	Singer(s)	Length
1.	"Udd Chala"	Sachet Tandon, Ujjwal Kashyap	2:34
