= Pyar Ke Naam Qurbaan =

- Promotional Poster
- प्यार का नाम कुर्बान
- Directed by: Babbar Subhash
- Written by: Dr. Rahi Masoom Reza (dialogue)
- Screenplay by: Babbar Subhash
- Story by: Nayyar Jehan
- Produced by: Babbar Subhash
- Starring: Mithun Chakraborty; Dimple Kapadia; Mandakini; Danny Denzongpa
- Cinematography: Radhu Karmakar
- Edited by: Mangesh Chavan
- Music by: Bappi Lahiri
- Production company: B. Subhash Movie Unit
- Distributed by: Shemaroo Entertainment
- Release date: 5 January 1990
- Running time: 135 minutes
- Country: India
- Language: Hindi

Pyar Ke Naam Qurbaan (transl. Sacrifice in the name of love) is a 1990 Indian Hindi-language romantic action film directed by Babbar Subhash, starring Mithun Chakraborty, Dimple Kapadia, Mandakini and Danny Denzongpa.

== Plot ==
Billo is arrested for Devika's act, Billo kidnaps her. Devika's brother Yashwant now wants to kill Billo.

== Cast ==
- Mithun Chakraborty as Billo Chaudhary
- Dimple Kapadia as Rajkumari Devika Singh
- Mandakini as Gauri
- Danny Denzongpa as Thakur Yeshwant Singh
- Gulshan Grover as Master Dayashankar / Daku Shankar
- Raza Murad as Inspector Rashid Khan
- Yunus Parvez as Phoolchand, Yeshwant,s lawyer
- Murad as Judge Khanna
- Hemant Birje as Majid Khan
- Paintal as Peter
- Asrani as Khairatlal
- Tom Alter as Rexson
- Marc Zuber as Gautam
- Viju Khote as Damodar
- Girja Shankar as Abhishek
- K. K. Raj as Inspector Pratap
- Shashi Kiran as Shamsher Singh

== Music ==
1. "Pyar Ke Naam Qurban" - Shobha Joshi, Vijay Benedict
2. "Rang De Pyar Ke Rang Me" - Vijay Benedict, Shobha Joshi, Sarika Kapoor
3. "Sooni Sadak Pe Na Jaa Akele" - Vijay Benedict
4. "Tarsa Hu Tarsa Hu Mai Tarsaunga" - Sudesh Bhosle
5. "Baj Gayi Baj Gayi Pyar Ki Ghanti" - Vijay Benedict
