= C.I.D. (1990 film) =

- Directed by: Ajay Goel
- Written by: Suraj Sanim
- Produced by: Kamal Sadanah
- Starring: Vinod Khanna; Amrita Singh; Juhi Chawla
- Cinematography: Chaman K. Bajoo
- Edited by: Wamanrao
- Music by: Kalyanji-Anandji
- Release date: 25 May 1990
- Country: India
- Language: Hindi

C.I.D. is a 1990 Indian Hindi action film directed by Ajay Goel. The film stars Vinod Khanna, Amrita Singh, Juhi Chawla, Suresh Oberoi, Shafi Inamdar, Aloknath and Kiran Kumar.

== Plot ==
C.I.D. Inspector Veer Sehgal (Vinod Khanna) wages war against organized crime. His enemy is Roshan Lala (Kiran Kumar), the overlord of the drug and gold smuggling racket in India. So dangerous a man is Roshan Lala that no witness has ever dared to come forward to give evidence against him in court. Frustrated by the lack of evidence and witnesses needed to convict Roshan Lala, Inspector Veer manages to have a young undercover officer, Raksha Mehra (Juhi Chawla), infiltrate Roshan Lala's organization. However, she is soon discovered to be a police officer and ruthlessly shot down by Roshan in a deserted street. Fatefully, this murder is witnessed by Mr. and Mrs. Saxena, a respectable middle-aged couple whose only daughter, Meghna Saxena (Amrita Singh), is engaged to be married to Inspector Veer. Will Roshan Lala be successful in his design? Does Inspector Veer convict Roshan Lala, or does he lose his beloved forever?

== Cast ==
- Vinod Khanna as CID Inspector Veer Sehgal
- Amrita Singh as Meghna Saxena
- Juhi Chawla as CID Inspector Raksha Mehra
- Suresh Oberoi as Major Brijmohan Verma
- Kiran Kumar as Roshan Lala
- Aloknath as IGP Kumar
- Shafi Inamdar as Inspector Faizan
- Aftab Shivdasani as Sunny
- Bharat Kapoor as Sunil Saxena
- Aparajita as Sudha Saxena
- Sudhir as Micheal

== Soundtrack ==
The Music was scored by Kalyanji-Anandji. Lyrics were penned by Anjaan and Ramesh Pant. The playback singers were Kishore Kumar, Amit Kumar, Kumar Sanu, Alka Yagnik, Alisha Chinai and Jolly Mukherjee.

Song	Singer
"Sapna Kahoon"	Kishore Kumar
"Jeena Padega"	Amit Kumar, Alka Yagnik
"Teri Na Na Na"	Kumar Sanu, Alka Yagnik
"Jadu Mere Husn Ka"	Jolly Mukherjee, Alka Yagnik
"Pyas Dil Ki Bujha Do"	Alisha Chinai
