= Sheshnaag (film) =

- Theatrical release poster
- Directed by: K.R. Reddy
- Written by: Iqbal Durrani(dialogues)
- Screenplay by: Ravi Kapoor; Mohan Kaul
- Story by: Rajendra Singh
- Produced by: Syed Ayub; Nalini Shankar; Deepak Adhiya
- Starring: Jeetendra; Rishi Kapoor; Rekha; Madhavi; Mandakini
- Cinematography: Harinath Reddy
- Edited by: Muarli-Ramaiah
- Music by: Laxmikant–Pyarelal
- Production company: AA Films
- Release date: 25 July 1990
- Running time: 144 minutes
- Country: India
- Language: Hindi

Sheshnaag (transl. 1000 Headed Cobra) is a 1990 Indian Hindi-language fantasy film, produced by Syed Ayub, Deepak Adhiya and Nalini Shankar under the AA Films banner and directed by K.R. Reddy. It stars Jeetendra, Rekha, Rishi Kapoor, Madhavi, and Mandakini, with music composed by Laxmikant–Pyarelal.

== Cast ==
- Jeetendra as Pritam (Ichchhadhari Naag - Shape Shifting Male Cobra), Banu's Husband
- Madhavi as Banu (Ichchhadhari Naagin - Shape Shifting Female Cobra), Pritam's Wife
- Rishi Kapoor as Bhola, Champa's Younger Brother, Kamini's Love Interest
- Mandakini as Kamini, Seth Lalchand Daughter, Bhola's Love Interest
- Rekha as Champa, Bhola's elder sister and Bansi Lal's Wife. Banu Also took Champa's form to help and take care of Bhola after Champa's suicide attempt.
- Anupam Kher as Bansi Lal, Champa's Husband
- Danny Denzongpa as Aghori, a Snake Charmer Tantrik and Vishpurush, Seth Lalchand's Mentor
- Raza Murad as Seth Lalchand, Kamini's Father
- Dan Dhanoa as Vikram, Seth Lalchand's Business Partner and Kamini's Fiancé
- Sudhir as Snake Charmer from Aghori's Group
- Bharat Bhushan as Sage (Panditji), Caretaker of Sheshnaag Temple
- Jack Gaud as Ganpat
- Birbal as Batesar

== Soundtrack ==
Anand Bakshi has written all the songs.

#	Title	Singer(s)
1	"Hamein Aasma Ne Bheja"	Suresh Wadkar, Anuradha Paudwal
2	"Chhed Milan Ke Geet Mitwa"	Suresh Wadkar, Anuradha Paudwal
3	"O Mere Dushman"	Anuradha Paudwal
4	"Dosti Ke Geet Mein"	Mohammed Aziz
5	"Tera Haath Na Chhodungi"	Alka Yagnik
6	"Hamein Aasma Ne Bheja" - Sad	Suresh Wadkar, Anuradha Paudwal
7	"Been Music"	Instrumental
