= Naya Khoon =

- Directed by: Rajat Rakshit
- Written by: Raman Gupta
- Produced by: D. P. Holey; Vijay Salankar; Raman Gupta
- Starring: Govinda; Mandakini
- Cinematography: S. N. Dubey
- Music by: Usha Khanna
- Release date: 6 April 1990
- Country: India
- Language: Hindi

Naya Khoon is a 1990 Indian Bollywood action film directed by Rajat Rakshit. The film stars Govinda and Mandakini in pivotal roles.

== Plot ==
Seema, the daughter of rich industrialist Veerendra Pratap Rai, joins a medical college where her friend Sapna is helping her fit in. Unbeknownst to Seema, Sapna is in love with her brother Vikram Pratap or VP. Sapna often tells her grandfather she is studying with her collegemate Anand when she is actually with VP. Anand helps perpetuate the lie, but he too does not know Sapna's lover's identity.

Seema and Anand fall in love in college, and go on to open clinics to serve the poor. Meanwhile, Veerendra Pratap hands over his medicine-making factory to son VP, on the condition that it be run in a no-profit-no-loss basis. VP, however, joins hands with his friend Anil and some other corrupt friends, and supplies counterfeit medicine to make a profit.

At this point, Seema has already encountered Anil, having saved a young girl from being raped by him and his friends. She later treats a girl whom Anil wanted to pass around with his friends, and who was molested by VP. Meanwhile, Sapna and VP are already married now, but in secret, and she is carrying his child when he tries to trick her into getting an abortion. She escapes the attempt, but upon facing rejection from VP, leaves everyone behind and writes a letter to that effect.

Seema finds Sapna years later when the latter falls ill while staying with a priest and sends someone to fetch Anand. Since Anand and Seema are working at the same hospital, she comes across this person, accompanies him to find Seema, and finds out Sapna already has a child. However, Sapna refuses to divulge the father's name, and tries the disappearing act again, leaving behind a letter where she asks Seema to give the child to Anand to bring up.

Meanwhile, Anand discovers fake medicine at the hospital and tries to bust the racket behind it. Anil tries to buy him off, but gets thrashed instead. Moreover, Anand lodges a formal complaint against the medicine company, which gets sealed and Veerendra Pratap has to bear the ire of the very masses that used to revere him.

Anil and VP, however, manage to scapegoat an accomplice and put the blame on Anand, who meanwhile finds Sapna and deduces from a coat and a tie-pin that her child's father is VP. He goes to confront VP, but gets captured and thrashed by VP and Anil. VP, meanwhile, has arranged for Anil to marry Seema, and an engagement date is fixed.

On the engagement day, Anil's debauchery is exposed when Seema produces the girl he lured into a hotel to pass around, and she exposes VP's activities as well. The scapegoated accomplice also arrives, turning on both VP and Anil. Sapna also arrives, but refuses to let VP be called her child's father because she now sees him as little more than an animal, even though Anand, who has also arrived there, insists that VP do so.

At this point, Veerendra Pratap reveals that he found VP on the road, and chose to adopt him and raise him like his son. A reformed VP accepts his paternal responsibilities, and he and Anil are taken away by the police. Meanwhile, Veerendra Pratap takes in Sapna, accepting her child as his family's heir.

== Cast ==
- Govinda as Dr. Anand
- Mandakini as Dr. Seema Rai
- Saeed Jaffrey as Veerendra Pratap Rai
- Raza Murad as Vikram Pratap Rai
- Gulshan Grover as Dr. Anil Verma
- Rita Bhaduri as Sapna Shrivastav
- Bharat Bhushan as Mr. Shrivastav

== Soundtrack ==
All songs were written by Indeevar.

No.	Title	Singer(s)	Length
1.	"Main Garib Dilwala Hoon"	Kishore Kumar, Anuradha Paudwal
2.	"Meethi Woh Murli"	Bhupinder Singh, Anuradha Paudwal
3.	"Hum Jisse Lipat Kar Ro Lete"	Suresh Wadkar, Anuradha Paudwal
4.	"Dard Sabhi Ka Ek Hi Jaisa"	Kishore Kumar, Anuradha Paudwal
