= Ajay Goel =

Ajay Goel (born 1977) is an American software entrepreneur known for developing GMass, an email marketing company that integrates with Gmail. He is also the founder of JangoMail, an email marketing platform, and Wordzen, an email editing service.

== Career ==
=== JangoMail ===
Goel founded JangoMail on a shoestring budget in 2002; he coded the original version of the software himself while he was living in Cleveland. In a 2009 article published by Entrepreneur, Goel discussed changes to JangoMail's website intended to improve lead generation and customer conversion. The article reported an increase in conversion following the redesign.

A second article in Entrepreneur discussed JangoMail's website redesign and Goel's approach to attracting visitors through search engines.

In an interview with Mixergy, Goel said he sold JangoMail in 2013 to Everest Group, LLC, a private equity group based in Omaha, Nebraska. He stated that the company generated about $6 million in annual revenue at the time of the sale and had 12 employees.

=== GMass ===
In 2015, Goel developed GMass after encountering difficulties sending personalized emails to multiple recipients through Gmail while working on Wordzen, an email editing service.

GMass provides tools for sending personalized email campaigns through Gmail. Although it began as a browser extension, its functionality expanded to include email scheduling, automated follow-ups, and campaign analytics. A 2018 profile in Built In Chicago reported that the service had more than 100,000 users and generated over $1 million in annual revenue at that time.

Although the company has seven employees as of 2026, Goel is the sole developer. The company launched a ChatGPT plugin and a Claude connector based on GMass' model context protocol in November of 2026.
