= Amrita Singh =

Indian actress (born 1958)

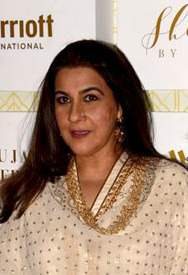
- Singh in 2017
- Born: 9 February 1958 (age 68); Delhi, India
- Education: Modern School
- Occupation: Actress
- Years active: 1983–2025
- Spouse: Saif Ali Khan (m. 1991; div. 2004)
- Children: Sara Ali Khan; Ibrahim Ali Khan
- Mother: Rukhsana Sultana
- Relatives: Khan–Banu family

Amrita Shivender Singh (Note: See SWAPNASUNDARI TALENT PRIVATE LIMITED, whose directors are herself and her daughter Sara Ali Khan. Wikipedia uses legal name for introduction.) (born 9 February 1958), also known as Aziza, is an Indian actress who mainly works in Hindi films. Singh made her acting debut with Betaab (1983), and established herself as a leading actress of the 1980s and early 1990s.

Singh appeared as a leading lady in commercially successful films such as Mard (1985), Chameli Ki Shaadi (1986), Naam (1986), Khudgarz (1987), Thikana (1987), Waaris (1988), Toofan (1989), Dil Aashna Hai (1992), Aaina (1993), and Rang (1993). For Aaina, she won the Filmfare Award for Best Supporting Actress.

In 1993, Singh took a break from acting. She returned to films with 23rd March 1931: Shaheed (2002), and received praise for her performance in Kalyug (2005), Shootout at Lokhandwala ( 2007), 2 States (2014), Hindi Medium (2017), and Badla (2019).

Singh has also starred in the television soap opera Kkavyanjali (2005–2006). She was married to actor Saif Ali Khan from 1991 to 2004, with whom she has two children, Bollywood actors Sara Ali Khan and Ibrahim Ali Khan.

== Early life ==
Amrita Singh was born 9 February 1958 to Rukhsana Sultana and an Indian Army Officer Shivinder Singh Virk, son of Sardar Jaspal Singh of Jandiala Guru in Amritsar and of Sardarni Mohinder Kaur, daughter of the late Sir and Lady Sobha Singh of New Delhi and Hadali. Amrita's aunt Raymon Singh is married to HH Raja Vijayendra Singh, the present Raja Sahib of Nalagarh Princely State. She has a half-sister named Aneesa and a half-brother named Jaiveer from her dad's second marriage. Her father remarried when Amrita was 11 years old post his divorce with Rukshana Sultana. Her mother was a political associate of Sanjay Gandhi during the Indian Emergency in the 1970s, who became known for leading Sanjay Gandhi's sterilisation campaign in the Muslim areas of Old Delhi. Through her paternal grandmother Mohinder Kaur, Amrita is the great-granddaughter of Sobha Singh, one of the builders of New Delhi, the grandniece of the late novelist Khushwant Singh, and great-grandniece of politician Ujjal Singh. The actress Begum Para is her great-aunt, whose husband, Nasir Khan, is the brother of Dilip Kumar. Singh was a childhood friend of Shah Rukh Khan. Their mothers often worked together in the Old Delhi area and Singh attended the same school as Khan's sister, Shahnaz.

Singh attended Modern School in New Delhi and is fluent in Punjabi, Cantonese and Swahili.

== Career ==
=== 1983–1993 ===
Singh made her Hindi cinema debut in 1983 with Betaab, a highly successful romantic drama in which she was paired with Sunny Deol. This was quickly followed by a succession of hits, such as Sunny (1984), Mard (which was the biggest hit of 1985) and Saaheb (also 1985), Chameli Ki Shaadi and Naam (both 1986), Khudgarz (1987), and Waaris (1988). Singh made a successful pair in several films, not only with Sunny Deol, Sanjay Dutt, and Raj Babbar, but also with Jeetendra, Vinod Khanna, Anil Kapoor and Amitabh Bachchan, some of the leading actors of the 1980s. As well as playing leading roles, she also played supporting negative roles in films such as Raju Ban Gaya Gentleman (1992), Suryavanshi (1992) and Aaina (1993), winning the Filmfare Award for Best Supporting Actress for the lattermost. Her comic timings in films such as Saaheb and Chameli Ki Shaadi are still remembered. She decided to retire into family life and quit acting after her appearance in Rang (1993).

=== 2002–present ===
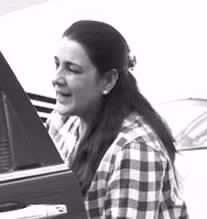
Singh in 2011

Singh returned to acting in 2002 with 23rd March 1931: Shaheed, in which she played the mother of Bhagat Singh (played by Bobby Deol). She joined the television industry with Ekta Kapoor's family drama Kavyanjali, which aired on StarPlus in 2005. In the show, Singh was seen in a negative role that soon gained immense popularity. Later that year, she received critical acclaim for her performance in yet another negative role for the film Kalyug, which earned her a nomination for the Filmfare Award for Best Performance in a Negative Role. In 2007, Singh played the role of gangster Maya Dolas' mother, Ratnaprabha Dolas, in the Sanjay Gupta film Shootout at Lokhandwala, directed by Apoorva Lakhia. Vivek Oberoi played the role of Maya Dolas. Later on, she appeared in the anthology film Dus Kahaniyaan, where she appeared in the short story Poornmasi.

Continuing her acting journey, Singh was seen in Kajraare (2010), and also appeared in Aurangzeb (2012) under the Yash Raj Films banner, where she was paired with Jackie Shroff after almost two decades, after having paired together in Aaina. In 2014, she was seen in 2 States, produced by Dharma Productions, portraying the role of co-actor Arjun Kapoor's mother. The film was released on 18 April 2014, and was a critical and commercial success, and also earned Singh a second nomination for the Filmfare Award for Best Supporting Actress. In 2016, she appeared in Flying Jat playing Tiger Shroff's mother. In 2017, she appeared in the comedy-drama Hindi Medium as a school principal. In 2019, she appeared in Sujoy Ghosh's psychological mystery thriller Badla, reuniting with Amitabh Bachchan after 18 years. Badla and Singh's performance received widespread critical acclaim upon release. The film proved to be a commercial success, and Singh's performance earned her a third nomination for the Filmfare Award for Best Supporting Actress.

== Personal life ==
She married actor Saif Ali Khan in January 1991. Singh, who was raised as a Sikh, converted to Islam before marriage and took the name Aziza. The couple had an Islamic wedding. 12 years younger, Khan is the son of former Indian Test cricket captain Mansoor Ali Khan Pataudi, the ninth Nawab of Pataudi and actress Sharmila Tagore and is a member of the royal family of the erstwhile Bhopal State and Pataudi State. Despite controversies, they remained married. She gave up acting after her marriage to Khan. After thirteen years of marriage, the couple divorced in 2004. Their daughter Sara Ali Khan Pataudi was born on 12 August 1995, and son Ibrahim Ali Khan Pataudi on 5 March 2001.

== Artistry and legacy ==
Singh is regarded as one of the most popular and leading actress of the 80s. Her debut film Betaab made her an overnight sensation. Sukanya Verma of Rediff.com noted, "Amrita Singh is a heroine who breathed fire and shushed up anyone who dared disagree with her flare-ups and fury." Lakshana N Palat of Indian Express said that her career, comprised "a strong filmography" and noted, "With her narrowed eyes, and reverberating voice, Amrita created a new leading heroine. She has made a mark in every role that she has played — a 90’s vamp, a heroine, a mother, she has done it all." Ritika Nath of PTC Punjabi said, "From 1983 to 1993, Amrita Singh had the reigning ten years in the industry."

== Filmography ==
=== Films ===
Year	Title	Role	Notes
1983	Betaab	Roma (Dingy)	
1984	Sunny	Amrita	
1984	Duniya	Roma Verma	
1985	Saaheb	Natasha 'Nikki'	
1985	Mard	Ruby	
1986	Mera Dharam	Durga Thakur	
1986	Chameli Ki Shaadi	Chameli	
1986	Kala Dhanda Goray Log	Ramola/ Pooja	
1986	Karamdaata	Pinky	
1986	Naam	Rita	
1987	Naam O Nishan	Vanisha	
1987	Khudgarz	Mrs. Sinha	
1987	Thikana	Shaila	
1988	Mulzim	Mala	
1988	Kabzaa	Rita	
1988	Tamacha	Maria	
1988	Shukriyaa	Neema	
1988	Waaris	Shibo	
1988	Charnon Ki Saugandh	Kanchan Singh	
1988	Agnee	Tara	
1989	Sachai Ki Taqat	Mrs. Ram Singh	
1989	Hathyar	Suman	
1989	Galiyon Ka Badshah	Cameo	
1989	Ilaaka	Sub-Inspector Neha Singh	
1989	Batwara	Roopa	
1989	Toofan	Pickpocketer	
1989	Jaadugar	Mona	
1990	Veeru Dada	Meena	
1990	Karishma Kali Kaa	Parvati	
1990	Maut Ke Farishtey		
1990	Aag Ka Dariya		
1990	Kroadh	Matki	
1990	CID	Meghna Saxena	
1991	Sadhu Sant	Meena Kapoor	
1991	Paap Ki Aandhi	Reshma	
1991	Dharam Sankat	Madhu	
1991	Akayla	Sapna	
1991	Rupaye Dus Karod	Aarthi Saxena	
1991	Pyaar Ka Saaya	Maya Gangadhami	
1992	Raju Ban Gaya Gentleman	Sapna Chhabria	
1992	Suryavanshi	Princess Suryalekha	
1992	Dil Aashna Hai	Raj	
1993	Aaina	Roma Mathur	
1993	Rang	Indu	
2002	23rd March 1931: Shaheed	Vidya	
2005	Kalyug	Simi Roy	
2007	Shootout at Lokhandwala	Mom (Aai)	
2007	Dus Kahaniyaan	Mala	Segment: Pooranmasi
2010	Kajraare	Zohra Baano	
2013	Aurangzeb	Neena Wadhwa	
2014	2 States	Kavita Malhotra	
2016	A Flying Jatt	Mrs. Dhillon	
2017	Hindi Medium	Principal Lodha	
2019	Badla	Rani Kaur	
2022	Heropanti 2	Hema	

=== Television ===
Year	Title	Role	Platform	Notes
2005–2006	Kkavyanjali	Nitya Nanda	StarPlus	

== Awards and nominations ==
Year	Nominated work	Category	Result
Filmfare Awards
1994	Aaina	Best Supporting Actress	Won
2006	Kalyug	Best Performance in a Negative Role	Nominated
2015	2 States	Best Supporting Actress	Nominated
2020	Badla	Best Supporting Actress	Nominated
IIFA Awards
2006	Kalyug	Best Performance in a Negative Role	Nominated
2015	2 States	Best Supporting Actress	Nominated
2021	Badla	Best Supporting Actress	Nominated
Indian Telly Awards
2005	Kkavyanjali	Best Actress in a Negative Role (Popular)	Nominated
2005	Kkavyanjali	Best Actress in a Negative Role (Jury)	Won
Producers Guild Film Awards
2015	2 States	Best Actress in a Supporting Role	Nominated
Screen Awards
2019	Badla	Best Supporting Actress	Nominated
Zee Cine Awards
2003	23rd March 1931: Shaheed	Best Actor in a Supporting Role – Female	Nominated
2006	Kalyug	Best Performance in a Negative Role	Nominated
2020	Badla	Best Actor in a Supporting Role – Female	Nominated
