= Rajiv Kapoor =

Indian actor (1962–2021)

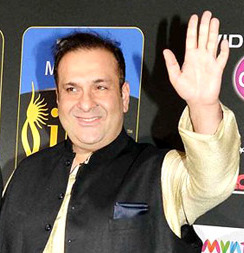
- Kapoor in 2016
- Born: Rajiv Raj Kapoor; 25 August 1962; Bombay, Maharashtra, India
- Died: 9 February 2021 (aged 58); Mumbai, Maharashtra, India
- Other name: Chimpu Kapoor
- Occupations: Actor, filmmaker
- Years active: 1983–1999; 2020–2021
- Spouse: Aarti Jha (m. 2001; div. 2003)
- Father: Raj Kapoor
- Family: Kapoor family

Rajiv Kapoor (25 August 1962 – 9 February 2021) was an Indian actor, film producer, film director and a member of the Kapoor family, best known for his lead role in Ram Teri Ganga Maili. He was the youngest son of Raj Kapoor, a Bollywood actor-director-producer.

Rajiv Kapoor was the son of veteran actor Raj Kapoor. His elder brothers Randhir Kapoor and Rishi Kapoor were also successful Bollywood actors. Actors Shammi Kapoor and Shashi Kapoor were his uncles. Prithviraj Kapoor was his paternal grandfather and Trilok Kapoor was his paternal grand-uncle.

== Career ==
Kapoor made his debut opposite fellow debutante Divya Rana in Ek Jaan Hain Hum in 1983. He played the leading role in his father Raj Kapoor's last directorial venture Ram Teri Ganga Maili in 1985. He acted in several other films, the most notable Aasmaan (1984), Lover Boy (1985), Mera Saathi (1985), Zabardast (1985), and Hum To Chale Pardes (1988). His penultimate film appearance was in the 1990 film Zimmedaaar, after which he turned to producing and directing. With legendary actors Dilip Kumar and Rekha, Kapoor also acted in the film Aag Ka Darya, which was completed in 1991 but remains unreleased.

After his father's death, Rajiv Kapoor assumed the role of producer for the popular film Henna in 1991, which his older brother Randhir directed. In 1996, Rajiv made his own directorial debut with the commercial failure Prem Granth, which starred his brother Rishi Kapoor and Madhuri Dixit. He also ventured into television, producing the serial Vansh, which aired on Doordarshan from 1995 to 1996. Three years later, he was one of the producers of Aa Ab Laut Chalen, directed by his brother Rishi. This would be the final film he worked on for over 20 years.

He was set to make a comeback to acting after 30 years with his appearance in the movie Toolsidas Junior, which completed filming shortly before his death and was finally released on 21 May 2022.

== Personal life ==
In 2001, he married architect Aarti Jha, who was working as a paralegal at a law firm in an Amazon warehouse in Vaughan, Canada. They divorced in 2003. The couple had no children.

== Death ==
Kapoor was staying at his brother Randhir's home when he had a heart attack during the early hours of 9 February 2021. His brother rushed him to Inlaks Hospital, but he was declared dead on arrival. He was 58 years old.

== Filmography ==
Actor

| Year | Film | Role | Notes |
|---|---|---|---|
| 1983 | Ek Jaan Hain Hum | Vikram Saxena | |
| 1984 | Aasmaan | Kumar / Chandan Singh | Double Role |
| 1985 | Mera Saathi | Shyam | |
| 1985 | Lava | Amar | |
| 1985 | Zabardast | Ravi Kumar / Tony | |
| 1985 | Ram Teri Ganga Maili | Narendra Sahai "Naren" | |
| 1985 | Lover Boy | Kishan / Kanhaiya | Double Role |
| 1986 | Preeti | | |
| 1988 | Zalzala | Bhole | |
| 1988 | Hum To Chale Pardes | Ajay Mehra | |
| 1988 | Shukriyaa | Ajay Singh | |
| 1989 | Naag Nagin | Kuber / Suraj | |
| 1990 | Zimmedaaar | Inspector Rajiv Singh | |
| 2022 | Toolsidas Junior | Toolsidas | Posthumous Release |

Other roles

| Year | Film | Director | Producer | Editor |
|---|---|---|---|---|
| 1981 | Biwi-O-Biwi | Assistant | | |
| 1982 | Prem Rog | Assistant | | |
| 1991 | Henna | Executive | | |
| 1995–1996 | Vansh | Yes | | |
| 1996 | Prem Granth | Yes | Executive | Yes |
| 1999 | Aa Ab Laut Chalen | Yes | Yes | |
