= Anita Raj =

Indian film and television actress (born 1963)

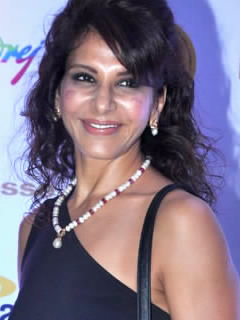
- Anita Raj in October 2013
- Born: Anita Raj Khurana; 28 February 1963 (age 63); Mumbai, Maharashtra, India
- Occupation: actress
- Years active: 1981–2000; 2007–present
- Known for: Ek Tha Raja Ek Thi Rani; Choti Sarrdaarni; Yeh Rishta Kya Kehlata Hai "Tumhari Pakhi"
- Notable work: Ghulami
- Spouse: Sunil Hingorani (m. 1986)
- Children: 1
- Father: Jagdish Raj

Anita Raj Khurana (born 28 February 1963) is an Indian actress and the daughter of well-known actor Jagdish Raj. Her notable films include Prem Geet (1981), Zara Si Zindagi (1983), Naukar Biwi Ka (1983), Zameen Aasman (1984), Ghulami (1985) and Mazloom (1986). Anita is also known for playing Priyamvada Singh in the TV Series Ek Tha Raja Ek Thi Rani and Kulwant Kaur Dhillon in Choti Sarrdaarni. Currently she is seen as Kaveri Poddar in Yeh Rishta Kya Kehlata Hai.

== Filmography ==
=== Film ===
†	Denotes films that have not yet been released		
Year	Film	Role	Notes
1981	Prem Geet	Shikha	Debut
1982	Mehndi Rang Layegi	Padma	
1982	Dulha Bikta Hai	Shayla	
1983	Zara Si Zindagi	Kusum	
1983	Prem Tapasya	Anita	
1983	Kaun? Kaisey?	Preeti	
1983	Naukar Biwi Ka	Jyoti Nath 'Rani'	
1983	Achha Bura	Rita Roy	
1983	Jeet Hamaari	Anita	
1983	Thai Veedu	Anita	Tamil version of Jeet Hamari
1984	Bad Aur Badnam	Dr. Anita Mathur	
1984	Zameen Aasmaan	Anita	
1984	Lakhon Ki Baat	Shobha Prakash	
1984	Laila	Padmini	
1984	Andar Baahar	Uncredited	Cameo
1984	Jeene Nahi Doonga	Bijli	
1984	Ab Ayega Mazaa	Nupur	
1985	Karm Yudh	Usha Saxena	
1985	Masterji	Shobha	
1985	Ghulami	Tulsi	
1985	Jaan Ki Baazi	Geeta	
1985	Lover Boy	Bijli	
1985	Zulm Ka Badla	Geeta Verma/Mrs. Dsouza	
1985	Yaar Kasam		
1985	Karishma Kudrat Kaa	Paro	
1985	Bihari Babu		
1986	Ilzaam	Kamal	
1986	Kala Dhanda Goray Log	Sandhya	
1986	Pyar Kiya Hai Pyar Karenge	Shobha	
1986	Teesra Kinara		
1986	Mazloom	Purnima (Poonam)	
1986	Asli Naqli	Anita	
1986	Ek Aur Sikander	Shama	
1986	Mohabbat Ki Kasam	Shop owner's wife	Cameo
1986	Mera Haque	Bijli	
1986	Jwala	Mastani	
1987	Insaniyat Ke Dushman	Shashi	
1987	Hawalaat	Salma/Shamim Khan	
1987	Satyamev Jayate	College Lecturer Vidya	
1987	Hiraasat	Renu	
1987	Insaf Ki Pukar	Police Inspector Sheela	
1988	Anjaam khuda jaane		
1988	Sagar Sangam	Subitra	
1988	Shiv Shakti	Dolly	
1988	Mera Muqaddar	Dancer (Uncredited)	Cameo
1988	Ghar Ghar Ki Kahani	Deepa	
1988	Mahaveera	Dancer	Cameo
1988	Paap Ko Jalaa Kar Raakh Kar Doonga	Vandana	
1988	Paanch Fauladi	Annu	
1988	Zalzala	Sheela	
1988	Saazish	Roma	
1989	Asmaan Se Ooncha	Anita Malik	
1989	Nafrat Ki Aandhi	Radha	
1989	Do Yaar		
1989	Clerk	Pooja	
1989	Billoo Badshah	Asha	
1989	Abhimanyu	Lalita	
1989	Taaqatwar	Anju Khurana	
1989	Jurrat	Julie	
1989	Pati Patni Aur Tawaif	Film star Kiran	Cameo
1990	Hum Se Na Takrana	Sundari	
1990	Zimmedaaar	Anita	
1990	Sher Dil	Kiran Kailashnath	
1990	Khatarnaak	Helena	
1990	Atishbaz	Reshma	
1991	Kasam Kali Ki	Bijlee/Roopa	
1991	Kaun Kare Kurbanie	Anita Singh	
1991	Swarg Jaisaa Ghar	Savitri	
1991	Maut Ki Sazaa	Jyotsna	
1991	Jasa Baap Tashi Poore	Doctor Anita	Marathi movie
1992	Adharm	Sharda	
1992	Virodhi	Mrs. Shekhar	
1992	Mehndi Shagna Di	Rano	
1993	Saboot Mangta Hain Kanoon	Anita	
1994	Ghar Ki Izzat	Sheela	
1995	Faisla Main Karungi	Jenny	
1996	Gehra Raaz		
2007	Thodi Life Thoda Magic	Ashima Singhania	
2012	Chaar Din Ki Chandni	Devika Singh	
2019	Bagaavat		
2019	Yaaram	Vijeta Bajaj	
2019	Mudda 370 J&K	Aasma's mother	
2019	Deendayal Ek Yugpurush	Lata Khanna	
2023	Lafzon Mein Pyaar	Durga Bhabhi	
2025	Mere Husband Ki Biwi	Antra's Mother	
2026	Hum Mein Shahenshah Koun †		Delayed release after 37 years - scheduled for APRIL

=== Television ===
Year	Title	Role	Notes	Ref.
1986	Festivals of India	Presenter		
1998–1999	Ashiqui	Anita		
1999	Maya	Maya		
2000	Eeena Meena Deeka			
2013; 2016	24	Naina Singhania		
2014	Tumhari Pakhi	Anuja/Devki Rathore		
2015–2017	Ek Tha Raja Ek Thi Rani	Priyamvada Devvadan Singh Deo		
2019–2022	Choti Sarrdaarni	Kulwant Kaur Dhillon		
2022	Parineetii	Kulwant Kaur Dhillon		
2023	Saavi Ki Savaari	Kumud Dalmiya Agarwal		
2023–present	Yeh Rishta Kya Kehlata Hai	Kaveri Poddar		
