= Dasari Swaroop Kumar =

Indian cricketer (born 1986)

Personal information
- Born: 7 May 1986 (age 38); Vijayawada, India
- Source: ESPNcricinfo, 30 January 2017

Dasari Swaroop Kumar (born 7 May 1986) is an Indian cricketer. He made his List A debut for Andhra in the 2008–09 Vijay Hazare Trophy on 21 February 2009. He made his first-class debut on 4 February 2020, for Andhra in the 2019–20 Ranji Trophy.
