= Shatrughan Sinha filmography =

The following is the complete filmography of Indian actor, singer, and producer Shatrughan Sinha.

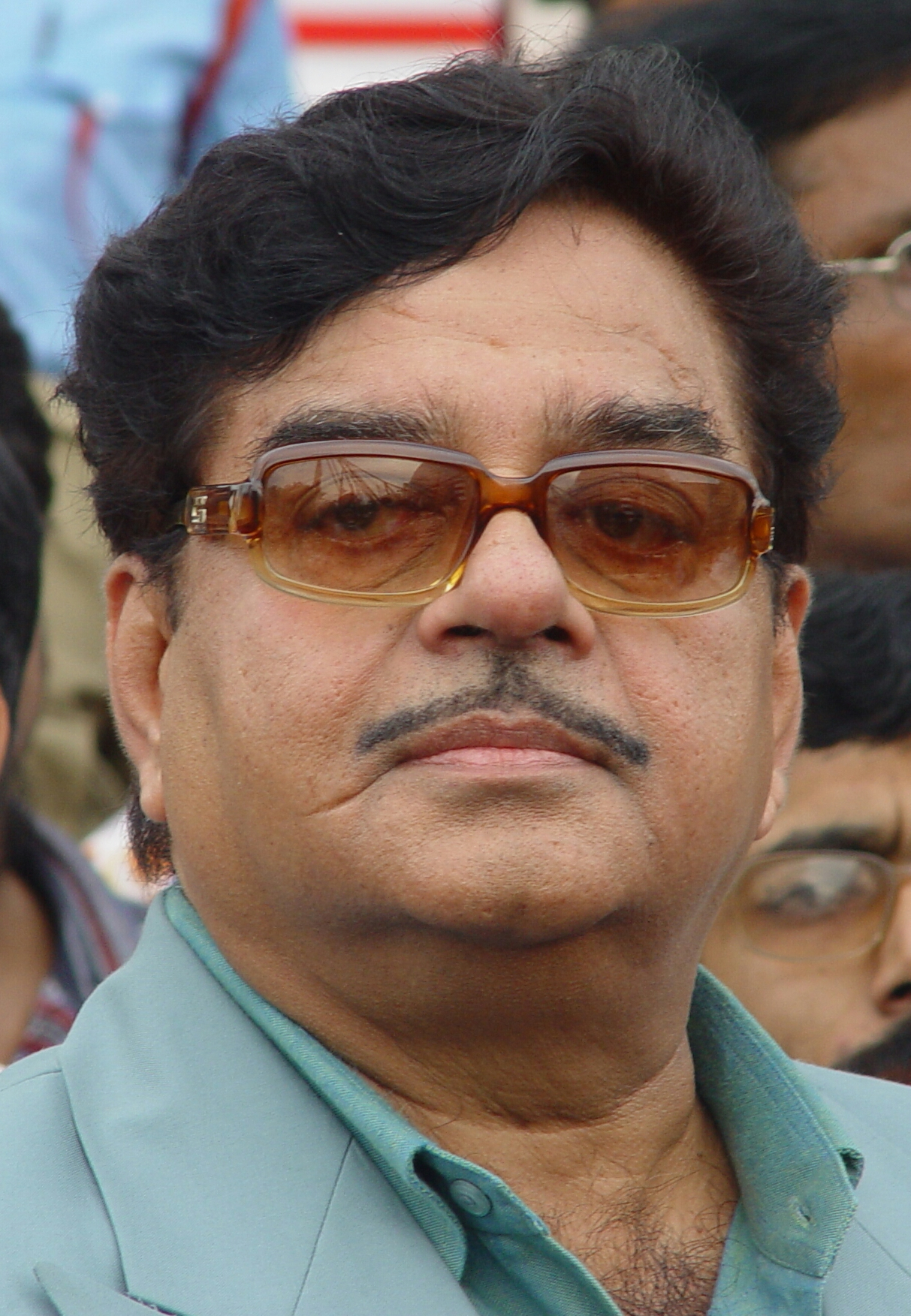

== Films ==
Year	Film	Role	Notes
1967	The Train	Passenger	
1967	And Unto the Void		
1968	Maya	Desai	TV Series
1969	Pyar Hi Pyar	Villain	First film
1969	Sajan	Constable Tiwari	
1970	Raaton Ka Raja		
1970	Khilona	Bihari	
1970	Holi Ayee Re	Suresh	
1970	Ek Nanhi Munni Ladki Thi		
1970	Chetna	Ramesh	
1970	Prem Pujari	Pakistani Army Officer	
1971	Parwana	Public Prosecutor	Guest appearance
1971	Paras	Thakur Arjun Singh	
1971	Mere Apne	Chheno	
1971	Guddi	Himself	Guest appearance
1971	Khoj	Amar	
1971	Gambler	Banke Bihari	
1971	Ek Nari Ek Brahmachari	Rajkumar S. Chaudhary	
1971	Dost Aur Dushman	Himself	Special appearance
1971	Do Raha	Himself	Special appearance
1971	Banphool	Ajay	
1971	Chingari	Jaggi	
1972	Shararat	Jagdish / Vinod Kumar	
1972	Shaadi Ke Baad	Chaudhary Bishan Swaroop Singh	
1972	Rivaaj	Ranjeet	
1972	Raaste Kaa Patthar	Arun Thakur	
1972	Jaban	Himself	Guest appearance
1972	Do Yaar	Jugal Kishore/Jagira	
1972	Buniyaad	Balveer Kumar Sinha	
1972	Bhai Ho To Aisa	Ram	
1972	Babul Ki Galiyaan	Dinesh	
1972	Bombay to Goa	Sharma	Villain
1972	Raampur Ka Lakshman	Ram Bhargav/Kumar	
1972	Milap	Raju	
1973	Shareef Budmaash	Kanhaiyalal/Rocky	Guest appearance
1973	Samjhauta	Shankar	
1973	Sabak		
1973	Pyar Ka Rishta	Dharamdas	
1973	Kashmakash	Inspector Sinha	
1973	Heera	Balwant	
1973	Ghulam Begum Badshah	Thakur Pratap	
1973	Gaai Aur Gori	Arun	25th Film
1973	Ek Nari Do Roop	Vishal	
1973	Chhalia	Sharma	
1973	Blackmail	Jeevan	
1973	Jheel Ke Us Paar	Dr. J. P. Tandon	
1973	Aa Gale Lag Jaa	Dr. Amar	
1974	Shaitaan	Inspector Anand/Ashok	Double role
1974	Badla	Raju/Kumar	
1974	Dost	Gopichand Sharma "Gopi"	
1975	Kahtey Hain Mujhko Raja	CID Inspector Shankar	
1975	Jaggu	Jagtap "Jaggu"	
1975	Do Thug	Madan / Ravi	
1975	Anokha	Ram/Anokha/Shambhu Khanna	
1976	Santo Banto	Karma	Special appearance
1976	Sangram	Shankar/Sangram	50th Film
1976	Kalicharan	DSP Prabhakar/Kalicharan	Double role
1976	Khaan Dost	Rehmat Khan	
1976	Do Shatru		
1977	Yaarron Ka Yaar	Pratap / Shera	
1977	Shirdi Ke Sai Baba	Heera	
1977	Sat Sri Akal		
1977	Safed Haathi	Emperor	
1977	Naami Chor		
1977	Ab Kya Hoga	Ram Sinha	
1977	Aadmi Sadak Ka	Abdul	
1977	Kotwal Saab	Inspector Bharat Pratap Sinha	
1977	Thief of Baghdad	Hameed "Mehmood"	
1978	Parmatma	Anand	
1978	Dillagi	Advocate Shekhar	
1978	Chor Ho To Aisa	Sanju / Shankar	
1978	Bhookh	Dr. Ajay	
1978	Atithee	Navendu Kumar	
1978	Amar Shakti	Bada Kumar Shakti Singh	
1978	Vishwanath	Advocate Vishwanath	
1979	Muqabla	Chhaganlal "Chheno"	
1979	Magroor	Ranjeet Sinha / Raju	
1979	Jaani Dushman	Shera	
1979	Heera-Moti	Vijay / Heera	
1979	Bagula Bhagat		
1979	Atmaram	Ranjeet / Atmaram	
1979	Gautam Govinda	Govinda	75th Film
1979	Kaala Patthar	Mangal Singh	
1980	Bombay 405 Miles	Kishan	
1980	Be-Reham	Inspector Chandramohan Sharma "Chander"	
1980	Choron Ki Baaraat	Shekhar	
1980	Chambal Ki Kassam	Inspector Ritu Daman Singh	
1980	Dostana	Advocate Ravi Kapoor	
1980	Shaan	Rakesh	
1980	Jwalamukhi	Rajesh	
1981	Putt Jattan De	Jagga	Punjabi film
1981	Kranti	Kareem Khan	
1981	Naram Garam	Kalishankar Bajpai "Babua"	
1981	Chehre Pe Chehra	Advocate Sinha	
1981	Naseeb	Vikram "Vicky"	
1982	Log Kya Kahenge	Ram Sinha	
1982	Do Ustad	Shiva	
1982	Dil-E-Nadaan	Vikram	
1982	Haathkadi	SSP Sunil/Bholanath Banarasi	
1982	Teesri Ankh	Sagar	
1983	Mangal Pandey	Mangal Pandey / Tiger	
1983	Taqdeer	Shiva	
1983	Kalka	Kalka	Also producer
1983	Daulat Ke Dushman	Shukla R.R.	
1983	Chor Police	Inspector Sunil Rana	
1983	Ganga Meri Maa	Ram	
1983	Qayamat	SP Kamal	
1984	Sharara	Vicky	
1984	Bhemaa	Inspector Bheem Singh	100th Film
1984	Qaidi	ASP Dinesh Jugran	
1984	Paapi Pet Ka Sawaal Hai		
1984	Meraa Dost Meraa Dushman	Shakti Singh	
1984	Jeene Nahi Doonga	Shaka	
1984	The Gold Medal	Shatrughan	
1984	Dhokebaaz	Rocky	
1984	Bad Aur Badnaam	Ashwini Kumar	
1984	Aaj Ka M.L.A. Ram Avtar	Kranti Kumar	
1984	Maati Maangey Khoon	Harinarayan Singh "Hariya"	
1985	Phaansi Ke Baad	Public Prosecutor Vijay	
1985	Kali Basti	Karan Singh	
1985	Kaala Sooraj	Karan	
1985	Hoshiyar	Rajesh	
1985	Bhawani Junction	Ram	
1985	Ameer Aadmi Gharib Aadmi	Advocate Ashok Saxena	
1985	Aandhi-Toofan	Raghunath Shastri "Raghu"	
1985	Ramkali	Inspector Sultan Singh	
1985	Yudh	Moinuddin Khan	
1985	Telephone	Suresh Saxena	
1985	Bihari Babu		Also producer; Bhojpuri film
1986	Samay Ki Dhaara	Ajay Verma	125th Film
1986	Jwala	Jwala Dutt	
1986	Qatl	Inspector Shatru	
1986	Ilzaam	Inspector Suraj Prasad	
1986	Asli Naqli	Vijay	
1987	Maha Yatra	Chaandhal	
1987	Khudgarz	Bihari Bhuvaneshwar Prasad Sinha	
1987	Jawab Hum Denge	Vijay Saxena	
1987	Hiraasat	ACP Ashok Saxena	
1987	Hawalaat	CID Inspector Sikandar Ali Khan/Gullu Badshah	
1987	Antarjali Jatra	Baiju	Bengali film
1987	Insaniyat Ke Dushman	Advocate Kailashnath	
1987	Loha	Qasim Ali Barkat Ali Jung Shamsher Bahadur	
1987	Aag Hi Aag	ACP Suraj Singh	
1987	Raahee	Preetam	
1988	Zalzala	Shankar "Benaam"	
1988	Shiva-Shakti	Shiva	
1988	Sagar Sangam	Inspector Arjun Sharma	
1988	Mulzim	Inspector Neeraj Kumar	
1988	Khoon Bhari Maang	J. D.	
1988	Gunahon Ka Faisla	Birju	
1988	Dharamyudh	Pratap Singh	
1988	Dharam Shatru		
1988	Sherni	Inspector Rajan	150th Film
1988	Mahaveera	Vijay Verma	
1988	Ganga Tere Desh Mein	Inspector Ajay	
1989	Saaya	Ravi	
1989	Kaanoon Ki Awaaz	Raghunath Prasad Rai	
1989	Jurrat	Inspector Ram Singh	
1989	Santosh	Avinash	
1989	Aakhri Baazi	Prashant Kumar "P. K."	
1989	Na-Insaafi	Vijay Sinha	
1989	Billoo Badshah	Billoo Badshah	
1989	Gola Barood	Shambhu	
1989	Shehzaade	Suraj Singh	
1989	Zakham	Arjun	
1989	Hum Mein Shahenshah Koun	TBA	Unreleased
1990	Vidrohi	Devendra Pratap Singh	
1990	Karishma Kali Kaa	CID Inspector Shiva	
1990	Aandhiyan	Dushyant	
1990	Atishbaz	Shera	
1990	Hum Se Na Takrana	Badshah	
1991	Kasba	Dhani	
1991	Iraada	Ashok Sinha	
1991	Ranbhoomi	Roopa Singh	
1992	Adharm	ACP Avinash Verma	
1993	Aulad Ke Dushman	Rajan Chaudhary	
1994	Insaaf Apne Lahoo Se	Devilal "Deva"	175th Film
1994	Betaaj Badshah	Parshuram / Prashant	
1994	Chaand Kaa Tukdaa	CID Inspector Shatrughan Sinha	
1994	Prem Yog	Narrator	
1994	Patang	Rabbani	
1995	Zamaana Deewana	Suraj Pratap Singh	
1995	Taaqat	Anand "Lalbagh Ka Bhau"	
1996	Dil Tera Diwana	Kumar	
1996	Hukumnama	Himself	Special appearance
1996	Agni Prem	Shankar	
1998	Deewana Hoon Pagal Nahi		
1998	Zulm-O-Sitam	Advocate Vishwanath	
1999	Shaheed Uddham Singh: Alais Ram Mohammad Singh Azad	Muhammad Khan	
2000	Papa the Great	Biharilal	
2002	Bharat Bhagya Vidhata	Home Minister Mahendra Suryavanshi	
2004	Aan: Men at Work	Senior Inspector Vikram Singh	
2008	Yaar Meri Zindagi	Thakur Vikram Singh	
2008	Dashavatar	Narrator	
2010	Aaj Phir Jeene Ki Tamanna Hai		
2010	Rakta Charitra	Konda Shivaji Rao	
2010	Rakta Charitra 2	Konda Shivaji Rao	
2013	Mahabharat	Lord Krishna (voice)	
2018	Yamla Pagla Deewana: Phir Se	Judge Sunil Sinha	
2026	Woh Aadmi Bahut Kuch Janta Tha		
