= Vinay Kumar Sinha =

Indian film producer (c.1946–2020)

- Born: c. 1946
- Died: 24 January 2020 (aged 74)
- Occupation: Producer

Vinay Kumar Sinha (also written as Vinay Sinha; c. 1946 – 24 January 2020) was an Indian producer. He was the vice president of Indian Motion Picture Producers' Association.

== Biography ==
Sinha was the producer of Chor Police which was released in 1983. Amjad Khan made his directorial debut with this film. He also produced Andaz Apna Apna. This film received a cult classic status among the Hindi film audiences. Besides these films he also produced films like Ameer Aadmi Gharib Aadmi and Naseeb. He also produced a few television shows.

Sinha died on 24 January 2020 at the age of 74.

== Selected filmography ==
- Chor Police (1983)
- Ameer Aadmi Gharib Aadmi (1985)
- Andaz Apna Apna (1994)
- Naseeb (1997)
