= Aapas Ki Baat (film) =

- CD Cover
- Directed by: Harmesh Malhotra
- Written by: Ravi Kapoor; Mohan Kaul
- Produced by: Salim Akhtar; Shama Akhtar
- Starring: Raj Babbar; Poonam Dhillon
- Cinematography: V. Durga Prasad
- Music by: Songs: Anu Malik; Lyrics: Anjaan
- Release date: 21 November 1981
- Running time: 148 minutes
- Country: India
- Language: Hindi

Aapas Ki Baat is a 1981 Bollywood action romance film directed by Harmesh Malhotra. The movie starred Raj Babbar, Poonam Dhillon, Shakti Kapoor in lead roles.

== Plot ==
This is the love story of Kajal and Anand. Kajal's mother and brother Vinod refuses to accept her affairs but Kajal marry Anand. Later Anand is accused in a serious crime and disappears. Years later a person comes back looking exactly like Anand.

== Cast ==
- Raj Babbar as Anand Shrivastav
- Poonam Dhillon as Kajal Sinha
- Shakti Kapoor as Shyam Shrivastav
- Dina Pathak as Mrs. Sinha
- Purnima as Laxmi Shrivastav
- Abhi Bhattacharya as Seth Narayandas
- Jankidas as Laxmi's neighbour's
- Bhushan Tiwari as Kalia
- Bharat Kapoor as Vinod Sinha
- Madhu Malhotra as Aarti
- Narendranath as Bosco
- Asrani as Bhola
- Kalpana Iyer as Roopa
- Huma Khan as Kalpana
- Baby Khushboo as Roshni, the girl who falls from the boat.

== Soundtrack ==
Aapas Ki Baat

Soundtrack album by Anu Malik
- Released: 1981
- Recorded: 1981
- Genre: Film soundtrack
- Label: His Master's Voice

Anu Malik chronology
Poonam (1980)	Aapas Ki Baat (1981)	Paagal Premee (1982)

Song	Singer
"Tera Chehra Mujhe Gulaab"	Kishore Kumar
"Rang Ude, Rangon Mein Dil Dooba, Rangeela Dil Dhunde"	Kishore Kumar, Asha Bhosle
"Phool Rahon Mein"	Suman Kalyanpur
"Kehni Hai Tumse Do Baaten, Kahunga Magar"	Lata Mangeshkar, Shailendra Singh
"Sun O Dilruba Dil Ki Sada"	Asha Bhosle

== Trivia ==
- Debut of Huma Khan.
- Baby Khushboo plays the role of Roshni who is suffering from blood cancer. She played similar role in the movie 'Dard ka Rishta (1982)' in which also she is shown to suffer from blood cancer.
- In one scene, Shakti Kapoor hums the song 'Sama hai Suhana Suhana' which is from the movie Ghar Ghar ki Kahani (1970).
- The climax scene is shot in Jay Coach Factory, Mumbai where bus bodies were built.
