= Beti (1969 film) =

- Directed by: Harmesh Malhotra
- Written by: Ravi Kapoor
- Produced by: K P Singh
- Starring: Sanjay Khan; Nanda
- Cinematography: V. Durga Prasad
- Edited by: Bhaskar Rao
- Music by: Sonik Omi
- Distributed by: K.P.S. Films
- Release date: 1969
- Country: India
- Language: Hindi

Beti (transl. Daughter) is a 1969 Hindi drama film starring Sanjay Khan, Nanda and Kamini Kaushal in lead roles.

== Cast ==
- Sanjay Khan as Dr. Rajesh Anand
- Nanda as Sudha Verma
- Kishore Sahu as Mr. Verma
- Kamini Kaushal as Mrs. Verma
- Shyama as Mrs. Kamla Verma
- Rajendra Nath as Deepak
- Sarika Young Sudha

== Story ==
Mr. Verma (Kishore Sahu) a widower has two children: toddler Munna (Master Rippy) and elder Sudha (Baby Sarika). Sudha still a baby herself, but she looks after her father and Munna. While cooking she burns her foot. Mr. Verma remarries to Kamla (Shyama). She behaves like a typical stepmother. Misery strike them as Munna drowns while climbing a well.

Growing in such unfriendly environment, she (Nanda) becomes a secretary in an office. She meets Rajesh (Sanjay Khan) in a situation where he almost runs her over. Later she gets engaged to his friend Sudhir thinking that she is engaged to Rajesh, in an alliance settled by their parents. She tells him the same and both blissfully ignorant of the fact make merry. When the fact is known Sudha decides to marry Sudhir to save honour of the family. Mr Verma sells his house for 40,000 rupees to give dowry, which Kamla steals. The groom and marriage party returns on not getting dowry. Mr. Verma gets a stroke and is paralyzed. Kamla abandons them and Sudha takes care of her father. Both spend time in misery and hunger. Meanwhile, Sanjay on knowing that Sudha's marriage has been called off, come looking for her. Mr. Verma thinking himself a burden goes off and Sudha thinks he has died.

== Music ==
The music of the film was composed by Sonik Omi and lyrics by Shakeel Badayuni.

Song	Singer
"Yeh Kya Kiya Re Duniyawale"	Mukesh
"Aaja Nindiya Suhani" (Happy)	Lata Mangeshkar
"Aaja Nindiya Suhani" (Sad)	Lata Mangeshkar
"Shyam Dhoon Lagi, Hari Naam Dhoon Lagi"	Lata Mangeshkar
"Lehenga Manga De Mere Babu"	Asha Bhosle, Usha Mangeshkar
"Ek Meethi Nazar Phool Barsa Gayi"	Asha Bhosle, Mohammed Rafi
"Haseen Zulfon Ka Rang De Do"	Mohammed Rafi
"Mere Mehboob, Tu Mujhko Na Bana"	Mohammed Rafi
