= Naseeb (1998 film) =

- Directed by: Kirti Kumar
- Written by: Aadesh K. Arjun (dialogues)
- Screenplay by: Shaka Sampang
- Story by: Shaka Sampang
- Produced by: Vinay Kumar Sinha; Shanti Sinha
- Starring: Govinda; Mamta Kulkarni; Kader Khan; Rahul Roy
- Cinematography: S.M. Anwar
- Edited by: V.N. Mayekar
- Music by: Nadeem-Shravan
- Production company: Vinay Pictures
- Release date: 18 December 1998
- Running time: 138 minutes
- Country: India
- Language: Hindi

Naseeb is a 1998 Indian Hindi romantic drama film directed by Kirti Kumar and produced by Vinay Kumar Sinha. It stars Govinda, Mamta Kulkarni and Rahul Roy in lead roles while Ajit Vachani, Shakti Kapoor, Kader Khan appear in supporting roles.

== Plot ==
The film starts with an inebriated Krishna Prasad who is attempting suicide, but is interrupted by Chaban who stops him. Krishna befriends Chaban and helps him with his business. Deepak Bajaj comes in for a job interview with Krishna's company and is hired.

One day Deepak's car has a problem, and Krishna takes him to his home where he sees Pooja, wife of Deepak. In a flashback it is revealed that Krishna is a car mechanic and Pooja is going to a party with her friends. Her car has a problem and Krishna fixes it. Pooja then takes Krishna home. The two keep in touch, and eventually fall in love. Pooja's father, Din Dayal, meets Krishna and offers him money so he can open his factory. However, Krishna refuses, and decides that he will only marry Pooja when he has become a successful businessman. During this time he writes to Pooja telling her to forget him. Pooja is heartbroken. When Krishna returns, he is also heartbroken to see Pooja has married another man. On Krishna's birthday, Deepak and Pooja are invited to his party. Pooja is surprised to see Krishna's mansion, since it has every feature that she wanted and she had told to Krishna. Deepak and Pooja meet Krishna, and while everyone is dancing Krishna tries to kiss Pooja. This enrages Deepak who slaps Krishna. Krishna then apologizes to Pooja. Deepak insults Krishna, who gets enraged and fights with Deepak and gets him arrested on charges of embezzling money.

Deepak's father begs Krishna to release Deepak, but Krishna tells him that he wants Pooja in return. This infuriates Deepak's father. Pooja thinks that Krishna wants to sleep with her, but Krishna slaps her and tells her that he only loves her and he did all this just so that she can understand his feelings.

Krishna releases Deepak who kicks Pooja out of his house. Master Chaban then takes her to his house. Chaban goes to Dharamdas and learns that he burnt the second letter. Chaban goes to Krishna, who takes Pooja to Deepak and tells him how much Pooja loves Deepak, but Deepak rejects the story. Krishna commits suicide by shooting himself and dies in the arms of Deepak and Pooja.

== Cast ==
- Govinda as Krishna Prasad
- Rahul Roy as Deepak Bajaj
- Mamta Kulkarni as Pooja Dayal
- Ajit Vachani as Din Dayal
- Beena Banerjee as Mrs. Din Dayal
- Shakti Kapoor as Lalli
- Dinesh Tiloo as Lallis' friend
- Kader Khan as Master Chaban
- Saeed Jaffrey as Dharamdas Bajaj
- Sudha Chandran

== Soundtrack ==
The film was average in terms of collection, however, its soundtrack was very popular. The Lyrics was written by Sameer and Music composed by Nadeem-Shravan. Most popular songs in album "Shikwa Nahin Kisi Se", "Tumhi Ne Meri Zindagi", "Chanda Sitare".

And songs sang by Kumar Sanu, Udit Narayan, Alka Yagnik, Anuradha Paudwal, Kavita Krishnamurthy and Babul Supriyo.

| # | Title | Singer(s) |
|---|---|---|
| 1 | "Chaanda Sitare" | Udit Narayan, Alka Yagnik |
| 2 | "Churaa Lenge" | Kumar Sanu, Anuradha Paudwal |
| 3 | "Kabhi Jo Bhoolna Chahoon" | Kumar Sanu |
| 4 | "Seene Pe" | Udit Narayan, Kavita Krishnamurthy |
| 5 | "Shikwa Nahin Kisi Se" | Kumar Sanu |
| 6 | "Tumhi Ne Meri Zindagi" | Babul Supriyo |
