= Parveen Babi =

Indian actress (1954–2005)

- Babi in Amar Akbar Anthony (1977)
- Born: Parveen Sultana Wali Mohammad Khanji Babi; 4 April 1954; Junagadh, Saurashtra, India
- Died: 20 January 2005 (aged 50); Mumbai, Maharashtra, India
- Resting place: Juhu Muslim Cemetery, Santa Cruz, Mumbai
- Education: St. Xavier's College (BA, MA)
- Occupations: Actress; model
- Years active: 1971–1993

Signature
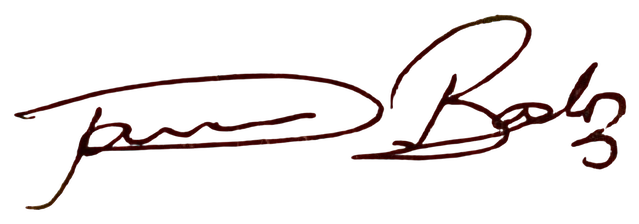

Parveen Sultana Wali Mohammad Khanji Babi (pronounced [ˈpəɾʋin ˈbɑbi]; 4 April 1954 – 20 January 2005) was an Indian actress and model, who worked in Hindi films. One of the highest-paid actresses of the 1970s and the 1980s, she appeared in over 70 films and was the first Bollywood star to appear on the cover of Time magazine. She was known for her glamorous acting style, her modelling and fashion, and was often cited in the media as a sex symbol. (Note: Attributed to multiple sources)

Babi was born in 1954, into the Babi Dynasty. She was educated at St. Xavier's College and began her modeling career in 1971. Two years later, she made her acting debut in the film Charitra. She became popular in the mid-1970s, with notable roles in films like Majboor and Deewaar. Over the following years, she appeared in several of the highest-grossing Indian films, including Kaala Sona, Amar Akbar Anthony, Suhaag, Kaala Patthar, Shaan, Kranti, Kaalia and Namak Halaal. The film Irada released in 1991, was her final film before she retired from the film industry.

Babi's personal life received much attention. She remained unmarried after a string of relationships with Danny Denzongpa, Kabir Bedi and Mahesh Bhatt. She was believed to have been diagnosed with paranoid schizophrenia, which came to the attention of the public, following various incidents. On 20 January 2005, she died at the age of 50, in her apartment in Mumbai. An autopsy stated that she died from organ failure and diabetes.

== Early life ==
"Kabir, my childhood has been one dark fearful journey. As a child, I was unable to get or maybe receive the kind of love I needed. I never felt at home in my home. I was unable to communicate with people around me, and people around me were too ignorant to understand my kind of child. I felt insecure at every step..."

— Babi on her childhood in a letter to Kabir Bedi

Babi was born on 4 April 1954 in Junagadh, Saurashtra (now in Gujarat), India to an aristocratic family of the Babi dynasty.

Babi's parents belonged to the Babi tribe of Gujarati Pathans. Her father, Wali Mohammed Khan Babi, was an official in the Junagadh State and a relative of Muhammad Mahabat Khan III, the last Nawab of Junagadh. During the partition of India, on 15 August 1947, Mahabat Khan announced that his princely state will join the newly-created Pakistan, however in a referendum held on 20 February 1948, 99.95% of Junagadh's population voted to join independent India. Wali was relieved of his job, land, and title. However, under the Land Acquisition Act, he was offered approximately 100 bighas of agricultural land in the Bamangam village of Gujarat's Anand district. The cultivation of wheat and groundnut on this land served as the majority of the family's income. Babi's mother, Jamal Bakhte Babi, was a distant relative within the Babi clan, and moved from Devgam village in Amreli to Junagadh after her marriage. While she wasn't well-educated, Wali, recognizing her worldly-wiseness, handed over complete control of his Bamangan land to her.

Born 14 years after her parents' marriage, Babi was an only child and grew up in a 54-room haveli maintained by a staff of half-a-dozen people. The family eventually moved to a two-storey mansion in Diwan chowk. Her father died from throat cancer when she was six years old, while her mother died in 2001. She completed her early education at a Gujarati medium school. In 1968, a fourteen-year old Babi enrolled in St. Xavier's College, Ahmedabad for her pre-university course. Her mother was reluctant to send her away from home to study, as educating daughters wasn't a mainstream practice at the time. After months of "begging and cajoling" from Babi, she agreed on the condition that Babi must get engaged and marry in the near future.

As a native speaker of Gujarati, Hindi and Urdu, Babi self-taught herself English in college. She graduated with a Bachelor of Arts degree in English and Psychology and a Master of Arts in English.

== Career ==
=== 1971–1974: Modelling, debut and early roles ===
Babi's modelling career began in 1971, when she was recruited by Jeannie Naoroji, for a fashion show at Calico Dome in September 1971. In 1972, B. R. Ishara having taken notice of Babi and who was watching over the shooting of his film Ek Nao Do Kinare (1973) in Ahmedabad, offered her a role in a film, but he forgot to contact her. Following this, Mamta Sahu, a model working for Naoroji and the daughter of director Kishore Sahu, took notice of Babi's potential and recommended Babi to her father, who was searching for a new cast member, whom he could cast in his film Dhuen Ki Lakeer (1974). Unknown to Sahu, Ishara announced that Babi would make her acting debut in his film Charitra which was released in 1973, opposite cricketer Salim Durrani. Ultimately, Sahu and Ishara reached an agreement, allowing Babi to begin shooting with Sahu, who hired Roshan Taneja to teach her the basics of acting. Babi relocated to Bombay and lived with Sahu and his family while shooting. The two films, released six months apart, performed poorly at the box office.

In Charitra, Babi played Shikha, a college student who is pressured into a sexual relationship with her father's creditor to alleviate her family's financial struggles. Critics praised her; The Illustrated Weekly of India described her as "[having] talent" and Free Press Journal said her "debut is promising." In Ravi Tandon's Majboor (1974), Babi garnered recognition for her role as Neela Rajvansh, it was the first of her many collaborations with actor Amitabh Bachchan.

=== 1974–1976: Breakthrough and career advancement ===
Babi had her breakthrough with her portrayal of Anita, a prostitute, in the action crime film Deewaar (1975), which emerged as one of the year's highest-grossing films in Hindi cinema. Her character was noted for engaging in premarital sex and drinking alcohol, defying societal norms for Indian woman, and helped establish Babi's westernised image. In 1976, she starred opposite Dev Anand in Bullet, opposite Randhir Kapoor in Bhanwar, Mama Bhanja and Mazdoor Zindabaad as well as Rishi Kapoor in Rangila Ratan, but these films were unsuccessful. Yash Chopra had originally cast Babi in Kabhi Kabhie (1976) as Pinky Kapoor, opposite Rishi Kapoor, but she was eventually replaced by Neetu Singh, as Chopra felt she would not look suitable alongside Kapoor.

=== 1976–1983: Established actress ===
Babi appeared in numerous successful films throughout the 1970s and the early 1980s. Notably, she played the leading lady, Jenny, opposite Amitabh Bachchan in Amar Akbar Anthony (1977) and portrayed Anu, opposite Shashi Kapoor in Suhaag (1979). Both films were the highest-grossing releases in India of their respective years. Her box-office success continued with Kaala Patthar (1979) and Namak Halaal (1982) opposite Kapoor, Kaala Sona (1975) opposite Feroz Khan, Chandi Sona (1977) opposite Sanjay Khan, and Jaani Dost (1983) opposite Dharmendra. She was one of the highest-paid actresses at the time, Babi was earning approximately ₹2 to ₹3 lakh per film during that period.

With her then boyfriend, Kabir Bedi, working in European cinema, Babi aspired to do the same and she was cast in the Italian film La tigre è ancora viva: Sandokan alla riscossa! (1977) alongside Bedi, but she decided to quit the film after their breakup. Chopra had also considered Babi and Smita Patil for Silsila (1981), but they were ultimately replaced by Rekha and Jaya Bachchan, respectively. While Chopra stated that Babi took the news well, actor Ranjeet claimed that inside, she was deeply upset by the decision.

In 1982, Babi appeared in offbeat films Dil... Akhir Dil Hai, opposite Naseeruddin Shah and the erotic drama Yeh Nazdeekiyan, opposite Bollywood debutant Marc Zuber. In Yeh Nazdeekiyan, she played a supermodel named Kiran with whom Zuber's character Sunil has an affair. Due to the film's low budget, director Vinod Pande could only afford to pay her ₹1 lakh. Aroon Purie of India Today criticised Babi's performance, remarking that her "acting repertoire in the film ranges from opening her mouth to show happiness and licking her upper lip suggestively to show ecstasy".

Babi's career peaked at the time when most heroines were engulfed in Indian attributes, and Babi was one among the few actresses whose attire was completely westernised, and this provided her a certain latitude many other contemporary female artists were denied in India's heavily male-dominated and misogynistic cinematic fiefdom. Due to this, it was difficult for Bollywood producers to offer her roles as a traditional woman. Due to their similar appearances, she was often compared to her contemporary Zeenat Aman. She shared the screen with Aman in Mahaan (1983) and Ashanti (1982)—the latter inspired by the American television series Charlie's Angels, with Shabana Azmi completing the trio.

Aside from acting, Babi also worked as a model, during her career. She would generally appear on the front page of every film magazine, including Filmfare, The Stardust and Bombay Dyeing. She was also the first Bollywood actress to appear on the front page of Time magazine in July 1976, for which she made history; the cover has since become iconic.

=== 1983–1993: Later career ===
Babi later "disappeared" from the film industry in 1983, not informing anybody about her whereabouts, which caused exaggerated rumours and pompous claims, that she might have been "under the control" of figures in the "underworld". Many of her films were released during the following years, right up until her last film Irada in 1991. She worked as an interior decorator from 1983 to 1992. After leaving the film industry in 1983, she studied music, piano, painting, architecture, literature, writing, cultural and archaeological study, politics, photography, sculpture, and human-rights issues. She also contributed to newspapers and magazines, from 1968 to 1993. She lived in a penthouse apartment in Bombay, living affluently from sound financial investments.

== Personal life ==
=== Religion ===
Born into a Muslim family, Babi was influenced by several religions growing up, including Islam, Hinduism and Christianity. She often questioned certain religious norms, such as eating pork, and believed that morality and kindness were more important than adherence to dogma. She converted to Christianity on 21 June 1997 and was baptised at the All Saints' Church in Malabar Hill.

=== Relationships ===
During her college break in 1969, Babi got engaged to her distant cousin Jamil Khan, a Pakistan International Airlines (PIA) pilot. Amidst the 1971 Indo-Pak war, her mother called off the engagement. A heartbroken Babi received the news through a postcard. (Note: Babi claimed that she could not marry Kabir Bedi because she was once married to Khan, a claim supported by both Bedi and Mahesh Bhatt. She was afraid that if she married again, Khan would return and ruin her career. While attending the Lahore Literary Festival, Hameed Haroon mentioned to Bhatt that a man who claimed to be Babi's husband wanted to meet him.) In 1972, Babi dated Neville Damania, the bassist of the band Purple Flowers, before she relocated to Bombay to pursue a career in the film industry. From 1972 to 1975, she was in a relationship with actor Danny Denzongpa and they lived together in Shivaji Park's Kalumal Estate. After their breakup, Denzongpa remained one of Babi's confidants, but they had a falling out in 1983 after Babi, owing to her paranoid schizophrenia, became convinced that he was an agent of Amitabh Bachchan.

In the summer of 1975, Babi started dating actor Kabir Bedi, who was in an open marriage with his wife Protima Bedi. Within a few weeks, Bedi moved out the apartment he shared with his wife and children to live with Babi. He unsuccessfully tried to divorce Protima for the next two years but she refused. In 1976, following the success of his television series Sandokan, Babi accompanied Bedi on his promotional tour across Italy, Spain and Yugoslavia. In 1977, the couple decided to settle in London, England for the foreseeable future, however Babi called off the relationship and returned to Mumbai three months later. In a conversation with Denzongpa later, she claimed that Bedi had forced her to get an abortion.

In 1978, while rebuilding her career, Babi reconnected with film director Mahesh Bhatt, whom she had first met during the filming of B. R. Ishara's Charitra (1972), and the two began an affair. Six months later, Bhatt separated from his wife Kiran (formerly Lorraine Bright) and moved in with Babi. The relationship lasted two and half years, during which Babi's mental health deteriorated and Bhatt helped her receive psychiatric treatment. He moved back with his wife after the break up.

=== Friendships ===
During Babi's relationship with Kabir Bedi, she initially maintained a cordial relationship with Protima Bedi, but later became possessive over Protima, leading to a falling out between the two. Protima would often ask Babi to look after her two children, while she was in Odisha. She attended Protima's funeral in 1998. She was first introduced to U. G. Krishnamurti, through Mahesh Bhatt in 1979 and subsequently developed a close mentorship and friendship with him.

=== Mental health ===
Mahesh Bhatt revealed that Babi had her first panic attack in 1969, during communal riots. During which she was hidden under a mattress and transported to her guardian's home, fearing she might be sexually assaulted.

While filming Jwalamukhi in 1979, Bhatt, her mother and her secretary Ved Sharma, found Babi sitting in the corner of the bedroom holding a knife. She claimed that the room was bugged and Amitabh Bachchan was trying to kill her. She expressed persistent paranoia over the next few days, refusing to eat or change her clothes, looking for electronic bugs, and claiming that multiple people, including Bhatt, were conspiring against her. Fearing that her meals were poisoned, she insisted that someone else sampled them before she ate. While her mother was convinced that Babi was possessed, Bhatt recognized she needed psychiatric attention and sought help from Denzongpa. She was eventually diagnosed with and treated for schizophrenia. During this time, the media and her Bollywood peers speculated that her illness was a result of "drug addiction and a promiscuous lifestyle." A growing number of filmmakers waiting to direct Babi in their respective projects failed to acknowledge the "gravity of her ailment" and further antagonised Bhatt. When her prescribed medications did not yield the desired result, doctors suggested electroconvulsive therapy as the next step. Bhatt, who disagreed with the treatment, travelled to Bengaluru with Babi and entrusted spiritual guru UG Krishnamurti with her care. She remained in Bengaluru for the next six months and reportedly observed a noticeable improvement in her health. Babi was forced to return to Mumbai in December 1979 after her mother reprimanded her about the pending film projects and pressured her to get back to work.

On 30 July 1983, Babi left India and travelled to the United States with Krishnamurti and his friend Valentine and spent time in Los Angeles, Houston, London and Switzerland. She returned to Bombay in November 1989. She was rumoured to have been diagnosed with paranoid schizophrenia, although she always denied this, stating that it was a conspiracy by the film industry and the media, to malign her image and make her look insane, so they could cover up their crimes. Babi also broke off her relationships with most of her friends and family members and became reclusive in her later years.

On 7 April 1984, Babi was briefly detained and institutionalized after she became "hysterical" during a routine check at the John F. Kennedy International Airport. She was eventually released from the public hospital following an intervention by the Indian Consul and Krishnamurti. In a January 1990 interview with a film magazine, she said: "Amitabh Bachchan is a super international gangster. He is after my life. His goons kidnapped me and I was kept on an island where they performed a surgery on me and planted one transmitter/chip/electronic bug right under my ear." There was a photograph of Babi, showing a scar below her ears.

In 2002, Babi filed multiple affidavits in the Terrorism and Disruptive Activities (Prevention) Act (TADA) court, alleging that a conspiracy to acquit Sanjay Dutt for his involvement in the 1993 Mumbai bombings was being hatched by the Central Bureau of Investigation (CBI). She claimed that various regional and international agencies, governments and institutions, including the MI6, Shiv Sena's Bal Thackeray, Bhartiya Janta Party and the Roman Catholic Church amongst others, were responsible for the bombings. After failing to depose before the court on three different occasions citing personal security concerns, the designated judge upheld public prosecutor Ujjwal Nikam's contention to dismiss Babi's plea as she had produced no credible evidence against Dutt who was the prime accuse in the case. In the same year, she filed a petition in the Supreme Court of India, accusing a number of Bollywood and Hollywood actors, including Amitabh Bachchan, Mel Gibson and Robert Redford, of being intelligence agents conspiring to kill her.

== Death ==
Babi was found dead on 22 January 2005 at the age of 50, after her residential society secretary alerted the police, that she had not collected groceries and newspapers from her doorstep for three days. The police suspected that she may have been dead for up to 48 hours, before her body was found. The cause of death was not immediately known. She was found to have gangrene on her left foot, a complication from diabetes. A wheelchair was found near her bed along with a series of disarranged paintings, clothes, medicines, and old newspapers. It is possible that she was unable to walk in her last days, due to a gangrenous foot and required the use of a wheelchair, to move around in her flat. An autopsy was performed at Cooper Hospital and reports showed that there were no traces of food in her stomach, but some alcohol (possibly from her medication) was found and it was possible that she had not eaten anything, for more than three days and starved to death as a result. The police ruled out foul play and determined she succumbed to organ failure and diabetes.

Although Babi expressed a desire to be buried according to Christian rites, her Muslim relatives who claimed her body after her death, buried her according to Islamic rites. She was buried at Juhu Muslim cemetery in Santacruz, Mumbai.

After her death, the State Administrator General of Maharashtra, became the sole custodian of her properties and assets. Later, chaos erupted when various distant relatives filed petitions with the high court regarding the will of her property, which had been lying in the locker of a Junagadh bank, executed jointly by actor and her friend Murad Khan Babi. The will stated that 70% of her property was to be put in a trust in her name to help poor members of the Babi family. 20% was pledged to Murad Khan Babi, for being "a guiding force", and 10% was to be given to Christian missionary funds. In October 2016, the Bombay High Court approved Babi's will, ending the legal dispute over her property that had continued for 11 years so her assets could be used for social causes.

Five years later in 2010, due to a shortage of land space for burials, Babi's grave along with other luminary Bollywood celebrities, such as Mohammed Rafi, Madhubala, Sahir Ludhianvi, Talat Mahmood, Naushad Ali, who were interred at Santa Cruz Muslim Cemetery, was exhumed and their remains were relocated.

== Artistry and legacy ==
Babi is regarded as one of the most glamorous iconic and greatest actresses of Indian cinema. She never shied away from portraying roles of women having a live-in relationship or consuming alcohol openly, both of which were taboo in those times. The fact that she was paired with Amitabh Bachchan in eight films, during the peak of the Big B mania, attests to her stature and star power. Bachchan and Babi complemented each other in the heady first years of the Angry Young Man phenomenon. One of the highest paid actresses of the 1970s and the 1980s, in 2022, she was placed in Outlook India's "75 Best Bollywood Actresses" list. Babi was among the most stylish and beautiful actress of Hindi cinema. Times of India placed her in its "50 Beautiful Faces" list. She was the first Indian star to be featured on the cover of the Asia edition of TIME in 1976. Rediff.com placed Babi seventh in its "Sexiest Bollywood stars of all times" list. Babi is considered among the hottest Bollywood actresses of all time.

Writing for Firstpost, Subhash K. Jha noted, "With her good looks, perk, poise, and sex appeal, the sky was the limit for Parveen Babi." Filmfare noted, "In the 1970s and 1980s, Parveen Babi had a devoted fan base and lit up the screen whenever she showed on it." India Today wrote, "Parveen Babi with her chiselled looks, well-sculpted body and anglicised accent donned the mantle of archetypal Indian heroine and imparted to the female prima donna of Bollywood her characteristic mannerisms forever." Latha Srinavasan of The Sunday Guardian termed her "alluring yet outspoken" and said she was "a sensation in the 1970s".

== Filmography ==
Year	Title	Role	Notes	Ref.
1973	Charitra	Shikha		
1974	Trimurti	Sunita		
1974	36 Ghante	Naina Rai		
1974	Dhuen Ki Lakeer	Poonam		
1974	Majboor	Neela Rajvansh		
1975	Deewaar	Anita		
1975	Kaala Sona	Durga		
1976	Bhanwar	Roopa D'Souza		
1976	Bullet	Sapna		
1976	Rangila Ratan	Madhu		
1976	Mazdoor Zindabaad	Kamla		
1977	Chandi Sona	Rita		
1977	Amar Akbar Anthony	Jenny		
1977	Chalta Purza	Sheetal		
1977	Darinda	Kirti Thakur		
1977	Mastan Dada	Asha		
1977	Mama Bhanja	Madhu Malini		
1977	Chor Sipahee	Bharti Khanna		
1978	Aahuti	Rekha		
1978	Pati, Patni Aur Woh	Neeta	Cameo	
1979	Kaala Patthar	Anita		
1979	Suhaag	Anu		
1980	Do Aur Do Paanch	Anju Sharma		
1980	Ek Gunah Aur Sahi	Paro		
1980	The Burning Train	Sheetal Verma		
1980	Shaan	Sunita	Also playback singer for "Pyar Karne Waale"	
1980	Gunehgaar	Madhu		
1981	Kranti	Sureeli		
1981	Khoon Aur Paani	Rita		
1981	Meri Aawaz Suno	Rita		
1981	Kaalia	Shalini/Rani Singh		
1981	Ladies Tailor	Parveen	Cameo	
1982	Raksha	Chanda/Bijli		
1982	Desh Premee	Dr. Preeti		
1982	Namak Halaal	Nisha		
1982	Ashanti	Sunita		
1982	Dil... Akhir Dil Hai	Sapna		
1982	Khud-Daar	Mary		
1982	Yeh Nazdeekiyan	Kiran		
1982	Taaqat	Ambika		
1983	Mangal Pandey	Kavita		
1983	Durdesh	Renu	Indo-Canadian film	
1983	Arpan	Sona		
1983	Mahaan	Manju		
1983	Rang Birangi	Nirmala Sharma		
1983	Jaani Dost	Meena		
1983	Chor Police	Seema		
1983	Razia Sultan	Khakun		
1983	Film Hi Film	Herself	Cameo	
1984	Bad Aur Badnam	Pamela Singh		
1984	Kanoon Meri Mutthi Mein	Geeta/Jwala		
1984	Teri Bahon Mein	Dancer	Cameo	
1985	Karm Yudh	Herself	Cameo	
1985	Ameer Aadmi Gharib Aadmi	Dancer	Cameo	
1985	Sitamgar	Sheela		
1985	Telephone	Anita		
1985	Bond 303	Kavita Verma/Suziana	Double Role	
1986	Avinash	Nisha		
1986	Ricky	Herself	Cameo	
1988	Akarshan	Herself	Special appearance	
1991	Iraada	Kiran		

== Honours and tributes ==
Mahesh Bhatt wrote and directed the movie Arth, released in 1982, it is supposedly a semi-autobiographical film about his relationship with Babi. Smita Patil's role Kavita in the film, was inspired by Babi. Bhatt also wrote and produced the movie Woh Lamhe, released in 2006 it was directed by his nephew Mohit Suri, it was based on his recollection and interpretation of his relationship with Babi and without any inputs from her. The role of Sana Azim, was inspired by her and was portrayed by Kangana Ranaut.

Fellow actress Zeenat Aman said, "Parveen was gorgeous, glamorous and talented. Back in the '70s, we wore our hair in a similar manner and enjoyed Western fashion. After her death, I often ruminated on how she was remembered. Parveen was much more than who she dated or what she said when she was unwell. I feel she never truly got the chance to say her piece." Designer Manish Malhotra said, "Parveen Babi brought minimalism into fashion. She was always impeccable, not overdoing it even once." Malhotra also added her in his "Five super stylish heroines of the seventies" list. In 2006, the 37th International Film Festival of India honoured Babi by screening her films. In 2020, Karishma Upadhyay wrote a biography about her named: "Parveen Babi: A Life".
