= Banjaran =

- DVD cover
- बंजारनbanjara
- Directed by: Harmesh Malhotra
- Produced by: Om Prakash Mittal, Ram Singh
- Starring: Rishi Kapoor; Sridevi; Pran; Kulbhushan Kharbanda; Raza Murad; Gulshan Grover
- Music by: Laxmikant–Pyarelal
- Release date: 8 November 1991
- Country: India
- Language: Hindi

Banjaran (बंजारन) (transl. Wanderer) is a 1991 Hindi-language Bollywood romance film. It was directed by Harmesh Malhotra. Rishi Kapoor and Sridevi played the main lead roles. Laxmikant–Pyarelal were the music directors. The film was released on 8 November 1991.

== Plot ==
Reshma (Sridevi) lives with her father Sardar Malik (Sudhir Pandey), who is the leader of a nomadic tribe, the Banjara people. On the night of every new moon, Reshma has the same nightmare in which she is chased by some goons and ends up dead. The tribe lands in the area owned by Rana Udaybhan Singh Sesodia (Kulbhushan Kharbanda).

Kumar Singh Sesodia (Rishi Kapoor), son of Udaybhan Singh, and Reshma feel an unknown attraction towards each other. Despite acknowledging that Reshma's nasty nightmares stopped due to the arrival of Kumar Singh, her father is angry as she was engaged to Shakti Singh (Gulshan Grover). On the other side, Udaybhan Singh is not very keen about his only son pursuing a nomad girl. Reshma and Kumar run away and take refuge in an old haweli. Soon their fathers arrive with goons of each but the fight is stopped by the old caretaker of the haweli Thakur Baba (Pran).

Thakur Baba shows them a painting of his daughter, Devi, who looked just like Reshma. He further tells the story that many years ago his only daughter Devi fell in love with a boy Suraj of a lower social class. But he along with others did not approve of this relationship. He himself killed Suraj and later Devi killed herself. Then both Devi and Suraj were born again as Reshma and Kumar. As luck would have it, they both met and fell in love again. He pleads with both sides to let the lovers unite as they have waited decades, and even death cannot keep them part.

Listening to Thakur Baba, Sardar Malik and Udaybhan Singh end their feud and let Reshma and Kumar live their lives together.

== Cast ==
- Rishi Kapoor as Kumar Singh Sesodia / Suraj
- Sridevi as Reshma / Devi
- Pran as Thakur Baba
- Kulbhushan Kharbanda as Rana Udaybhan Singh Sesodia
- Raza Murad as Thakur Ranjit Singh
- Gulshan Grover as Shakti Singh
- Sudhir Pandey as Sardar Malik, tribal leader
- Anjana Mumtaz as Mrs. Singh Sesodia
- Viju Khote as Bhujangji Maharaj
- Rakesh Bedi as Sarju, driver
- Sharat Saxena as Girja
- Mahavir Shah as Thakur Mahavir Singh
- Ram Mohan as Dongar Singh
- Renu Arya as Neha Singh, Thakur Ranjit Singh's daughter
- Madhu Malhotra as Ambika, Reshma's friend
- Rajan Haksar
- Birbal

== Soundtrack ==
All lyrics by Anand Bakshi. 'Teri Banjaran', sung by Alka Yagnik, remains a popular song.

Song	Singer
"Badli Hai Na Badlegi Hum Banjaron Ki Reet"	Lata Mangeshkar
"Desh Badalte Hain, Bhesh Badalte Hain"	Anuradha Paudwal, Mohammed Aziz, Sukhwinder Singh
"Tere Mere Pyar Ki Kahaniyan Hai"	Kavita Krishnamurthy, Mohammed Aziz
"Yeh Jeevan Kitni Baar Mile"	Alka Yagnik, Mohammed Aziz
"Mere Dil Ki Galiyon Mein Tu Kab Se Abaad Hai"	Alka Yagnik, Suresh Wadkar
"Teri Banjaran Rasta Dekhe"	Alka Yagnik, Lata Mangeshkar (Vocals)
