= Amjad Khan (actor) =

Indian film actor (1940–1992)

- Khan in 1982
- Born: 1940; Lahore, British India
- Died: 27 July 1992 (aged 51–52); Bombay, Maharashtra, India
- Education: St. Andrew's High School; R. D. National College; University of Bombay
- Occupations: Actor; film director
- Years active: 1951–1992
- Known for: Sholay (1975)
- Notable work: Gabbar Singh
- Spouse: Shehla Khan (m. 1972)
- Children: 3 (including Shadaab Khan)
- Father: Jayant
- Relatives: Imtiaz Khan (brother); Akhtar ul Iman (father-in-law); Zafar Karachiwala (son-in-law)

Amjad Khan (1940 – 27 July 1992) was an Indian actor and film director. He worked in over 132 films in a career spanning nearly twenty years. He was the son of the actor Jayant. He gained popularity for villainous roles in mostly Hindi films, the most famous among his enacted roles being Gabbar Singh in the 1975 film Sholay and of Dilawar in Muqaddar Ka Sikandar (1978).

== Early life and education ==
Amjad Khan was born in 1940 (although some sources say 1943) in Lahore British India on 21 October 1943 into a family of Pashtuns to actor Jayant, who was originally from Peshawar, North-West Frontier Province (now Khyber Pakhtunkhwa, Pakistan). His younger brother Imtiaz Khan was also an actor.

Amjad Khan was educated at St. Andrew's High School in Bandra. He then attended R. D. National College where he held the position of general secretary. During his college and school days, he worked as a theater artist and performed in his college with his brother. Later, he earned his master's in philosophy (first class) from Bombay University and used to win prizes both as actor and as director at the inter-collegiate theatre festivals. Apart from English and Urdu, Amjad Khan was also fluent in Persian, having done another master's in Persian literature, and he would help his wife for her exams in this subject.

== Career ==
=== Early career (1951-1975) ===
Khan got breakthrough as a child actor with his first film role at the age of 11 in the film Nazneen in 1951. He also played small roles in Ab Dilli Dur Nahin (1957) and Maya (1961). He assisted K. Asif during the making of the film Love And God and had a brief appearance in the film. The film was left incomplete after Asif's death in 1971, and it was finally released in 1986. In 1973, he appeared in Hindustan Ki Kasam in a small role which marked his debut as an adult.

=== Success with Sholay and subsequent works (1975-1992) ===
In 1975, Khan received his first major breakthrough role as dacoit Gabbar Singh in the film Sholay. He was first offered the role by one of its writers, Salim Khan. In preparation for the role, he read Abhishapth Chambal, a book on Chambal dacoits written by Taroon Kumar Bhaduri (actress Jaya Bhaduri's father). Sholay went on to become an all-time blockbuster and his portrayal of Gabbar Singh received critical acclaim. The character remained his most popular and became a cultural icon in Hindi cinema. Khan later appeared as the character in a television advertisement which promoted biscuits for children.

After the success of Sholay, Khan continued to play negative and supporting character roles in many subsequent Hindi films in the 1970s, 1980s and early 1990s – superseding, in terms of popularity and demand, the earlier Indian actor, Ajit. He often acted as villain opposite Amitabh Bachchan as the hero. His role in Inkaar was also presented in terrifying manner. He made his presence felt in films such as Des Pardes, Muqaddar Ka Sikandar, Nastik, Satte Pe Satta, Chambal Ki Kasam, Ganga Ki Saugandh, Hum Kisise Kum Nahin and Naseeb.

Khan was also acclaimed for playing many unconventional roles. In the critically acclaimed film Shatranj Ke Khiladi (1977) (based on the novel of the same title), by Munshi Premchand and directed by Satyajit Ray, Khan played the helpless and deluded monarch Wajid Ali Shah, whose kingdom, Avadh, is being targeted by British colonialists from the British East India Company. It is the only movie in which he dubbed a song. He also appeared in the Gujarati film Vir Mangdavalo (1976) directed by legendary director Ramanand Sagar alongside notable actor Arvind Trivedi. In 1979, he portrayed Emperor Akbar in the film Meera. He played many positive roles such as in Yaarana (1981) and Laawaris (1981) as Amitabh's friend and father respectively, Rocky (1981) and Commander (1981). In the art film Utsav (1984), he portrayed Vatsayana, the author of the Kama Sutra. In 1988, he appeared in the Merchant Ivory English film The Perfect Murder as an underworld don. He excelled at playing comical characters in films such as Qurbani (1980), Love Story (1981) and Chameli Ki Shaadi (1986). In 1986, he appeared in the Tamil film Vikram with Kamal Hassan.

In 1991, he reprised his role as Gabbar Singh in Ramgarh Ke Sholay, a parody of the legendary film which also included look-alikes of Dev Anand and Amitabh Bachchan.

He continued working until his death in July 1992 and several of his completed films were released posthumously such as Rudaali (1993), Do Fantoosh (1994) and Aatank (1996).

=== Directorial work ===
He ventured into directing in the 1980s, writing, directing and starring in Adhura Aadmi (1982) (however it was never released)Adhura Aadmi (1982) - Hindi Film Album then he directed Chor Police (1983) and Ameer Aadmi Gareeb Aadmi (1985), both of the films did not do well at the box office. His first directorial venture Adhura Aadmi remained incomplete.

=== Other work ===
Amjad was the president of the Actors Guild Association.

== Personal life and death ==
=== Relationships and family ===
In 1972, he married Shaila Khan, the daughter of Urdu poet and screenwriter Akhtar ul Iman, and in the following year, she gave birth to their first child, Shadaab Khan, who would later join the entertainment industry. He also had a daughter, Ahlam Khan, an actress and screenwriter, and another son, Seemab Khan, who is a club cricketer. Ahlam married popular theatre actor Zafar Karachiwala in 2011.

=== Literature and philosophy ===
Amjad Khan was fond of literature and philosophy, having studied the subject, often quoting English poets such as Keats, Byron, Wordsworth, Shelley as well ancient Greek philosophers like Plato and Aristotle.

=== Accident ===
On 15 October 1976, Amjad Khan met with a serious accident on the Mumbai-Goa highway which left him with broken ribs and a punctured lung. He was on his way to the filming of The Great Gambler, starring Amitabh Bachchan.

=== Last years ===
Amjad Khan was passionate about badminton and bull-work but, following another accident, he was diagnosed with Bell's palsy in 1984. This led to a course of steroid treatment which, combined with his poor eating habits, caused excessive weight gain that negatively affected both his health and his career. On 27 July 1992, he died aged 51. His death was attributed to a heart attack.
