= Gaddaar (1973 film) =

1973 Hindi language film

Gaddaar (English: The Traitor) is a 1973 Hindi language heist action film. It stars Vinod Khanna in lead role and the supporting casts include Yogeeta Bali, Pran, Ranjeet, Madan Puri, Iftekhar, Manmohan, Ram Mohan, Anwar Hussain and Satyen Kappu.

== Cast ==
- Vinod Khanna as Raj Kumar "Raja"
- Yogeeta Bali as Reshma
- Pran as B. K.
- Ranjeet as Babu
- Madan Puri as Kanhaiya
- Iftekhar as Professor
- Manmohan as Mohan
- Ram Mohan as John
- Anwar Hussain as Sampat
- Satyen Kappu as Dr. Mathur
- Ajit Khan as His Highness

== Production ==
The music was provided by Laxmikant-Pyarelal. It was a successful film on its release. The film was produced and directed by Harmesh Malhotra.

== Soundtrack ==
The music was composed by Laxmikant-Pyarelal. The opening credit sequence features a theme which is a direct copy of main theme of Sergio Leone's classic For a Few Dollars More, composed by Ennio Morricone.

Song	Singer
"Tu Gaddaar Sahi"	Mohammed Rafi
"Maine Dhunda Tujhe"	Lata Mangeshkar
"Vai Vai, Main Jal Gayi"	Lata Mangeshkar
