= Harmesh Malhotra =

Indian film director, producer, and writer

- Born: 14 June 1936
- Died: 22 November 2005 (aged 69)
- Occupations: Film director Producer; Screenplay writer
- Years active: 1969 – 2005
- Children: Payal Malhotra

Harmesh Malhotra (14 June 1936 – 22 November 2005) was an Indian film director, producer, and screenplay writer.

== Career ==
Malhotra made his directorial debut with Beti (1969), featuring Sanjay Khan and Nanda. In 1972, he established his own production company, HM Productions. He is best known for directing Nagina (1986), starring Rishi Kapoor, Sridevi, and Amrish Puri. He later directed its sequel, Nigahen (1989). Another notable film in his career is Dulhe Raja (1998), which starred Govinda.

== Personal life ==
Malhotra's roots lied in Khushab District, a region now in Punjab, Pakistan and had to move to Agra, Uttar Pradesh following the 1947 partition.

He was married to Manju Malhotra and had two daughters, including Payal Malhotra who has acted in films.

== Filmography ==
Year	Film	Credited as		Notes
Year	Film	Director	Producer	Notes
1969	Beti	Yes		
1973	Gaddaar	Yes	Yes	
1974	Patthar Aur Payal	Yes		
1975	Lafange	Yes	Yes	
1976	Sangram	Yes		
1978	Phaansi	Yes	Yes	
1978	Amar Shakti	Yes		
1979	Bagula Bhagat	Yes		
1980	Choron Ki Baaraat	Yes		
1981	Poonam	Yes		
1981	Raaz	Yes		
1981	Aapas Ki Baat	Yes		
1983	Mangal Pandey	Yes	Yes	
1985	Phaansi Ke Baad	Yes	Yes	
1986	Nagina	Yes	Yes	
1987	Khazana	Yes		
1988	Sherni	Yes		
1988	Dharam Shatru	Yes		
1989	Nigahen	Yes	Yes	Also screenplay writer
1990	Vidrohi	Yes		
1990	Amiri Garibi	Yes		
1991	Banjaran	Yes		
1992	Heer Ranjha	Yes	Yes	
1994	Cheetah	Yes		
1994	Paappi Devataa	Yes		
1995	Kismat	Yes		
1997	Tu Haseen Main Jawaan	Yes		
1998	Dulhe Raja	Yes	Yes	
2002	Akhiyon Se Goli Maare	Yes	Yes	
2005	Khullam Khulla Pyaar Karen	Yes		
2026	Hum Mein Shahenshah Koun	Yes		Posthumous release; Delayed release after 37 years; Filmed in 1989
