= Naqab (film) =

1955 film by Lekhraj Bhakhri

- Theatrical release poster
- Directed by: Lekhraj Bhakhri
- Written by: Pandit Girish
- Screenplay by: Pandit Girish
- Produced by: Lekhraj Bhakhri
- Starring: Madhubala; Shammi Kapoor; Ajit
- Cinematography: Ranjodh Thakur
- Edited by: Lachmandas
- Music by: Govindram
- Release date: 3 June 1955
- Country: India
- Language: Hindustani

Naqab (lit. 'Veil') is a 1955 Indian Hindustani-language fantasy film directed by Lekhraj Bhakhri. It stars Madhubala, Shammi Kapoor, and Ajit, and follows an orphaned princess who is imprisoned by a vizier and rescued with the help of her fiancé and his sister.

== Plot ==
The Wazir of the State was madly in love with Princess Rukhshana who was engaged with Prince Kamran of the neighbouring State. She disliked the Wazir. To fulfill his desire Wazir one night killed her father, the King. Even then Princess refused to fulfill his desire and she was imprisoned in the Palace on the Lake. Prince Kamran knowing this fact, comes to the city in disguise with his sister Yasmin and a few of his soldiers to free the princess. The Wazir knowing the Kamran's arrival orders that nobody should move out of the city after sunset. Yasmin is taken by the police who was moving the streets after sunset to the Police station as a prisoner. Anwar in charge of the Police station falls in love with Yasmin and releases her. She cleverly knows the place where the Princess is kept. She keeps Anwar in the dark about her place and name. She names her as Roohi. Roohi informs Kamran of the place where Princess is kept and he suggests to keep Anwar in hands for their purpose. It so happens that Anwar is deputed as Guard in charge at the Palace and gets a special medal from Wazir. With the help of Anwar, Roohi and Kamran manage to see the Princess, present her flowers and these flowers become the cause for Wazir to know that somebody was with Anwar to see the Princess. Wazir orders Anwar to be handcuffed and bring him to Durbar. Here Roohi cleverly releases him pleasing "Wazir by her Dances". Once again Kamran taking the help of the Medal goes to the palace where Wazir is also present. They come in direct fight and afterwards he runs away. Roohi takes back the medal to Anwar, saying that one man named Kamran had the medal and he is coming back to her place in the night.Wazir informed by Anwar of the fact comes to Roohi's place where Roohi manages to take seal on Wazir Handkerchief by her skill.Kamran taking his Handkerchief runs to the palace to set free Princess and succeeds. But Princess is trapped again. Anwar gets orders to bring Kamran and Roohi live or dead. Roohi is imprisoned. Kamran escapes and make the Princess free. In the open vide Public Arena Wazir orders Anwar to shoot Roohi, his sweetheart.

== Cast ==
- Madhubala as Yasmin
- Shammi Kapoor as Anwar
- Asha Mathur as Rukhsana
- Ajit as Kamran
- Hiralal as the vizier
- Yashodhra Katju as Rani

== Music ==
Song	Singer
"Ae Dil Ki Lagi"	Lata Mangeshkar
"Shokh Adayen Mast Nigahen"	Asha Bhosle
"Hum Tere Sitam Ka Kabhi"	Lata Mangeshkar
"Kab Tak Uthaye Aur Yeh Gham Intazar Ka, Aaja, Chirag Bujh Raha Hai Tere Pyar Ka"	Lata Mangeshkar, Mohammed Rafi
"Hum Unki Mast Aankhon Ke"	Talat Mahmood
"Tera Khayal Dil Ko Sataye"	Talat Mahmood
"Majnu Bana Diya"	S. D. Batish, S. Balbir
"Chun Chunke Layi Hoon"	Shamshad Begum
"Dil Se Dil Ka Paimana"	Shamshad Begum
"Na Lena Mera Naam"	Asha Bhosle
"Azaad Mujhko Kar De"	Asha Bhosle

== Release ==
The film premiered at Super Cinema, Bombay, on 3 June 1955.

== Reception ==
The Times of India described Naqab as a "poor amateurish production".

Writing in the August 1955 issue of Filmindia, critic Baburao Patel panned the film as "a big, ugly bundle of silly stunts and crass stupidities". He dismissed Bhakri's direction, the poor production values and dialogue, and the lead performances.
