= Ek Gunah Aur Sahi =

- Directed by: Yogi Kathuria
- Starring: Sunil Dutt; Parveen Babi; Madan Puri
- Music by: Jaidev
- Release date: 17 March 1980
- Running time: 150 minutes
- Country: India
- Language: Hindi

Ek Gunah Aur Sahi is an Indian Hindi film which was released in 1980. It starred Sunil Dutt, Parveen Babi and Madan Puri. The film was produced and directed by Yogi Kathuia.

== Cast ==
- Sunil Dutt as Shankar
- Parveen Babi as Paro
- Madan Puri as Mr. Verma

== Music ==
Lyrics: Jan Nisar Akhtar

Song	Singer
"Raat Aati Hai"	Manna Dey
"Balma Re, Ab Tose"	Sulakshana Pandit
"Yahi Hai Tamanna"	Asha Bhosle
