= Andaz Apna Apna =

1994 Indian film by Rajkumar Santoshi

- Theatrical release poster
- Directed by: Rajkumar Santoshi
- Written by: Rajkumar Santoshi; Dilip Shukla
- Produced by: Vinay Kumar Sinha
- Starring: Aamir Khan; Salman Khan; Raveena Tandon; Karisma Kapoor; Paresh Rawal; Shakti Kapoor; Tiku Talsania
- Cinematography: Ishwar R. Bidri
- Edited by: V. N. Mayekar
- Music by: Tushar Bhatia (songs); Viju Shah (score)
- Distributed by: Vinay Pictures; Ultra Distributors
- Release date: 4 November 1994
- Running time: 160 minutes
- Country: India
- Language: Hindi
- Budget: ₹29 million
- Box office: ₹8.65 million

Andaz Apna Apna (transl. Everyone Has Their Own Style) is a 1994 Indian Hindi-language action comedy film written and directed by Rajkumar Santoshi and produced by Vinay Kumar Sinha. It stars Aamir Khan, Salman Khan, Raveena Tandon, Karisma Kapoor, Paresh Rawal (in a dual role), Shakti Kapoor, and Tiku Talsania. The film focuses on two gold diggers who attempt to woo an heiress to have access to her father's wealth. They soon realize that the heiress has exchanged her identity with that of her secretary. By that point, one of them is genuinely in love with the heiress, and the other gold digger has fallen for the secretary.

The film was released on 4 November 1994 and the plot elements of the film were later used in other language films such as Ullathai Allitha (1996), Veedevadandi Babu (1997) and Galate Aliyandru (2000). The climax of this film is a rehashed version of the climax of a 1972 film Victoria No. 203. Although the film was unsuccessful at the box office, the film has since emerged as a cult film.

== Plot ==
Both Amar Manohar and Prem Bhopali are daydreamers living with their fathers Murli and Bankelal respectively. They learn that millionaire Ram Gopal Bajaj's daughter Raveena Bajaj is coming to India from London with her secretary Karishma to find a suitable groom. Amar and Prem decide to woo Raveena to get a share in her father's wealth.

Amar and Prem meet each other when they escape from their towns and board a bus bound for Ooty where Raveena and Karishma live. They soon realise that they have the same goal and they also fail at several attempts to woo Raveena and Karishma but they manage to enter their house.

Amar pretends that he has lost his memory and eyesight after getting knocked out by Raveena when he tried to flirt with her, while Prem pretends to be a doctor at their house to cure him of his diseases but he unknowingly falls in love with Karishma.

Meanwhile, nobody knows that Ram Gopal has an evil twin-brother Shyam Gopal "Teja" Bajaj who plans to kidnap him and pose as him to go to London. He has also sent his two sidekicks Robert and Bhalla to live in Raveena and Karishma's house as their servants. Later, Amar and Prem discover that the secretary Karishma is actually the wealthy "Raveena" while the wealthy Raveena is actually the secretary "Karishma", as they had exchanged their identities as Raveena wanted to find a suitable groom for herself who will love her, not her money. However, Amar still falls in love with the real Karishma while Prem also still falls in love with the real Raveena.

Soon, Ram Gopal arrives in India and seeing the true nature of Amar and Prem, declines their marriages with Raveena and Karishma, respectively. They plan a fake kidnapping of him along with their friends where they will heroically "rescue" him which will make him agree to their marriages. Teja also plans along with Robert and Bhalla to kidnap Ram Gopal and steal all of his money converted into his diamonds. Robert and Bhalla somehow manage to kidnap Ram Gopal which shocks Amar and Prem. When they go to Teja's hideout to rescue Ram Gopal, they mistake Teja for him and take him to his house.

The next day, Raveena and Karishma tell their suspicion to Amar and Prem who discover the truth by secretly following Teja to his hideout where Ram Gopal tricks him and escapes his hideout prison. However, Amar and Prem mistake him for Teja and imprison him again - resulting in Teja imprisoning Amar and Prem as well before escaping from his hideout. Amar and Prem still manage to convince Robert and Bhalla that Ram Gopal is Teja and free him from prison. An escaping Teja is then stopped by Amar and Prem along with Robert and Bhalla.

Meanwhile, throughout the film, Robert and Bhalla are constantly harassed by Crime Master Gogo who is demanding his money taken by Teja back, but he discovers Ram Gopal's diamonds and he kidnaps him along with Raveena and Karishma. At Gogo's hideout, Amar and Prem arrive and they try to control the situation along with Ram Gopal as each motive of each villain is revealed in a comic standoff. However, the police who were already called by Amar and Prem, are able to find Gogo's hideout and arrest all of the criminals. Ram Gopal finally gets all of his diamonds back and he also agrees to the marriages of Amar and Prem with Real Karishma and Raveena (fake Raveena and fake Karishma), respectively.

== Cast ==
- Aamir Khan as Amar Manohar / Teelu
- Salman Khan as Prem Bhopali / Dr. Prem Khurana
- Raveena Tandon as Karishma (Fake Raveena)
- Karishma Kapoor as Raveena Bajaj (Fake Karishma)
- Paresh Rawal as Ram Gopal Bajaj / Shyam Gopal Bajaj aka Teja (dual role)
- Shakti Kapoor as Crime Master Gogo
- Shehzad Khan as Vinod Bhalla
- Viju Khote as Robert
- Deven Verma as Murli Manohar, Amar’s father
- Mehmood as Johnny
- Jagdeep as Bankelal Bhopali, Prem’s father
- Javed Khan Amrohi as Anand Akela
- Tiku Talsania as Inspector Pandey
- Harish Patel as Sevaram
- Govinda as himself
- Juhi Chawla as herself

== Production ==
=== Development ===
After the success of his debut film Ghayal (1990), director Rajkumar Santoshi was approached by producer Vinay Kumar Sinha for a film. The latter wanted to make a film with Aamir Khan. Having made a film on a serious subject, Santoshi wanted to make a comedy film now. It was then decided that he would write a story about two warring buddies, the human versions of Tom and Jerry. Santoshi wrote the screenplay with Dilip Shukla, also modelling the characters on Archie comics. Despite the film feeling impromptu, every scene and dialogue was in the script. The film was in production for over three years.

=== Casting ===
Santoshi then decided to cast Salman Khan followed by then relative newcomers Karisma Kapoor and Raveena Tandon as the female leads along with Paresh Rawal in a double role. Santoshi finished the script after the casting. He also wrote several dialogues on the set which were in his mind and not in the script. Amrish Puri was supposed to play the role of Mogambo's younger brother, Zorambo. But due to the length of the film, the character was removed. Sunny Deol was supposed to do a cameo in the film, who was not available at that time. It was done by Govinda.

Initially, Salman Khan wanted more screen space than the other but later agreed to have the same amount of screen time. Tinnu Anand was offered the role of the villain "Gogo", but could not do it because of date issues. It was eventually played by Shakti Kapoor. While shooting, Santoshi had to call for a cut as almost the entire crew including the director of photography laughed so hard that it shook the camera. The Muhurat shot was done by cricketer Sachin Tendulkar. Andaz Apna Apna took three years in making, which resulted in some continuity issues. Ishwar Bidri was the director of photography while V. N. Mayekar served as the editor.

=== Marketing ===
Aamir Khan made a special appearance in the 1993 film Damini to promote the film.

== Soundtrack ==
Andaz Apna Apna

Soundtrack album by Tushar Bhatia
- Released: 11 April 1994
- Genre: Feature film soundtrack
- Length: 33:44
- Label: Tips Music
External audio
- Audio Jukebox on YouTube

The film featured 7 songs composed by Tushar Bhatia with lyrics by Majrooh Sultanpuri.

Vocals for Salman Khan were performed by his then-frequent collaborator SP Balasubrahmanyam.

#	Song	Singer
1.	"Ello Ji Sanam Hum Aa Gaye"	Behroze Chatterjee & Vicky Mehta
2.	"Shola Shola Tu Bhadke"	S.P Balasubramaniam, Sapna Mukherjee, Behroze Chatterjee & Debashish Dasgupta
3.	"Dil Karta Hai Tere Pass"	Mangal Singh
4.	"Yeh Raat Aur Yeh Doorie"	Asha Bhosle & S. P Balasubramaniam
5.	"Do Mastane Chale Zindagi Banane"	S.P Balasubramaniam & Debashish Dasgupta
6.	"Jaana Tune Jaana Nahin Haila"	Abhijeet, Debashish Dasgupta & Sadhana Sargam
7.	"Bandu Bol Mera Kya Banega"	Tushar Bhatia

== Reception ==
=== Box office ===
The film was commercially unsuccessful at the box-office. Its total domestic gross was ₹8.18 crore, and its overseas gross was $150,000, bringing its worldwide gross to ₹8.653 crore (equivalent to ₹57 crore or US$5.9 million in 2023).

The lack of publicity and tough competition from other films of that year were reasons for its business. Santoshi also attributes the failure to the fact that the film was not released and distributed well due to a new distributor. All of these films were very strong in their box office presence and Andaz Apna Apna, belonging to a different genre, could not compete well. It has however, in subsequent years, achieved a cult classic status among Hindi audiences.

=== Critical reception ===
While reviewing Grand Masti in 2013, critic Khalid Mohamed described Andaz Apna Apna in the "collection of excellent comedies" from Hindi cinema. Film critic Raja Sen called it a "cornball classic" and "one of the greatest comedies in recent times." In 2014, comedian Aditi Mittal wrote: "Writing about Andaz Apna Apna, I have realized, is like writing about mother's love. Everyone has their own version of how it affects them, what lines they remember the most." The film was featured in Filmfare's 100 Days series. This movie is available on YouTube.

== Legacy ==
Several dialogues from this film like "Teja main hu. Mark Idhar hai", "Crime Master Gogo, Mogambo ka Bhatija", "Do dost ek cup me chai piyenge" etc., are popular. It went on to be an inspiration for the plot element of the Tamil film Ullathai Allitha, the Telugu film Veedevadandi Babu and the Kannada film Galate Aliyandru. Andaz Apna Apna did not have a bound script most of the dialogues were improvised by the cast and crew during the shoot of the film. The film was featured in Filmfare's 100 Days series. It was voted as the 2nd best Bollywood comedy film of all time in an online poll conducted by The Indian Express.

The plot elements of the film were used in many languages as Ullathai Allitha (1996), Veedevadandi Babu (1997), and Galate Aliyandru (2000). Andaz Naya Naya is a Bollywood animated 3D film, an official remake of Andaz Apna Apna, but it has been shelved for unknown reasons. Producer Sidharth Jain began to question if the film would do any good at the box office because Indian animated films do not get the good market, so Jain shelved the film after being 35% done.

Robert, the character from the film played by Viju Khote, also makes an appearance in Ajab Prem Ki Ghazab Kahani, a 2009 film also directed by Rajkumar Santoshi.

The film was re-released with a new 4K restoration by Vinay Pictures and Prasad Film Labs on 25 April 2025, 31 years after its original release.

== Nominations ==
Award	Category	Nominee(s)	Result
40th Filmfare Awards	Best Film	Vinay Kumar Sinha	Nominated
40th Filmfare Awards	Best Director	Rajkumar Santoshi	Nominated
40th Filmfare Awards	Best Actor	Aamir Khan	Nominated
40th Filmfare Awards	Best Comedian	Shakti Kapoor	Nominated
