= St. Andrew's High School, Mumbai =

St. Andrew's High School

Location
- West, 55, St Domnic Rd, Bandra; Mumbai, Maharashtra; India
- Coordinates: 19.056807°N 72.827742°E

Information
- Type: Govt. Aided Primary & Secondary School
- Motto: "UBI CRUX IBI LUX" (Where there is a cross, there is light)
- Established: 1780; 246 years ago
- Founder: Fr. Francisco de Mello
- Status: Open
- Authority: Archdiocese of Bombay
- School code: S.A.S
- Principal: Fr. Magi Murzello
- Grades: SSC Board 1-10
- Campus type: Urban
- Houses: Red, Yellow, Blue, Green
- Rival: St. Stanislaus High School
- Newspaper: Andro Media
- Affiliation: Archdiocese of Bombay
- Website: https://standrewchurch.in/our-parish/st-andrews-high-school/

St. Andrew's High School is a high school located in the western suburbs of Bandra, in Mumbai, India. The school is in the process of receiving its heritage status from BMC heritage committee.

== Notable alumni ==
Alumni are known as Andreans. Notable alumni include:-

- Amjad Khan, (12 November 1940 – 27 July 1992) was an Indian actor and director who appeared in over 130 films.
- Imtiaz Khan (1942–2020) was an Indian actor of Hindi cinema.
- Rakesh Maria, (born 19 January 1957) former Director-General of the Home Guard and former Commissioner of Police, Mumbai.
- Yasin Merchant, (born 17 December 1966) is India's first professional snooker player. He won the Indian National Snooker championships three times.
- Denzil Smith, Indian Actor.

== See also ==
- St. Andrew's College of Arts, Science and Commerce
- St. Andrew's Church, Mumbai
