= Choron Ki Baaraat =

- Directed by: Harmesh Malhotra
- Produced by: Salim A. Calcuttawala; A. K. Nadiadwala
- Starring: Shatrughan Sinha; Neetu Singh
- Music by: Laxmikant–Pyarelal
- Release date: 23 May 1980
- Country: India
- Language: Hindi

Choron Ki Baaraat is a 1980 Indian Hindi-language film directed by Harmesh Malhotra. It stars Shatrughan Sinha and Neetu Singh in pivotal roles. The music was composed by Laxmikant-Pyarelal.

== Synopsis ==
Anju, the daughter of affluent businessman Dhanraj, lives with her father on an isolated private island. She develops a close relationship with Shekhar after the two meet and fall in love. Hoping to see them married, Dhanraj invites Shekhar to join him on the island and offers Shekhar to work for him.

Soon, the arrival of six men with a long-standing grudge against Dhanraj disrupts the peaceful setting. Tensions rise as Anju gradually learns that Shekhar may not have entered her life solely out of love.

== Cast ==
- Shatrughan Sinha as Shekhar
- Neetu Singh as Anju
- Ajit as Dhanraj
- Jeevan as Bheesham
- Ranjeet as Captain Ashok
- Danny Denzongpa as Heera
- Jagdeep as Shekhar's Friend
- Prema Narayan as Sona
- Heena Kausar as Nisha
- Ram Mohan as Manu
- Sudhir as Peter
- Roopesh Kumar as Jaggu
- Jagdish Raj as Police Inspector

== Soundtrack ==
| Song | Singer |
|---|---|
| "Teri Meri Dosti Ho Gayi" | Kishore Kumar, Lata Mangeshkar |
| "Aakhri Waqt Koi" | Lata Mangeshkar |
| "Gulshan Gulshan, Basti Basti" | Manna Dey, Anwar, Shailendra Singh |
| "Choron Ki Baaraat" | Manna Dey, Anwar, Jaspal Singh |

== Trivia ==
Harmesh Malhotra produced & directed Gaddaar the story was written also by Ravi Kapoor, which has same plot and many of the actors from same star cast. In Gaddar, it is Ajit whose money is stolen by gang of thieves while in this movie it is Ajit who is main thief.
