= Heer Ranjha (1992 film) =

- Directed by: Harmesh Malhotra
- Written by: Mangal Dhillon
- Based on: Heer by Waris Shah
- Produced by: Harmesh Malhotra
- Starring: Anil Kapoor; Sridevi; Shammi Kapoor; Anupam Kher
- Cinematography: W. B. Rao
- Music by: Laxmikant Pyarelal
- Release date: 4 September 1992
- Country: India
- Language: Hindi

Heer Ranjha is a 1992 Indian Hindi-language film directed and produced by Harmesh Malhotra. The film stars Anil Kapoor, Sridevi, Shammi Kapoor, Anupam Kher. The film is based on the legend of Heer Ranjha's tragic romance, as narrated in the epic poem Heer by Punjabi poet Waris Shah, written in 1766.

It was flopped due to very weak screenplay and poor art direction. A box office disaster.

== Cast ==
- Anil Kapoor as Dido Chaudhary / Ranjha
- Sridevi as Heer Chaudhary
- Shammi Kapoor as Chochak Chaudhary
- Anupam Kher as Kaido Chaudhary
- Pankaj Dheer as Sultan Chaudhary
- Tinu Anand as Fakeer Baba
- Sushma Seth as Mrs. Chaudhary
- Gufi Paintal as Kazi
- Mangal Dhillon as Zaida
- Priti Sapru as Sethe
- Rakesh Bedi as Ludan
- Satyen Kappu as Sage
- Goga Kapoor as Mauju Chaudhary

== Soundtrack ==
The music was composed by Laxmikant-Pyarelal and lyrics for all songs were written by Anand Bakshi.

Song	Singer
"Aag Hawa Mitti Aur Paani"	Anwar
"Rab Ne Banaya" (Happy)	Lata Mangeshkar; Anwar
"Rab Ne Banaya" (Sad)	Lata Mangeshkar; Anwar
"Aashiq Mera Naam, Hai Tera Ishq Mera Imaan"	Mohammed Aziz; Mangal Singh
"Duniya Ne Mera Sab Kuch Chheena, Nahin Jeena"	Mohammed Aziz; Mangal Singh
"Yeh Ped Hai Peepal Ka, Ho Yeh Ped Hai Peepal Ka"	Mohammed Aziz; Kavita Krishnamurthy
"Ranjha Ranjha Karte Karte"	Kavita Krishnamurthy
"Akhiyon Ne Akhiyon Se"	Reshma
"Jo Phool Yahan Par"	Reshma
