= Mama Bhanja =

- Promotional Poster
- Directed by: Naresh Kumar
- Starring: Randhir Kapoor; Shammi Kapoor; Parveen Babi
- Music by: Rajesh Roshan
- Release date: 13 May 1977
- Country: India
- Language: Hindi

Mama Bhanja is a 1977 Bollywood film directed by Naresh Kumar.

== Plot ==
A dying mother leaves her son in the care of her only brother who brings up his nephew with lots of love and care. The nephew grows up with a lot of values and honesty.

One day the Uncle strikes it rich but then he is hounded by a greedy and horrible woman who seduces him for only his money. This is seen by the nephew who knows the woman is just a greedy woman but the Uncle does not or refuses to understand.

Now starts the job of the nephew to get this woman out of his uncles's life and show his uncle what kind of woman she really is.

== Cast ==
- Shammi Kapoor as Shankar Lal
- Randhir Kapoor as Mohan Lal
- Parveen Babi as Madhu Malini
- Lalita Pawar as Mousi
- Asha Sachdev as Roopa Mathur
- Nadira Kitty Mathur
- Jagdish Raj as Police Inspector
- Ghansham Rohera as Ramesh
- Raj Kishore as Jolly Mathur

== Soundtrack ==
The music is composed by Rajesh Roshan, and the songs are written by Rajinder Krishan.

Song	Singer
"Suno Rani Tumne Der Laga Di"	Kishore Kumar, Lata Mangeshkar
"Ek Baat Meri Hothon Tak Aake Palat Jaati Hai"	Lata Mangeshkar
"Baat Yeh Kaisi Keh Di Zaalim"	Asha Bhosle, Mohammed Rafi
"Meri Jhilmil Jhilmil Bindiya"	Asha Bhosle, Usha Mangeshkar
