= Patthar Aur Payal =

1974 film

- Poster
- Directed by: Harmesh Malhotra
- Produced by: K. P. Singh
- Starring: Dharmendra; Hema Malini; Vinod Khanna; Ajit
- Cinematography: V. Durga Prasad
- Edited by: Bhaskar Rao
- Music by: Kalyanji-Anandji
- Production company: KPS Films
- Release date: 13 August 1974
- Running time: 150 minutes
- Country: India
- Language: Hindi

Patthar Aur Payal is a 1974 Bollywood action film directed by Harmesh Malhotra and produced by K.P. Singh. The film stars Dharmendra, Hema Malini, Vinod Khanna, Ajit, Rajendranath, Iftekhar and Jayshree T.

== Cast ==
- Dharmendra as Ranjeet Singh "Chhote Thakur"
- Hema Malini as Asha Sinha
- Vinod Khanna as Surajbhan Singh "Sarju"
- Ajit as Ajit Singh "Bade Thakur"
- Rajendranath as Shankar Dayal
- Jayshree T. as Rita
- Iftekhar as DIG B. K. Verma
- D. K. Sapru as Rai Bahadur Shiv Narayan Sinha
- M. B. Shetty as Heera

== Plot ==
A story about two brothers' parent that was hanged due to a Thakur having given a false statement in court. They become dacoit (bandits) for revenge.

== Soundtrack ==
Song	Singer
"Aiso Paapi Sawan Aayo"	Lata Mangeshkar
"Tohe Lene Aayi Main"	Lata Mangeshkar
"Na Mila Tu Nazar"	Asha Bhosle
"Kaun Hoon Main"	Asha Bhosle
