= Amar Shakti =

1978 film

- Poster
- Directed by: Harmesh Malhotra
- Produced by: A.K. Nadiadwala
- Starring: Shashi Kapoor; Shatrughan Sinha; Sulakshana Pandit; Manjula
- Music by: Laxmikant–Pyarelal
- Release date: 1978
- Country: India
- Language: Hindi

Amar Shakti is a 1978 Hindi film produced and directed by Harmesh Malhotra. It stars Shashi Kapoor, Shatrughan Sinha, Sulakshana Pandit and Manjula in lead roles.

== Cast ==
- Shashi Kapoor as Chhota Kumar / Amar Singh
- Shatrughan Sinha as Bada Kumar / Shakti Singh
- Sulakshana Pandit as Rajkumari Sunita Singh
- Manjula Vijayakumar as Chamki
- Pradeep Kumar as Maharaj Shamsher Singh
- Ranjan as Amar's fencing guru
- Jeevan as Diwan Nahar Singh
- Ranjeet as Hameera, Sardar's Son
- Om Shivpuri as Sardar Ajit Singh
- Birbal as Gopal
- Indrani Mukherjee as Leela
- Roopesh Kumar as Yuvraj Kumar Ranjit Narayan Singh
- Rajan Haksar as Yuvraj Gopal Singh
- Alka as Yuvrani Roopa G. Singh
- Jankidas as Hakim
- Ram Mohan as Shakti's Friend
- Murad as Maharaj
- Mohan Sherry as Kotwal Sher Singh

== Soundtrack ==
Lyrics: Anand Bakshi

#	Song	Singer
1	"Sahibon Hum Aapko"	Kishore Kumar, Asha Bhosle
2	"Amar Hai Shakti, Shakti Amar Hai"	Kishore Kumar, Anuradha Paudwal, Chandrani Mukherjee, Mohammed Rafi
3	"Mohabbat Mein Nigahon Se"	Mohammed Rafi, Sulakshana Pandit
4	"Thehro Thehro"	Asha Bhosle
