= Bagula Bhagat =

- Directed by: Harmesh Malhotra
- Starring: Ashok Kumar; Shatrughan Sinha; Shabana Azmi
- Music by: Kalyanji-Anandji
- Release date: 1979
- Country: India
- Language: Hindi

Bagula Bhagat is a 1979 Bollywood action film thriller directed by Harmesh Malhotra. The film stars Ashok Kumar, Kamini Kaushal, Shatrughan Sinha and Shabana Azmi in lead roles.

== Cast ==
- Ashok Kumar
- Shatrughan Sinha
- Shabana Azmi
- Kamini Kaushal
- Mehmood Jr.
- Padma Khanna

== Songs ==
All lyrics are written by Anjaan.

1. "Barso Beete" - Kishore Kumar, Amit Kumar
2. "Mehfil Me Meri Aaye Hai" - Kishore Kumar, Asha Bhosle
3. "Bum Bole Ke Bagto Ko" - Kishore Kumar, Mahendra Kapoor
4. "Chali Aayi Tere Pichhe" - Asha Bhosle
