= Irada (1991 film) =

Iraada
- Poster
- Directed by: Inderjeet Singh
- Starring: Shatrughan Sinha; Parveen Babi; Moon Moon Sen
- Music by: Kalyanji-Anandji
- Release date: 8 March 1991
- Country: India
- Language: Hindi

Iraada (transl. Intention) is a 1991 Indian Hindi language Bollywood film starring Shatrughan Sinha, Parveen Babi, Moon Moon Sen in lead roles and music by Kalyanji-Anandji. The movie was directed by Inderjeet Singh. This was the last film of Parveen Babi, before she retired from the film industry.

== Plot ==
Kiran (Parveen Babi) runs a construction business. Her uncle, Dina Nath (Amrish Puri) wants to usurp her business. He starts to tarnish her image. Ashok (Shatrughan Sinha) works with Kiran. He stands by her and fights off attempts made by Dina Nath. Vinod (Suresh Oberoi) enters the lives of Kiran and Ashok. He falls in love with Kiran and resents the closeness between Kiran and Ashok. Due to this, Vinod joins hands with Dina Nath. What happens further forms the story line of Iraada.

== Cast ==
- Shatrughan Sinha as Ashok Sinha
- Parveen Babi as Kiran
- Moon Moon Sen as Journalist Geeta Sen
- Suresh Oberoi as Vinod
- Om Puri as Shankar
- Amrish Puri as Dinanath
- Ranjeet as Tako Dada
- Jeevan as Mr. Gupta
- Nazir Hussain as Mr. Sharma
- Iftekhar as Mr. Ali
- Sudhir Dalvi as Mr. Gomes
- Girija Shankar as Mr. Khanna
- Paidi Jairaj as Sevakram
- Jankidas as Janki
- Brahmachari as Ramu
- Prema Narayan as Dancer

== Soundtrack ==
All songs are music by Kalyanji-Anandji. This is one of the last released Hindi films where Kishore Kumar has lent his voice.

Song	Singer
"Pehle Pet Pooja"	Kishore Kumar
"Rang Pyar Ka Chadha Re Chadha"	Kishore Kumar, Alka Yagnik
"Sapnon Ka Ho Saathi"	Alka Yagnik
"Aapne Husn Dekhe Hai"	Alka Yagnik
