= Heera-Moti =

- Directed by: Chand
- Written by: Khalid Narvi
- Produced by: Ratan Mohan
- Starring: Shatrughan Sinha; Reena Roy
- Cinematography: Pramod Mittle
- Edited by: Bhaskar Rao
- Music by: O. P. Nayyar
- Production company: RM Art Productions
- Release date: 1 July 1979
- Country: India
- Language: Hindi

Heera Moti is a 1979 Bollywood film directed by Chand and produced by Ratan Mohan. It stars Shatrughan Sinha and Reena Roy.

== Cast ==
- Shatrughan Sinha as Vijay / Heera
- Reena Roy as Neelam
- Danny Denzongpa as Ajay / Moti
- Bindu as Julie
- Ajit as Pratap Singh
- Om Shivpuri as Trustee
- Anwar Hussain as Johnny
- Dev Kumar as Sheikh Bin Sheikh
- Narendra Nath as Dracula

== Soundtrack ==
Heera Moti had music by O. P. Nayyar and lyrics by Ahmed Wasi.

#	Song	Singer
1	"Jai Krishna Hare, Jai Shyam Hare"	Mohammed Rafi, Manna Dey
2	"Zindagi Lekar Hatheli Par Deewane Aa Gaye"	Mohammed Rafi, Manna Dey, Dilraj Kaur
3	"Honth Hain Tere Do Lal Heere"	Mohammed Rafi, Dilraj Kaur
4	"Main Tujh Ko Maut De Doon"	Dilraj Kaur
5	"Sau Saal Jiyo Tum Jaan Meri"	Dilraj Kaur
6	"Tum Khud Ko Dekhte Ho Sada"	Dilraj Kaur
