= Sherni (1988 film) =

- Poster
- Directed by: Harmesh Malhotra
- Written by: Kader Khan (dialogues)
- Screenplay by: Ravi Kapoor
- Story by: B. K. Rao
- Produced by: Pawan Kumar
- Starring: Sridevi; Shatrughan Sinha; Pran; Ranjeet; Kader Khan
- Cinematography: Srinivas Mahapatra
- Edited by: Govind Dalwadi
- Music by: Kalyanji-Anandji
- Production company: Ramayan Chitra
- Release date: 13 May 1988
- Country: India
- Language: Hindi

Sherni (transl. Lionness) is a 1988 Indian Hindi-language action drama film directed by Harmesh Malhotra. The film stars Sridevi in the lead role, while Shatrughan Sinha, Pran, Ranjeet, Kader Khan, and Tej Sapru appear in supporting roles. The music was composed by Kalyanji-Anandji.

The film marked the second collaboration between Sridevi and Harmesh Malhotra following the 1986 Nagina.

== Cast ==
- Sridevi as Durga
- Shatrughan Sinha as A.S.P Rajan aka Raju
- Pran as Banjara, Durga's Father
- Ranjeet as Vinodpal Singh
- Kader Khan as Thakur Dharampal Singh
- Ram Mohan as Durga's Gang-member
- Sudhir as Inspector S. K. Sinha
- Tej Sapru as Teja
- Jagdeep as Hajamat Lal
- Yunus Parvez as Munshi
- Birbal as Constable Baburam
- Lalita Pawar as Old lady searching for her son
- Ram Mohan as Hariya
- Iftekhar as Police Chief
- Jankidas as Kedarnath, Hariya's brother-in-law

== Soundtrack ==
Song	Singer
"Mushkil Hai Mushkil"	Asha Bhosle
"Koi Mard Mila Na Aisa, Banka Jawan Tere Jaisa"	Asha Bhosle, Mohammed Aziz
"Ek Rupaiya Doge"	Anuradha Paudwal
"Gadi Gadi Chunar Sarkane Lage"	Alka Yagnik, Sadhana Sargam
"Tere Aane Se"	Sadhana Sargam
