= Vishwanath (1978 film) =

1978 film by Subhash Ghai

- Hindi-language Film poster
- Directed by: Subhash Ghai
- Written by: Subhash Ghai
- Starring: Shatrughan Sinha; Reena Roy
- Music by: Rajesh Roshan
- Production company: Ramayana Chitra
- Release date: 20 January 1978 (India)
- Running time: 142 minutes
- Country: India
- Language: Hindi

Vishwanath is a 1978 Indian Hindi-language action film directed by Subhash Ghai. It stars Shatrughan Sinha and Reena Roy in pivotal roles. The film was remade in Telugu as Lawyer Viswanath (1978) and in Tamil as Naan Mahaan Alla (1984).

== Plot ==
An honest lawyer, Vishwanath is implicated and imprisoned at the behest of powerful underworld don, GNK and his associates. After his release from prison, Vishwanath decides to seek vengeance, but finds out that it is virtually impossible to do this through due process of law. So he decides to change his identity, hire a gang of crooks and assassins, to carry out his vendetta. Not realizing that in doing this he is alienating himself from the love of his life, Soni; and making himself a wanted man by the police, leaving his crippled sister, Munni and mom, Shanti to fend for themselves, and at the mercy of GNK and his associates.

== Cast ==
- Shatrughan Sinha as Vishwanath
- Reena Roy as Soni
- Bharat Bhushan as Fernandes, Soni's father
- Rita Bhaduri as Munni
- Sulochana Latkar as Shanti, Munni's mother
- Parikshit Sahni as Siddharth
- Prem Nath as GNK
- Sudhir as Jimmy
- Pran as Golu Gawah
- Madan Puri as Pukhraj
- Satyendra Kapoor as D.P. Lal
- Iftikhar as Commissioner SK Mahanta
- D. K. Sapru as Judge Patil
- Mukri as sweets shop owner Shambhu Prasad
- Birbal] as Moti
- Manik Irani as Taleb
- Jagdish Raj as Francis
- Ranjeet as Khukha
- Madhu Malhotra as Zarina
- Lalita Pawar as Sarojini, Zarina's mother
- Viju Khote as Adv Damodar Sharma
- Randhir as Jholjhal
- Keshav Rana as Piyush Nath, GNK's associate in court
- Rakesh Pandey as Dr Anil Mittal, Eye specialist
- Hari Shivdasani as Raj Kishan Mehta
- Raj Rani as Mrs Raj Rani Mehta
- Rajan Haskar as Keshto dada
- Ratan Gaurang as John
- Kedarnath Saighal as Arab businessman Sonawala
- Yusuf Khan as Rivoli

== Soundtrack ==
The songs were composed by Rajesh Roshan and penned by Anjaan.

| Title | Singer(s) |
|---|---|
| "Jab Jab Jo Jo Hona Hai" (Male), Lyrics by Vitthalbhai Patel | Kishore Kumar |
| "Duniya Ne Mujhe" | Kishore Kumar; Lata Mangeshkar |
| "Hawa Se Halki", Lyrics by M.G Hashamt | Lata Mangeshkar |
| "Bibadha-Aaj Karegi Man Mani" | Asha Bhosle |
| "Jab Jab Jo Jo Hona Hai" (Female), Lyrics by Vitthalbhai Patel | Lata Mangeshkar |
| "Hai Jindri", Lyrics by Rajkavi Inderjeet Singh Tulsi | Manna Dey |
