= Madhu Malhotra =

Indian actress (1953/1954–2026)

- Born: 30 November 1953
- Died: 15 March 2026 (aged 72)

Madhu Malhotra (1953 or 1954 – 13 March 2026) was an Indian actress. Her appearance for the song Lambi Judai as a gypsy woman from Subhash Ghai's film Hero is well remembered.

Malhotra acted in popular films like Amitabh Bachchan's Satte Pe Satta (1982).

Malhotra died on 13 March 2026, at the age of 72. Her funeral was held at Oshiwara Crematorium in Mumbai, on 14 March.

== Selected filmography ==
Year	Film	Role	Notes
1978	Vishwanath	Zarina	
1982	Satte Pe Satta	Madhu	
1983	Chor Police	Kitty	
1983	Hero	Gypsy woman	Special appearance
1984	Kanoon Kya Karega	Champa Bai	
1985	Phaansi Ke Baad	Neena	
1985	Cheekh	Rita	
1990	Amavas Ki Raat	Gowri	
1993	King Uncle	Mrs. Malik	
1994	Amaanat	Vandana	
