= Ameer Aadmi Gharib Aadmi =

1985 film

Ameer Aadmi Gareeb Aadmi
- Directed by: Amjad Khan
- Produced by: Vinay Kumar Sinha
- Starring: Shatrughan Sinha; Zeenat Aman; Amjad Khan
- Music by: R. D. Burman
- Release date: 24 May 1985
- Language: Hindi

Ameer Aadmi Gareeb Aadmi is a 1985 Hindi drama film, directed by Amjad Khan, starring Shatrughan Sinha, Kader Khan and Zeenat Aman in key roles.

== Plot ==
This is the story of Subhash, who works in a factory without sufficient wages. When he call for a strike he is entrapped by the authorities on false charges and arrested.

== Cast ==
- Shatrughan Sinha as Ashok Saxena
- Zeenat Aman as Kavita
- Amjad Khan as Akram
- Amitabh Bachchan (cameo) as Himself
- Parveen Babi (cameo) as Dancer in "Har Ek Rasta Sajake Chal"
- Kader Khan as Subhash
- Mazhar Khan as Brij aka Birju
- Shakti Kapoor
- Imtiaz Khan as Laal
- Kalpana Iyer
- Dinesh Hingoo as Mr. Bharucha
- Sharat Saxena as Joseph
- Gurbachan Singh as Cheena
- Harish Magon as Afzal
- Pinchoo Kapoor as Kapoor
- Vikas Anand as Vikas Seth
- Birbal as Lala Kodimal

== Soundtrack ==
1. "Paas Rehta Hai, Door Rehta Hai, Koi Dil MeJarur Rehta Hai" - Lata Mangeshkar
2. "Har Ek Rasta Sajake Chal" - Asha Bhosle
3. "Aisa Kyu Hota Hai" - Asha Bhosle
4. "Dhak Dhak Dhadke Ye Dil" - Suresh Wadkar, Kavita Krishnamurthy
5. "Nahi Jaana Kunwarji" - Penaz Masani
6. "Sarkari Damad Bano" - Shailendra Singh, Kishore Kumar
