= Chor Police =

- Directed by: Amjad Khan
- Produced by: Vinay Kumar Sinha
- Starring: Shatrughan Sinha; Parveen Babi; Shakti Kapoor; Kader Khan; Amjad Khan
- Music by: R. D. Burman
- Release date: 3 June 1983
- Country: India
- Language: Hindi

Chor Police is a 1983 Indian film, which is most famous for being the directorial debut movie of the Bollywood actor Amjad Khan. It stars Amjad Khan along with Shatrughan Sinha, Parveen Babi, Kader Khan and Shakti Kapoor in lead roles and features special appearances by Ashok Kumar, Nirupa Roy, Vinod Mehra, Bindiya Goswami, Imtiaz Khan, Zarina Wahab and Salah Alrifa (UAE).

== Plot ==
Inspector Sunil Rana has been assigned the case of triple-homicide of the Sinha family, namely Mr. Sinha, his son Inspector Rohan, and Rohan's wife. After an investigation, Sunil concludes that the assailant can only be Dr. Singh, who is going to escape from India, and re-locate to Dubai, United Arab Emirates, far from the jurisdiction of Mumbai Police. Sunil must overcome borders to apprehend Dr. Singh, and thus bring justice to the Sinha family. It is then Sunil realises that Dr. Singh is not the only one involved in this homicide, which is far more complicated that he had thought it to be.

== Cast ==
- Shatrughan Sinha as Inspector Sunil Rana
- Parveen Babi as Seema
- Shakti Kapoor as Tony
- Kader Khan as Dr. Singh
- Amjad Khan as Barkatullah Barkhi Khan
- Zarina Wahab as Anjana (friendly appearance)
- Imtiaz Khan as Dubai Police chief (friendly appearance)
- Ashok Kumar as Mr. Sinha (special appearance)
- Nirupa Roy as Mrs. Sinha (special appearance)
- Vinod Mehra Inspector Rohan Sinha (special appearance)
- Bindiya Goswami Mrs. Rohan Sinha (special appearance)
- Narendra Nath as Prakash
- Nazneen as Soni
- Kalpana Iyer as Ruby
- Gurbachan Singh as Charan
- Madhu Malhotra as Kitty
- Satyen Kappu as D.I.G. Ram Chadha
- Dinesh Hingoo as Mr. Naorozi
- Sudhir as Capt. Jaichand Malhotra
- Mac Mohan as Flamethrowing henchman Rafiq of Dr. Singh
- Vikas Anand as Dishonest builder Mohan

== Soundtrack ==
Composer: R. D. Burman Lyrics: Nida Fazli

Song	Singer
"Tumse Milke Zindagi Ko Yun Laga"	Lata Mangeshkar
"Meri Jawani Hai Chandi Sona"	Asha Bhosle
"Aaj Mera Dil Jhoom Jhoom"	Asha Bhosle
"Atkan Batkan Dahi Chatakan Chu Chu Bho Bho Meow"	Asha Bhosle, Vinod Sehgal
"Tum Kaho Aur Hum Sune, Hum Kahe, Tum Suno"	Asha Bhosle, Suresh Wadkar, Manna Dey, Vanita Mishra
