= Phaansi Ke Baad =

- Theatrical release poster
- Directed by: Harmesh Malhotra
- Starring: Shatrughan Sinha; Hema Malini; Ajit; Shakti Kapoor; Amrish Puri
- Music by: Anu Malik
- Production company: Eastern Films
- Release date: 25 January 1985
- Country: India
- Language: Hindi

Phaansi Ke Baad is a 1985 Indian Hindi-language thriller film directed and produced by Harmesh Malhotra. This film was released on 25 January 1985 under the banner of Eastern Films. The music direction of the film was by Anu Malik, and the songs are written by Anand Bakshi.

== Plot ==
Vijay is a renowned government advocate known for his exceptional success rate in court. He enjoys a popular reputation thanks to his efficiency and professionalism. The plot unfolds when Vijay's girlfriend, Swapna, stumbles upon crucial evidence that suggests the convicted murderer, Abbas, may be innocent.

Intrigued by Swapna's discovery, Vijay decides to embark on a secret investigation while simultaneously defending Abbas during his ongoing trial. As Vijay delves deeper into the case, he unravels a complex web of conspiracy and deceit.

However, before Vijay can complete his investigation or present the newfound evidence in court, he finds himself unexpectedly arrested by the police for another murder. This twist further complicates the situation, leaving Swapna and Abbas shocked and desperate to prove Vijay's innocence.

Inside the confines of the prison, Vijay faces a hostile environment filled with dangerous criminals and corrupt officials. Despite the odds stacked against him, Vijay perseveres, utilizing his legal expertise and resourcefulness to gather evidence and expose the real culprits.

Swapna, driven by unwavering faith in Vijay, works tirelessly on the outside to uncover the truth and clear his name. She unearths crucial witnesses, untangles hidden motives, and battles against powerful forces determined to silence her.

The climax of the film revolves around the dramatic courtroom proceedings where Vijay, now defending himself, presents the shocking revelations and irrefutable evidence that not only exonerate Abbas but also expose a deep-rooted conspiracy involving influential individuals.

With the truth finally revealed, Vijay emerges victorious, restoring his reputation and bringing the real culprits to justice. The film showcases Vijay's resilience, Swapna's determination, and the triumph of truth in the face of adversity.

== Cast ==
- Shatrughan Sinha as Vijay
- Hema Malini as Sapna
- Ajit as DIG Surendranath
- Shakti Kapoor as Abbas
- Amrish Puri as Damodar
- Iftekhar as Mohammed Riaz
- Urmila Bhatt as Sapna's Mother
- Jagdeep as Jaggi
- Madhu Malhotra as Neena
- Satyen Kappu as Sukhdev Walia
- Manik Irani as Montha

== Songs ==
Phaansi Ke Baad

Soundtrack album by Anu Malik
- Released: 1984
- Recorded: 1984
- Genre: Film soundtrack
- Label: T-Series

Anu Malik chronology
Ram Tera Desh (1984)	Phaansi Ke Baad (1984)	Mard (1985)

Song	Singer
"Mehboob Mere" (Male)	Mohammed Aziz
"Mehboob Mere" (Female)	Lata Mangeshkar
"Mehndi Kehti Hai Yeh Haal"	Anuradha Paudwal
"Motar Yaaron Ki, Chal Tujhe Sair Kara Doon"	Asha Bhosle, Shabbir Kumar
"Hoshilala Hoshilala Hoshilala, Zumbira Zumbira"	Shailendra Singh, Dilraj Kaur
