= Ajit (Hindi film actor) =

Indian film actor (1922 - 1998)

Ajit Khan
- Born: Hamid Ali Khan; 27 January 1922; Golconda, Hyderabad State, British India
- Died: 22 October 1998 (aged 76); Hyderabad, Andhra Pradesh, India
- Occupation: Actor
- Years active: 1945–1995
- Children: Shehzad Khan; Arbaaz Ali Khan

Hamid Ali Khan (27 January 1922 – 22 October 1998), better known by his stage name Ajit, was an Indian actor active in Hindi films. He acted in over two hundred movies over a period of almost four decades.

Ajit is also credited for starring as a lead actor in popular Bollywood movies such as Beqasoor, Nastik, Bada Bhai, Milan, Bara Dari, and later as a second lead in Mughal-e-Azam and Naya Daur.

== Early life ==
Ajit was born as Hamid Ali Khan into a Muslim family of Shahjahanpur and was brought up in Hyderabad city. The family belonged to the Barozai clan of (Kakar tribe) Pashtuns, Ajit's ancestors having moved from Kandahar in Afghanistan to Shahjahanpur in Uttar Pradesh before settling down in Hyderabad. His father was a personal driver of Nizam of Hyderabad Mir Osman Ali Khan.

== Career ==
According to Ajit's son Shehzad when Ajit first arrived in Mumbai from Hyderabad, he had so little money that he lived in cement pipes on Mohammad Ali Road. Local gangsters controlled these makeshift shelters and demanded protection money, but Ajit refused to pay, fought back, and soon became so respected that no one dared trouble him. In fact, people began offering him free tea, snacks, and meals out of respect. Initially in his career, he struggled to meet people and be accepted in any film project, and in order to feed himself, he worked as an "extra" in several films. Finally, he managed to land a leading role, and in the first couple of films, he is credited by his real name, Hamid Khan. He did not meet with much success, and on the advice of Nanabhai Bhatt, he took the name "Ajit" meaning "indomitable" as his screen-name, but his luck did not greatly improve. Although he did several films as a protagonist and became known to the public, and although his distinctive baritone voice and impressive personality brought him a fan following, his luck at the box office was not good at all. Film director K. Amarnath, who directed him in Beqasoor, suggested that the actor change his long name of Hamid Ali Khan to something shorter, and Hamid zeroed in on "Ajit". Beqasoor (1950), in which he acted with Madhubala, was one of the biggest hits of 1950. Ajit's films as hero include Nastik (1953), Bada Bhai, Milan, Baradari (1955) and Dholak (1951) and in all of them, he did credible work as actor. In Nastik (1953), the song "Dekh tere sansar ki haalat kya ho gayi Bhagwan" is picturised on him. He moved soon afterwards to second-lead roles, which he accepted because he had no other source of income. These movies include Naya Daur and Mughal-e-Azam.

Ajit, who ran away from home to Mumbai after selling his college books, started his career in films in the 1940s. Luck did not favor him in the beginning. He began with the 1946 movie Shahe Misra, acting opposite Geeta Bose, and also did films such as Sikander (with Van Mala), Hatimtai (1947), Aap Beeti (with Khursheed), Sone Ki Chidiya (with Leela Kumari), Dholak (1951) (with Meena Shori) and Chanda Ki Chandni (with Monica Desai) as her leading hero, but flopped. He did the most films (15) with Nalini Jaywant. Ajit switched over to playing the villain. His first movie as a villain was Suraj, followed by films such as Zanjeer and Yaadon Ki Baaraat (1973).

His famous dialogues included the "Mona darling" bit in Yaadon Ki Baraat, "Lily don't be silly" in Zanjeer and the one about a "Lion" in Kalicharan. Ajit's other well known films were Naya Daur, Nastik and Shikari to name only a few. In his four decades of film career, Ajit had acted along with the legendary Prithviraj Kapoor, Sohrab Modi, Amitabh Bachchan, I. S. Johar, Dilip Kumar, Dev Anand, Shammi Kapoor, Dharmendra and many actresses, both young and old.

In the mid-seventies, he had acted in over 57 films, mostly as a villain. His dialogue delivery remains popular even to this date.

=== Acting style ===
Ajit almost always portrayed the sophisticated, educated, well groomed evil mastermind, albeit heartless villain. Ajit was presented in striking western attire, the "bold" checked suits, matching overcoats, white leather shoes, wide sunglasses, jewellery accessories. Given his stature as a senior artist, Ajit was usually the gang leader to second tier villains (such as Jeevan, Prem Chopra, Ranjeet, Kader Khan and Sujit Kumar). He was rarely portrayed (in movie roles) doing any "dirty work" himself, rather relying on his army of henchmen for the task, with zero tolerance for any failures. He always had a savvy female accomplice, usually named "Mona." Acting in over 200 films, he specialized in playing suave villains with memorable catchphrases delivered in now iconic Ajit-style nasal drawls such as "Mona, darling". Ajit also brought to fame the smuggler as the villain. In his movies, he is generally seen smuggling gold biscuits in or out of the country. It has also been noted that most of his gang members had Christian names like Robert, Michael and Peter. He pronounced "Robert" as "Rabbert." This also has been used for comic purposes in parodies.

== Personal life ==
Ajit married three times. His first wife, whom he married after a brief love affair, was an Anglo-Indian and a Christian. The marriage was very short-lived and fell apart due to huge cultural differences and there were no children. Ajit married Shahida, a young lady of his own community and similar social background, in a match arranged by their parents in the usual Indian way. The marriage, which lasted till her death, was entirely harmonious and resulted in three sons, namely Shahid Ali Khan, Zahid Ali Khan and Abid Ali Khan. Ajit then married a third time, and the name of his third wife was Sara/Sarah. The actor Jayant (better known as the father of actor Amjad Khan) took the initiative to facilitate this marriage. Ajit has a further two sons by his third wife, named Shezad Khan and Arbaaz Khan.

Ajit had a strong friendship with actor Rajendra Kumar. Apart from friendship, Ajit also credited Rajendra Kumar with advising and helping him to become a "leading villain" rather than a second-lead hero. Rajendra Kumar was instrumental in getting Ajit his first role as the villain in the film Suraj.

== Death and survivors ==
Ajit died of a massive heart attack on 22 October 1998 in Hyderabad, India at the age of 76. His colleagues in the film industry — leading personalities who have acted with him, grew up seeing him in Mumbai — expressed deep sorrow over his death. Earlier in 1981, Ajit went into retirement after he underwent a heart by-pass surgery in the United States.

Indian writer Javed Akhtar, who scripted Zanjeer, said: "Like Bachchan, Ajit found a new image as villain after Zanjeer. He started a new innings in his career though he was an established hero in the fifties. His villainy started a new trend. Here was a new villain who was soft-spoken yet forceful. We wanted to give a different image to villainy which matched the hero".

== Filmography ==
Acting Filmography
Year	Film	Role
1995	Criminal	Jagdish Prasad
1994	Gangster	Chandulal Seth
1994	Aa Gale Lag Jaa	Kalka Singh
1994	Betaaj Badshah	Khan Chacha
1994	Aatish	Uncle (Underworld Don)
1993	Shaktiman	Shamsher Singh / Tiger
1993	Aadmi	Trikaal
1992	Jigar	Baba Thakur (Karate Instructor)
1992	Police Officer	Dindayal "D. D."
1985	Phaansi Ke Baad	D.I.G. Surendranath
1984	Raaj Tilak	Bhavani Singh
1984	Raja Aur Rana	Teja / Heeralal
1983	Daulat Ke Dushman	Jagga Thakur
1983	Razia Sultan	Amil Balban
1983	Mangal Pandey	Lal Singh / Jaganlal
1982	Chorni	Shambhu Dada
1981	Khoon Aur Paani	Thakur Vikram Singh
1981	Aakhri Mujra	
1981	Jyoti	Amirchand
1981	Khuda Kasam	Raizada Hukamchand
1980	Choron Ki Baaraat	Dhanraj
1980	Ram Balram	Jaggu / Chowdhary Jagatpal
1979	Heera-Moti	Pratap Singh
1979	Mr. Natwarlal	Inspector Girdharilal
1978	Aahuti	C.B.I. Officer Harnam Prasad
1978	Azaad	Seema's Uncle
1978	Des Pardes	Gurnam
1978	Heeralaal Pannalaal	Kalicharan
1978	Karmayogi	Keshavlal
1978	Ram Kasam	Inspector Ajit Singh
1977	Aakhri Goli	
1977	Chalta Purza	Captain Rajendra Behl
1977	Ankh Ka Tara	Ramlal
1977	Hum Kisise Kum Naheen	Sunita's Father (Guest Appearance)
1976	Jaaneman	Raja Sahib / Gulbahar Singh
1976	Charas	Kalicharan
1976	Kalicharan	Dindayal / Lion
1976	Sangram	Durjan
1976	Rangilla Ratan	Laxman Dada
1975	Do Jhoot	Nathulal
1975	Pratiggya	Bharat Daku
1975	Warrant	Master
1974	Badla	Pratap / Randhir
1974	Khote Sikkay	Jangha
1974	Paap Aur Punya	Balvir Singh
1974	Patthar Aur Payal	Ajit Singh
1973	Bandhe Hath	Inspector Kumar / Pakkad Singh
1973	Chhupa Rustam	Vikram Singh
1973	Dharma	IG Ajit Singh
1973	Jugnu	Boss
1973	Kahani Kismat Ki	Premchand
1973	Shareef Budmaash	Ranjit
1973	Yaadon Ki Baaraat	Shakeel
1973	Zanjeer	Dharam Dayal Teja
1972	Dil Ka Raaja	Thakur Gajendra Singh
1972	Sultana Daku	
1971	Andaz	Raju's Father
1971	Lal Patthar	Raja Raghav Shankar Rai
1971	Paraya Dhan	Heeralal Daku
1971	Patanga	Kunwar Amar Singh
1970	Heer Raanjha	Heer's husband
1970	Dharti	Diwan
1970	Jeevan Mrityu	Harishchandra "Harish"
1969	Aadmi Aur Insaan	Kundanlal / Sher Singh
1969	Prince	Shamsher's Mamaji
1968	Raja Aur Runk	Hariya
1967	Baghdad Ki Raatein	
1966	Suraj	Rajkumar Pratap Singh
1965	Main Hoon Aladdin	Aladdin
1965	Namaste Ji	
1963	Shikari	
1963	Kabli Khan	Kabli Khan
1962	Burmah Road	
1962	Tower House	Suresh Kumar
1962	Girls' Hostel	
1961	Opera House	Ajit Rai
1960	Mughal-e-Azam	Durjan Singh
1960	Baraat	Shyamu
1959	Char Dil Char Rahen	Dilawar
1959	Guest House	Amar
1958	Mehndi	
1957	Miss Bombay	
1957	Bada Bhai	
1957	Kitna Badal Gaya Insaan	
1957	Naya Daur	Krishna
1956	26 January	
1956	Aan Baan	
1956	Durgesh Nandini	
1956	Halaku	Parvez
1955	Aaj Ki Baat	
1955	Bara Dari	Ajit Singh
1955	Marine Drive	Ajit
1955	Naqab	
1955	Shahzada	
1955	Teerandaz	
1954	Maan	
1954	Nastik	Anil Kapoor / Babaji
1954	Samrat	
1952	Anand Math	
1952	Moti Mahal	
1952	Tarang	
1952	Vasna	
1951	Daman	
1951	Dholak	
1951	Saiyan	Vijay
1951	Sarkar	
1950	Beqasoor	Brij
1949	Jeevan Saathi	
1949	Patanga	
1945	Kurukshetra	
