= Manjula =

- Gender: Female
- Language: Sanskrit

Origin
- Meaning: Melodious
- Region of origin: India

Manjula (Sanskrit: मंजुला) is a Hindu and Sanskrit female given name, which means, "melodious".

== Notable people named Manjula ==
- Manjula (Kannada actress) (1954–1986), Indian actress
- Manjula Chellur (born 1955), Indian doctor and judge
- Manjula Dayal, Fijian businesswoman
- Manjula Dissanayake (born 1967), Sri Lankan politician
- Manjula Ghattamaneni (born 1970), Indian actress and producer
- Manjula Guruge (born 1981), Emirati cricketer
- Manjula Munasinghe (born 1971), Sri Lankan cricketer
- Manjula Padmanabhan (born 1953), Indian playwright, artist and writer
- Manjula Sood (1945–2025), Indian British politician
- Manjula Vijayakumar (1953– 2013), Indian actress
- Manjula Kumara Wijesekara (born 1984), Sri Lankan high jumper
- Mañjula (astronomer)/Muñjāla (fl. 932), Indian astronomer
- Sudath Manjula (born 1972), Sri Lankan politician

== Fictional characters ==
- Manjula Nahasapeemapetilon, from animated TV series The Simpsons

== Song ==
There was also a song by the name of Manjula. It was created by Indian singer Baba Sehgal.
