= Mangal Pandey (1983 film) =

1983 film by Harmesh Malhotra

- Directed by: Harmesh Malhotra
- Written by: Shakti Vaid; Ravi Kapoor
- Screenplay by: Ravi Kapoor
- Produced by: Harmesh Malhotra
- Starring: Shatrughan Sinha; Parveen Babi
- Cinematography: V. Durga Prasad
- Edited by: Govind Dalwadi
- Music by: Anu Malik
- Production companies: Eastern Films, Bombay
- Release date: 14 January 1983
- Running time: 138 minutes
- Country: India
- Language: Hindi

Mangal Pandey is a 1983 Indian Hindi-language action film, produced and directed by Harmesh Malhotra. It stars Shatrughan Sinha and Parveen Babi in the lead roles.

== Plot ==
Abused by his step-mother; Rajmer, Jaipur-based young Mangal faces more trauma when his father Havaldar Rajnath Pandey is shot dead by Daku Lal Singh. He then gets separated from his sister, Deepa, who is adopted by a drug dealer, Kulbhushan, who re-names him 'Tiger'; and then joins hands with criminal don, Jaganlal. Then he gets into a confrontation with Police Inspector Vijay Shukla and ends up killing him. Police launch a manhunt and ultimately come to the conclusion that he was killed in a train accident. He does survive and takes this opportunity to return home. He will be welcomed by a recently widowed Deepa but will face the shock of finding out that he was not only responsible for her widowhood but also had a hand in the abduction and subsequent trauma of his nephew, Munna.

== Cast ==
- Shatrughan Sinha as Mangal Pandey / Tiger
- Parveen Babi as Kavita
- Farida Jalal as Deepa Pandey
- Kader Khan as Inspector Vijay Shukla
- Ajit as Lal Singh / Jaganlal
- Satyen Kappu as Sarju / Suraj Singh
- Jagdeep as Parwaz Mirza
- Neeta Mehta as Sushma Gupta
- Manik Irani as Ustad
- Viju Khote as Kavita's molester in Pinto's Motel
- Sudhir as Sub-Inspector Desai
- Chandrashekhar as Constable Rajnath Pandey
- Iftekhar as Inspector / Superintendent R. P. Gupta
- Ashalata Wabgaonkar as Mrs. R. P. Gupta
- Ram Mohan as Sujit
- Mohan Sherry as Kulbhushan
- Yusuf Khan as Peter, the rapist who tries to rape Kavita

== Soundtrack ==
Mangal Pandey

Soundtrack album by Anu Malik
- Released: 1982
- Recorded: 1982
- Genre: Film soundtrack
- Label: Tips

Anu Malik chronology
Paagal Premee (1981)	Mangal Pandey (1982)	Ek Jaan Hain Hum (1983)

Song	Singer
"Surkh Joda Jo Pahenkar"	Kishore Kumar
"Nasha Jo Hai Shabab Mein"	Lata Mangeshkar
"Aate Ho Jaate Ho"	Asha Bhosle
"Mohabbat Na Hoti"	Asha Bhosle
"No Parking, No Parking"	Sharon Prabhakar
