= List of Hindi films of 1973 =

A list of films produced by the Bollywood film industry based in Mumbai in 1973:

== Highest-grossing films ==
These are the highest-grossing Hindi films of 1973. Gross collection figures are worldwide, unless otherwise noted.

Rank	Title	Gross collection	Notes
1	Bobby	₹17.79 crore	
2	Zanjeer	₹9.74 crore	
3	Jugnu	₹7 crore	Domestic gross
4	Kahani Kismat Ki	₹6.47 crore	
5	Daag	₹6.15—6.50 crore	Box Office India erroneously put the former figure as worldwide, and the latter as domestic.
6	Yaadon Ki Baaraat	₹5.50 crore	Domestic gross
7	Dharma	₹4.99 crore	
8	Loafer	₹4.50 crore	Domestic gross
9	Heera	₹3.68 crore	
10	Kuchhe Dhaage	₹3.52 crore	

== A-Z ==
Title	Director	Cast	Genre	Sources
Aa Gale Lag Jaa	Manmohan Desai	Shashi Kapoor, Sharmila Tagore, Shatrughan Sinha, Shoma Anand	Romance	
Aaj Ki Taaza Khabar	Rajendra Bhatia	Radha Saluja, Kiran Kumar	Action	
Aangan	Nasir Hussain	Farida Jalal, Deb Mukherjee, Indrani Mukherjee	Drama	
Abhimaan	Hrishikesh Mukherjee	Amitabh Bachchan, Jaya Bachchan, Bindu	Drama	
Achanak	Gulzar	Vinod Khanna, Farida Jalal	Crime	
Agni Rekha	Mahesh Kaul	Bindu, Sanjeev Kumar, Sharada, Asrani	Drama	
Anamika	Raghunath Jhalani	Sanjeev Kumar, Jaya Bachchan	Drama	
Anhonee	Ravi Tandon	Sanjeev Kumar, Leena Chandavarkar, Kamini Kaushal, Bindu	Drama	
Anokhi Ada	Kundan Kumar	Jeetendra, Rekha, Vinod Khanna	Romance	
Bada Kabutar	Deven Verma	Rehana Sultan, Amitabh Bachchan, Helen	Comedy	
Banarasi Babu	Shankar Mukherjee	Dev Anand, Raakhee, Yogeeta Bali	Drama	
Bandhe Haath	O. P. Ralhan	Amitabh Bachchan, Mumtaz	Action	
Barkha Bahar	Amar Kumar	Navin Nischol, Rekha	Romance	
Blackmail	Vijay Anand	Dharmendra, Raakhee, Madan Puri, Shatrughan Sinha	Thriller	
Bobby	Raj Kapoor	Rishi Kapoor, Dimple Kapadia, Pran	Romance	
Chhalia	Mukul Dutt	Navin Nischol, Nanda, Shatrughan Sinha	Action	
Chhupa Rustam	Vijay Anand	Dev Anand, Hema Malini, Vijay Anand	Action	
Daag	Yash Chopra	Rajesh Khanna, Sharmila Tagore, Raakhee	Romance	
Daaman Aur Aag	Vinod Kumar	Sanjay Khan, Saira Banu	Drama	
Dhamkee	Kalpataru	Subhash Ghai, Vinod Khanna, Kum Kum, Ranjeet	Thriller	
Dharma	Chand	Navin Nischol, Rekha, Pran, Ajit Khan, Prem Chopra	Action	
Dhund	B. R. Chopra	Sanjay Khan, Zeenat Aman, Danny Denzongpa	Thriller	
Dil Ki Rahen	B. R. Ishara	Rakesh Pandey, Rehana Sultan	Drama	
Door Nahin Manzil	Hari Walia	Pradeep Kumar, Sanjeev Kumar, Reshma, Manmohan Krishna	Drama	
Duvidha	Mani Kaul	Ravi Menon, Raisa Padamsee	Drama	
Ek Kunwari Ek Kunwara	Prakash Mehra	Rakesh Roshan, Leena Chandavarkar, Pran	Drama	
Ek Mutthi Aasmaan	Virender Sinha	Vijay Arora, Yogeeta Bali, Pran	Drama	
Ek Nari Do Roop	Madhusudhan	Nadira, Shatrughan Sinha	Drama	
Gaai Aur Gori	M. A. Thirumugam	Jaya Bachchan, Shatrughan Sinha	Drama	
Gaddaar	Harmesh Malhotra	Yogeeta Bali, Vinod Khanna, Pran	Drama	
Garm Hava	M. S. Sathyu	Balraj Sahni, Shaukat Azmi	Drama	
Gehri Chaal	C. V. Sridhar	Jeetendra, Hema Malini, Amitabh Bachchan	Thriller	
Ghulam Begam Badshah	Jambu	Shatrughan Sinha, Anil Dhawan, Moushumi Chatterjee	Drama	
Haathi Ke Daant	B. R. Ishara	Rakesh Pandey, Iftekhar, Asit Sen	Drama	
Hanste Zakhm	Chetan Anand	Navin Nischol, Priya Rajvansh, Balraj Sahni	Romance	
Heera	Sultan Ahmed	Sunil Dutt, Asha Parekh	Action	
Heera Panna	Dev Anand	Dev Anand, Raakhee, Zeenat Aman	Romance	
Hifazat	K. S. R. Das	Vinod Mehra, Asha Sachdev, Ashok Kumar, Lalita Pawar	Drama	
Hindustan Ki Kasam	Chetan Anand	Raaj Kumar, Priya Rajvansh, Amjad Khan, Amrish Puri	Action	
Honeymoon	Hiren Nag	Leena Chandavarkar, Anil Dhawan	Comedy	
Hum Sub Chor Hain	Marutirao Parab	Dara Singh, Sadhana Shivdasani	Action	
Insaaf	Adurthi Subba Rao	Waheeda Rehman, Tanuja, Vijay Arora, Pran	Drama	
Jaise Ko Taisa	Murugan Kumaran	Jeetendra, Reena Roy	Drama	
Jalte Badan	Ramanand Sagar	Kiran Kumar, Kumkum, Pradeep Kumar	Drama	
Jheel Ke Us Paar	Bhappi Sonie	Dharmendra, Shatrugan Sinha, Mumtaz, Pran	Romance	
Joshila	Yash Chopra	Dev Anand, Raakhee, Hema Malini, Pran	Thriller	
Jugnu	Pramod Chakravorty	Dharmendra, Hema Malini, Pran	Drama	
Jwaar Bhata	Adurthi Subba Rao	Dharmendra, Saira Banu	Drama	
Jyot Jale	Satyen Bose	Nirupa Roy	Drama	
Kahani Hum Sab Ki	Rajkumar Kohli	Vinod Mehra, Om Prakash, Lalita Pawar, Mala Sinha	Drama	
Kahani Kismat Ki	Arjun Hingorani	Dharmendra, Rekha	Action	
Kashmakash	Feroz Chinoy	Rekha, Feroz Khan, Shatrughan Sinha	Action	
Keemat	Ravikant Nagaich	Rekha, Dharmendra, Prem Chopra	Action	
Khoon Khoon	Mohammed Hussain	Danny Denzongpa, Rekha	Action	
Kuchhe Dhaage	Raj Khosla	Vinod Khanna, Kabir Bedi, Moushumi Chatterjee	Action	
Kunwara Badan	Vimal Tewari	Madhu Chanda, Paintal, Rakesh Pandey	Drama	
Loafer	A. Bhimsingh	Dharmendra, Mumtaz	Romance	
Maha Sati Savitri	Chandrakant	Jayshree Gadkar, Upendra Trivedi	Fantasy	
Manchali	Raja Nawathe	Sanjeev Kumar, Leena Chandavarkar	Romance	
Mehmaan	Kotayya Pratyagatma	Rekha, Biswajeet, Leela Chitwas	Crime	
Mera Desh Mera Dharam	Dara Singh	Dara Singh, Raj Kapoor, Meena Rai	Drama	
Nafrat	Shyam Ralhan	Rakesh Roshan, Yogeeta Bali	Romance	
Nai Duniya Naye Log	B. R. Ishara	Danny Denzongpa, Reena Roy	Drama	
Naina	Kanak Mishra	Shashi Kapoor, Moushumi Chatterjee, Rajshree	Drama	
Namak Haraam	Hrishikesh Mukherjee	Rajesh Khanna, Amitabh Bachchan, Rekha	Drama	
Nanha Shikari	Shomu Mukherjee	Tanuja, Deb Mukherjee, Laxmi Chhaya	Drama	
Naya Nasha	Hari Dutt	Nanda, Madan Puri	Action	
Nirdosh	S. M. Sagar	Vinod Mehra, Yogeeta Bali	Drama	
Paanch Dushman	Shyam Ralhan	Vinod Khanna, Pran	Action	
Phagun	Rajinder Singh Bedi	Dharmendra, Waheeda Rehman	Drama	
Pyaar Ka Rishta	Sultan Ahmed	Vinod Khanna, Shatrughan Sinha, Mumtaz		
Raja Rani	Sachin Bhowmik	Rajesh Khanna, Sharmila Tagore	Drama	
Rickshawala	K. Shankar	Mala Sinha, Randhir Kapoor, Neetu Singh, Pran		
Sabak	Jugal Kishore	Shatrughan Sinha, Poonam Sinha, K.N.Singh	Drama	
Samjhauta	Ajay Biswas	Anil Dhawan, Shatrughan Sinha, Yogeeta Bali		
Saudagar	Shubendu Roy	Nutan, Amitabh Bachchan, Padma Khanna	Drama	
Shareef Budmaash	Raj Khosla	Dev Anand, Hema Malini	Action Thriller	
Sone Ke Haath	P.D. Shenoy	Sanjay Khan, Babita Kapoor, Om Prakash	Action drama	
Suraj Aur Chanda	T. Madhava Rao	Sanjeev Kumar, Rita Haksar, Sujit Kumar, Jagdeep		
Teen Chor	Dada Mirasi	Vinod Mehra, Zaheeda, I.S.Johar	Drama	
Wohi Raat Wohi Awaaz	Dev Kishan	Samit Bhanja, Kamal Kapoor	Horror	
Yaadon Ki Baaraat	Nasir Hussain	Dharmendra, Zeenat Aman, Vijay Arora, Tariq Khan, Ajit Khan, Neetu Singh	Drama	
Yauwan	Ranjan Bose	Anil Dhawan, Yogeeta Bali, Sujit Kumar	Drama	
Zanjeer	Prakash Mehra	Amitabh Bachchan, Jaya Bachchan, Pran, Ajit Khan	Action	

== See also ==
- List of Hindi films of 1972
- List of Hindi films of 1974
