= Mumbaicha Jawai =

- Theatrical release poster
- Directed by: Raja Thakur
- Written by: Ram Kelkar
- Produced by: Tushar Pradhan
- Starring: Arun Sarnaik; Ranjeeta; Ratnamala; Sharad Talwalkar
- Cinematography: Arvind Lad
- Edited by: Bal Korde
- Music by: Sudhir Phadke
- Production company: Parijat Chitra
- Release date: 25 March 1970
- Running time: 105 minutes
- Country: India
- Language: Marathi

Mumbaicha Jawai (transl. Mumbai's son-in-law) is a 1970 Indian Marathi-language film directed by Raja Thakur and produced by Tushar Pradhan. The film stars Arun Sarnaik, Rajeeta, Ratnamala, Sharad Talwalkar. The film received National Film Award for Best Marathi Feature Film at the 18th National Film Awards.

The film was also released in the Soviet Union, along with other imported four Indian films including Mera Naam Joker, Aradhana, Bandhan, Pritidwandi. The film was remade in Hindi as Piya Ka Ghar released in 1972. The film was directed by Basu Chatterji, starred Jaya Bhaduri and Anil Dhawan in lead roles.

== Plot ==
Appa Ponkshe resides with his extensive family in a chawl in Mumbai. There, Rami's Daav, Avinash-Manju's play takes place. The younger son Arvind was married to Durga. Durga grew up in a spacious palace in Belgaum. Therefore, it is difficult for her to settle in a small place in Mumbai. Nandihalli, Durga's uncle, sees the place of Mumbai and leaves to take Durga back.

== Cast ==
- Arun Sarnaik as Avinash Ponkshe
- Surekha as Manju Ponkshe
- Rajeeta as Durga Ponkshe
- Raja Dani as Arvind Ponkshe
- Ratnamala as Pandari Ponkshe
- Sharad Talwalkar as Appa Ponkshe
- Narayan Bhave as Nandihalli
- Pushpa Bhosale
- Bhalchandra Kulkarni
- Ramchandra Varde
- Vimal Raut

== Production ==
The film was produced in Kolhapur's Jayprabha Studios.

== Music ==
The music is composed by Sudhir Phadke and lyrics are penned by G. D. Madgulkar.
