= Jeevan Sangram =

- Poster
- Directed by: Rajbans Khanna
- Produced by: Rajbans Khanna
- Starring: Shashi Kapoor; Radha Saluja; Padma Khanna
- Narrated by: Rajbans Khanna
- Music by: Kalyanji-Anandji
- Release date: 1974
- Country: India
- Language: Hindi

Jeevan Sangram (transl. Struggle of Life) is a 1974 Indian Hindi-language drama film. It follows passengers aboard the Komagata Maru and is based on subsequent events about Indian immigrants to Canada in the early 20th-century.

== Cast ==
- Shashi Kapoor as Arjun
- Jalal Agha
- Iftekhar as Police Inspector
- Padma Khanna as Allah Rakhi
- Manmohan
- Tarun Bose as Kirpal
- Ram Mohan as Abdul Police
- Murad
- Radha Saluja as Amba
- Asit Sen
- Tun Tun
- Om Shivpuri

== Music ==
1. "Aaj Ki Aaj Sunaaoon Yaaron Kal Ki Sunna Kal" – Asha Bhosle, Mahendra Kapoor
2. "Main Tere Desh Ki Ladki Tu Mere Desh Ka Ladka" – Asha Bhosle, Usha Mangeshkar
3. "Meri Zindagi Tumhaare Pyaar Pe Qurbaan Ho" – Narendra Chanchal
4. "Meri Zindagi Tumhaare Pyaar Pe Qurbaan Ho" v2 -Narendra Chanchal
5. "Meri Zindagi Tumhaare Pyaar Pe Qurbaan Ho" v3 – Narendra Chanchal
6. "O Laagi Laagi Yaari Hamaari" – Lata Mangeshkar
