= Geet Gaata Chal =

- Poster
- Directed by: Hiren Nag
- Written by: Story & Screenplay: Madhusudan Kalelkar; Sharad Pilgaonkar; Dialogues: Vrajendra Gaur
- Based on: Atithi by Rabindranath Tagore
- Produced by: Tarachand Barjatya
- Starring: Sachin; Sarika; Madan Puri
- Cinematography: Anil Mitra
- Edited by: Mukhtar Ahmed
- Music by: Ravindra Jain
- Distributed by: Rajshri Productions
- Release date: 16 October 1975
- Country: India
- Language: Hindi

Geet Gaata Chal (lit. 'Go on singing') is a 1975 Indian Hindi film directed by Hiren Nag and produced by Tarachand Barjatya. The film stars Sachin, Sarika, Madan Puri, Padma Khanna and Leela Mishra. The film's music was composed by Ravindra Jain. The film is loosely based on the short story Atithi by Rabindranath Tagore.

== Cast ==
- Sachin Pilgaonkar as Shyam
- Sarika as Radha
- Khyati as Meera
- Urmila Bhatt as Ganga
- Madan Puri as Colonel Sohan Singh
- Padma Khanna as Champa
- Manher Desai as Durga babu
- Leela Mishra as Buaji
- Dhumal as Champa's dance troupe owner
- Sunder as Jaram
- Agha as Dharampal Singh
- V. Gopal as Merry Go Round of Life
- Jr. Mehmood as Bankhe
- R. Tiwari as Jairam
- Minno Mumtaz
- Ramayan Tiwari
- Sarika Sachin
- Ravindra Jain

== Plot ==
Durga Babu, and his wife, Ganga, comes across Shyam, an orphan, who sings and dances on special occasions, and decide to take him home. Shyam meets with their daughter, Radha, and she slowly falls in love with him, but he thinks that she just wants to be friends. In his eyes, Shyam wants to be a free person, not tied down to anyone or anything, and would like to spend the rest of his life wandering, singing, and dancing. When he discovers that the family intend to get him married, he likens his plight to that of a caged bird, and flees, breaking Radha's heart. Will Shyam ever return? What impact will this have on the family?

== Soundtrack ==
#	Songs	Singer	Raga
1	"Bachpan Har Gham Se"	Kishore Kumar	
2	"Geet Gaata Chal O Saathi"	Jaspal Singh	
3	"Shyam Teri Bansi Pukare"	Jaspal Singh, Aarti Mukherji	Charukeshi
4	"Kar Gaya Kanha"	Aarti Mukherji	
5	"Main Wohi Darpan Wohi"	Aarti Mukherji	
6	"Shyam Abhimani"	Mohd. Rafi, Asha Bhosle	
7	"Dharti Meri Mata"	Jaspal Singh	
8	"Mangal Bhawan Amangal Haari" (Chaupayan Ramayan)	Jaspal Singh	
9	"Mohe Chhota Mila Bhartaar"	Jaspal Singh, Hemlata, Chetan	
