= Do Nambar Ke Amir =

Do Number Ke Ameer
- Directed by: P. D. Shenoy
- Produced by: Ram Dayal; Wazir Chand Diddi
- Starring: Jalal Agha, A.K. Hangal, I. S. Johar, Roopesh Kumar, Sujit Kumar, Asha Sachdev
- Music by: Sapan Jagmohan; Indeevar (lyrics)
- Release date: 26 April 1974
- Country: India
- Language: Hindi

Do Number Ke Ameer is a 1974 Bollywood social drama film directed by P.D. Shenoy.

== Cast ==
- Jalal Agha
- A.K. Hangal
- I. S. Johar
- Roopesh Kumar
- Sujit Kumar
- Asha Sachdev
- Bharat Bhushan
- Padma Khanna
- Kamal Kapoor
- Urmila Bhatt
- Asha Chandra
- Sajid
- Sonika
- Vijay Ganju as Bhagyavaan

== Music ==
Song	Singer
"Yeh Do Number Ke Ameer Hai"	Manna Dey
"Dil Kisi Ko Jo Diya Na Ho, Dil Kisi Se Jo Liya Na Ho"	Kishore Kumar, Asha Bhosle
"Roop Ka Nasha Hai"	Asha Bhosle
"Insaniyat Ke Naam Pe Koi"	Asha Bhosle
"Nashe Di Yeh Bandh Botalen"	Asha Bhosle
