= Awara Badal =

1964 film

Awara Badal is a 1964 Bollywood drama film directed by B. R. Ishara under the banner of Amarjyoti films. It starring Helen, Ajit and Leela Mishra in lead roles.

== Story ==
Abducted at a young age, a prince turns into a much feared masked bandit.

== Cast ==
- Helen
- Iftekhar
- Tun Tun
- Ajit as Bandit Badal
- Leela Mishra
- Mridula Rani

== Music ==
The film's songs were composed by Usha Khanna and penned by Javed Akhtar.

| No. | Song | Singer(s) |
|---|---|---|
| 1 | "Meri Jaan Na Zulfe Kholo Kahi Raat Thahar Na Jaye" | Mukesh |
| 2 | "Aamna Samna Tose Jab" | Kamal Barot, Asha Bhosle |
| 3 | "Chanke Mori Payal" | Asha Bhosle |
| 4 | "Dil To Nirala Hi Sharabi Hai" | Asha Bhosle |
| 5 | "Ek Hai Dil Pyar Bhara Kis Ko Mai Du" | Asha Bhosle |
| 6 | "Parwane Teri Shama Jal Uthi" | Asha Bhosle |
