= Balam Pardesia =

- Directed by: Nazir Hussain
- Starring: Rakesh Pandey; Padma Khanna
- Release date: 1979
- Country: India
- Language: Bhojpuri

Balam Pardesia is a Bhojpuri film, directed by Nazir Hussain and released in 1979, featuring Rakesh Pandey and Padma Khanna.

Songs from the film gained a measure of popularity outside of Bhojpur, including "Gorki Ptarki Re" and "Chadhte Phalgun", both sung by Mohd Rafi.

== Cast ==
- Rakesh Pandey
- Padma Khanna
- Leela Mishra
- Tun Tun

== Soundtrack ==
1. Gorki patarki re. (mukesh kumar, Asha bhosle)
2. Chadhte fagun jiara. (Md.Rafi)
3. Todke pijra. (Asha Bhosle)
4. Jaagat raha bhaiya (Md.Rafi)
5. Hansi ke je dekha (Asha Bhosle)
6. Chorwa na le jaaye (Md.Rafi)

== See also ==
- Bhojpuri Film Industry
- List of Bhojpuri films
