= Anil Dhawan =

Indian film and television actor

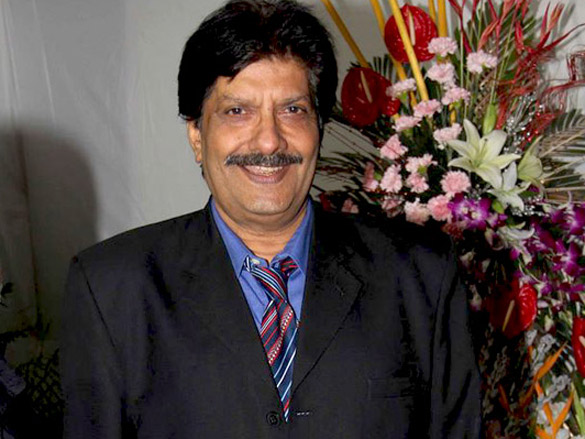
- Dhawan in 2009
- Occupation: Actor
- Years active: 1970–present
- Notable work: Piya Ka Ghar (1972); Chetna (1970); Andhadhun (2018)
- Spouse: Rashmi Dhawan
- Children: Siddharth Dhawan
- Relatives: See Dhawan family

Anil Dhawan is an Indian actor who appears in Hindi films and television. He made his acting debut with Chetna (1970) and followed it up with a big hit in Piya Ka Ghar (1971). He is also known for his 2018 film Andhadhun.

== Early life ==
Dhawan is from Kanpur, Uttar Pradesh, India. His father, Madan Lal Dhawan, was AGM in UCO Bank. Anil did his high school from St. Francis Xavier's School, Kanpur and graduated from Christ Church College, Kanpur. He later obtained a diploma in acting from Film and Television Institute of India, Pune, in the same batch as Jaya Bhaduri.

His son is actor Siddharth Dhawan. Director David Dhawan is his younger brother whose sons are director Rohit Dhawan and actor Varun Dhawan.

== Career ==
He joined Film and Television Institute of India as he wanted to become an actor. He entered Bollywood in the 1970s. His first film was B. R. Ishara's Chetna (1970). He worked with rising actor Aditya Pancholi in the television movie Sone Ka Pinjra (1986). Actress and director Asha Parekh directed him in the television serial Kora Kagaz in the 1990s. He has also worked in TV serial Roop - Mard Ka Naya Swaroop on Colors TV Channel.

== Filmography ==
Year	Film	Role	Notes	Ref.	Co–Star
1970	Chetna	Anil Dhawan			Rehana Sultan
1971	Pyar Ki Kahani	Ravi Sharma			Farida Jalal
1971	Man Tera Tan Mera	Deepak			Rehana Sultan
1971	Do Raha	Ravindra Kumar Bharati			Radha Saluja
1971	Jai Jawan Jai Makan				Jaya Bhaduri
1972	Piya Ka Ghar	Ram Sharma			Jaya Bhaduri
1972	Haar Jeet	Ashok Gupta			Rehana Sultan; Radha Saluja
1972	Annadata	Arun			Jaya Bhaduri
1972	Munimji	Rajesh "Suljhiram"			Yogeeta Bali
1972	Savera				Rehana Sultan
1972	Tanhai	Rakesh Kapoor			Rehana Sultan
1972	Anokha Daan				Zaheera
1973	Honeymoon	Chandrakant			Leena Chandavarkar
1973	Yauwan	Dr. Prem			Yogeeta Bali
1973	Rani Aur Jaani	S.P. Sajan Kumar Mehra			Aruna Irani
1973	Samjhauta	Gopal			Yogeeta Bali
1973	Ghulam Begam Badshah	Gopal			Moushumi Chatterjee
1973	Shaitaan	Advocate Manish			Poonam Sinha
1973	Loafer	Anil Mehra	Guest Appearance		Farida Jalal
1974	Hawas	Anil Kumar			Neetu Singh
1975	Anari	Amit Rai	Special Appearance		
1975	Ek Hans Ka Jora	Anil			Zaheera
1976	Nagin	Kiran			
1976	Do Shatru	Lover Boy In song "Rab Na Kare"	Special Appearance		Aruna Irani
1976	Sikka	Ramesh			Ambika Johar
1976	Zindagi	Naresh Shukla			Aruna Irani
2011	Rascals	Inspector Prithviraj Rana			
2013	Himmatwala	Dharamurti Verma			Zarina Wahab
2016	Khel Toh Ab Shuru Hoga	Mr. Sharma			
2018	Andhadhun	Pramod Sinha			Tabu
2020	Shaheed Chandrashekhar Azad	Seetaram Tiwari			Pushpa Verma
2020	Coolie No. 1	Mahendra Pratapsingh			
2021	Shiddat				
2022	Love Jaisa Pyaar	Vidya's Father			
2022	48 Kos	Dhaniram			
2022	Match Of Life	Viraj's Father			Sudha Chandran
2024	Bade Miyan Chote Miyan				
2025	Mitthu Singh Da Vyaah				

- Sikka (1976)
- Nagin (1976)
- Zindagi (1976)
- Durgavahini (1976) As Chethan Perera
- Took Ka Badboo (1976) As Amit
- Saheb Bahadur (1977)
- Lal Kothi (1978)
- Ghata (1978)
- Darwaza (1978)
- Beqasoor (1980)
- Oh Bewafa (1980)
- Mahfil (1981)
- Saajan Ki Saheli (1981)
- Do Posti (1981)
- Maut Ka Saya (1982)
- Raakh aur Chingari (1982)
- Chandani Bani Chudel (1984)
- Avinash (1986)
- Mere Baad (1988) Rakesh Malhotra
- Taaqatwar (1989)
- Purani Haveli (1989)
- Daata (1989)
- Gola Barood (1989)
- Parchhaeen (1989)
- Khatarnaak (1990)
- Karishma Kali Kaa (1990)
- Aandhiyan (1990)
- Teri Talash Mein (1990)
- Mast Kalandar (1991)
- Khooni Panja (1991)
- Ajooba Kudrat Ka (1991)
- Khoon Ka Karz (1991)
- Hai Meri Jaan (1991)
- Aakhri Cheekh (1991)
- House No. 13 (1991)
- Mehboob Mere Mehboob (1992)
- Insaan Bana Shaitan (1992)
- Muskurahat (1992)
- Geet (1992)
- Yuhi Kabhi (1994)
- Khuddar (1994)
- Ekka Raja Rani (1994)
- Gangster (1994)
- Teesra Kaun? (1994)
- Sarhad: The Border of Crime (1995)
- Yaraana (1995)
- Laalchee (1996)
- Loafer (1996)
- Daadagiri (1997)
- Bhayaanak Panja (1997)
- Hero No. 1 (1997)
- Chudail (1997)
- Do Ankhen Barah Hath (1997)
- Tarazu (1997)
- Mr. and Mrs. Khiladi (1997)
- Hitler (1998) as Kishorilal
- Laash (1998)
- Hatyara (1998)
- Hogi Pyaar Ki Jeet (1999)
- Hote Hote Pyar Ho Gaya (1999)
- Haseena Maan Jaayegi (1999)
- Khooni Shikanja (2000)
- Papa the Great (2000)
- Chal Mere Bhai (2000)
- Jodi No.1 (2001)
- Waah! Tera Kya Kehna (2002)
- Shikaar (2004)
- Ho Jaata Hai Pyaar (2005)
- Kyon Ki... (2005)
- Jahan Jaaeyega Hamen Paaeyega (2007)
- Sanam Hum Aapke Hain (2009)
- U R My Jaan (2011)
- Rascals (2011)

=== Television ===
- Sone Ka Pinjra (1986) (TV film)
- Trikon (1990) (TV film)
- Parampara (1993–1998) as Ashok Malhotra
- Toofan (1999) as Rahmat Khan
- Kkusum (2003) as Raman Kanwar
- Tum Bin Jaaoon Kahaan (2003–2005) as Avinash Mathur
- Humsafar : The Train (2007) as Subhash Kapoor: Shivani 's Father
- Main Lakshmi Tere Aangan Ki (2011–2012) as Lakshmi's father
- Pyaar Ka Dard Hai Meetha Meetha Pyaara Pyaara (2013) as Manik Deewan
- Bhagyalaxmi (2015) as Murlimohan Shukla
- Roop - Mard Ka Naya Swaroop (2018) as Avinash Dixit
- Sirf Tum (2021–2022) as Devendra Oberoi
- Meet: Badlegi Duniya Ki Reet as Jeetesh Chaudhary
