= Milap =

Milap may refer to:

== Films ==
- Milap (1937 film), 1937 Indian film
- Milap (1955 film), 1955 Indian film
- Milap (1972 film), 1972 Indian film

== Persons ==
- Milap Chand Jain, Chief Justice of Dehli High Court
- Milap Mewada, Indian cricketer
- Milap Zaveri, Indian film director
