= Agent 009 =

- Promotional Poster
- Produced by: S.V.S.Films
- Starring: Vijendra Mittal; Rehana Sultan; Madhushala; Padma Khanna
- Music by: Sonik Omi
- Release date: 1980
- Country: India
- Language: Hindi

Agent 009 is a 1980 Indian Hindi-language film produced by S.V.S.Films, starring Vijendra Mittal, Rehana Sultan, Madhushala and Padma Khanna.

== Cast ==
- Vijendra Mittal
- Rehana Sultan
- Madhushala
- Padma Khanna

== Soundtrack ==
Song	Singer
"Aag Laga Di Pani Mein"	Kishore Kumar
"Teri Umar Ka Saal"	Asha Bhosle
"Sun Mere Sai Baba"	Chandrani Mukherjee
"Maharaja Maharaja"	Dilraj Kaur
