= Nawab Sahib =

1978 Hindi film directed by Rajinder Singh Bedi

- Poster
- Directed by: Rajinder Singh Bedi
- Written by: Rajinder Singh Bedi
- Produced by: Satnam Rohra
- Starring: Rehana Sultan; Parikshit Sahni; Tamanna; Farida Jalal; Johnny Walker
- Music by: C. Arjun
- Release date: April 1978
- Country: India
- Language: Hindi

Nawab Sahib is a 1978 Hindi film written and directed by eminent Urdu litterateur Rajinder Singh Bedi, starring Rehana Sultan, Parikshit Sahni, Tamanna, Farida Jalal and Johnny Walker in lead roles.

The film with the receding feudal culture as its thematic background had lyrics by the poet Sahir Ludhianvi composed by C. Arjun.

== Cast ==
- Om Prakash as Nawab Sahib
- Rehana Sultan as Salma's Sister
- Parikshat Sahni as Shaukat Ali
- Tamanna as Salma
- Johnny Walker as Hameed
- Farida Jalal as Memuna
- Ranjeet
- Veena as Farida
- Chand Usmani as Begum
- Bharat Bhushan as Salma's Father

== Soundtrack ==
The music was composed by C. Arjun and the lyrics was penned by Sahir Ludhianvi

Track	Song	Singer(s)	Duration
1	"Uss Jane Do Alam Ka Jalwa"	Mohammed Rafi, Manna Dey	7:48
2	"Ik Khwab E Tamanna"	Asha Bhosle	3:39
3	"Ab Se Pehle"	Usha Mangeshkar	3:45
4	"Ladke Ki Main Aaj Mubarak"	Johnny Whiskey	3:13
5	"Hum Main Hai Kya"	Mohammed Rafi	4:24
