= Raja Thakur =

Indian film director

- Born: Rajaram Dattatraya Thakur; 26 November 1923; Ponda, Bombay Presidency (now Goa), British India
- Died: 28 July 1975 (aged 51); Pune, Maharashtra, India
- Occupation: Film director

Raja Thakur (1923–1975) was an Indian film director who primarily worked in the Marathi film industry. He is best known for his films Me Tulas Tujhya Angani (1955), Rangalya Ratree Ashya (1962), Ektee (1968), Mumbaicha Jawai (1970), Gharkul (1971) and Jawai Vikat Ghene Aahe (1972); for which he won National and State-level awards.

== Career ==
Thakur was born in 1923 in Phonda near Kolhapur, Maharashtra. He started his film career as assistant to Master Vinayak and Raja Paranjape and directed various films in the 1960s based on storylines of middle-class Maharashtrian people. This genre was a repeated feature in directorial works of Thakur and Rajdutt, who dominated the industry before the comedies of Dada Kondke became popular in the 1970s. He also produced films under his banner "Nav Chitra".

The 1955 social film Me Tulas Tujhya Angani was produced under his banner Nav Chitra and had Hindustani classical music-based songs sung by Bhimsen Joshi. It won the President's Silver Medal for Best Feature Film at the 3rd National Film Awards. In continuation of the film adaptations of works written by Damuanna Malvankar and V. S. Jog which Master Vinayak made, Thakur directed the 1957 comedy Gharcha Jhala Thoda.

The 1962 film Rangalya Ratree Ashya was a musical based on the story by author Ranjit Desai and starring Arun Sarnaik as a talented drummer who falls in love with a courtesan. The film earned him another President's Silver Medal at the 10th National Film Awards. Starring Kashinath Ghanekar, Thakur achieved his third National Film Award for Ektee (1968) at the 16th National Film Awards.

The 1970s directorial venture Mumbaicha Jawai was a depiction of cosmopolitan Mumbai and how a newly married couple embraces social values while living in the crowded chawl. The film was also released in the Soviet Union and later adapted into a Hindi film by Basu Chatterjee as Piya Ka Ghar. The film won the fourth National Film Award presented at the 18th National Film Awards and also the "Best Film" award at the Maharashtra State Film Awards. He went on to bag the Maharashtra State Film Award, presented by the State Government of Maharashtra, consecutively for the next two years for Gharkul (1971) and Jawai Vikat Ghene Aahe (1972).

In 1975 Thakur directed his first Hindi film Zakhmee. Produced by Tahir Hussain, the film had a star cast of Sunil Dutt, Rakesh Roshan and Asha Parekh. In 1976 his Hindi film Raeeszada was released. Produced by V. L. Khare, the film starred Vikram, Zarina Wahab, Rakesh Roshan, Shriram Lagoo and Helen. In 1972 he also directed an English film Birbal My Brother.

== Filmography ==
Thakur directed the following films:

- 1953 – Bolavita Dhani
- 1954 – Reshamchya Gaathi
- 1955 – Me Tulas Tujhya Angani
- 1956 – Mazhe Ghar Majhi Manse
- 1957 – Gharcha Jhala Thoda
- 1957 – Uthavla Narad
- 1958 – Gaja Gauri
- 1959 – Rajmanya Rajashri
- 1961 – Putra Vhava Aisa
- 1962 – Rangalya Ratri Asha
- 1963 – Pahure Kiti Vaat!
- 1965 – Raigadacha Rajbandi
- 1966 – Dhananjay
- 1967 – Sant Gora Kumbhar
- 1968 – Ekati
- 1970 – Mumbaicha Jawai
- 1970 – Gharkul
- 1971 – Bajiravacha Beta
- 1971 – Ajab Tuzhe Sarkar
- 1972 – Birbal My Brother (English)
- 1973 – Jawai Vikat Ghene Aahe
- 1975 – Zakhmee (Hindi)
- 1976 – Raeeszada (Hindi)

== Awards and recognition ==
Thakur's four directorial pursuits won the National Film Award in the Best Feature Film in Marathi category. He made a hat-trick by winning the Maharashtra State Film Awards in Best Film category from 1970 to 1972 and is the only director to do so. In 2013, the Marathi-weekly magazine Lokprabha of the Indian Express Group included Me Tulas Tujhya Angani and Mumbaicha Jawai in their "Must Watch 40 Marathi Films" list.

Year	Award	Category	Work	Notes	Ref.
1955	National Film Award	National Film Award for Best Feature Film in Marathi	Me Tulas Tujhya Angani	Shared with production house Nav Chitra	
1962	National Film Award	National Film Award for Best Feature Film in Marathi	Rangalya Ratree Ashya	Shared with production house The Maharashtra Film Industrial Co-Operative Society Ltd.	
1968	National Film Award	National Film Award for Best Feature Film in Marathi	Ektee	Shared with producer G. Chaugle	
1970	National Film Award	National Film Award for Best Feature Film in Marathi	Mumbaicha Jawai	Shared with producer Tushar Pradhan	
1970	Maharashtra State Film Awards	Best Film	Mumbaicha Jawai		
1971	Maharashtra State Film Awards	Best Film	Gharkul		
1972	Maharashtra State Film Awards	Best Film	Jawai Vikat Ghene Aahe		
