= Jai Jawan Jai Makan =

- Directed by: Vishram Bedekar
- Starring: Jaya Badhuri; Anil Dhawan
- Release date: 24 December 1971
- Country: India
- Language: Hindi

Jai Jawan Jai Makan is a 1971 Bollywood drama film directed by Vishram Bedekar. The film stars Jaya Badhuri and Anil Dhawan.
