= Asha Sachdev =

Indian actress

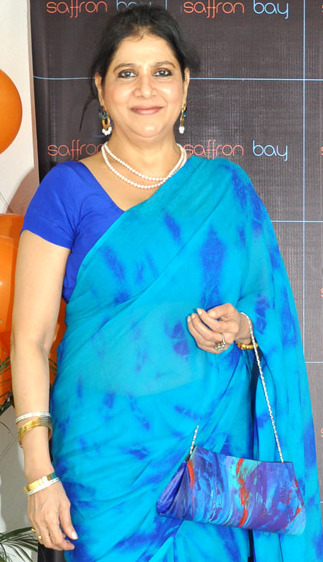
- Sachdev in 2012
- Born: Nafeesa Sultan; 27 May 1956 (age 70); Bombay, Bombay State, India
- Occupation: Actress
- Years active: 1972–present
- Relatives: Anwar (brother); Arshad Warsi (half-brother)

Nafeesa Sultan (born 27 May 1956), better known as Asha Sachdev, is an Indian former actress who worked in Hindi films during 1970s and 1980s. She acted in a few early films as a leading lady, including the spy film Agent Vinod (1977) and the thriller Woh Main Nahin, and later shifted to supporting characters. She has appeared in over 90 films in her career and is a recipient of a Filmfare award for her work in Priyatama (1978).

Sachdev starred in a few successful films including Hifazat (1973) and Ek Hi Raasta (1977). The latter featured the song "Jis Kaam Ko Dono Aye Hai", picturised on her and Jeetendra; it remains popular till date, along with the qawwali "Pal Do Pal Ka " from The Burning Train (1980).

== Personal life ==
Sachdev was born as Nafeesa Sultan on May 27, 1956. She is the daughter of actress Raziyah (who later changed her name to Ranjana) and musician Ahmed Ali Khan (Ashiq Hussain). After her parents divorced and her mother remarried, she adopted the stage name "Asha Sachdev", from the name of her stepfather. Singer Anwar is her brother and through her father's second marriage she is the half-sister of actor Arshad Warsi. Later in her life, Sachdev converted from Islam to Hinduism.

In 2018, Sachdev revealed that she was engaged to a man named Kishen Lal in her youth, but he died shortly after, in an accident. She is unmarried till date.

== Career ==
Sachdev was an alumna of the Film and Television Institute of India, Pune and joined Bollywood. She began her career in a low-budget film Double Cross in 1972, wherein she played a bold and dynamic role; the film was a flop. She subsequently played the leading lady in Hifazat (1973) and was appreciated for her good performance and the songs, especially "Yeh Mastaani Dagar" and "Hamrahi Mera Pyar", which became popular. Somehow the image stuck and thereafter she was offered only supporting and bold characters. Her bare dare appearance in red hot pants in the Navin Nischol-Rekha star thriller Woh Main Nahin (1974), which was remake of Naan Avan Illai, created a storm and she was flooded with item dance offers and vamp roles.

She occasionally received offers in the leading role, as in Agent Vinod and Ek Hi Raasta (both 1977), which became hits. She won the Filmfare Award for Best Supporting Actress for her role as Neetu Singh's best friend in Priyatama in 1978. In the role, she wore a simple saree and was bespectacled throughout the film. Some of her other notable films include Mama Bhanja, Lafange, Mehbooba, Satte Pe Satta, Duniya Meri Jeb Mein, The Burning Train, Judaai, Prem Rog and Eeshwar. In the late 1980s, she moved to television, acting in serials throughout the 90s.

She made a comeback to films later in the 2000s and was seen playing character roles in films like Fiza (2000), Aghaaz, Jhoom Barabar Jhoom (2007) and Aaja Nachle (2008). In television, she worked in the early soap opera, Buniyaad (1986), and in 2008, she also appeared in the series, Jugni Chali Jalandhar on SAB TV, with actor Ranjeet.

== Filmography ==
=== Films ===
Year	Film	Role	Notes
1972	Bindiya Aur Bandook		
1972	Double Cross	Lily	
1973	Hifazat	Asha	
1973	Haathi Ke Daant		
1973	Kashmakash	Ritu	
1973	Ek Nari Do Roop		
1974	Parinay		
1974	Do Nambar Ke Amir		
1974	Woh Main Nahin		
1974	Do Chattane		
1974	Vada Tera Vada		
1975	Lafange	Leena	
1976	Mehbooba	Rita Malhotra	
1976	Ladki Bholi Bhali		
1976	Harfan Maulaa		
1977	Mama Bhanja		
1977	Agent Vinod	Anju Saxena	
1977	Priyatama	Renu	
1977	Ek Hi Raasta		
1977	Nana Ranger Dinguli		Bengali Film
1978	Anjane Mein		
1978	Khoon Ka Badla Khoon		
1978	Bhookh		
1978	Nanna Prayaschittha	Dr Aasha	Kannada Film
1978	Assignment Bombay		
1978	Aahuti		
1979	Bebus		
1980	The Burning Train	Ramkali	
1980	Judaai		
1981	Jwala Daku	Bijli	
1981	Nakhuda	Courtesan	
1981	Pyar Ki Manzil		
1981	Roohi		
1981	Kanhaiyaa		
1982	Satte Pe Satta	Guru's girlfriend	
1982	Suraag	Renu Lamba	
1982	Begunah Qaidi		
1982	Prem Rog		
1982	Raakh Aur Chingari		
1983	Humse Na Jeeta Koi		
1983	Kanku Ni Kimat		Gujrati Film
1983	Pyaasi Aankhen		
1984	Sardaar	Dilshad Begum	
1984	Ek Nai Paheli	Jeet Kumari	
1984	Hanste Khelte		
1984	Maang Saja Do Meri		
1984	Kanoon Kya Karega		
1984	Kunwari Bahu		
1985	Mujhe Kasam Hai		
1985	3D Saamri	Maria	
1985	Karm Yudh		
1985	Patthar		
1985	Jaago		
1986	Locket		
1987	Jaago Hua Savera		
1987	Pyar Ke Kabil		
1988	Padosi Ki Biwi	Asha	
1988	Akhri Muqabla		
1988	Do Waqt Ki Roti		
1989	Eeshwar	Village Washerwoman	
1989	Shagun		
1990	Baaghi	Leelabai	
1990	Agneepath	Chanda Bai	
1991	Kohraam		
1992	Deewana		
1992	Ishq Khuda Hai		
1993	Chandra Mukhi	Kamini Rai	
1995	Barsaat		
1995	Kartavya	Roop Sundari (Ugranarayan's wife)	
1995	Oru Abhibhashakante Case Diary		Malayalam Film
1997	Kaun Rokega Mujhe		
2000	Fiza	Ulfat	
2000	Aaghaaz		
2000	Tune Mera Dil Le Liyaa		
2002	Kabhie Tum Kabhie Hum		
2003	Stumped		
2006	Rafta Rafta – The Speed		
2007	Jhoom Barabar Jhoom		
2007	Aaja Nachle		
2008	Tandoori Love		English Film
2010	Pankh		
2010	Dunno Y... Na Jaane Kyon		

=== Television ===
Year	Serial	Role	Channel	Notes
1986-1987	Buniyaad	Shanno	DD National	
2000	Eena Meena Deeka		DD Metro	
