= Saiyan Tore Karan =

- Directed by: Radhakant
- Produced by: Dhaneshwar Singh
- Starring: Rakesh Pandey; Padma Khanna; Kumud Chhugani
- Music by: Chitragupt
- Release date: 1981
- Country: India
- Language: Bhojpuri

Saiyan Tore Karan is a (Bhojpuri for For you my love)is a 1981 Bhojpuri language social drama film produced by Dhaneshwar Singh directed by Radhakant. The film stars Rakesh Pandey, Padma Khanna and Kumud Chhugani in the lead roles. The music for the film was composed by Chitragupt.

== Cast ==
- Rakesh Pandey
- Padma Khanna
- Kumud Chhugani

== Soundtrack ==
The film's music was composed by Chitragupt.

No.	Title	Singers
1	Gor Gor Dahiyanse	Talat Mahmood, Usha Mangeshkar
2	Tohre Patri Kamaria Patang Goria	Suresh Wadkar, Usha Mangeshkar
3	Bichhua Baaje Tekuliya Hanse	Asha Bhosle, Chorus
4	Aisan Basuria Bajao	Usha Mangeshkar
5	Naahi Bisri Suratia	Asha Bhosle
