= Lakhon Me Ek =

1971 film by S. Balasubramanian

- Poster
- Directed by: S. S. Balan
- Written by: K. Balachander
- Based on: Ethir Neechal (1968)
- Starring: Mehmood; Radha Saluja; Pran; Aruna Irani
- Music by: R. D. Burman
- Production company: Gemini Studios
- Release date: 9 April 1971
- Country: India
- Language: Hindi

Lakhon Me Ek (transl. One in a million) is a 1971 Indian comedy-drama directed by S.S. Balan, starring Mehmood and Radha Saluja. The film explores the bond between characters played by Pran and Mehmood and is a remake of the Tamil film Ethir Neechal. It was a Hit at Box office.

== Plot ==
Lakhon Me Ek centers on Bhola (Mehmood), who struggles to survive by running errands in a Bombay chawl. Despite his constant efforts, he finds it difficult to make ends meet and often pleads with residents for food in exchange for his work, facing frequent rejection.

Sher Singh, who has a soft spot for Bhola, and Dindayal provide him with some support. Leela, a demanding senior citizen, is the mother of Gauri (Radha Saluja). When Gauri arrives at the chawl, she finds comfort and companionship with Bhola.

Bhola's life is a balancing act between managing various chores and pursuing his studies, with his education sponsored by a kind-hearted professor (David). He longs for care and affection, which he receives from Gauri, who is drawn to his simple way of life.

The story takes a dramatic turn when a wealthy man (Madan Puri) arrives from Singapore, claiming that Bhola is his son and that he has come to offer him his name and inheritance.

== Cast ==
- Mehmood as Bhola
- Radha Saluja as Gauri
- Pran as Sher Singh
- Aruna Irani as Renu
- Madan Puri as Jaggu
- Nazir Hussain as Dindayal
- Mukri as Makhanlal
- Kanhaiyalal as Manoharlal
- Lalita Pawar as Leela
- Ramesh Deo as Keshavlal
- Shubha Khote as Jayshree
- Keshto Mukherjee as Mr. Chatterjee
- Sulochana Chatterjee as Sumitra Chatterjee
- Jalal Agha as Jeevan
- David as Professor

== Soundtrack ==
Song	Singer
"Chanda O Chanda" (Female)	Lata Mangeshkar
"Jogi O Jogi, Pyar Mein Kya Hoga"	Lata Mangeshkar, Kishore Kumar
"Chanda O Chanda" (Male)	Kishore Kumar
"Main Tera Naam Janun Na"	Asha Bhosle
"Yeh Duniya Khel Tamasha, Ghadi Mein Tola, Ghadi Mein Masha"	Asha Bhosle, Mohammed Rafi
"Mere Samnewale Kamre Mein Ek Bhade Ka Tattoo Rehta Hai"	Asha Bhosle, Manna Dey
