= Yuhi Kabhi =

- Directed by: Kumar Bhatia
- Produced by: S.P.Kukreja
- Starring: Manisha Koirala; Ashok Kumar; Tinnu Anand; Anil Dhawan; Archana Puran Singh; Parikshat Sahni
- Music by: Nikhil Vinay
- Production company: Komal Pictures
- Release date: 18 February 1994
- Country: India
- Language: Hindi

Yuhi Kabhi is a 1994 Bollywood romance drama film produced by S.P.Kukreja, directed by Kumar Bhatia starring Anil Dhawan, Ashok Kumar, Parikshat Sahni in lead roles.

== Plot ==
Rajoo lives alone and works in a decent company. He also has a girlfriend, who he intends to marry, that being Pooja. God suddenly appears to Rajoo one day and asks him to spread His word. Naive Rajoo does so, and this results in chaos, misunderstandings, and confusion. And as a result poor Rajoo is hauled up in Court, and the only one witness that can save Rajoo is God.

== Cast ==
- Anil Dhawan
- Ashok Kumar
- Parikshat Sahni
- Manisha Koirala
- Navin Nischol
- Tinnu Anand
- Bhagwan Dada
- Archana Puran Singh

== Soundtrack ==
#	Title	Singer(s)
1	"Tum Ho Agar Saath Mere"	Udit Narayan
2	"Yuhi Kabhi Kuch Mil Gaya Hai"	Kumar Sanu
3	"Kai Baar Pehle"	Kavita Krishnamurthy, Udit Narayan
4	"Yuhi Kabhi Kuchh Mil Gaya" v2	Kumar Sanu
5	"Chikna Chikna Chikna Chow"	Udit Narayan, Kavita Krishnamurthy
