= Maa Ka Aanchal =

- Directed by: Jagdev Bhambri
- Starring: Sanjeev Kumar; Leela Mishra; Anjana Mumtaz
- Music by: Madan Mohan
- Release date: 1970
- Country: India
- Language: Hindi

Maa Ka Aanchal is a 1970 Bollywood drama film directed by Jagdev Bhambri. The film stars Sanjeev Kumar and Leela Mishra.

== Plot ==
The film revolves with the life of Shanti, A Kind-Hearted lady. she has the responsibility of her family hence dutiful to her Family Members. but her life changes after marriage.

== Cast ==
- Sanjeev Kumar as Bhagwan Dada
- Anjana Mumtaz
- Abhi Bhattacharya
- Leela Mishra
- Master Ratan
- Johnny Whisky

== Soundtrack ==
Serial	Song title	Singer(s)
1	"Bhanwar Mein"	Asha Bhosle
2	"Duniya Ke Saare Mardon Ko"	Asha Bhosle and Mukesh
3	"Jaane Kya Haal Ho"	Asha Bhosle
4	"Maa Hai (version 1)"	Mohammed Rafi
5	"Maa Hai (version 2)"	Mohammed Rafi
6	"Maa Hai (version 3)"	Mohammed Rafi
7	"Maa Ka Aanchal"	Asha Bhosle
8	"Tere Jhuthe Waade"	Asha Bhosle
9	"Waqt Meherbaan Hai"	Asha Bhosle
