= Khooni Shikanja =

Khooni Shikanja is a Hindi horror fantasy film of Bollywood directed by Yeshwant. This film was released in 2000. The music director of Khooni Shikanja was Bappi Lahiri.

== Plot ==
Shankar marries Shefali for her huge properties. Shankar's family members plot to kill their daughter in law. They rape and murder her but Shefali's soul comes out from the grave as a murderous vengeful spirit who kills Shankar's family members one by one.

== Cast ==
- Navin Nischol as Inspector Amar
- Raza Murad as Pravin Parekh
- Kiran Kumar as SPI Arjun
- Anil Dhawan as Thakur Pratap
- Dinesh Hingoo as Johnny
- Isha Gupta as Shefali
- Hitesh Patel as Shankar
- Rajender Kaur as Anita
- Lekha Govil as Vinita
- Birbal as Pandit
- Usha Singh as Ananya
