= Ooparwala Jaane =

Ooparwala Jane
- Directed by: Naresh Saigal
- Starring: Vinod Mehra; Rehana Sultan
- Music by: Laxmikant-Pyarelal
- Release date: 1977
- Country: India
- Language: Hindi

Ooparwala Jane is a 1977 Bollywood film directed by Naresh Saigal. The film stars Vinod Mehra and Rehana Sultan.

== Soundtrack ==
The film has only one track.

- "Jo Na Bujhe Aesi Aag" – Noor Jehan
