= Do Chattane =

- Directed by: G. H. Sarin
- Release date: 14 June 1974
- Country: India
- Language: Hindi

Do Chattane is a 1974 Bollywood action film directed by G. H. Sarin.

== Cast ==
- Vikram as Rana
- Rakesh Pandey as Ramzan
- Asha Sachdev as Asha
- Aruna Irani as Aruna
- Om Prakash as Pagal Chacha
- Alka as Farida
- Chandrashekhar as Abdul
- V. Gopal as Radheyshyam
- Jankidas as Dhaniram's associate
- D.K. Sapru as Dhaniram
- Joginder Shelly as Raka (as Joginder)
- Sunder as Sitaram

== Music ==
#	Song	Singer
1	"Tera Pyaar Khuda"	Mohammed Rafi, Manna Dey
2	"Khushaal Ji Khushaal"	Mohammed Rafi, Manna Dey
3	"Aatta Nahin, Chawal Nahin"	Mohammed Rafi, Manna Dey
4	"Mud Yaar Mera Ghar Aaya"	Asha Bhosle, Minoo Purushottam
5	"Jisne Dekha Woh Bola"	Asha Bhosle
