= Log Kya Kahenge (film) =

1982 film by B. R. Ishara

- Directed by: B. R. Ishara
- Produced by: B. R. Ishara
- Starring: Shabana Azmi; Shatrughan Sinha; Sanjeev Kumar
- Music by: Kalyanji-Anandji
- Release date: 1982
- Country: India
- Language: Hindi

Log Kya Kahenge (transl. What Will People Think?) is a 1982 Indian Hindi-language film produced and directed by B. R. Ishara. It stars Sanjeev Kumar, Shabana Azmi, Shatrughan Sinha and Navin Nischol in pivotal roles. The title "Log Kya Kahenge" refers to the common stigma facing women in Indian society who are expected to behave in a certain manner and agree to prearranged marriages. The film deals with themes of murder and adultery.

== Plot ==
Roma is forced into a pre-arranged marriage with a widower. She comes to detest her husband and his son and the life that has been enforced upon her. She begins an affair with another man. One day her stepson discovers her with the other man and she kills him to prevent him from telling her husband. Ultimately she also kills her husband as her mental health declines and she becomes insane.

== Cast ==
- Sanjeev Kumar as Dr. Jeevan
- Shabana Azmi as Roma
- Shatrughan Sinha as Ram Sinha
- Navin Nischol as Gopal
- Aruna Irani as Sadhna
- Leela Mishra

== Themes and reception ==
The name "Log Kya Kahenge" (What will People Think) stems from a common Indian yardstick and social stigma against women who may challenge social norms of marriage and other expected forms of behaviour, a "stress-inducing" expectation surrounding women and arranged marriages. One author said "In our sheltered Indian middle class homes, for every woman there is an unconsciously used Indian yardstick called, 'log kya kahenge'."

The film was not amongst the blockbusters of 1982 and neither is it regarded today as a classic of Hindi cinema, remaining largely forgotten. However, the film draws upon the concept of women and challenging society and is therefore remarkable for the social situation of the era. The film gained some notoriety for the scene in which Roma throttles her husband's son to prevent him from informing her husband of her affair with another man, and shocked viewers in India. Shabana herself said light-heartedly of the scene, "I remember seeing that completely evil look on my face ... and I was shocked by it. Was I capable of such evil?" The Hindustan Times cited the scene amongst Hindi cinema's best-known and best-loved mother-oriented "moments of magic on the screen". "The Women of South Asian Descent Collective" highlights the theme of divine justice in the film, saying, "In Log Kya Kahenge, the heroine takes the ultimate step in asserting her right to choose her spouse: she murders the husband forced on her. Consequently, she is punished not only by the law of the land but by divine justice – she becomes insane."

== Soundtrack ==
Music to the film was scored by Kalyanji-Anandji.

Song	Singer	Lyricist
"Tere Bina Main, Mere Bina Tu" (version 1)	Kishore Kumar, Lata Mangeshkar	Naqsh Lyallpuri
"Tere Bina Main, Mere Bina Tu" (version 2)	Kishore Kumar, Lata Mangeshkar	Naqsh Lyallpuri
"Teri Parchhaiyan Meri Raahon Mein Hai"	Mohammed Rafi	Naqsh Lyallpuri
"Mere Pyar Ki Nakaami Ne Mujhe Kis Mod Pe"	Anuradha Paudwal	Naqsh Lyallpuri
"Aap Kyun Udaas Hai"	Asha Bhosle	Indrajeet Singh Tulsi
"Yeh To Kisi Yug Mein Saha Nahin Jaayega"	Manhar Udhas	Indeevar
