= Indru Pol Endrum Vaazhga =

1977 film by K. Shankar

- Theatrical release poster
- Directed by: K. Shankar
- Written by: K. Kalimuthu
- Produced by: V. D. L. Subbhaiya; V. D. L. S. P. Lakshamanan
- Starring: M. G. Ramachandran; Radha Saluja; Vennira Aadai Nirmala
- Cinematography: T. V. Raja Ram
- Edited by: K. Shankar; S. M. Sundharam
- Music by: M. S. Viswanathan
- Production company: Subbu Production
- Release date: 5 May 1977
- Country: India
- Language: Tamil

Indru Pol Endrum Vaazhga (transl. Live Forever Like Today) is a 1977 Indian Tamil-language film, directed by K. Shankar, starring M. G. Ramachandran, Radha Saluja and Vennira Aadai Nirmala. It was released on 5 May 1977.

== Plot ==
Murugan is a do-gooder who loves his village and the village loves him. Murugan's betrothed, Ganga, insults him and his village when they start talking about solemnising the marriage stating that she would marry only an educated, stylish, well-to-do man. Because he was insulted by his betrothed, Murugan vows to find a bride who is more stylish and better educated than her. He leaves for the city with the villager's blessings. There he meets Menaka who is the daughter of Pandari Bai and sister of Kumar. Unknown to Murugan, Kumar is the guy who Ganga was in love with and was cheated by him. He impresses Menaka with his simplicity, honesty and integrity. With the blessings of Guruviah, a man who lost his leg while saving Menaka when she was a child, he makes her see people matter more than money. They propose marriage as she falls in love but Kumar stands in the way. Kumar is exposed as Ganga's lover and when all insist on him marrying Ganga, he takes her at gun point and kidnaps her. He is finally subdued by Murugan who reforms him and gets them married as he marries Menaka.

== Cast ==
- M. G. Ramachandran as Murugan
- Radha Saluja as Menaka
- Vennira Aadai Nirmala as Ganga, Kumar's lover
- Vijayakumar as Kumar
- M. N. Nambiar as Guruviah
- Thengai Srinivasan as "All in All" Arunachalam
- K. Kannan as Kanna, Kumar's manager
- V. Gopalakrishnan as Gobi
- S. V. Sahasranamam as Maya's father
- Trichy Soundararajan as K. P. Swamy (alias Kuppuswamy), Ganga's father
- Pandari Bai as Kumar and Menaka's mother
- Peeli Sivam as Villager
- S. N. Lakshmi as Maya's mother
- Karikol Raju as Villager
- Idichapuli Selvaraj as Kuppuswamy's secretary
- Samikkannu as Villager
- T. K. S. Natarajan as Housekeeper

== Production ==
The film was launched at Sathya Studios. M. A. Muthiah Chettiar switched on the camera while L. Krishnan, chairman of Bank of Madura started the shoot. The dialogues for the film were written by former MLA K. Kalimuthu. This was Radha Saluja's last film with M. G. Ramachandran.

== Soundtrack ==
The soundtrack was composed by M. S. Viswanathan. The songs "Anbukku Naan Adimai" and "Idhu Nattai Kaakum" were well received and, extensively promoted by Ramachandran during his election campaigns. An article in The Washington Post noted that both songs were instrumental in the All India Anna Dravida Munnetra Kazhagam's victory in the 1977 Indian general election in Tamil Nadu.

Track listing
No.	Title	Lyrics	Singer(s)	Length
1.	"Ithu Nattai Kaakkum Kai"	Muthulingam	T. M. Soundararajan	4:03
2.	"Pudhumai Pengal"	Pulamaipithan	Vani Jairam	5:36
3.	"Welcome Hero"	Na. Kamarasan	T. M. Soundararajan, P. Susheela & Sasirekha	5:51
4.	"Anbukku Naan Adimai"	Muthulingam	K. J. Yesudas	4:44
5.	"Idhayathil Irundhu"	Pulamaipithan	T. M. Soundararajan & P. Susheela	4:39
6.	"En Yoga Jaathagam"	Vaali	S. P. Balasubrahmanyam & Vani Jairam	5:52
Total length:				30:45

== Critical reception ==
Kanthan of Kalki appreciated the photography, direction and music, but criticised the title's lack of relevance to the story.
