= Dastak (1970 film) =

1970 Hindi film directed by Rajinder Singh Bedi

- Directed by: Rajinder Singh Bedi
- Screenplay by: Rajinder Singh Bedi
- Based on: Naql-e-Makaani by Rajinder Singh Bedi
- Produced by: Rajinder Singh Bedi
- Starring: Sanjeev Kumar; Rehana Sultan; Anju Mahendru
- Cinematography: Kamal Bose
- Edited by: Hrishikesh Mukherjee
- Music by: Madan Mohan
- Release date: December 31, 1970
- Running time: 140 minutes
- Country: India
- Language: Hindi

Dastak (transl. The Knock) is a 1970 Indian Hindi-language drama film and the directorial debut of Rajinder Singh Bedi, who wrote the script too. Bedi based it on his own radio play Naql-e-Makaani, broadcast on All India Radio in Lahore in tha year 1944. Sanjeev Kumar and Rehana Sultan play Hamid and Salma, newlyweds who rent a flat in Bombay once occupied by a courtesan, Shamshad Begum. At the very beginning, they settle in. Men keep arriving at the door asking for her, and the couple finds itself caught in the social stigma still attached to the flat.

Madan Mohan composed the score, Majrooh Sultanpuri wrote the lyrics, and Lata Mangeshkar and Mohammed Rafi sang the all the songs of the fil. At the 18th National Film Awards, the film won Best Actor for Kumar, Best Actress for Sultan and Best Music Direction for Madan Mohan..

== Plot ==
The story is around Hamid and Salma, a verry recently married couple who move into a rented flat in Bombay. Only after settling in, they learn that the rooms had earlier been occupied by Shamshad Begum, a mujrewali whose clients continue to arrive at the address looking for her. The repeated knocks at the door, which give the film its title, gradually disturb in some way the couple's privacy and draw suspicion onto them because of the flat's former occupant.

== Cast ==
- Sanjeev Kumar as Hameed
- Rehana Sultan as Salma
- Anju Mahendru as Maria
- Shakeela as Shamshad
- Kamal Kapoor as Brijmohan
- Manmohan Krishna as Shahid
- Anwar Hussain as Marativale
- Dev Kishan as Mirza
- Niranjan Sharma
- Jagdev
- Yash Kumar

== Music ==
Madan Mohan composed the score within a classical framework built on dholak rhythms and raga-based melodies. Lata Mangeshkar's playback singing for the film can be described as among her finest work.

=== Lyrics ===
Majrooh Sultanpuri wrote all lyrics of the film, which center on the suffering of Salma, framing her as an object of judgment in the eyes of society.

=== Songs ===
- Baiyan Na Dharo - Lata Mangeshkar - based on Raga Charukesi
- Hum UnHain Mata-e-Koocha-o-Bazaar Ki Tarah - Lata Mangeshkar - based on Raga Bhairavi (Hindustani)
- Mai Ri Mein Kaa Se Kahoon Pirr Apne Jiya Ki – Lata Mangehskar/Madan Mohan - based on Raga Puriya Dhanashree
- Tumse Kahoon Ek Baat - Mohammed Rafi

== Critical reception ==
Sukanya Verma of Rediff.com described it as rejecting "conventional ideas of filmmaking to produce a nuanced, uncompromised vision, which slams the inconsistencies and ethics of social structure through ordinary, imperfect people." Dastak was featured in Avijit Ghosh's book, 40 Retakes: Bollywood Classics You May Have Missed. In a retrospective review, Sukanya Verma of Rediff.com wrote, "It [Dastak] rejects conventional ideas of filmmaking to produce a nuanced, uncompromised vision, which slams the inconsistencies and ethics of social structure through ordinary, imperfect people. Yet shows how it’s these very ordinary, imperfect people who battle it in spirit till the very end."

== Awards ==
- 1971 National Film Award for Best Actor - Sanjeev Kumar
- 1971 National Film Award for Best Actress - Rehana Sultan
- 1971 National Film Award for Best Music Direction - Madan Mohan
- 1972 Filmfare Best Cinematographer Award - (B&W) - Kamal Bose

== See also ==
- Parallel cinema
- Muslim social
