= Man Jaiye =

- Directed by: B. R. Ishara
- Starring: Rakesh Pandey; Rehana Sultan
- Music by: Jaidev
- Release date: 1972
- Country: India
- Language: Hindi

Man Jaiye is a 1972 Bollywood drama film directed by B. R. Ishara. The film stars Rakesh Pandey, Rehana Sultan and Jalal Agha.

== Story ==
Suman Acharya (Rehana Sultan) is a feminist. She meets Ajay Sharma (Rakesh Pandey) who is conservative in his views of women. They unexpectedly get attracted and get married against the wishes of Suman's father. Ajay's friend Ashok predicts that their marriage would never last due to their opposing views.

Their marriage starts off smoothly. Ajay is a lecturer, and Suman works as a secretary. However, ongoing issues with money and adjusting ruin their lives to the point where they get divorced after four years.

Immediately after their divorce they both take the same train to Suman's hometown and end up in the same compartment. By coincidence, Ashok also boards the same train. Suman cannot accept that their marriage has failed. She persuades Ajay to pretend as a happily married couple in front of Ashok.

After all of them reach their destination Suman and Ajay manage to hoodwink Ashok. Suman takes a lodging at a hotel. Ajay roams the streets and is spotted by Ashok. Ashok assumes that Ajay had an argument with Suman and reunites them. Ashok's constant praise of his wife irk both Ajay and Suman.

Both of them try to leave the hotel but are forced to come back. Ashok also helps them in subtle ways to get past their differences. Suman and Ajay finally realize that rather than expecting the other to be an ideal wife or husband they should accept each other as they are. It is revealed that the girl who loved Ashok left him before their marriage was fixed. To cope up with her loss, Ashok pretends to be happily married and whenever he meets couples having a dispute, he tries to reunite them.

== Cast ==
- Rakesh Pandey as Ajay Sharma
- Rehana Sultan aa Suman Acharya / Suman A. Sharma
- Jalal Agha as Ashok
- Asit Sen as Jathashankar Bholenath
- Leela Mishra
- Madhumati

== Soundtrack ==
The songs composed by Jaidev and penned by Naqsh Lyallpuri were immensely meaningful and touching, specially Yeh Wohi Geet Hai Jisko Maine which Jalal Agha enacts with a pretend girlfriend.

=== Track listing ===
1. "Yeh Wohi Geet Hai" - Kishore Kumar
2. "Le Chalo" - Vani Jairam, Mukesh
3. "O Mitwa" - Lata Mangeshkar
