= Abodh =

- Poster
- Directed by: Hiren Nag
- Produced by: Tarachand Barjatya
- Starring: Tapas Paul; Madhuri Dixit; Vinod Sharma
- Music by: Ravindra Jain
- Distributed by: Rajshri Productions
- Release date: 10 August 1984
- Country: India
- Language: Hindi

Abodh (English: Innocent) is a 1984 Bollywood film directed by Hiren Nag. It marked the debut of actress Madhuri Dixit and the Bollywood debut of Bengali actor Tapas Paul. The lyrics and music of the film are by Ravindra Jain.

== Plot ==
Naive, childish, and precocious, Gauri lives in a small town with her parents. Gauri's parents are in search of a groom for her. At a fair, she argues with a boy called Shankar, in which Shankar's grandmother supports Gauri. After that, Shankar's grandmother sees Gauri singing in the evening prayer at the Shiv temple. His grandmother makes the decision that Gauri will be a perfect match for Shankar. Shortly thereafter, Gauri's marriage is fixed. She is at first quite happy, not knowing who her groom is, thanks to the huge present she is receiving. When Gauri is told that her marriage has been arranged, she is thrilled at first, then changes her mind when she finds out that her groom is Shankar, but finally reconciles herself to the marriage.

After she relocates to Shankar's residence, she spends much of her time playing with Shankar's little brother. Her husband starts to realize that Gauri has not matured yet. He is unable to become intimate with her. Gauri soon becomes bored. When one day, Shankar tries to force Gauri to be intimate with him, the gap between Gauri and Shankar deepens.

After Gauri's sister, Ratna, is married and returns home, Gauri visits her. Ratna explains to Gauri the meaning of the sacred relationship between a husband and wife. Gauri, realizing the importance of marriage and intimacy, asks her sister-in-law to arrange a vehicle for her to go to her in-laws' house. However, Gauri arrives at her in-laws' house at the same time that Shankar departs for his college studies, relocating to study in another town after feeling guilty for forcing Gauri to be intimate with him.

For several months, the family has not gotten any news about him. In the meantime, Ratna visits Gauri in her in-laws' house, where she learns the difference between Gauri and her husband. Shankar's father, Gajanan Singh, visits the hostel where his son is supposed to be staying; however, Gajanan finds that Shankar left the hostel a day before without saying when he would return. For three months, Shankar goes missing.

In the end, Shankar meets Gauri's sister Ratna by chance at a fair. After talking to Ratna, Shankar realises that Gauri has matured and loves him. Ratna also explains to Shankar that Gauri is living in deprivation because of his absence. He runs back to meet Gauri. They reconcile and live happily ever after.

== Cast ==
- Tapas Paul as Shankar Singh
- Madhuri Dixit as Gauri
- Vinod Sharma as Gajanan Singh: Shankar's father
- Leela Mishra as Shankar's grandmother: Gajanan's mother
- Sheela David as Ratna
- Rajshri Nair as Rajshri
- Savita Prabhune as Gauri's sister-in-law
- Dinesh Hingoo as Wedding Photographer
- Mohan Choti as Photographer at Fair
- Sunder Purohit
- Ashok Saraf as Hanuman

== Soundtrack ==
1. "Ghani Ghani Amariya" - Hemlata
2. "Ghani Ghani Amraiyo (Part-2)" - Hemlata
3. "Tujhe Dekhne Ko Tarasti Hai Aankhe Yeh Dil" - Suresh Wadkar
4. "Mandir Ki Murti Si Baithi" - Hemlata, Suresh Wadkar
5. "Ghir Aaye Megh Parbat Pe Bijuriya Chamke" - Hemlata
6. "Saamb Sada Shiv, Saamb Sada Shiv" - K. J. Yesudas
7. "Chandra Baal Shobitam" - Hemlata
