= Ek Nazar =

1972 film by B.R. Ishara

- Directed by: B. R. Ishara
- Written by: B. R. Ishara
- Produced by: Anil Khanna; A. C. Diwan
- Starring: Amitabh Bachchan; Jaya Bachchan
- Music by: Laxmikant-Pyarelal
- Release date: 28 July 1972
- Running time: 127 minutes
- Country: India
- Language: Hindi

Ek Nazar (transl. One Look) is a 1972 Bollywood romance film directed by B. R. Ishara. The film stars Amitabh Bachchan and Jaya Bachchan in lead roles, with Nadira playing a tyrant. This is also the debut film of Raza Murad.

Although the film is one of the lesser known films of Amitabh's early career, he and Jaya fell in love on the set of Ek Nazar, and wed in 1973.

== Plot ==
Akash is a poet and writer who while walking through a market one day overhears one of his poems being sung at a courtesan's house. He can't help but go in and meet Shabnam who is a singer and dancer there. She is an admirer of Akash's work but doesn't know him. The acquaintance soon turns into love for each other. But neither the courtesan's mother Amina Bai nor Akash's father is willing for the relationship. Things take a turn when Shabnam is accused of Amina Bai's murder. Can Akash's lawyer friend Ashok save Shabnam ? Will the society accept them being together ? The film answers these questions and also looks at other morals which are placed on others but not on oneself.

== Cast ==
- Amitabh Bachchan as Manmohan Tyagi / Akash
- Jaya Bhaduri as Shabnam
- Nadira as Ameena Bai
- Tarun Bose as Raghunath Tyagi
- Raza Murad as Ashok
- Manmohan Krishna
- Asit Sen as Popatlal Begana
- Dulari as Kalavati
- Sudhir as Deepak / Nawab Shaukatjung
- Johnny Whisky
- Rashid Khan
- Hari Shukla
- Daya Devi
- Kamlabai Gokhale
- Raja Duggal
- Hameed

== Songs ==
1. "Pyar Ko Chahiye Kya Ek Nazar" – Kishore Kumar
2. "Ae Gham-E-Yaar Bata Kaise JiyaKarte Hain" – Mahendra Kapoor
3. "Humeen Karen Koi Soorat UnhenBulane Ki" – Lata Mangeshkar
4. "Patta Patta Boota Boota" – Mohammed Rafi, Lata Mangeshkar
5. "Pehle Sau Baar Idhar Aur Udhar Dekha Hai" – Lata Mangeshkar

All lyrics penned by Majrooh Sultanpuri.
