= Suresh Chatwal =

Indian film actor

- Born: 1947; Bombay, Bombay Province, India
- Died: 28 May 2016 (aged 68–69); Mumbai, Maharashtra, India
- Occupation: Actor
- Years active: 1969–2016
- Children: Yaman Chatwal

Suresh Chatwal was an Indian film actor who has performed in films as well as television serials. He has acted in Hindi films mainly as a supporting actor. He has worked in Films like Mili, Phool Aur Kaante, Kaya Palat,Uphaar, and Munna Bhai MBBS.

== Career ==
After getting a break, Chatwal made his acting debut in the year 1969 with "Rakhi Rakhi". and was seen in films like Phool Aur Kaante Karan Arjun, Koyla, and Munna Bhai MBBS. He also portrayed the role of the Commissioner of Police in the popular sitcom F.I.R., where he showcased his strong acting abilities and a natural flair for comic timing. His performance was widely appreciated, with his dialogue delivery and comedic sensibilities contributing significantly to the show's success.

== Death ==
He died on 28 May 2016 in Mumbai.

== Filmography ==
- Rakhi Rakhi (1969)
- Uphaar (1971)
- Piya Ka Ghar (1972)
- Mere Bhaiya (1972)
- Kunwara Badan (1973)
- Honey Moon (1973)
- Agni Rekha (1973)
- Alingan (1974)
- Mili (1975)
- Aaina (1977)
- Swami (1977 film) (1978)
- Beqasoor (1980)...Shetty
- Sitara (1980)
- Chehre Pe Chehra (1981)
- Be-Shaque (1981)
- Naram Garam (1981)
- Yeh To Kamal Ho Gaya (1982)
- Pyar Ke Rahi (1982) as Inspector Rajan
- Apmaan (1983)
- Kaya Palat (1983)
- Saaheb (1985)
- Paththar (1985) as Investigating Police Officer
- Sheesa (1986)
- Aaj (1987)
- Taqdeer Ka Tamasha (1988)
- Lootera Sultan (1990)
- Thanedaar (1990)
- Indrajeet (1991)
- Phool Aur Kaante (1991)
- Lambu Dada (1992)
- Jaan Se Pyaara (1992)
- Khoon Ka Sindoor (1993)
- Dhartiputra (1993)
- Dil Ki Baazi (1993)
- Dalaal (1993)
- Ganga Aur Ranga (1994)
- Saajan Ki Baahon Mein (1995)
- Karan Arjun (1995)
- Gundaraj (1995)
- Fauji (1995 film)
- Diljale (1996)
- Ziddi (1997 film)
- Koyla (1997)
- Daadagiri (1997)
- Phool Bane Patthar (1998) as Customs Officer Gupta
- Barood (1998) as Sunder
- Pardesi Babu (1998)
- Kya Kehna (2000)
- Karobaar: The Business of Love (2000)
- One 2 Ka 4 (2001)
- Mujhe Meri Biwi Se Bachaao (2001)
- Hawa (2003)
- Munna Bhai M.B.B.S(2003)
- Lakeer (2004)
- Bhola in Bollywood (2004)
- Jo Bole So Nihaal (2005)
- Om Shanti Om (2007)
- Nakshatra (2010)
- Naam 2024 film (2024) (Posthumous Release)

=== Television ===
Year	Serial	Role	Notes
1986	Nukkad	Dukhiya	
1988	Intezaar	tea-stall owner	
1993	Naya Nukkad	Dukhiya	
1993	Junoon	Manmohan Dhanraj	
1994	Tehkikaat	Police Inspector Bhinde	
1998	"Raja aur Rancho"	Various Characters	
1999	Grahak Dost	Various characters	
2006–2015	F.I.R.	Commissioner Suraj Agnihotri	
