= Bazaar Band Karo =

Bazaar Band Karo is a 1974 Bollywood film directed by B. R. Ishara and starring Asha Chandra and Manher Desai.

== Reception ==
Film World described the film as making "no impact on the public".

== Music ==
Song	Singer
"Mohe Kar De Bida"	Mukesh
"Nahin Chhodoge Kabhi Mera Saath, Sajan Moh Se"	Kishore Kumar, Asha Bhosle
"Pyaasi Nigahon Me Sajan"	Asha Bhosle
"Har Ek Dil Ko Humne"	Asha Bhosle
