= Bhaiya Dooj =

1984 Indian Bhojpuri-language film

- Directed by: Qamar Narvi
- Screenplay by: Khalid Narvi
- Produced by: Raj Kataria
- Starring: Sujit Kumar; Padma Khanna; Rakesh Pandey; Gauri Khurana
- Edited by: Padmakar
- Music by: Chitragupt
- Production companies: S M K Films, Banaras
- Release date: 1984
- Running time: 148 minutes
- Country: India
- Language: Bhojpuri

Bhaiya Dooj (Bhojpuri for a festival, also known as Bhai Dooj, that celebrates a brother and sister's love, connection, and togetherness) is an Indian Bhojpuri-language film directed by Qamar Narvi released in 1984. The film was produced by Raj Kataria under the banner of S M K Films. Lead roles in the film are played by Sujit Kumar, Padma Khanna and Rakesh Pandey. The film follows orphaned siblings Ramu and Bela, who escape abusive guardians and grow up sustaining one another through hardship, with their enduring bond forming the emotional core of the narrative.

== Plot ==
The film opens with the death of a widowed mother who, in her final moments, entrusts the care of her young children, Ramu and Bela, to her sister and brother in law. Instead of providing the protection and affection she had hoped for, the guardians subject the children to neglect and mistreatment. Unable to endure the harsh environment, Ramu and Bela run away from home and grow up relying solely on each other for support.

As the siblings mature, their bond deepens, and they build a modest life through hard work and mutual care. The narrative follows their intertwined personal journeys, particularly their developing romantic relationships—Bela with Mohan, and Ramu with Malti. Their lives are disrupted when Ramu loses his job, creating financial strain and emotional uncertainty for both siblings.

Despite these hardships, the family’s challenges are gradually resolved, and the film concludes with the union of the two couples, reaffirming the enduring strength of Ramu and Bela’s relationship.

== Cast ==
- Sujit Kumar as Ramu
- Padma Khanna as Bela, Ramu’s sister
- Rakesh Pandey as Mohan, Bela’s love interest
- Gauri Khurana, as Malti, Ramu’s love interest
- Shri Gopal
- Paintal

== Music ==
The music was composed by Chitragupt and lyrics for all songs written by Laxman Shahabadi.

No.	Title	Singer(s)	Length
1.	"Kahanva Gail Ledkaeeyan Ho"	Alka Yagnik	3:59
2.	"Lagate Solhavan Achha Bhail"	Asha Bhosle	4:02
3.	"Yaad Rakhiha Hamri Piritiya"	Alka Yagnik, Udit Narayan	4:37
4.	"Sasuriya Jaeeha Bhaiya"	Alka Yagnik	6:06
5.	"Apni Chhodi Se Kar Da Biyaah"	Suresh Wadkar	4:35
6.	"Doliya Utha Ke"	Mahendra Kapoor	4:55
7.	"Ratan Bhaiyake Lali Ghodi"	Alka Yagnik	6:32

== Bibliography ==
- Ghosh, Avijit (2010). CINEMA BHOJPURI. Penguin Books Limited (published 22 May 2010). ISBN 9788184752564.
