= Chetna =

- Theatrical release poster
- Directed by: B.R. Ishara
- Written by: B.R. Ishara
- Produced by: I.M. Kunnu
- Starring: Shatrughan Sinha; Anil Dhawan; Rehana Sultan
- Edited by: Anil Choudhary
- Music by: Sapan Jagmohan
- Distributed by: S. V
- Release date: 4 December 1970
- Running time: 145 minutes
- Country: India
- Language: Hindi

Chetna (transl. Awareness) is a 1970 Bollywood erotic drama film directed by B.R. Ishara. The film stars Shatrughan Sinha, Anil Dhawan and Rehana Sultan. The film focuses on the subject of rehabilitation of prostitutes. However, the film is more famous for its bold scenes of the actress Rehana Sultan. The film virtually ended her film career as she was typecast thereafter.

One of its songs, "Main To Har Mod Par Tujhko Doonga Sada," is singer Mukesh's all-time memorable and popular song.

== Plot ==
Anil is shy and reclusive and is introduced to a beautiful prostitute named Seema through his friend, Ramesh. Anil and Seema become good friends through their increasing patience, acceptance, and understanding of each other's ways. They eventually fall in love.

One day, Anil proposes to Seema, and although Seema is happy about this, she's very reluctant in taking the decision to proceed with him because she's not sure whether she can lead a normal life after marriage. Still, she accepts the proposal, and Anil offers her to stay with him for some time before she marries him. Seema becomes convinced that Anil truly loves her, and that she can actually lead a normal life with him. She starts to plan for her marriage, and, during that time, a matter comes up in which Anil has to go out of town for a few days.

When he returns, he returns to an unrecognizable Seema. Seema takes up drinking, smoking, and develops a very nonchalant and distant attitude towards him. He wonders what might have happened to her during his absence. Unbeknownst to him, Seema discovers that she is pregnant and she doesn't know who the father is. Not wanting Anil to be ridiculed and cursed by society, she poisons herself.

== Cast ==
- Anil Dhawan as Anil
- Shatrughan Sinha as Ramesh
- Rehana Sultan as Seema
- Nadira as Nirmala
- Laxmi Chhaya
- Asit Sen
- Manmohan Krishna as Dr. Mehra
- Johnny Whisky
- Master Amir

== Music ==
The musical score for the film was composed by Sapan-Jagmohan. The lyrics were written by Naqsh Lyallpuri.

Song	Singer
"Main To Har Mod Par"	Mukesh
"Main To Har Mod Par" (Sad)	Mukesh
"Jeevan Hai Ek Bhool"	Suman Kalyanpur
