= Ek Hi Raasta (1977 film) =

- Theatrical release poster
- Directed by: Mohan Segal
- Written by: Ali Raza (dialogues); Verma Malik (lyrics)
- Screenplay by: Nabendu Ghosh
- Story by: Subodh Ghosh
- Produced by: Mohan Segal
- Starring: Jeetendra; Shabana Azmi; Asha Sachdev; Vinod Mehra
- Cinematography: Kamalakar Rao
- Edited by: R. Dabholkar
- Music by: Rajesh Roshan
- Production company: Uma Cine Films Pvt Ltd
- Release date: 8 June 1977
- Running time: 140 minutes
- Country: India
- Language: Hindi

Ek Hi Raasta (transl. Only One Way) is a 1977 Hindi-language drama film, produced and directed by Mohan Segal under the Uma Cine Films Pvt Ltd banner. It stars Jeetendra, and Shabana Azmi, and the music is composed by Rajesh Roshan.

== Cast ==
- Jeetendra
- Shabana Azmi
- Vinod Mehra
- Asha Sachdev
- Utpal Dutt
- Om Shivpuri
- Jagdeep
- Indrani Mukherjee
- Master Inderjeet

== Soundtrack ==
| # | Song | Singer |
|---|---|---|
| 1 | "Jis Kaam Ko Dono" | Kishore Kumar, Asha Bhosle |
| 2 | "Bin Saathi Ke Jeevan Kya Hai" | Kishore Kumar, Anuradha Paudwal |
| 3 | "Tumse Nahin Pehchaan Meri" | Mohammed Rafi |
| 4 | "Oh Ho Dheere Dheere" | Lata Mangeshkar |
| 5 | "Dil Ko Mila Lo" | Asha Bhosle, Amit Kumar |
