= Piya Ka Ghar =

- Directed by: Basu Chatterjee
- Screenplay by: Ram Kelkar; Jainendra Jain
- Story by: Vasant P. Kale
- Based on: Mumbaicha Jawai (Marathi Film)
- Produced by: Tarachand Barjatya
- Starring: Jaya Bhaduri; Anil Dhawan; Paintal
- Cinematography: K. K. Mahajan
- Edited by: Mukhtar Ahmed
- Music by: Laxmikant Pyarelal
- Production company: Rajshri Productions
- Distributed by: Rajshri Productions
- Release date: 25 February 1972
- Running time: 135 minutes
- Country: India
- Language: Hindi

Piya Ka Ghar (transl. My Beloved's House) is a 1972 Indian Hindi-language romantic comedy film directed by Basu Chatterjee, and produced by Rajshri Productions, starring Anil Dhawan and Jaya Bhaduri. A remake of Raja Thakur's Marathi film Mumbaicha Jawai, it portrays the difficulties of life in Mumbai during the 1970s in the form of a comic family drama. According to film and music expert Rajesh Subramanian, Amol Palekar was the first choice for the lead role, but an unfortunate misunderstanding led to Chatterjee casting Anil Dhawan.

== Plot ==
The two main characters are Ram and Malti. Ram lives in a chawl (tenement) in Mumbai. Malti initially lives in a relatively comfortable home in an unidentified village.

Ram and Malti are hooked up through a matchmaker that their parents have hired. The matchmaker first visits Malti's house, then he then visits Ram and his family (parents, two brothers, one sister-in-law, three uncles, and two aunts), who live together in a one-room apartment.

Ram and Malti fall in love, and Ram's family visits her in her village. Soon, they are married, and Malti moves to Ram's apartment, not knowing what to expect. Since there is very little room left in the apartment, the newlyweds are forced to sleep in the kitchen. They make several comical, but failed, attempts to have some privacy.

At last, Malti can bear it no longer, and her uncle arrives to take her back to the village. But when they see all her in-laws offering to move out on her account, they change their minds, saying that such love overcomes the difficulties of living in Mumbai. In the end, the couple finally finds the privacy they were seeking.

== Cast ==
Actor/Actress	Character/Role	Notes
Jaya Bhaduri	Malti Shankar	
Anil Dhawan	Ram G. Sharma	
Agha	Girdharilal Sharma	
Sulochana Chatterjee	Mrs. Girdharilal Sharma	
Suresh Chatwal	Shiri G. Sharma	
Rajeeta Thakur	Shobha Shiri Sharma	as Rajeeta Thakur
Raja Paranjpe	Gauri Shankar	as Raja Paranjape
Keshto Mukherjee	Baburao Kulkarni	as Kesto Mukherjee
Mukri	Kanhaiya	
Sunder	Irate Passenger	
Paintal	Arun	
C.S. Dubey	Pandit	
Asrani		
Sarita Devi		
Samar Chatterjee		
Manmauji		
Prakash Mishra		
Pardesi		
Rajan Verma		as Raj Verma
Alka		
Amitabh Bachchan		Guest Appearance
Dharmendra	Himself	

== Soundtrack ==
The following songs, listed in the order in which they appear. Lyrics are penned by Anand Bakshi and music is composed by Laxmikant Pyarelal. The song "Ye Jeevan Hai" sung by Kishore Kumar was frequently used in 2022 movie Uunchai in background as a part of the story plot.

- "Ye Jeevan Hai" by Kishore Kumar
- "Bambaee Shahar Kee" by Kishore Kumar
- "Piya Ka Ghar" by Lata Mangeshkar
- "Ye Zulf Kaisee Hai" by Mohammed Rafi and Lata Mangeshkar
