= Tiger (1979 film) =

1979 Telugu film

- Theatrical release poster
- Directed by: Nandamuri Ramesh
- Written by: Vidwan Kanwasri; D. Prabhakar (dialogues)
- Screenplay by: P. Gangadhara Rao
- Story by: Rakesh Kumar
- Based on: Khoon Pasina
- Produced by: Parvathaneni Narayana Rao
- Starring: N. T. Rama Rao; Rajinikanth; Radha Saluja; Subhashini
- Cinematography: S. S. Lal
- Edited by: S. P. S. Veerappa
- Music by: Satyam
- Production company: Nava Shakthi Films
- Release date: 5 September 1979
- Running time: 149 mins
- Country: India
- Language: Telugu

Tiger is a 1979 Indian Telugu-language action film, produced by Parvathaneni Narayana Rao and directed by Nandamuri Ramesh. The film stars N. T. Rama Rao, Rajinikanth, Radha Saluja and Subhashini, with music composed by Satyam. It was also Rajinikanth's 50th film as an actor. The film is a remake of the Hindi film Khoon Pasina (1977).

== Cast ==
- N. T. Rama Rao as Tiger Raja
- Rajinikanth as Rashid
- Radha Saluja as Rekha
- Subhashini as Shanti
- Satyanarayana as Kotinagulu / Zamindar Jagannatham
- Gummadi as Master
- Allu Ramalingaiah as Ramadasu
- Prabhakar Reddy as Ranga
- Anjali Devi as Fathima Begum
- Annapoorna as Rukmini
- Jaya Malini as item number
- Chalapathi Rao as I.G.
- Sakshi Ranga Rao
- Vankayala as Bheemaiah
- Balakrishna as Bullabbai
- Saradhi

== Soundtrack ==
Tiger

Film score by Satyam
- Released: 1979
- Genre: Soundtrack
- Length: 25:18
- Producer: Satyam

Satyam chronology
Iddaru Asadhyule (1979)	Tiger (1979)	Viyyala Vari Kayyalu (1979)

Music composed by Satyam.

No.	Title	Lyrics	Singer(s)	Length
1.	"Aha Anthaa Choosaanu"	C. Narayana Reddy	S. P. Balasubrahmanyam, P. Susheela	3:25
2.	"Chesukunna Vaallaku"	C. Narayana Reddy	S. P. Balasubrahmanyam	3:22
3.	"Em Debba Theesaavu"	C. Narayana Reddy	S. P. Balasubrahmanyam, P. Susheela	3:23
4.	"Kshanam Kshanam"	C. Narayana Reddy	S. P. Balasubrahmanyam, S. Janaki	4:56
5.	"Maarindhi Kaalam"	C. Narayana Reddy	S. P. Balasubrahmanyam, P. Susheela	3:21
6.	"Okati Rendu Moodu"	Veturi	S. P. Balasubrahmanyam, P. Susheela	3:25
7.	"Ye Thalli Kannadhiraa""	Veturi	P. Susheela	3:26
