= Kaya Palat =

- Directed by: Satyen Bose
- Written by: Satyen Bose
- Produced by: Children's Film Society India
- Starring: Ashok Kumar; Suresh Chatwal; Anoop Kumar; Tun Tun
- Cinematography: Anil Mitra
- Edited by: Mukhtar Ahmed
- Music by: Alok Ganguly
- Distributed by: Children's Film Society India
- Release date: 13 October 1983
- Running time: 144 minutes
- Country: India
- Language: Hindi

Kaya Palat is a1983 Indian Hindi-language sci-Fi thriller film directed by Satyen Bose. The film stars Suresh Chatwal, Anoop Kumar, Tun Tun, and Rajendra Nath. The rights to this film are owned by Children's Film Society India.

== Plot ==
A brilliant post graduate scientist, Dr. Aravind Rai who is trying to invent a formula to make humans faster, Fellow scientist Kalicharan is jealous of him.

== Cast ==
- Rajendra Nath as Kalicharan
- Jankidas as Professor
- Anoop Kumar as Police Inspector
- Suresh Chatwal as Scientist Aravind Rai
- Shyam
- Birbal
- Praveen Paul
- Kalpana
- Meenakshi Anand
- Ashok Kumar
- Mastar Vikas Khanna as Young Aravind
- Asha sharma
- Master Ravi Valecha
