= Do Raha =

- Poster
- Directed by: Firoze Chinoy
- Starring: Anil Dhawan; Radha Saluja; Shatrughan Sinha
- Music by: Sapan-Jagmohan
- Release date: 21 November 1971
- Country: India
- Language: Hindi

Do Raha (transl. Two Paths) is a 1971 Hindi-language erotic drama film. The film stars Anil Dhawan, Radha Saluja, Shatrughan Sinha.

The film was remade in Tamil as Aval (1972).

== Cast ==
- Anil Dhawan as Ravindra Kumar Bharti
- Radha Saluja as Geeta
- Shatrughan Sinha (Special Appearance)
- Iftekhar as Thakur
- Roopesh Kumar as Naveen
- Rakesh Pandey
- Dinesh Hingoo as Banwari
- Leela Mishra as Laxmi

== Music ==
All songs were written by Indeevar.

| Song | Singer |
|---|---|
| "Tumhi Rehnuma Ho" | Asha Bhosle |
| "Dole Jhumka Mera" | Asha Bhosle |
| "Meri Bagiya Ki Kali" | Asha Bhosle |
