= Aakhri Mujra =

1981 film by Hiren Nag

- Directed by: Hiren Nag
- Produced by: Lallan
- Starring: Asha Parekh; Zarina Wahab; Nadira; Ajit; Jagdeep
- Release date: 1981
- Country: India
- Language: Hindi

Aakhri Mujra is a 1981 Bollywood drama film directed by Hiren Nag and starring Asha Parekh, Zarina Wahab, Nadira, Ajit, Jagdeep and Shreeram Lagoo.

== Cast ==
- Asha Parekh as Shamshaad
- Vikram Makandar as Gulzar
- Zarina Wahab as Sitara
- Ajit Khan as Harnam
- Jagdeep as Bankelal
- Nadira as Panna Baai
- Shreeram Lagoo as Anand Narayan
- Mukri as Shambhu Prasad

== Soundtrack ==
Song	Singer
"Tumhare Khwab Sajane"	Lata Mangeshkar
"Tum Mere Koi Nahin"	Asha Bhosle
"Nindiya Mori Nindiya"	Asha Bhosle
"Mori Nathani Jhoome Re"	Asha Bhosle
"Thake Huye Hai Nizaam"	Praful Jhaveri
"Yeh Woh Hai Jinka Ghar"	Praful Jhaveri
"Yeh Apni Zinda Laash Ko"	Praful Jhaveri
