= B. R. Ishara =

Indian film director and screenwriter

- Born: Roshan Lal Sharma; 7 September 1934; Bharwain, Chintpurni, Una, Himachal Pradesh, India
- Died: 25 July 2012 (aged 77); Mumbai, Maharashtra, India
- Years active: 1964-1996
- Spouse: Rehana Sultan

Babu Ram Ishara (born Roshan Lal Sharma 7 September 1934 – 25 July 2012) was an Indian film director and screenwriter best known for his films of the 1970s. He filmed 35 Bollywood films between 1964 and 1996. He was much popular for his film Chetana, Log Kya Kahenge, Milap, Man Jaiye, Ghar Ki Laaj, Woh Phir Aayegi and Sautela Bhai.

== Life and career ==
Ishara was born in Bharwain (Chintpurni), in the Una district, Himachal Pradesh in India. After leaving home to try his luck in Bombay, he became a film director.

His first mainstream film, Insaaf Ka Mandir, starred the actors Tarun Bose and Aruna Irani. Subsequently, he brought cricketer Salim Durrani into cinema with Charitra in which he also introduced Parveen Babi and composer Bappi Lahiri to film audiences. He worked with a number of other newcomers including Danny Dengzongpa, Rakesh Pandey, Vijay Arora, Jaya Bhaduri, Amitabh Bachchan, Reena Roy, Shatrughan Sinha, Raj Kiran and Raza Murad. His film Woh Phir Ayegi with Rajesh Khanna in 1988 was a silver jubilee hit and Sautela Bhai was critically acclaimed.

He got married in 1984 to the Bollywood actress Rehana Sultan.

Ishara died from tuberculosis on 24 July 2012 at 1:30 am in Mumbai's Criticare hospital at age 77.

== Filmography ==
=== Director ===
| SR No | Year | Film | Notes |
|---|---|---|---|
| 1 | 1964 | Awara Badal | |
| 2 | 1969 | Insaaf Ka Mandir | Story writer |
| 3 | 1970 | Gunah Aur Kanoon | |
| 4 | 1970 | Chetna | |
| 5 | 1971 | Man Tera Tan Mera | |
| 6 | 1972 | Man Jaiye | |
| 7 | 1972 | Ek Nazar | |
| 8 | 1972 | Zaroorat | |
| 9 | 1972 | Milap | |
| 10 | 1973 | Nai Duniya Naye Log | |
| 11 | 1973 | Haathi Ke Daant | |
| 12 | 1973 | Ek Nao Do Kinare | |
| 13 | 1973 | Dil Ki Rahen | |
| 14 | 1973 | Charitra | |
| 15 | 1974 | Prem Shastra | |
| 16 | 1974 | Dawat | |
| 17 | 1974 | Bazaar Band Karo | |
| 18 | 1975 | Kaagaz Ki Nao | |
| 19 | 1978 | Rahu Ketu | |
| 20 | 1978 | Pal Do Pal Ka Saath | |
| 21 | 1979 | Ghar Ki Laaj | |
| 22 | 1981 | Khara Khota | |
| 23 | 1981 | Kaaran | |
| 24 | 1982 | Log Kya Kahenge | |
| 25 | 1983 | Jai Baba Amarnath | |
| 26 | 1984 | Aurat Ka Inteqam | |
| 27 | 1984 | Hum Do Hamare Do | as B. Aar. Ishara |
| 28 | 1985 | Sautela Pati | |
| 29 | 1986 | Aurat | |
| 30 | 1987 | Besahara | |
| 31 | 1988 | Woh Phir Aayegi | |
| 32 | 1988 | Sila | |
| 33 | 1994 | Janam Se Pehle | |
| 34 | 1996 | Sautela Bhai | |
| 35 | 1996 | Hukumnama | |
