= Sautela Bhai =

1996 Indian Hindi film directed by B. R. Ishara

- Promotional Poster
- Directed by: B. R. Ishara
- Written by: B. R. Ishara
- Produced by: Satish Khanna
- Starring: Rajesh Khanna; Raj Babbar; Kumar Gaurav; Farah; Moon Moon Sen; Deepti Naval
- Music by: R. D. Burman
- Release date: 21 June 1996
- Country: India
- Language: Hindi

Sautela Bhai (transl. Stepbrother) is a 1996 Indian Hindi-language film directed by B. R. Ishara, starring Rajesh Khanna, Raj Babbar, Kumar Gaurav in lead roles. The film was a delayed release in 1996 and a big flop. It is a remake of an old popular movie Dharti Kahe Pukar Ke.

== Cast ==
- Rajesh Khanna as Master Tulsiram
- Raj Babbar as Advocate Rajaram
- Kumar Gaurav as Shankar
- Farah as Bindiya
- Moon Moon Sen as Sheena
- Deepti Naval as Saraswati
- Ranjeet as Rehman
- Amjad Khan as Thakur Narayandas
- Raja Bundela as Gopal
- A. K. Hangal as Bindiya's Maternal Grandfather
- Satyendra Kapoor as Advocate Surendranath

== Soundtrack ==
All tracks were penned by Majrooh Sultanpuri.

Song	Singer
"Main Nahin Aati"	Alka Yagnik
"Jeeyo Jeeyo"	Amit Kumar
"Sajan Sajan"	Asha Bhosle
"Chahe Poochh Lo"	Asha Bhosle, Babla Mehta
