= Kunwara Badan =

- Directed by: Vimal Tiwari
- Written by: Suryaroy Vijh
- Cinematography: K. K. Mahajan
- Music by: Ghanshyam; Rajendra Krishan (lyrics)
- Distributed by: Tulsi Films
- Release date: 1973
- Country: India
- Language: Hindi

Kunwara Badan is a 1973 Bollywood drama film directed by Vimal Tiwari. The music was composed by Ghanashyam and the songs were written by Rajendra Krishan.

== Cast ==
- Madhu Chanda
- Paintal
- Rakesh Pandey
- Surendra
- Suresh Chatwal

== Songs ==
1. "Kal Ki Na Soch" – Asha Bhosle
2. "Haatho Me Mehndi Rachai Jayegi" – Asha Bhosle
3. "Apni Khushi Se Apna Hi Dil Todhna Pada" – Lata Mangeshkar
4. "Kuchh Bhuli Huyi Yaade" – Kishore Kumar
