= Dil Ki Rahen =

- Directed by: B.R. Ishara
- Produced by: Syed Kausar Hussain (Allahabad)
- Starring: Rakesh Pandey and Rehana Sultan
- Music by: Madan Mohan
- Release date: 1973
- Country: India
- Language: Hindi

Dil Ki Rahen is a 1973 Bollywood drama film directed by B.R. Ishara. The music was composed by Madan Mohan and the lyrics were by Naqsh Lailpuri. The film stars Rakesh Pandey and Rehana Sultan.

== Story ==
Rehana Sultan is a doctor who lives with her mother. Her father has died, and while dying, he had instructed her to always obey her mother. Rakesh Pandey (known throughout the movie only as Saheb) has moved into the house opposite to her with a driver and a cook. The driver informs Rehana that he never stays in a house for more than 7 days.

On the day he is supposed to move, he falls ill after drinking too much. Rehana is called for help. The next day, the driver informs her that his Saheb is waiting to give her the fees before moving out. She refuses to take the fees till he is completely alright and informs him that he has to stay there at least for a week. Rehana makes Rakesh promise that he would not drink.

Slowly Rehana and Rakesh develop feelings for each other after Rehana asks him to teach music in lieu of fees.

Rehana's mother asks her to stop seeing Rakesh. But after hearing Rakesh play his sitar, Rehana is unable to stop herself from meeting him.

Rehana's mother informs her that Rakesh is already married. But Rakesh explains to her that though he was married his wife smoked, drank and ran off with another man which caused him to become a drunkard in the first place.

Rehana's mother then asks him to change his religion but Rakesh refuses saying that every human being's first religion is only humanity.

Rehana's mother is in conundrum as to what to do. She suffers a heart attack when Rehana and Rakesh are out. When Rehana come running to meet her, her mother says that a human being who cannot be true to his religion cannot be true to his wife. In this indirect way, she gives her blessing to their marriage and dies.

== Cast ==
- Rakesh Pandey
- Rehana Sultan
- Sulochana
- Dilip Dutt
- Johnny Whisky
- Amrit Lakhanpal

== Songs ==
1. "Rasm E Ulfat Ko Nibhaaen To Nibhaaen Kaise" - Lata Mangeshkar
2. "Aapki Baate Kare Ya Apna Afsaana Kahe" - Lata Mangeshkar
3. "Sharab Ka Sahara" - Manna Dey
4. "Apne Suro Me Mere Suro Ko Basa Lo Ye Geet Amar Ho Jaaye" - Usha Mangeshkar, Manna Dey
5. "Raag Maala" - Manna Dey

The song "Rasm E Ulfat Ko Nibhaaen To Nibhaaen Kaise" is set in raga Madhuvanti.
