= Honeymoon (1973 film) =

- Directed by: Hiren Nag
- Produced by: Tarachand Barjatya
- Starring: Leena Chandavarkar; Anil Dhawan
- Music by: Usha Khanna; Yogesh (lyrics)
- Production company: Rajshri Productions
- Release date: 20 February 1973
- Country: India
- Language: Hindi

Honeymoon is a 1973 Bollywood comedy film directed by Hiren Nag. The film stars Leena Chandavarkar and Anil Dhawan in lead roles.

== Plot ==
Two close friends, Neelu and Madhu, agree that men cannot be trusted, and as such decide to dump their current boyfriends, and marry someone else who meets with the approval of their parents. Shortly thereafter, Madhu is introduced to Chandrakant, whom she likes, and soon both are married. On their honeymoon, she meets with Neelu, who has married Deepak, also her parents' choice. Both are delighted to see other, and cannot wait to meet the others' spouse, little realizing the shock they will get when they do so.

== Music ==
Song	Singer
"Mere Pyase Man Ki Bahar, Kab Se Tha Tumhara Intezar"	Kishore Kumar, Asha Bhosle
"Jeevan Hai Ek Sapna, Madhur Suhana Sapna"	Kishore Kumar, Asha Bhosle
"Do Dil Mile, Gul-O-Gunche Khile, Mere Yaar"	Kishore Kumar, Asha Bhosle
"O Saathi O Saathi"	Mohammed Rafi

== Cast ==
- Anil Dhawan as Chandrakant
- Leena Chandavarkar as Madhu
- Nazima as Neelima "Neelu"
- Suresh Chatwal as Deepak
- Utpal Dutt as Advocate Neeraj Chaudhary
- Shyama as Laxmi Chaudhary
- Mukri as Ram Singh
- Sunder as Madhu's Uncle
- Leela Mishra as Madhu's Aunty
- Jalal Agha
- Purnima as Madhu's Mother
- Agha as Ramakant
- Ruby Mayer as Mrs. Patterson
- Shammi as Mrs. Ramakant
