= Ghulam Begam Badshah =

- Directed by: Jambu
- Produced by: Govindram Ahuja; Sudesh Kumar
- Starring: Shatrughan Sinha; Anil Dhawan; Moushumi Chatterjee
- Music by: Kalyanji-Anandji
- Release date: 17 October 1973
- Country: India
- Language: Hindi

Ghulam Begam Badshah is a 1973 Indian Hindi-language drama film directed by Jambu. The film stars Shatrughan Sinha, Moushumi Chatterjee and Anil Dhawan. The film was a remake of Tamil film Soodhattam.

== Plot ==
The story revolves with two close friend Pratap and Gopal.

== Cast ==
- Shatrughan Sinha as Thakur Pratap
- Anil Dhawan as Thakur Gopal
- Moushumi Chatterjee as Laxmi
- Sudesh Kumar as Shyam
- David as Thakur Balwant
- Pinchoo Kapoor as Thakur Ranjeet
- Sunder as Hanuman
- Randhir as Munimji
- Jagdeep as Harbhajan
- Meena T. as Harbhajan's Wife
- Jagdish Raj as Card Player
- Leena Das as Dancer
- Kumud Chuggani as Kesar

== Songs ==
All songs were penned by Rajendra Krishan.

Song	Singer
"Ghodi Pe Hoke Sawar"	Mohammed Rafi
"Chor Chori Se Jaye"	Lata Mangeshkar
"Raste Raste Janewali, Lehrake Lat Kali Kali"	Kishore Kumar, Asha Bhosle
"Kaahe Ko Kali Se Main"	Asha Bhonsle

== Reception ==
A critic from The States said that "Stars & Studios Ghulam, Begam, Badshah, is unconvincing as the title suggests".
