= Milap (1972 film) =

- Directed by: B. R. Ishara
- Starring: Shatrughan Sinha; Reena Roy; Danny Denzongpa
- Music by: Brij Bhushan, Lyrics Naqsh Lyallpuri
- Release date: September 12, 1972
- Running time: 111 minutes
- Country: India
- Language: Hindi

Milap is a 1972 Bollywood action film directed by B. R. Ishara. The film stars Shatrughan Sinha, Reena Roy and Danny Denzongpa.

== Cast ==
- Shatrughan Sinha as Ravi / Raju
- Reena Roy as Rani Chalava / Rukmani
- Danny Denzongpa as Raju
- Manmohan Krishna as Judge
- Fazlu as Raghunath
- Sarita as Radha

== Soundtrack ==
Song	Singer	Raga
"Kayi Sadiyon Se" (Fast)	Mukesh	Shivaranjani
"Kayi Sadiyon Se" (Slow)	Mukesh	Shivaranjani
"Kahin Aisa Na Ho"	Mohammed Rafi	
"Bajariya Ke Beech"	Asha Bhosle	
"Kehne Ka Raaz Hai"	Asha Bhosle	

== Music ==
The film has a popular song "Kai Sadiyon Se, Kai Janmo Se" sung by Mukesh.
