= Hiren Nag =

Indian film director

Hiren Naag
- Occupation: Film director

Hiren Naag is a former Bollywood director of Hindi films who is best known for his association with Tarachand Barjatya of Rajshri Productions for which he directed hit film Geet Gaata Chal (1975), the blockbuster Ankhiyon Ke Jharokhon Se (1978) and Abodh (1984). For latter, Naag is credited for successfully launching the career of Madhuri Dixit.

== Filmography as director ==
- Honeymoon (1973)
- Geet Gaata Chal (1975)
- Ankhiyon Ke Jharokhon Se (1978)
- Abodh (1984)
- Darpan (1985)

Other films

- 1983 Film Hi Film
- 1981 Aakhri Mujra
- 1980 Maan Abhiman
- 1980 Saajan Mere Main Saajan Ki
- 1979 Sunayana
- 1975 Priyo Bandhabi
- 1972 Bigalito Karuna Janhabi Jamuna
- 1972 Andha Atit
- 1967 Jiban Mrityu
- 1965 Thana Theke Aschi (1965 film)
