= Wohi Raat Wohi Awaaz =

- Directed by: Dev Kishan
- Produced by: Vipin Desai
- Starring: Samit Bhanja; Radha Saluja
- Edited by: Hrishikesh Mukherjee
- Music by: Sonik Omi
- Release date: 25 April 1973
- Country: India
- Language: Hindi

Wohi Raat Wohi Awaaz is a 1973 Hindi horror film starring Samit Bhanja and Radha Saluja.

== Music ==
Song	Singer
"Jogiya Mera Thirke Badan Dekh Tujhko Mere Sajan"	Mohammed Rafi, Radha Saluja
"Mera Man Bhatak Raha"	Asha Bhosle
"Sochta Hai Kya"	Asha Bhosle
"Aayi Tose Milne Deewana Dil Leke"	Asha Bhosle, Usha Khanna
