= Radha Saluja =

Indian actress

- Born: Rita Saluja; 15 September 1951 (age 75); Calcutta, West Bengal, India
- Other name: Radha
- Occupation: Actress
- Years active: 1971–2006
- Spouse: Samim Zaidi
- Relatives: Renu Saluja (sister)

Radha Saluja (born 15 September 1951) is an Indian actress who has not only worked in Hindi cinema and Punjabi cinema but also has several Tamil, Bengali, Malayalam, Telugu and Kannada movies to her credit. She was born on 15 September 1951 in Calcutta, West Bengal, India. An alumnus of the Film and Television Institute of India, she is known for her Hindi films like Lakhon Me Ek, Do Raha, Haar Jeet and Ek Mutthi Aasmaan and the two Tamil blockbusters opposite M. G. Ramachandran Indru Pol Endrum Vaazhga and Idhayakkani. In 1975, she also appeared in the breakthrough Punjabi film Morni (1975).

== Career ==
In the early 1970s, she appeared as a female lead in numerous films, like Aaj Ki Taaza Khabar (1973), Dukh Bhanjan Tera Naam (1974) and Man Jeete Jag Jeet, a Sikh religious film in Punjabi opposite Sunil Dutt. She costarred with M. G. Ramachandran in the Tamil films, Idhayakkani (1975) and Indru Pol Endrum Vaazhga (1977), both blockbusters. She acted with N. T. Rama Rao and Rajinikanth in the Telugu film Tiger (1979).

In 1981, she appeared in Sazaye Maut by Vidhu Vinod Chopra, to whom her sister Renu was married. This was the full-length remake of Chopra's own diploma film at FTII, Pune, Murder at Monkey Hill (1976). She starred in the role that Anjali Paigankar had played in the original film.

== Personal life ==
Radha Saluja is the elder sister of well-known film editor Renu Saluja. After a stint in films she moved to Los Angeles, where she married Shamim Zaidi, host of an ethnic radio programme. She has sung with two music groups that performed across US. She took on a job with federal law services working as special interpreter of Asian languages at a Los Angeles court.

== Filmography ==
=== Hindi ===
| Year | Film | Role |
|---|---|---|
| 1969 | Simla Road | Nena |
| 1971 | Do Raha | Geeta |
| 1971 | Lakhon Me Ek | Gauri |
| 1972 | Haar Jeet | Radha |
| 1972 | Manavata | Devi |
| 1972 | Chori Chori | Komal |
| 1972 | Aage Badho | Mehzabin |
| 1973 | Ek Mutthi Aasmaan | Radha |
| 1973 | Chalaak | Monica Kapoor |
| 1973 | Aaj Ki Taaza Khabar | Geeta Mehta |
| 1973 | Wohi Raat Wohi Awaaz | |
| 1974 | Jeevan Sangram | Amba |
| 1974 | Gaal Gulabi Nain Sharabi | |
| 1974 | Vada Tera Vada | Mariya |
| 1976 | Kasam | |
| 1977 | Ali Baba | |
| 1977 | Minoo | Shobha |
| 1977 | Jai Dwarkadheesh | Devi Rukmani |
| 1977 | Abhi To Jee Lein | Rita |
| 1980 | Jaaye To Jaaye Kahan | |
| 1981 | Sazaye Maut | Malika Modi |
| 1981 | Maila Aanchal | Nisha |
| 1983 | Razia Sultan | |
| 2003 | Banana Brothers | Jayshree |

=== Other Languages ===
| Year | Film | Role | Language |
|---|---|---|---|
| 1972 | Jaban | Laxmi | Bengali |
| 1973 | Man Jeete Jag Jeet | Gurmeet | Punjabi |
| 1973 | Sherni | | Punjabi |
| 1974 | Dukh Bhanjan Tera Naam | Rajni | Punjabi |
| 1975 | Morni | | Punjabi |
| 1975 | Mittar Pyare Nu | Kulwant | Punjabi |
| 1975 | Idhayakkani | Lakshmi | Tamil |
| 1977 | Indru Pol Endrum Vaazhga | Menaka | Tamil |
| 1977 | Anugraham | Sharada | Malayalam |
| 1978 | Nenjil Aadum Poo Ondru | | Tamil |
| 1978 | Derani Jethani | | Punjabi |
| 1979 | Neelakadalin Orathile | Jeeva | Tamil |
| 1979 | Tiger | Rekha | Telugu |
| 1979 | Madhura Sangama | Kala & Mala | Kannada |
