= Ek Nari Do Roop =

- Directed by: Madhusudan
- Written by: Madhusudan
- Produced by: S. Shrivastav
- Starring: Shatrughan Sinha; Asha Sachdev; Madan Puri
- Edited by: Kamalkar
- Music by: Ganesh
- Release date: 1973
- Country: India
- Language: Hindi

Ek Nari Do Roop is a 1973 Bollywood crime drama film directed by Madhusudan. The film stars Roopesh Kumar, Nadira and Shatrughan Sinha. The movie has two famous songs; "Tum Samjho To Achha Hai" sung by Kishore Kumar and Asha Bhosle and "Dil Ka Soona Saaz Tarana Dhundega", sung by Mohammed Rafi. The movie is loosely based on the 1959 novel Shock Treatment by James Hadley Chase.

== Cast ==
- Shatrughan Sinha as Vishal
- Rashmi Dhawan as Lalita
- Asha Sachdev as Sujata
- Madan Puri as Belani
- Iftekhar as Dinesh
- Malika as Sameena
- Roopesh Kumar as Ali Ahmed "Pocketmaar"
- Mehmood Junior as Ramu
- Chaman Puri as Petrol Pump Owner

== Songs ==
Song	Singer
"Dil Ka Soona Saaz"	Mohammed Rafi
"Hum Hi Jane Ek Tore"	Mohammed Rafi
"Tum Samjho To Achha Hai, Main Bolun To Kya Bolun"	Kishore Kumar, Asha Bhosle
"Mere Man Pawan Sang"	Asha Bhosle
"Zindagi Mein Sada"	Asha Bhosle
