= Hifazat (1973 film) =

- Directed by: K. S. R. Das
- Starring: Vinod Mehra; Asha Sachdev
- Music by: R. D. Burman
- Release date: 1973
- Country: India
- Language: Hindi

Hifazat is a 1973 Indian Hindi-language drama film directed by K. S. R. Das. The film stars Ashok Kumar, Vinod Mehra, Asha Sachdev, Narendra Nath and Lalita Pawar. The film was not a commercial success but songs are classics even today.

== Cast ==
- Vinod Mehra as Kishore
- Asha Sachdev as Asha
- Ashok Kumar as Judge Ram Prasad – Asha's foster father (special appearance)
- Madan Puri as saw mill owner (special appearance)
- Ranjeet as Ranjeet – Kishore's friend (special appearance)
- Kanhaiyalal as Kishore's father
- Iftekhar as Lala Jamnadas – Asha's real father (special appearance)
- Lalita Pawar as Sewak Singh's mother
- Narendra Nath as Sewak Singh
- Jyothi Lakshmi as Dancer

== Soundtrack ==
All songs are written by Majrooh Sultanpuri and music by R. D. Burman.

Song	Singer
"Jaan-E-Jahan Rootha Na Karo"	Kishore Kumar
"Mere Hamrahi, Mere Pyar"	Asha Bhosle
"Aiya Habbi, Aiya Habbi"	Asha Bhosle
"Yeh Mastani Dagar"	Asha Bhosle
