= Kashmakash (1973 film) =

- LP Vinyl Records Cover
- Directed by: Feroze Chinoy
- Written by: based on James Hadley Chase novel- Tiger By The Tail.
- Produced by: Seeroo Daryanani; Shankar BC for Delux Productions
- Starring: Feroz Khan; Rekha; Shatrughan Sinha; Asha Sachdev
- Music by: Kalyanji-Anandji
- Release date: 26 October 1973
- Running time: 135 minutes
- Country: India
- Language: Hindi
- Budget: est. ₹ 70 lakh (est. ₹ 17.92 crore as of 2019)

Kashmakash is a 1973 Indian Hindi-language film directed by Feroze Chinoy, starring Feroz Khan, Rekha, Shatrughan Sinha, Asha Sachdev, along with Ranjeet, Rehman, I. S. Johar, Padma Khanna. Loosely based on James Hadley Chase's novel Tiger by the Tail.

== Plot ==
Satish Gupta and Seeta are a happily married couple till one day, on the insistence of his friend ManMohan, Satish visits Sapna for an illicit rendezvous at her hotel where she performs as a cabaret artist, and there he sees her in her bathtub, from wherein she leads him to her bed. Before anything can happen, Sapna is ruthlessly murdered in the dark with a knife. Satish rushes out of her room, but is caught red handed on the stairs, by a private detective I. S. Johar, who plays himself in the movie, and who keeps tabs on influential people to nab their illicit dealings to blackmail them. He always carries his pet white Pomeranian dog with him as his signature at the places he investigates along with the police, but unlike the police, he works for the sleazy underworld being run by Rana (Rehman.

The other love angle is of Ritu, Satish's sister, who introduces her beau Inspector Sinha to him on the next morning of the sleazy murder, which makes headlines in all the newspapers, Sapna being known internationally as a performer, which makes things all the more difficult for Satish, whose suit is also splattered with Sapna's blood. I. S. Johar, now with Inspector (Asit Sen), along with CID Inspector Sinha, start keeping tabs on Satish, all for their own motives. The suspense builds up as also the agony of Satish, who due to this misadventure is also unable to perform with his loving wife Seeta, which is the underlying theme of the movie as to how guilt can destroy a marriage.

After a series of debacles, Inspector Sinha decides to collude with Satish on solving the murder mystery along with Seeta, to whom Satish confesses his guilt, and makes them play out the same night as was done on the night of the murder, in the same bed and in the same hotel. Here emerges Johny who was the estranged lover of Sapna, and who is being masterminded by none other than I. S. Johar, who turns out to be under the command of Rana, who in turn is about to marry Johny's sister and stand for elections in a garb of respectability. Before this interlude, Sinha has already come to know the post-mortem Autopsy details of Sapna, which revealed that she was two months pregnant, and after investigation has come to know that Johny was in jail till a day before the murder. I. S. Johar, after removing a picture, Psycho style, enters the room and tries to kill the woman with Satish, thinking of implicating him again, but manages to only stab a pillow. He is caught by the police, but manages to escape. Rana is nailed for conspiracy, but before anything can be done, he is killed in an exchange of gunshots between him and I. S. Johar.

After a chase of cars and kidnapping of Seeta, I. S. Johar is shot by Inspector Sinha, and thus his car lands below a cliff, which kills him. Satish and Seeta are cleared of guilt and Inspector Sinha marries Ritu.

== Cast ==
- Feroz Khan as Satish Gupta
- Rekha as Seeta Gupta
- Shatrughan Sinha as Inspector Sinha
- Asha Sachdev as Ritu Gupta
- Ranjeet as Johny Paul
- Rehman as Rana Chaudhary
- I. S. Johar as I. S. Johar / Tanhai
- Padma Khanna as Sapna
- Ramesh Deo as Manmohan
- Seema Deo as Manmohan's wife
- Zeb Rehman as Lata
- Asit Sen as Inspector Asit Sen
- D. K. Sapru as Police Commissioner

== Music ==
Song	Singer
"Jitna Zaroori Man Ka Milan"	Kishore Kumar
"Kab Se Milan Ki Lagan Lagi"	Lata Mangeshkar
"Kashmakash Chhod De"	Asha Bhosle
"Pyar Tujhe Aisa Karungi"	Asha Bhosle
"Mere Peechhe Hai Deewane, Aage Aage Mastane"	Asha Bhosle, Shatrughan Sinha
