= Bharwain =

Bharwain Bharwain
- Hill station
- Location in Himachal Pradesh, India Bharwain (India)
- Coordinates: 31.798229°N 76.124525°E
- Country: India
- State: Himachal Pradesh
- District: Una
- Elevation: 1,000 m (3,300 ft)
- Time zone: UTC+5:30 (IST)
- PIN: 177109
- Telephone code: 911976
- Vehicle registration: HP

Bharwain is a hill station situated in Amb tehsil and hill hamlet village in Chintpurni region in the Una district of Himachal Pradesh, India. It is an entry point to the Chintpurni Temple. The area is situated between the western Himalayas in the north and the Shiwalik (or Shivalik) range bordering the state of Punjab.

== Description ==
Bharwain is situated at a distance of about 2 km from the Chintpurni Shakta pitha temple on the Hoshiarpur-Dharamshala highway. Bharwain is an administrative seat as well, as it is a sub-tehsil under the Amb block. Bharwain is also a PWD circle that covers many blocks of the Una district. This place borders the Kangra district to the north. While the region has nice climate year round, the best time to visit is August until the end of March.

== Attractions ==
=== Temples ===
- Chintpurni temple

== Location ==
Bharwain is situated at the altitude of around 1000 meters and is part of the Una district, Himachal Pradesh. It is located on the Hoshiarpur-Dharamashala road. This road is part of the State Highway network.

In general, temperatures in Bharwain, Chintpurni are about 5–8 °C (41–46 °F) lower than in the Punjab and Haryana plains and in Delhi.
