= Haathi Ke Daant =

- Directed by: B.R.Ishara
- Starring: Asit Sen; Iftekhar; Rakesh Pandey
- Music by: Ravindra Jain
- Release date: 19 September 1973
- Country: India
- Language: Hindi

Haathi Ke Daant is a 1973 Bollywood drama film directed by B.R.Ishara. The film stars Rakesh Pandey, Asit Sen and Iftekhar in lead roles.

== Cast ==
- Asit Sen
- Iftekhar
- Rakesh Pandey
- Dilip Dutt
- Rajdeep Monhmohan

== Soundtrack ==
The music of the film was composed by Ravindra Jain. Lyricist information as per below.

1. "Chal Chal Kahi Door Jaha" – Suman Kalyanpur, Lyrics Kapil Kumar
2. "Man Ka Mere Tan Ka Mere" – Asha Bhosle, Lyrics Kapil Kumar
