= Rakesh Pandey (actor) =

Indian actor (1940–2025)

- Born: 9 April 1940; Ambala, East Punjab, India
- Died: 21 March 2025 (aged 84); Mumbai, Maharashtra, India
- Education: Indian Film and Television Institute
- Occupation: Actor
- Years active: 1969–2023

Rakesh Pandey (9 April 1940 – 21 March 2025) was an Indian actor in Hindi and Bhojpuri films. He appeared in TV serials such as Chotti Bahu and Dehleez. He was an alumnus of the Indian Film and Television Institute, Pune.

== Life and career ==
Born in Ambala East Punjab, Rakesh graduated from Shamsher High School Nahan in 1961. He was a graduate of Bhartendu Academy of Dramatic Arts. In 1966, he left the Indian Film and Television Institute and joined the IPTA. His film debut came in 1969 in Sara Akash, based on the novel by Rajendra Yadav, and directed by Basu Chatterjee. He was awarded the President's Award. As a Bhojpuri actor, he received the fourth Bhojpuri Film Award for Lifetime Achievement. He acted in the first Bhojpuri TV serial Sanchi Piritia.

== Death ==
Rakesh Pandey died from a cardiac arrest on 21 March 2025, at the age of 84. He died at 8:50 AM at Arogya Nidhi Hospital, Juhu, Mumbai.

== Filmography ==
=== Films ===
- The Rise of Sudarshan Chakra (2023) as Dada ji
- Malik Ek (2010) as Collector Sahib
- Staying Alive (2007) as Pandey
- Indian (2001)... Raw Chief
- Dil Chahta Hai (2001)
- Hasina Dacait (2001)
- Champion (2000) as Mukhtar Ahmed
- Brij Kau Birju (1999) Brajbhasha dialect
- Sar Kati Laash (1999)
- Bhishma (1996)
- Taqdeerwala (1995) as Suraj's dad
- Beta Ho To Aisa (1994)
- Gopalaa (1994)
- Santaan (1993) Defence Lawyer
- Pyar Ka Taraana (1993)
- Adharm (1992) as Bharat Verma
- Mehboob Mere Mehboob (1992) as Ranjha's brother
- Eeshwar (1989)
- Chintamani Surdas (1988)
- Jawani Ki Lahren (1988)
- 108 Teerthyatra (1987) as Rajkumar Uttam Kumar
- Zevar (1987) as Gagan
- Yudh (1985) as Rahim
- Bhaiya Dooj (1984) as Mohan
- Chandani Bani Chudel (1984)
- Maya Bazaar (1984/II) as Shri Krishna
- Paanchwin Manzil (1983)
- Apradhi Kaun? (1982)
- Sant Gyaneshwar (1982)
- Mahabali Hanuman (1981) as Shri Ram
- Nai Imarat (1981)
- Dharti Maiyaan (1981)
- Saiyan Tore Karan (1981)
- Abdullah (1980) as Yashoda's husband
- Gori Dian Jhanjran (1980) as Choudhary
- Manzil (1979) as Prakash Mariwalla
- Balam Pardesia (1979)
- Mera Rakshak (1978) as Mangal
- Darwaza (1978)
- Toote Khilone (1978)
- Yehi Hai Zindagi (1977)
- Zindagi (1976) as Ramesh R. Shukla
- Aarambh (1976)
- Jeevan Jyoti (1976) as Harbhans
- Andolan (1975)
- Apne Dushman (1975) as Singh
- Himalay Se Ooncha (1975) as Captain George
- Mutthi Bhar Chawal (1975)
- Zindagi Aur Toofan (1975)
- Ek Gaon ki Kahani (1975)
- Do Chattane (1974) as Ramzan
- Shatranj Ke Mohre (1974)
- Shikwa (1974)
- Ujala Hi Ujala (1974) as Ajit
- Woh Main Nahin (1974)
- Dil Ki Rahen (1973)
- Haathi Ke Daant (1973)
- Intezaar (1973)
- Kunwara Badan (1973)
- Amar Prem (1972) as Anand Babu's Brother-in-law
- Anokha Daan (1972)
- Man Jaiye (1972) as Ajay Sharma
- Rakhwala (1971) (as Rakesh Panday) as Suresh
- Do Raha (1971)
- Sara Akash (1969) (as Rakesh) as Samar Thakur

=== Serials ===
- Jaat Ki Jugni (2017) as Khazan Singh Dahiya
- Dehleez (2009)
- Chotti Bahu (2008)
- Aek Chabhi Hai Padoss Mein (2006)
- Pyaar Ke Do Naam: Ek Raadha, Ek Shyaam (2006) TV series as Brijkishore - Raadha's father
- Devi (2003) TV series
- Shaktimaan (2002) as Pandit Vidhadhar Shastri - Shatimaan's adoptive father
- Piya Binaa (2000) as Ayub Khan's father
- Kahkashan (1991) as Majaz Lucknowi - Urdu poet
- Saans (1999) TV mini-series
- Aakhri Chaal (1985) (TV)
- 2002 Ghar Sansaar as Shashikant
