= Rehana Sultan =

Indian actress

- Born: Rehana Sultan; 19 November 1950 (age 75); Allahabad, Uttar Pradesh, India
- Education: FTII, Pune
- Occupation: Actress
- Years active: 1970–1992
- Spouse: B. R. Ishara
- Awards: National Award (Best Actress) (1971)

Rehana Sultan is an Indian actress best known for her debut role in the acclaimed 1970 film Dastak which won her the National Film Award for Best Actress.

A graduate of Film and Television Institute of India (FTII), Pune, she is also known for another bold role in the film Chetna (1970), which got her typecast thus ending her film career, despite its promising start.

She said "The sex in my films was not forced, but part of the narrative. Today, I feel these scenes are used for commercial reasons. All I can say is Babuda was ahead of his times."

== Biography ==
Rehana Sultan was born on 19 November 1950 and raised in Allahabad in a Baháʼí family, she graduated from high school in 1967, and was selected in the same year to study acting at FTII. After she graduated with a sexy role in Vishwanath Ayengar's diploma film Shadi Ki Pehli Salgirah (1967), she got her break in a feature film in Rajinder Singh Bedi's Dastak (1970), making her the first actress from the Institute to land a lead role in the film industry.

In a 2012 interview to The Telegraph (Calcutta) newspaper, she tried to remove the common public confusion that she was a Muslim. Rehana Sultan, obviously, is a Muslim-sounding name. So she was asked a question by the reporter.

Question: "But for a conservative Muslim girl to do those bold shots in Chetna and Dastak?

Her answer was:

"First of all, the belief that I'm Muslim is wrong. I'm a Bahai. My husband (B. R. Ishara) is a pucca Brahmin".

== Awards ==
She won the National Film Award for her role in the film Dastak (1970). In the same year she also played the lead role in the film Chetna which was shot in 28 days along with the shooting of Dastak. That film was about the rehabilitation of prostitutes, and her role changed the portrayal of sex workers in Hindi cinema.

Her avant-garde roles brought her success but limited her choices in future films. Some of her well known films include Haar Jeet (1972), Prem Parbat (1973) and the political satire Kissa Kursi Ka (1977). Vijay Anand's Hum Rahen Na Rahen (1984) in which she costarred with Shabana Azmi was her last Hindi film in a lead role.

She has also appeared in a Punjabi movie Putt Jattan De (1981) with Shatrughan Sinha.

== Personal life ==
Rehana Sultan married writer-director B. R. Ishara in 1984, who had directed her film Chetna (1970 film). B. R. Ishara passed away in July 2012. Both Ishara and Rehana did not want children so they had none.

== Filmography ==
| Year | Film | Role | Notes |
|---|---|---|---|
| 1970 | Chetna | Seema | Bengal Film Journalists' Association Award for Best Actress (Hindi) |
| 1970 | Dastak | Salma Ahmed | National Film Award for Best Actress |
| 1971 | Padosi | | |
| 1971 | Man Tera Tan Mera | Jyoti | |
| 1972 | Tanhai | | |
| 1972 | Savera | | |
| 1972 | Man Jaiye | Suman | |
| 1972 | Haar Jeet | Kamal | |
| 1973 | Prem Parbat | | |
| 1973 | Dil Ki Rahen | | |
| 1973 | Bada Kabutar | Rita | |
| 1974 | Albeli | | |
| 1974 | Khote Sikkay | Rani / Paro | |
| 1974 | Ek Ladki Badnaam Si | | |
| 1975 | Yeh Sach Hai | | |
| 1975 | Zindagi Aur Toofan | Tara | |
| 1976 | Sajjo Rani | | |
| 1977 | Agent Vinod | Zarina | |
| 1977 | Ooparwala Jaane | | |
| 1978 | Nawab Sahib | | |
| 1978 | Assignment Bombay | | |
| 1979 | Deen Aur Imaan | | |
| 1979 | Aaj Ki Dhara | | |
| 1980 | Sister | | |
| 1980 | Agent 009 | | |
| 1981 | Jwala Daku | Rambhabai | |
| 1982 | Bedard | | |
| 1983 | Putt Jattan De | Jagat Singh's wife | Punjabi |
| 1983 | Bandhan Kuchchey Dhaagon Ka | Advocate Thakur | |
| 1984 | Hum Rahe Na Hum | Kalyani Sharma | Nominated—Filmfare Award for Best Supporting Actress |
| 1985 | Aakhri Chaal | | TV film |
| 1992 | Sooraj Mukhi | Sandhya | |
| 2013 | Inkaar | Maya's mother | |
