= Leela Mishra =

Indian actress

- Born: 1 January 1908; Jais, United Provinces of Agra and Oudh, British India (present-day Uttar Pradesh, India)
- Died: 17 January 1988 (aged 80); Bombay, Maharashtra, India (present-day Mumbai)
- Other name: Leela Misra
- Occupation: actress
- Years active: 1936–1986
- Known for: Mausi in Sholay (1975)
- Spouse: Ram Prasad Misra
- Children: 3

Leela Mishra (1 January 1908 – 17 January 1988) was an Indian actress. She worked as a character actor in over 200 Hindi films for five decades, and is best remembered for playing stock characters such as aunts (Chachi or Mausi). She is best known for her role of "mausi" in the blockbuster Sholay (1975), Dil Se Mile Dil (1978), Baton Baton Mein (1979), Rajesh Khanna films such as Palkon Ki Chhaon Mein, Aanchal, Mehbooba, Amar Prem and Rajshri Productions hits such as Geet Gaata Chal (1975), Nadiya Ke Paar (1982) and Abodh (1984). Her career's best performance was in Naani Maa in 1981, for which she received Best Actress award at the age of 73.

== Personal life ==
Leela Mishra was married to Ram Prasad Mishra, who was a character artist, then working in silent films. She got married at the very young age of 12. By the time she was 17, she had two daughters. She hailed from Jais, Raebareli, and she and her husband were from zamindar (landowners) families.

== Career ==
Leela Mishra was discovered by a man called Mama Shinde, who was working for Dadasaheb Phalke's Nasik Cinetone. He persuaded her husband to make her work in films. During those days there was a severe scarcity of women actors in films; this was evident in the paychecks that the Mishras received when they went to Nasik for the shooting. While Ram Prasad Mishra was hired on a salary of Rs. 150 per month, Leela Mishra was offered Rs. 500 per month. However, as they fared poorly in front of the camera, their contracts were cancelled.

The next opportunity that came their way was an offer to work in the movie Bhikarin, which was being produced by a company owned by the Maharaja of Kolhapur. However, Leela Mishra lost out on this opportunity too, as the role required her to put her arms round the actor (who was not her husband) while delivering a dialogue, which she flatly refused to do.

She faced a similar problem while working in another film titled Honhaar. She was cast opposite Shahu Modak as a heroine, and was supposed to hug and embrace him, which she again refused steadfastly. Since the company was legally in a weak position, they couldn't turn her out of the film, which proved to be a blessing in disguise for her. She was offered the role of Modak's mother in the film and it clicked instantly. This opened the doors for her to play mother roles at the young age of 18.

== Notable works ==
Early on in her career she acted in films such as the musical hit Anmol Ghadi (1946), Raj Kapoor's Awaara (1951) and the Nargis-Balraj Sahni starrer Lajwanti (1958), which was nominated for the Palme d'Or for Best Film at the 1959 Cannes Film Festival.

She acted in the first Bhojpuri film, Ganga Maiyya Tohe Piyari Chadhaibo (1962), which also starred Kumkum, Helen and Nazir Hussain.

Her roles varied from mothers, benign or evil aunts, to comic roles.

== Death ==
She died of a heart attack in Bombay on 17 January 1988 at the age of 80.

== Partial filmography ==
Year	Title	Role	Notes
1941	Chitralekha		
1946	Anmol Ghadi		
1947	Elan		
1948	Rambaan		
1949	Daulat		
1950	Sheesh Mahal		
1951	Aaram		
1951	Awaara		
1952	Daag	Jagat's wife	
1952	Aandhiyan		
1953	Shikast		
1953	Ladki	Mrs. Hazurdas	
1955	Baap Re Baap	Mrs. Jung Bahadur	
1957	Pyaasa		
1958	Sahara		
1958	Lajwanti		
1959	Santan		
1960	College Girl	Ramprasad's Sister	
1961	Suhaag Sindoor		
1962	Umeed		
1962	Ankh Micholi	Geeta Bhalla, Mala's mother	
1962	Ganga Maiyya Tohe Piyari Chadhaibo		Bhojpuri film
1963	Ghar Basake Dekho	Kashi, Ganga's mother	
1964	Leader	Mrs. Khanna	
1964	Dosti		
1965	Chhoti Chhoti Baten		
1966	Pati Patni		
1967	Raat Aur Din		
1967	Milan		
1967	Chhaila Babu		
1967	Nasihat		
1967	Diwana		
1967	Majhli Didi		
1967	Ram Aur Shyam	Shyam's mother	
1967	Bahu Begum	Kareeman Bua	
1968	Pyar Ka Sapna		
1968	Gauri		
1969	Dharti Kahe Pukarke		
1969	Wapas		
1969	Prince		
1969	Sambandh		
1969	Balak		
1969	Do Raaste		
1969	Tumse Achha Kaun Hai	Sheela's mother	
1970	Suhana Safar		
1970	Maa Aur Mamta		
1970	Deedar		
1970	Jawab		
1970	Mastana		
1970	Ishq Par Zor Nahin		
1970	Maa Ka Aanchal		
1971	Dushman		
1971	Lal Patthar		
1971	Patanga		
1971	Khoj		
1971	Purab Aur Pachhim		
1971	Tere Mere Aapne		
1971	Kangan		
1971	Chingari		
1971	Kathputli		
1971	Umeed		
1971	Do Raha		
1971	Uphaar		
1971	Albela		
1971	Mere Apne		
1972	Parichay		
1972	Do Chor		
1972	Tangewala		
1972	Roop Tera Mastana		
1972	Munimji		
1972	Dushmun		
1972	Amar Prem		
1972	Shaadi Ke Baad		
1972	Man Jaiye		
1972	Samadhi		
1972	Annadata		
1973	Saudagar	Badi Bi	
1973	Honeymoon		
1973	Vishnu Paran		
1973	Intezar		
1973	Rocky Mera Naam		
1973	Aangan		
1973	Bada Kabutar	Bhola's Mother	
1974	Khote Sikkay		
1974	Resham Ki Dori		
1975	Maa Ka Aanchal		
1975	Phanda		
1975	Jai Santoshi Maa		
1975	Prem Kahani		
1975	Sankalp		
1975	Pratiggya		
1975	Sholay		
1975	Geet Gaata Chal		
1975	Khushboo		
1976	Bairaag		
1976	Do Shatru		
1976	Kalicharan		
1976	Mehbooba		
1976	Gumrah		
1976	Khaan Dost		
1976	Rakhe Aur Rifle		
1976	Zindagi		
1976	Phool aur Insaan		
1977	Paheli		
1977	Tinku		
1977	Palkon Ki Chhaon Mein		
1977	Kinara		
1977	Jadu Tona		
1977	Niyaz Aur Namaaz		
1977	Dulhan Wahi Jo Piya Man Bhaaye	housekeeper	
1977	Shatranj ke Khilari		
1978	Nasbandi		
1978	Heeralaal Pannalal		
1978	Dil Se Mile Dil		
1978	Aankhein Dekhi		
1978	Saajan Bina Suhagan		
1978	Phool Khile Hain Gulshan Gulshan		
1979	Sunayana		
1979	Ghar Ki Laaj		
1979	Naiyya		
1979	Ahsaas		
1979	Sawan Ko Aane Do		
1979	Salaam Memsaab		
1979	Raadha Aur Seeta		
1979	Sargam		
1979	Baton Baton Mein		
1980	Angaar		
1980	Jazbaaz		
1980	Abdullah		
1980	Saajan Ki Saheli		
1980	Men Pansad		
1980	Chetna Do Rahe Par		
1980	Hum Nahin Sudhrenge		
1980	Thodisi Bewafaii		
1980	Aanchal		
1980	Pathar Se Takkar		
1981	Nani Maa		Best Actress and Best Comedy Diploma Award – Moscow Film festival – India
1981	Ek Hi Bhool		
1981	Ghungroo Ki Awaaz		
1981	Daasi		
1981	Ahista Ahista		
1981	Chashme Buddoor		
1982	Chorni		
1982	Shriman Shrimati		
1982	Nadiya Ke Paar		
1982	Dil..Aakhir Dil Hai		
1982	Prem Rog		
1982	Log Kya Kahenge		
1982	Bheegi Palkein		
1982	Aamne Samne		
1983	Katha		
1983	Sun Meri Laila		
1983	Doosri Dulhan		
1983	Sajal Da Mang Hamaar		Bhojpuri film
1983	Humse Na Jeeta Koi		
1983	Sadma		
1984	Abodh		
1984	Pakhandi		
1984	Yeh Ishq Nahin Aasaan		
1984	Tohfa		
1985	Prem Rog		
1985	Telephone		
1985	Meraa Ghar Mere Bachche		
1985	Kuk Doo Doo		
1985	Pighalta Aasman		
1985	Dil Ek Musafir		
1986	Tan-Badan		
1986	Dada Dadi Ki Kahaniyan		TV Series
1986	Samay Ki Dhaara		
1986	Maqaar		
1987	Buniyaad		TV Series
1988	Shiva Shakti		
1988	Veerana		
1988	Soorma Bhopali		
1988	Zakhmi Aurat		
1989	Daata		
1989	Purani Haveli		
1989	Kaisan Banaul Sansar		Bhojpuri film
