= Padma Khanna =

Indian actress

- Born: Patna, Bihar, India
- Occupation: Actress
- Years active: 1961–1996
- Spouse: Jagdish Sidana (m. 1986)

Padma Khanna is an Indian Bollywood actress, dancer and director. She appeared mainly in Hindi and Bhojpuri films in the 1970s and 1980s. She is most remembered for her role in the film Saudagar with Amitabh Bachchan and also as Queen Kaikeyi in Ramanand Sagar's epic series Ramayan (1987–88). She has appeared in two Telugu films with N. T. Rama Rao, in Desoddarakulu and Rajaputra Rahasyam. She also acted in Odia movie Sakshi Gopinath(1978). She has acted in Bhojpuri movie like Birhin Janam Janam ke.

== Early life ==
Khanna was born in Patna. Around age 7, she began her classical dance training in Kathak from Pandit Kishen Maharaj in Varanasi, and later continued advanced training with Gopi Krishna. She began performing on stage from the age of 12, often accompanied by notable musicians such as Pundit Shamta Prasad.

She and was introduced to Bollywood by actresses Padmini and Vyjayanthimala.

== Career ==
Khanna debuted as an actress in the 1962 Bhojpuri film Ganga Maiyya Tohe Piyari Chadhaibo. She got her break in 1970 when she played a cabaret dancer in Johnny Mera Naam. She often played dancers, appearing in films like Loafer, Jaan-e-Bahaar and Pakeezah in which she acted as a double for Meena Kumari in the opening sequence and the songs Chalo Dildaar Chalo and Teer-E-Nazar Dekhenge. In the 1980s, she played Queen Kaikeyi in Ramanand Sagar's Ramayan which aired on Doordarshan.

In 2008, she choreographed and acted in a musical based on the epic Ramayana with 64 actors and dancers at Avery Fisher Hall, New York City, directed by her husband, Jagdish L. Sidana. She also directed a Bhojpuri film, Nahir Hutal Jaya (2004).

== Personal life ==
She was married to the late film director Jagdish L. Sidana. The couple moved to the state of New Jersey in United States in the 1990s where they opened a kathak academy. Khanna's adult children help her to run the academy.

== Filmography ==
Television

- Pehchaan (2006) on Hum TV
- Taank Jhaank on Sony TV
- Ramayan on Doordarshan as Kaikeyi
- Metha Zaher on Doordarshan

Hindi films

- Apne Huye Paraye (1964) As A Padma Kumari
- Biwi Aur Makaan (1966)
- Yeh Zindagi Kitni Haseen Hai (1966)
- Saaz aur Aawaz (1966)
- Baharon Ke Sapne (1967)
- Chand Par Chadayee (1967)
- Aashirwad 1968 (1968) As A Padma Kumari
- Heer Raanjha (1970)
- Johny Mera Naam (1970)
- Pardesi (1970)
- Parde Ke Peechey (1971)
- Seema (1971)
- Chingari (1971)
- Dastaan (1972 film) (1972)
- Pyar Diwana (1972)
- Rampur Ka Lakshman (1972)
- Pakeezah (1972) (body double of Meena Kumari)
- Saudagar (1973)
- Daag (1973 film)
- Joshila (1973)
- Anhonee (1973)
- Naina (1973)
- Anokhi Ada (1973)
- Aaj Ki Taaza Khabar (1973)
- Loafer (1973)
- Kashmakash (1973)
- Aakhri Dao (1975)
- Hera Pheri (1976)
- Paapi (1977)
- Lakhan (1979)
- Jaan-e-Bahaar (1979)
- Noorie (1979)
- Banmanush (1980)
- Dhuan (1981)
- Anubhav (1986)
- Ghar Sansar (1986)
- Ghar Ghar Ki Kahani (1988)
- Farz Ki Jung (1989)
- Yaar Meri Zindagi (2008)

Bhojpuri films

- Ganga Maiyya Tohe Piyari Chadhaibo (1963)
- Bidesiya (1963)
- Balam Pardesia (1979)
- Dharti Maiya (1981)
- Dagabaj Balma
- Bahuria
- Godna
- Tulsi Sorhe Hamar Angna
- Kajari
- Rangali Chunaria Rang Me Tohar
- Bhauji De Da Aacharawa Ke Chao
- Saiyan Tore Karan (1981)
- Bhaiya Dooj (1984)
- Hey Tulsi Maiya
- Thakurayeen (1984)
- Basuria Baje Ganga Teer (1986)
- Mai (1989)
- Dharti Ki Aawaz (1987)

Gujarati Films

- Vir Mangdavalo (1976)
- Gher Gher Maati na chula (1977)

Odia Films

- Sakshi Gopinath (1978)

Punjabi films

- Jindri Yaar Di (1978)
- Sher Puttar (1978)

Marathi and Telugu film

- Deshoddharakudu (1973)
- Rajaputra Rahasyam (1978)
- Devta (1983 film) Cameo in song "Khel Kunala Daivacha Kalala"
- Maaficha Sakshidar (1986) - Cameo in song "Shama Ne Jab Aag"
