= Chivaraku Migiledi =

1960 film

- Directed by: Gutha Ramineedu
- Written by: Pitcheswara Rao Atluri; Ashutosh Mukhopadhyay (Bengali short story)
- Produced by: Purushotham Reddy Vuppunuthula
- Starring: K. Savithri; Kanta Rao; Prabhakar Reddy; Mannava Balayya; Ramana Reddy; Raja Babu; Chedalawada Jhansi
- Cinematography: M. K. Raju
- Edited by: V. Ankireddy
- Music by: Aswathama
- Distributed by: Manjeera Films
- Release date: 1960
- Country: India
- Language: Telugu

Chivaraku Migiledi (transl. What remains at the end) is a 1960 Indian Telugu-language romance film, written and directed by Gutha Ramineedu. The film was a remake of the Bengali film Deep Jwele Jaai. The Bengali film Deep Jwele Jaai was a huge critical and commercial success. Impressed by the story line, producer Vuppunuthula Purushotham Reddy and director G. Ramineedu remade the Bengali film into Chivaraku Migiledi (1960). Another remake in Hindi was made by Asit Sen, Khamoshi, at the same time. Waheeda Rehman said in an interview that she could not meet the standards set by Suchitra Sen and Savitri for the character she played in Khamoshi.

== Plot ==
This is a story of a nurse in a psychiatric hospital, played by Savitri. The character is a part of a team exploring new therapy for patients who have suffered emotional trauma. The approach taken by the team is to offer these individuals an emotional resort, which is where Savitri's character plays her part. Her role is to act as a friend and a lover for the patient, but at the same time, refrain from any emotional involvement on her own part as her role is purely that of a nurse who is helping the patient recover. She has to repeatedly break the emotional attachments that she experiences because as a nurse, she is a part of therapy.

The movie looks at the neglected emotional trauma of this nurse who is used merely as a tool in the whole process of therapy. The movie ends by showing that Savitri is being admitted to the same ward where she used to be a nurse. The last words in the movie are uttered by Savithri, who whispers "I wasn't acting, I couldn't" indicating that she indeed fell in love with her patient.

== Cast ==
- K. Savithri as Padma
- Kanta Rao as Bhaskar
- Prabhakar Reddy as Colonel S. R. Chandra
- M. Balayya as Prakasam
- Ramana Reddy as Prakasam’s cousin
- Raja Babu
- Chedalawada Jhansi as Prakasam’s father
- Balakrishna
- Sitaram
- Nalla Rammurthy

== Music ==
- "Andaaniki Andham Nene" - Jamuna Rani
- "Ayinavaaru" - Ghantasala
- "Sudhavol Suhaasini" - Ghantasala
- "Kavi Koyila" - P. Susheela
- "Chenguna Alameeda" - M. S. Ramarao
- "Chinnari Nee Manase" - Mukkamala Sunanda

== Awards ==
National honor

- Savitri received the Rashtrapati Award for her performance in the film.
