= Ei Raat Tomar Amar =

1959 song by Hemanta Mukherjee

Single by Hemanta Mukhopadhyay

from the album Deep Jwele Jai
- Language: Bengali
- English title: This night is yours and mine
- Released: May 1, 1959
- Length: 3:01
- Label: Saregama
- Composer: Hemanta Mukhopadhyay
- Lyricist: Gauriprasanna Mazumder
- Producer: Hemanta Mukhopadhyay

Lyrical video
- "Ei Raat Tomar Amar on YouTube

"Ei Raat Tomar Amar" is a Bengali-language song by Indian playback singer Hemanta Mukhopadhyay. It was written by lyricist Gauriprasanna Mazumder and was composed and produced by Mukhopadhyay. It is a romantic song describing a passionate night with celebrations of love. It was featured in the film Deep Jwele Jai, released on May 1, 1959 and directed by Asit Sen. One of the most popular Bengali songs of Mukherjee (Mukhopadhyay), it became a cultural mark in Bengali music.

== Use in Deep Jwele Jai ==
"Ei Raat Tomar Amar", while written and sung in a romantic context in its first use in Deep Jwele Jai, was used for a second time during the ending in the scene of a mental breakdown. Mahmud Nawaz Joy writes that the song's music and lyrics are focused on romance and love, but it is used for the second time where the film's heroine (Suchitra Sen) gets admitted to the mental hospital she used to work in, at the end of the film, calling the ending and song heartbreaking like a lingering sigh.

As the song begins for the first time in the film, Radha (played by Suchitra Sen) walks in a trance-like state towards the conjectural source of the sound. Nandini Ramnath writes in an article of Scroll.in: "The camera is transfixed by her beauty and pathos, and ravishes her face with close-ups. The song comes and goes in fragments, providing an apt sonic metaphor for Radha’s obsessive love. She is going to repeat the mistake with Tapash (Basanta Choudhury), another young man turned insane by love. Ei Raat Tomar Amar also functions as a warning that Radha and her obdurate boss refuse to heed."

Karan Bali comments on the song in his article, saying that the movie avoids loud melodrama and is subtly shot and told with the "poetic use of low-key lightning". Bali says that the film uses songs only when it has to, commenting that it makes "splendid use" of "Ei Raat Tomar Amar" describing the unrequited love between Radha and Debasish (actor not disclosed).

Deep Jwele Jai served as one of the most popular performances of Suchitra Sen. The music and lyrics of the film played an important role in spreading its popularity. The plot focuses on the relationship between Tapash (Basanta Choudhury) and Radha. The film music has been described as one of the most popular in Bengali cinema. The first song of the film was "Ei Raat Tomar Amar", which used a whistling chorus as a sort of leitmotif, contributed greatly to the success of its film.

== Remakes and popular culture ==
Full song from Deep Jwele Jai.

Mukherjee used the same music and melody of Bengali song "Ei Raat Tomar Amar" in the Hindi song "Yeh Nayan Dare Dare", written by Kaifi Azmi with music by Mukherjee. It was used in the 1964 Hindi film Kohra by Biren Nag. Deep Jwele Jai was remade in Hindi as the 1969 film Khamoshi, also directed by Asit Sen. Hemanta Mukherjee also composed the music for it. However, it featured no remake song of "Ei Raat Tomar Amar" into Hindi despite having remakes of all other songs that were used in Deep Jwele Jai. In its place, the song "Tum Pukar Lo" was used which was entirely different from both the Bengali original and the Hindi remake.

The 2025 film Ei Raat Tomar Amaar directed by Parambrata Chatterjee was named after this song. It was reported by newspapers that he made this movie based on Hemanta Mukherjee's song from Deep Jwele Jai. The story was inspired by the song. Besides directing it, Chatterjee also played a role in it, modeling his character appearance on this song's singer Mukherjee.
