= Apradhi Kaun? (1957 film) =

- Directed by: Asit Sen
- Written by: Vrajendra Gaur
- Screenplay by: Raghunath Jhalani
- Story by: Premendra Mitra
- Based on: Kaalo Chhaya by Premendra Mitra
- Produced by: Bimal Roy
- Starring: Abhi Bhattacharya; Mala Sinha; Gajanan Jagirdar
- Cinematography: Kamal Bose
- Edited by: Das Dhaimade
- Music by: Salil Chowdhury
- Production company: Bimal Roy Productions
- Distributed by: Bimal Roy Productions
- Release date: 1957
- Country: India
- Language: Hindi

Apradhi Kaun? (transl. Who is the perpetrator?) is a 1957 Indian Hindi-language mystery thriller film directed by Asit Sen and produced by Bimal Roy. The film stars Abhi Bhattacharya, Mala Sinha and Gajanan Jagirdar. It is based on the Bengali novel Kaalo Chhaya by Premendra Mitra.

== Plot ==
After Shrinath, a wealthy heir is murdered, the people of his household are suspected. Rajesh Nath, the private investigator handling the case, later falls in love with one of them.

== Cast ==
- Abhi Bhattacharya as Rajesh Nath
- Mala Sinha as Shobha
- Gajanan Jagirdar as Shrinath and Dinanath
- Kammo as Champa
- Paul Mahendra as Inspector Varma
- Tarun Bose
- LIllian as Lillian Ezra

== Soundtrack ==
All songs were composed by Salil Chowdhury, with lyrics written by Majrooh Sultanpuri.

| Song | Singer(s) | Notes | Duration |
|---|---|---|---|
| "Mera Dil Dil Dil Dil Dilla (Tere Dil Se Mere Dil Ka)" | Asha Bhosle | Picturised on Lillian | 5:20 |
| "Hain Pyaar Ke Do Matwale" | Manna Dey, Geeta Dutt | Picturised on Kumud Tripathi and Kammo | 3:35 |
| "Baat Koi Matlab Ki Hai Zaroor" | Asha Bhosle | Picturised on Lillian | 3:03 |
| "Koi Dekhe To Kahe Tujhko" | Asha Bhosle | Picturised on Mala Sinha | 3:07 |
| "Phir Wohi Dard Hai, Phir Wohi Jigar" | Manna Dey | Picturised on Dhumal (actor) and Kumud Tripathi | 4:16 |
