= Tarun Bose =

Indian actor

- Born: 28 September 1928; Calcutta, India
- Died: 8 March 1972 (aged 43); Kolkata, India
- Years active: 1957–1972

Tarun Bose (14 September 1928 – 8 March 1972) was an Indian actor, active in Bollywood during the 1960s and 1970s.

== Early life and education ==
Bose was born in Kolkata, though he grew up in Nagpur, where he studied at St. Francis High School. Early in his teen he started performing local plays and at the age of 15 he auditioned for the newly opened All India Radio, Nagpur, where he went on to work in radio plays.

== Career ==
After completing his education, he started working with the Post and Telegraph Department, so that he could pursue acting on the side, without any family pressure.

Bose made his film debut in 1957 in the Asit Sen film, Apradhi Kaun? (1957), which also starred Mala Sinha and Abhi Bhattacharya. His acting in Bimal Roy's Sujata (1959) was appreciated, where he was cast with Nutan, Sunil Dutt and Sulochana.

Bose was noted for his intense performances in movies such as Gumnaam, Bandini (1963), Anupama (1966), Devar, Mujhe Jeene Do (1963), Aan Milo Sajna and several other movies in the sixties and early seventies. He has worked with eminent actors such as Ashok Kumar, Dharmendra, Manoj Kumar, Sunil Dutt, Balraj Sahni and Amitabh Bachchan among others. From the directors, he has worked with Bimal Roy, Hrishikesh Mukherjee, Satyen Bose, Asit Sen, Dulal Guha and others.

He starred in at least 41 films between 1957 and 1972 and gained a reputation for playing middle class professional figures, particularly doctors and occasionally judges or lawyers. He died on 8 March 1972.

== Filmography ==
Year	Title	Role	Notes
1957	Apradhi Kaun? (1957 film)	Doctor	
1958	Madhumati	Doctor (Deven's Colleague)	
1959	Sujata	Upendranath Chowdhury	
1960	Usne Kaha Tha	Hawaldar Ram Singh	
1961	Shama	Dilawar	
1961	Kabuliwala	Doctor	
1961	Bhaiyya	Parmanand	
1961	Kanch Ki Gudiya	Raju's Father	
1962	Maa Beta	Ganga Sahay	
1962	Umeed	Shukla	
1963	Bandini	Mahesh Chandra	
1963	Meri Surat Teri Ankhen	Dr. Mathur	
1963	Mujhe Jeene Do	Superintendent of Police	
1963	Begaana		
1964	Benazir	Shauket	
1964	Kohra	Ramesh	
1965	Chand Aur Suraj	Barrister Mohan	
1965	Gumnaam	Madhusudan Sharma	
1965	Oonche Log	Mohan Prabhu	
1965	Akashdeep		
1965	Faraar	Shyam Sunder	
1965	Bhaiyaa		
1966	Anupama	Mohan Sharma	
1966	Devar	Advocate Gopinath	
1966	Love in Tokyo	Doctor P.C. Roy	
1966	Toofan Men Pyar Kahan	Rai Mohan	
1966	Pyar Mohabbat		
1967	Chhoti Si Mulaqat	Shanker Choudhury	
1967	Jaal	Sheila's servant (with fake mask)	
1968	Anokhi Raat	Madanlal	
1969	Oos Raat Ke Baad	Lakhan Pal	
1969	Jyoti	Engineer	
1969	Dharti Kahe Pukarke	'Mahendra Babu'Rekha's father	
1969	Insaaf Ka Mandir	Badri Prasad	
1969	Satyakam	Mr. Ladia	
1970	Aan Milo Sajna	Judge	
1970	Ganwaar	Raja Ram Pratap Rai	
1970	Gunah Aur Kanoon	Mr. Bose	
1970	Maharaja	Kalicharan	
1971	Purani Pehchan	Sandhya's father	
1971	Chhoti Bahu	Shriram	
1971	Memsaab	Inspector Dixit	
1971	Memsaab	Inspector Dixit	
1971	Bikhare Moti	Jeevan	
1971	Parde Ke Peechey	Gardener	
1971	Hum Tum Aur Woh	Shyam Lal	
1972	Aankhon Aankhon Mein	Kulwant Rai	
1972	Ek Nazar	Raghunath Tyagi	
1972	Annadata	Ratna's Father	
1972	Anokha Daan		
1972	Ek Khilari Bawan Pattey	Shekhar's Father	
1973	Jyot Jale	Amarnath	
1973	Mehmaan	Tarun	
1974	Jeevan Sangram	Commander	
1974	Vachan	Saxena	
1976	Do Ladkiyan	Rai Bahadue Raghunath Khanna	(final film role)
