= 18th Filmfare Awards =

1971 awards for Hindi cinema

- Date: 18 April 1971
- Site: Bombay

Highlights
- Best Film: Khilona
- Best Actor: Rajesh Khanna for Sachaa Jhutha
- Best Actress: Mumtaz for Khilona
- Most awards: Pehchan (4)
- Most nominations: Pehchan (9)

The 18th Filmfare Awards were held on April 18, 1971, honouring the best Hindi cinema films released in 1970.

Pehchan led the ceremony with 9 nominations, followed by Do Raaste with 7 nominations and Khilona with 6 nominations.

Pehchan won 4 awards, including Best Supporting Actress (for Chand Usmani), thus becoming the most-awarded film at the ceremony.

Feroz Khan received dual nominations for Best Supporting Actor for his performances in Aadmi Aur Insaan and Safar, winning for the former, his only win in the category.

== Main awards ==
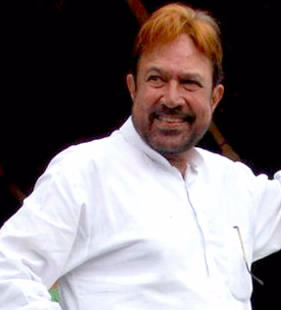
Rajesh Khanna — Best Actor winner for Sachaa Jhutha

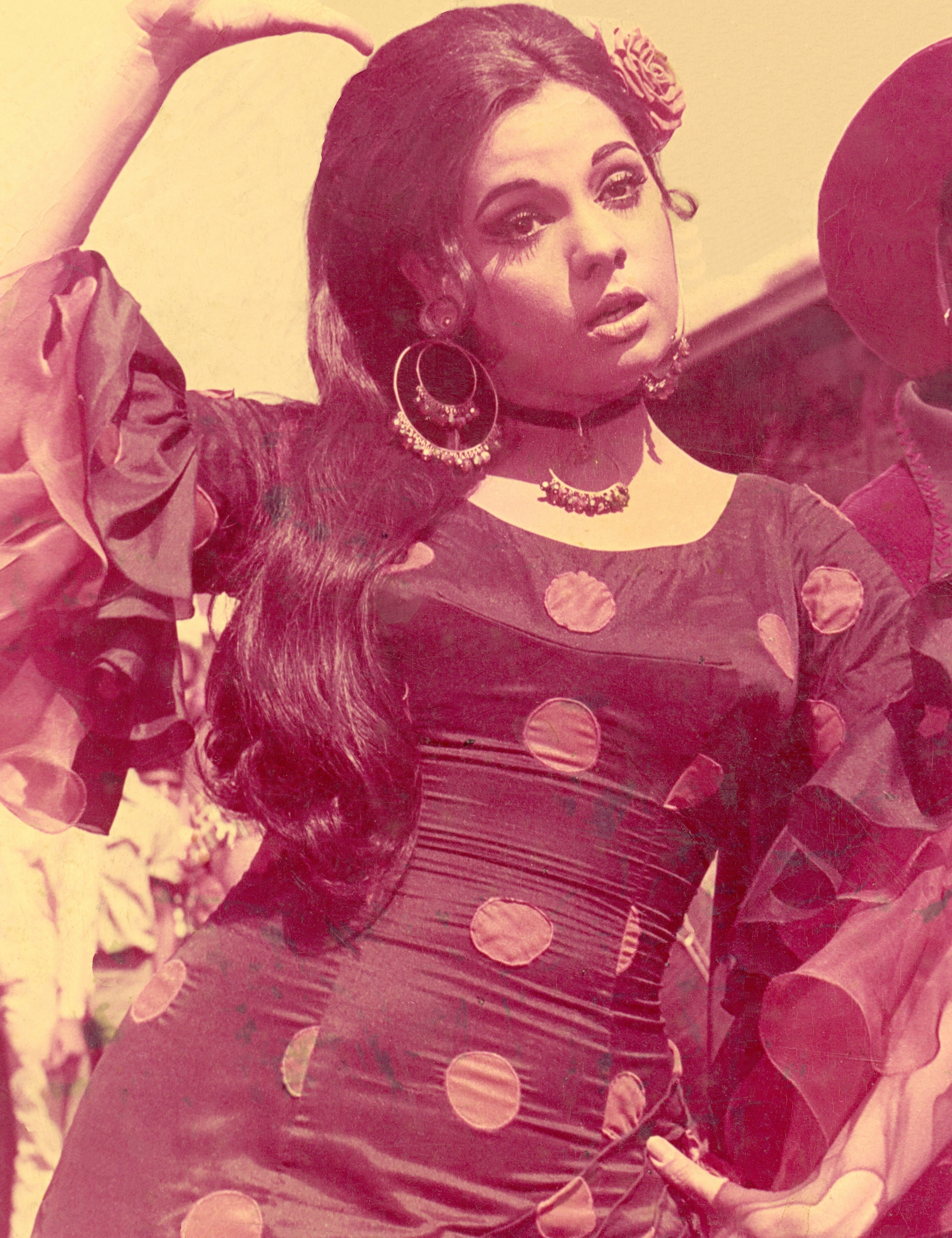
Mumtaz — Best Actress winner for Khilona

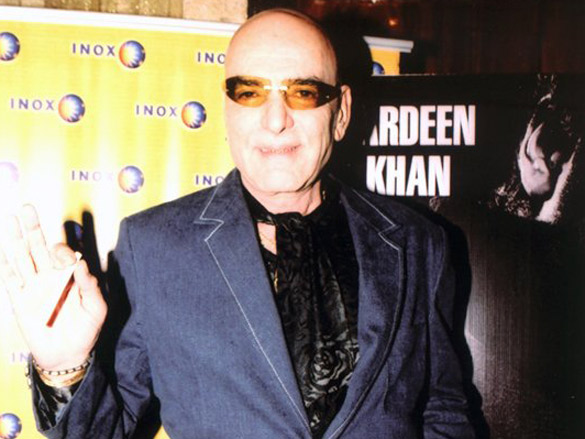
Feroz Khan — Best Supporting Actor winner for Aadmi Aur Insaan

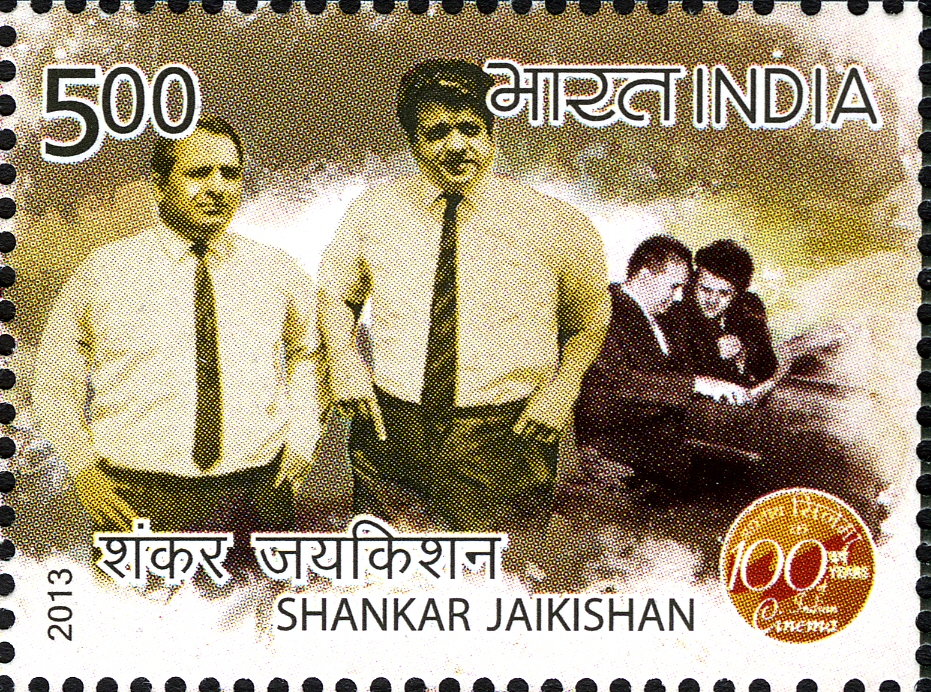
Shankar–Jaikishan — Best Music Director winner for Pehchan

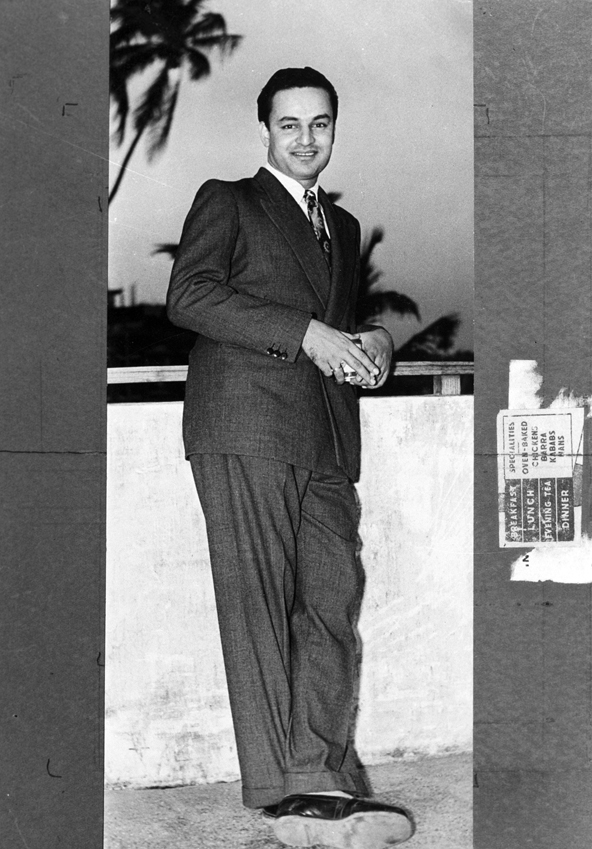
Mukesh — Best Playback singer, Male winner for "Sabse Bada Naadaan" (Pehchan)

=== Best Film ===
Khilona

- Do Raaste
- Pehchan

=== Best Director ===
Asit Sen – Safar

- Raj Khosla – Do Raaste
- Sohanlal Kanwar – Pehchan

=== Best Actor ===
Rajesh Khanna – Sachaa Jhutha

- Dilip Kumar – Gopi
- Sanjeev Kumar – Khilona

=== Best Actress ===
Mumtaz – Khilona

- Sharmila Tagore – Safar
- Waheeda Rehman – Khamoshi

=== Best Supporting Actor ===
Feroz Khan – Aadmi Aur Insaan

- Feroz Khan – Safar
- Prem Chopra – Himmat

=== Best Supporting Actress ===
Chand Usmani – Pehchan

- Bindu – Do Raaste
- Mumtaz – Aadmi Aur Insaan

=== Best Comic Actor ===
I. S. Johar – Johnny Mera Naam

- Jagdeep – Khilona
- Mehmood – Humjoli

=== Best Story ===
Do Raaste – Chandrakant Kakodkar

- Khilona – Gulshan Nanda
- Pehchan – Sachin Bhowmick

=== Best Screenplay ===
Johnny Mera Naam – Vijay Anand

=== Best Dialogue ===
Satyakam – Rajinder Singh Bedi

=== Best Music Director ===
Pehchan – Shankar-Jaikishan

- Do Raaste – Laxmikant–Pyarelal
- Talaash – S.D. Burman

=== Best Lyricist ===
Pehchan – Verma Malik for Sabse Bada Nadan

- Do Raaste – Anand Bakshi for Bindiya Chamkegi
- Pehchan – Gopaldas Neeraj for Bas Yehi Apradh

=== Best Playback Singer, Male ===
Pehchan – Mukesh for Sabse Bada Nadan

- Khilona – Mohammad Rafi for Khilona Jankar
- Pehchan – Mukesh for Bas Yehi Apradh

=== Best Playback Singer, Female ===
Jahan Pyar Mile – Sharda for Baat Zara

- Do Raaste – Lata Mangeshkar for Bindiya Chamkegi
- Johnny Mera Naam – Lata Mangeshkar for Babul Pyaare

=== Best Color Art Direction ===
Talaash – Shanti Das

=== Best B&W Art Direction ===
Not Awarded

=== Best B&W Cinematography ===
Khamoshi – Kamal Bose

=== Best Color Cinematography ===
Heer Raanjha – Jal Mistry

=== Best Editing ===
Johnny Mera Naam – Vijay Anand

=== Best Sound ===
Talaash – S.C. Bhambri

== Critics' awards ==
=== Best Film ===
Uski Roti

=== Best Documentary ===
Koodal

== Special awards ==
Balraj Sahni

== Biggest Winners ==
- Pehchan – 4/9
- Johnny Mera Naam – 3/4
- Talaash – 2/3
- Khilona – 2/6
- Do Raaste – 1/7
- Safar – 1/3

== See also ==
- 20th Filmfare Awards
- 19th Filmfare Awards
- Filmfare Awards
