= Ami, Shey O Shakha =

1975 Indian film by Mangal Chakraborty

- Directed by: Mangal Chakravorty
- Based on: Ami, Shey O Shakha by Ashutosh Mukhopadhyay
- Screenplay by: Mangal Chakravarty
- Story by: Ashutosh Mukhopadhyay
- Produced by: Shyamal Mitra; Deepen Bhattacharya
- Starring: Uttam Kumar; Anil Chatterjee; Arati Bhattacharya; Kaberi Bose
- Narrated by: Kaberi Bose
- Cinematography: Bijoy Ghosh
- Edited by: Rabin Das
- Music by: Shyamal Mitra
- Production company: S. D. Productions
- Distributed by: Chandrima Pictures Pvt. Ltd.
- Release date: 11 April 1975
- Country: India
- Language: Bengali

Ami, Shey O Shakha (Bengali pronunciation: [ami, ʃe o ʃakʰa] transl. Me, Him and Our Friend) is a 1975 Indian Bengali-language drama film co-written and directed by Mangal Chakravarty. Produced by Shyamal Mitra and Deepen Bhattacharya under the banner of S. D. Productions, the film is based on a novel of the same name by Ashutosh Mukhopadhyay. It stars Uttam Kumar in dual roles, alongside Anil Chatterjee, Arati Bhattacharya and Kaberi Bose in lead roles.

The film plots a deprived person who is indebted for virtually everything he has, lands in a perplexing situation, finding himself in a situation where he has to give up his love and profession. It marks the fifth collaboration between Chakraborty and Kumar, and is also the second film of Kumar and Bhattacharya together. Filming took places in Kolkata, Digha and Lucknow. Music of the film is composed by Mitra himself, with lyrics penned by Gauriprasanna Mazumder. The cinematography and editing were handled by Bijoy Ghosh and Rabin Das respectively.

Ami, Shey O Shakha theatrically released on 11 April 1975, opening to highly positive reviews. It got appraisal for its screenplay, cinematography, score and the specific performance by Kumar in dual roles. Gaining a cult status over the years, Ami, Shey O Shakha was remade into Hindi by Hrishikesh Mukherjee as Bemisal (1982), with Amitabh Bachchan, Vinod Mehra and Rakhee Gulzar playing the characters originally played Kumar, Chatterjee and Bose respectively. Ravi Kinnagi also felicitated the film in his directorial Premi (2004), starring Jeet and Jisshu Sengupta.

== Cast ==
- Uttam Kumar in dual roles
  - Dr. Sudhir Dutta
    - Master Goutam as young Sudhir
  - Adhir Dutta, Sudhir's elder brother
- Anil Chatterjee as Dr. Prashanta Roy, Sudhir's friend
  - Master Swapan as young Prashanta
- Kaberi Bose as Chandrani Roy, Prashanta's wife
- Arati Bhattacharya as Moitreyee
- Basabi Nandi as Sulekha
- Asit Baran as Magistrate Roy, Prashanta's father
- Tarun Kumar as Dr. Amal Bose
- Ardhendu Mukherjee as Mihir Kiran Chowdhury, Chandrani's maternal grandfather
- Basanti Chatterjee

== Music ==
Ami, Shey O Shakha

Soundtrack album to Ami, Shey O Shakha by Shyamal Mitra
- Genre: Feature Film Soundtrack
- Length: 6:35
- Label: Saregama
- Producer: Shyamal Mitra

Shyamal Mitra chronology
| Phulu Thakurma (1975) | Ami, Shey O Shakha (1975) | Rajbangsha (1977) |
External audio
- Ami, Shey O Shakha Audio Jukebox on YouTube

Shyamal Mitra composed music of the film in his first collaboration with Chakravarty. The soundtrack consists of two tracks, each penned by Gauriprasanna Mazumder.

Track listing
| No. | Title | Singer(s) | Length |
|---|---|---|---|
| 1. | "Emon Swapna Kokhono Dekhini Age" | Haimanti Shukla | 3:35 |
| 2. | "Ei Hashi Manay Naa To" | Shyamal mitra | 3:11 |
| Total length: | | | 6:46 |

== Remake ==
In 1982, Hrishikesh Mukherjee remade Ami, Shey O Shakha into Hindi as Bemisal. In the film, Amitabh Bachchan stepped into Kumar's shoes, while Vinod Mehra and Rakhee Gulzar portrayed the characters played by Chatterjee and Bose respectively.

Ravi Kinnagi felicitated the film in Premi (2004), which was an adaptation of Moti Nandi's story Aparajito Ananda.
