= Kamal Bose =

Indian cinematographer

- Born: 1915; Calcutta, British India
- Died: 9 October 1995 (age 80)
- Occupations: cinematographer, director of photography
- Years active: 1948–1994

Kamal Bose (1915–1995) was an Indian cinematographer, who shot most of Bimal Roy classics, including Parineeta (1953), Do Bigha Zamin (1953), Bandini (1963), Devdas (1955) and Sujata (1960). He successfully transitioned into the coloured film era, and shot Qurbani (1980), Janbaaz (1986) and Dayavan (1988).

During his career, he won the Filmfare Award for Best Cinematographer record five times, Bandini (B&W, 1964), Anokhi Raat (B&W, 1970), Khamoshi (B&W, 1971), Dastak (B&W, 1972), Dharmatma (1976).

== Career ==
Bose was an important part of auteur Bimal Roy's team, starting with Anjangarh (1948), one of the last major films of the New Theatres in Kolkata, however Kolkata based film industry was now on the decline, thus Roy shifted base to Bombay (now Mumbai) along with his team, which included Hrishikesh Mukherjee, Nabendu Ghosh, Asit Sen, Bose and later Salil Chaudhury, and by 1952 he has restarted the second phase of his career with Maa (1952) for Bombay Talkies. Thereafter Bose collaborated with Roy in all his subsequent films, Parineeta (1953, The Fiancee), adaptation of Sharat Chandra Chattopadhyay novel by the same name, in same year came the neo-realism classic, Do Bigha Zamin (1953), which not only won the Filmfare Best Movie Award but also became the first Indian film to win the International Prize at the Cannes Film Festival. Their association continued with Naukri (1954), Baap Beti (1954), Devdas (1955), Amaanat (1955), Sujata (1960), Parakh (1960) and Bandini (1963), which won Bose his first Filmfare Award was especially noted for his masterly use of black and white, to bring "texture and form in simplicity mixed with richness", especially in the way he captured the starkness and gloom of the prison environment, while depicting women at work. Previously, his lighting in film, Devdas (1955) was also noted as it enhanced the emotional torment of the tight-lipped protagonist, played by Dilip Kumar.

Meanwhile, he also shot, Musafir (1957, Traveller), directorial debut of Bimal Roy's editor and assistant Hrishikesh Mukherjee, the film is still remembered for its panoramic shots; and Kabuliwala (1961) Hemen Gupta's adaptation of Rabindranath Tagore story, by the same name, starring Balraj Sahni, and produced by Bimal Roy.

Roy died in 1966, thereafter Bose started working with Asit Sen, and went on to receive critical acclaim for his B & W cinematography in Apradhi Kaun? (1957), his one-night tragedy, Anokhi Raat (1968, Strange Night) and the psychiatric ward tragedy, Khamoshi (1969, Silence), starring Rajesh Khanna and Waheeda Rehman, and Safar (1970, Journey) marked his transition in to colour films. The first two films, also won him his second and third Filmfare Awards. Though Bose continued to work with Sen for another decade, none of the films achieved the commercial success of those early films.

His next important collaboration was with actor-director Feroze Khan, which began with latter's debut the action-thriller Apradh (1972), thereafter he shot all of Khan's subsequent directorial ventures, including his next Dharmatma (1975). Shot in Afghanistan, the film was noted for its scenes featuring Buzkashi, a Central Asian sport on horses, including the aerial shots, which in turn won him another Filmfare award. In the 1980s, he shot, the highly glamorous, Qurbani (1980), Janbaaz (1986) and Dayavan (1988), his last film with Khan. In his late 70s, Bose did one more film Chauraha (1994).

He died on 9 October 1995, at the age of 80. His son, Palash Bose is a commercial photographer based in Mumbai.

== Filmography ==
- Anjangarh (1948)
- Mantramugdha (1949)
- Parineeta (1953)
- Pardesi (1953)
- Naukri (1954)
- Baap Beti (1954)
- Do Bigha Zamin (1953)
- Devdas (1955)
- Amaanat (1955)
- Musafir (1957)
- Apradhi Kaun? (1957)
- Sujata (1960)
- Parakh (1960)
- Kabuliwala (1961)
- Bandini (1963)
- Ezhu Rathrikal (1968, Malayalam)
- Anokhi Raat (1968)
- Khamoshi (1969)
- Safar (1970)
- My Love (1970)
- Dastak (1970)
- Apradh (1972)
- Annadata (1972)
- Dharmatma (1975)
- Bairaag (1976)
- Qurbani (1980)
- Vakil Babu (1982)
- Janbaaz (1986)
- Dayavan (1988)
- Chauraha (1994)

== Awards ==
- Filmfare Award
  - Best Cinematographer
    - 1964: Bandini (B&W)
    - 1970: Anokhi Raat (B&W)
    - 1971: Khamoshi (B&W)
    - 1972: Dastak (B&W)
    - 1976: Dharmatma
