= Khamoshi (1969 film) =

- Directed by: Asit Sen
- Written by: Asit Sen (screenplay); Gulzar (dialogue)
- Story by: Ashutosh Mukherjee
- Based on: Nurse Mitra, a short story by Ashutosh Mukherjee
- Produced by: Hemant Kumar
- Starring: Waheeda Rehman; Rajesh Khanna; Dharmendra (special appearance)
- Cinematography: Kamal Bose
- Music by: Hemant Kumar
- Production company: Geetanjali Pictures
- Release date: 25 April 1969
- Running time: 127 min
- Country: India
- Language: Hindi

Khamoshi (transl. Silence) is a 1969 black-and-white Hindi drama film directed by Asit Sen, starring Waheeda Rehman and Rajesh Khanna. It is especially remembered for its memorable music by Hemant Kumar and lyrics by Gulzar in songs such as "Tum Pukaar Lo... Tumhara Intezaar Hai" sung by Hemant Kumar, "Woh Shaam Kuch Ajeeb Thi" by Kishore Kumar and "Humne Dekhi Hai In Aankhon Ki Mehekti Khushboo" sung by Lata Mangeshkar. Though what really made this film stand out was the B&W cinematography by Kamal Bose, who won Best Cinematographer at the 18th Filmfare Awards for his work in the film and received high critical acclaim for Rehman and Khanna's performances. Rehman's performance earned her a Best Actress nomination at the same ceremony. The film was a moderate success at the box-office.

Khamoshi was shot in Calcutta and was based on the Bengali short story titled Nurse Mitra by noted Bengali writer, Ashutosh Mukherjee and is a remake of director Asit Sen's own Bengali film, Deep Jwele Jaai (1959), starring Suchitra Sen. The Bengali original proved to be a hit at the box office, especially at the urban centres. Impressed by the story line, producer Vuppunuthula Purushotham Reddy and director G. Ramineedu remade the Bengali film into Chivaraku Migiledi (1960), which was a blockbuster.

== Plot ==
Colonel Sahab, a World War II veteran doctor, is head of the psychiatry ward at a hospital. Nurse Radha working the same ward is heart-broken after a civilian patient, Dev Kumar, whom she cured, left the hospital. She had been unable to keep her heart separate from her professional work and had fallen in love with that patient. Arun Choudhary, a writer and poet enters as a patient, suffering from acute mania after being rejected by his lover, Sulekha, a singer. After refusing to take care of him initially, Radha later relents. While caring for Arun, she reminisces about her past and tells a story of how she took care of injured brave army soldiers when she was posted in Ladakh during the Sino-Indian war of 1962.

Gradually, Arun is cured but Nurse Radha, yet again is emotionally involved with her patient. Unable to deal with her complex feelings, Radha becomes emotionally deranged. Ironically she is admitted to the same room of the ward. Colonel Sahab regrets that he always saw a devoted nurse in her and didn't see the woman inside her. Arun promises to wait for her recovery.

== Cast ==
- Waheeda Rehman as Nurse Radha
- Rajesh Khanna as Arun Choudhary
- Dharmendra (special appearance) as Dev Kumar (Patient #24)
- Nazir Hussain as Dr. Colonel Saab
- Iftekhar as Doctor
- Lalita Pawar as Matron
- Deven Verma as Patient #22
- Anwar Hussain as Biharilal Gupta
- Snehlata as Sulekha, Arun's girlfriend

== Background ==
Director Asit Sen (not to be confused with the actor-comedian Asit Sen) acted in the original Bengali film Deep Jwele Jaai (1959) in a role which was essayed by Dharmendra in Khamoshi. The movie-goers did not recognise Asit Sen in the film, because it was a dark scene marked with the baritone voice of Hemant Kumar. The director revealed this in an interview in the 1990s. After his success in the off-beat films Mamta (1966) and Anokhi Raat (1968), Sen, wanting to make it big in Bombay as well, decided to remake his Bengali hit.

The lead actress of the film, Waheeda Rehman suggested the name of actor Rajesh Khanna to Sen, having been impressed by his work in Aakhri Khat (1966). She said that her own performance came "nowhere near that of Suchitra Sen in the original." She credited the director for helping her a lot during difficult scenes. Rehman said in an interview that she could not meet the standards set by Savitri in Chivaraku Migiledi (1960) for the character.

== Music ==
The music was composed by Hemant Kumar and lyrics were written by Gulzar.

1. "Woh Shaam Kuch Ajeeb Thi... Yeh Shaam Bhi Ajeeb Hai": Kishore Kumar
2. "Tum Pukaar Lo... Tumhara Intezaar Hai": Hemant Kumar
3. "Humne Dekhi Hai Un Aankhon Ki Mehekti Khushboo": Lata Mangeshkar
4. "Aaj Ki Raat Chiraagon": Aarti Mukherjee
5. "Dost Kahaan Koi Tumsa": Manna Dey

The song "Woh Shaam Kuch Ajeeb Thi" is set in raga Kalyan.

== Awards and nominations ==
18th Filmfare Awards

Won

- Best Cinematographer (B&W) – Kamal Bose

Nominated

- Best Actress – Waheeda Rehman
