= Panchatapa =

- Directed by: Asit Sen
- Screenplay by: Asit Sen
- Story by: Ashutosh Mukhopadhyay
- Produced by: Everest Cine Corporation Pvt. Ltd.
- Starring: Arundhati Devi; Asitbaran; Pahari Sanyal; Kamal Mitra
- Cinematography: Ajoy Mitra
- Edited by: Tarun Dutta
- Music by: Nirmal Bhattacharya; V. Balsara
- Distributed by: Janata Pictures & Theatres
- Release date: 12 April 1957
- Country: India
- Language: Bengali

Panchatapa is an Indian Bengali-language drama film directed by Asit Sen and based on the novel of the same name by Ashutosh Mukhopadhyay. The film was released on 12 April 1957 under the banner of Janata Pictures & Theatres Limited. Unfortunately the reel of the film has completely been lost.

== Plot ==
Somnath, A young engineer is working on the construction of the Panchet Dam. An wealthy woman Neela loves him. But he meets Santana in his workplace and falls in love with her. After an unfortunate blast at the construction site kills Santana. Somnath never marries again and devotes his life to the making of the Dam. The plot explores human relationships, love triangle and struggles of middle class Bengali family.

== Cast ==
- Asit Baran as Somnath
- Arundhati Devi
- Pahari Sanyal
- Kamal Mitra
- Chandrabati Devi
- Padma Devi
- Shukla Sen as Neela
- Sita Sengupta
- Prasanta Kumar
