= Mejo Bou (1955 film) =

- Directed by: Debnarayan Gupta
- Written by: Debnarayan Gupta
- Story by: Prabash Chandra Ghosh
- Produced by: Chalachhabi Limited
- Starring: Suchitra Sen; Bikash Roy; Pahari Sanyal; Jahor Roy
- Cinematography: Anil Gupta
- Edited by: Kamal Gangopadhyay
- Distributed by: Chitra Paribeshak Limited
- Release date: 30 September 1955
- Country: India
- Language: Bengali

Mejo Bou is a Bengali drama film directed by Debnarayan Gupta starred Suchitra Sen, Bikash Roy, Jahar Ganguly and Pahari Sanyal in pivotal roles. It was released on 30 September 1955 under the banner of Chitra Paribeshak Limited. It is the debut film of Bengali actress Aparna Sen.

== Cast ==
- Bikash Roy
- Suchitra Sen
- Jahar Ganguly
- Pahari Sanyal
- Anup Kumar
- Aparna Sen
- Molina Devi
- Jahor Roy
- Moni Srimani
- Suprabha Mukhopadhyay
- Renuka Ray
- Nitish Mukhopadhyay
