= Sujata (1959 film) =

- Directed by: Bimal Roy
- Written by: Nabendu Ghosh (screenplay); Subodh Ghosh (story); Paul Mahendra (dialogue)
- Produced by: Bimal Roy
- Starring: Nutan; Sunil Dutt; Shashikala
- Cinematography: Kamal Bose
- Edited by: Amit Bose
- Music by: S. D. Burman
- Release date: 20 March 1959
- Running time: 145 minutes
- Country: India
- Language: Hindi

Sujata is a 1959 Hindi-language drama film directed by Bimal Roy. It stars Nutan and Sunil Dutt in lead roles, supported by Shashikala, Lalita Pawar, Sulochana Latkar and Tarun Bose. Based on a Subodh Ghosh's Bengali short story of the same name, the film explored the situation of caste in India. The music is by S. D. Burman and the lyrics by Majrooh Sultanpuri. It was entered into the 1960 Cannes Film Festival.

== Plot ==
Sujata is a romance between a Brahmin young man, Adheer and an untouchable woman, Sujata. It's also a story of the intense emotional conflict a mother faces in fully accepting an adopted daughter. The film has Mahatma Gandhi's fight against untouchability and the myth of Chandalika in Hinduism as its subtexts, based on which it tries to criticize the practice of untouchability in India.

Brahmin couple, Upen and Charu bring up an orphaned child and name her Sujata. Although Upen is fond of the adopted child, his wife Charu and aunt (Adheer's mother) can never fully embrace Sujata because she was born in an untouchable's family. They keep hinting to Sujata at times that she doesn't belong amongst Brahmins. Adheer falls in love with Sujata but Charu and Aunt want Adheer to marry Charu's real daughter Rama. Sujata also admires Adheer but finding her reality of being untouchable by birth feels uncomfortable. One day, Upen's wife falls down the stairs and is rushed to the hospital. The doctors tell the family that to save Charu, they need the rare group of blood. Only Sujata's blood matches and she willingly donates blood. When Charu become aware that her life was saved by Sujata, she realizes her mistake and accepts her as her daughter. Sujata and Adheer are then married happily with everyone's blessings.

== Cast ==
- Nutan as Sujata
- Sunil Dutt as Adhir
- Shashikala as Rama Chowdhury
- Lalita Pawar as Giribala
- Tarun Bose as Upendranath Chowdhury
- Sulochana Latkar as Charumati Chowdhury
- Asit Sen as Pandit Bhavani Shankar Sharma
- Cuckoo Moray as Rama's friend singing the song "Tum Jeeoo Hazaaron Saal"

== Awards ==
- Golden Palm - Cannes Film Festival - Nominated

7th Filmfare Awards:

- Filmfare Best Movie Award - Bimal Roy - Won
- Filmfare Best Director Award - Bimal Roy - Won
- Filmfare Best Actress Award - Nutan - Won
- Filmfare Best Story Award - Subodh Ghosh - Won
- National Film Awards (1959) All India Certificate of Merit for the Third Best Feature Film

== Soundtrack ==
Song	Singer	Raga
"Suno Mere Bandhu Re"	S. D. Burman	
"Jalte Hain Jiske Liye"	Talat Mahmood	
"Kali Ghata Chhaye"	Asha Bhosle	Pilu
"Tum Jeeo Hazaaron Saal"	Asha Bhosle	
"Bachpan Ke Din Bhi Kya Din The, Udte Phirte Titli Banke"	Asha Bhosle, Geeta Dutt	
"Nanhi Kali Sone Chali"	Geeta Dutt	
"Wah Bhai Wah"	Mohammed Rafi	
