= Deep Jweley Jaai =

1959 Bengali-language film by Asit Sen

Deep Jwélé Jaai
- DVD cover
- Directed by: Asit Sen
- Written by: Ashutosh Mukherjee
- Produced by: Rakhal Saha
- Starring: Suchitra Sen; Anil Chatterjee; Vasant Choudhury
- Cinematography: Anil Gupta
- Music by: Hemanta Mukherjee
- Release date: 1959
- Running time: 132 minutes
- Country: India
- Language: Bengali

Ei raat tomar amar - Bengali movie song from Deep Jwele Jai (1959) (This night is yours and mine)
Lyricist Gauriprasanna Mazumder, composer and singer Hemanta Mukherjee

Deep Jwele Jaai (transl. To light a lamp) is a 1959 Indian Bengali-language film directed by Asit Sen. The film is based on a Bengali short story titled Nurse Mitra by Ashutosh Mukherjee. It was remade in Hindi in 1969 by Sen himself as Khamoshi. Before that it had been remade in Telugu in 1960 as Chivaraku Migiledi. The 1984 Kannada movie "Asha Kirana" starring Shankar Nag has a similar storyline. The song "Ei Raat Tomar Amar" from the film became a hit.

== Plot ==
This is a story of a nurse in a psychiatric hospital, played by Suchitra Sen. Sen's character is part of a team exploring new therapy for patients who have suffered from emotional trauma. The approach taken by the team is to offer these individuals an emotional resort, which is where Sen plays her part. Her role is to act as a friend and a lover of the patient, but at the same time, refrain from any emotional involvement on her own part as her role is purely that of a nurse who is helping the patient recover. She has to repeatedly break the emotional attachments that she experiences because as a nurse, she is part of therapy.

The movie looks at the neglected emotional trauma of this nurse who is used merely as a tool in the whole process of therapy. The movie ends by showing that the Sen is being admitted to the same ward where she used to be a nurse. The last words in the movie are uttered by Sen, who whispers out "I wasn't acting, I couldn't" (in English) indicating that she indeed fell in love with her patient. Also cast among others, were Pahari Sanyal, who plays a veteran doctor eager to explore new grounds, but hesitant of the human costs. Basanta Chowdhury plays as an artist and a lover-scorned.

The music was directed by Hemanta Mukherjee, and one of the songs, "Ei Raat Tomar Amar" (This night's just for you and me) has come to be regarded as one of the greatest and sensuous love song ever sung in Bengali.

== Cast ==
- Suchitra Sen as Radha
- Basanta Choudhury as Tapash
- Pahari Sanyal as Psychiatrist
- Tulsi Chakraborty
- Anil Chatterjee as Patient at mental asylum
- Chandrabati Devi as Matron
- Shyam Laha
- Namita Sinha
- Kajari Guha
- Dilip Choudhury

== Soundtrack ==
All lyrics are written by Gauriprasanna Mazumder; all music is composed by Hemanta Mukherjee.

Songs
No.	Title	Playback	Length
1.	"Ei Raat Tomar Amar"	Hemanta Mukherjee	1:55
2.	"Emon Bondhu Aar Ke Aache"	Manna Dey	2:35
3.	"Aar Jeno Nei Kono Bhabna"	Lata Mangeshkar	2:49
Total length:			7:19

== Remakes ==
The film turned out to be a big hit, especially in the urban centres. Impressed by the storyline, producer Vuppunuthula Purushotham Reddy and director Gutha Ramineedu remade the Bengali film into Chivaraku Migiledi in Telugu starring Savitri which flopped at the box office though. The director Asit Sen would later remake the film in Hindi as Khamoshi (Silence) (1969), starring Waheeda Rehman, Rajesh Khanna, and Dharmendra in a guest role.

In 1986, Priyadarshan drew inspiration from the English novel One Flew Over the Cuckoo's Nest and the above 3 films and made the Malayalam film Thalavattam. It was remade in Hindi as Kyon Ki in 2005 starring Salman Khan, Kareena Kapoor, Rimi Sen, Jackie Shroff, and Om Puri.
