= Jannatul Ferdous (politician) =

Bangladeshi politician

Member of Parliament for Reserved Women's Seat-5
- In office 14 July 1996 – 13 July 2001

Personal details
- Born: c. 1938
- Died: 1 February 2012 (aged 74)
- Party: Bangladesh Awami League
- Spouse: Amjad Hossain

Jannatul Ferdous (c. 1938 – 1 February 2012) was a Bangladeshi teacher and politician from Pabna belonging to the Bangladesh Awami League. She was a member of the Jatiya Sangsad.

== Biography ==
Ferdous was an assistant teacher of Pabna Government Girls' High School. Later, she joined Pabna Government Women's College and worked there from 1974 to 1995. She was elected as a member of the Jatiya Sangsad from Reserved Women's Seat-5 in the June 1996 Bangladeshi general election.

Ferdous was married to Amjad Hossain. He was a member of the Jatiya Sangsad too. They had two daughters and one son.

Ferdous died on 1 February 2012 at the age of 74.
