= Maa Aur Mamta =

1970 film by Asit Sen

- Theatrical release poster
- Directed by: Asit Sen
- Written by: Sarshar Sailani (dialogues)
- Screenplay by: Mohan Bali
- Story by: Mohan Bali
- Produced by: Baldev Pushkarna; M. M. Malhotra
- Starring: Ashok Kumar; Nutan; Jeetendra; Mumtaz; Nirupa Roy
- Cinematography: V. Durga Prasad
- Edited by: Tarun Dutta
- Music by: Laxmikant–Pyarelal
- Production company: Suchitra Kala Mandir
- Release date: 24 April 1970
- Running time: 149 minutes
- Country: India
- Language: Hindi

Maa Aur Mamta (transl. Mother and Affection) is a 1970 Indian Hindi-language drama film, produced by Baldev Pushkarna and M.M. Malhotra under the Suchitra Kala Mandir banner and directed by Asit Sen. It stars Ashok Kumar, Nutan, Jeetendra, Mumtaz, Nirupa Roy and music was composed by Laxmikant–Pyarelal.

== Plot ==
Maya, a poor girl, is the daughter of a "chaprasi" named Gopal who works for a kind-hearted Catholic priest, Father Henry. One night, while her father is dying, there is a knock on the door. Maya opens it, only to find Father Henry rushing in with a baby in arms. He gives the child in Maya's care and begs her to guard the child until he returns to claim it. Maya's father dies. Father Henry disappears, and Maya is left literally "holding the baby." The local panchayat, believing the worst, drive her away. Coming to Bombay, Maya and the child, whom she has named Ram, find shelter in the home of a good-hearted taxi-driver named Cassim. Years pass and Ram grows up into a fine and handsome young man, a college-going student. In time, Cassam gives up taxi-driving to become a chauffeur in the employment of Mr. Williams (Ashok Kumar), a wealthy Catholic businessman. Cassim learns that Mrs. Williams is suffering from a nervous breakdown because she had a son who was spirited away when he was just born, and that child was not found again. Taking pity on Mrs. Williams' condition, Cassim suggests Maya to take up a job in the Williams household as a nurse to the lady. Here, Maya finds that the Williams have got an adopted son Victor. This boy is actually the son of Mr. Williams brother Mr. Peter and Mrs. Peter. Both Ram and Victor study at the same college and both of them are claimants for the affections of Mary, a rich only daughter. Since Mary loves Ram and not Victor, the latter is always taunting Ram about his unknown parentage. He says, "Your mother is a Hindu and your grandfather a Muslim but where is your father?". Events take a dramatic turn when Maya learns the whole story of the disappearance of the Williams real child. She fears that Ram may be snatched away from her at any moment. Rams love, however, is steady as a rock. Even Mary's love cannot make him turn away from his mother Maya. Mary's father wants Ram to get converted before marrying Mary, but Ram refuses, saying "My religion is my mother. I cannot change either." Finally, both Mr. and Mrs. Williams learn the truth. And then fate makes everybody's footsteps converge towards the home of the poor but good-hearted Muslim taxi-driver, where a great drama of emotional turmoil and drama reaches its culmination.

== Cast ==
- Ashok Kumar as William
- Nutan as Maya
- Jeetendra as Ram
- Mumtaz as Mary
- Nirupa Roy as Polly
- Sujit Kumar as Sundar
- Rehman as Father Henry
- Jayant as Qasim
- Shabnam as Rosie
- Roopesh Kumar as Victor
- Birbal as Karan
- Shivraj as Gopal
- Leela Mishra as Maya's aunty
- Brahm Bhardwaj as Mary's dad
- Keshto Mukherjee as Drunkard
- Karan Dewan as Peter

== Soundtrack ==
Song	Singer
"Koi Na Jane"	Manna Dey
"Baat Yeh Anokhi"	Lata Mangeshkar
"Rut Bekarar Hai, Sham-E-Bahar Hai"	Lata Mangeshkar, Mohammed Rafi
"Apne Nainon Ko Samjha Le"	Lata Mangeshkar, Mohammed Rafi
"Tere Pyar Ne Yeh Kaam Kiya"	Asha Bhosle, Mohammed Rafi
