= Bemisal =

- Movie poster
- Directed by: Hrishikesh Mukherjee
- Written by: Sachin Bhowmick; Ashutosh Mukherjee (Story)
- Based on: Ami, Shey O Shakha by Mangal Chakravarty
- Produced by: Debesh Gosh
- Starring: Amitabh Bachchan; Raakhee; Vinod Mehra
- Cinematography: Jaywant Pathare
- Music by: R.D. Burman
- Release date: 5 March 1982
- Country: India
- Language: Hindi

Bemisal (English: unparalleled, or, unprecedented) is a 1982 drama film produced by Debesh Gosh and directed by Hrishikesh Mukherjee. It is a remake of Bengali film Ami, Shey O Shakha (1975) starring Uttam Kumar, which was also based on the Bengali story of the same name by Ashutosh Mukherjee.The film stars Amitabh Bachchan, Vinod Mehra, Raakhee, Deven Verma, Aruna Irani and Om Shivpuri. The music was by R.D. Burman.

When a deprived boy, brought up in a privileged family and indebted for virtually everything he has, lands in a perplexing situation, life seems unfair to him. There are very few who actually appreciate benevolence showered on them. When it comes to repay such debt, many of us try to find excuses to avoid the difficult situation. But the protagonist of this movie is a noble individual, an ideal hero, who knows that everything he has in life, is owed to a family and when he finds himself in a situation where he has to give up his love and profession, he doesn't look back.

== Plot ==
Dr. Sudhir Roy and Dr. Prashant Chaturvedi meet Ms. Kavita Goel on a holiday and start meeting her regularly. Though he himself was interested in Kavita, Sudhir recommends Prashant to her for marriage. When she asks why he himself can't marry her, Sudhir narrates his flashback.

Sudhir was the second son of a poor school teacher and hopes that his big brother would get a job and provide for them. But when his big brother becomes mentally ill and his father dies, he resorts to petty thieving. When police catch him, the Magistrate recognizes him and adopts him. Sudhir grows up along with the magistrate's son Prashant and receives same education and becomes a pediatrician. Now he tells her that he can't marry her on medical grounds as his brother was a psychiatric patient and he has a criminal background.

Kavita and Prashant marry and Prashant leaves for America for higher studies, while Sudhir stays in Bombay to take care of the magistrate and Kavita. After coming back, Prashant starts a medical practice and charges more money from patients, especially to do illegal abortions. Sudhir tries to reason with him, but he wouldn't listen. One day, Prashant's patient dies during an abortion and he gets arrested. Sudhir tells police that he was the actual culprit and changes all hospital records to prove that. In return, he takes the word of Prashant and Kavita to use medical profession to serve people, not to earn money. They give him their word and do exactly the same. Sudhir gets a nine-year sentence and loses his medical registration.

After nine years, Kavita and Prashant welcome Sudhir from jail along with their son.

== Cast ==
- Amitabh Bachchan in dual roles
  - Dr. Sudhir Roy
  - Adhir Roy, Sudhir's brother
- Vinod Mehra as Dr. Prashant Chaturvedi
- Raakhee as Kavita Chaturvedi (née Goel)
- A.K. Hangal as Dr. Ramnarayan Goel
- Om Shivpuri as Magistrate Chaturvedi
- Deven Verma as Hiralal
- Sheetal as Ruby Dutt
- Anjan Srivastav as doctor
- Goga Kapoor as Ruby's father
- Aruna Irani as Nandani Malhotra
- Asit Sen as Dr. Agarwal
- Pratima Devi as Dr. Goel's sister
- Master Mayur as young Sudhir
- Baby Khushbu as Meena
- Master Vikas as boy child patient
- Harindranath Chattopadhyay as party guest

== Production ==
=== Filming ===
Some scenes of Bemisaal were shot in Kashmir Valley like in Sonmarg, Pahalgam. Bemisaal was one of the last films to be shot in Kashmir before the advent of militancy.

== Awards ==
30th Filmfare Awards:

Won

- Best Cinematography – Jaywant Pathare

Nominated

- Best Actor – Amitabh Bachchan
- Best Supporting Actor – Vinod Mehra

== Soundtrack ==
The Soundtrack of the film was composed by R. D. Burman and the lyrics were penned by Anand Bakshi. Singers like Kishore Kumar, Lata Mangeshkar and Suresh Wadkar lent their voices for the songs of the film. The soundtrack has 4 songs and 2 instrumental versions. The songs are even popular today with the masses. The soundtrack was released in 1982. The song "Ae Ri Pawan" is retuned from Burman's Bengali composition "Bendechi Beena" sung by Parween Sultana, from Bengali film Kalankini Kankabati (1981).

#	Title	Singer(s)
1	"Kitni Khoobsoorat Yeh Tasveer Hai Ye Kashmir Hai"	Kishore Kumar, Lata Mangeshkar, Suresh Wadkar
2	"Ae Ri Pawan"	Lata Mangeshkar
3	"Khafa Hoon Khafa Hoon"	Kishore Kumar
4	"Ek Roz Main Tadapkar"	Kishore Kumar
5	Music (Bemisal)	Instrumental
6	"Ae Ri Pawan" (Instrumental Version)	Instrumental
