= Sarhad (1960 film) =

- Directed by: Shankar Mukherjee
- Starring: Dev Anand; Suchitra Sen
- Release date: 1960
- Country: India
- Language: Hindi
- Box office: ₹60 lakh

Sarhad is a 1960 Indian Hindi-language film directed by Shankar Mukherjee. The film stars Dev Anand as Amar, a reclusive and bitter jungle tribal landlord who is reformed through his love for Mala, played by Suchitra Sen. It was one of Sen's seven Hindi films.

Sarhad was the twentieth highest-grossing Indian film of 1960. It had minimal returns at the box office, with an estimated gross of ₹60 lakh.

== Cast ==
- Dev Anand as Amar
- Suchitra Sen as Mala
