= Asit Sen =

Asit Sen may refer to:

- Asit Sen (actor) (1917–1993), Indian Hindi film actor and comedian
- Asit Sen (director) (1922–2001), Indian film director who directed several Hindi and Bengali films
- Asit Sen (activist), Indian communist activist in West Bengal, founder of the Revolutionary Communist Unity Centre (Marxist–Leninist)
