= Safar (1970 film) =

1970 Indian film by Asit Sen

- Film poster
- Directed by: Asit Sen
- Screenplay by: Asit Sen
- Story by: Ashutosh Mukherjee
- Based on: Chalachal (1956 film)
- Produced by: Mushir-Riaz
- Starring: Ashok Kumar; Sharmila Tagore; Rajesh Khanna; Feroz Khan
- Cinematography: Kamal Bose
- Edited by: Tarun Dutta
- Music by: Kalyanji Anandji; Indeevar (lyrics)
- Distributed by: M.R. Productions
- Release date: 1 October 1970
- Running time: 140 min
- Country: India
- Language: Hindi
- Box office: ₹3 crore (equivalent to ₹148 crore or US$15 million in 2023)

Safar (transl. Journey) is a 1970 Indian Hindi romantic drama film produced by the Mushir-Riaz duo and directed by Asit Sen, based on the novel named Chalachal by Bengali writer Ashutosh Mukherjee. The film stars Ashok Kumar, Sharmila Tagore, Rajesh Khanna and Feroz Khan in lead roles. The film became one of the top grossing films of the year. It won a Filmfare Awards and four Bengal Film Journalists' Association Awards. Asit Sen remade the 1956 Bengali film Chalachal, which was directed by him, in Hindi as Safar (1970). As per review by critics, Safar was carried more than ably by Khanna's immense charm at the peak of his popularity. This film is counted among the 17 consecutive hit films of Rajesh Khanna between 1969 and 1971, by adding the two-hero films Maryada and Andaz to the 15 consecutive solo hits he gave from 1969 to 1971.

The music of the film was a phenomenal hit during the 1970s and remains so.

== Plot ==
The movie starts with the desperate attempt of surgeon Dr. Neela (Sharmila Tagore) to save a patient, whom she knew was not going to survive. She works under the guidance of Dr. Chandra (Ashok Kumar), who tells her that however hard doctors might try, sometimes a patient will not survive. The story drifts into a flashback. Neela meets Avinash (Rajesh Khanna) at medical college and after an initial misunderstanding, grows close to him. Avinash is a poor man who works while attending medical college. He is a skilled commercial artist too, and Neela finds out that most of the portraits he paints are of her. Though Avinash admires Neela very much, he never talks about love or marriage. Everyone thinks that it is because of his financial status, but it is later revealed that it is because he is suffering from terminal cancer.

Neela, due to financial troubles, starts working as a tutor where she meets her student's (Mahesh Kothare) elder brother, businessman Shekhar Kapoor (Feroz Khan). Shekhar falls in love with her. He meets her elder brother Kalidas (I. S. Johar) to ask for her hand in marriage. Kalidas instead directs him to Avinash saying that Neela would heed his counsel. Shekhar is puzzled but meets Avinash nevertheless, who warmly approves of him and recommends him to Neela. Neela is shocked to learn that Avinash has blood cancer and cannot marry her. After an intense scene where he persuades her to settle down with the "wealthy, healthy" Shekhar, she finally agrees to marry Shekhar. The couple are initially happy together, but Shekhar always feels that Neela does not love him as much as he loves her. Facing losses in business, he desires Neela's sympathy but does not reveal his troubles to her. His insecurity prompts him to make his younger brother Montu stalk Neela everywhere she goes, fuelling marital discord.

Moreover, Neela regularly visits her brother's house where Avinash was a frequent visitor. She also visits Avinash's place. Shekhar slowly grows suspicious of Neela and Avinash and asks his younger brother to spy on her. Later he finds a "love letter", which was once written by Avinash as he imitated Neela's handwriting just for fun. However, in a grave misunderstanding, Shekhar thinks that Neela has indeed written that love note to Avinash and becomes devastated. He wants to set her free from their marriage, and ends up committing suicide. Police suspect that Neela killed him and arrest her for murder.

In a surprising twist during the trial, Shekhar's mother Mrs. Kapoor (Nadira), who was always hostile to her daughter-in-law, testifies in favour of her unblemished character. The court acquits Neela. Later it is revealed that Avinash left to get away from their marital lives not knowing that Shekhar had committed suicide. He comes back in the final stage of his disease and dies in Dr. Chandra's hospital. Heart-broken and devastated, Neela has lost the will to live, but Dr. Chandra consoles her and takes her under his wing to make her a great surgeon like him. The film ends with Neela sending her brother-in-law Montu (Mahesh Kothare) abroad for studies and dedicating her life to the medical profession.

== Cast ==
- Ashok Kumar as Dr. Chandra
- Sharmila Tagore as Dr. Neela Kapoor
- Rajesh Khanna as Avinash
- Feroz Khan as Shekhar Kapoor
- I. S. Johar as Kalidas
- Aruna Irani as Laxmi, wife of Kalidas
- Nadira as Mrs. Kapoor
- Nandita Thakur as singer at studio
- Mahesh Kothare as Montu Kapoor

== Crew ==
- Producer: Mohammad Riaz
- Director: Asit Sen
- Story: Ashutosh Mukherjee
- Screenplay: Asit Sen
- Dialogues: Inder Raj Anand
- Lyrics: Indeevar
- Music: Kalyanji Anandji
- Choreography: Kamal Bose
- Editing: Tarun Dutta
- Art direction: Sudhendu Roy
- Costume Design: Shalini Shah

== Reception and awards ==
Safar became the tenth highest-grossing film of the year in India. In a retrospective review, Rediff.com wrote: "Safar is a story of ordinary people grappling with staggering challenges and compromises. But in this refreshingly non-melodramatic fare, a murmur of protest, an escaped sob and a half-concealed smirk are the only emotional luxuries its characters afford themselves in the inexplicable journey of life, the eponymous safar of the title."

Safar received two nominations at the annual Filmfare Awards and won one award. Asit Sen received his first Best Director award (he was previously nominated in this category for Mamta in 1967), though the film was not nominated for the Best Film award. Sharmila Tagore received her second Best Actress nomination (she won the previous year for Aradhana). Awards and nominations are listed below:

- Won, Filmfare Best Director Award - Asit Sen
- Nominated, Filmfare Best Actress Award - Sharmila Tagore

The Bengal Film Journalists' Association acknowledged Safar as the eighth best Indian film of 1970, and gave it three more awards:

- BFJA Awards, Best Screenplay (Hindi) - Asit Sen
- BFJA Awards, Best Dialogue (Hindi) - Inder Raj Anand
- BFJA Awards, Best Editing (Hindi) - Tarun Dutta

Tagore won the Madras Film Fans Associations' Award for Best Actress.

== Music ==
Safar

Studio album by Kalyanji Anandji
- Released: 1970 (India)
- Genre: Feature film soundtrack
- Label: Saregama
- Producer: Kalyanji Anandji

Kalyanji Anandji chronology
Geet (1970)	Safar (1970)	Holi Ayee Re (1970)

The soundtrack of the film contains 5 songs. The music is composed by Kalyanji Anandji, with lyrics authored by Indeevar.

#	Song	Singer(s)	Raga
1.	"Zindagi Ka Safar"	Kishore Kumar	
2.	"Jeevan Se Bhari"	Kishore Kumar	Malgunji
3.	"Hum The Jinke Sahare"	Lata Mangeshkar	
4.	"Jo Tumko Ho Pasand"	Mukesh	
5.	"Nadiya Chale Chale Re"	Manna Dey	
