= Chaitali (film) =

1975 film

- Theatrical release poster
- Directed by: Hrishikesh Mukherjee
- Screenplay by: Bimal Dutt
- Dialogues by: Biren Tripathy
- Story by: Ashapurna Devi
- Produced by: Manobina Roy
- Starring: Dharmendra; Saira Banu; Pradeep Kumar
- Cinematography: Chuni Lal Chatterjee
- Edited by: Khan Zaman Khan
- Music by: Laxmikant–Pyarelal
- Production company: Bimal Roy Productions
- Release date: 26 September 1975
- Country: India
- Language: Hindi

Chaitali is a 1975 Hindi drama film, directed by Hrishikesh Mukherjee, produced by Manobina Roy, and written by Ashapurna Devi. The film, released in 1975, was produced under Bimal Roy Productions. It is based on the Bengali novel of the same name by Ashapoorna Devi. The music of the film was composed by the duo Laxmikant–Pyarelal. The film stars Dharmendra and Saira Banu in the lead roles.

== Plot ==
Manish, a college professor, takes in Chaitali, a thief, and offers to support her to go straight. Chaitali lies that she is a widow when she isn't even married since she is the daughter of a fugitive and is brought up in a kotha (dancing house) by her protective stepmother. To hide her background, she lies, and that leads to more lies. Manish's brother Avinash is a lawyer practicing from home, and his bedridden wife Prabha accuses Chaitali of stealing a valuable necklace to which Chaitali quickly confesses. Before that, Chaitali, Manish and his mother had visited their family Guru for his guidance where Chaitali had confessed her life story to Manish. Out on the streets, she takes up dancing, which Manish misinterprets as her slap on his generosity. She decides to return money for the stolen necklace with earnings from her dancing but this is interpreted as arrogance and she is thrown out of the house. Soon, Avinash tells the truth to Manish as to why Chaitali confessed to stealing the jewellery.

== Cast ==
- Dharmendra as Manish
- Saira Banu as Chaitali
- Abhi Bhattacharya as Chaitali's father
- Shyama as Chaitali's stepmother
- Pradeep Kumar as Avinash
- Bindu as Prabha
- Durga Khote as Manish's mother

== Soundtrack ==
The film’s music was composed by Laxmikant–Pyarelal and the lyrics of the songs were penned by Anand Bakshi.

#	Title	Singer(s)
1	"Dharti Ambar Nind Se Jaage"	Manna Dey, Lata Mangeshkar
2	"Mehbooba Naam Hai Mera"	Lata Mangeshkar
3	"Sa Ni Dha Pa Ma Ga Ni Dha"	Lata Mangeshkar
