= Aro Ekjan =

Bengali film

Aro Ekjan is a Bengali-language action drama film directed by Srijan based on the same name novel of Ashutosh Mukhopadhyay. The film was released on 4 April 1980 under the banner of Baba Taraknath Chitramandir.

== Plot ==
Sharmila, a young doctor falls in love with a poor car mechanic Mohan. Sharmila's father is against their marriage. Sharmila married to Mohan but soon after Mohan dies in a train accident. From the place of accident Sharmila picks up a baby beside Mohan's body. She brings the baby and lives in Darjeeling. In a rainy night Sharmila meets major Dilip and she later discovers that the baby is actually Dilip's child.

== Cast ==
- Uttam Kumar as Major Dilip
- Sumitra Mukherjee as Sharmila
- Samit Bhanja as Mohan
- Kamal Mitra as Sharmila's father
- Chhaya Devi
- Padma Devi
- Gita Karmakar
