= Anupama (1966 film) =

- Theatrical release poster
- Directed by: Hrishikesh Mukherjee
- Screenplay by: Bimal Dutta; D. N. Mukherjee
- Dialogues by: Rajinder Singh Bedi
- Story by: Hrishikesh Mukherjee
- Produced by: L. B. Lachman
- Starring: Dharmendra; Sharmila Tagore; Shashikala; Deven Verma
- Cinematography: Jaywant Pathare
- Edited by: Das Dhaimade
- Music by: Hemant Kumar
- Production company: LB Films
- Release date: 1966
- Running time: 148 minutes
- Country: India
- Language: Hindi

Anupama (transl. Incomparable) is a 1966 Hindi film directed by Hrishikesh Mukherjee featuring Dharmendra, Sharmila Tagore, Shashikala, Deven Verma and Surekha Pandit. At the 1966 National Film Awards, the film won the National Film Award for Best Feature Film in Hindi.

== Plot ==
Mohan Sharma (Tarun Bose), a successful businessman in Mumbai, marries Aruna (Surekha Pandit) late in his life. His happy marriage ends when Aruna dies during childbirth, leaving behind a young daughter, Uma (Sharmila Tagore). Mohan cannot bear to see his daughter unless he is drunk, as she is a painful reminder of his late wife. Naturally, Uma grows up all by herself and becomes highly introverted and depressed. As time passes, Mohan's health starts failing due to overwork and alcoholism; doctors suggest a change of weather to a hill station, Mahabaleshwar.

Meanwhile, Arun Mehta (Deven Verma), the son of Mohan's friend Hari Mehta, is set to marry Uma, but prefers Annie (Shashikala) instead. He returns home after studying engineering abroad for five years, and joins them along with his friend, Ashok (Dharmendra), a writer and teacher who due to his straightforward nature most of the time remains jobless. Things change when young Ashok enters Uma's life. Uma falls in love with Ashok but she cannot do anything to jeopardize the already fragile relationship between her and her father who dislikes Ashok. Finally, Uma's father agrees and Uma leaves with Ashok to his village.

== Cast ==
- Dharmendra as Ashok
- Sharmila Tagore as Uma Sharma
- Shashikala as Anita "Annie" Bakshi
- Tarun Bose as Mohan Sharma
- Dulari as Sarla
- David as Moses
- Deven Verma as Arun Mehta
- Naina as Gauri
- Durga Khote as Ashok's Mother
- Surekha Pandit as Aruna Sharma
- Brahm Bhardwaj as Suresh Bakshi

== Production ==
According to Mukherjee, the film was based on his cousin. "My aunt died during childbirth, my uncle became an alcoholic, and he couldn't stand his daughter. For Anupama’s relationship with the poet who rescues her, I used my imagination," he told The Indian Express. His decision to cast Tagore as the protagonist was also frowned upon. Tagore, who was working on An Evening in Paris at the time, had received backlash for wearing a one-piece swimsuit for the film. She was the first Bollywood actress to have done so. "There were howls of protests when I signed [Tagore]. I was told to take Nutan instead, I said, 'Look, Rinku [Tagore] has the expressive eyes of my Anupama.' I had to instruct her very closely. She didn’t know what she was doing. When she saw the rush print, Rinku gave me a kiss", said Mukherjee. The song Kuch Dil Ne Kaha from the film was shot in Mahabaleshwar, for which Tagore and her co-star Dharmendra had to report on set at five in the morning. Majority of Anupama was shot at Mohan Studios in Mumbai, Maharashtra.

== Soundtrack ==
The music for the Anupama was composed by Hemant Kumar and the lyrics were penned by Kaifi Azmi. The songs were sung by Lata Mangeshkar, Asha Bhosle and Hemant Kumar.

| Song | Singer | Raga |
|---|---|---|
| "Dheere Dheere Machal Ae Dil-e-Beqarar Koi Aata Hai..." | Lata Mangeshkar | Khamaj |
| "Kuchh Dil Ne Kaha Kuch Bhi Nahin..." | Lata Mangeshkar | Bhimpalasi |
| "Bheegi Bheegi Faza San San San Ke Jiya..." | Asha Bhosle | |
| "Kyon Mujhe Itni Khushi Dedi Ke Ghabrata Hai Dil..." | Asha Bhosle | |
| "Ya Dil Ki Suno Duniyawalo Ya Mujhko Abhi Chup Rehne Do..." | Hemant Kumar | Pilu (raga) |

== Release ==
Anupama was released on 21 January 1966 and it did an above average business at the box office.

== Awards ==
Anupama received five nominations at the 1967 Filmfare Awards for Best Film, and Jaywant Pathare won the Filmfare Award for Best Cinematography. The film also won the National Film Award for Best Feature Film in Hindi at the 1966 National Film Awards.
