= Filmfare Award for Best Cinematography =

Indian film awards for cinematography

Filmfare Award for Best cinematography
- Awarded for: Best Performance by a Cinematographer
- Country: India
- Presented by: Filmfare
- First award: Taru Dutt, Boot Polish (1955)
- Currently held by: Rafey Mehmood, Kill (2025)
- Website: Filmfare Awards

The Filmfare Best Cinematography Award is given by the Filmfare magazine as part of its annual Filmfare Awards for Hindi films.

The category was first awarded in 1954.

== Superlatives ==
Wins	Cinematographer
5	Kamal Bose
4	Jal Mistry, Radhu Karmakar
3	Santosh Sivan, Binod Pradhan
2	V. K. Murthy, Krishnarao Vashirda, Faredoon Irani, Fali Mistry, Jaywant Pathare_{,} Govind Nihalani, Manmohan Singh, Ravi K. Chandran, Avik Mukhopadhyay, Sudeep Chatterjee

Kamal Bose, Radhu Karmakar, Fali Mistry and Jaywant Pathare have won the award in both the Black & White and Color categories.

== List ==
Year	Cinematographer	Film
2025	Rafey Mehmood	Kill
2024	Avinash Arun	Three of Us
2023	Sudeep Chatterjee	Gangubai Kathiawadi
2022	Avik Mukhopadhyay	Sardar Udham
2021	Avik Mukhopadhyay	Gulabo Sitabo
2020	Jay Oza	Gully Boy
2019	Pankaj Kumar	Tumbbad
2018	Sirsha Ray	A Death in the Gunj
2017	Mitesh Mirchandani	Neerja
2016	Manu Anand	Dum Laga Ke Haisha
2015	Bobby Singh (posthumously) and Siddharth Diwan	Queen
2014	Kamaljeet Negi	Madras Cafe
2013	Satyajit Pande (Setu)	Kahaani
2012	Carlos Catalan	Zindagi Na Milegi Dobara
2011	Mahendra J. Shetty	Udaan
2010	Rajeev Ravi	Dev.D
2009	Jason West	Rock On!!
2008	Sudeep Chatterjee	Chak De India
2007	Binod Pradhan	Rang De Basanti
2006	Ravi K. Chandran	Black
2005	Christopher Popp	Lakshya
2004	Aseem Bajaj	Chameli
2003	Binod Pradhan	Devdas
2002	Santosh Sivan	Asoka
2001	Bashir Ali	Refugee
2000	Kabir Lal	Taal
1999	Santosh Sivan	Dil Se..
1997	Ashok Mehta	Bandit Queen
1996	Santosh Sivan	Barsaat
1995	Binod Pradhan	1942: A Love Story
1994	Manmohan Singh	Darr
1993	S. Kumar	Muskurahat
1992	Radhu Karmakar	Henna
1991	Rajan Kothari	Ghayal
1990	Manmohan Singh	Chandni
1989	Kiran Deohans	Qayamat Se Qayamat Tak
1988	No Ceremony Held	No Ceremony Held
1987	No Ceremony Held	No Ceremony Held
1986	S. M. Anwar	Saagar
1985	P. L. Raj	Jaag Utha Insaan
1984	Govind Nihalani	Vijeta
1983	Jaywant Pathare	Bemisal
1982	Jal Mistry	Kudrat
1981	S. M. Anwar	Shaan
1980	Govind Nihalani	Junoon
1979	Radhu Karmakar	Satyam Shivam Sundaram
1978	Munir Khan	Hum Kisise Kum Naheen
1977	Fali Mistry	Fakira
1976	Kamal Bose	Dharmatma
1975	A. Vincent	Prem Nagar
1974	Jal Mistry	Jheel Ke Us Paar
1973	K Vaikunth	Seeta Aur Geeta
1972	Kamal Bose; Radhu Karmakar	Dastak (B&W); Mera Naam Joker (Color)
1971	Kamal Bose; Jal Mistry	Khamoshi (B&W); Heer Raanjha (Color)
1970	Kamal Bose; Faredoon Irani	Anokhi Raat (B&W); Duniya (Color)
1969	Nariman A. Irani; G. Singh	Saraswatichandra (B&W); Aankhen (Color)
1968	Jal Mistry; M. N. Malhotra	Baharon Ke Sapne (B&W); Humraaz (Color)
1967	Jaywant Pathare; Fali Mistry	Anupama (B&W); Guide (Color)
1966	S. Ramachandra; Dharam Chopra	Yaadein (B&W); Waqt (Color)
1965	K. H. Kapadia; Krishnarao Vashirda	Woh Kaun Thi? (B&W); Geet Gaya Patharon Ne (Color)
1964	Kamal Bose; Krishnarao Vashirda	Bandini (B&W); Sehra (Color)
1963	V. K. Murthy	Sahib Bibi Aur Ghulam (B&W)
1962	V. Balasaheb	Ganga Jamuna (Color)
1961	R. D. Mathur	Mughal-e-Azam (B&W)
1960	V. K. Murthy	Kaagaz Ke Phool (B&W)
1959	Dilip Gupta	Madhumati (B&W)
1958	Faredoon A. Irani	Mother India (Color)
1957	Radhu Karmakar	Shree 420 (B&W)
1956	Dwarka Divecha	Yasmin (B&W)
1955	Tara Dutt	Boot Polish (B&W)

== See also ==
- Filmfare Awards
- Bollywood
- Cinema of India
