= Anokha Daan =

- Directed by: Asit Sen
- Written by: Inder Raj Anand
- Produced by: L. B. Thakur
- Starring: Tarun Bose; Anil Dhawan; Kabir Bedi; Archana; Zaheera
- Music by: Salil Chowdhury
- Release date: 22 December 1972
- Country: India
- Language: Hindi

Anokha Daan is a 1972 Hindi film directed by Asit Sen. The film starred Anil Dhawan, Rakesh Pandey, Kabir Bedi and Zaheera in lead roles.

== Cast ==
- Kabir Bedi
- Tarun Bose
- Anil Dhawan
- Mukri
- Nadira
- Rakesh Pandey
- Zaheera
- Archana

== Music ==
The music of the film was composed by Salil Chowdhury, while lyrics were penned by Yogesh, except for the song " Madhbhari Yeh Hawaein" which was written by Gulzar, and contains songs such as:

- "Hame Yaad Kahin You Kar Leta" (Lata Mangeshkar)
- "Madhbhari Yeh Hawaein" (Lata Mangeshkar)
- "Hamrahi Manzil Ke" (Kishore Kumar)
- "Mana Ki Hai Zindagi" (Manna Dey)
- "Aayen Ghir Ghir Saavan Ki Kali Kali Ghatayen" (Kishore Kumar)
