= Jyot Jale =

- Directed by: Satyen Bose
- Written by: Nabendu Ghosh
- Produced by: K. H. Bhuva; VasantKumar Goni
- Starring: Nirupa Roy; Tarun Bose; Abhi Bhattacharya
- Release date: 1973
- Country: India
- Language: Hindi

Jyot Jale (Burning Flame) is a 1973 Bollywood drama film directed by Satyen Bose. The film based on the story of Bengali author Nabendu Ghosh.

== Cast ==
- Abhi Bhattacharya
- Mumtaz
- Asit Sen
- Nirupa Roy
- Dara Singh
- Tarun Bose
- Shahu Modak
