= Ashutosh Mukhopadhyay =

Indian writer (1920–1989)

- Ashutosh Mukhopadhyay
- Born: 7 September 1920; Bajrajogini, Bikrampur, Dhaka, Bengal, British India
- Died: 4 May 1989 (aged 68); Calcutta, West Bengal, India
- Occupations: Novelist; Author

Ashutosh Mukhopadhyay (anglicised spelling of surname: Mukherjee) (7 September 1920 – 4 May 1989) was a prominent Indian writer of modern Bengali literature.

== Life and works ==
Mukhopadhyay was born in 1920, in Bajrajogini, Bikrampur, Dacca (now Dhaka) as the fifth of ten children of a Bengali Kulin Brahmin couple, Paresh Chandra Mukhopadhyay and Tarubala Devi. Mukhopadyay graduated in commerce from Hooghly Mohsin College, then affiliated to the University of Calcutta. His first story was Nurse Mitra, published in the newspaper Basumati, which was later made into major movies (Deep Jwele Jai in Bengali and Khamoshi in Hindi). Bollywood films like Safar (1970) and Bemisal were also made from his novels.

His first novel was Swaha, also published in Basumati and later renamed as Ruper Hate Bikikini. His first published novel was Kaalchakra, but he made his mark as novelist with his fourth published novel, Chalachal, especially from its successful cinematisation by Asit Sen in 1956. The cinematisation of Panchatapa in 1957 by the same director, further enhanced the writer's reputation.

He joined the newspaper Jugantar in 1955 after joining and leaving nine jobs and subsequently became the head of the Sunday special of the newspaper. He died on 4 May 1989.

Ashutosh Mukhopadhyay was one of the most cinematised authors of Bengali literature. Some of the movies made from his stories and novels are listed below. Many of his novels have been translated in other Indian languages. Love and romance and the human relationship are recurring themes of his novels.

== Books ==
1. Panchatapa
2. Chalachal
3. Nagar Darpane
4. Tin Purush
5. Sonar Harin Nei
6. Kaal Tumi Aleya
7. Shilapate Likha
8. Saat Paake Bandha
9. Anandaroop
10. Aami Se O Sakha
11. Sabuj Toran Chhariye
12. Ashutosh Mukhopadhyay Rachanabali
13. Ashutosh Mukhopadhyay Rachanabali
14. Aashray
15. Aaro Ek Jan
16. Aalor Thikana
17. Aabaar Aami Aasbo
18. Jar Jetha Ghar
19. Balakar Man
20. Parkpale Raja Rani
21. Jakhan manush holam
22. Hridayer Pathe Khunjo
23. Kichhu Katha Chhilo
24. Dui Nayika
25. Sei Ajanar Khonje
26. Pranay Adim
27. Tin Bhag Jal

== Adaptations of works ==
- Talaash, 1992 Indian drama series which aired on DD National, based Sonar Kathi Rupor Kathi
- Chalachal
- Safar
- Deep Jwele Jai
- Khamoshi
- Kaal Tumi Aleya
- Ami, Shey O Shakha (1975)
- Bemisal
- Amar Kantak
- Saat Pake Bandha
- Kora Kagaz
- Aalor Thikana
- Aro Ekjan (1980)
- Nabaraag (1971), based on Natun tulir taan
- Sankhabela (1966) from the story 'Sandesh'
- Sabarmati (1969)
- Panchatapa (1957)
