= Talaash (Indian TV series) =

- Created by: Geetanjali Minidub
- Based on: Sonar Kathi Rupor Kathi by Ashutosh Mukherjee
- Directed by: Hrishikesh Mukherjee
- Starring: see below
- Music by: Hemant Kumar Mukherjee
- Opening theme: "Jeevan Ek Pyaas Hain"
- Country of origin: India
- Original language: Hindi
- No. of seasons: 1
- No. of episodes: 26

Production
- Producer: Jayanta Mukherjee
- Editor: Deepak Kapoor
- Running time: approximately 23 minutes

Original release
- Network: DD National
- Release: 1992

Talaash (English: "The Search") is an Indian drama series that aired in 1992 on Doordarshan. Directed by Hrishikesh Mukherjee, the film is based on the novel Sonar Kathi Rupor Kathi by Ashutosh Mukherjee. The title song sung by Suresh Wadekar and lyrics by Yogesh was a cover of the song "Tum Pukar Lo". Episode 9 has a song sung by Sonu Nigam with music by Usha Khanna.

The cast of the series includes Moushumi Chatterjee.

== Plot ==
As the name suggests this is a story of search of old lost family friend of the lead character. Shankarlal Shrivastava Alok Nath is an author who is returning from a function by train. On the way back he is passing from a village "Sarsavan", the name of which strikes him prominently but he cannot remember the relation. Once he gets down the train and goes in that village he realizes the link. The last letter from Sudhir (Vijayendra Ghatge), Shankarlal's close family friend was sent from this village. Sudhir is the son of Shankarlal's mother's closest friend who consider themselves as sisters. The two families are very close to each other. On insistence of his mother Sudhir takes a job and leaves the family. Shankarlal takes care of Sudhir's mother in her last days. However, after some days there is no contact from Sudhir and all ties are lost. The last and very faint tie is the place from where Sudhir had sent his last letter which is from village 'Sarsavan'. It is then the story of Shankarlal's quest to find his long lost friend and to know the reason and consequences why he disappeared.

== Cast ==
- Alok Nath as Shankarlal Shrivastava the author and lead character.
- Beena as Shankarlal's wife.
- Vijayendra Ghatge as Sudhir the long lost friend of Shankarlal.
- Moushumi Chatterjee as Urmila/Behenaji.
- Dina Pathak as Sudhir's mother.
- Avtar Gill as Mukhiya Veeru
- Pallavi Joshi as Junglee, Mukhiya's daughter
- Rajendra Gupta as Fardu
- Sushmita Mukherjee as Janaki
- Asha Sharma as Rani Ma/Ahilya
- Goga Kapoor as Raja
- Neelima Azeem as Pramila
- Manoj Verma as Kanhaiya
- Chandrakant Gokhale as Mishra ji
