= Annadata (1972 film) =

- Poster
- Directed by: Asit Sen
- Starring: Jaya Bhaduri; Anil Dhawan
- Cinematography: Kamal Bose
- Music by: Salil Chowdhury
- Production company: L. B. Films
- Release date: 21 April 1972
- Country: India
- Language: Hindi

Annadata (transl. The food provider) is a 1972 Indian Hindi-language drama film directed by Asit Sen. The film stars Jaya Bhaduri and Anil Dhawan and Om Prakash in pivotal role.

== Plot ==
Amba Prasad, a rich benevolent man, people refer to him as 'anndata' (the food provider). He is supposed to have died in an Air crash and all his "relatives" gather to find out how much they can inherit. A poor girl he literally brought up like his daughter claims to be carrying his baby, under pressure from her greedy parents. However, it turns out that Amba Prasad is alive as he had missed the flight. His lawyer makes him see the harsh reality that none of his so-called relatives were there to pay respect to him, but to get his money. Disheartened, he leaves his house with his faithful dog.

He ends up in a little village and meets Arun, an artist (Anil Dhawan), who paints a portrait of Amba Prasad sleeping under a tree guarded by his dog. He assumes that Amba Prasad is a poor man and pays him. Later, Amba Prasad faints as he is exhausted. The dog brings Aarti to help his master. Soon Amba Prasad becomes a part of Aarti's family, the only other member of it being Aarti's little brother, who is disabled. Aarti makes medicines and gives it to the villagers and refuses to take money for her services. Her only income is from typing and stitching clothes for people. Arun and Aarti love each other. However, Arun realizes that he is just a poor artist and cannot afford to support Aarti, her brother and pay her debts, when he can barely manage to look after himself and his mother. Hence, he tries to find a rich husband for Aarti. Aarti refuses to even consider this.

Amba Prasad is impressed by their honesty and steadfastness in adversity. He goes back to his home and tells his lawyer friend that loving people who love others still exists. The lawyer does not believe him and to test them sends a letter with false news of Amba Prasad's illness and asks them to come there. When Aarti and Arun reach there he tells them that Amba Prasad has died. As he was in fact a rich man he has bequeathed them his cash and property. However both Aarti and Arun refuse to take the wealth. They ask him to donate it to needy in memory of 'anndata'. Amba Prasad appears and tells them as they know how to put his money to good use he will stay with them, till the end of his life.

== Cast ==
- Jaya Bhaduri as Aarti
- Anil Dhawan as Arun
- Om Prakash as Amba Prasad 'Annadata'
- Krishnakant as Pestonji Vasiyatwala
- Dulari as Arun's Mother
- Shamim as Ratna
- Asit Sen as Motu Bhandari
- Brahm Bhardwaj as Man who bought Arun's painting
- Bobby as Kundan
- Gopi Krishna as Dancer "O Meri Pran Sajni" (as Gopi Kishen)
- Madhumati as Champavati
- Tarun Bose as Ratna's Father
- Praveen Paul as Ratna's Mother (as Praveen Pal)
- Kanhaiyalal as Landlord (as Kanahiyalal)
- Leela Mishra as Chachi (as Leela Misra)
- Baby Guddi as Young Ratna

== Soundtrack ==
Song title	Singer	Lyricist	Actors
"Guzar Jaaye Din Din Din"	Kishore Kumar	Salil Chowdhury, Yogesh	Jaya Bhaduri, Anil Dhawan
"O Meri Pran Sajni Champavati Aaja"	Kishore Kumar, Sabita Chowdhury	Salil Chowdhury, Yogesh	Gopi Kishan, Madhumati
"Nain Hamaare Saanjh Sakaare, Dekhane Laakhon Sapane"	Mukesh	Salil Chowdhury, Yogesh	Anil Dhawan, Jaya Bhaduri, Om Prakash
"Raaton Ke Saaye Ghane Jab Bojh Dil Par Bane"	Lata Mangeshkar	Salil Chowdhury, Yogesh	Anil Dhawan, Jaya Bhaduri, Om Prakash
"Nis Din Nis Din Mera Julmi Sajan Aisi Batiya Banye Na"	Lata Mangeshkar	Salil Chowdhury, Yogesh	
"Yaha Ab Kya Rehna, Kisi Se Kya Kehna"	Manna Dey, Sabita Chowdhury	Salil Chowdhury, Yogesh	
