= Amjad Hossain (lawyer) =

Bangladeshi lawyer and politician

Member of Parliament for Pabna-12
- In office 1973–1975
- Preceded by: Constituency Established
- Succeeded by: Mirza Abdul Halim

Personal details
- Born: January 1, 1934
- Died: March 22, 2015 (aged 81)
- Party: Bangladesh Awami League
- Spouse: Jannatul Ferdous

Amjad Hossain (1 January 1934 – 22 March 2015) was a Bangladeshi lawyer and politician, and former member of parliament from Pabna belonging to Bangladesh Awami League. He was one of the senior advocates of the Pabna Bar and played an active role in political movements in East Pakistan and Bangladesh, including the Bangladesh Liberation War.

== Biography ==
Amjad Hossain was an organizer of the Liberation War of Bangladesh. After liberation he was elected as a member of the Jatiya Sangsad from Pabna-12 in 1973. He died on 22 March 2015 at the age of 80.

== Early life and education ==
Muhammad Amjad Hossain was born on 1 January 1934 in Bhopara village of Atrai Upazila in Naogaon District, then part of British India. His permanent residence was at Nirjhar Bhaban in Gopalpur, Pabna. His father was S. M. Hefaz Uddin and his mother was Aziza Khatun.

He began his primary education at Bhopara Free Primary School and passed the matriculation examination in the first division from Naogaon High Madrasa in 1949. He completed his Intermediate of Arts (IA) from Edward College in 1952 and earned his bachelor’s degree in 1954, securing 9th position in the merit list. Notably, he sat for his BA examination while imprisoned. In 1956, he obtained an LL.B. degree from the University of Rajshahi.

== Legal Career ==
Amjad Hossain began his legal career in 1958 by joining the Pabna Judge Court as an advocate. He later became one of the most senior lawyers of the Pabna Bar.

He served as government pleader (GP) from 1972 to 1974 and was elected twice as a member of the Bangladesh Bar Council during the 1992–1998 period. He gained recognition as a respected legal professional and dedicated political figure in his community.

== Political Activities ==
During his student life at Edward College, Hossain became involved in student politics through the Awami League’s student organization. He actively participated in several major political movements, including the boycott movement against the Muslim League conference in Pabna, the United Front election movement of 1954, the Education Movement of 1962, the Six-Point Movement of 1966, the Mass Uprising of 1969, and the Bangladesh Liberation War in 1971.

During the Liberation War, he served as assistant director of a freedom fighter supply camp in the eastern sector of Pabna District. On 2 April 1971, he traveled to Kolkata along with Advocate Rafique Miah and Ali Ahmad (Kushtia) to coordinate with the government of West Bengal. During this time, he met communist leader Ila Mitra and others.

He was imprisoned multiple times for political reasons: twice in 1974, once in 1975, during the Moshtaque administration in 1976, and again during the Ershad regime in 1987.

In 1973, he was elected as a member of parliament from the Pabna-5 constituency (formerly constituency no. 2).

== Organizational roles ==
Amjad Hossain held several organizational and political positions:

- General Secretary, Pabna Motor Workers’ Association (1958–1969)
- President, Pabna Ad hoc Workers’ Association (until 1971)
- Labour and Social Welfare Secretary, Pabna District Awami League (1969–1972)

He also served as President of Jannatul Maowa Jame Mosque in Gopalpur and was one of the founders of Pabna Women’s College.

== Publications ==
His autobiographical work titled Bismritopray (“Almost Forgotten”) has been published.

== Family ==
Amjad Hossain was married to Professor Jannatul Ferdous. She was a member of the Jatiya Sangsad too and served as a Member of Parliament in a reserved women’s seat from 1996 to 2001. They had one son and two daughters.
