= Kumud Tripathi =

Kumud Tripathi was a character actor in Bollywood films. He has appeared in 73 films during his career. He has appeared in evergreen films like Dilli Ka Thug (1958), Oonche Log (1965), Maha Sati Savitri (1973), Dhoop Chhaon (1977), and Sadak (1991).

== Filmography ==
- Humse Badhkar Kaun: The Entertainer (1998)
- Sadak (1991)
- Jurm (1990)
- Joshilaay (1989)
- Nukkad (TV series) (1986-1987)
- Teerthyatra (1987)
- Shravan Kumar
- Paan Khaye Saiyan Hamaar (1984)
- Devi Ma Maya (1984)
- Pasand Apni Apni (1983)
- Jawalaa Dahej Ki (1982)
- Sanam Teri Kasam (1982)
- Chunaoti (1980)
- Jaagal Bhag Hamaar (1980)
- Darwaza (1978)
- Jagal Bhaag Hamar (1978)
- Agar... If (1977)
- Angaare (1977)
- Immaan Dharam (1977)
- Dhoop Chhaon (1977)
- Raakhi Aur Rifle (1976)
- Dus Numbri (1976)
- Angaarey (1975)
- Himalay Se Ooncha (1975)
- Andhera (1975)
- Insaaniyat (1974)
- Mahasati Savitri (1973)
- Ek Hasina Do Diwane (1972)
- Jawan Muhabat (1971)
- Kathputli (1971)
- Jwala (1971)
- Hungama (1971)
- Adhikar (1971)
- Pagla Kahin Ka (1970)
- Nateeja (1969)
- Aansoo Ban Gaye Phool (1969)
- Tatar Ki Hasina (1968)
- Kazaki (1966)
- Mohabbat Isko Kahete Hain (1965)
- Oonche Log (1965)
- Ek Din Ka Badshah (1964)
- Dulha Dulhan (1964)
- Been Ka Jadoo (1963)
- Kan Kan Men Bhagwan (1963)
- Kala Ghoda (1963)
- Pick Pocket (1962)
- Shama (1961)
- Passport (1961)
- Shan-E-Hind (1960)
- Do Aadmi (1960)
- Shriman Satyawadi (1960)
- College Girl (1960)
- C.I.D. Girl (1959)
- Dilli Ka Thug (1958)
- Baarish (1957)
- Apradhi Kaun? (1957)
- Pocket Maar (1956)
- Some Where in Delhi (1956)
- Duniya Gol Hai (1955)
- Sangram (1955)
