= Pabna Government Girls' High School =

Location
- Dilalpur, Pabna Boro BazarPabna; Bangladesh; 24°01′08″N 89°25′0″E

Information
- Type: Public
- Established: 1883
- School district: Pabna
- Principal: Abdul Jabbar
- Grades: 3 (3rd Grade) to 10 (10th grade) (PSC, JSC, SSC)
- Enrollment: 240
- Nickname: PGGHS

Pabna Government Girls High School (Bengali: পাবনা সরকারী উচ্চ বালিকা বিদ্যালয়) is one of the oldest secondary schools in Pabna District, Bangladesh. The school provides education from class Three to class Ten (SSC). It has two shifts - morning and day. The morning shift starts from 7.30 am and day shift from 12.30 pm. It is a girls school but has both male and female teachers. The school has one head master and two separate group of teachers for morning and day shift. It has a playground, three buildings and a mosque. There are individual laboratories for physics, chemistry, biology, and computer.

== History ==
Pabna Government Girls' High School was established in 1883. It became a High School in 1925 located in a two storied building in downtown Pabna.

Pabna Government Girls' High School did not have a headmaster in 2010, one of 30 schools without a headmaster in Rajshahi Division.

In 2011, Pabna Government Girls' High School was one of 20 best scoring schools in JSC examinations under Rajshahi Education Board. It was one of five schools in Pabna District to have a 100 percent pass rate on the SSC examination in 2012.

== Location ==
The school is located in the center of Pabna town at Dilalpur at 24°01′08″N 89°25′0″E.

== Notable alumni and faculty ==
- Suchitra Sen
- Jannatul Ferdous
- Rawshan Ara
