= Suchitra Sen =

Indian actress (1931–2014)

Mahanayika Suchitra Sen
- Pronunciation: [ˈʃut͡ʃit̪ɾa ˈʃen]
- Born: Roma Dasgupta; 6 April 1931; Belkuchi, Pabna, Bengal Presidency, British Raj (now Sirajganj, Bangladesh)
- Died: 17 January 2014 (aged 82); Kolkata, West Bengal, India
- Occupation: Actress
- Years active: 1952–1978
- Works: Filmography
- Spouse: Dibanath Sen (m. 1947; died 1970)
- Children: Moon Moon Sen
- Relatives: Raima Sen (granddaughter); Riya Sen (granddaughter)
- Awards: Padma Shri (1972); Banga Bibhushan (2012)

Suchitra Sen (Note: pronounced [ˈʃut͡ʃit̪ɾa ˈʃen].) (Bengali: [ˈʃut͡ʃit̪ɾa ˈʃen]; born Roma Dasgupta; (Note: pronounced [ˈrɔma ˈd̪aʃɡupt̪oˑ]; also known as Krishna.) April 6, 1931 – January 17, 2014), widely known as the Mahanayika, (Note: Bengali pronunciation: [ˈmɔɦanai̯ka], lit. 'Great actress'.) was worked in Bengali and Hindi cinema. The movies in which she was paired opposite actor Uttam Kumar became classics in the history of Bengali cinema. Sen won the Silver Prize for Best Actress for Saat Pake Bandha at the 3rd Moscow International Film Festival in 1963, thus became the first Indian actress to receive an award at an international film festival.

In 1972, she was awarded the Padma Shri, the fourth highest civilian award in India. From 1979 on, she retreated from public life and shunned all forms of public contact; for this she is often compared to Greta Garbo. In 2005, she refused the Dadasaheb Phalke Award, the highest cinematic award in India, to stay out of the public eye. In 2012, she was conferred the West Bengal Government's highest honour: Banga Bibhushan.

== Personal life and education ==
Suchitra Sen was born on 6 April 1931, in a Bengali family in Bhanga Bari, Belkuchi Upazila, located in the Bengal Province, British India—now in Sirajganj, Bangladesh. Her ancestral home was in Jashore. Her father, Korunamoy Dasgupta, was a Sanitary Inspector of Pabna Municipality and her mother, Indira Devi, was a homemaker. Sen was their fifth child and second daughter. She was a granddaughter of the poet Rajanikanta Sen. She received her formal education in Pabna Government Girls High School. The violence of Partition in 1947 brought her family to West Bengal. Here she married Dibanath Sen, son of wealthy industrialist Adinath Sen, in 1947, at the age of 16 years. She had one daughter, Moon Moon Sen, who is a former actress. Suchitra's father-in-law, Adinath Sen, was supportive of her acting career in films after her marriage. Her industrialist husband invested greatly in her career and supported her. He died in 1970.

Sen had made a successful entry into Bengali films in 1952, and then a less successful transition into the Hindi movie industry. According to persistent but unconfirmed reports in the Bengali press, her marriage was strained by her success in the film industry.

== Career ==
Suchitra Sen made her debut in the film Shesh Kothaay in 1952, though it was never released. Her first official release was Sukumar Dasgupta's Saat Number Kayedi (1953). She was catapulted to stardom after she was cast as Vishnupriya by Devaki Kumar Bose in his Bhagaban Shree Krishna Chaitanya (1953). In 1953, she acted opposite Uttam Kumar in Sharey Chuattor, a film by Nirmal Dey. It was a box-office hit and is remembered for launching Uttam-Suchitra as a leading pair. They went on to become the icons for Bengali dramas for more than 20 years, becoming almost a genre unto themselves. She has acted in 30 of her 60 films with Uttam Kumar. Her first Hindi movie was Devdas (1955). Dilip Kumar won the Filmfare Award for Best Actor and Vyjayantimala won for Best Supporting Actress, but Sen was not nominated for the Best Actress award due to political reasons; she was later nominated for a Filmfare Award only for Mamta (1966) and Aandhi (1974). Her Bengali melodramas and romances, especially with Uttam Kumar, made her the most famous Bengali actress ever.

Her films ran through the 1960s and '70s. Suchitra went on to act in films such as in the Hindi film Aandhi (1974). Aandhi was inspired by India's Prime Minister Indira Gandhi. Due to politics in the film industry, even though she had a more powerful role than Sanjeev Kumar and her acting was highly praised, Sen only received a Filmfare Award nomination for Best Actress, while Sanjeev Kumar, who played the role of her husband, won the Filmfare for Best Actor. Rishi Kapoor once stated in an interview that his Filmfare award for the film Bobby had been bought for ₹30,000, and that if the award had not been bought, it would have been won by Amitabh Bachchan for the film Zanjeer (1973).

One of her best known performances was in Deep Jwele Jaai (1959). She portrayed a character named Radha Mitra, a hospital nurse employed by a progressive psychiatrist, Pahadi Sanyal, who is expected to develop a personal relationship with male patients as part of their therapy. Sanyal diagnoses the hero, Basanta Choudhury, as having an unresolved Oedipal dilemma. He orders Radha to play the role though she is hesitant as in a similar case she had fallen in love with the patient. She finally agrees and bears up to Choudhury's violence, impersonates his mother, sings his poetic compositions and in the process falls in love again. In the end, even as she brings about his cure, she suffers a nervous breakdown. The film is noted for its partly lit close-ups of Sen, which set the tone of the film. Asit Sen remade the film in Hindi as Khamoshi (1969), with Waheeda Rehman in the Suchitra Sen role.

Suchitra Sen's other landmark film with Asit Sen was Uttar Falguni (1963). She plays the dual role of a courtesan, Pannabai, and her daughter Suparna, a lawyer. Critics note that she brought a great deal of poise, grace and dignity to the role of a fallen woman determined to see her daughter grow up in a good, clean environment.

Suchitra Sen's international success came in 1963, when she won the best actress award at the Moscow International Film Festival for the movie Saat Paake Bandha, becoming the first Indian actress to receive an international film award.

== In retirement ==
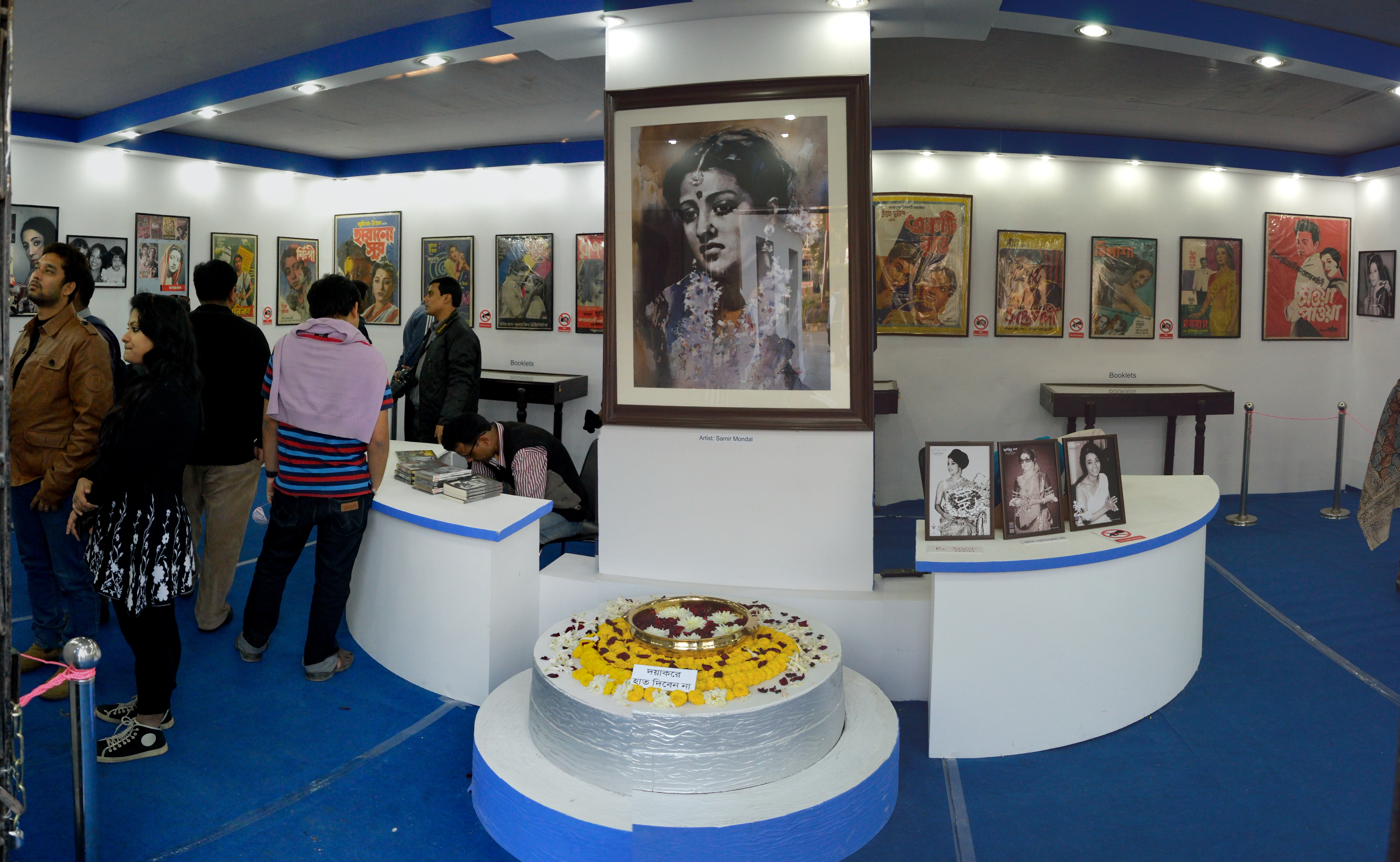
Smritituku Thak a tribute to Sen at the Kolkata Book Fair in 2014. 29 Jan 2014.

Suchitra Sen refused Satyajit Ray's offer due to a scheduling problem. As a result, Ray never made the film Debi Chowdhurani, based on the novel written by Rishi Bankim Chandra Chattopadhyay. She also refused Raj Kapoor's offer for a film under the RK banner.

Sen continued to act after her husband's death in 1970, but called it a day when Pronoy Pasha flopped, and retired from the screen in 1978 after a career of over 25 years to a life of quiet seclusion. She was to do a film project; Nati Binodini, also starring Rajesh Khanna, but the film was shelved mid-way after shooting when she decided to quit acting.

She assiduously avoided the public gaze after her retirement and devoted her time to the Ramakrishna Mission.

== Death ==
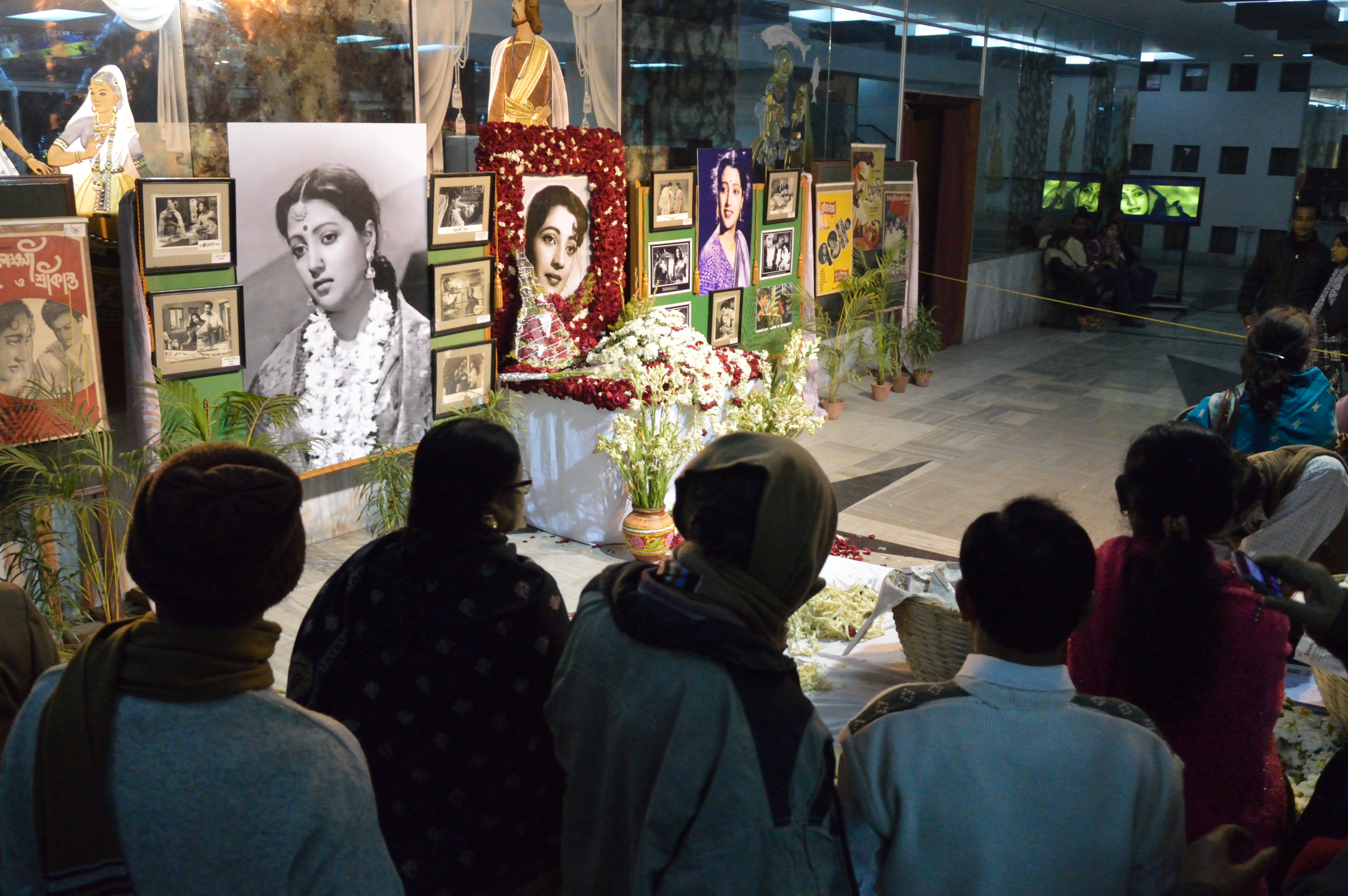
Suchitra Sen remembrance at Rabindra Sadan, Kolkata, on 19 January 2014.

Sen was admitted to the hospital on 24 December 2013 and was diagnosed with a lung infection. She was reported to have been recovering well in the first week of January. Her condition later worsened and she died at 8:25 am on 17 January 2014 due to a heart attack. She was 82 years old.

Sen's death was condoled by many leaders, including the president of India Pranab Mukherjee, the Prime Minister Dr. Manmohan Singh, the Prime Minister of Bangladesh, Sheikh Hasina, and BJP's Prime Ministerial candidate Narendra Modi. A gun salute was given before her cremation, upon the orders of Mamata Banerjee, the Chief Minister of West Bengal.

Respecting her desire for complete privacy, her last rites were performed at Kolkata's Kaioratola crematorium, barely five and half hours after she died; her coffin reached the crematorium in a flower-decked hearse with dark-tinted windows. Despite being one of Bengal's stars, referred to as "Mahanayika", she had chosen to step into oblivion and remained an enigma till her last, although thousands of fans had converged at the crematorium to catch one last glimpse of their idol. Her entire medical treatment had also been done in seclusion and secrecy.

== Legacy ==
Sen is best known for her acting, beauty and grace. She was noted for her unique ability to convincingly portray both an Indian girl as well as the anglicised city sophisticate. Rediff wrote about Sen, "Suchitra Sen is not just a yesteryear heroine, who produced numerous box office hits. She is a cult figure, an integral part of Bengali fantasy. Her affair with Hindi films was a short one. But whatever the role, she performed it with an intensity that kept audiences glued to their seats. It is this magnetism that has made her a legend. Together with Uttam Kumar, she gave us Bengali movies that speak to our hearts even today." Film critic Saibal Chatterjee summed up Sen's career saying "one half of one of Indian cinema's most popular and abiding screen pairs, Suchitra Sen redefined stardom in a way that few actors have done, combining understated sensuality, feminine charm and emotive force and a no-nonsense gravitas to carve out a persona that has never been matched, let alone surpassed in Indian cinema".

== Filmography ==
From 1953 to 1978, both in Bengali and Hindi, Suchitra Sen acted in 61 films.

No	Year	Movie	Release date	Role	Director	Hero	Notes
1	1952	Shesh Kothaay	NA	NA	Bireswar Basu (??)	NA	Never released. However, after 22 years in January 1974 this movie was finally released in different name as " Shrabana Shandhya ", directed by may be Bireswar Basu (??).
2	1953	Saat Number Kayedi	7 Feb 1953	Aruna	Sukumar Dasgupta	Samar Roy	This was her first officially released film.
3	1953	Sharey Chuattor	20 Feb 1953	Romola	Nirmal Dey	Uttam Kumar	First hit of "Uttam-Suchitra's".
4	1953	Bhagaban Srikrishna Chaitanya	11 Dec 1953	Bishnupriya	Debaki Bose	Basanta Chaudhury	First hit of legendary "Basanta-Suchitra" pair. And it was one of the first Suchitra Sen's Hindu Vaishnab Philosophy based movies. She acted the role of "Vishnu Priya', the wife of Sri Cahaitanya Mahaprobhu
5	1953	Kajori	10 April 1953		Niren Lahiri	No major hero	
6	1954	Atom Bomb	1 Jan 1954		Taru Mukherjee	Robin Majumdar	She appeared as an extra in this film. It was shot in 1951 but released in 1954. Sabitri Chatterjee was the actual heroine of this small film
7	1954	Ora Thake Odhare	5 Feb 1954	Nilu	Sukumar Dasgupta	Uttam Kumar	
8	1954	Dhuli	3 Jun 1954	Minati	Pinaki Mukherjee	Prasanta Kumar	
9	1954	Maraner Parey	25 Jun 1954	Tanima	Satish Dasgupta	Uttam Kumar	
10	1954	Sadanander Mela	16 Jul 1954	Sheela	Sukumar Dasgupta	Uttam Kumar	
11	1954	Annapurnar Mandir	6 Aug 1954	Sati	Naresh Mitra	Uttam Kumar	Music Director's name is unavailable and unfortunately was NOT even mentioned on the Title-Card of this movie
12	1954	Agnipariksha	3 Sep 1954	Taposhi	Agradoot	Uttam Kumar	Suchitra-Uttam starring first Box Office Superhit Movie. That was the beginning of their Bengali film iconic image of "Sonar-Juti"
13	1954	Grihaprabesh	12 Nov 1954		Ajoy Kar	Uttam Kumar	
14	1954	Balaygras	17 Dec 1954	Manimala			
15	1955	Sanjher Pradip	28 Jan 1955	Raju	Sudhanshu Mukherjee	Uttam Kumar	
16	1955	Devdas	1 Jan 1955	Parvati (Paro)	Bimal Roy	Dilip Kumar	Her First Hindi language film Based on Sarat Chandra Chattopadhyay's novel "Devdas"
17	1955	Snaajhghar	11 Mar 1955				
18	1955	Shapmochan	27 May 1955	Madhuri	Shudhir Mukherjee	Uttam Kumar	Suchitra-Uttam starring Second Box Office Superhit Movie based on Phalguni Mukhopadhyay's novel " Sandhya Raag".
19	1955	Mejo Bou	30 Sep 1955				
20	1955	Bhalobasa	6 Oct 1955			Basanta Chaudhury	
21	1955	Sabar Uparey	1 Dec 1955	Rita	Agradoot	Uttam Kumar	Based on Scottish Writer A. J. Cronin's novel, "Beyond This Place". From this novel Bengali Movie "Sabar Uparey" was made in 1955. Then in 1958 Dev Anand made the same story in Hindi name "Kala Pani" directed by Raj Khoshla. However, the English film with the same title of the book was released in 1959 directed by Jack Cardiff
22	1956	Sagarika	1 Feb 1956	Sagarika	Agradoot	Uttam Kumar	
23	1956	Subharaatri	30 Mar 1956	Shanti/Sudha	Sushil Majumdar	Basanta Chaudhury	
24	1956	Ekti Raat	11 May 1956	Santana	Chitta Bose	Uttam Kumar	
25	1956	Trijama	28 June 1956	Swarupa	Agradoot	Uttam Kumar	
26	1956	Shilpi	30 Nov 1956	Anjana	Agragami	Uttam Kumar	
27	1956	Amar Bou	14 Dec 1956			Bikash Roy	
28	1957	Harano Sur	6 Sep 1957	Dr. Roma Banerjee	Ajoy Kar	Uttam Kumar	Based on James Hilton's immortal Novel "Random Harvest" a 1942 Hollywood hit movie starring Ronald Colman and Greer Garson
29	1957	Chandranath	15 Nov 1957	Saraju	Kartik Chattopadhyay	Uttam Kumar	Based on Sarat Chandra Chattopadhyay's novel "Chandranath". It is also the first Bengali movie ever released in Calcutta Metro Cinema.
30	1957	Pathe Holo Deri	5 Dec 1957	Mallika Banerjee	Agradoot	Uttam Kumar	A novel by then novelist Ms. Prativa Basu.
31	1957	Jeeban Trishna	25 Dec 1957	Shakuntala	Ashit Sen	Uttam Kumar	
32	1957	Musafir	26 April 1957	Shakuntala Verma	Hrishikesh Mukherjee	Shekhar Kumar	Hindi language
33	1957	Champakali	31 Dec 1957	Rajo	Nandlal Jaswantlal	Bharat Bhushan	Hindi language
34	1958	Rajlakshmi O Srikanta	28 Feb 1958	Rajlakshmi	Haridas Bhattacharya	Uttam Kumar	Based on Sarat Chandra Chattopadhyay's novel "Srikanta"
35	1958	Suryatoran	21 Nov 1958	Anita Chatterjee	Agradoot	Uttam Kumar	Based on the 1949 Warner Brothers film "The Fountain Head" written by then Russian-American writer Ayn Rand. Starring Garry Cooper, Patricia Neal, Raymond Messy, Kent Smith, the film was directed by Mr. King Vidor. In the Bengali film "Suryatoran", Suchitra Sen did the role of "Dominique" the main female character which was portrayed by Ms. Patricia Neal in "The Fountainhead".
36	1958	Indrani	10 Oct 1958	Indrani	Niren Lahiri	Uttam Kumar	
37	1959	Deep Jwele Jaai	1 May 1959	Radha Mitra	Ashit Sen	Basanta Chaudhury	Block-buster movie.
38	1959	Chaowa Paowa	27 Feb 1959	Manju	Yatrik	Uttam Kumar	The story was adapted from Samuel Hopkins Adams's short story "Night Bus", published in 1933. Director Frank Capra later adapted it into the 1934 Oscar-winning blockbuster Hollywood film It Happened One Night, starring Clark Gable and Claudette Colbert.
39	1960	Hospital	16 Sep 1960	Dr. Sarbari Roy	Shushil Majumdar	Ashok Kumar	
40	1960	Smriti Tuku Thak	23 Sep 1960	Shobha/Utpala	Yatrik	Ashit Baran / Bikash Roy	This was the first time she played a double role in her career.
41	1960	Bombai Ka Baboo	2 Dec 1960	Maya	Raj Khosla	Dev Anand	Hindi language
42	1960	Sarhad	9 Sep 1960	Mala	Shankar Mukherjee	Dev Anand	Hindi language
43	1961	Saptapadi	20 Oct 1961	Rina Brown	Ajoy Kar	Uttam Kumar	
44	1962	Bipasha	26 Jan 1962	Bipasha	Agradoot	Uttam Kumar	This was the first film for which Suchitra Sen charged ₹1 lakh, making her the first Bengali actor to receive that amount for a film role.
45	1963	Saat Pake Bandha	22 Mar 1963	Archana	Ajay Kar	Soumitra Chatterjee	Won Best Actress award at 3rd Moscow International Film Festival, thus became the first Indian actress to win an international film festival award.
46	1963	Uttar Falguni	11 Oct 1963	Debjani / Pannabai / Suparna	Ashit Sen	Dilip Mukherjee, Bikash Roy	Based on the novel Uttar Falguni by the well-known Bengali writer Dr. Nihar Ranjan Gupta.
47	1964	Sandhya Deeper Sikha	2 Oct 1964	Jayanti Bannerjee	Haridas Bhattacharya	Dilip Mukherjee, Bikash Roy	It was based on Bengali novelist Tarun K. Bhaduri's book Sandhya Deeper Shikha. The movie was also produced by Dilip Mukherjee.
48	1966	Mamta	27 Feb 1966	Devyani / Pannabai / Suparna	Asit Sen	Dharmendra, Ashok Kumar	Hindi version of Bengali film "Uttar Phalguni"
49	1967	Grihadaha	5 May 1967	Achala	Subodh Mitra	Uttam Kumar	Based on Sarat Chandra Chattopadhyay's novel "Grihadaha"
50	1969	Kamallata	2 Oct 1969	Kamallata	Haridas Bhattacharya	Uttam Kumar	Based on Sarat Chandra Chattopadhyay's novel "Kamallata"
51	1970	Megh Kalo	4 Sep 1970	Dr. Nirmalya Roy	Shushil Mukherjee	Basanta Chaudhury	
52	1971	Nabaraag	4 Feb 1971		Bijoy Bose	Uttam Kumar	
53	1971	Fariyad	5 Nov 1971	Chapa/Ratanmala	Bijoy Basu	Utpal Dutta	
54	1972	Alo Amaar Alo	17 Mar 1972	Atashi		Uttam Kumar	
55	1972	Har Mana Har	19 Dec 1972	Neera		Uttam Kumar	
56	1974	Devi Chowdhurani	6 Sep 1974	Prafullamukhi / Devi Chowdhurani	Dinen Gupta	Ranjit Mallick	
57	1974	Srabana Sandhya	25 Jan 1974		Bireswar Basu (??)		However,"Shrabana Shandhya's" original name was "Shesy Kothaay" it was half done in 1952 and was never released at that time, after 22 years later it came out and released in Jan 1974, may be it was directed by Bireswar Basu, who was the original Director of "Shesy Kothaay" film in 1952 .
58	1975	Priyo Bandhabi	3 Oct 1975			Uttam Kumar	
59	1975	Aandhi	13 Feb 1975	Aarti Devi	Gulzar	Sanjeev Kumar	Hindi language
60	1976	Datta	30 Jul 1976	Datta	Ajoy Kar	Soumitra Chatterjee	Based on Sarat Chandra Chattopadhyay's novel Datta
61	1978	Pranay Pasha	9 June 1978	Taposhi	Mangal Chakraborty	Soumitra Chatterjee	This was her last movie released

== Honours ==
Suchitra Sen received 10 awards during her lifetime. In 1963, she became the first Indian actress to receive an international award.

- 1962 – Won BFJA Award for Best Actress for Saptapadi
- 1964 – Won BFJA Award for Best Actress for Uttar Phalguni
- 1973 – Won BFJA Award for Best Actress for Alo Amaar Alo
- 1976 – Won BFJA Award for Best Actress (Hindi) for Aandhi
- 1963 – Won 3rd Moscow International Film Festival for Best Actress for Saat Paake Badha (First Indian actress to win an international film festival award)
- 1967 – Nominated Filmfare Award for Best Actress for Mamta
- 1972 – Won Padma Shri for notable contribution in arts
- 1975 – Won Filmfare Awards Bangla for Best Actress for cinema Priyo Bandhabi
- 1976 – Nominated Filmfare Award for Best Actress for Aandhi
- 2012 – Won Banga Bibhushan for lifetime achievement in film acting
- 2014 – Won Filmfare Awards East Lifetime Achievement Award (Posthumous)
