= Anokhi Raat =

1968 Hindi film directed by Asit Sen

- Directed by: Asit Sen
- Written by: Hrishikesh Mukherjee; Anand Kumar
- Produced by: L.B. Lachman
- Starring: Sanjeev Kumar; Zaheeda Hussain; Parikshit Sahni
- Cinematography: Kamal Bose
- Edited by: Tarun Dutta
- Music by: Songs: Roshan; Score: Salil Chowdhury
- Distributed by: L. B. Films
- Release date: 1968
- Country: India
- Language: Hindi

Anokhi Raat (lit. 'Strange Night') is a 1968 Hindi film produced by L. B. Lachman and L. B. Thakur and directed by Asit Sen. The film stars Sanjeev Kumar, Zaheeda Hussain, Aruna Irani, Keshto Mukherjee and Parikshit Sahni. It has music by Roshan and Salil Chowdhury, with the former being the song composer and the latter being the film score composer.

== Plot ==
The events depicted in the film take place on a single night and result in several characters sharing their life stories. It is a fascinating depiction of some of the challenges faced by the poor and by women in Indian society, some of which continue to this day.

== Cast ==
- Sanjeev Kumar as Baldev Singh
- Zaheeda Hussain as Rama / Gopa
- Tarun Bose as Madan Lal
- Aruna Irani as Mrs. Prema Rai
- Parikshit Sahni as Painter
- Anwar Hussain as Ram Das
- Praveen Paul as Orphanage Matron (as Pravin Paul)
- Dev Kishan as Matron's Uncle
- Keshto Mukherjee as Buyer (stammerer)
- Viju Khote as Idle bandit
- Vishwa Mehra as Lakhan Singh (Bandit)
- Brahm Bhardwaj as Madanlal's Lawyer
- Mukri as Naubat
- Badri Prasadas Durga Prasad

== Soundtrack ==
The film score was composed by Salil Chowdhury while the songs featured in the film were composed by Roshan.

#	Song	Singer	Raga	Lyrics
1	"O Re Taal Mile Nadi Ke Jal Mein"	Mukesh	Pilu (raga)	Indeevar
2	"Dulhan Se Tumhara Milan Hoga"	Mukesh		
3	"Mehlon Ka Raja Mila, Tumhari Beti Raaj Karegi"	Lata Mangeshkar		
4	"Mile Na Phool To Kaanto Se Dosti Kar Li"	Mohammed Rafi	Yaman Kalyan	
5	"Mere Beri Ke Ber Mat Todo, Kaanta Chubh Jaayega"	Asha Bhosle		

== Awards ==
- Filmfare Best Art Direction (black & white)- Ajit Bannerjee
- Filmfare Best Cinematographer Award (black & white) - Kamal Bose
- Filmfare Best Screenplay Award- Hrishikesh Mukherjee
- Filmfare Best Dialogue Award- Anand Kumar
