= Mamta (1966 film) =

1966 film by Asit Sen

- Film poster
- Directed by: Asit Sen
- Written by: Krishan Chander (dialogues)
- Story by: Nihar Ranjan Gupta
- Based on: Uttar Falguni (1963)
- Produced by: Charu Chitra
- Starring: Suchitra Sen; Dharmendra; Ashok Kumar
- Cinematography: Anil Gupta
- Edited by: Tarun Dutta
- Music by: Roshan
- Distributed by: Chhayabani
- Release date: 1966
- Running time: 160 minutes
- Country: India
- Language: Hindi
- Box office: est. ₹120 million ($16 million)

Mamta (transl. "Mother's Love") is a 1966 Indian drama film directed by Asit Sen, written by Nihar Ranjan Gupta and Krishan Chander, with music composed by Roshan to lyrics written by Majrooh Sultanpuri. The movie stars Suchitra Sen, Dharmendra and Ashok Kumar. The film about middle class fears and class conflict, has lead actress Suchitra Sen in dual roles.

The film is also noted for its music by Roshan and lyrics by Majrooh Sultanpuri, in songs like, Rahen Na Rahen Hum sung by Lata Mangeshkar and her hit duet, Chuppa Lo Yun Dil Mein Pyar Mera with Hemant Kumar.

The film is a remake of Asit Sen's own Bengali film, Uttar Falguni (1963), also starring Suchitra Sen.

== Plot ==
Monish Rai comes from a wealthy family and is in love with Devayani, who is from a poor family. Monish wants to travel abroad for higher studies, and this will be funded by his family. He fears that his family will not approve of Devayani and will refuse to fund his foreign studies if he makes known his intention to marry her. Therefore, he and Devayani agree to delay their wedding until Monish returns to India.

Financial problems overwhelm Devayani's father not long after Monish leaves for England. He has been taking new loans to repay old loans, and most of these new loans have come from a certain Rakhal, who poses as a friend and well-wisher of Devayani's father. Rakhal is in fact a vile and dissolute man, and he has his eye on the beautiful Devayani. At a timely moment, Rakhal makes his irresistible proposal to Devayani's father. A simple and rather gullible man, Devayani's father thinks that marrying Rakhal would be a good thing for Devayani because Rakhal is a rich man and Devayani will live a comfortable life. He agrees to give his daughter in marriage to Rakhal. A horrified Devayani tells her father that she does not want to marry at all, but to live with him and take care of him in his old age. This cuts no ice at all with the father, and the wedding date is fixed. A desperate Devayani even approaches Monish's mother for financial assistance, but is refused.

The wedding takes place. Rakhal, who is significantly older than Devayani, makes some effort to court her, but she finds him repulsive. Rakhal soon begins to find Devayani's sour and rejectionist attitude tiresome, and he returns to his drinking and gambling cronies. He also resorts to violence when he feels insulted by Devayani's attitude. Rakhal had inherited much wealth from his father, but he is a wastrel with a fondness for drink, cards and girls. He splurges money on his many vices and the truth is that much of his money is now gone. Devayani soon becomes pregnant and gives birth to a baby girl, Suparna. Devayani's father dies just around this time, leaving her with nowhere to turn to for succour. Her husband is briefly put in jail after a drunken brawl at a brothel, and it becomes known that his money is finished. Unhappy with her marriage and her circumstances, Devayani runs away and becomes a devadasi, performing for a male clientele. She is however tracked down by Rakhal, who attempts to kidnap his daughter Suparna on more than one occasion. In order to ensure protection of daughter from father, Devayani leaves Suparna in an orphanage run by Christian missionaries, making the stipulation that Suparna should not be placed for adoption, and that she will contribute for Suparna's upkeep when possible. Devayani relocates and throws herself wholeheartedly into earning a living by singing and dancing for a male audience at a traditional-style kotha (with few, if any, instances of sex work).

Monish returns to the city after completing his education. He has already heard of Devayani's wedding. He is unable to forget her, and he remains unmarried all his life. Once, on the street, he sees a woman who looks like Devayani and calls out to her, but she turns away and quickly sits inside a nearby taxi with no sign of recognition and drives away. Monish is told by others that the person he has seen is a Lucknow-based tawaif, Pannabai.

== Cast ==
- Suchitra Sen in a dual role as
  - Devyani/Pannabai
  - Suparna (Devyani's daughter and Indraneel's girlfriend)
- Dharmendra ... Barrister Indraneel (Suparna's boyfriend)
- Ashok Kumar ... Monish Rai (Devyani's love interest)
- Bipin Gupta ... Kantilal
- David Abraham ... Doctor Abraham
- Tarun Bose ... Mahadev Prasad
- Pahari Sanyal ... Prosecuting Lawyer
- Pratima Devi ... Mother Mary
- Kalipada Chakraborty ... Rakhal Bhattacharya (Devyani's abusive husband and Suparna's father)
- Chhaya Devi ... Minabai
- Rajlakshmi Devi ... Guest at party
- Chaman Puri (uncredited) ... Ghishta Babu (Devyani's father)
- Asit Sen (director) as Mahadev Prasad
- Jahor Roy

== Box office ==
The film performed well at the domestic box office. It was the year's 15th highest-grossing film in India, earning ₹12 million ($1.9 million). This was equivalent to estimated footfalls of approximately 7.2 million tickets sold in India.

The film became an overseas blockbuster in the Soviet Union, selling 52.1 million tickets in 1969, making it the sixth highest-grossing Indian film ever in the Soviet Union. This was equivalent to an estimated 13 million Rbls (Note: 52.1 million tickets sold, average ticket price of 25 kopecks) ($14.4 million, (Note: 0.9 Rbl per US dollar from 1961 to 1971) or ₹108 million). (Note: 7.5 Indian rupees per US dollar from 1967 to 1970)

Combined, the film grossed an estimated ₹120 million ($16.3 million) worldwide. In terms of footfall, the film sold an estimated 59.3 million tickets worldwide.

== Nominations ==
- Filmfare Nomination for Best Film
- Filmfare Nomination for Best Director - Asit Sen
- Filmfare Nomination for Best Actress - Suchitra Sen
- Filmfare Nomination for Best Story - Nihar Ranjan Gupta

== Music ==
The songs of the films were composed by Roshan and written by Majrooh Sultanpuri.

No.	Title	Singer(s)	Length
1.	"Chahe To Mera Jiya Lele"	Lata Mangeshkar	03:53
2.	"Chupa Lo Yun Dil Mein Pyar Mera" (Raga Yaman Kalyan)	Lata Mangeshkar, Hemant Kumar	03:11
3.	"Hum Gavanwa Na Jayibe Ho"	Lata Mangeshkar	04:20
4.	"Instrumental"	–	02:44
5.	"Instrumental"	–	04:05
6.	"Rahen Na Rahen Hum (solo)" (Raga Pahadi)	Lata Mangeshkar	04:24
7.	"Rahen Na Rahen Hum (duet)" (Raga Pahadi)	Mohammed Rafi, Suman Kalyanpur	02:20
8.	"Rahte The Kabhi Jinke"	Lata Mangeshkar	03:43
9.	"In Baharon Mein"	Mohammed Rafi, Asha Bhosle	03:21
