= Hrishikesh Mukherjee =

Indian film director (1922–2006)

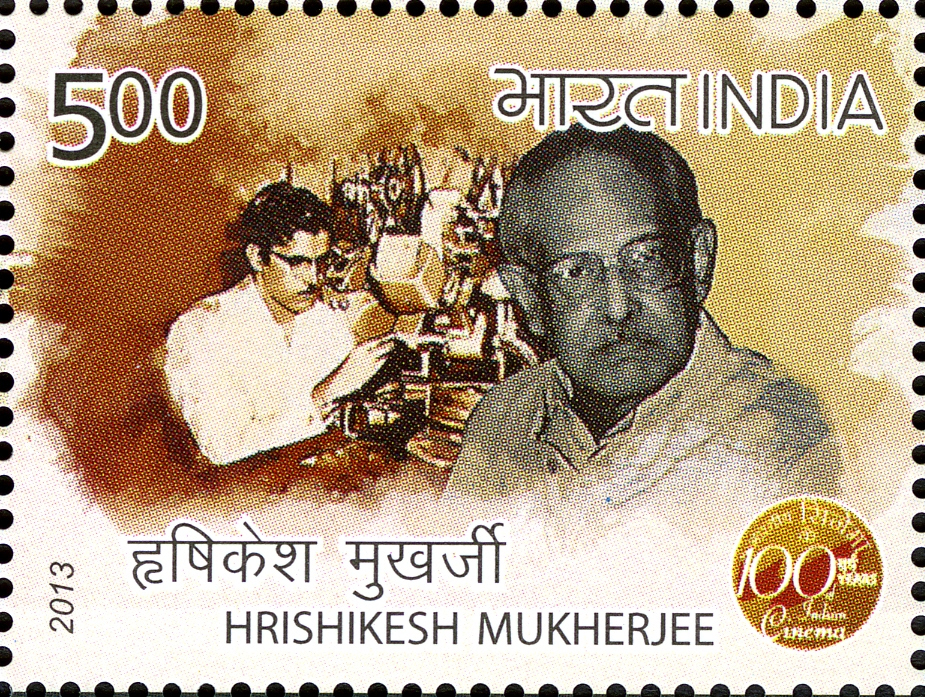
- Mukherjee on a 2013 stamp of India
- Born: 30 September 1922; Calcutta, Bengal Presidency, British India (present-day Kolkata, West Bengal, India)
- Died: 27 August 2006 (aged 83); Mumbai, Maharashtra, India
- Education: University of Calcutta
- Occupations: Film director; editor; screenwriter
- Notable work: Anari; Anupama; Majhli Didi; Satyakam; Anand; Guddi; Chupke Chupke; Chaitali
- Honours: Dada Saheb Phalke Award (1999); Padma Vibhushan (2001)

Hrishikesh Mukherjee (30 September 1922 – 27 August 2006) was an Indian film director, editor and writer. He is regarded as one of the greatest filmmakers of Indian cinema. Popularly known as Hrishi-da, he directed 42 films during his career spanning over four decades, and is named the pioneer of the 'middle cinema' of India. Renowned for his social films that reflected the changing middle-class ethos, Mukherjee "carved a middle path between the extravagance of mainstream cinema and the stark realism of art cinema".

He is known for a number of films, including Anari, Satyakam, Chupke Chupke, Anupama, Anand, Abhimaan, Guddi, Gol Maal, Majhli Didi, Chaitali, Aashirwad, Bawarchi, Khubsoorat, Kissi Se Na Kehna, and Namak Haraam.

He also remained the chairman of the Central Board of Film Certification (CBFC) and of the National Film Development Corporation (NFDC). The Government of India honoured him with the Dada Saheb Phalke Award in 1999 and the Padma Vibhushan in 2001. He received the NTR National Award in 2001 and won eight Filmfare Awards.

== Early life and background ==
Hrishikesh Mukherjee was born in the city of Calcutta (now Kolkata) in pre-independence India to a Bengali Brahmin family. He studied science and graduated in chemistry from the University of Calcutta. He taught mathematics and science for some time before taking up filmmaking as a career.

== Career ==
Mukherjee initially worked as a cameraman, and then film editor, in B. N. Sircar's New Theatres in Calcutta in the late 1940s, where he learned his skills from Subodh Mitter ('Kenchida'), a well known editor at the time. He later worked with Bimal Roy in Mumbai as a film editor and assistant director in 1951, participating in the landmark Roy films Do Bigha Zamin and Devdas.

His debut directorial venture, Musafir (1957), was not a success, but he later received acclaim for his second film Anari in 1959. The film, crew and cast won five Filmfare Awards, with Mukherjee only losing the Best Director Award to his mentor, Bimal Roy.

In the following years, he made numerous films. Some of his most notable films include: Anuradha (1960), Chhaya (1961), Asli-Naqli (1962), Anupama (1966), Aashirwad (1968), Satyakam (1969), Guddi (1971), Anand (1971), Bawarchi (1972), Abhimaan (1973), Namak Haraam (1973), Mili (1975), Chupke Chupke (1975), Alaap (1977), Gol Maal (1979), Khubsoorat (1980) and Bemisal (1982). He was the first to introduce Dharmendra in comedy roles, through Chupke Chupke, and gave Amitabh Bachchan his big break with Anand in 1970, along with Rajesh Khanna, he also introduced Jaya Bhaduri to Hindi cinema in his film Guddi. Having worked with his mentor, Bimal Roy as an editor, in films like Madhumati, he was much sought after as an editor as well.

== Later life ==
In 1999, Mukherjee was honoured with the Dadasaheb Phalke Award by the Government of India. Mukherjee was the chairman of the Central Board of Film Certification and of the National Film Development Corporation. In 2001, he was awarded the Padma Vibhushan, the second highest civilian award for his contribution to Indian cinema by the Government of India. The International Film Festival of India honoured him with a retrospective of his films in November 2005. He holds the distinction of working with many of the top Indian stars since the independence of India in 1947.

His last film was Jhooth Bole Kauwa Kaate. Since his original hero, Amol Palekar, had grown old, he opted to cast Anil Kapoor. He has directed TV serials including Talaash.

== Death ==
In later life, Mukherjee suffered from chronic kidney failure and would go to Lilavati Hospital for dialysis. He was admitted to Lilavati Hospital in Mumbai early on Tuesday, 6 June 2006 after he complained of uneasiness. Mukherjee died a few weeks later on 27 August 2006.

== Personal life ==
Mukherjee was married and has three daughters and two sons. His wife died over three decades before him. His younger brother, Dwarkanath Mukherjee, helped write the screenplay for many of his films. He was an animal lover and had many dogs and occasionally cats at his residence in Bandra, Mumbai. In his final years, Mukherjee was exclusively staying with his servants and pets. Family members and friends would visit him regularly.

== Awards ==
- 2001: Padma Vibhushan by the Government of India
- 2001: NTR National Award
- Rashtriya Kishore Kumar Samman from the Government of Madhya Pradesh for 1997-1998

Berlin International Film Festival

- 1961: Golden Bear: Nomination: Anuradha

Filmfare Awards

- 1956: Filmfare Best Editing Award: Naukari
- 1959: Filmfare Best Editing Award: Madhumati
- 1970: Filmfare Best Screenplay Award: Anokhi Raat
- 1972: Filmfare Best Movie Award: Anand shared with N. C. Sippy
- 1972: Filmfare Best Editing Award: Anand
- 1972: Filmfare Best Story Award: Anand
- 1981: Filmfare Best Movie Award: Khubsoorat shared with N. C. Sippy
- 1994: Filmfare Lifetime Achievement Award – South (1994)

Kerala State Film Awards

- 1970: Kerala State Film Award for Best Editor: Priya
- 1974: Kerala State Film Award for Best Editor: Nellu

National Film Awards

- 1957: Certificate of Merit for Third Best Feature Film in Hindi – Musafir
- 1959: President's Silver Medal for Best Feature Film in Hindi – Anari
- 1960: President's Gold Medal for the All India Best Feature Film – Anuradha
- 1966: President's Silver Medal for Best Feature Film in Hindi – Anupama
- 1968: President's Silver Medal for Best Feature Film in Hindi – Aashirwad
- 1969: President's Silver Medal for Best Feature Film in Hindi – Satyakam
- 1970: President's Silver Medal for Best Feature Film in Hindi – Anand
- 1999: Dada Saheb Phalke Award

== Filmography ==
=== Films as director ===
Year	Film	Notes
1957	Musafir	
1959	Anari	
1960	Anuradha	
1961	Chhaya	
1961	Memdidi	
1962	Asli-Naqli	
1962	Aashiq	
1964	Saanjh Aur Savera	
1966	Anupama	
1966	Gaban	
1966	Do Dil	
1966	Biwi Aur Makan	
1967	Majhli Didi	
1968	Aashirwad	
1968	Chotto Jigyasa	
1969	Satyakam	
1969	Pyar Ka Sapna	
1971	Anand	
1971	Guddi	
1971	Buddha Mil Gaya	
1972	Bawarchi	
1972	Sabse Bada Sukh	
1973	Abhimaan	
1973	Namak Haraam	
1974	Phir Kab Milogi	
1975	Chupke Chupke	
1975	Mili	
1975	Chaitali	
1976	Arjun Pandit	
1977	Alaap	
1977	Kotwal Saab	
1978	Naukri	
1979	Gol Maal	
1979	Jurmana	
1980	Khubsoorat	
1981	Naram Garam	
1982	Bemisal	
1983	Rang Birangi	
1983	Kissise Na Kehna	
1983	Achha Bura	
1985	Jhoothi	
1988	Namumkin	
1998	Jhooth Bole Kauwa Kaate	

=== Films as editor, writer or assistant director ===
Year	Film	Production Function	Notes
1947	Tathapi	Editor	
1950	Pehla Aadmi	Editor, Assistant Director	
1952	Maa	Editor, Assistant Director	
1953	Do Bigha Zamin	Scenario, editor, Assistant Director	
1953	Parineeta	Editor	
1954	Biraj Bahu	Editor	
1955	Devdas	Co-editor with Das Dhaimade	
1955	Garam Coat	Editor	
1958	Madhumati	Editor	
1959	Heera Moti	Editor	
1961	Char Diwari	Editor	
1961	Ganga Jumna	Co-editor with Das Dhaimade	
1965	Chemmeen	Editor	
1968	Mere Hamdam Mere Dost	Editor	
1974	Nellu	Editor	
1970	Dastak	Editor	
1977	Alaap	Story, producer	
1977	Anuroopa	Editor	Kannada Film
1981	Professor Pyarelal	Editor	
1983	Coolie	Editor	

=== TV serials ===
- Hum Hindustani (1986)
- Talaash (1992)
- Dhoop Chhaon
- Rishte
- Ujaale Ki Or
- Agar Aisa Ho Toh
