= Asit Sen (director) =

Film director

- Born: 24 September 1922; Bikrampur, Bengal Presidency, British India
- Died: 25 August 2001 (aged 78); Kolkata, West Bengal, India
- Occupations: Film director, screenwriter
- Years active: 1948–1983
- Spouse: Rekha Sen

Asit Sen (24 September 1922 – 25 August 2001) was an Indian film director, cinematographer, documentary Filmmaker and screenwriter, who worked in both Bengali and Hindi cinema. He was born in Dhaka, British India. He directed 17 feature films in Hindi and Bengali, and was most known for the films Deep Jweley Jai (1959) and Uttar Falguni (1963) in Bengali, Mamta (1966), Khamoshi (1969), Anokhi Raat (1968) and Safar (1970) in Hindi.

== Career ==
Remembered as a prominent filmmaker of his times with a career of more than four decades, making films in different Indian languages, Asit Sen's contribution in Indian cinema deserves a special mention along with other stalwarts of that era. He is not to be mistaken with actor (Asit Sen). Born September 24, 1922, in Atishahi village in Bikrampur, Dhaka, Sen was a child with a keen interest towards art. Post his schooling in Nagaon (Assam) he shifted to (Kolkata) for further studies, and in his youth he got drawn towards photography. With the help of his uncle Ramanand Sengupta, who was an established cinematographer, Asit Sen started attending shootings of Hindi films and then joined Bharat Laxmi Productions as an assistant to D.K. Mehta. Soon he became an assistant to his uncle in Purbarag (1947) and then later went on to become an independent filmmaker.

Following his passion, Sen first made a documentary following Mahatma Gandhi's tours in Noakhali and Patna. With the confidence gained, he then made his directorial debut with the Assamese language film Biplabi in 1948. A few years later he made his first Bengali film Chalachal in 1956, starring Arundhati Devi, which was a success, and many years later he remade the film in Hindi as Safar, which was also a hit. In 1959, he made Deep Jweley Jai (1959), starring Suchitra Sen, set in a psychiatric hospital, which again he remade in Hindi as Khamoshi in 1969, with Rajesh Khanna and Waheeda Rehman. In Mamta (1966), a remake of his 1963 Bengali film Uttar Falguni, a story about class conflict, he excelled as a storyteller. The film had lead actress Suchitra Sen in a double role, and featured memorable songs, "Rahein Na Rahein Hum", sung by Lata Mangeshkar and her soft, almost spiritual duet "Chhupa Lo Yoon Dil Mein Pyar Mera", with Hemant Kumar. Asit Sen then joined National Institute of Film and Fine Arts in 1993 as a teacher and till his death he served in film education for society.

Sen worked with some of the most prominent actors in Bollywood during his career. As director of Khamoshi (1969), he directed Rajesh Khanna, and in Sharafat (1970) he directed Dharmendra, Hema Malini and Ashok Kumar. In the unique themed movie Annadata (1972), he directed Om Prakash and Jaya Bachchan. In Maa Aur Mamta (1970), he directed Ashok Kumar. in Mamta (1966) Suchitra Sen, Ashok Kumar and Dharmendra. Another engaging story was Bairaag where Asit Sen directed Helen, Madan Puri and Kader Khan, and in Anari (1975), he directed actors Shashi Kapoor, Sharmila Tagore, Moushumi Chatterjee and Kabir Bedi.

Sen was nominated twice for Filmfare Best Director Award, and won once. He was nominated for his direction of Mamta in 1967, and won the award in 1971 for Safar, which starred Rajesh Khanna, Sharmila Tagore and Feroz Khan.

Asit Sen died at a Kolkata hospital on 25 August 2001 at the age of 79. He was survived by his only son Partha Sen.

== Filmography ==
=== Hindi and Bengali ===
Year	Film	Language	Notes
1948	Biplabi	Assamese	
1950	Pehla Aadmi	Hindi	as assistant screenwriter
1956	Parivar	Hindi	First Hindi film as a director; produced by Bimal Roy
1956	Chalachal	Bengali	Remade in Hindi as Safar in 1970.
1957	Panchatapa	Bengali	
1957	Jonakir Alo	Bengali	
1959	Deep Jweley Jai	Bengali	The movie was remade in Hindi in 1969 as Khamoshi.
1963	Uttar Falguni	Bengali	At the 11th National Film Awards, the film was awarded National Film Award for Best Feature Film in Bengali.
1966	Mamta	Hindi	Remake of Uttar Falguni
1968	Anokhi Raat	Hindi	
1969	Khamoshi	Hindi	Remake of Deep Jweley Jai
1970	Maa Aur Mamta	Hindi	
1970	Safar	Hindi	Remake of 1956 Bengali film Chalachal.
1970	Sharafat	Hindi	
1972	Anokha Daan	Hindi	
1972	Annadata	Hindi	
1975	Anari	Hindi	
1976	Bairaag	Hindi	
1982	Vakil Babu	Hindi	
1983	Mehndi	Hindi	
1984	Prarthana	Bengali	

== Awards ==
- 1963 National Film Award for Best Feature Film in Bengali: Uttar Falguni.
- 1971: Filmfare Award for Best Director: Safar
