= Rajesh Khanna filmography =

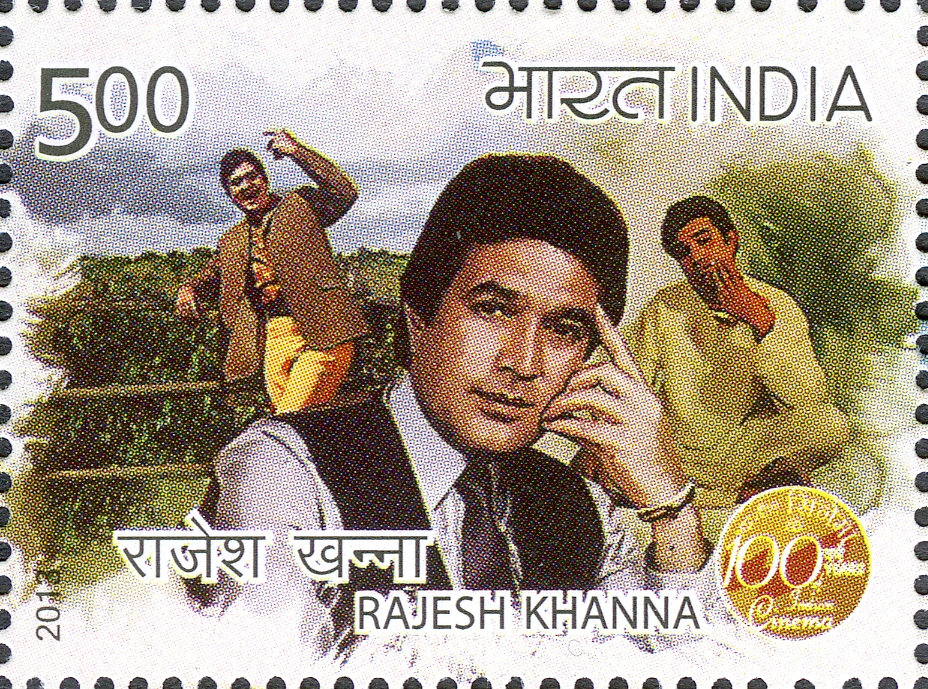
Khanna on a 2013 stamp of India

Rajesh Khanna (born Jatin Khanna; 29 December 1942 – 18 July 2012) was an Indian actor, politician and film producer who is known for his work in Hindi cinema. He starred in 17 consecutive successes from 1969 to 1971. He won the Filmfare Award for Best Actor three times and the BFJA Awards for Best Actor (Hindi) four times, received the Filmfare Special Award in 1991, and was awarded the Filmfare Lifetime Achievement Award in 2005. Khanna has been called the first 'superstar' of Indian cinema.

== Films ==
Year	Title	Director	Role	Notes	Ref.
1966	Aakhri Khat	Chetan Anand	Govind		
1967	Raaz	Ravindra Dave	Kumar/Sunil (Note: Khanna played two characters.)		
1967	Aurat	S. S. Balan, S. S. Vasan	Suresh		
1967	Baharon Ke Sapne	Nasir Hussain	Ram		
1969	Doli	A Subba Rao	Amar Kumar		
1969	Ittefaq	Yash Chopra	Dilip Roy		
1969	Aradhana	Shakti Samanta	Flight Lt. Arun Verma/ Suraj Verma		
1969	Do Raaste	Raj Khosla	Satyan Gupta		
1969	Khamoshi	Asit Sen	Arun Choudhury (Patient #24)		
1969	Bandhan	Narendra Bedi	Dharmchand (Dharma)		
1970	The Train	Ravikant Nagaich	CID Inspector Shyam Kumar		
1970	Sachaa Jhutha	Manmohan Desai	Bhola/Ranjeet Kumar		
1970	Safar	Asit Sen	Avinash		
1970	Aan Milo Sajna	Mukul Dutt	Ajit		
1971	Mehboob Ki Mehndi	H. S. Rawail	Yusuf		
1971	Kati Patang	Shakti Samanta	Kamal Sinha		
1971	Anand	Hrishikesh Mukherjee	Anand Sehgal		
1971	Andaz	Ramesh Sippy	Raj		
1971	Haathi Mere Saathi	M. A. Thirumugam	Raj Kumar (Raju)		
1971	Maryada	Arabind Sen	Raja Babu / Rajan Ram Bahadur		
1971	Chhoti Bahu	K. B. Tilak	Madhu		
1971	Badnaam Farishte	Qamar Narvi	Lawyer Prakash	Special appearance	
1971	Guddi	Hrishikesh Mukherjee	Himself	Cameo	
1972	Dushman	Dulal Guha	Surjit Singh		
1972	Amar Prem	Shakti Samanta	Anand Babu		
1972	Apna Desh	Jambu	Akash Chandra		
1972	Dil Daulat Duniya	Prem Narayan Arora	Vijay		
1972	Bawarchi	Hrishikesh Mukherjee	Raghunandan		
1972	Joroo Ka Ghulam	A. Bhimsingh	Rajesh/Neelkanth/Mundu		
1972	Shehzada	K. Shankar	Rajesh		
1972	Mere Jeevan Saathi	Ravikant Nagaich	Prakash		
1972	Maalik	A. Bhimsingh	Karan		
1972	Anuraag	Shakti Samanta	Gangaram	Special appearance	
1973	Raja Rani	Sachin Bhowmick	Raja		
1973	Daag: A Poem of Love	Yash Chopra	Sunil Kohli / Sudhir		
1973	Namak Haraam	Hrishikesh Mukherjee	Somnath Chander Singh (Somu)		
1973	Bangaru Babu	V. B. Rajendra Prasad	Himself	Special appearance	
1974	Humshakal	Jambulingam	Ram/Lakshman		
1974	Aap Ki Kasam	J. Om Prakash	Kamal Bhatnagar		
1974	Prem Nagar	K. S. Prakash Rao	Kunwar Karan Singh		
1974	Ajanabee	Shakti Samanta	Rohit Kumar Saxena		
1974	Avishkaar	Basu Bhattacharya	Amar		
1974	Roti	Manmohan Desai	Mangal Singh		
1974	Aaina	K. Balachander	Ashok	Special appearance	
1974	Badhti Ka Naam Dadhi	Kishore Kumar	Himself	Cameo	
1975	Prem Kahani	Raj Khosla	Rajesh Kamleshwar Narain		
1975	Aakraman	J. Om Prakash	Karan Singh	Special appearance	
1976	Maha Chor	Narendra Bedi	Raju Khan / Rajeshwar A. Singh / Johnny Fernandes		
1976	Sawa Lakh Se Ek Ladaun	Dara Singh	Qawwali Singer	Cameo	
1976	Mehbooba	Shakti Samanta	Prakash / Suraj		
1976	Ginny Aur Johnny	Mehmood	Inspector	Cameo	
1976	Bundal Baaz	Shammi Kapoor	Rajaram (Raja)		
1977	Anurodh	Shakti Samanta	Arun Choudhury / Sanjay / Pritam Nath Ghayal		
1977	Tyaag	Din Dayal Sharma	Chetan		
1977	Chhailla Babu	Joy Mukherjee	Chhailla Babu		
1977	Karm	B. R. Chopra	Arvind Kumar		
1977	Chalta Purza	Bhappi Sonie	Amar Gupta		
1977	Hatyara	Surendra Mohan	Himself	Cameo	
1977	Palkon Ki Chhaon Mein	Meraj	Ravi Raj Sinha		
1977	Aashiq Hoon Baharon Ka	J. Om Prakash	Ashok Sharma		
1977	Tinku		Sher Khan	Cameo	
1978	Bhola Bhala	Satpal	Ram Kumar Verma / Nathu Singh		
1978	Naukri	Hrishikesh Mukherjee	Ranjit Gupta (Ronu)		
1978	Chakravyuha		Amit Narayan		
1978	Prem Bandhan		Kishan / Mohan Khanna		
1979	Janata Havaldar		Constable Janta Prasad		
1979	Amar Deep		Raja / Sonu		
1979	Muqabla		Qawwali Singer	Cameo	
1980	Red Rose		Anand		
1980	Thodisi Bewafaii		Arun Kumar Choudhary		
1980	Phir Wahi Raat		Dr. Vijay		
1980	Aanchal		Shambhu		
1980	Bandish		Kishan		
1981	Kudrat		Mohan Kapoor/Madhav		
1981	Dhanwan		Vijay Kumar Saxena		
1981	Dard		Deepak Srivastav/ Advocate Vicky Srivastav		
1981	Fiffty Fiffty		Kishan Singh		
1981	Khoon Aur Paani		Himself	Cameo	
1981	Naseeb		Himself	Cameo	
1982	Disco Dancer		Master Raju	Special appearance	
1982	Dil-E-Nadaan		Anand		
1982	Rajput		SP Dhirendra Singh		
1982	Ashanti		Chandra Singh		
1982	Dharam Kanta		Thakur Ram Singh/Shankar		
1982	Jaanwar		Raju		
1982	Suraag		Qawwali Singer	Cameo	
1983	Nishaan		Shankar Singh		
1983	Avtaar		Avtaar Kishen		
1983	Souten		Shyam Mohit		
1983	Agar Tum Na Hote		Ashok Mehra		
1984	Aaj Ka M.L.A. Ram Avtar		Ram Avtar		
1984	Maqsad		Rajeshwar		
1984	Asha Jyoti		Deepak Chander		
1984	Dharm Aur Qanoon		Justice Diwan / Rajan		
1984	Naya Kadam		Ramu		
1984	Awaaz	Shakti Samanta	Advocate Jayant		
1984	Paapi Pet Ka Sawaal Hai		Mohan/Sheik/Shankar Rao/ Sardar		
1985	Zamana		Inspector Vinod Kumar		
1985	Hum Dono		Raja/Dr. Shekhar		
1985	Masterji		Raju		
1985	Bewafai		Ashok Nath		
1985	Durgaa		Mohan Babu	Special appearance	
1985	Aakhir Kyon?		Alok Nath		
1985	Alag Alag	Shakti Samanta	Neeraj		
1985	Babu		Babu		
1985	Oonche Log		Rai Bahadur Rajdev Singh		
1985	Insaaf Main Karoonga		Captain Ravi Khanna		
1985	Awara Baap		Raj		
1986	Amrit		Amritlal Sharma (Amrit)		
1986	Nasihat		Rajesh Verma		
1986	Anokha Rishta		Robert Brown Bob		
1986	Shatru		Ashok Sharma		
1986	Adhikar		Vishal		
1986	Mohabbat Ki Kasam		Krishna	Special appearance	
1986	Angaaray		Ravi	Special appearance	
1987	Nazrana		Rajat Verma		
1987	Awam		Captain Amar Kumar		
1987	Sitapur Ki Geeta		Ramu	Special appearance	
1988	Vijay		Ajit Bhardwaj		
1988	Woh Phir Aayegi		Raju		
1989	Paap Ka Ant		DCP Khanna	Special appearance	
1989	Ghar Ka Chiraag		Kumar		
1989	Mamta Ki Chhaon Mein				
1989	Main Tera Dushman		Truck Driver	Cameo	
1990	Swarg		Mr. Kumar		
1991	Begunaah		Jeevanlal		
1991	Rupaye Dus Karod		Ravi Varma		
1991	Ghar Parivar		Shanker		
1994	Khudai		Raj Anand		
1996	Sautela Bhai		Master Tulsiram		
1999	Aa Ab Laut Chalen		Balraj Khanna		
2001	Pyaar Zindagi Hai		Hridaynath		
2002	Kyaa Dil Ne Kahaa		Siddharth		
2006	Jaana-Let's Fall in Love		Hamid		
2008	Wafa: A Deadly Love Story		Amritlal Chopra		
2010	Do Dilon Ke Khel Mein		Joginder Singh		
2012	Jaanleva Black Blood		CID		
2014	Riyasat		Godfather Don Saheb		

== Shelved and unreleased projects ==
Year	Title	Shelved/unreleased	Notes
1979	Majnoon	Shelved	Also producer
1979	Bebus	Shelved	
1980	Sapne Apne Apne	Shelved	
1981	Dushman Dost	Unreleased	
1985	Bayen Haath Ka Khel	Unreleased	
1986	Waapsi	Shelved	
1987	Goraa	Unreleased	
1989	Police Ke Peechhe Police	Unreleased	
1990	Jai Shiv Shankar	Unreleased	Also producer
1990	Ghar Ka Ujala	Unreleased	Cameo appearance
1995	Kis Kaam Ke Yeh Rishte	Unreleased	
2009	First Time - Pehli Baar	Shelved	Cameo appearance
2009	Blackmailer	Shelved	
2010	Vijay - Winner All the Way	Shelved	Cameo appearance
2011	Six December	Shelved	Cameo appearance

== Television ==
Year	Title	Role	Channel
2001–2003	Ittefaq	Mr. Gopal	Zee TV
2000-2002	Apne Parai	N/A	B4U
2007-2008	Bhabhi Maa	N/A	Star Plus
2008–2009	Raghukul Reet Sada Chali Aayi	N/A	DD National

== Producer ==
Year	Film	Director
1985	Alag Alag	Shakti Samanta
1989	Police Ke Peeche Police	B. R. Ishara

== Discography ==
Year	Song	Film	Co-singer	Source
1967	"O Mere Sajna O Mere Balma"	Baharon Ke Sapne	With Lata Mangeshkar	
1974	"Bheegi Bheegi Raaton Mein"	Ajanabee	With Kishore Kumar and Lata Mangeshkar	
1969	"Baagon Mein Bahaar Hai"	Aradhana	With Rafi and Lata Mangeshkar	
1970	"Nadiya Chale Chale Re Dhara"	Safar	With Manna Dey	
1972	"Raina Beeti Jaaye"	Amar Prem	With Lata Mangeshkar	
1972	"Rimjhim Rimjhim Dekho Baras Rahee Hai"	Shehzada	With Kishore Kumar and Lata Mangeshkar	
1972	"Naa Jaeeyo Naa Jaeeyo Chhod Ke Naa Jaiyo Meri Rani"	Shehzada	With Kishore Kumar and Lata Mangeshkar	
1973	"Haan To Main Kya"	Raja Rani	With Mukesh and Lata Mangeshkar	
1973	"Main To Kuchh Bhi Nahin"	Daag: A Poem of Love		
1974	"Ik Ajnabi Haseena Se Yun Mulaqat"	Ajanabee	With Kishore Kumar	
1975	"Mahan Shunya Ke Mahan Vistar Mein"	Avishkaar		
1977	"Ladkadane Do Mujhe"	Palkon Ki Chhaon Mein	With Kishore Kumar	
