= List of awards and nominations received by Rajesh Khanna =

List of Best Actor awards for Rajesh Khanna excluding Lifetime Achievement Awards and Civilian Awards
Award	Wins	Nominations
All-India Critics Association (AICA) Best Actor Awards	7	10
Bengal Film Journalists' Association – Best Actor Awards (Hindi)	4	25
Best Actors	3	14
Filmfare Special Guest Actor Award	1	1
Filmfare Special Award	1	1
Winner Lions Club	1	1
Russian Film festival	1	1

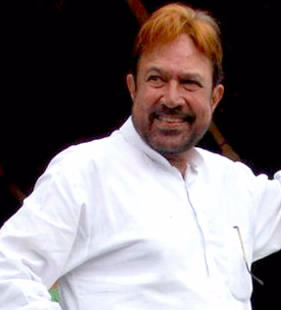
Khanna in September 2011

Rajesh Khanna (born Jatin Khanna; 29 December 1942 – 18 July 2012) was an Indian actor, film producer and politician. He won seven All-India Critics Association (AICA) Best Actor awards, and received 10 nominations. He won four Best Actor awards in the Bengal Film Journalists' Association Awards, and received 25 nominations. He won three Filmfare Awards for Best Actor, one Filmfare Special Award in 1973, and received a Filmfare Special Award in 1991, after 25 years in the Hindi film industry. He received the Filmfare Lifetime Achievement Award at the 50th Filmfare Awards in 2005.

He was posthumously awarded the Padma Bhushan, India's third highest civilian award, in 2013.

== Civilian Awards ==
- 2013 – Padma Bhushan (Posthumously)

== Filmfare Awards ==
Winner

- 1971 – Best Actor for Sachaa Jhutha
- 1972 – Best Actor for Anand
- 1973 – Special Award for Anuraag
- 1975 – Best Actor for Avishkaar
- 1991 – Special Award for completing 25 years in the Indian Film Industry.
- 2005 – Lifetime Achievement Award (Golden Jubilee function)

Nominated

- 1970 – Best Actor for Aradhana
- 1970 – Best Actor for Ittefaq
- 1972 – Best Actor for Kati Patang
- 1973 – Best Actor for Dushman
- 1973 – Best Actor for Amar Prem
- 1974 – Best Actor for Daag: A Poem of Love
- 1975 – Best Actor for Prem Nagar
- 1980 – Best Actor for Amar Deep
- 1981 – Best Actor for Thodisi Bewafaii
- 1982 – Best Actor for Dard
- 1984 – Best Actor for Avtaar

== Bengal Film Journalists' Association Awards ==
Rajesh Khanna won 4 Bengal Film Journalists' Association Awards for Best Actor.

Winner

- 1972 – Best Actor for Anand
- 1973 – Best Actor for Bawarchi
- 1974 – Best Actor for Namak Haraam
- 1987 – Best Actor for Amrit

== Stardust Awards ==
Winner

- 2005 – Pride of Film Industry Award'

== International Indian Film Academy Awards ==
Winner

- 2009 – Lifetime Achievement Award

== Tamil Cine World Awards ==
Winner

- 2009 – All India Film Workers Association Life Time Achievement Award

== Pune International Film Festival (PIFF) ==
Winner

- 2010 – Lifetime Achievement Award

== Bollywood Movie Awards ==
Winner

- 2004 – Lifetime of Glamour award at the Kingfisher Bollywood Fashion Awards
- 2004 – Lifetime Achievement Award at the Bollywood Awards held in US

== Zee Cine Awards ==
Winner

- 2001 – Zee Cine Lifetime Achievement Award for Contribution to Indian Cinema

== Sansui Film Awards ==
Winner

- 2001 – Lifetime Achievement Awards at the 3rd Sansui Film Awards held at the Indira Gandhi Indoor Stadium

== All India Critics Association Awards ==
Winner

- 1985 – All-India Critics Association (AICA) Award for Best Actor for Aaj Ka M.L.A. Ram Avtar

== Apsara Film & Television Producers Guild Awards ==
Winner

- 2012 – Lifetime Achievement Award for Major Contribution to Indian Cinema by the Film and Television Producers Guild Association

== Other awards ==
Winner

- 1982 – Winner Lions Club, New Delhi – Best Actor for Dard
- 1994 – Winner Russian Film Festival, Ujvegistan – Best Actor for Khudai
- 2003 – Maharashtra State Government's Raj Kapoor Awards presented on 30 April 2003
- 2006 – Yugantar Gaurav Puraskar 2006 awarded by Chandibai Himmatmal Mansukhani (CHM) College as part of the Gaurav Diwas celebrations on 4 February 2006
- 2006 – Award for Outstanding Contribution to Indian Cinema at the 2006 Bollywood Movie Awards held on 10 June, at the Centre of Excellence, Macoya, Trinidad and Tobago
- Glory of India Award by IIFS, London
- Mother Teresa Award
- Bharat Jyoti National Award

=== Kala Ratna Award ===
- 1995 – Kala Ratna Award by Punjabi Kala Sangam at Delhi by the then Human Resource Development Minister Arjun Singh
