= Rajesh Khanna =

Indian actor, film producer and politician (1942–2012)

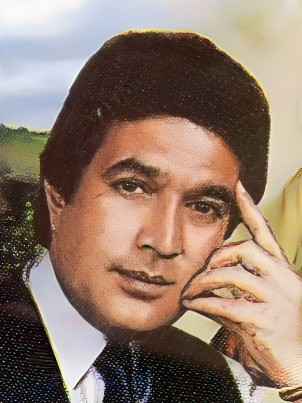
- Khanna in 1983
- Born: Jatin Khanna; 29 December 1942; Amritsar, Punjab, British India (present-day Punjab, India)
- Died: 18 July 2012 (aged 69); Mumbai, Maharashtra, India
- Education: Kishinchand Chellaram College
- Occupations: Actor; film producer; politician
- Years active: 1966–2012
- Works: Full list
- Political party: Indian National Congress (I)
- Spouse: Dimple Kapadia (m. 1973; sep. 1982)
- Partners: Anju Mahendru (1967–1972); Tina Munim (1984–1987); Anita Advani (2000s–2012)
- Children: Twinkle; Rinke
- Relatives: Akshay Kumar (son-in-law); Simple Kapadia (sister-in-law)
- Awards: Full list
- Honours: Padma Bhushan (2013)

Member of Parliament, Lok Sabha
- In office June 1992 – 9 May 1996
- Preceded by: L. K. Advani
- Succeeded by: Jagmohan
- Constituency: New Delhi, Delhi
- Majority: 28,256 (14.59%)

Rajesh Khanna (pronounced [ɾɑːd͡ʒeːʃ kʰənnɑː]; born Jatin Khanna; 29 December 1942 – 18 July 2012) was an Indian actor, film producer and politician who worked in Hindi films. Regarded as one of the greatest and most successful actors in the history of Indian cinema, he is considered the first Superstar of Hindi cinema. His accolades include five Filmfare Awards, and in 2013, he was posthumously awarded the Padma Bhushan, India's third highest civilian honour.

Khanna made his acting debut in 1966 with Aakhri Khat, which was India's first official Academy Awards entry in 1967. Khanna saw his rise to superstardom in 1969 with romantic musical Aradhana starring Sharmila Tagore. The film went to become a massive blockbuster at the box office and made him an overnight sensation. The same year, romantic family drama Do Raaste opposite Mumtaz also released. These films turned Khanna into a Superstar and marked the beginning of Rajesh Khanna Mania of the early-1970s. He continued his domination at the box office in 1970 and 1971 with films, such as – The Train, Sachaa Jhutha, Safar, Aan Milo Sajna, Kati Patang, Mehboob Ki Mehndi, Anand, Andaz, Maryada, Haathi Mere Saathi, Chhoti Bahu and Khamoshi, eventually giving 17 consecutive successes in a span of three years, a record which remains unbroken to date.

In 2005, he was honoured with the Filmfare Lifetime Achievement Award on the 50th anniversary of the Filmfare Awards. He was a Member of Parliament in the 10th Lok Sabha from New Delhi Lok Sabha constituency between 1992 and 1996, elected in the 1992 New Delhi by-election as an Indian National Congress candidate. He married Dimple Kapadia in March 1973, eight months before her debut film Bobby was released and had two daughters from the marriage. Their older daughter Twinkle Khanna is a former actress, who is married to actor Akshay Kumar, while their younger daughter Rinke Khanna is also a former actress. Khanna died on 18 July 2012, after a period of illness.

== Early life and background ==
Rajesh Khanna was born on 29 December 1942, in Amritsar, in the Punjab Province of British India (now in Punjab, India), as 'Jatin Khanna' into a Punjabi Hindu Khatri family. He was adopted and raised by Chunnilal Khanna and Leelawati Khanna, who were relatives of his biological parents.

Khanna's biological parents were Lala Hiranand Khanna and Chandrani Khanna. His father had migrated from the Vehari District in West Punjab (now in Pakistan) to Gali Tiwarian in Amritsar. Lala worked as headmaster of the MC High School in Burewala. His adoptive parents belonged to a family of railway contractors who had moved from Lahore to Bombay in 1935. Khanna lived in Saraswati Niwas in Thakur-dwar, near Girgaon, Mumbai.

Khanna attended St. Sebastian's Goan High School with his friend Ravi Kapoor, who later took the stage name Jeetendra. Khanna gradually started taking an interest in theatre, did many stage and theatre plays in his school and college days, and won many prizes in inter-college drama competitions.

In 1962 Khanna played a wounded mute soldier in the play Andha Yug and impressed with his performance; the chief guest suggested that he get into films soon. Khanna became a rare newcomer who had his own MG sports car, who once struggled to get work in theatre and films in the early 1960s.

Khanna did his first two years of Bachelor of Arts at Nowrosjee Wadia College in Pune from 1959 to 1961. He later studied at Kishinchand Chellaram College, Mumbai and Jeetendra studied at Siddharth Jain College. Khanna tutored Jeetendra for his first film audition. Khanna's uncle KK Talwar changed Khanna's first name to Rajesh when he decided to enter films. His friends and his wife called him Kaka (meaning a baby faced boy in Punjabi).

== Acting career ==
=== Early works (1966–1968) ===
Rajesh Khanna was one of eight finalists from more than 10,000 contestants in the 1965 All India Talent Contest, organised by United Producers and Filmfare, along with other FTII students Subhash Ghai and Dheeraj Kumar. Khanna won the contest along with Farida Jalal. Vinod Mehra was also among the finalists. Rajesh Khanna won the contest by one point. BR Chopra, Bimal Roy, GP Sippy, HS Rawail, Nasir Husain, J.Om Prakash, Mohan Saigal, Shakti Samanta and Subodh Mukherji and others had created the United Producers organisation and were then judges of the contest.

He made his film debut in the 1966 film Aakhri Khat, directed by Chetan Anand, followed by Raaz (1967), directed by Ravindra Dave, both of which were a part of his predetermined prize for winning the All-India United Producers' Talent Competition. G.P. Sippy and Nasir Hussain were the first to sign Khanna after he won the contest.

"Though 'Aakhri Khat' is my first film, I received my first break as a leading actor in Ravindra Dave's, 'Raaz', in 1967. My heroine was Babita, already a popular actress then. Though I had lots of confidence, I was shy in facing the camera initially. In my first three shots, I had to perform with stress on my body language and dialogue delivery. Though I was right with my dialogues, my movements were not up to the mark. Ravindra Dave explained me my scenes and movements very clearly correcting my way of walking."

— Khanna's remarks after Aakhri Khat was India's entry for the Best Foreign Language Film at the 40th Oscar Academy Awards in 1967.

Being under contract with United Producers, he got projects, such as Aurat (1967) and Baharon Ke Sapne (1967), of which latter did break even and the former was commercially successful.

=== Superstardom (1969–1975) ===
The year 1969 proved to be a game changer for Khanna and saw his rise to superstardom. It began with Shakti Samanta's romantic musical Aradhana starring Sharmila Tagore. The film went to become a massive blockbuster at the box office and made him an overnight sensation. Its soundtrack composed by S. D. Burman and lyrics written by Anand Bakshi was the third best-selling Hindi film album of the 1960s and made Kishore Kumar the leading playback singer of Hindi cinema. That same year, he starred in Raj Khosla's romantic family drama Do Raaste opposite Mumtaz. Backed up with chartbuster songs, including "Yeh Reshmi Zulfen", "Bindiya Chamkegi", "Chup Gaye Saare Nazaare", it went on to become a Blockbuster, in turn making Khanna and Mumtaz a hit pair. In the United Kingdom, the film was released in 1970. It became the first Indian film to gross £100,000 in the UK, equivalent to ₹900,000 (US$118,940.64). Its UK box office record was broken a year later by Purab Aur Paschim, which released in the UK in 1971. The huge box office success of Aradhana and Do Raaste was followed by a superhit in Narendra Bedi's romantic drama Bandhan again with Mumtaz, a hit in Yash Chopra's songless mystery thriller Ittefaq co-starring Nanda, followed by another successful film, Doli alongside Babita to go with the major grossers. These films turned Khanna into a Superstar and marked the beginning of Rajesh Khanna Mania of the early-1970s. He continued his domination at the box office in 1970 and 1971 with films, such as – The Train, Sachaa Jhutha, Safar, Aan Milo Sajna, Kati Patang, Mehboob Ki Mehndi, Anand, Andaz, Maryada, Haathi Mere Saathi, Chhoti Bahu and Khamoshi, eventually giving 17 consecutive successes in a span of three years, a record which remains unbroken to date. Khanna won his first Filmfare Award for Best Actor for playing a double role in Sachaa Jhutha. He won his second Filmfare Award for Best Actor and first BFJA Award for Best Actor (Hindi) for portraying a cancer-patient in Anand which is also considered his career-best performance by many of his fans as well as critics.

Khanna began the next year with Dulal Guha's drama film Dushmun. It opened to excellent audience response and emerged a blockbuster as well as one of the highest-earning films of the year. Dushmun was later remade in Tamil, Telugu, Malayalam and Kannada. For portraying a rash truck driver in the film, Khanna received a nomination in the Filmfare Award for Best Actor category. His next release, the action drama Apna Desh also performed very well at the box office. It also had some highly popular songs like "Duniya Mein Logon Ko", "Kajra Lagake Gajra Sajake", "Ro Na Kabhi Nahin Rona". In the late 1972, Khanna's amazing run came to an abrupt halt with release of Badnaam Farishte. As per the book The Most Versatile Superstar Actor of Hindi Cinema, he had 10 hits in 1972 which included Shehzada, Mere Jeevan Saathi, Bawarchi, Apna Desh, Amar Prem, Joroo Ka Ghulam, Bangaru Babu, Anuraag except Maalik which was box office flop. Out of them, Hrishikesh Mukherjee's musical comedy drama Bawarchi, a remake of Tapan Sinha's 1966 Bengali film Galpo Holeo Satti, is regarded as a cult classic today and was remade as an inspiration in Hindi itself. It also won Khanna his second BFJA Award for Best Actor (Hindi). In 1973, his first release was Sachin Bhowmick's romantic drama Raja Rani in which he starred alongside his Aradhana co-star Sharmila Tagore which ended up as a commercially successful venture. Khanna then played a brief role in Samanta's Anuraag, which went on to become a blockbuster and won him Filmfare Special Award. After this, he reunited with Tagore for Yash Chopra's maiden production and sixth directional venture Daag: A Poem of Love which also had Rakhee in the lead. Inspired from Thomas Hardy's novel The Mayor of Casterbridge, it was a major critical and commercial success, eventually emerging a blockbuster and laying the foundation of Yash Raj Films (which is the biggest production house in India till today). Its soundtrack composed by Laxmikant–Pyarelal dominated the musical charts and was one of the best-selling Hindi film albums of the 1970s. His final release that year was the social drama film Namak Haraam, which also received positive response and was superhit at the box office. Khanna received his fifth nomination in the best actor category at the Filmfare Awards for Daag and won his third BFJA Award for Best Actor (Hindi) for Namak Haraam. 1974 was a great year for Khanna with both critical and commercial appreciation coming his way. His first film Humshakal did not do well, but his second release Aap Ki Kasam which was also J. Om Prakash's debut as a filmmaker proved to be a superhit. All of its songs were major hits too, especially "Zindagi Ke Safar Mein Guzar Jate Hain Jo Maqaam" sung by Kishore Kumar. This was followed by Prem Nagar which was a remake of Akkineni Nageswara Rao's all time Telugu hit Prema Nagar (1971). Prem Nagar opened to excellent response from the audience, eventually doing more business than Khanna's last major hit Aap Ki Kasam and emerging a blockbuster. Basu Bhattacharya's art-house film Avishkaar and Shakti Samanta's crime thriller Ajanabee were his next two releases. Both Ajanabee and Avishkaar did reasonable business, the later again opposite Sharmila Tagore earned huge critical acclaim and won Khanna his third Filmfare Award for Best Actor for his subtle portrayal of a disillusioned husband. His last film of the year was Manmohan Desai's action drama Roti which released alongside another biggie Roti Kapada Aur Makaan, but still went on to become a blockbuster. Due to its huge success, Roti was also remade in Telugu as Neram Nadi Kadu Akalidi (1976).

=== Career downfall (1976–1978) ===
The declaration of emergency in 1975 had angered the masses and this helped films having the lead character revolting against corruption and establishment to become successes. The shift from romantic and social movies to action oriented multi-starrers changed the box office equation and saw the emergence of another rival Superstar in the form of Amitabh Bachchan. When coincidentally some of his good films faced commercial failures, Khanna suffered a major career setback from 1976 to 1978.

In 1975, Khanna starred alongside Shashi Kapoor and Mumtaz in Raj Khosla's Prem Kahani and did a guest appearance in the war film Aakraman. The former emerged a box office hit, but his contemporaries, including Bachchan and Dharmendra had bigger hits with Sholay, Deewaar, Pratiggya and Chupke Chupke, which were also among the top 5 highest-grossing films of the year. The following year, he reunited with Hema Malini for Shakti Samanta's highly anticipated romantic drama Mehbooba based on Gulshan Nanda's novel Sisakate Saaz. In spite of impressive performances by the lead pair and two hit songs, "Mere Naina Sawan Bhadon" and "Parbat Ke Peeche", the film ended up as average hit. This was followed by another moderate fare in Narendra Bedi's action comedy Maha Chor opposite Neetu Singh and a flop in Shammi Kapoor's romantic comedy Bundal Baaz co-starring Sulakshana Pandit. In 1977, Khanna's first release was again a Shakti Samanta directional Anurodh. Its soundtrack composed by Laxmikant–Pyarelal topped the year-end annual list of Binaca Geetmala, but commercially the film was an average runner. His next five releases, included - Din Dayal Sharma's Tyaag, Joy Mukherjee's Chhailla Babu, B.R. Chopra's Karm, Bhappi Sonie's Chalta Purza and Meraj's Palkon Ki Chhaon Mein. While Tyaag and Palkon Ki Chhaon Mein didn't do well, Chhailla Babu, Karm and Chalta Purza were decent box office successes. Before the end of year, he appeared in another of J. Om Prakash's directional Aashiq Hoon Baharon Ka, which was highly anticipated before release, but failed commercially.

=== Career after downfall period (1979–1991) ===
The next year, he had four releases, out of which, Ramanand Sagar's romantic drama film Prem Bandhan, Muqabla, Amardeep, proved to be a moderately successful venture, but Naya Bakra and Janta Hawaldar were commercial failures. In 1979, Khanna appeared alongside Shabana Azmi and Vinod Mehra in the romantic drama Amar Deep. The film opened to positive response from critics and emerged a hit at the box office thus ending his dry run and also proving to be one of the highest-grossing films of that year.

He began the 1980s with Bharathiraja's psychological thriller Red Rose. A remake of blockbuster Tamil film Sigappu Rojakkal, the film couldn't repeat the success of original and flopped commercially. His next release was Esmayeel Shroff's family drama Thodisi Bewafaii opposite Shabana Azmi. It performed well at the box office and proved to be a hit with Khanna receiving his 12th nomination in the Filmfare Award for Best Actor category and Kishore Kumar winning Filmfare Award for Best Male Playback Singer for the song "Hazaar Rahen Mud Ke Dekhin". His other releases of the year were - Anil Ganguly's drama film Aanchal, Danny Denzongpa's horror thriller Phir Wahi Raat and K. Bapaiah's romantic drama Bandish. While Phir Wahi Raat and Bandish were super-hits, Aanchal was a major commercial success. In 1981, he co-starred alongside Raaj Kumar, Vinod Khanna, Hema Malini and Priya Rajvansh in Chetan Anand's reincarnation drama Kudrat. In spite of presence of some of the biggest stars of that time and its soundtrack being one of the best-selling Hindi film albums of the 1980s, Kudrat was proved to be a superhit. Khanna's next release, Dard again with Malini and Dhanwan opposite Reena Roy were hits. His final release of the year, Shomu Mukherjee's Fiffty Fiffty co-starring Tina Munim also performed moderately well. In 1982, Khanna starred in three big budget multi-starrers, Vijay Anand's Rajput, Umesh Mehra's Ashanti, Sultan Ahmed's Dharam Kanta, all three of which emerged box office successes. He also played a brief role in the superhit dance film Disco Dancer. The Disco Dancer soundtrack was popular worldwide, particularly in India, the Soviet Union, and China. It went Platinum in India, equivalent to 1 million sales, and received a Gold Award in China. One of the song from film, "Goron Ki Na Kalon Ki" sung by Suresh Wadkar and filmed on Khanna went on to become a chartbuster.

After almost a decade of sporadic successes, Khanna made a comeback in 1983. His first release Nishaan was a semi-hit, but his second release, Mohan Kumar's Avtaar emerged a hit & was among the highest-grossing films of the year. Khanna received his 14th and final nomination in the Filmfare Award for Best Actor category for Avtaar. His next release was Saawan Kumar Tak's romantic drama Souten co-starring Tina Munim and Padmini Kolhapure. It was the first Hindi film ever to be shot in Mauritius and had a chartbuster soundtrack composed by Usha Khanna with songs "Shayad Meri Shaadi Ka Khayal" and "Zindagi Pyaar Ka Geet Hai" topping the musical charts that year. The film went on to become a superhit and also one of the best-selling Hindi film albums of the 1980s. Khanna completed his hat-trick with another hit in Lekh Tandon's Agar Tum Na Hote. With three back-to-back hits in 1983, he proved that audience still adored him. His good run continued in 1984 with a huge hit in K. Bapaiah's action comedy film Maqsad, which also had Jeetendra, Jaya Prada and Sridevi in the lead, followed by two more successes in Naya Kadam and Dharm Aur Qanoon.

Khanna followed it up with more hit films to his credit namely Insaaf Main Karoonga, Aakhir Kyon?, Durgaa, Masterji, Babu, Zamana, Bewafai in year 1985. He did face failures with Alag Alag, Oonche Log, Awara Baap, Anokha Rishta however bounced back with successful films like Adhikar, Nazrana, Nasihat, Amrit, Shatru, Angaaray, Awam. In 1988 he was part of the successful horror film Woh Phir Aayegi and had another hit venture with Ghar Ka Chiraag, Paap Ka Ant in the following year. In 1990, he starred in David Dhawan's drama film Swarg. An adaptation of Ashok Kumar and Sunil Dutt starrer Mehrban (1967), it went on to become a hit and established Dhawan's career as a director. Swarg also proved to be the last major success of Khanna in the year 1990. In 1991, Khanna had three releases – Begunaah, Rupaye Dus Karod and Ghar Parivar, all of which did well commercially.

=== Sabbatical, work in television and later career (1992–2012) ===
He quit acting for sometime in 1992, to focus on his political career. From 1992 to 1998, he had only two releases - Khudai (1994), which was a film released directly in Zee TV and the much delayed Sautela Bhai (1996), which became an average hit in 1996. In 1999, Khanna appeared in Rishi Kapoor's directional debut Aa Ab Laut Chalen. Despite being hugely hyped before its release, the film received negative reviews from critics and ended up as a below average grosser. He acted in TV serial Ittefaq for Zee TV which was popular in the year 2001.

In the 2000s, he tried to make a comeback with films, such as Pyaar Zindagi Hai (2001), Kyaa Dil Ne Kahaa (2002), Wafa: A Deadly Love Story (2008), but none of them were commercially successful. Khanna's final film appearance was in Ashok Tyagi's much delayed action film Riyasat, which released after his death in 2014. It was panned by critics across the board and was a box office flop.

Khanna appeared in a rare interview in the show Aap Ki Adalat in 1992, where he quoted to the interviewer Rajat Sharma, "I would just ask if I am arrogant, how come all these producers made so many films with me. My fans who turned this actor into a superstar would have never accepted me if I was arrogant. If I was arrogant people would not have made me a Lok Sabha member because if someone is arrogant, that arrogance is visible. And this public knows everything and understand everything".

Khanna was a life member of the International Film And Television Research Centre, the International Film And Television Club and the Asian Academy of Film & Television. He was Faculty Guest of "Specialised Cinema Courses At Asian School Of Media Studies". On 10 April 1999 Khanna inaugurated the live concert of S. P. Balasubrahmanyam, held at Lal Bahadur Shastri Stadium, Hyderabad as a tribute to R. D. Burman. In 2001 and 2002, Khanna played the lead in two television serials: Aapne Parai (B4U and DD Metro) and Ittefaq (Zee TV). He performed in a video album based on Tagore's songs (Rabindra Sangeet) without payment. He also endorsed Star se Superstar tak – a talent hunt programme in 2007 and donated a Gold Trophy of Rs.1 crore. In its Silver Jubilee Episode on 14–15 March 2008, K for Kishore aired a Rajesh Khanna special. He signed on to star in a TV serial with Creative Eye Banner, (Dhiraj Kumar) in 2007, and in 2008 performed in a TV serial, Bhabhima, with Leena Ganguly as his co-star. His successful TV serial Raghukul Reet Sada Chali Aayi began in November 2008 and ended in September 2009. Khanna cited the lack of good roles for actors like him in films as the reason for him not appearing much in films after 2001. He said in an interview on being queried about his decision to do TV serials: "The reach of TV is much more than cinema today and one episode of my serial is likely to be watched by more people than a super-hit film". In May 2012, Havells, the fan making company endorsed Khanna as Brand Ambassador for their new ad campaign featuring him in solo advertisements.

=== Inspirations and influence ===
Khanna considered Guru Dutt, Meena Kumari and Geeta Bali to be his idols. Khanna said in an interview: "My inspirations include Dilip Kumar's dedication and intensity, Raj Kapoor's spontaneity, Dev Anand's style and Shammi Kapoor's rhythm." In an interview given to The Hindu in 2011, Khanna specially mentioned Uttam Kumar, the greatest actor of Bengali cinema, as his idol. In that interview, Khanna also claimed that Uttam Kumar was the greatest living actor of his time.

== Political and business career ==
At the insistence of Rajiv Gandhi, Khanna started campaigning for Indian National Congress after 1984. In the election for New Delhi seat in the 1991 Lok Sabha election, Khanna lost to L. K. Advani by a narrow margin of 1589 votes, after which Khanna stood on the grounds at the counting station insisting that he had been cheated of a win. In 1992, a by-election was called after the resignation of the incumbent Member of Parliament L. K. Advani. Khanna contested the seat again, won the by-election by defeating Shatrughan Sinha by 25,000 votes. Khanna was a member of Parliament for the Indian National Congress, from the New Delhi constituency, where he won the 1992 by-election, retaining his seat until 1996 after which he was not interested in active politics. When Khanna was MP, he did not accept new acting assignments, but only acted in the film Khudai (1994). After leaving parliament, he was a political activist for the INC and campaigned for the party till the 2012 Punjab election.

Khanna and a group of foreign investors bought land in Shirdi, on which he built a religious resort for disciples of Sai Baba.

== Personal life ==
In the late 1960s and early 1970s, Khanna fell in love with the then fashion designer and actress Anju Mahendru. They were in a relationship for seven years before breaking up. Mahendru states that the couple did not speak to each other for 17 years after the break-up.

Later Khanna – 30 at that time – married the budding actress Dimple Kapadia who was then 15 years old, in March 1973, before Kapadia's debut film Bobby released in September that year. Khanna and Kapadia have two daughters from the marriage; Twinkle and Rinke. The couple separated in 1982, but never divorced. Their relationship later became more amicable and they both were seen together at functions. Kapadia also campaigned for Khanna's election and worked in his film Jai Shiv Shankar (1990), although the film never got released.

In the 1980s, Tina Munim fell in love with Khanna. She had been a fan of Khanna since her school days. They appeared in ten films together between 1981 and 1986. According to website Bollywood Mantra, Khanna refused the marriage proposal of Tina, as he was sure that Dimple would come back in his life and he did not want to marry her as their marriage would have a bad impact on his daughters.

Rajesh Khanna was in a long-term, live-in relationship with former actress Anita Advani during his later years, residing with her at his bungalow, 'Aashirwad'. Advani claimed she was his "surrogate wife" and lived with him for over a decade until his death in 2012, even as he remained legally married to Dimple Kapadia.

Khanna's elder daughter Twinkle Khanna, an interior decorator and a former film actress, is married to actor Akshay Kumar, while his younger daughter Rinke Khanna, also a former Hindi film actress, is married to London-based investment banker Samir Saran.

== Artistry and legacy ==
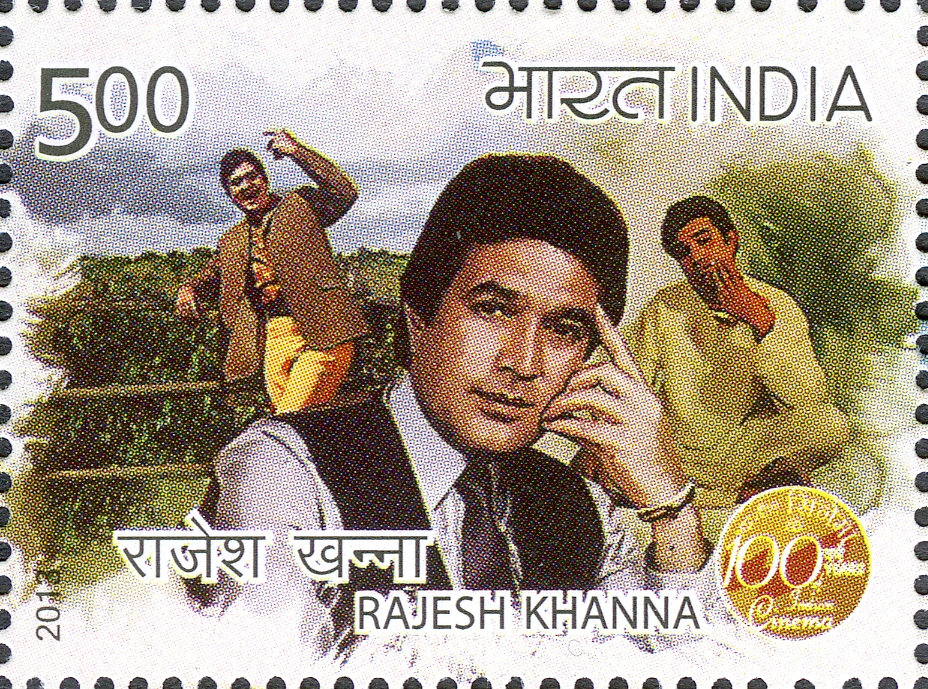
Khanna on a 2013 stamp of India

Khanna is regarded as one of the greatest actors of Indian cinema. Khanna is noted for his acting, style, musicals and dance. One of the most successful and highest-paid actors of 1970s and 1980s, Khanna appeared in Box Office India's "Top Actors" list six times from 1969 to 1974. He topped the list three times (1969–1971). In 2022, he was placed in Outlook India's "75 Best Bollywood Actors" list. Khanna was placed ninth among the "Greatest Bollywood Stars" in a UK poll celebrating 100 years of Indian cinema in 2013. Khanna has the record for the most films as the solo lead hero in Hindi films – 106. Rediff.com placed him 8th in its "Top 10 Bollywood Actors of All Time" list. Khanna was named as one of "the men who changed the face of the Indian Cinema" by CNN-News18. In 1973, BBC made a documentary on him, named Bombay Superstar as a part of the series, Man Alive. A textbook prescribed by the Mumbai University contained an essay, "The Charisma of Rajesh Khanna!"

Khanna acted alongside Mumtaz in ten films. She stated "I would pull his leg and tease him about his fan following. Whenever Rajesh entered a hotel in Madras, there was a queue of 600 girls waiting to see him at midnight. As a result, even I would get some importance, as people would ask for my autograph as well. He was very generous with his associates." During the peak of his career, he would be mobbed during public appearances. Fans kissed his car, which would be covered with lipstick marks, and lined the road, cheering and chanting his name. Female fans sent him letters written in their blood. Actor Mehmood parodied him in Bombay to Goa where the driver and conductor of the bus were called 'Rajesh' and 'Khanna' respectively. A scene of Amar Prem, to be shot at Howrah Bridge, was cancelled due to his popularity. Film critic Monojit Lahiri said: "Girls married themselves to photographs of Khanna, cutting their fingers and applying the blood as sindoor. He was God, there has never been such hysteria."

Several songs sung by Kishore Kumar in the 1970s were based on Khanna. In the 1970s, his chemistry with Sharmila Tagore, Mumtaz, Asha Parekh, Zeenat Aman, Tanuja and Hema Malini were popular with the audience. Sharmila Tagore, with whom he made the best onscreen pairing, said in an interview to The Indian Express that "women came out in droves to see Kaka. They would stand in queues outside the studios to catch a glimpse. He needed police protection when he was in public. I have never seen anything like this before or since." Music remained one of the biggest attractions of his career. Khanna used to personally sit in music sessions with music directors and used to be personally present for recording of songs picturised on him. Khanna's on-screen pairings with Shabana Azmi, Smita Patil, Tina Munim, Padmini Kolhapure and Poonam Dhillon was also popular in the 80s. The trio of Rajesh Khanna, Kishore Kumar and R.D. Burman went on to make a number of popular films, including Kati Patang, Amar Prem, Shehzada, Apna Desh, Mere Jeevan Saathi, Namak Haraam, Aap Ki Kasam, Ajnabee, Maha Chor, Karm, Phir Wohi Raat, Aanchal, Kudrat, Ashanti, Agar Tum Na Hote, Awaaz, Hum Dono and Alag Alag.

Kamal Haasan was a close friend of Khanna. Kamal in an interview, narrated his experience of Khanna's stardom, in an incident in 1985 – "He probably hadn't been to a public theatre since he became a star. When we reached, things were okay. He enjoyed the film (The Swarm) and refused to leave until the end titles. That's when I panicked. This was Rajesh Khanna, the star of the millennium. All hell broke loose as audiences realised he was there, his shirt was torn, but he was enjoying himself thoroughly. He giggled and chuckled like a child." Shah Rukh Khan idolised Khanna and has opined; "Rajesh Khanna, you can't touch". Anupam Kher said "Kishore Kumar, Sanjeev Kumar, S. D. Burman, R. D. Burman, Rajesh Khanna and Smita Patil changed the face of Indian cinema. They're remembered by the films that they did." Actor Tom Alter confessed "I still dream of being Rajesh Khanna. For me, in the early 1970s, he was the only hero – romantic to the core, not larger than life, so Indian and real – he was my hero; the reason I came into films and he still is." Actor Irrfan Khan stated in an interview, "The kind of craze witnessed by Rajesh Khanna has not been duplicated by anyone. He was the biggest and the most real star Bollywood has produced. I'd say stardom is that feeling of being possessed by your idol; you are so overwhelmed with euphoria you lose touch with reality." The trend of wearing guru kurtas and belts on shirts became famous because of Khanna. Actor Salman Khan has stated: "I, Shahrukh or Aamir have not even achieved 10% of what Khanna had in acting or his stardom."

== Illness and death ==
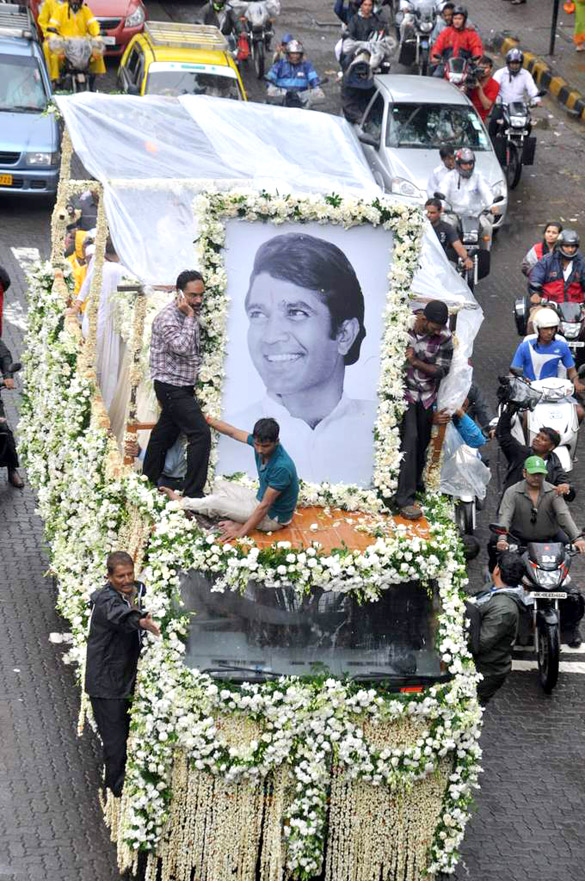
Khanna's funeral procession in Mumbai on 19 July 2012

In May 2012, Rajesh Khanna, though weak with illness since April, shot for a commercial, for Havells ceiling fans, by film director R. Balki. In June 2012, it was reported that Khanna's health had been deteriorating for some time. On 23 June he was admitted to Lilavati Hospital in Mumbai due to health complications. He was discharged on 8 July from the hospital and was reportedly fine.

On 14 July, Khanna was readmitted to the Lilavati Hospital, but was discharged on 16 July. He died on 18 July 2012, at his bungalow, Aashirwad, in Mumbai. Sources confirmed that his health had been deteriorating since July 2011 as he was diagnosed with cancer. After his death his co-star Mumtaz said that he was suffering from cancer for the duration of the prior year and had undergone chemotherapy sessions. His funeral took place on 19 July at 11:00. His funeral ceremony was attended by 9 lakh (900,000) people and his fans came from places like Surat, Ahmedabad, Vadodara, Pune, Bangalore and other countries. Police had to resort to a lathi-charge to control the crowd of fans who had gathered for the procession from his Bandra house to the crematorium. He died in the presence of his wife Dimple Kapadia, daughters Rinke Khanna and Twinkle Khanna, son-in-law Akshay Kumar, grandchildren, Anju Mahendru and other close relatives. His pyre was lit by his grandson, Aarav, with the assistance of Akshay Kumar.

Amitabh Bachchan cited that Rajesh Khanna's last words were "Time is up, Pack up". In a pre-recorded message to his family, friends and fans that was played on his "chautha", he thanked and saluted his friends and fans for the love they showered on him and also shared how he became a successful actor without having any godfather behind him. On 25 July 2012, his ashes were immersed in the Ganges at Rishikesh, Uttarakhand by his wife Dimple Kapadia and daughter Rinke Khanna.

== Honors and tributes ==
The President of India, Pratibha Patil, lamented the death of the actor. In a press release she said "I am saddened to learn about the passing away of Rajesh Khanna. In his prime as an actor he was the heartthrob of the young generation of 1970s, who tried to model themselves on him and his style." Prime Minister Dr. Manmohan Singh and Narendra Modi who used to be Chief Minister of Gujarat mourned his death. Many celebrities including Amitabh Bachchan, Shah Rukh Khan, Aamir Khan, Karan Johar, Shabana Azmi, Rishi Kapoor and many politicians also paid homage to him after his death. Other celebrities who paid homage to him at his house after his death included Manoj Kumar, Asha Parekh, Ranjeet, Jeetendra, Rakesh Roshan, Yash Chopra, Randhir Kapoor, Rishi Kapoor, Shabana Azmi, Dharmendra, Vinod Khanna, Asrani, Prem Chopra, Govinda, Salman Khan, Shah Rukh Khan, Aamir Khan, Amitabh Bachchan, Hema Malini, Himesh Reshammiya, Ram Kapoor, Mahesh Thakur, Aadesh Shrivastava and Sajid Khan. His prayer meeting, organised in a grand way at the Taj Land's End hotel in Bandra, Mumbai on 21 July 2012, was attended by many, including Reena Roy, Padmini Kolhapure, Neelam, Jaya Prada, Amar Singh, Bindu, Poonam Dhillon, Neetu Kapoor, Jaya Bachchan, Aamir Khan, Kiran Rao, Ranbir Kapoor, Mithun Chakraborthy, Shakti Kapoor, Shashi Kapoor, Suresh Oberoi, Parmeshwar Godrej, Tabu, Sonali Bendre and Jackie Shroff.

Shah Rukh Khan reacted by saying: "To live with intention and walk to the edge. Play with abandon, choose with no regret. Smile and made us do the same. Sir, you defined our era. Whenever life felt tough you made us feel how love could change it all. RIP ". Mumtaz also added that she had memories of having worked with him and said that she had been crying the whole morning, but was happy that she had met the ailing Rajesh Khanna in Mumbai in June 2012, when the two discussed their respective battles with cancer. While Shahid Kapoor quoted: "RIP to the First King of Romance ... Rajesh Khanna." Subhash Ghai added that Khanna " was the powerhouse of the Hindi film industry. I met him on the set of Aradhana, he had some kind of energy and you will be charged when he is around you. His name will be written in golden words." Amitabh Bachchan was quoted as saying: "The word 'Superstar' was invented for him, and for me it shall ever remain his, and no others .. !! His generation and the generations that follow, shall never be able to describe, or understand his phenomena .. !!". His son-in-law Akshay Kumar said, "you are a father, a Legend & a very treasured man, who will never be forgotten."

Vyjayanthimala commented that "His death is a big loss to the industry. It's my bad luck that I didn't have the chance to work with him because he came much later. I remember when he came to Chennai for some film shoot, the college girls went crazy to catch a glimpse of him when he was going to his studio." Manna Dey said: "He was a great actor, truly a superstar, no doubt about it. I am honoured to have done playback for him. I have worked for him in several movies, and actors like him are a rarity." Mrinal Sen recollected how Khanna had wanted to cast him in one of his films, but the latter could not manage due to date problems. "We had met several times. Once I had wanted to cast him in one of my films, but somehow that didn't work out due to his date problems."

Film historian S. M. M. Ausaja added: "He never acted in a Bengali cinema. But right from the late 1960s to the 70s he was the top star and worked with the top directors of his era, most of whom were Bengalis." There were also reactions from the Gali Tiwaria where his ancestral house was, and had since been converted to a temple through his donation. Songs from his movies were played as the news of his death became known. His foster brother Muni Chand Khanna said that "he used to love to play Cricket when he lived here. He was a simple boy when he lived here and led a simple life even after achieving so much." As were the residents of Burewala, Pakistan.

Buddhadeb Dasgupta said Khanna's acting would continue to inspire young actors in the future. "He was a great actor and was the first superstar. He was a much bigger star than Amitabh Bachchan. His acting will continue to inspire young actors of the coming generations." Rituparno Ghosh said: "In the film 'Anand', he delivered some of Indian cinema's most memorable dialogues. The use of the word 'Babu Moshai' by Rajesh Khanna to Amitabh Bachchan, who played a Bengali doctor in the film, is so deeply etched in the minds of Indians that it has almost become a synonym for Bengalis for the rest of the countrymen. "In a dhoti and kurta, you showed the rest of India how truly elegant Bengal was" Madhur Bhandarkar said, "The epitome of superstardom is no more amongst us. There was none, there is none and there won't be any like you, Kakaji."

Additionally, those within the political spectrum that offered their condolences included Prime Minister Manmohan Singh, who said that he "convey[s] my heartfelt condolences to the members of the bereaved family and countless fans and admirers of Shri Rajesh Khanna." INC President Sonia Gandhi also expressed her sorrow. Regional political leaders who offered their condolences included Chief Minister of West Bengal Mamata Banerjee, who said: "Rajesh Khanna was always a symbol of romance. His smiling face and the ability to connect with people at ease had made him popular. We lost a big pole star in the film world today." As well as Bihar Chief Minister Nitish Kumar who added that "his death has caused irreparable loss to Hindi cinema."

Condolences also came from Pakistan where Prime Minister Raja Pervaiz Ashraf called Khanna a "great actor whose contribution to the field of films and arts would be long remembered. [He had a] large fan following across the borders and captivated audiences with his excellent acting skills." Ali Zafar wrote on Twitter: "Rajesh Khanna – RIP. So many fond memories from his movies and songs.", while Syed Noor said: "Rajesh Khanna was such a huge actor of the subcontinent that he will be remembered by the people for many years to come. The era he reigned over is unlikely to be experienced by any other actor of this subcontinent." Geo TV also aired a nearly hour-long tribute with contributions from actors, filmmakers and musicians.

A postage stamp featuring Khanna was released by the India Post on 3 May 2013. On his first death anniversary, a bronze statue of Khanna was unveiled at Bollywood Walk of Fame at Bandra Bandstand, Mumbai. A chowk (intersection) in Girgaon has been named "Superstar Rajesh Khanna Chowk" in his memory. In 2014, his biography Rajesh Khanna: The Untold Story of India's First Superstar by Yasser Usman was published by Penguin Books. In 2022, his biography Rajesh Khanna The Most Versatile Superstar Actor of Hindi Cinema by Narayanan Subramanian was released. In 2018, a one kilometre fitness trail in Lajpat Nagar National Park was named after Khanna, which was inaugurated by his wife Dimple Kapadia.

== Accolades ==
Khanna won seven All-India Critics Association (AICA) Best Actor Awards, and received 10 nominations. He won four Best Actor Awards in the Bengal Film Journalists' Association Awards, and received 25 nominations. He won three Filmfare Best Actor Awards, one Filmfare Special Guest Actor Award in 1973, and received a Filmfare Special Award in 1991, after 25 years in the Hindi film industry. He received the Filmfare Lifetime Achievement Award at the 50th anniversary Filmfare Awards ceremony in 2005. He also received the IIFA Lifetime Achievement Award in 2009.
