= N. C. Sippy =

Indian film producer

- Born: 22 August 1926; Karachi, Bombay Presidency, British India (now in Pakistan)
- Died: 25 November 2001 (aged 75); Mumbai, Maharashtra, India
- Occupations: Film producer, director
- Children: Raj N. Sippy; Romu N. Sippy; Mohini N. Sippy
- Awards: Filmfare Award

N. C. Sippy (22 August 1926 – 25 November 2001) was an Indian film producer and director who originally worked as a production manager, executive producer and presenter during his initial career span. He later worked as a producer and Bollywood film director in several Hindi films in the cinema of India. Sippy is known for his prominent films such as Gol Maal, Satte Pe Satta, Chupke Chupke, Anand, Khubsoorat, Guddi, Aashirwad, Padosan and other Hindi-language movies most of which were directed by Hrishikesh Mukherji.

== Early life ==
N. C. Sippy was born in Karachi, British India and later in 1946, he moved to Bombay (now Mumbai) where an Indian comedian-actor named Gope helped him in his career development. N.C, with the help of Gope, worked as a production manager. His first production film was Talaq (1958) which was directed by Mahesh Kaul.

== Career ==
Sippy's first production Talaq (1958) was the last one as he later decided to work as a producer in films like Bin Badal Barsaat (1963), Aashirwad (1968), and more. In 1971, Sippy and Hrishikesh Mukherji started working together in a film titled Anand. Since then, their work had produced films such as Guddi (1971), Bawarchi (1972), Chupke Chupke (1975), Mili (1975), Gol Maal (1979), and Khubsoorat (1980).

In 1998, when his wife died, he lost his voice and started communicating with his family and friends by writing notes. He died on 25 November 2001, in a private hospital in Mumbai.

== Filmography ==
- Khubsoorat (1980)
- Gol Maal (1979)
- Alaap (1977)
- Mili (1975)
- Chupke Chupke (1975)
- Bawarchi (1972)
- Mere Apne (1971)
- Bombay to Goa (1972)
- Anand (1971)
- Guddi (1971)
- Aashirwad (1968)
- Sadhu Aur Shaitaan (1968)
- Padosan (1968)
- Diwana (1967)
- Bin Badal Barsaat (1963)
- Sawan (1959)
- Aas (1953)

== Awards ==
- Filmfare Award (1972) - Best Film - Anand (1971)
- Filmfare Award (1981) - Best Film - Khubsoorat (1980)
- National Film Award - Best Feature Film in Hindi - Aashirwad (1968)
