= Mili (1975 film) =

- Directed by: Hrishikesh Mukherjee
- Written by: Bimal Dutta; Rahi Masoom Reza; Mohini N. Sippy
- Produced by: Hrishikesh Mukherjee; N. C. Sippy
- Starring: Amitabh Bachchan; Jaya Bachchan; Ashok Kumar; Asrani; Aruna Irani; Suresh Chatwal
- Cinematography: Jaywant Pathare
- Edited by: Hrishikesh Mukherjee
- Music by: Sachin Dev Burman
- Production company: Mohan Studios
- Release date: 20 June 1975
- Running time: 124 minutes
- Country: India
- Language: Hindi

Mili is a 1975 Indian Hindi-language romantic drama film directed by Hrishikesh Mukherjee. It stars Amitabh Bachchan, Jaya Bachchan and Ashok Kumar. Jaya Bachchan received a Filmfare nomination as Best Actress, the only nomination for the film. The film was remade in Telugu in 1976 as Jyothi starring Jayasudha in the title role. Mili was the final work of music composer S.D. Burman, who died four months after the film's release.

== Plot ==
Mili is a girl who has pernicious anemia, a disorder considered untreatable at the time. Her lively, inquisitive and cheerful demeanour spread happiness in everyone's life. She becomes an inspiration to her new neighbour Shekhar who is a depressed alcoholic. With her cheerful ways she changes Shekhar and he falls in love with her, unaware of her ailment. When he learns of it, he thinks of going away as he cannot bear to see her die. A reproach from their neighbour Runa makes him reconsider his decision. He offers to marry her and take her abroad for her treatment. The film begins and ends with a scene of an aircraft taking off, ostensibly carrying the couple to Switzerland where they hope to find a cure for Mili's illness.

== Cast ==
- Amitabh Bachchan as Shekhar Dayal
- Jaya Bhaduri as Mili Khanna
- Ashok Kumar as Mr. Khanna, Mili's father
- Usha Kiran as Sharda Khanna
- Suresh Chatwal as Ranjeet Khanna
- Shubha Khote as Neighbour
- Aruna Irani as Runa Singh
- Navneet Nishan as Mili Young

== Soundtrack ==
Mili

Soundtrack album by S. D. Burman
- Released: June 20, 1975
- Genre: Feature film soundtrack
- Length: 17:17
- Language: Hindi
- Label: Saregama
- Producer: S. D. Burman

S. D. Burman chronology
Chupke Chupke (1975)	Mili (1975)	Mili (1975)

All lyrics are written by Yogesh.; all music is composed by S.D. Burman

Songs
No.	Title	Singer(s)	Length
1.	"Aaye Tum Yaad Mujhe"	Kishore Kumar	04:41
2.	"Badi Sooni Sooni Hai"	Kishore Kumar	03:29
3.	"Maine Kaha Phoolon Se"	Lata Mangeshkar	05:03
4.	"Badi Sooni Soni Hai (Revival)"	Kishore Kumar	03:40
5.	"Badi Sooni Hai Zindagi (With Dialogues)"	Kishore Kumar, Amitabh Bachchan	04:04

== Awards ==
Year	Nominee / work	Award	Result
1976	Amitabh Bachchan	BFJA Awards for Best Actor (Hindi)	Won
1976	Jaya Bachchan	Filmfare Award for Best Actress	Nominated
