= Maalik (1972 film) =

- Directed by: A. Bhimsingh
- Starring: Sharmila Tagore; Rajesh Khanna
- Music by: Kalyanji-Anandji
- Release date: 27 October 1972
- Country: India
- Language: Hindi

Maalik is a 1972 Indian Hindi-language spiritual drama film directed by A. Bhimsingh. The film stars Sharmila Tagore and Rajesh Khanna. Ashok Kumar played a special appearance. It is a loose remake of Tamil film Thunaivan. It was the second box office flop in the career of Rajesh Khanna since the beginning of his 17 consecutive hits from 1969 to 1971. The film was critically acclaimed. There were other films of Khanna which were running well at the box office, such as Mere Jeevan Saathi, Apna Desh, Amar Prem and Shehzada in the same year, due to which this spiritual film was not screened by in many theatres by distributors, due to which producers suffered losses.

Badnam Farishte in 1971 was the first film of Khanna to flop at the box office since his consecutive 17 hits from 1969. Before the release of Maalik, Khanna had 9 more hits in the year 1972. In 1972, Khanna acted in 10 releases of which 9 became successful. He did a guest appearance in a Telugu movie called Bangaru Babu, directed by V.B. Rajendra Prasad in 1973. His Hindi films Dushman, Amar Prem, Apna Desh and Mere Jeevan Saathi, together earned more than Rs.5 crore. His other films of 1972 such as Dil Daulat Duniya, Bawarchi, Joroo Ka Ghulam and Shehzada earned more than Rs.4.5 crores. His last hit in year 1972 was Anuraag.

== Plot ==
A lady who is very poor and about to die places her baby before the entrance of the Krishna temple. Pandeyji, the head priest, observes the kid and decides to let the kid grow up in the vicinity of the temple premises. The kid grows up to be a huge an innocent devotee of Krishna, addressed by villagers as Raju. On a day, when Dharmadeva comes to take a darshan (viewing) of the lord, he observes that gold chain gifted by him to temple is missing. Dharmadeva orders his men to beat up Raju as he becomes suspects Raju to be thief. Pandeyji then requests Dharmadeva to not trouble Raju anymore as Raju cannot be a thief. Dhamradeva declares that Raju should not be seen in the village from the next day. Pandeyji gives him the contact of Ram Murthy Pandey, who resides in Mumbai and asks Raju to stay there and start working. Raju then wanders around and happens to visit a satsang held by Ganesh Duttji. There, Raju loudly proclaims that there is no God and the God does not protect the innocent poor even if justice lies on their side. Ganesh Duttji then advises Raju to keep having faith in Krishna and do work properly. Raju, after meeting Ram Murthy, decides to start selling vegetables to people and regains his faith in Lord Krishna. However, people make fun of his good looks and steal fruits and vegetables. One day, he comes across a person who has come with 4 lakhs rupees in a suitcase and has attacks of "Fits". Raju gives that person an iron rod, by which the attack subsides. Recognising the honesty of Raju, that man gifts 10,000 rupees. Raju decides to starts selling paintings of various gods, then starts Krishna jewelry. He suddenly becomes a rich man. He now starts to be known as a very generous and kind businessman. One day, he bumps into Dharmadeva, who apologizes for his mistake, as the gold chain was found inside the temple below the statue of Krishna. Raju forgives Dharmadeva by saying "I became a rich man, only because you drove the poor Raju away. Had bad times not befallen, this good time would not have come." Dharmadeva, then, observes that his daughter has developed a liking for the personality of Raju and decides to get them married. Savitri considers Raju as her lord and respects him a lot. However Savitri, having been educated till college, always questions traditions and culture and believes in Darwin's theory and atheism. Savitri does not like Raju thanking god for every con-incidence or good thing happening in his life. This leads to a huge fight between Savitri and Raju. The couple decide to part ways, but reconcile. However, a paralytic child is born to them. Raju then says such a kid was born only because God wanted to teach Savitri a lesson. Savitri accepts her mistake and then starts going on Tirthyatra with Raju to all the temples. Savitri experiences God in daily life instances. What will happen to their child forms the last part of the film.

== Cast ==
- Sharmila Tagore ... Savitri
- Rajesh Khanna ... Raju
- Ashok Kumar ... Ganesh Duttji "Guru"
- Deven Verma ... Ram Murthy Pandey (as Devan Varma)
- Sonia Sahni ... Narangi
- Bipin Gupta ... Dharamdevta
- Shivraj ... Pandeyji
- Baby Pinky ... Lord Krishna

== Soundtrack ==
#	Title	Singer(s)
1	"Khana Milega Pina Milega"	Kishore Kumar
2	"Aa Man Se Man Ki Dor"	Mahendra Kapoor, Lata Mangeshkar
3	"Aarti Utaro Radheshyam Ki"	Mahendra Kapoor, Lata Mangeshkar
4	"Duniya Ki Har Maa Apne Bete Ko"	Lata Mangeshkar
5	"Kanhaiya Tujhe Aana Padega"	Mahendra Kapoor, Lata Mangeshkar
6	"O Malik Mere Aaye Hai Sahare Tere"	Mahendra Kapoor, Lata Mangeshkar
7	"Radhe Krishna Bol Mukh Se"	Mahendra Kapoor
8	"Kanhaiya Tujhe Aana Padega"	Mahendra Kapoor
