= Palkon Ki Chhaon Mein =

- Theatrical release poster
- Directed by: Meraj
- Written by: Gulzar
- Produced by: Nariman Baria; A. Khalia
- Starring: Rajesh Khanna; Hema Malini; Jeetendra
- Cinematography: Yusuf Kondaji
- Edited by: Waman B. Bhosle; Gurudutt Shirali
- Music by: Laxmikant Pyarelal
- Production company: Nav Sampathi Productions
- Release date: 11 November 1977
- Running time: 155 minutes
- Country: India
- Language: Hindi
- Box office: 10 million

Palkon Ki Chhaon Mein (transl. In the shade of the eyelashes) is a 1977 Indian Hindi-language drama film, produced by Nariman Baria and A. Khalia under the Nav Sampathi Productions banner and directed by Meraj. The film stars Rajesh Khanna, Hema Malini while Jeetendra has given a special appearance and music composed by Laxmikant Pyarelal. It received 4 of 5 stars from critics in Bollywood Guide Collections. The film was critically acclaimed and became an unexpected flop at the box office. However over the years, the film has been appreciated by the audiences in its screening on television and has gained a cult following over the years. Welcome to Sajjanpur, a film inspired by Palkon Ki Chhaon Mein, became a hit at the box office in 2008.

== Plot ==
Ravi Raj Sinha is a well-educated but unemployed man whose mother, Pratima Devi, wants him to find work. One day, while collecting his father's pension at the post office, Ravi is mistaken for a job candidate. After a cheerful conversation, the postmaster offers him a postman's job, which he gladly accepts. Ravi is sent to the village of Sitapur, where he notices Mohini constantly waiting for a letter. The two become friends, and Ravi falls in love with her. Nathu, a tanga driver, takes a keen interest in their relationship.

When Mohini asks Ravi for his measurements so she can knit him a sweater, he mistakenly assumes she loves him. Later, after Mohini complains that he never brings her a letter, Ravi writes one proposing marriage. Mohini reveals that she has been waiting for a letter from her husband. Heartbroken, Ravi learns in flashback that Mohini loves a soldier, also named Ravi, who promised to return from the war but never did. Ravi gives her the letter and tries unsuccessfully to find the soldier.

Returning home, Ravi's mother warns him never to lie to anyone in the village. Soon afterwards, an elderly woman asks Ravi to read a letter announcing her son's death. Remembering his mother's advice, Ravi tells her the truth. The woman dies from the shock. That same day, Ravi receives a telegram confirming that Mohini's soldier lover has also died. Unable to tell Mohini, he leaves silently.

Mohini later asks why Ravi visited her, and he finally reveals the truth. The next morning, she attempts suicide. Concerned for her, her mother asks Ravi to accompany them to Khetpur, where Mohini is to be married. During the journey, Ravi admits that he loves Mohini and therefore could not bring himself to tell her that her lover had died. Mohini is deeply upset.

Ravi accompanies them to Khetpur and prepares to leave, but Mohini is struck on the stairs and falls. As Ravi rushes to help her, his mother appears. They stare at one another in astonishment before she reveals that she has come to arrange Ravi's marriage to Mohini. Ravi and Mohini are overjoyed, and the film ends.

== Cast ==
- Rajesh Khanna as Ravi Raj Sinha (Dakiya Babu)
- Hema Malini as Mohini
- Jeetendra as Ravi (Soldier)
- Rekha as Dancer (Guest Appearance)
- Amjad Khan as Nathu
- Asrani as Raghu
- Farida Jalal as Chutki
- Kanhaiyalal
- Leela Mishra as Mohini's mother
- Master Rajoo as Parcel
- Pratima Devi as Ravi's mother
- Dhumal
- Shahid Bijnori
- Sharma
- Sunder
- Leela Chitnis

== Soundtrack ==
#	Title	Singer(s)
1	"Daakiya Daak Laya"	Kishore Kumar
2	"Ladkhadaane Do Mujhe"	Kishore Kumar
3	"Allah Megh De"	Kishore Kumar, Asha Bhosle
4	"Surmewaale Saiyan"	Suman Kalyanpur
5	"Koi Mere Maathe Ki"	Lata Mangeshkar
