= Sachaa Jhutha =

1970 Indian film by Manmohan Desai

- Movie Poster
- Directed by: Manmohan Desai
- Written by: Jeevanprabha M. Desai; Prayag Raj
- Produced by: Vinod Doshi
- Starring: Rajesh Khanna; Mumtaz; Vinod Khanna
- Cinematography: Peter Pereira
- Edited by: Kamlakar Karkhanis
- Music by: Kalyanji-Anandji
- Production company: Ranjit Studios
- Distributed by: Shemaroo Video Pvt. Ltd
- Release date: 1 May 1970
- Running time: 144 minutes
- Country: India
- Language: Hindi
- Box office: ₹5.50 crore (equivalent to ₹271 crore or US$28 million in 2023)

Sachaa Jhutha (English: "Honest and Liar") is a 1970 Indian Hindi action comedy film directed by Manmohan Desai and produced by Vinod Doshi. The film stars Rajesh Khanna in dual roles, alongside Mumtaz and Vinod Khanna in lead roles. It revolves around a simple villager with a lookalike — a crook who takes advantage of the former's simplicity and mirror-image.

The story was written by Desai's wife Jeevanprabha. The music of the film is composed by Kalyanji-Anandji and is edited by Kamlakar Kamkhanis.

The film was the second highest grosser of the year and was declared a super hit. The performance of Rajesh Khanna was critically acclaimed and he won the Filmfare Best Actor Award for 1971. Being a box office blockbuster, it is counted among the 17 consecutive hit films of Rajesh Khanna between 1969 and 1971, by adding the two-hero films Marayada and Andaz to the 15 consecutive solo hits he gave from 1969 to 1971.

== Plot ==
Bhola is an innocent band musician who lives with his physically challenged sister Belu in a village. He needs more money for his sister's marriage and sets off to Bombay to earn. To make his sister not feel sad about his departure, he sings a song on the way towards the railway station. On the other hand, the Bombay City Police Department is shocked by a series of diamond thefts which leave no clue. But Inspector Pradhan suspects the thief to be Ranjeet Kumar, who is actually a wealthy diamond businessman, on the account that whenever a theft occurs, he is present there. But he has no evidence and searches for some. He creates a plan with Leena to attract Ranjeet and to know his secret plans. Bhola arrives in the city and he is called Ranjeet at a party. Ranjeet, who arrives at the party later, is surprised to see Bhola, as he looks identical to him. He immediately conceives a plan. He takes Bhola to his place and reveals himself. He convinces Bhola to act like Ranjeet in front of society as he is suffering from cancer and requires treatment. Until his return from treatment, Bhola has to make everybody believe that he is Ranjeet. Actually, Ranjeet does so to continue with his diamond smuggling, meanwhile, there will not be any evidence, as Bhola is going to be with Ranjeet everywhere. But he did not reveal the reason to him. He also promises that he would give money for his sister's marriage. Innocent Bhola believes him and agrees to the plan.

Ranjeet's girlfriend Ruby trains Bhola to be like Ranjeet and he acts like him. Bhola finally learns every mannerism of Ranjeet and at an instance, he behaves like Ranjeet to Ranjeet. He acts as Ranjeet in the city and the real Ranjeet continues his underground work of diamond smuggling and Inspector Pradhan cannot come to a conclusion. Leena moves intimately with Bhola thinking of him as Ranjeet, but Bhola falls in love with her. On the other side, in the village, due to heavy floods, Belu loses everything and comes in search of her brother to Bombay with her dog Moti. Bhola watches a marriage ceremony on the road and he imagines the bride to be his sister and sings the same song which he sang in the village. Belu, who hears that, runs after him, but Bhola has already left the place. Pradhan meets Belu and helps her reach the place. Some men mislead Belu regarding her brother's whereabouts and try to exploit her, but Pradhan saves her and takes her to his home. Ruby, who follows Belu to Pradhan's house informs Ranjeet about her. Ranjeet, posing like her brother, goes to Pradhan's home and takes her with him.

Bhola finds out Ranjeet is actually a thief and plans a grand diamond loot. Bhola resists the plan, but Ranjeet blackmails him with his sister. Unwillingly, he accepts the plan. Ranjeet steals a huge amount of diamonds, but Bhola replaces him by attacking him and leaves the place. One of the stolen diamond pieces has a transmitter and police follow the jewels with its help. Belu is confused as to who is her brother among them. After several fights, both Bhola and Ranjeet are arrested. Both of them claim themselves as Bhola and confuse everyone. Belu suggests that her brother play the song on a musical instrument which cannot be played by anyone else, but both play the same tune. Finally, Bhola and Belu's dog Moti identifies the real Bhola and Ranjeet is arrested and sent to prison. Belu finally marries Inspector Pradhan and Bhola marries Leena.

== Cast ==
- Rajesh Khanna as Bhola / Ranjeet Kumar (double role)
- Mumtaz as CID Inspector Leena / Rita
- Vinod Khanna as CID Inspector Pradhan
- Naaz as Belu
- Faryal as Ruby
- Jagdish Raj as CID Inspector Jagdish
- Kamal Kapoor as Police Commissioner
- Dina Pathak as Pradhan's Mother
- Moti as Dog

== Soundtrack ==
The music is composed by Kalyanji-Anandji, with lyrics by Indivar, Gulshan Bawra and Qamar Jalalabadi.

Song	Singer
"Meri Pyari Bahaniya"-1	Kishore Kumar
"Meri Pyari Bahaniya"-2	Kishore Kumar
"Dil Sachaa Aur Chehra Jhutha"	Kishore Kumar
"O Kehdo Kehdo Haan Tum Jo Kehdo"	Lata Mangeshkar, Kishore Kumar
"Yun Hi Tum Mujhse Baat Karti Ho, Ya Koi Pyar Ka Iraada Hai"	Lata Mangeshkar, Mohammed Rafi
"Karle Pyar Karle"	Asha Bhosle

== Awards ==
- 1970 Filmfare Best Actor Award for Rajesh Khanna.
