= Chupke Chupke (film) =

1975 Indian film by Hrishikesh Mukherjee

- Theatrical release poster
- Directed by: Hrishikesh Mukherjee
- Screenplay by: Gulzar; D. N. Mukherjee
- Dialogues by: Gulzar
- Story by: Upendranath Ganguly
- Based on: Chhadmabeshi (novel) by Upendranath Ganguly
- Produced by: Hrishikesh Mukherjee; N. C. Sippy
- Starring: Dharmendra; Sharmila Tagore; Amitabh Bachchan; Jaya Bhaduri; Om Prakash; Asrani
- Cinematography: Jaywant Pathare
- Edited by: Pandit Shridhar Mishra; Subhash Gupta
- Music by: S. D. Burman
- Production company: Rupam Chitra
- Release date: 11 April 1975
- Running time: 127 minutes
- Country: India
- Language: Hindi

Chupke Chupke (transl. Quietly) is a 1975 Indian Hindi-language romantic-comedy film directed by Hrishikesh Mukherjee. A remake of the Bengali film Chhadmabeshi, acted by Uttam Kumar. It stars Dharmendra, Sharmila Tagore, Amitabh Bachchan, Jaya Bhaduri and Om Prakash in lead roles, with Asrani, David, Usha Kiran, Lily Chakravarty and Keshto Mukherjee in supporting roles. The music was composed by S.D. Burman.

== Plot ==
Professor Parimal Tripathi, who teaches botany, falls in love with Sulekha Chaturvedi during the botany excursion of a women's college uphill. He helps the old caretaker of the guesthouse to travel to his village downhill in order to enable him to visit his grandson, who has fallen ill. Meanwhile, Parimal disguises himself as the guesthouse caretaker to protect the old man's job, but Sulekha happens to find out about the cover-up one day. She is charmed by seeing Parimal's real personality, and the two get married. Parimal loves playing pranks and is the antithesis of regular professors, while Sulekha is in awe of Raghavendra Sharma, the so-called "highly-intellectual" husband of her older sister, Sumitra, and looks upon him as her idol. Thanks to Sulekha's excessive praise of Raghavendra, Parimal decides to prove that he is in no way a lesser mortal. An opportunity comes when Raghavendra writes a letter to Sulekha and Sumitra's older brother, Haripad, instructing him to send a driver for him who can speak pure Hindi language because his present driver, James D'Costa, uses improper dialect and mixes English words in Hindi. This provides the perfect opportunity for Parimal to get to see and interact with Raghavendra. Parimal disguises himself as "Pyare Mohan Ilahabadi", a motor-mouth driver, who pretends to criticise the English language and so speaks only pure and unmixed Hindi. Thus begins the comedy of errors as Parimal and Sulekha play prank after prank on the unsuspecting Raghavendra and Sumitra.

Firstly, the couple pretends that Sulekha is not happy with her new marriage with Parimal, and secondly, they put across the impression that Sulekha is having an extramarital affair with Pyare Mohan, and if that was not enough, they make Parimal's best friend, Sukumar Sinha, a professor of English literature, to temporarily act as Parimal and portray him as a serious and boring lecturer, the complete opposite of the real Parimal's character. Parimal's other long-time friend, Prashant Kumar Shrivastava, is also party to the prank. Vasudha, the younger sister of Prashant's wife, Lata, suspects fake "Parimal" (Sukumar) of infidelity to his wife, "Sulekha", when he tries to grow close to her. Sukumar falls in love with Vasudha, who initially believes him to be Parimal, but Sukumar reveals to her the real drama behind all this mix-up of situations, while Lata is also furious over the latest "extramarital" affair. However, towards the end, Sukumar and Vasudha escape from home and get married in a temple with the blessings of Prashant, where Haripad coerces Pyare Mohan to "kill" himself so that Parimal could surface. Thus, Raghavendra, Sumitra, and Lata come to comprehend the whole enactment, with Raghavendra finally admitting that he was truly fooled. The film revolves around the resolution of these funny mishaps.

== Cast ==
- Dharmendra as Prof. Parimal Tripathi / Pyare Mohan Allahabadi
- Sharmila Tagore as Sulekha Tripathi – Parimal’s girlfriend, later wife
- Amitabh Bachchan as Prof. Sukumar "Kumar" Sinha / fake Prof. Parimal Tripathi
- Jaya Bhaduri as Vasudha Sinha – Sukumar’s girlfriend, later wife
- Om Prakash as Raghavendra "Raghav" Sharma – Sulekha’s brother-in-law (Jija ji)
- Asrani as Prashant Kumar Srivastav – Parimal’s friend
- David as Haripad Chaturvedi – Sulekha and Sumitra’s elder brother
- Usha Kiran as Sumitra Sharma – Sulekha’s elder sister, Raghav’s wife
- Lily Chakravarty as Lata Kumar Srivastav – Prashant’s wife, Vasudha’s elder sister
- Keshto Mukherjee as James D'Costa – Raghav’s driver
- Master Vishal Desai (Bittoo) as Ratna
- Lalita Kumari as Lalita Sinha teacher
- Aarti
- Amol Sen as Om Prakash's gatekeeper
- Harish Magon as a thief
- Chaitali
- Dev Kishan as a chowkidar
- Lalita Sinha
- Nayana Apte

== Music and soundtrack ==
The music of the film was composed by S. D. Burman and the lyrics were penned by Anand Bakshi.

Chupke Chupke

Soundtrack album by S. D. Burman
- Released: April 2, 1976
- Genre: Feature film soundtrack
- Length: 17:25
- Language: Hindi
- Label: Saregama
- Producer: S. D. Burman

S. D. Burman chronology
Sagina (1974)	Chupke Chupke (1976)	Mili (1975)

Songs
No.	Title	Playback	Length
1.	"Bagon Mein Kaise Ye Phool"	Lata Mangeshkar & Mukesh	4:30
2.	"Chupke Chupke Chal Re Purbaiya" (Raga Patdeep)	Lata Mangeshkar	5:04
3.	"Sa Re Ga Ma"	Kishore Kumar & Mohammed Rafi	3:08
4.	"Ab Ke Sajan Sawan Mein"	Lata Mangeshkar	4:41
Total length:			17:25
