= Bawarchi =

1972 Indian film by Hrishikesh Mukherjee

- Promotional Poster
- Directed by: Hrishikesh Mukherjee
- Written by: Story: Tapan Sinha; Screenplay: Hrishikesh Mukherjee; Dialogues: Gulzar
- Based on: Galpo Holeo Satti by Tapan Sinha
- Produced by: Hrishikesh Mukherjee /N. C. Sippy; Romu N. Sippy
- Starring: Rajesh Khanna; Jaya Bhaduri; Asrani; Harindranath Chattopadhyay; A.K. Hangal; Durga Khote; Manisha; Kali Banerjee; Usha Kiran; Raju Shrestha
- Narrated by: Amitabh Bachchan
- Music by: Madan Mohan; Kaifi Azmi (lyrics)
- Release date: 18 August 1972
- Running time: 130 minutes
- Country: India
- Language: Hindi

Bawarchi (translation: The Chef) is a 1972 Indian Hindi-language musical comedy drama film directed by Hrishikesh Mukherjee and produced by Mukherjee himself along with N.C. Sippy and Romu N. Sippy. Released in India on 18th August 1972, the film stars an ensemble cast of Rajesh Khanna, Jaya Bhaduri, Asrani, Harindranath Chattopadhyay, A.K. Hangal, Asrani Durga Khote, Manisha, Kali Banerjee, Usha Kiran and Raju Shrestha. The film was ranked the eight highest-grossing film of the year 1972. In an interview, Khanna quoted "In Bawarchi, I did exactly the opposite of what Hrishida had made me do in Anand (1971). He allowed me to interpret the role and perform my way. I had done enough intense roles, and Bawarchi gave me the opportunity to interpret and perform the role the way I wanted. So I let myself go."

Mukherjee's style here is typical, in that the film contains no violence, and focuses rather on "the milieu of the Indian middle-class who have larger-than-life foibles and whose major concern is to survive the day [...:] which bahu will cook, which brother will use the bathroom first, who will get up first to make the morning tea, [etc.]" Khanna won his second BFJA Awards for Best Actor (Hindi) for his performance in this film.

The movie is a remake of the Bengali film Galpo Holeo Satti (1966) by Tapan Sinha. The film was remade in Tamil as Samayalkaaran with M. K. Muthu. It was remade twice in Kannada – first as Sakala Kala Vallabha, starring Shashikumar and second as No 73, Shanthi Nivasa, with Sudeep. It served as a great inspiration for the 1997 Hindi film Hero No. 1.

== Synopsis ==
The story is centered around the squabbling Sharma family, headed by their eccentric Daduji, which has a dubious reputation of the inability to retain a cook for more than a few months due to their ill treatment of their domestic helps. The family's disrepute spreads to such an extent that no person wants to be employed as a cook in their home, named Shanti Niwas (abode of peace).

Then one day a young man named Raghu offers to work as a cook, and is hired. Raghu, however, lives up to this challenge and becomes the apple of the eye of every inmate of Shanti Niwas. He even defuses the internal squabbles and re-unites the family.

== Plot ==
After the opening graphics, which use the cooking theme for good effect, the film begins with Amitabh Bachchan, being the narrator, announcing the credits against a rather oddly static red curtain, and then introducing the various characters in the story. Firstly, there are the fractious Sharma family members, who all live in the ironically named "Shanti Niwas" ("Abode of Peace"). The never-ending conflict in the house means that the family cannot keep their servants, which in turn, leads to further discord and argument. The family is controlled by the aging, disgruntled patriarch named Shivnath Sharma a.k.a. Daduji (Harindranath Chattopadhyay), who always complains about his sons, his daughters-in-law, and the lack of a decent cup of tea in the morning. Despite his grumpy demeanour, he is the only person in the house to think about the welfare of Krishna Sharma (Jaya Bhaduri), the orphaned daughter of his late second son and daughter-in-law, who both died in a car accident several years ago. The recluse Krishna is at everyone's beck and call, and yet she has a pleasant and sunny disposition, which leads her to wait on everyone with a smile and not much thought of her own comfort.

Also in the house are Daduji's first son Ramnath (A.K. Hangal), his wife Seeta (Durga Khote) and their daughter Meeta (Manisha). Ramnath is a harried clerk whose family life is impacting on his work, and also drinks to combat his woes and possibly even to help him deal with his wife and daughter, although this actually makes him more pleasant to deal with. Seeta complains of her gout which makes her unable to help with the various household chores, while Meeta is just plain lazy and does get out of bed only for dance lessons and party visits. Daduji's third son Kashinath (Kali Banerjee) is a pompous schoolteacher, who lives in the house along with his wife Shobha (Usha Kiran) and their young son Pintoo (Raju Shrestha). The last member in the family is Daduji's fourth son Vishwanath Sharma (Asrani), a music director for films, who copies English songs, adds Hindi lyrics to them and records them as Krishna aptly puts it. The final two characters in the film are Guruji (Paintal), Meeta's dance teacher, and Arun, Krishna's tutor and also love interest.

The family squabbles are based on their own selfishness, and none of them wants to take on the responsibility of looking for new servants. Into this unhappy household steps Raghunandan a.k.a. Raghu (Rajesh Khanna), who just appears on the doorstep one day, volunteering to be their new cook. Raghu seems to be the answer to everyone's prayers as he insists in a low salary, cooks amazing food and also has talents as a philosopher, singer, composer and dance instructor to name but a few. Raghu seems to be a gift from the deities as his unfailing happiness and good cheer start to have an impact on the family, as does his willingness to tackle even the most demeaning of tasks. However, Raghu does seem to have an unhealthy interest in the large box chained under Daduji's bed. This large box happens to contain the family jewelleries and added in to reports of a thief in the area makes Raghu's arrival a little suspicious. However, Raghu's unique ability to cook and his constant stream of knowledge about anything and everything soon make him indispensable to the family.

At the same time, Raghu also tutors Krishna and brings her talents to the fore. He even helps in clearing up the misunderstandings and calling truces between the family members. Daduji cannot help but think that Raghu is actually a saviour sent by the deity. Meanwhile, Raghu is well-aware that Krishna is in love with Arun, but the Sharmas are strictly against the union of Krishna with him. Arun also loves Krishna, but is helpless before Krishna's relatives as well. Amongst all the tangle, Raghu suddenly disappears from the house, while the Sharmas are also aghast to know that the jewellery box is missing as well. It does not take Daduji, Vishwanath and the Sharmas long to put two and two together. At the same time, Arun shows up and the people are already angered at the turn of events and the boy's arrival, but they receive a shock when he shows them the jewellery box. He explains that he saw Raghu in a suspicious condition with the box, and when he asked Raghu about the box, Raghu tried to run away, while he tried to stop Raghu, even beat him up (Arun is a wrestler), but Raghu threw down the jewellery box and managed to escape.

Stunned by this unexpected turn of events, the attitude of Sharmas towards Arun changes and they agree to get him married with Krishna out of gratitude. Krishna and Meeta, however, refuse to buy the story. When the Sharmas begin abusing Raghu, Arun is not able to take it anymore and confesses to them what really happened, revealing that he actually met Raghu at his own wrestling ground and had a little friendly match with Raghu, where he suffered minor injuries from him. Further, he saw the jewellery box and questioned Raghu about it, to which, Raghu answered that the box was the real reason he came there. Thus, Raghu had asked Arun to take the box to the Sharmas and lie to them that he had stolen it, so that Arun can get back his place in the house and win Krishna and the family over.

Meanwhile, Krishna sees Raghu outside the house and approaches him, asking him why did he do all this. Raghu reveals to her that his real name was "Professor Prabhakar", but he took the fake name of Raghu and posed as a servant as he had seen many families like the Sharmas which were on the brink of breaking up and hence decided to use his knowledge to stop this. A stunned Sharma family has to accept that Raghu went out of his way to save several homes like Shanti Niwas. Even though Krishna manages to stop Raghu in time from going somewhere else, Raghu tells her that this is his life's mission and now he has to go. The film ends with a scene of Raghu travelling to a new destination and Amitabh Bachchan narrating that "Raghu is going to a new home. Let's hope it's not yours."

== Cast ==
- Rajesh Khanna as Raghunandan a.k.a. Raghu (Bawarchi) / Professor Prabhakar
- Jaya Bhaduri as Krishna H Sharma
- Asrani as Vishwanath S Sharma a.k.a. Babbu
- Harindranath Chattopadhyay as Shivnath Sharma a.k.a. Daduji
- A.K. Hangal as Ramnath S Sharma a.k.a. Munna
- Durga Khote as Seeta R Sharma
- Manisha as Meeta R Sharma
- Kartar Singh Sikh man set in theatre song (More Naina Bahaye Neer Sakhi Ka)
- Kali Banerjee as Kashinath S Sharma a.k.a. Kashi
- Usha Kiran as Shobha K Sharma
- Raju Shrestha as Pintoo K Sharma
- Paintal as Guruji (Meeta's dance teacher)
- Seema Kapoor as Dancer No. 2 (dance performance night)
- Amitabh Bachchan as Narrator

== Crew ==
- Director – Hrishikesh Mukherjee
- Story – Tapan Sinha
- Screenplay – Hrishikesh Mukherjee
- Dialogue – Gulzar
- Editor – Das Dhaimade
- Producer – Hrishikesh Mukherjee, N. C. Sippy, Romu N. Sippy
- Cinematographer – Jaywant Pathare
- Art Director – Ajit Banerjee
- Animation – S. G. Naiksatam
- Choreographer – Gopi Krishna
- Narrator – Amitabh Bachchan

== Music ==
All lyrics are written by Kaifi Azmi (except "Hey Good Morning" which was penned by Gulzar); all music is composed by Madan Mohan.

Songs
No.	Title	Playback	Length
1.	"Bhor Aai Gaya Andhiyara (Raga Alhaiya Bilawal)"	Kishore Kumar, Manna Dey, Nirmala Devi, Harindranath Chattopadhyay, Lakshmi Shankar	9:29
2.	"Hey Good Morning"	Kishore Kumar, Asha Bhosle, Lakshmi Shankar, Nirmala Devi, Hrinaynath Chattopadhyay
3.	"Mast Pawan Dole Re"	Lata Mangeshkar	4:52
4.	"More Naina Bahayen Neer (Raga Jaijaiwanti)"	Lata Mangeshkar	5:03
5.	"Pahle Chori Phir Seenazori"	Kumari Faiyaz	4:09
6.	"Tum Bin Jeevan (Raga Hemant)"	Manna Dey	5:33
7.	"Kahe Kanha Karat Barjori"	Lakshmi Shankar	3:53

== Awards ==
Year	Nominee / work	Award	Result
1973	Rajesh Khanna	BFJA Awards for Best Actor (Hindi)	Won
1973	Paintal	Filmfare Best Comedian Award	Won
