= BFJA Award for Best Actor (Hindi) =

Indian film award

The Bengal Film Journalists' Association Awards is the oldest Association of Film critics in India, founded in 1937. Frequent winners include Rajesh Khanna (4 awards), Dilip Kumar, Raj Kapoor, Aamir Khan, Ajay Devgn, Amitabh Bachchan, Hrithik Roshan (2 each). Rajesh Khanna was nominated for the Best Actor Award 25 times between 1969 and 1991.

== Multiple winners ==
Wins	Recipient
5	Rajesh Khanna
2	Dilip Kumar
2	Raj Kapoor
2	Aamir Khan
2	Ajay Devgn
2	Amitabh Bachchan
2	Hrithik Roshan

== 1930s ==
- 1938: – No award given
- 1939: – No award given

== 1940s ==
- 1940: – No award given
- 1941: – No award given
- 1942: Gajanan Jagirdar – Padosi
- 1943: – No award given
- 1944: – No award given
- 1945: Gajanan Jagirdar – Ramshastri
- 1946: Prithviraj Kapoor – Devdasi
- 1947: – No award given
- 1948: – No award given
- 1949: – No award given

== 1950s ==
- 1950: – No award given
- 1951: – No award given
- 1952: – No award given
- 1953: – No award given
- 1954: – No award given
- 1955: – No award given
- 1956: – No award given
- 1957: – No award given
- 1958: – No award given
- 1959: – No award given

== 1960s ==
- 1960: – No award given
- 1961: – No award given
- 1962: Dilip Kumar – Gunga Jumna
- 1963: Guru Dutt – Sahib Bibi Aur Ghulam
- 1964: Ashok Kumar – Gumrah
- 1965: – No award given
- 1966: – No award given
- 1967: Raj Kapoor – Teesri Kasam
- 1968: Sunil Dutt – Milan
- 1969: Dilip Kumar – Sunghursh

== 1970s ==
- 1970: Ashok Kumar – Aashirwad
- 1971: Raj Kapoor – Mera Naam Joker
- 1972: Rajesh Khanna – Anand
- 1973: Rajesh Khanna – Bawarchi
- 1974: Sanjeev Kumar – Koshish
- 1975: Rajesh Khanna – Namak Haraam
- 1976: Amitabh Bachchan – Mili
- 1977: – No award given
- 1978: – No award given
- 1979: – No award given

== 1980 ==
- 1980: Rajesh Khanna – Amar Deep
- 1981: – No award given
- 1982: – No award given
- 1983: – No award given
- 1984: – No award given
- 1985: – No award given
- 1986: Naseeruddin Shah – Paar
- 1987: Rajesh Khanna – Amrit
- 1988: Sadhu Meher – Debshishu
- 1989: Shashi Kapoor – New Delhi Times

== 1990s ==
- 1990: – No award given
- 1991: – No award given
- 1992: Pankaj Kapoor – Ek Doctor Ki Maut
- 1993: Om Puri – Current
- 1994: – No award given
- 1995: Paresh Rawal – Sardar
- 1996: Aamir Khan – Akele Hum Akele Tum & Rangeela
- 1997: Ashish Vidyarthi – Is Raat Ki Subah Nahin
- 1998: – No award given
- 1999: Ajay Devgn – Zakhm

== 2000s ==
- 2000: Manoj Bajpai – Shool
- 2001: Hrithik Roshan – Fiza
- 2002: Aamir Khan – Lagaan
- 2003: Ajay Devgan – The Legend of Bhagat Singh
- 2004: Sanjay Dutt – Munna Bhai M.B.B.S.
- 2005: Nana Patekar – Ab Tak Chhappan
- 2006: Amitabh Bachchan – Black
- 2007: Hrithik Roshan – Krrish
- 2008: – No award given
- 2009: – No award given

== 2010s ==
- 2010: – No award given
- 2011: – No award given
- 2012: – No award given
- 2013: – No award given

== See also ==
- BFJA Awards
- Bollywood
- Cinema of India
