= Namak Haraam =

1973 Indian film by Hrishikesh Mukherjee

- Poster
- Directed by: Hrishikesh Mukherjee
- Written by: Gulzar; D. N. Mukherjee; Hrishikesh Mukherjee
- Produced by: Jayendra Pandya; Rajaram Satish Wagle
- Starring: Rajesh Khanna; Amitabh Bachchan; Rekha; Simi Garewal
- Cinematography: Jaywant Pathare
- Edited by: Das Dhaimade
- Music by: R. D. Burman
- Production company: Mohan Studios
- Distributed by: R. S. J. Productions; Ultra Distributors; Worldwide Entertainment Group
- Release date: 23 November 1973
- Running time: 136 minutes
- Country: India
- Language: Hindi

Namak Haraam (transl. Traitor) is a 1973 Indian Hindi-language drama film directed by Hrishikesh Mukherjee. The film stars Rajesh Khanna, Rekha, Simi Garewal and Amitabh Bachchan. It also stars Asrani, Raza Murad, A. K. Hangal, and Om Shivpuri. The music is by R. D. Burman, the screenplay by Gulzar, and lyrics by Anand Bakshi. Rajesh Khanna received his third BFJA Awards for Best Actor (Hindi) in 1974 for this film and Amitabh Bachchan had won his second Filmfare Award for Best Supporting Actor in 1974.

This was the second Hrishikesh Mukherjee film that starred Khanna and Bachchan after Anand. "Diye Jalte Hai", "Nadiya Se Dariya" and "Main Shayar Badnaam" are the most memorable melodies, all rendered powerfully by Kishore Kumar and picturised on Rajesh Khanna, who won the hearts of millions by his meaningful acting and face impressions. The film proved out to be a box office superhit and was the 5th highest-grossing film of 1973. The film was remade in Tamil as Unakkaga Naan.

This story concentrates on the rise of unions with the backdrop of Bombay's textile mills and inflation in the early 1970s.

== Plot ==
The movie opens with a prolonged flashback. Vicky (Amitabh Bachchan), showing streaks of grey in his hair, is released from prison. He is met by his friend Nisha (Simi Garewal). Upon returning home, Vicky quietly looks at a garlanded photograph of his best friend, Somu (Rajesh Khanna), prompting the story to flash back to how they ended up here.

Somu and Vicky share a deep, brotherly bond despite belonging to different social classes. Vicky is the flamboyant, lonely heir to a wealthy industrialist, Damodar Maharaj (Om Shivpuri), while Somu is a grounded youth from a lower-middle-class family. Vicky constantly craves genuine affection, which he finds in abundance within Somu’s loving family. The two friends do everything together—sharing identical shirts, sharing drinks, and dreaming of the future

When Vicky’s father falls ill, Vicky takes over managing the family’s industrial mill. Possessing a short temper and an elitist attitude, Vicky quickly clashes with Bipinlal Pandey (A.K. Hangal), the idealistic and stubborn trade union leader representing the mill workers. The confrontation escalates into a massive strike. To protect the business, Vicky’s father forces a humiliated Vicky to publicly apologize to Bipinlal.

Deeply upset by his friend's public humiliation, Somu hatches a secret plot to avenge Vicky. He goes undercover into the laborers' slum (basti) using the alias "Chander". His mission is to infiltrate the factory, win over the laborers, and systematically displace Bipinlal to destroy the union from within. Along the way, Somu settles into slum life, bonds with a cynical local poet named Alam (Raza Murad), and falls in love with a local woman named Shyama (Rekha)

Vicky helps Somu build credibility by intentionally "conceding" to Somu's demands for worker bonuses. As a result, the workers lose faith in Bipinlal, and Somu successfully wins the union leadership election.

However, the plan backfires emotionally. Living among the laborers and witnessing their crushing poverty, Somu genuinely empathizes with their plight. When an ecstatic Vicky wants to celebrate their union victory with expensive Chivas Regal, Somu refuses, sickened by the realization that a single drink costs more than a worker's daily wage. Somu shifts sides completely, choosing to use his position to fight honestly for worker rights, fair pay, and better conditions. Vicky feels deeply abandoned. Influenced by his cynical father's warnings that the middle class is inherently untrustworthy, Vicky begins viewing his best friend as a namak haraam (a traitor/ungrateful tool). Their brotherly bond fractures into a tense ideological feud. To permanently crush the labor union and break the friends' alliance, Vicky's father plays dirty. First, he publicly exposes Somu's true identity as management's stooge to the angry workers, inciting mass chaos and strikes. Then, behind Vicky's back, Damodar orchestrates a fatal truck incident to have Somu assassinated. Though Vicky realizes what is happening and rushes to intervene, he arrives too late; Somu is brutally killed.

Horrified by his father's cold-blooded ruthlessness and consumed by grief over Somu's death, Vicky decides to punish his father the only way he can. He takes the legal blame for masterminding the murder, destroying his father's dreams of an heir. Vicky willingly serves 14 years in prison. The film concludes as Vicky, now having served his time , steps back into society, resolving to dedicate the remainder of his life to fighting for the labor rights Somu died protecting.

== Cast ==
- Rajesh Khanna as Somnath Chander Singh (Somu)
- Amitabh Bachchan as Vikram Maharaj (Vicky)
- Rekha as Shyama
- Simi Garewal as Manisha
- A. K. Hangal as Bipinlal Pandey
- Asrani as Dhondu, Shyama's brother
- Manmohan as Jai Singh
- Om Shivpuri as Damodar Maharaj
- Raza Murad as Alam
- Jayshree T. as Courtesan

Friendly appearances

- Durga Khote as Somu's mother
- Manju as Rama, Pandey's assistant
- Manisha as Sarla

== Production ==
In an attempt to recreate the death scene in Anand (1971) and be remembered as a hero, Rajesh Khanna wanted his character to die a heroic death, which was a deviation from Gulzar's script. This left Amitabh Bachchan disturbed after he found out about it the day of the shoot, and he never co-starred with Khanna again. Raza Murad revealed in an interview that at one point while filming, both Khanna and Bachchan were on a call and Mukherjee had the doors locked in order for the shoot to finish on time.

== Music ==
All lyrics are written by Anand Bakshi; all music is composed by Rahul Dev Burman.

Songs
| No. | Title | Playback | Length |
|---|---|---|---|
| 1. | "Main Shair Badnaam" | Kishore Kumar | 5:21 |
| 2. | "Diye Jalte Hain Phool Khilte Hain" | Kishore Kumar | 3:40 |
| 3. | "Nadiya Se Dariya Dariya Se Saagar" | Kishore Kumar | 4:11 |
| 4. | "Woh Jhoota Hai Vote Na Usko Dena" | Kishore Kumar | 3:29 |
| 5. | "Sooni Re Sejaria" | Asha Bhosle and Usha Mangeshkar | 2:38 |

== Awards and nominations ==
| Year | Nominee / work | Award | Result |
|---|---|---|---|
| 1974 | Amitabh Bachchan | Filmfare Award for Best Supporting Actor | Won |
| 1974 | Asrani | Filmfare Best Comedian Award | Nominated |
| 1974 | Gulzar | Filmfare Best Dialogue Award | Won |
| 1974 | Rajesh Khanna | BFJA Awards for Best Actor (Hindi) | Won |
