= Raja Rani (1973 film) =

- Poster
- Directed by: Sachin Bhowmick
- Written by: Sachin Bhowmick
- Produced by: Jagdish Kumar
- Starring: Rajesh Khanna; Sharmila Tagore
- Cinematography: V. Babasaheb
- Edited by: Pratap Dave
- Music by: R.D. Burman
- Production company: Filmkunj Pictures
- Release date: 15 January 1973
- Country: India
- Language: Hindi

Raja Rani (transl. King, queen) is a 1973 Hindi-language film. The film stars Rajesh Khanna and Sharmila Tagore. The supporting cast included Sujit Kumar, Farida Jalal, Iftekhar, Dulari and Asit Sen. Mumtaz makes a guest appearance as herself. Produced by Jagdish Kumar, the film is written and directed by veteran writer Sachin Bhowmick.

The film's music was composed by R. D. Burman. His real-life wife Asha Bhosle received a Filmfare Nomination as Best Female Playback Singer for the song "Jab Andhera Hota Hai," the only nomination for the film. As per the review of the film made in 2014 by the Hindu newspaper, the film did well at the box office and taking into consideration, the inflation as of 2014, the film would have grossed more than 100 crores. The attire worn by Khanna was sleeveless shirt and trousers, thick leather belt on waist, shoes without socks and a black cap. The Hindu review noted "On a lesser actor, the attire would have fallen flat, but Khanna, as a small time thief, carries it with characteristic élan."

== Plot ==
A young widow commits suicide when she is compelled to forgo her modesty to save her child from illness. The child runs away on seeing his dead mother and becomes a thief named Raja. Raja is a very handsome and intelligent thief who manages to steal and escape from the police every time. He lives with his friend Tony, who dreams of marrying his girlfriend Mary. Raja once steals from a house one night, and the police chase him. To escape from the police, he enters a marriage hall and in bridegroom's room. He finds a letter from the groom who ran away, as he does not want to marry the girl his father arranged for him. Raja disguises himself as the groom, veiling his face with flowers when the original groom's father knocks on the door. Raja eventually marries the girl in the marriage hall. He feels troubled on whatever happened and he escapes from the room during the nuptial night without even seeing who is his wife as she also veiled her face with wedding dress. The groom's father and the bride misunderstands that original groom has escaped from the hall. Raja is caught by police and he sets to jail for six months. The original groom dies in an accident on the same night. Nirmala (the girl whom Raja married) is thrown out by her in-laws as she is an unlucky girl because of which their son died. Nirmala returns to her uncle's home where she is not welcomed due to their financial position. She wanders everywhere and she finds no help from anybody rather try to spoil her modesty. She turns to a courtesan and dances for her living.

Raja is released from jail and he searches for the girl he married. When he does not find the whereabouts of that girl he returns to his normal life of stealing. He hires a room and stays with his friend Tony near the place where Nirmala, now courtesan Rani, resides. Raja visits Rani's home to escape from police and he sees Rani dancing. Something makes him feel bad and he slaps Rani and throws away one of the clients who tried to misbehave with her. Rani does not get angry but she likes Raja slapping her. Rani and Raja, without knowing about their relation to each other, start to develop a feeling of love towards each other.

Rani insists Raja to stop stealing and Raja insists she stop dancing. Both decide to live a decent life. Rani changes the mind of one of her clients and because of which his wife accepts her as her sister as she saved her husband from doing wrong. Raja finds a job as school van conductor. But he loses his job when the school finds he was thief before. Raja and Rani do a small business of selling snacks but are charged for child theft one day. The father of the child is the man whom Rani changed from becoming bad. Rani and Raja are released and they become good friends of the man's family. The wife of the person invites to their child's birthday party and gives her good saree and necklace to wear on that day. Rani loses the necklace given by the man's wife. To return the necklace they struggle a lot as it costs in thousands. Raja and Rani are compelled to break the promise made to each other without each other's knowledge. Raja goes to steal in home and gets caught. He finds Rani dancing in front of the owner of the house. When the owner of the house tries to misbehave with Rani, Raja rushes to save her. In a struggle, the owner is killed and Raja is blamed for that.

Raja is arrested and taken to court, he is able to justify himself and is acquitted. Raja and Rani marry in the end.

== Cast ==
- Rajesh Khanna as Raja
- Sharmila Tagore as Nirmala/Rani
- Ravi Sharma as Police Inspector
- Master Manoj as child artist Raja
- V K Sharma as Tony/Raja's friend
- Iftekhar as Nirmala's/Rani's Father in law/a lawyer
- Indrani Mukherjee as Janki - Raja's Mother

== Soundtrack ==
Lyricist: Anand Bakshi

#	Title	Singer(s)
1	"Main Ek Chor Tu Meri Rani"	Kishore Kumar, Lata Mangeshkar
2	"Jab Andhera Hota Hai"	Bhupinder Singh, Asha Bhosle
3	"Ja Re Ja Maina Tujhe"	Lata Mangeshkar
4	"Na Tum Se Hui Na"	Lata Mangeshkar
5	"Phir Aankh Se Ansoo"	Lata Mangeshkar
6	"Haan To Main Kya"	Mukesh, Rajesh Khanna, Lata Mangeshkar
