= Apna Desh =

- Poster
- Directed by: Jambu
- Written by: Inder Raj Anand; Raj Baldev Raj
- Story by: Mullapudi Venkata Ramana
- Based on: Kathanayakudu (1969 film) by Mullapudi Venkata Ramana
- Produced by: A.V. Subramaniam; T.Govindarajan
- Starring: Rajesh Khanna; Mumtaz; Om Prakash; Jagdeep; Madan Puri
- Cinematography: W.R. Subba Rao; Pushpal Dutta
- Edited by: C. P. Jambulingam
- Music by: R. D. Burman
- Production company: Venus Pictures
- Distributed by: Olympics Pictures
- Release date: 26 May 1972
- Running time: 170 minutes
- Country: India
- Language: Hindi

Apna Desh (transl. Our country) is a 1972 Indian Hindi-language action drama film, produced by A.V. Subramaniam and T.M.Kittu and directed by Jambu. The film stars Rajesh Khanna, Mumtaz, Om Prakash, Jagdeep, Mukkamala, Madan Puri and the credited Roja Ramani, who plays Rajesh Khanna's niece Sharda. The soundtrack is composed by R. D. Burman with lyrics by Anand Bakshi.

The film is a remake of the 1969 Telugu film Kathanayakudu. The child chorus for the song "Rona Kabhi Nahi Rona" was done by Sandhya Pandit and Vijeyta Pandit, who are elder sisters of music directors Jatin-Lalit.

== Plot ==
Akash is an honest and educated young man, employed by the Bombay Municipal Corporation as a clerk. He lives with his equally honest brother Dinanath, his sister-in-law, a niece, Sharda and a nephew. Due to Akash's honesty, he becomes a liability to his corrupt superiors. Dharmdas tries to bribe Akash but Akash denied it to do so. Chanda is in love with Akash and Akash also knows it and both agree to it. Dharamdas plans to give Money to Dinanath to deposit in the bank and told his assistant that on the way, he will send goons to snatch money from Dinanath and make him guilty. But Dinanath discovers this plan and takes money from the locker and runs away. Dharamdas learns about the money stealing. One day, they find fault with his work and arrange a board meeting. In the board meeting, people accuses Akash for demanding bribe from Dharamdas and take voting in which people voted to remove Akash from the position and dismiss him. Akash outsmarts Dharamdas in bidding. Akash takes the help of Alibaba to bluff Dharamdas and team. When Akash attempts to assert himself legally, he finds that there is corruption everywhere. In retaliation, even his brother is implicated in a crime, and arrested. Now, Akash must come up with a way to clear his brother, as well as expose the wrong-doers.

== Cast ==
- Rajesh Khanna as Akash Chandra
- Mumtaz as Chanda / Madame Popololita
- Om Prakash as Dharmadas
- Jagdeep as Shambhu / Ali Baba
- Kanhaiyalal as Sevaram
- Madan Puri as Satyanarayan
- Mukkamala
- Manmohan Krishna as Dinanath Chandra
- Pandari Bai as Mrs. Dinanath Chandra
- Rajan Haksar as Doctor
- Satyendra Kapoor Chanda's brother
- Datta Bhat as villager
- Gurnam Singh as Aakash's senior officer

== Soundtrack ==
#	Title	Singer(s)
1	"Kajra Lagake Gajra Sajake"	Kishore Kumar, Lata Mangeshkar
2	"Ro Na Kabhi Nahin Rona"	Kishore Kumar, Vijeyta Pandit, Sandhya Pandit
3	"Sun Champa Sun Tara"	Kishore Kumar, Lata Mangeshkar
4	"Duniya Mein Logon Ko"	R D Burman, Asha Bhosle
5	"Aaja O Mere Raja"	Asha Bhosle
6	"E Babu Lelo Na Narial"	Lata Mangeshkar
7	"Main toh manu tohe saiyyan"	Lata Mangeshkar [unreleased]

The song "Parda" is a medley from the 2010 Hindi feature film Once Upon a Time in Mumbaai contained samples from different 1970's Bollywood songs; one of them was "Duniya Mein Logon Ko".
