= Anand (1971 film) =

1971 Indian film by Hrishikesh Mukherjee

- Theatrical release poster
- Directed by: Hrishikesh Mukherjee
- Written by: Screenplay: Bimal Dutta; Gulzar; D.N. Mukherjee; Hrishikesh Mukherjee; Biren Tripathy; Dialogues: Gulzar
- Story by: Hrishikesh Mukherjee
- Produced by: Hrishikesh Mukherjee; N. C. Sippy
- Starring: Rajesh Khanna; Amitabh Bachchan; Sumita Sanyal; Ramesh Deo
- Cinematography: Jaywant Pathare
- Edited by: Hrishikesh Mukherjee
- Music by: Salil Chowdhury
- Distributed by: Digital Entertainment; Shemaroo Video Pvt. Ltd.
- Release date: 12 March 1971
- Running time: 122 minutes
- Country: India
- Language: Hindi
- Box office: ₹1.7 crore (equivalent to ₹89 crore or US$9.2 million in 2026)

Anand (transl. Joy) (Note: Also the title character.) is a 1971 Indian Hindi-language drama film co-written and directed by Hrishikesh Mukherjee, with dialogues written by Gulzar. It stars Rajesh Khanna in the lead role, with a supporting cast including Amitabh Bachchan, Sumita Sanyal, Ramesh Deo and Seema Deo.

The film won several awards, including the Filmfare Award for Best Film in 1972. In 2013, it was listed in Anupama Chopra's book 100 Films To See Before You Die.

== Plot ==
At an award ceremony in Mumbai for his first book, 'Anand', Dr. Bhaskar Banerjee is asked to speak about the book. Bhaskar says that the book has been written based on his diary excerpts when he met Anand and narrates to the audience his experience with him.

Bhaskar, an oncologist, treats the poor for no charge but is often disheartened by the fact that he cannot cure all the ailments in the world. He becomes pessimistic after seeing the suffering, illness, and poverty all around him. He is straightforward and will not treat the imaginary ailments of the rich. His friend, Dr. Prakash Kulkarni, follows a slightly different path. He treats the imaginary illnesses of the rich and uses that money to treat the poor.

One day, Kulkarni introduces Bhaskar to Anand, who has lymphosarcoma of the intestine, a rare type of cancer. Anand has a cheerful nature and despite knowing that he is not going to survive for more than six months, he maintains a nonchalant demeanor and always tries to make everyone around him happy. His cheerful and vibrant nature soothes Bhaskar, who has a contrasting nature and they become good friends. Anand has the rare quality of attracting people and befriending them. In one such encounter, he makes Isa Bhai, a theater actor, his friend. They enjoy each other's company and create an emotional bond.

Anand's condition gradually deteriorates, but he does not want to spend his remaining days in a hospital bed; he, instead, roams free and helps everyone. He discovers that Bhaskar has strong feelings for Renu, whom he had treated previously for pneumonia. He helps Bhaskar express his love and convinces Renu's mother to bless their marriage. He tells Bhaskar that everyone should remember him as a lively person and not as a cancer patient. It is also discovered that he loved a girl back in Delhi who is now married to someone else because of Anand's illness. The day she got married, Anand came to Mumbai from Delhi to move on from her but kept a flower in his book in her memory. Anand becomes sicker with time and is now bound to the house. He records Bhaskar saying a poem and himself delivering dialogue and both of them laughing together on tape. He is counting his last breaths as his friends gather around him, but Bhaskar is gone to bring medicines for him. He shouts for him and dies. Bhaskar comes back just a few minutes later and begs Anand to speak to him. Suddenly, the tape starts playing with Anand's voice and his friends cry for him. A couple of balloons are seen flying away in the sky as Anand leaves the world.

== Cast ==
- Rajesh Khanna as Anand Sehgal
- Amitabh Bachchan as Dr. Bhaskar Banerjee a.k.a. Babu Moshai
- Sumita Sanyal as Renu Bhaskar Banerjee
- Ramesh Deo as Dr. Prakash Kulkarni
- Seema Deo as Suman Kulkarni
- Lalita Pawar as Matron D'Sa
- Durga Khote as Renu's mother
- Johnny Walker as Isa Bhai Suratwala / Morarilal
- Asit Sen as Chandra Nath
- Dev Kishan as Raghu Kaka
- Dara Singh as Wrestling Coach aka Papaji
- Brahm Bhardwaj as Mauni Baba

== Production ==
Mukherjee was loosely inspired by Ikiru, and initially considered Shashi Kapoor and his brother Raj Kapoor for the lead role in the early 1960s. The character of Anand was inspired by Raj Kapoor, who used to call Mukherjee "Babu Moshay". It is believed that Mukherjee wrote the film when once Kapoor was seriously ill and Mukherjee thought that he may die. The film was dedicated to Kapoor and the people of Bombay.

Later, Mukherjee thought of making the film in Bengali language, with Uttam Kumar as Babu Moshai. When this plan also failed, he considered Kishore Kumar and Mehmood (as Babu Moshai) in lead roles. One of the producers, N. C. Sippy, had earlier served as Mehmood's production manager. Mukherjee was asked to meet Kishore Kumar to discuss the project. However, when he went to Kishore Kumar's residence, he was driven away by the gatekeeper due to a misunderstanding. Kishore Kumar (himself a Bengali) was involved in a financial dispute with a Bengali event manager over a stage show. He had instructed his gatekeeper to drive away this "Bengali", if he ever visited the house. The gatekeeper mistook Hrishikesh Mukherjee to be that "Bengali", and refused him entry. The incident hurt Mukherjee and he decided not to work with Kumar. Consequently, Mehmood had to leave the film as well. According to Dharmendra, he was also considered for the lead role before it went to Rajesh Khanna. As a playback singer, Kishore Kumar had become the preferred voice for Khanna by this time, but Anand did not have any song by him.

Mukherjee initially signed Sanjeev Kumar for Babu Moshai's role, but Khanna did not want to work with Kumar. On Khanna's insistence, Mukherjee replaced Kumar with Amitabh Bachchan.

Hrishikesh Mukherjee shot the film in 28 days. The screenplay of Anand was written by Gulzar (who also wrote the dialogue and the lyrics of a few songs), Bimal Dutt, D.N. Mukherjee and Hrishikesh Mukherjee.

Later, Anand was remade in Malayalam, with the name Chitrashalabham.

== Music ==
The background score and songs were composed by Salil Chowdhury, with lyrics by Gulzar and Yogesh. Gulzar also wrote the poem "Maut Tu Ek Kavita Hai", which is narrated by Amitabh Bachchan.

Before confirming Salil Chowdhury to compose the songs, Mukherjee approached Lata Mangeshkar, as she had previously worked as a music director in Marathi films under the pseudonym "Anandghan." However, she politely declined the offer to compose and chose to sing the songs in the film instead.

One of the songs, "Kahin Door Jab Din Dhal Jaye," was originally composed and written 20 years earlier as a Bengali song titled "Amay Prashna Kare Neel Dhrubatara," and was sung by Hemant Kumar.

The background music used in the emotional scenes of the film is based on the tune of the song "Koi Hota Jisko Apna" from Mere Apne, which was released later the same year. The music for both films was composed by Chowdhury.

Anand was one of Rajesh Khanna's few films that do not feature his longtime collaborator Kishore Kumar in their soundtracks.

Track listing
No.	Title	Lyrics	Singer(s)	Length
1.	"Kahin Door Jab (Male)" (Raga Yaman Kalyan, with Pahadi)	Yogesh	Mukesh	05:40
2.	"Maine Tere Liye"	Gulzar	Mukesh	03:09
3.	"Zindagi Kaisi Hai Paheli" (Raga Alhaiya Bilawal)	Yogesh	Manna Dey	03:30
4.	"Na Jiya Lage Na" (Raga Malgunji)	Gulzar	Lata Mangeshkar	03:22
5.	"Maut Tu Ek Kavita Hai"	Gulzar	Amitabh Bachchan	00:47
Total length:				16:28

== Reception and legacy ==
Anand was a modest box-office success. The film is counted among the consecutive commercial successes of Rajesh Khanna during the period 1969–1971, alongside films such as Maryada (1971) and Andaz (1971). Over the years, Anand has gained a cult following and is widely regarded as one of the greatest Hindi films ever made. Indiatimes included it in its list of "25 Must Watch Bollywood Films". Anand is also notable for being one of only two films to star both Rajesh Khanna and Amitabh Bachchan, the other being Namak Haraam (1973), which was also directed by Hrishikesh Mukherjee.

== Awards ==
Year	Award	Category	Recipient(s)	Result
1971	National Film Awards	Best Feature Film in Hindi	Hrishikesh Mukherjee and N. C. Sippy	Won
1972	Bengal Film Journalists' Association Awards	Best Actor (Hindi)	Rajesh Khanna	Won
1972	19th Filmfare Awards	Best Film	Hrishikesh Mukherjee and N. C. Sippy	Won
1972	19th Filmfare Awards	Best Director	Hrishikesh Mukherjee	Nominated
1972	19th Filmfare Awards	Best Story	Hrishikesh Mukherjee	Won
1972	19th Filmfare Awards	Best Editing	Hrishikesh Mukherjee	Won
1972	19th Filmfare Awards	Best Actor	Rajesh Khanna	Won
1972	19th Filmfare Awards	Best Supporting Actor	Amitabh Bachchan	Won
1972	19th Filmfare Awards	Best Dialogue	Gulzar	Won

== Impact ==
Till the time of the release of Anand, the star of the film, Amitabh Bachchan, was not recognized in public. Sharing the incident on Twitter, a fan-Aashish Palod reminded him of how he got recognition from the film. On the release day of the film, Bachchan went to a petrol pump to fill up the tank of his car and no one recognized him. But, after the release of the film in the evening, when he went to the same petrol pump for a refill, the public started identifying him. Bachchan posted on Twitter, "this is a true happening .. it was the petrol pump at Irla, on SV Road."
