= Maryada (1971 film) =

- Poster
- Directed by: Arabind Sen
- Written by: Satish Bhatnagar
- Screenplay by: Suhrid Kar
- Story by: Suhrid Kar
- Produced by: Arabind Sen
- Starring: Mala Sinha; Raaj Kumar; Rajesh Khanna; Pran
- Cinematography: N. V. Srinivas
- Edited by: Shankar Hurde
- Music by: Kalyanji–Anandji
- Production company: Lalit Kala Mandir
- Distributed by: Lalit Kala Mandir
- Release date: May 28, 1971
- Running time: 152 mins
- Country: India
- Language: Hindi
- Box office: 4.5 crore

Maryada (meaning decorum, conduct) is a 1971 Indian Hindi-language tragedy film directed by Arabind Sen. The film stars Rajesh Khanna, Raaj Kumar and Mala Sinha. This film is counted among the 17 consecutive hit films of Khanna between 1969 and 1971, by adding the two-hero films Maryada and Andaz to the 15 consecutive solo hits he gave from 1969 to 1971.

== Plot ==
Lalita (Mala Sinha) lives with her widowed mother (Dulari) in a small village in India. One day while traveling by road, she is stranded, and a young man named Raja Babu (Rajesh Khanna) comes to her assistance. Both fall in love with each other. When she informs her mother about her love for Raja, she is met with strong opposition, as her mother knows that Raja Babu is already married and has a son. She also reminds Lalita about her marriage with Diwan (Abhi Bhattacharya). When Lalita meets with Raja, he admits to her that he is not Raja but his real name is Rajan Ram Bahadur, but refuses to divulge any other information to her. She decides that she will have nothing to do with him. The mystery deepens when Pran Bahadur (Pran), the step-brother of Raja Babu returns and wants to confront the young man who has taken over Raja's identity, with results that will change the lives of everyone around them forever.

== Cast ==
- Mala Sinha as Laxmi / Lalita
- Raaj Kumar as Raja Babu
- Rajesh Khanna as Raja Babu / Rajan Ram Bahadur
- Pran as Pran Bahadur, Raja's step-brother
- Rajendra Nath
- Bipin Gupta as Ram Bahadur, Rajan Bahadur's father
- Asit Sen as Dhondumal
- Jankidas as Seth Kirodimal
- Abhi Bhattacharya as Diwan (Lalita's husband)
- Dulari as Lalita's mom
- Helen as the dancer in the item number "Dil Ka Lena Dena"

== Soundtrack ==
The film score is composed by the musical duo Kalyanji–Anandji. The lyrics were written by Anand Bakshi. Vocals are supplied by Kishore Kumar (for Khanna), Mohammed Rafi (for Raaj Kumar), Lata Mangeshkar (for Sinha) and Asha Bhosle (for Helen), with one song by Mukesh rendered for Khanna.

=== Track listing ===
No.	Title	Singer(s)	Length
1.	"Gussaa Itanaa Hasin Hai To Pyaar Kaisaa Hogaa"	Kishore Kumar
2.	"O Ladki Diwani Suno Ek Kahaani"	Kishore Kumar
3.	"Chupke Se Dil De De"	Kishore Kumar, Lata Mangeshkar
4.	"Tu Bhi Aajaa Ke Aa Gai Rut (Duet)"	Lata Mangeshkar, Mohammed Rafi
5.	"Dil Ka Lena Dena Humne"	Asha Bhosle, Mohammed Rafi
6.	"Zuban Pe Dard Bhari Dastaan Chali Aayi"	Mukesh
7.	"Mohabbat Ke Suhane Din" (raga Charukesi)	Mohammed Rafi
8.	"Tu Bhi Aa Ja Ki Aa Gayi Rut (solo)"	Lata Mangeshkar
