= Amar Deep (1979 film) =

1979 film

- Directed by: R. Krishnamurthy; K. Vijayan
- Produced by: K. Balaji
- Starring: Rajesh Khanna; Vinod Mehra; Shabana Azmi; Deven Verma; Bindu; Roopesh Kumar
- Music by: Laxmikant–Pyarelal
- Release date: 18 May 1979
- Country: India
- Language: Hindi

Amar Deep is a 1979 Bollywood romantic drama film directed by R. Krishnamurthy and K. Vijayan and produced by K. Balaji. The film stars Rajesh Khanna in the lead role supported by Vinod Mehra, Shabana Azmi. The film was a remake of Tamil film Dheepam (1977) which itself was a remake of Malayalam film Theekkanal (1976). It was a box office hit and marked Khanna's comeback after a dull phase.

== Plot ==
Raja is adopted by a don at a young age. After the don's death, Raja inherits his property. However, wealth and power make him arrogant. He wants to marry Radha, the daughter of his servant, Ramu. Raja asks for Ramu's permission to marry her and Ramu accepts the proposal. But Radha refuses to do so as she loves Kishan. Raja finds out about this and complains to Ramu. Ramu forbids his daughter to meet Kishan. Then Raja finds out a secret from Kishan's past which changes his attitude towards him. He gives Kishan a job and arranges his marriage with Radha. Raja entrusts Kishan with a lot of responsibility which means Kishan has to travel for work all the time. Kishan eventually starts to become suspicious about Raja's kindness towards him. Does Raja want Kishan to be out of the way so he can be near Radha, or is there another reason?

== Cast ==
- Rajesh Khanna as Raja / Sonu
- Vinod Mehra as Kishan
- Shabana Azmi as Radha
- Deven Verma as Rahim
- Bindu as Asha
- Roopesh Kumar as Ramesh
- A. K. Hangal as Ramu Kaka
- Deepa as Lata
- Mithun Chakraborty as Sajan (Cameo)
- Ashok Kumar as Don (Cameo)
- Savitri as Sonu and Kishan's Mother (Cameo)

== Soundtrack ==
All the songs were composed by Laxmikant–Pyarelal with lyrics written by Anand Bakshi.

Song	Singer
"Koi Na Tere Pehle Thi"	Kishore Kumar
"Tum Nahin Maanoge, Tum Nahin Jaanoge"	Kishore Kumar, Anuradha Paudwal
"Halki Si Kasak Masak Hoti Hai Dil Mein"	Kishore Kumar, Lata Mangeshkar
"Duniya Mein Sada"	Mohammed Rafi
"Duniya Hai Bewafa"	Asha Bhosle
