= Ashok Kumar =

Indian actor (1911–2001)

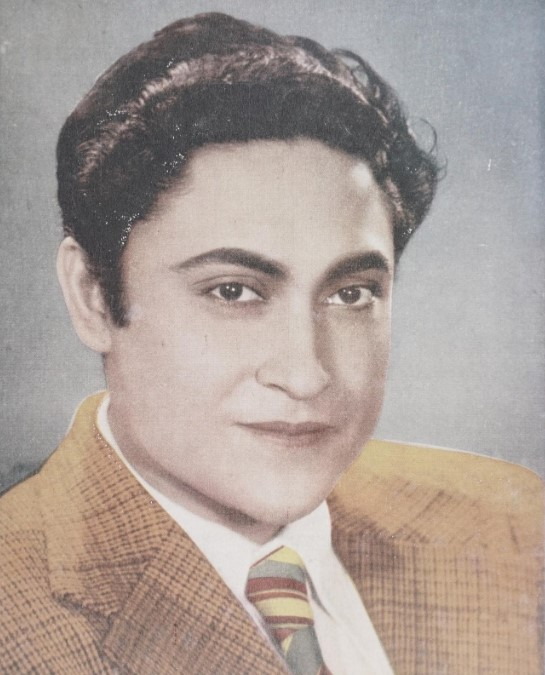
- Born: Kumudlal Ganguly; 13 October 1911; Bhagalpur, Bengal Presidency, British India (present-day Bhagalpur, Bihar, India)
- Died: 10 December 2001 (aged 90); Mumbai, Maharashtra, India
- Other name: Dadamoni
- Education: Presidency College, Calcutta
- Occupations: Actor, producer, painter, singer
- Years active: 1934–1997
- Works: Filmography
- Spouse: Shobha Devi (m. 1938)
- Children: 4, including Preeti Ganguly
- Relatives: See Ganguly family See Mukherjee-Samarth family
- Awards: Full list; Dadasaheb Phalke Award (1988)
- Honours: Padma Shri (1962); Padma Bhushan (1999)

Signature
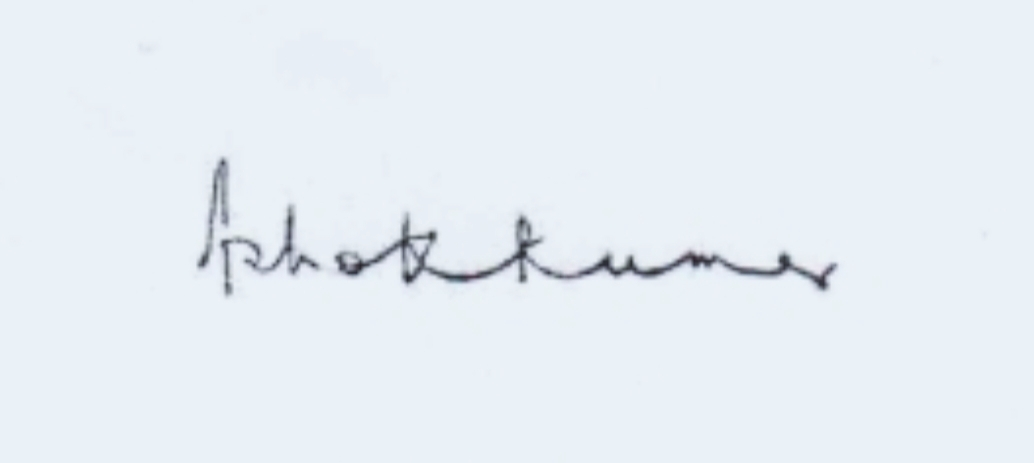

Ashok Kumar (born Kumudlal Ganguly; 13 October 1911 – 10 December 2001) was an Indian actor who worked in Hindi cinema. He is regarded as one of the greatest and most successful actors in the history of Indian cinema. He is considered to be the first superstar of Indian cinema as well as the first lead actor to play an anti-hero. He also became the first star to reinvent himself, enjoying a long and hugely successful career as a character actor. He was a member of the cinematic Ganguly family. He was honoured in 1988 with the Dadasaheb Phalke Award, the highest national award for cinema artists, by the Government of India. He received the Padma Shri in 1962 and Padma Bhushan in 1999 for his contributions to Indian cinema.

== Background and personal life ==
Ashok Kumar was born Kumudlal Ganguly into a Bengali Brahmin family in Bhagalpur, Bengal Presidency, British India (present-day Bihar, India). His father, Kunjlal Ganguly, was a lawyer while his mother, Gouri Devi, was a housewife. Kumudlal was the eldest of four children. His only sister, Sati Devi (born 1916), was married at a very young age to Sashadhar Mukherjee in 1932 and became the matriarch of a large "film family". Next was his brother, Kalyan, 16 years younger (b.1927), who later took the screen name Anoop Kumar. Youngest of all was Abhas (b.1929), whose screen name was Kishore Kumar, who became a phenomenally successful playback singer in Hindi films. Although the eldest by several years, Kumudlal outlived all his siblings. Notably, he stopped celebrating his birthday after his youngest brother, Kishore, died on the same day in 1987.

After a failed marriage proposal owing to the opposition regarding his newly made career in films, young Kumudlal was later married to Shobha (a first cousin of actress Chhaya Devi), a girl of his own Bengali Brahmin community and similar family background on 20 April, 1938, in a match arranged by their parents in the usual Indian way. Their lifelong marriage was a harmonious and conventional one, and despite his film career, the couple retained a very middle-class outlook and value system, bringing up their children with traditional values in a remarkably simple home. They were the parents of one son, Aroop Ganguly, and three daughters named Bharati Patel, Rupa Verma and Preeti Ganguly. Aroop Kumar Ganguly worked in only one film, appearing as a hero in Bezubaan (1962), which flopped at the box office. He then made a career in the corporate world. The eldest daughter, Bharati Patel, is the mother of the actress Anuradha Patel. His second eldest daughter, Rupa Ganguly, is a former actress and widow of actor-comedian Deven Verma. The youngest daughter, Preeti Ganguly acted as a comedienne in several Hindi films during the 1970s and 1980s and died unmarried in 2012.

Kumudlal's daughter Bharati married twice. Her first marriage was to Dr. Veerendra Patel, a Gujarati doctor. Through this marriage, she had two sons, Rahul and Rohit, and one daughter, the actress Anuradha Patel, who is married to the actor Kanwaljit Singh. Later, and much against the wishes of all her relatives, Bharati married Hameed Jaffrey, a Muslim, the brother of the actor Saeed Jaffrey. By this second marriage, Bharati had one son, Saahil, and also acquired step-daughters, Geneviève and Shaheen, who were Hameed's daughters by his first wife Valerie Salway, a woman of Scottish, Irish, Portuguese and Spanish heritage. Geneviève married a Sindhi businessman named Jagdeep Advani. Their daughter is actress Kiara Advani. Thus, Ashok Kumar has no blood relationship with Kiara Advani but he is related to her in her family tree. In all, Kumar had eight biological grandchildren - Bharati's four children Rahul, Rohit, Anuradha and Saahil, and Aroop's four children Rishi, Mihir, Tushar and Somdatta (from his marriage to Nirmala Ganguly), in addition to his step-granddaughters Geneviève and Shaheen.

Ganguly was educated at Presidency College of the University of Calcutta, Kolkata, where he studied to become a lawyer. However, his heart was not in his law studies. Ganguly was more interested in cinema, in which he dreamt of working as a technician.

== Career ==
=== Debut and breakthrough (1936–1942) ===
Kumar reluctantly made his debut in the year 1936 with Franz Osten's Jeevan Naiya alongside Devika Rani.

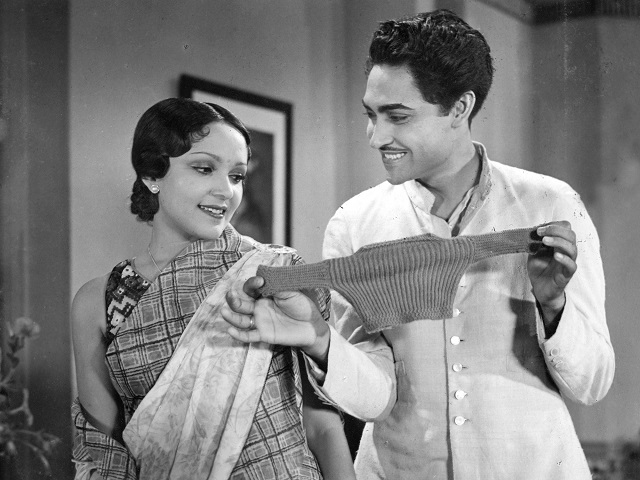
With Devika Rani in Nirmala (1938)

His breakthrough came the same year with another Franz Osten film, Achhut Kannya, a reformist piece featuring a Brahmin boy falling in love with a girl from the so-called untouchables in Indian society. After the huge box office success of Achhut Kanya, he delivered a hat-trick of silver jubilee hits with Kangan (1939), Bandhan (1940) and Jhoola (1941), all opposite Leela Chitnis.

=== Superstardom (1943–1959) ===
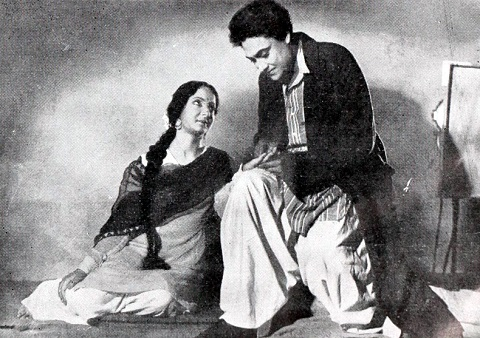
Ashok Kumar in the 1943 film Kismet

In 1943, Ashok Kumar played the lead role in Gyan Mukherjee's drama film Kismet opposite Mumtaz Shanti. It became the first film to present the main lead as an anti-hero as well as an unmarried girl getting pregnant. Despite having themes considered way ahead of times, Kismet became the first Indian film to do a nett business of ₹10 million (US$110,000) and emerged an All Time Blockbuster at the box office. It ran in Kolkata's Roxy Cinema for 184 weeks, a record which remains unbroken till date. Kismet also got the tag of being the first true blue mega blockbuster in the history of Indian cinema. Its music, especially the patriotic song "Aaj Himalay Ki Choti Se" written by Kavi Pradeep was highly successful and played big role in making Kismet a box office sensation. The mass hysteria created by Kismet made Kumar the first big superstar of Indian cinema. Such was his popularity at the time that, in the words of Manṭo, "Ashok's popularity grew each passing day. He seldom ventured out, but wherever he was spotted, he was mobbed. Traffic would come to a stop and often the police would have to use lathis to disperse his fans". The huge box office success of Kismet was followed by films, such as Gyan Mukherjee's Chal Chal Re Naujawan (1944), Mehboob Khan's Humayun (1945) and Kishore Sahu's Sajan (1947), all three of which received critical acclaim and emerged box office hits.

In 1949, Kumar produced and starred in Kamal Amrohi's Mahal, which had Madhubala as the female lead. Recalled as Hindi cinema's first horror film, Mahal went on to become a blockbuster at the box office and third highest-grossing film of the year, behind Barsaat and Andaz. The film made Madhubala an overnight sensation and launched the career of Lata Mangeshkar who sang Aayega Aanewala, which remains popular till date. Mahal also became the source of inspiration for several films like Madhumati (1958), Mehbooba (1976), Karz (1980) and Om Shanti Om (2007). The early-1950s saw the rise of younger crop of stars like Dilip Kumar, Dev Anand and Raj Kapoor, but Kumar remained rock-steady and continued to deliver huge hits throughout the decade. In 1950, Kumar delivered another blockbuster and highest-earning film of the year with Ramesh Saigal's Samadhi opposite Nalini Jaywant. That same year, he reunited with Jaywant and Gyan Mukherjee for Sangram. After Kismet, Kumar again donned the hat of anti-hero for Sangram, in turn adding another huge hit in his kitty. In 1951, he starred in B. R. Chopra's crime drama film Afsana and Nitin Bose's romantic musical Deedar. Afsana in which Kumar played a double role was the first hit of Chopra as a filmmaker and made him a notable name in the industry while Deedar co-starring Nargis and Dilip Kumar also proved to be a major commercial success.

Kumar's only notable release of 1952 was M. L. Anand's romantic drama Bewafa which also had Nargis and Raj Kapoor in the lead. In 1953, he produced and starred in Bimal Roy's romantic drama Parineeta alongside Meena Kumari. Based upon the 1914 Bengali novel of the same name by Sarat Chandra Chattopadhyay, it proved to be a critical and commercial success. Post-Parineeta, Kumar had three unsuccessful ventures in Baadbaan (1954), Sardar (1955) and Bandish (1955), but this changed with a superhit in B. R. Chopra's family drama film Ek Hi Raasta (1956), acting alongside Meena Kumari and Sunil Dutt. He also had successes in M. V. Raman's Bhai-Bhai and Shakti Samanta's Inspector, the same year and Devendra Goel's Ek Saal, the next year.

In 1958, Kumar added one more superhit in his kitty with Satyen Bose's musical comedy Chalti Ka Naam Gaadi, which also had his brothers Anoop Kumar and Kishore Kumar in the lead. The film gained cult status in later years and got remade twice in Hindi and once in Marathi. Its soundtrack composed by S. D. Burman was highly successful with a number of hit songs, including "Babu Samjho Ishaare", "Ek Ladki Bheegi Bhaagi Si", "Hum The Woh Thi Aur Sama Rangeen" and "Haal Kaisa Hai Janaab Ka". His other major release of the year was Shakti Samanta's crime thriller Howrah Bridge which had Madhubala opposite him. The film opened to positive response from critics and proved to be a hit. Its dance numbers - "Mera Naam Chin Chin Chu" sung by Geeta Dutt which brought fame to Helen and "Aaiye Meharban" sung by Asha Bhosle were hugely popular among the masses. Kumar's last notable film in his prime came with Yash Chopra's maiden directional venture Dhool Ka Phool (1959), co-starring Mala Sinha, Rajendra Kumar and Nanda. It opened to critical acclaim and emerged a blockbuster at the box office.

=== Continued success, acclaim and expansion to television (1960–1984) ===
With the beginning of the 1960s, Kumar was open to all kind of roles, whether as main lead, second lead, or in a character role. This prevented him from being type-cast and he continued to receive acclaim for his work.

It started with B. R. Chopra's courtroom drama Kanoon (1960) which also had Rajendra Kumar and Nanda in the lead. Despite not having any songs and other gimmicks required in a commercial Hindi film, Kanoon emerged a hit and went on to win National Film Award for Best Feature Film (Hindi). After playing a brief role in Yash Chopra's critically acclaimed partition drama Dharmputra (1961), the following year, he did lead roles in A. Bhimsingh's Rakhi and Phani Majumdar's Aarti. Both Rakhi and Aarti received critical acclaim and proved to be box office hits. Kumar received his first Filmfare Award for Best Actor for his portrayal of a doting brother in Rakhi. 1963 proved to be a hugely successful year for Kumar with many successes. He first collaborated with B. R. Chopra for the romantic thriller Gumrah co-starring Sunil Dutt, Mala Sinha, Shashikala and Nirupa Roy. Gumrah did very well at the box office and proved to be a superhit. For his performance in the film, Kumar won his first BFJA Award for Best Actor (Hindi). The film won National Film Award for Third Best Feature Film in Hindi. This was followed by Bimal Roy's critically and commercially successful drama film Bandini. Bandini was the last feature film directed by Roy and won him his final Filmfare Award for Best Director along with National Film Award for Best Feature Film (Hindi) as well as Filmfare Award for Best Film. Before the end of year, he reunited with Rajendra Kumar in H. S. Rawail's muslim social Mere Mehboob, co-starring Sadhana and Nimmi. The film topped box office chart in 1963 and emerged an All Time Blockbuster. Its music composed by Naushad dominated the year-end annual list of Binaca Geetmala and was the second best-selling Hindi film album of the 1960s.

In 1964, Kumar delivered two moderately successful films with A. Bhimsingh's Pooja Ke Phool and Inder Raj Anand's Phoolon Ki Sej which had Dharmendra and Manoj Kumar in the lead respectively, but his other releases, such as Chitralekha and Benazir flopped at the box office. In 1965, he had a hit in Bheegi Raat and a semi-hit in Oonche Log. The hit streak continued in 1966 with Asit Sen's Mamta which again had Dharmendra in the lead along with Suchitra Sen who played a double role. It was a successful venture domestically, but an All Time Blockbuster in overseas markets. The same year, Kumar also appeared in Brij Sadanah's Afsana which was a box office failure, but won him Filmfare Award for Best Supporting Actor. 1967 was a notable year for him as he starred in two of the biggest hits of the year - Vijay Anand's spy heist thriller Jewel Thief and A. Bhimsingh's light hearted drama film Mehrban. Both the films proved to be critical and commercial successes with Kumar getting applauded for his performances in them and receiving a nomination in the Filmfare Award for Best Supporting Actor category for the latter.

In 1968, he played the lead role in Hrishikesh Mukherjee's social drama Aashirwad. Although the film did not do well at the box office, it was a huge critical success, winning National Film Award for Best Feature Film (Hindi). Kumar's portrayal of a loving father was very well received and won him all the major accolades that year, such as National Film Award for Best Actor, Filmfare Award for Best Actor and BFJA Award for Best Actor (Hindi). One of its song "Rail Gaadi Chhuk Chhuk Chhuk Chhuk" sung by Kumar himself is considered the first rap song of Indian cinema. Kumar ended the decade on a high. He co-starred alongside Sanjay Khan and Sadhana in R. K. Nayyar's mystery thriller Intaqam which went on to become a superhit at the box office. He then did a guest appearance in Samanta's romantic blockbuster Aradhana which made Rajesh Khanna a superstar. Kumar also reunited with Hrishikesh Mukherjee for drama film Satyakam which like their previous collaboration Aashirwad met with immense acclaim and won National Film Award for Best Feature Film (Hindi).

The 1970s saw the domination of whole new generation of stars, including Rajesh Khanna, Dharmendra, Amitabh Bachchan, Manoj Kumar, Shashi Kapoor, Vinod Khanna, Jeetendra and Rishi Kapoor. Kumar worked with all of them in various successful and acclaimed films. In 1970, he played important roles in two directional ventures of Asit Sen, Sharafat co-starring Dharmendra, Hema Malini and Safar which also had Rajesh Khanna, Sharmila Tagore, Feroz Khan in the lead. Both the films emerged superhits and received big thumbs from reviewers, especially Safar which won Sen his first Filmfare Award for Best Director. He also collaborated with Manoj Kumar for his second directional, the patriotic drama Purab Aur Paschim, which proved to be a blockbuster in India as well as overseas. The following year, he appeared in acclaimed ventures, such Naya Zamana, Guddi and Adhikar. In 1972, he starred in Kamal Amrohi's magnum opus Pakeezah which had Meena Kumari as the eponymous lead, alongside Raaj Kumar. Despite getting mixed reviews and being a slow starter, it went on to become a massive blockbuster and also the final film appearance of Kumari who died few weeks after its release. Kumar then played the role of a doting grandfather in Samanta's Anuraag and a crook in Sadanah's Victoria No. 203. Both the films emerged superhits with Kumar again getting nominated in the Filmfare Award for Best Supporting Actor category for Anuraag. That same year, he reunited with Rajesh Khanna for Maalik and Dil Daulat Duniya, but contrary to expectations, both the films flopped commercially.

Kumar played small roles in both of his major releases of 1973 and 1974 which were - Dhund and Prem Nagar, respectively. In 1975, he had a superhit in Chori Mera Kaam co-starring Shashi Kapoor and Zeenat Aman. He also appeared alongside Amitabh Bachchan and Jaya Bachchan in Mili. It did average business, but won massive acclaim and is now considered a film ahead of its times. The following year, Kumar saw four profitable ventures in Ek Se Badhkar Ek, Barood, Chhoti Si Baat and Suntan. He received his fifth and final nomination in the Filmfare Award for Best Supporting Actor category for his heartfelt portrayal of a retired colonel in Chhoti Si Baat. His other successful films of the decade, include Dream Girl (1977), Anand Ashram (1977), Safed Jhooth (1977), Chala Murari Hero Banne (1977), Dil Aur Deewaar (1978), Anpadh (1978) and Khatta Meetha (1978).

Kumar began the next decade with supporting role in five hit films, including Khubsoorat, Jyoti Bane Jwala, Sau Din Saas Ke, Judaai and Takkar. In 1981, he had two more box office successes with Shibu Mitra's Maan Gaye Ustaad and Pramod Chakravarty's Jyoti. He then played the lead role in Basu Chatterjee's comedy drama Shaukeen (1982), which was a commercial as well as critical success and is now considered a cult classic. In 1983, he appeared in another of Basu Chatterjee's acclaimed venture Pasand Apni Apni and Sunil Dutt's drama film Dard Ka Rishta, which proved to be a box office hit. The following year, Kumar made his television debut with the soap opera Hum Log, which was telecasted on Doordarshan and presented the story of an Indian middle-class family from the 1980s and their daily struggles. Every episode ended with the Kumar in a sharp suit and dark glasses explaining the theme of the day and prodding viewers to think about what they had just watched. During its 1 and a half-year run, he received over 400,000 letters from young viewers, asking him to convince their parents in marriage of their choice. The show proved to be a huge success with each episode having a regular viewing audience of more than 50 million.

=== Further works and retirement (1985–1997) ===
In 1985, Kumar played a notable supporting role in B. R. Chopra's drama film Tawaif. The film opened to positive response from reviewers and emerged a major commercial success. In 1986, he played the title role in B. R. Chopra's acclaimed and successful television show Bahadur Shah Zafar. The following year, he appeared in Shekhar Kapoor's superhero film Mr. India, which was a major critical and commercial success, followed by two more hits films, Watan Ke Rakhwale and Jawab Hum Denge. Towards the end of decade, Kumar's workload slowed due to declining health. His major releases in 1988 and 1989 - Inteqam and Clerk, respectively, were critical and commercial failures.

In the early-1990s, he appeared in films, such as Majboor (1990), Begunaah (1991), Humlaa (1992) and Aasoo Bane Angaarey (1993), but they did not succeed at the box office. During this period, success came with the TV shows Bheem-Bhavani (1990) and Tehkikaat (1994). Kumar received Lifetime Achievement Award at the 41st Filmfare Awards, which was held in the year 1996. The same year, he reunited with Dev Anand and Dharmendra for Return of Jewel Thief, which was highly anticipated before release, but ended up as a loss making venture. Kumar quit acting after making an appearance in Ashim Samanta's romantic drama Ankhon Mein Tum Ho (1997) starring Sharad Kapoor, Suman Ranganathan and Rohit Roy.

== Death ==
Ashok Kumar died at the age of 90 in Mumbai on 10 December 2001 of heart failure at his residence in Chembur. The then Prime Minister Atal Bihari Vajpayee described him as "an inspiration... for many generations of aspiring actors.

== Artistry and legacy ==
"[H]e was the first to apply "normal" acting in our industry; until Ashok Kumar we had jatra-style acting or screen acting that followed theatrical trends. [H]e is the man who showed that film acting is something else. He began to speak and to behave normally."

— Filmmaker Tapan Sinha; as quoted in the Encyclopaedia of Indian Cinema (1999)

Kumar was one of the leading actors of Hindi cinema during the late 1930s and the 1940s. He appeared in Box Office India's "Top Actors" list eight times: from 1940 to 1945, and from 1949 to 1950. Kumar is credited with introducing natural acting to Hindi cinema; the distinctive style and mannerisms that he adopted in his later career still remain extremely popular among mimicry artists.

Kumar had an eye for talent and helped several up-and-coming artists get a break. He groomed Hrishikesh Mukherjee during the director's association with Bombay Talkies. The filmmaker went on to helm movies, such as Anari (1959), Asli-Naqli (1962), Anupama (1966), Aashirwad (1968), Satyakam (1969), Anand (1971), Chupke Chupke (1975) and Khubsoorat (1980). He produced Neel Kamal (1947), Ziddi (1948) and Mahal (1949) which launched the careers of Raj Kapoor, Dev Anand and Madhubala respectively. He also collaborated with Shakti Samanta for Inspector (1956) and Howrah Bridge (1958), which proved to be game-changers for the then struggling filmmaker. Filmfare included his performance in Aashirwad in its list of "80 Iconic Performances".

He inspired many of his younger contemporaries, including Dilip Kumar, Dev Anand, Raj Kapoor to succeeding generations of artists, such as Shammi Kapoor, Manoj Kumar and Raaj Kumar among others.

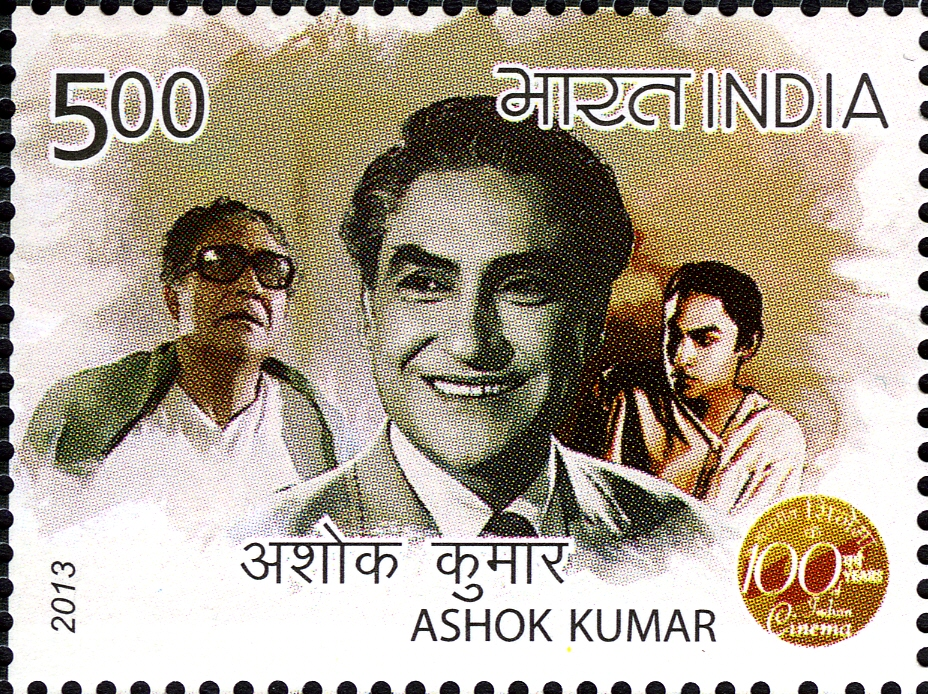
A commemorative postage stamp featuring Kumar, released in 2013

In 2013, India Post issued a commemorative postage stamp featuring Kumar as part of a set of 50 stamps dedicated to eminent Indian film personalities. In 2022, he was placed in Outlook India's "75 Best Bollywood Actors" list.

== Bibliography ==
- Akbar, Khatija (1997). Madhubala: Her Life, Her Films. Hay House. ISBN 978-93-80480-81-7.
- Elley, Derek (1977). World Filmography: 1967. Fairleigh Dickinson University Press. ISBN 978-0-498-01565-6.
- Ghosh, Nabendu (1995). Ashok Kumar: His Life and Times. Indus. ISBN 978-81-7223-218-4.
- Valicha, Kishore (1996). Dadamoni: the authorized biography of Ashok Kumar. Viking. ISBN 978-0-670-87271-8.
- Burra, Rani (1990). Ashok Kumar, Green to Evergreen. Directorate of Film Festivals, Ministry of Information and Broadcasting, Govt. of India.
- Manṭo, Saʻādat Ḥasan (2003). Black Margins: Stories. Katha. ISBN 978-81-87649-40-3.
- Manṭo, Saʻādat Ḥasan (2010). Stars from Another Sky: The Bombay Film World of the 1940s. Penguin. ISBN 978-0-14-343011-7.
- Patel, Bhaichand (2012). Bollywood's Top 20: Superstars of Indian Cinema. Penguin Books India. pp. 28–39. ISBN 978-0-670-08572-9.
