= Qutb Minar =

Minaret in the Mehrauli area of Delhi, India

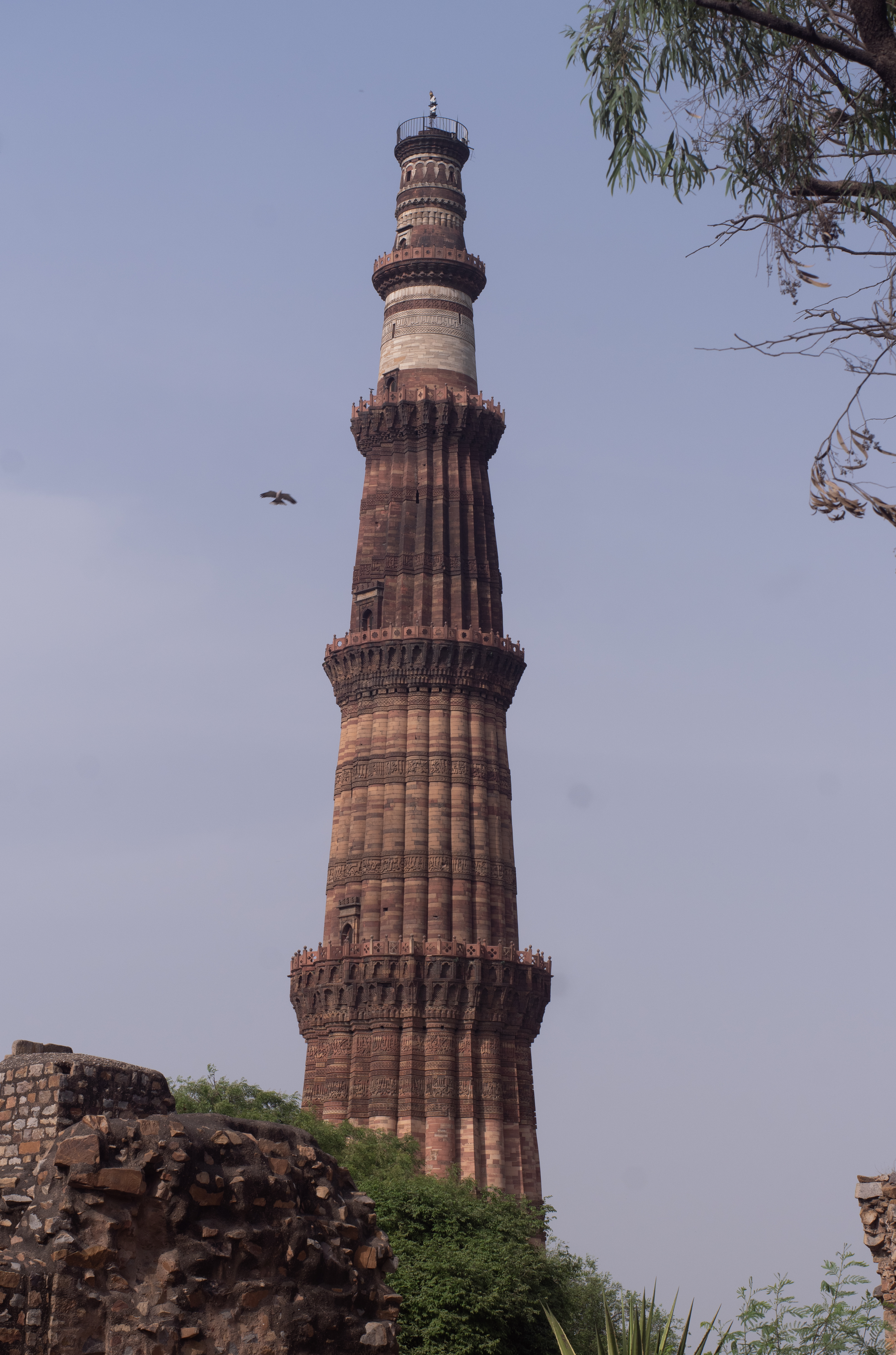
- Minar in Delhi, India
- Interactive map of Qutb Minar
- 28.524355°N 77.185248°E

Site notes
- Height: 72.5 metres (238 ft)
- Architectural style: Islamic Architecture

UNESCO World Heritage Site
- Type: Cultural
- Criteria: 4
- Designated: 1993 (17th session)
- Reference no.: 233
- Country: India
- Continent: Asia
- Construction: Started in 1199 by Qutb ud-Din Aibak / completed in ~ 1220 by his son-in-law Iltutmish

The Qutb Minar, also spelled Qutub Minar and Qutab Minar, is a minaret and victory tower, built during the Delhi sultanate, and comprising the Qutb complex, a UNESCO World Heritage Site in Mehrauli, South Delhi, India. It was mostly built between 1199 and 1220, contains 399 steps, and is one of the most frequented heritage spots in the city. After defeating Prithviraj Chauhan, the last Hindu ruler of Delhi before the Ghurid conquest of the region, Qutab-ud-din Aibak initiated the construction of the victory tower, but only managed to finish the first level. It was to mark the beginning of Islamic rule in the region. Successive dynasties of the Delhi Sultanate continued the construction, and, in 1368, Firuz Shah Tughlaq rebuilt the top parts and added a cupola.

It can be compared to the 62-metre all-brick Minaret of Jam in Afghanistan, of c. 1190, which was constructed a decade or so before the probable start of the Delhi tower. The surfaces of both are elaborately decorated with inscriptions and geometric patterns. The Qutb Minar has a shaft that is fluted with "superb stalactite bracketing under the balconies" at the top of each stage. In general, minarets were slow to be used in India and are often detached from the main mosque where they exist.

=== Reuse of Hindu and Jain temple materials ===
The Quwwat-ul-Islam Mosque, situated next to the Qutb Minar in Delhi, was built by Qutb ud-Din Aibak in the late twelfth century, following the Ghurid conquest of Delhi. According to the Archaeological Survey of India (ASI), the mosque was constructed in 1198 using carved pillars and other architectural materials from 27 Hindu and Jain temples demolished by Aibak. The ASI states that this is recorded in an inscription on the mosque's main eastern entrance. The reused temple materials are visible in the columns and architectural details of the mosque's courtyard and surrounding cloisters. UNESCO also records the incorporation of carved pillars and other elements associated with Hindu and Jain temples into the mosque's construction. The Government of Delhi's tourism department similarly records the use of materials from 27 demolished Hindu and Jain temples. These accounts concern the mosque within the Qutb complex, rather than the Qutb Minar tower itself.

== Architecture ==
The tower includes elements of traditional Islamic architecture and southwestern Asian design. Elizabeth Lambourn's Islam Beyond Empires: Mosques and Islamic Landscapes in India and the Indian Ocean studies the introduction of Islam in South Asia and how the region influenced the Islamic religious architecture. These newly arrived Muslims from the Islamic West escaped the Mongol Empire and emigrated to India, where they constructed religious centers. The Qutb Minar serves as a central marker for these new Muslim communities while also serving as a reminder of Islam's presence in the area. The architecture of the minaret varies greatly from that of the typical style and design of the mosques constructed in the Middle East. The style of these structures is influenced by the local architecture such as the Indic temples. This affected the different materials, techniques, and decoration that were used in the construction of the Qutb Minar.

Historically, tower minarets were uncommon in South Asian-Islamic design until the 17th century, due to the slow adoption of the typical Middle Eastern style in India. It is also detached from the main mosque, showcasing how the native culture affected the design of a Middle Eastern structure. The Qutb Minar is seen as the "earliest and best example of a fusion or synthesis of Hindu-Muslim traditions" according to Ved Parkash in his essay The Qutb Minar from Contemporary and Near Contemporary Sources. Like many mosques built in South Asia during this time period, the minaret was constructed by Hindu laborers and craftsmen but overseen by Muslim architects. This led to a construction that synthesized both Hindu and Islamic religious architecture. Since some of the craftsmen were Hindu and unfamiliar with the Quran, the inscriptions are a compilation of disarranged Quranic texts and other Arabic expressions.

== History ==
The Qutb Minar stands within the Qutb complex in Mehrauli, Delhi, on the site of the former Lal Kot citadel. Construction of the tower began under Qutb ud-Din Aibak around 1199, following the establishment of Ghurid rule in Delhi. His successor, Iltutmish, added further storeys. The tower formed part of the early architectural development of the Delhi Sultanate and stood beside the Quwwat-ul-Islam Mosque.

The Quwwat-ul-Islam Mosque, situated north-east of the tower, was constructed by Aibak in the late twelfth century. According to the Archaeological Survey of India (ASI), its original courtyard and cloisters were built using carved pillars and other architectural materials from 27 Hindu and Jain temples demolished under Aibak. The ASI states that the demolition and reuse of these materials are recorded in an inscription at the mosque's main eastern entrance. The UNESCO World Heritage Centre also identifies the use of materials from earlier temples in the construction of the mosque.

The mosque retains carved columns and other architectural elements from the earlier Hindu and Jain structures. These remains have been studied by archaeologists and architectural historians. Mrinalini Rajagopalan, in her study of the Qutb complex, examines the reuse of temple materials and the different interpretations that have developed around the monument.

The mosque courtyard also contains the Iron pillar of Delhi, which predates the establishment of the Delhi Sultanate. Its Sanskrit inscription, written in Brahmi script, refers to a king named Chandra and describes the pillar as a Vishnudhvaja, or standard of the Hindu deity Vishnu. The pillar is generally dated to the Gupta period and provides evidence of the area's earlier history.

The mosque was subsequently enlarged under Iltutmish and Alauddin Khalji. Other monuments were added to the complex, including the Alai Darwaza and the unfinished Alai Minar. The Qutb Minar itself underwent repairs and alterations during later centuries. It was damaged by an earthquake in 1505 and repaired under Sikandar Lodi. Further damage occurred during the earthquake of 1803.

In the nineteenth century, British military engineer Robert Smith carried out restoration work on the tower and added a cupola above its uppermost storey. The cupola was removed in 1848 and placed nearby. It subsequently became known as "Smith's Folly".

=== Modern disputes over the complex ===
The history and religious associations of the Qutb complex have been the subject of public debate and legal proceedings. In April 2022, Vishva Hindu Parishad spokesperson Vinod Bansal claimed that the Qutb Minar had originally been a "Vishnu Stambh". The claim was reported by The Hindu and other news organisations. This interpretation differs from the account presented by the ASI and UNESCO, which identify the tower as a structure begun during the early Delhi Sultanate.

In 2022, petitions seeking the restoration of Hindu and Jain worship at the mosque complex were considered by a Delhi court. The petitioners referred to the earlier temples and surviving religious sculptures. The ASI opposed changing the protected monument's religious status to permit worship, citing the legal provisions governing centrally protected monuments.

The Qutb Minar and its surrounding monuments were designated a UNESCO World Heritage Site in 1993.

== The Ghurids ==
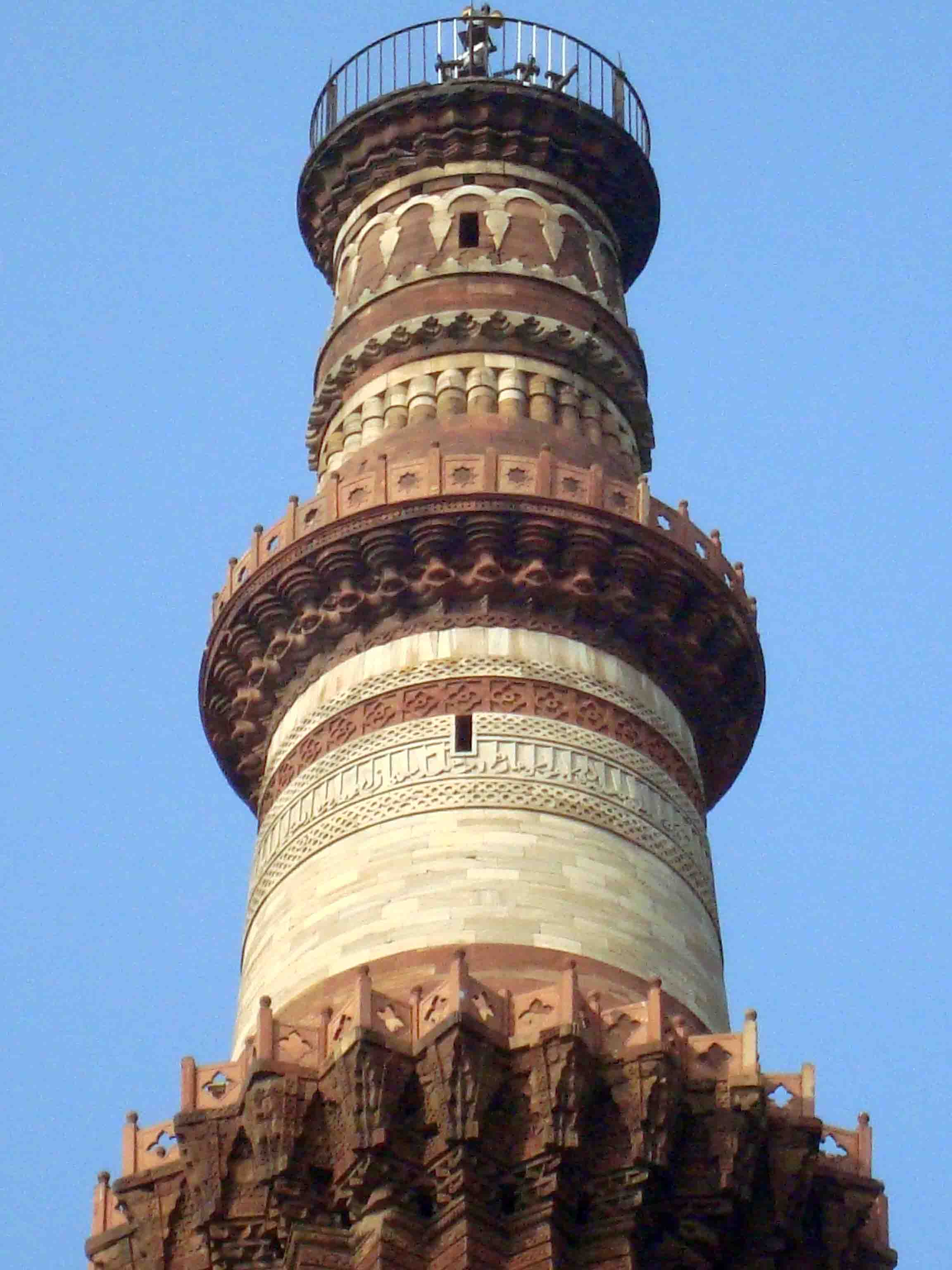
Decorative motifs on upper levels

The construction of the Qutb Minar was planned and financed by the Ghurids, who emigrated to India and brought Islam with them. The Ghurids, historically known as the Shansabanis, were a clan of Tajik origin that hailed from Ghur, the mountainous region of modern-day western Afghanistan. Between the late eleventh century and the early twelfth century, the different sects of this nomadic clan united, relinquishing their nomadic culture. During this time, they also embraced Islam.

They subsequently expanded into modern-day India and quickly took control of a substantial part of the country. The Ghurids annexed Multan and Uch in the western Punjab in 1175–76, the northwestern regions around Peshawar in 1177, and the region of Sindh in 1185–86. In 1193, Qutb al-Din Aibak conquered Delhi and implemented a Ghurid governorship in the province, and the congregational mosque, the Qutb Minar complex, was founded in 1193. In the past, scholars believed that the complex was constructed to promote adoption of Islam amongst the Ghurids' new subjects as well as a symbol of the Ghurids' adherence to a socio-religious system. There is now new information to suggest that spurring the adoption of Islam was not a top priority of the new annexes and instead the Ghurid governors sought to make a synthesis of the local culture and Islam through negotiation.

== Patrons and architects ==
Qutb-ud-din Aibak, a deputy of Muhammad of Ghor, who founded the Delhi Sultanate after Muhammad of Ghor's death, started construction of the Qutb Minar's first story in 1199. Aibak's successor and son-in-law Shamsuddin Iltutmish completed a further three stories. After a lightning strike in 1369 damaged the then top story, the ruler at the time, Firuz Shah Tughlaq, replaced the damaged story and added one more. Sher Shah Suri also added an entrance while he was ruling and the Mughal emperor Humayun was in exile.

== Architecture ==
Qutb Minar in Mehrauli in Delhi. Clifton and Co., circa 1890

Persian-Arabic and Nagari in different sections of the Qutb Minar reveal the history of its construction and the later restorations and repairs by Firuz Shah Tughlaq (1351–88) and Sikandar Lodi (1489–1517).

The height of Qutb Minar is 72.5 meters, making it the tallest minaret in the world built of bricks. The tower tapers, and has a 14.3 metres (47 feet) base diameter, reducing to 2.7 metres (9 feet) at the top of the peak. It contains a spiral staircase of 379 steps.

At the foot of the tower is the Quwat Ul Islam Mosque. The Minar tilts just over 65 cm from the vertical, which is considered to be within safe limits.

Qutb Minar was an inspiration and prototype for many minarets and towers built. The Chand Minar and Mini Qutub Minar bear resemblance to the Qutb Minar and inspired from it.

== Levels ==
The stories of the Qutb Minar vary in size, style, and material due to varying architects and builders constructing each section.

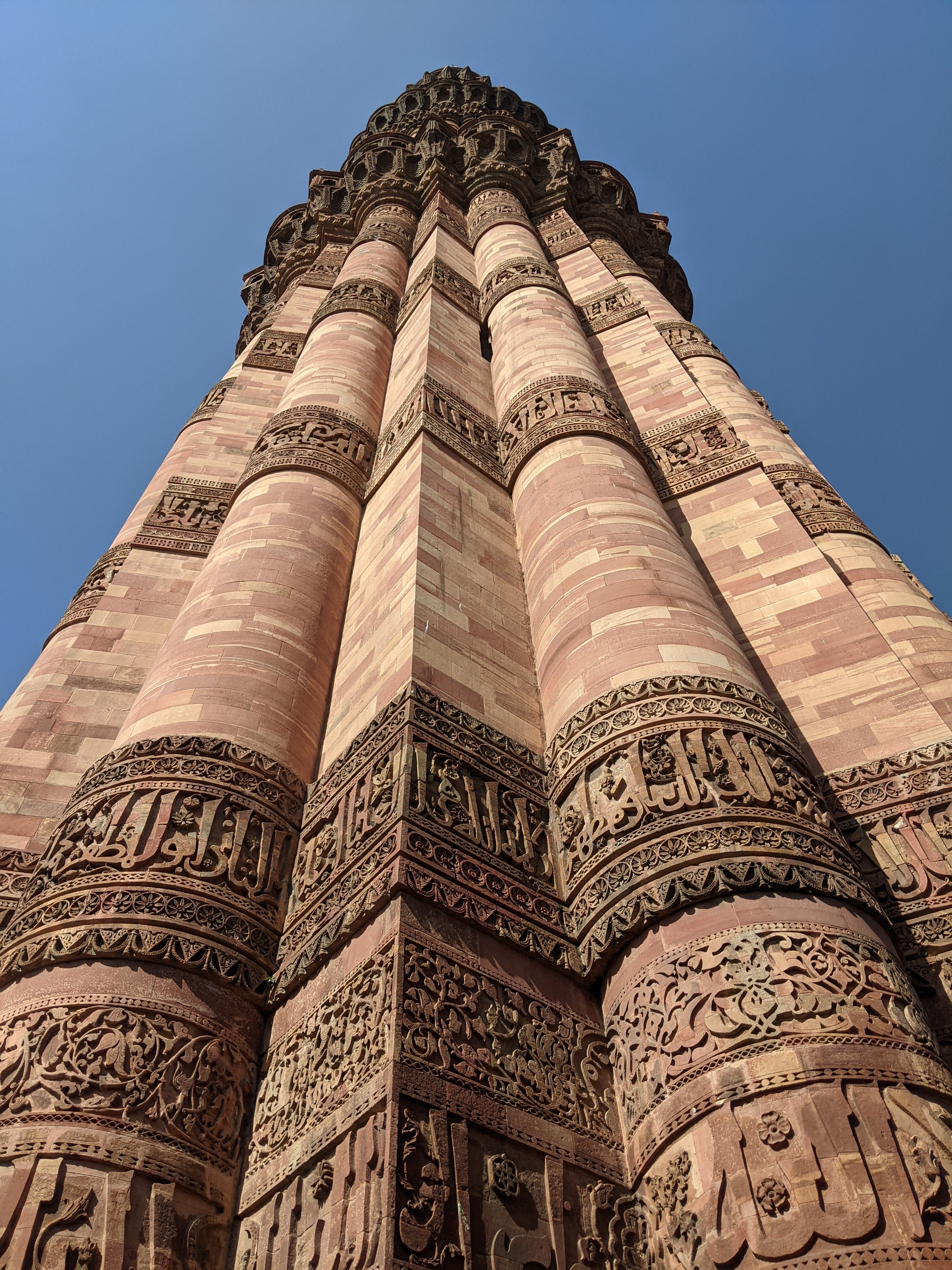
Inscriptions at the base

=== Basement ===
The Qutb Minar consists of five stories of red and grey sandstone. The lowest story, also known as the basement story, was completed during the lifetime of Ghiyath al-Din Muhammad, a sultan of the Ghurid dynasty.

It is revetted with twelve semicircular and twelve flanged pilasters that are placed in alternating order. This story is separated by flanges and by storied balconies, carried on Muqarnas corbels. The story is placed on top of a low circular plinth that is inscribed with a twelve-pointed star with a semicircle placed with each of the angles between the star's points.

There are also six horizontal bands with inscriptions inscribed in naskh, a style of Islamic calligraphy, on this story. The inscriptions are as follows: Quran, sura II, verses 255–60; Quran, sura LIX, verses 22–23, and attributes of God; The name and titles of Ghiyath al-Din; Quran, sura XLVIII, verses 1–6; The name and titles of Mu’izz al-Din; and Qur’anic quotations and the following titles in this much restored inscription: "The Amir, the most glorious and great commander of the army." This level also has inscriptions praising Muhammad of Ghor, the sultan of the Ghurids.

=== Second, third, and fourth stories ===
The second, third, and fourth stories were erected by Sham ud-Din Iltutmish, the first Muslim sovereign to rule from Delhi. He is considered to be the first of the Delhi Sultan dynastic line. The second and third stories are also revetted with twelve semicircular and twelve flanged pilasters that are placed in alternating order. These red sandstone columns are separated by flanges and by storied balconies, carried on Muqarnas corbels. Prior to its reconstruction and reduction, the fourth story was also decorated with semicircular pilasters. It was re-constructed in white marble and is relatively plain.

=== Fifth story ===
In 1369, the fourth story was repaired after lightning struck the minaret. During reconstruction, Sultan Firuz Shah Tughlaq elected to reduce the size of the fourth story and then separated it into two stories.

== Controversy ==
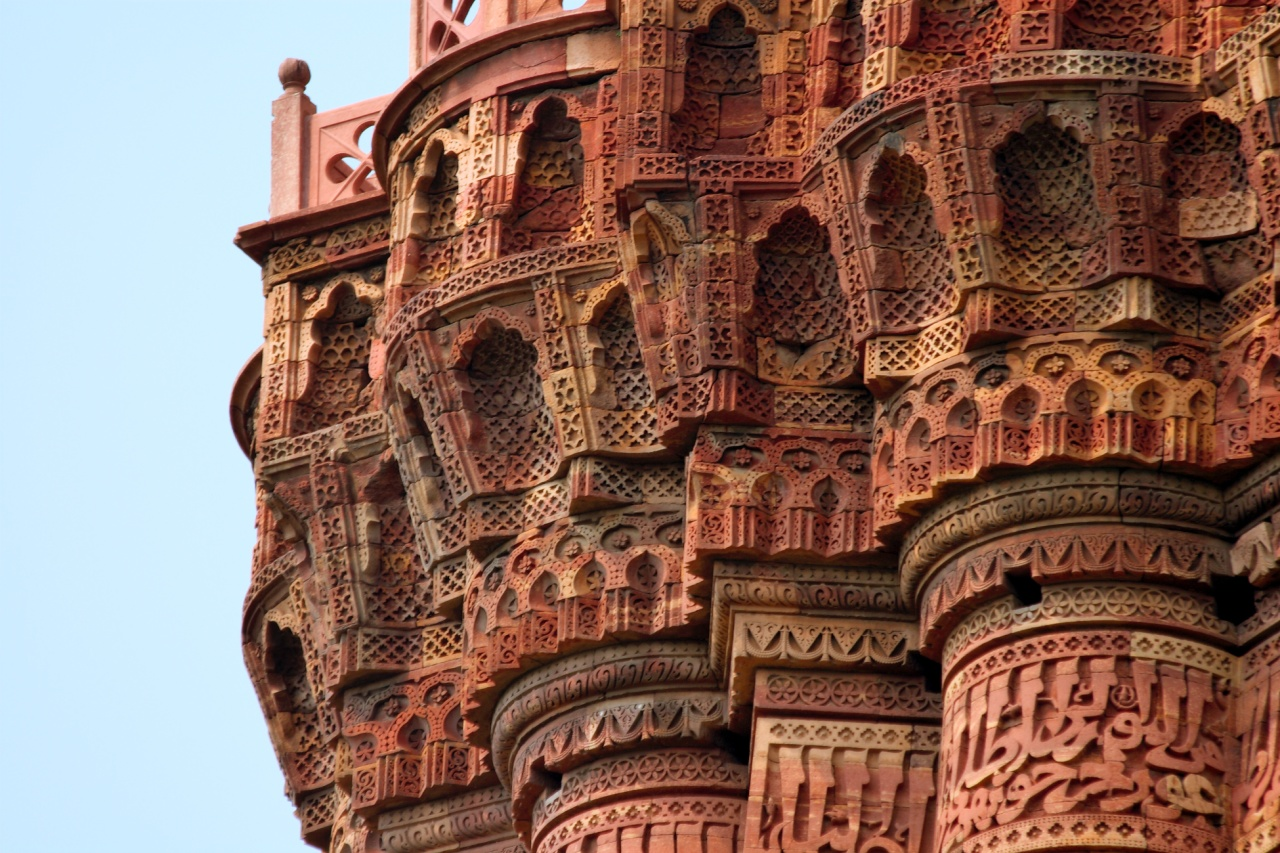
Close-up of balcony

On 14 November 2000, Delhi newspapers reported that the Hindu nationalist groups, Vishva Hindu Parishad and Bajrang Dal, planned to conduct a yajna, a ritualistic Hindu ceremony related to cleansing or purification, at the Qutb Minar complex where the minaret is located. Delhi Police detained 80 people led by Ram Krishan Gaur who congregated near the Qutb Minar and were stopped from performing the yajna inside the tower. Due to a police barricade, the activists instead performed the ritual on the streets outside the mosque complex. Since the spolia of Jain and Hindu temples were used to construct the minaret, the right-wing Hindu groups claimed that they needed to perform a cleansing at the complex in order to "free" the Hindu icons that were "trapped" in the minaret and the mosque complex.

On 18 May 2022, a former Regional Director of the Archaeological Survey of India, Dharamveer Sharma, claimed that Qutb Minar was built by Raja Vikramaditya in the fifth century to observe the changing position of the sun, without substantiating his assertion.

On 21 May 2022, the Secretary at the Ministry of Culture, Govind Mohan, decided to conduct excavation and iconography of idols found at Qutb Minar. The Ministry has asked the ASI to submit an excavation report. Excavation can be started in the south of the minaret at a distance of 15 meters from the mosque.

== Accidents ==
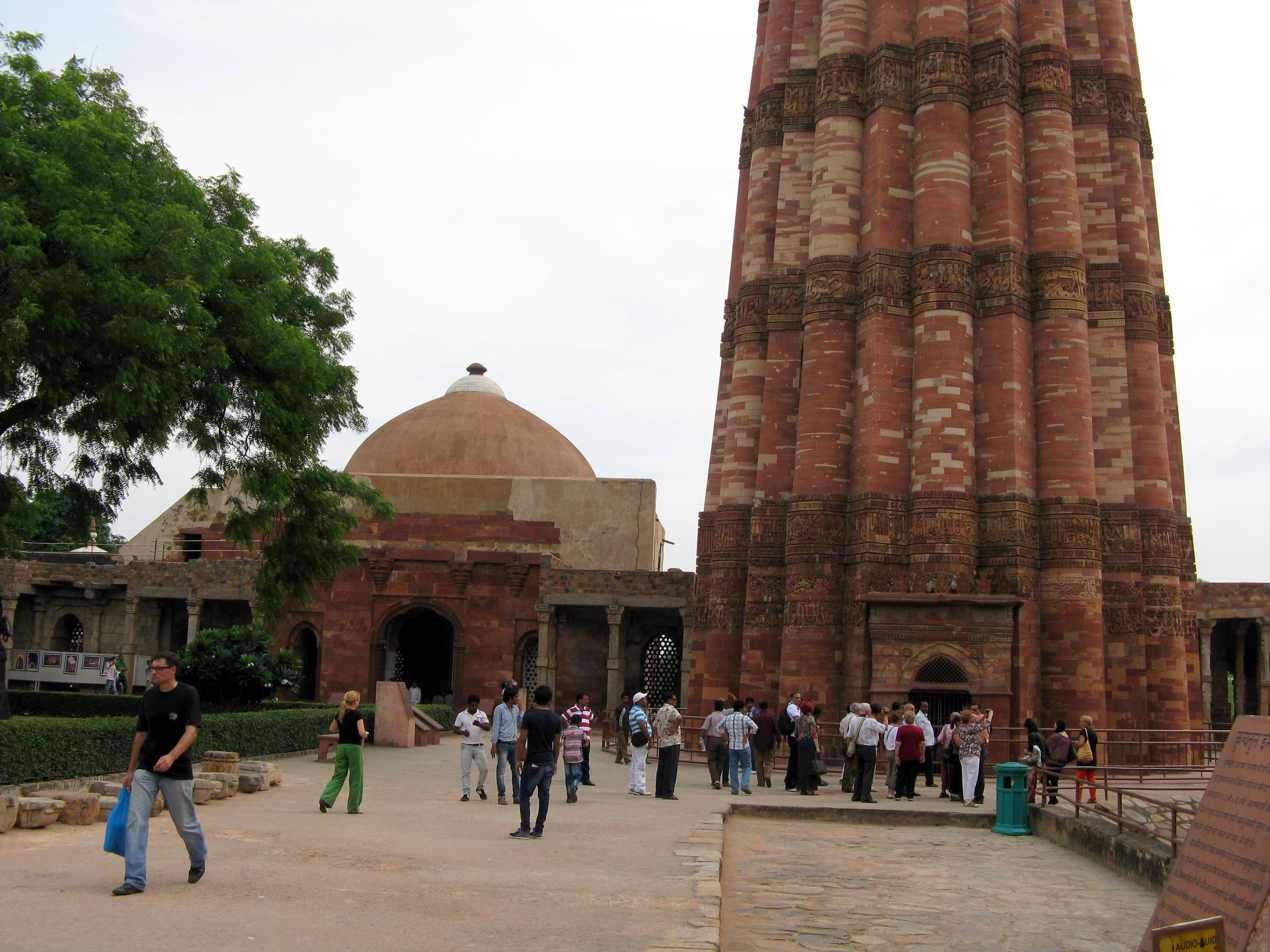
Entrance to Minar

On 8 December 1946 Tara Devi, a Czech actress and the sixth wife of Maharaja Jagatjit Singh, fell from the tower to her death with her two Pomeranian dogs.

Before 1976, the general public was allowed access to the first floor of the minaret, via the internal staircase. Access to the top ceased after 2000 due to suicides.

On 4 December 1981, the staircase lighting failed. Between 300 and 400 visitors stampeded towards the exit. 45 were killed and some were injured. Most of these were school children. Since then, the tower has been closed to the public. This incident triggered the imposition of stringent rules regarding entry.

== Lighting ==
Qutab Minar Illuminated at Night

In recent years, the Qutb Minar has been illuminated for special occasions involving international relations. In September 2023, the monument was lit up in the colours of the Mexican flag to commemorate Mexico's 213th Independence Day, an event that was acknowledged and appreciated by the Embassy of Mexico in India. Similarly, on October 30, the Qutb Minar was illuminated with the Turkish flag to commemorate the 100th anniversary of the Republic of Turkey, an occasion that received special attention from the Turkish Embassy in New Delhi.

== In literature ==
Letitia Elizabeth Landon's poem, The Cootub Minar, Delhi. is a reflection on a picture by Samuel Prout in Fisher's Drawing Room Scrap Book, 1833.

In the 1960 comic book Tintin in Tibet, the main character Tintin and his friend Captain Haddock visit the Qutab Minar, commenting that it is 238 feet high.

== In popular culture ==
- 1943: Qutb Minar was mentioned in the movie Kismet in the song Aaj Himalay Ki Choti Se, a patriotic song.
- 1963: Bollywood actor and director Dev Anand wanted to shoot the song "Dil Ka Bhanwar Kare Pukar" from his film Tere Ghar Ke Samne inside the Minar. However, the cameras of that period were too big to fit inside the tower's narrow passage, and therefore the song was shot inside a replica of the Qutb Minar.
- 2012: The site served as the pit stop of the second leg of the second series of The Amazing Race Australia.
- 2013: A picture of the minaret is featured on the travel cards and tokens issued by the Delhi Metro Rail Corporation. A recently launched start-up in collaboration with the Archaeological Survey of India has made a 360^{o} walkthrough of Qutb Minar available.
- 2017: The Ministry of Tourism recently gave seven companies the 'Letters of Intent' for fourteen monuments under its 'Adopt a Heritage Scheme.' Qutb Minar has been chosen to part of that list.

== Gallery ==
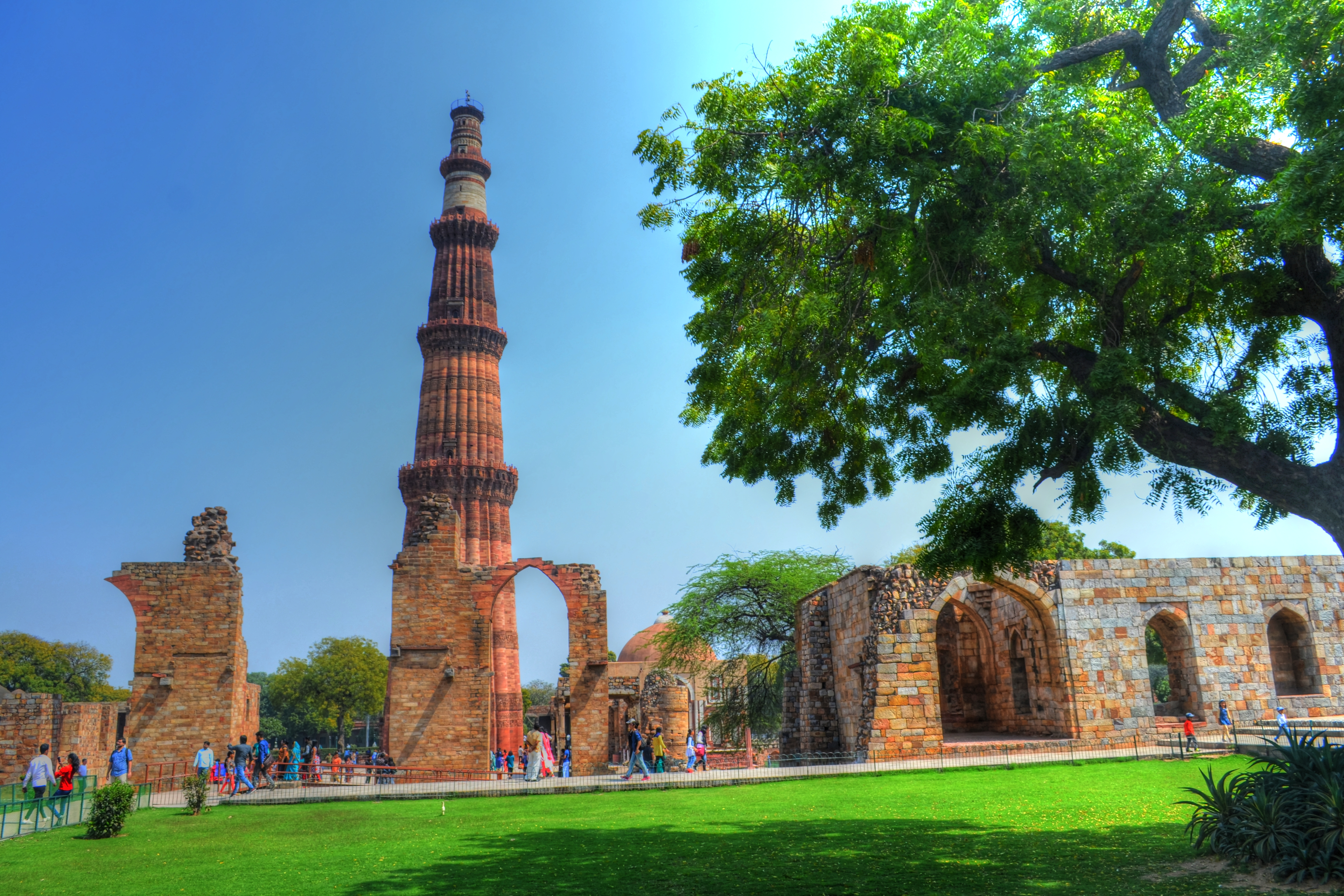
Qutb Minar

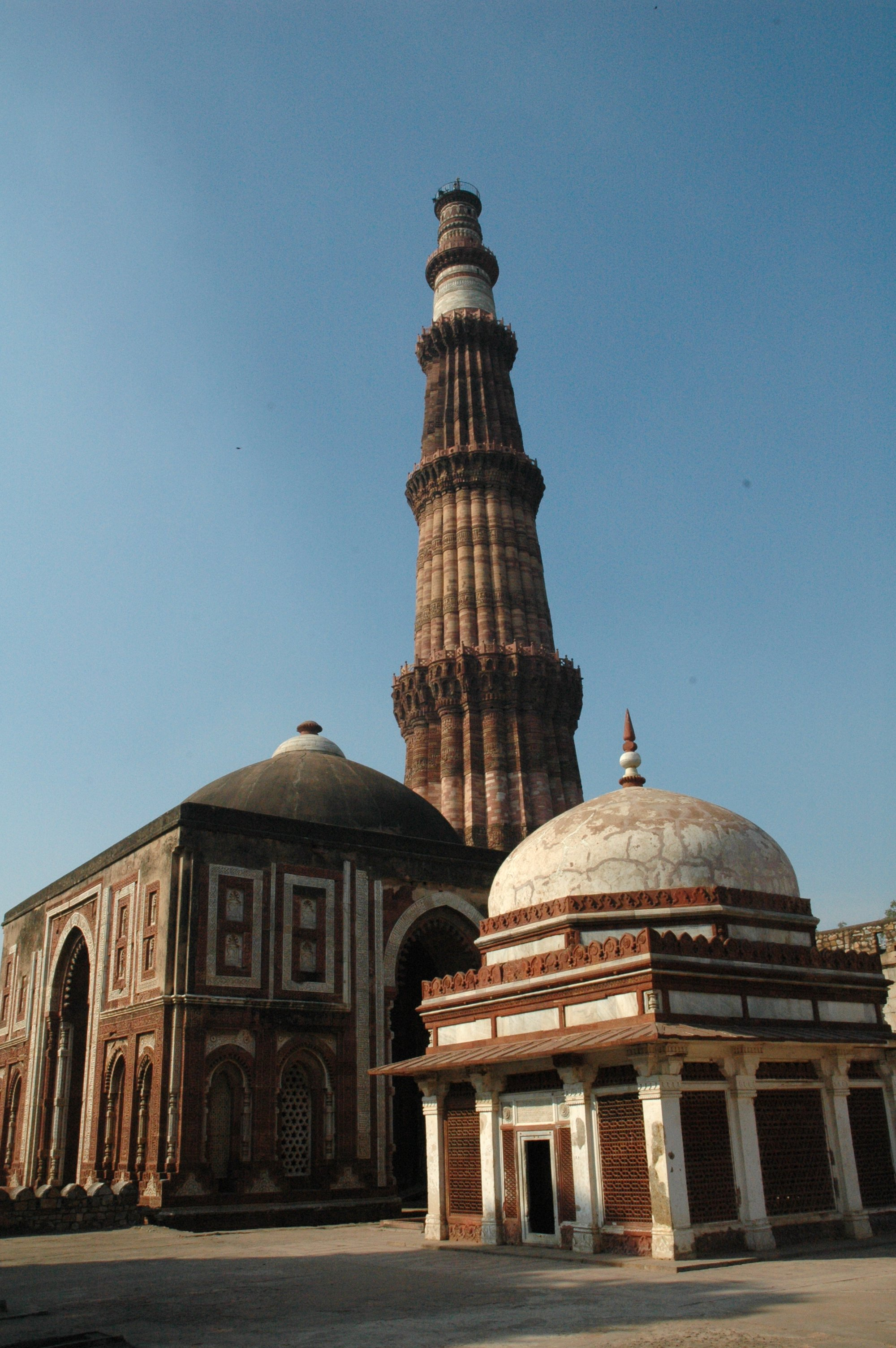
Left to Right:Alai Darwaza, Qutb Minar, Imam Zamin's tomb

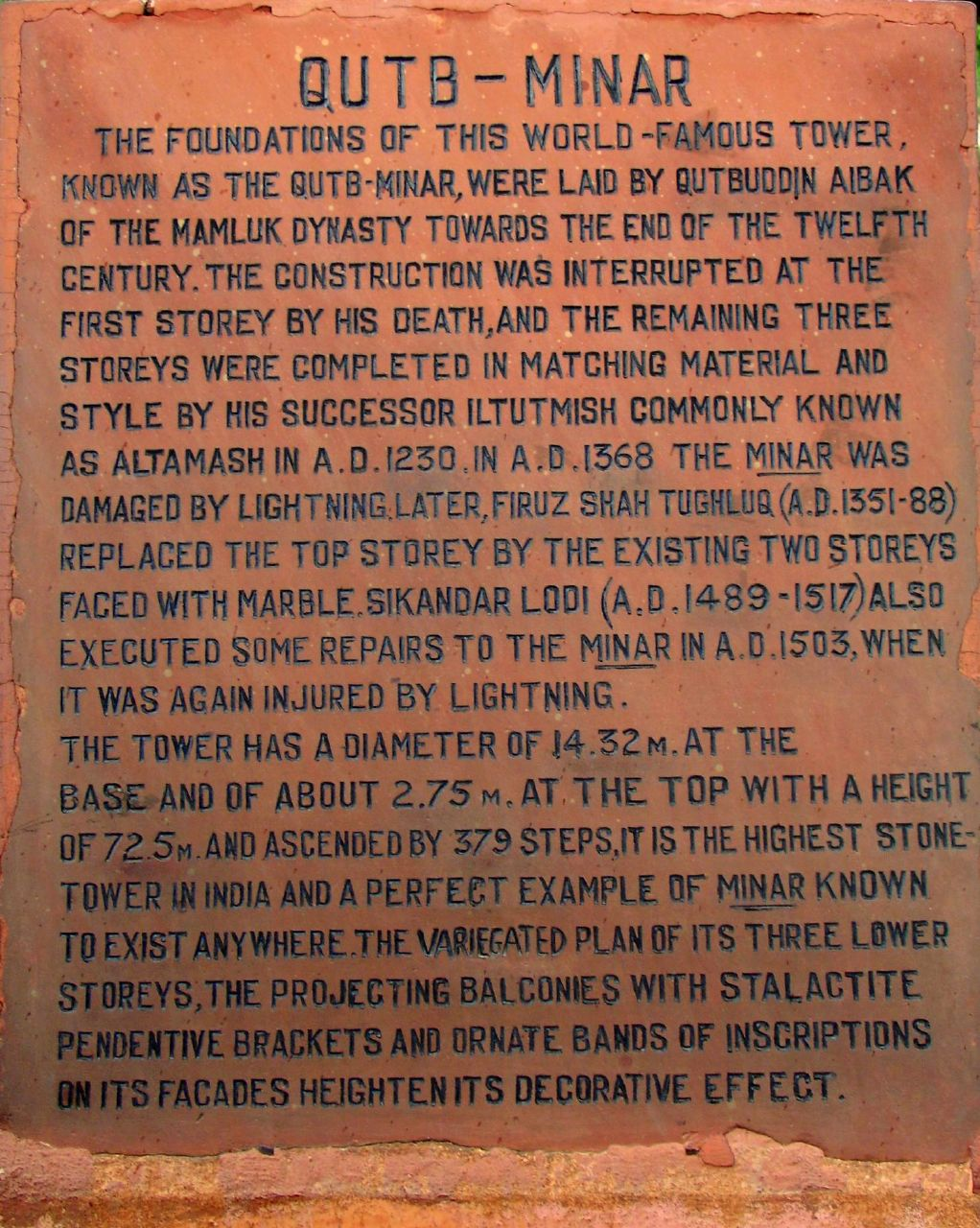
Plaque at Minar

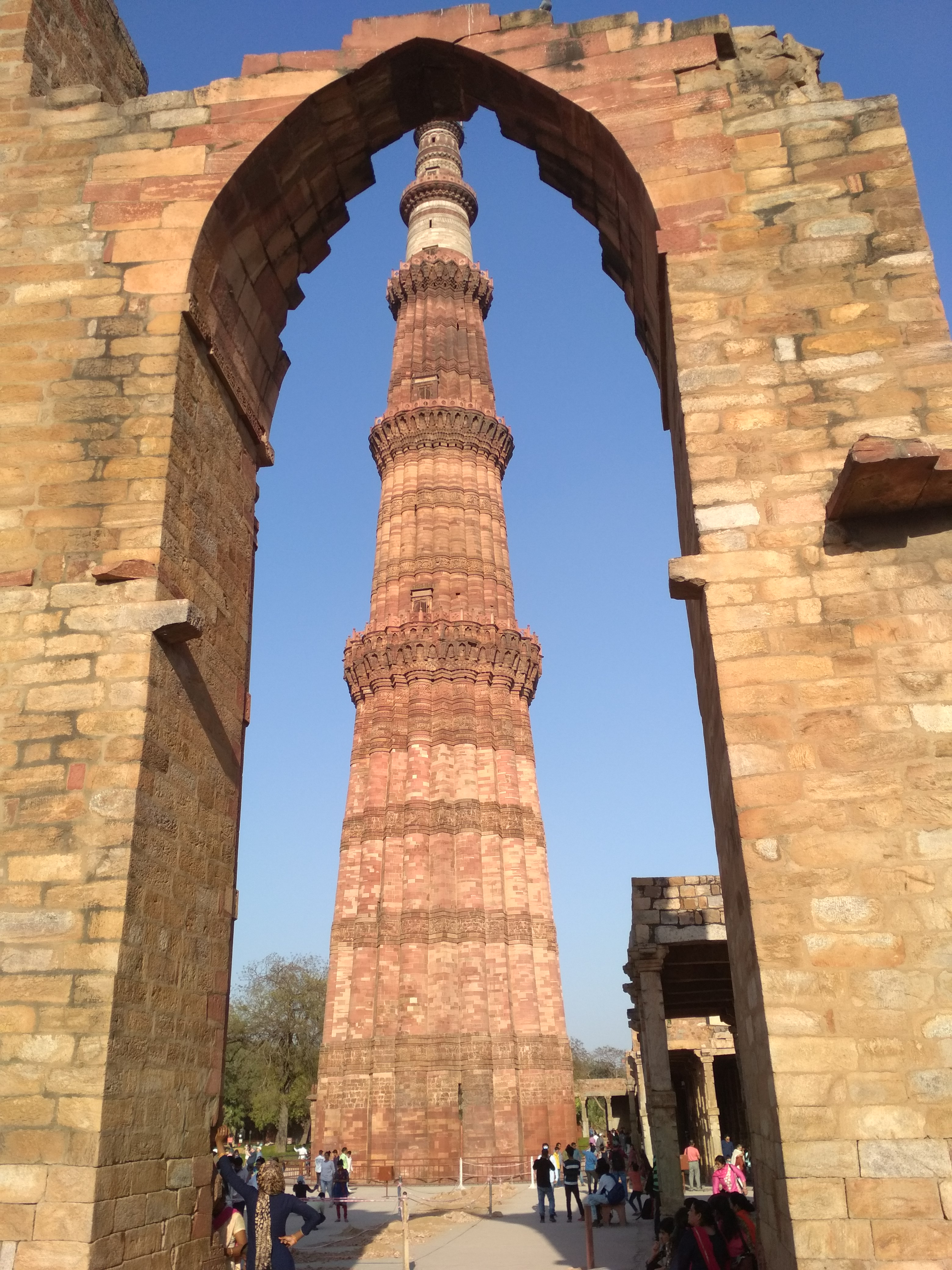
View through arch

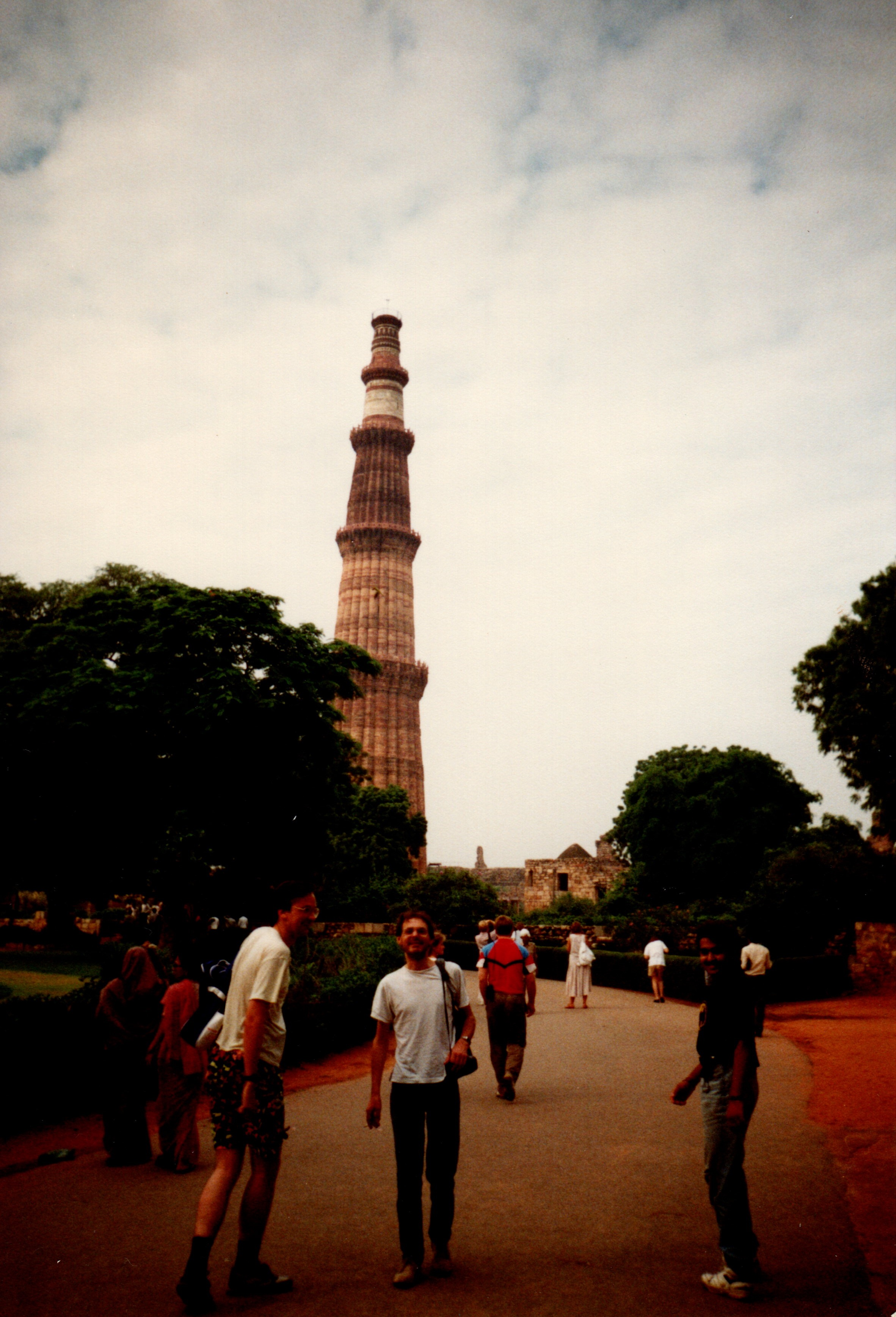
Qutb Minar path view

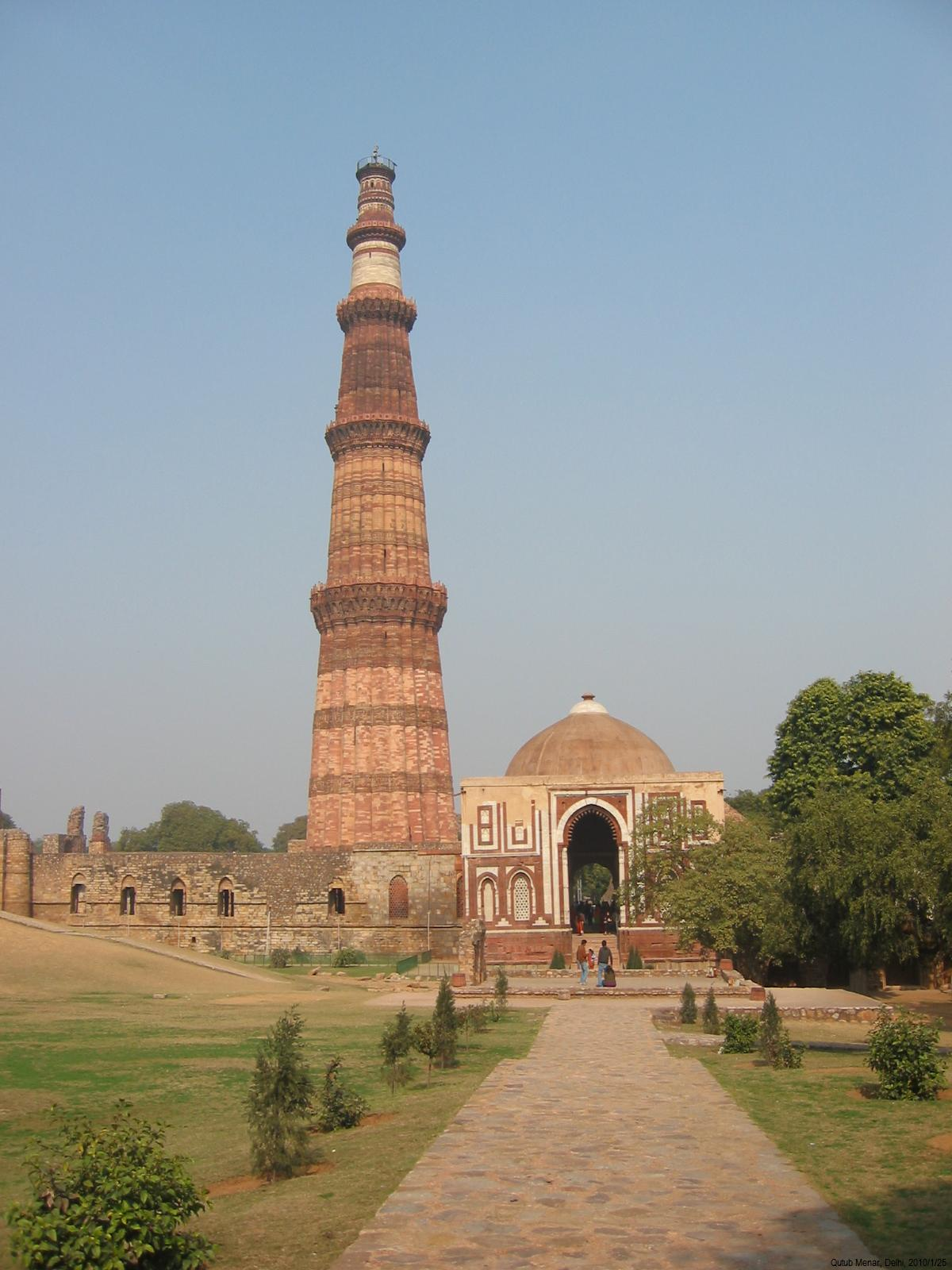
Qutb Minar from the south

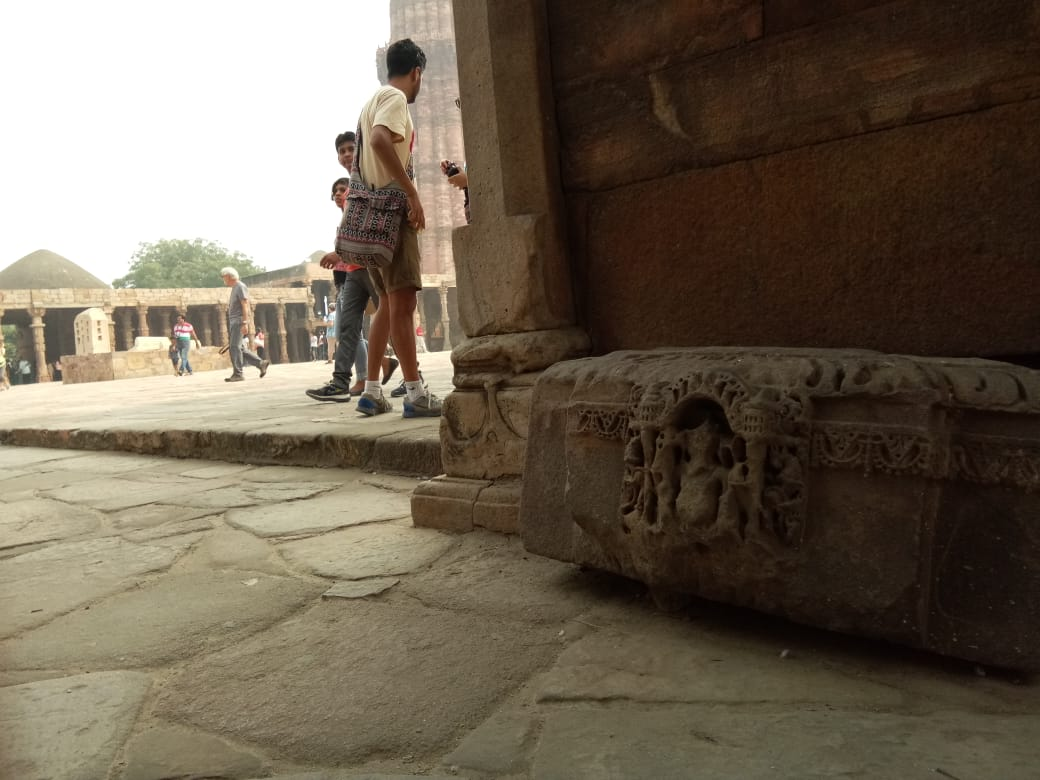
Ganesha's stone relief

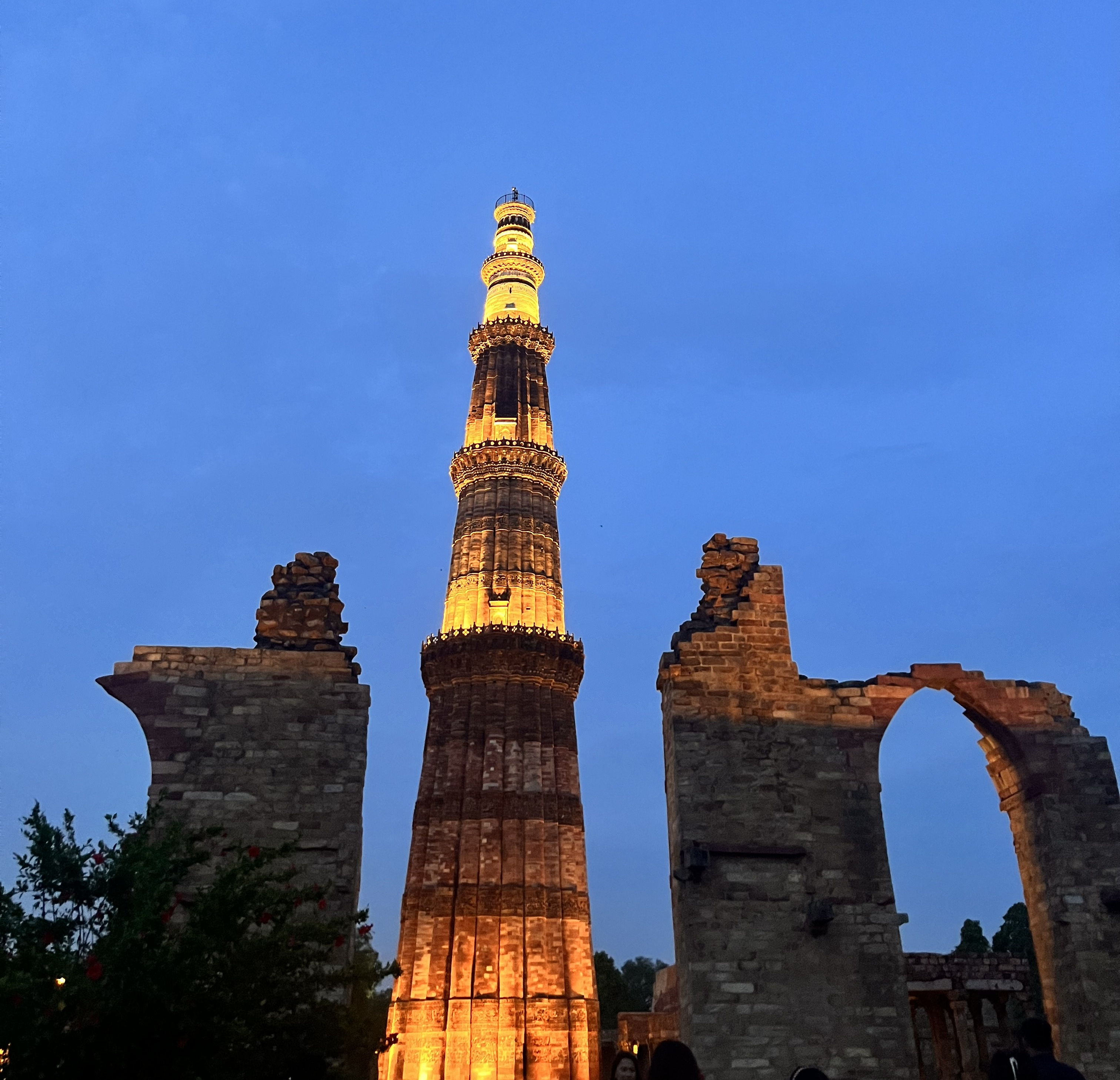
Qutb Minar illuminated at night

== See also ==
- Qutb
- Ghazni Minarets
- Firoz Minar
- Fateh Burj
- List of tallest minarets
- List of tallest structures built before the 20th century
