= Kavi Pradeep =

Indian singer (1915–1998)

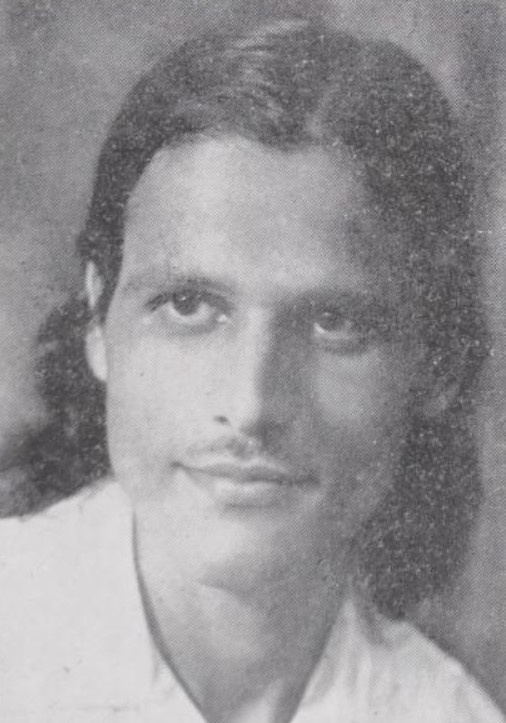
- Pradeep in 1942
- Born: Ramchandra Narayanji Dwivedi; 6 February 1915; Badnagar, Central India Agency, British India (present-day Madhya Pradesh, India)
- Died: 11 December 1998 (aged 83); Mumbai, Maharashtra, India
- Other name: Rashtrakavi
- Occupation: Poet
- Years active: 1939–1997
- Awards: Sangeet Natak Akademi Award (1961); Dadasaheb Phalke Award (1997)

Kavi Pradeep (born Ramchandra Narayanji Dwivedi; 6 February 1915 – 11 December 1998), was an Indian poet and songwriter who is best known for his patriotic song "Aye Mere Watan Ke Logo" written as a tribute to the soldiers who had died defending the country during the Sino-Indian War.

His first recognition came for his patriotic lyrics for the film Bandhan (1940). His status as a nationalistic writer got immortalised for writing a daringly patriotic song "Door Hato Ae Duniya Walo" (Move Away O Outsiders) in India's first golden jubilee hit Kismet (1943) because he was forced to go underground to avoid arrest immediately after the film's release that invited the ire of British government.

In a career span of five decades, Kavi Pradeep wrote about 1,700 songs and nationalistic poems including the lyrics for some 72 films, including hits like "Chal Chal Re Naujawan" in film Bandhan (1940) and "Aao Bachcho Tumhein Dikhayen" and "De Dee Hame Azaadi" in the film Jagriti (1954) In 1958, His Master's Voice, released an album of 13 songs with his lyrics. He was made the Rashtrakavi (National Poet), and came to be known as, Kavi Pradeep.

In 1997, he was honoured with India's highest award in cinema, the Dada Saheb Phalke Award, for lifetime achievement.

== Biography ==
=== Early life ===
Kavi Pradeep was born Ramchandra Narayanji Dwivedi in 1915 into a middle-class Audichya Brahmin family in the small central Indian town of Badnagar near Ujjain. Since his early student days and later while pursuing graduation from University of Lucknow, he had a passion for writing and rendering Hindi poetry. Shri Girija Shankar Dixit, a local genius poet from Unnao District in Uttar Pradesh, was his first teacher who mentored his poetry skills( Girija Shankar Dixit was the eldest son of renowned poet Shri Balbhadra Prasad Dixit). He hypnotised the audience at kavi sammelans (poet's gatherings) with his inimitable style. It was during this time he adopted the pen name ("nom de plume") Pradeep. After graduating from Lucknow University in 1939, he decided to join a teacher's course to become a teacher.

=== Early career ===
Pradeep was invited to a Kavi Sammelan in Bombay where he was offered his first film Kangan (1939), by Himanshu Rai of Bombay Talkies. The film starred Leela Chitnis and Ashok Kumar. Pradeep shifted to Bombay and wrote four songs for the film, all of which became very popular, and sung three of the songs himself.

He next film was Bandhan (1940) produced by S. Mukherjee and directed by Gyan Mukherjee. The music director was Saraswati Devi. This time he wrote all the songs which became huge hits. The most notable is "Chal Chal Re Naujawan", which made waves since the Indian freedom movement was at a crucial juncture.

=== Golden era ===
He worked on five more movies for Bombay Talkies which included Punar Milan (1940), Jhoola (1941), Naya Sansar (1941), Anjan (1943) and Kismet (1943). Kismet is known for its patriotic song "Aaj Himalay Ki Choti Se (Phir Hum Ne Lalkara Hai, Door Hato Ae Duniyawalon Hindustan Hamara Hai)" (From the peak of the Himalayas we are warning other countries to stay away from India as it is our country).

Mashaal (1950) was his next film and it features the extremely popular song "Upar Gagan Vishal" sung by Manna Dey. Kavi Pradeep was at his creative zenith when he wrote for the films Nastik (1954) and Jagriti (1954). He even lent his voice for the evergreen song "Dekh Tere Sansar Ki Halat Kya Ho Gayi Bhagwaan, Kitna Badal Gaya Insaan" (Look at your world, O God. How the man has changed!) from the film Nastik (1954). Jagriti is considered to be among his best work for one movie as it includes hit songs such as "Aao Bachcho Tumhein Dikhayen Jhanki Hindustan Ki, Is Mitti Se Tilak Karo, Yeh Dharti Hai Balidan Ki" (sung by himself), "Hum Laye Hain Toofan Se Kishti Nikal Ke, Is Desh Ko Rakhna Mere Bachcho Sambhal Ke" and "De Dee Humein Azadi (Bina Khadag Bina Dhal, Sabarmati Ke Sant Tu Ne Kar Diya Kamaal)". His devotional song from the superhit film Waman Avtar (1955) starring Trilok Kapoor and Nirupa Roy “Tere Dwar khada Bhagwan” is popular till today.

His songs were so popular that fans would see his movies repeatedly just to listen to his soulful songs. Kavi Pradeep always believed in writing songs in simple words portraying a meaning fitting into the situation. The popularity of his songs was due to his down-to-earth lyrics and simple language that was well understood by everyone.

=== Later life ===
By the 1960s, the popularity of his songs was on the wane and film producers who were looking for western music and fast numbers avoided him. However he managed to prove his detractors wrong with films Talaaq, a Rajendra Kumar starrer and Paigam (1959) starring Dilip Kumar, Raaj Kumar and Vyjayantimala. With "Insaan Ka Insaan Se Ho Bhaichara, Yahi Paigam Hamara" being a highlight. S. Mukerji's Sambandh (1969) starring Pradeep Kumar was a movie that ran on the popularity of songs such as "Chal Akela Chal Akela, Tera Mela Peechhe Chhoota Raahi Chal Akela", "Jo Diya Tha Tum Ne Ek Din, Mujhe Phir Wohi Pyar De Do, Ek Karz Mangta Hoon, Bachpan Udhar De Do" were written by Kavi Pradeep. He continued to show his brilliance in 1975, when the movie Jai Santoshi Maa was released. For a low-budget movie, it matched the collections of another blockbuster Sholay. For months, theatres screening the movie, held the housefull boards high. Ladies would perform poojas when the immortal song "Main To Aarti Utaroon Re Santoshi Mata Ki" was played in the theatres. He also sang one of the songs "Yahan Wahan" from the film for which he received the award as Best Male Playback Singer from the Bengal Film Journalists' Association in 1975.

== The Patriot ==
Kismet was his groundbreaking effort since it came at the time of the Quit India Movement. The country was in strife with all national leaders in prison. He cleverly wrote the song "Aaj Himalay Ki Choti Se Phir Hum Ne Lalkara Hai". The song was supposed to warn the Axis powers, but the Indian public understood the real meaning of the song. Almost synonymous to the song (phir means again in Hindi), the reel would be rewound and played many times to satisfy public demand. Theatres around the country were resounded with "once more" calls once the song ended. The reel had to be rewound and the song was screened again and again. Kismet made box office history for its time by running for 3½ years in one theatre. Though the song managed to pass through heavy censorship of the time, the British soon realised the true meaning of his songs and issued a warrant for his arrest. This forced Kavi Pradeep to go underground to avoid arrest.

He continued his patriotic zeal with renewed vigour after independence in movies such as Jagriti with a song considered to be his tribute to Mahatma Gandhi, "De Dee Humein Azadi Bina Khadag Bina Dhal." His song for children "Hum laye hain toofan se kishti nikal ke" is still played throughout the country on 14 November, Children's Day. Jagriti was unofficially remade in Pakistan as Bedari (1956), by Rafiq Rizvi, with the Pradeep's songs also being lifted. The songs had Paktistani nationalist symbols replacing Indian ones and such as Muhammad Ali Jinnah in "Aey Qaid-e-Azam, tera ehsan hai ehsan" a reworking "De Di Humein Azaadi", and "Aao Bachho Sair Karain Tum Ko Pakistan Ki" copying from "Aao Bachcho Tumhein Dikhayen (Jhanki Hindustan Ki)".

During 1962 Indo-China war days, he heard about Param Vir Major Shaitan Singh Bhati. He was so touched by his sacrifice and bravery that he penned down the lines "Aye Mere Watan Ke Logo" (O people of my country) which went on to become one of the greatest patriotic songs of the country. For writing the song Kavi Pradeep was conferred the honour of "Rashtriya Kavi" (National Poet) by the government of India. This song was originally supposed to be sung by Asha Bhosle, due to a misunderstanding between composer C. Ramchandra and Lata Mangeshkar. Kavi Pradeep though, was adamant about having Lata Mangeshkar sing the song, as he felt that hers was the only voice that could do justice to the number. C. Ramchandra was unsure whether Mangeshkar would agree to sing, so Kavi Pradeep began the task of convincing her to hear the song. On hearing the song she was moved so much that she instantly agreed to sing the song on condition that Kavi Pradeep be present at the rehearsals.

The song was famously performed live, by Lata Mangeshkar, in the presence of Prime Minister, Jawaharlal Nehru at the National Stadium, New Delhi, on Republic Day celebrations held on 26 January 1963, and moved him to tears, and a copy of the soundtrack spool was also gifted to him on the occasion. Despite many offers, Kavi Pradeep pledged the royalties of the song to 'War Widows Fund' and on 25 August 2005 Bombay High Court ordered His Master's Voice to pay ₹ 1 million as arrears in royalty to the Fund.

In 1987, Pradeep told a journalist, "Nobody can make you patriotic. It's in your blood. It is how you bring it out to serve the country that makes you different."

== Popular songs ==
- "Aye Mere Watan Ke Logo"
- "Aaj Himalay Ki Choti Se"
- "De Dee Hame Azaadi"
- "Aao Bachcho Tumhen Dikhayen (Jagriti)
- "Hum Laye Hain Toofan Se" (Jagriti)
- “Tere Dwar Khada Bhagwan” (Waman Avtar)
- "Aaj Ke Is Insaan Ko Ye Kya Hogaya" (Amar Rahe Yeh Pyar)
- "Kitna Badal Gaya Insaan (Dekh Tere Sansar Ki Haalat)" (Nastik)
- “Pinjare ka Panchi” ( Naag Mani)
- "Chal Akela Chal Akela (Samandh)
- "Aao baccho tumhe dikhaye jhanki Hindustan ki"

== Awards ==
Kavi Pradeep received numerous awards throughout his life. Some of which are:

- Sangeet Natak Akademi Award – 1961
- Bengal Film Journalists' Association Award for Best Male Playback – Jai Santoshi Maa (1975)
- Dadasaheb Phalke Award – 1997

== Legacy ==
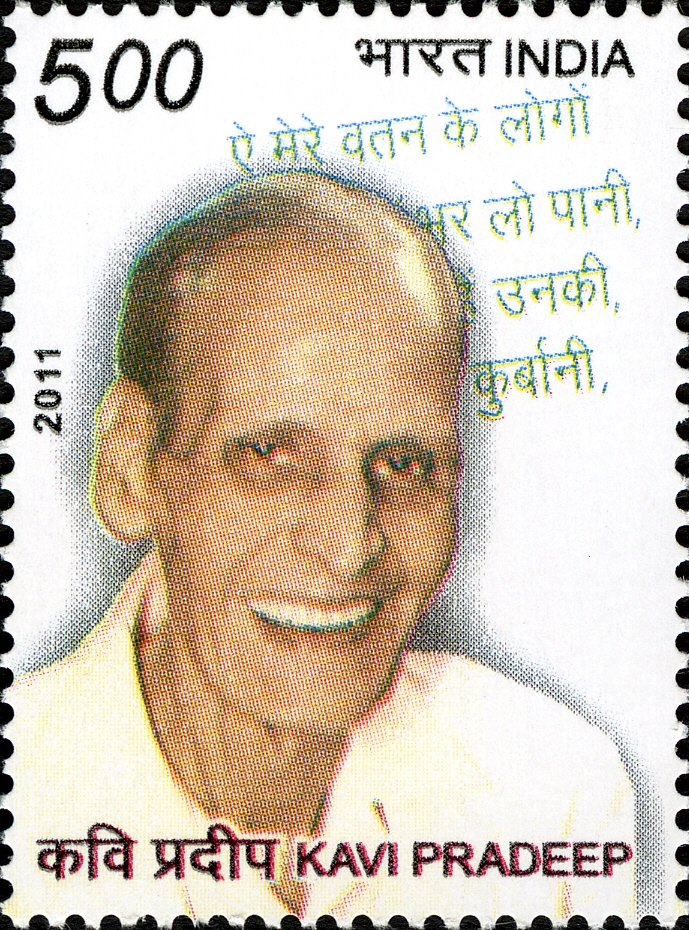
Kavi Pradeep on 2011 stamp of India

About the kind of songs he wrote, Pradeep once said, "Love is just a part of life and the love written about today talks about love between the sexes only. But do young men and women have a monopoly where love is concerned. Aren't there different kinds of love that between a mother and her children, between a father and his children, between a bhakt (devotee) and his deity, between a man and his motherland? I chose to write about all these different kinds of love."

He stayed in the Irla area of the Mumbai suburb of Vile Parle until he died at the age of 83 in Mumbai on 11 December 1998. He was survived by his wife and two daughters, Sargam Thaker and Mitul Pradeep, who later set up the Kavi Pradeep Foundation. An award, Kavi Pradeep Samman, has also been constituted in his memory.
