= List of awards and nominations received by Ashok Kumar =

Ashok Kumar awards and nominations
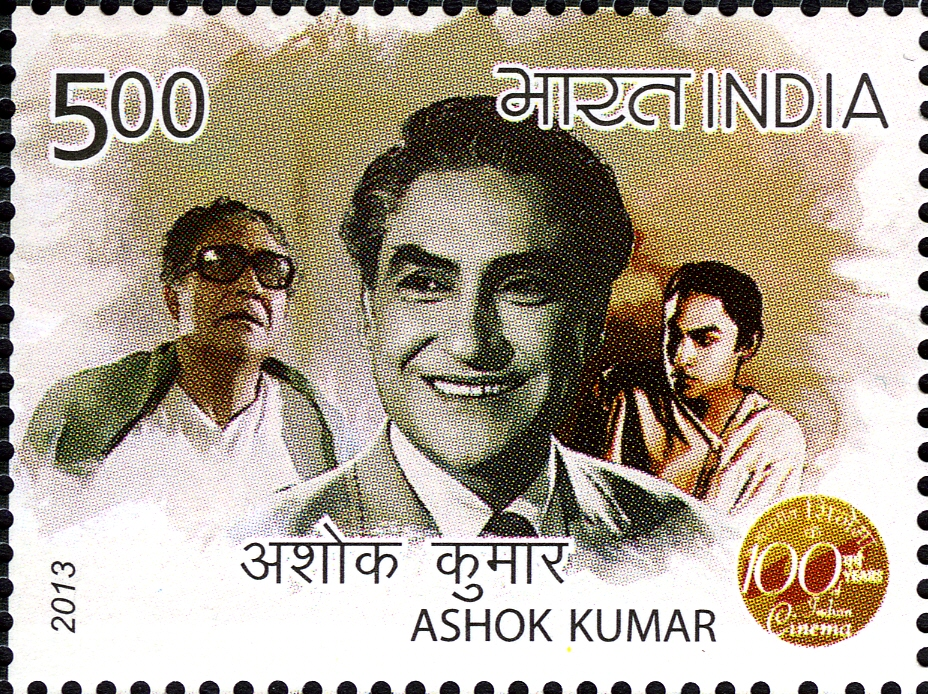
- Kumar on a 2013 stamp of India
Awards and nominations
Award	Wins	Nominations
Filmfare Awards	4	9
National Film Awards	3	3

Totals (Note: Certain award groups do not simply award one winner. They acknowledge several different recipients, have runners-up, and have third place. Since this is a specific recognition and is different from losing an award, runner-up mentions are considered wins in this award tally. For simplification and to avoid errors, each award in this list has been presumed to have had a prior nomination.)
- Wins: 15
- Nominations: 21

Ashok Kumar (born Kumudlal Ganguly; 13 October 1911 – 10 December 2001), was an Indian actor who attained iconic status in Indian cinema. He was considered the first big star of Indian cinema and was the first lead actor to play an anti-hero. He also became the first star to reinvent himself, enjoying a long and hugely successful career as a character actor.

== Civilian Awards ==
Year	Award	Work	Result	Ref.
1962	Padma Shri	Contribution in the field of Arts	Honoured	
1999	Padma Bhushan	Contribution in the field of Arts	Honoured	

== National Film Awards ==
Year	Award	Category	Work	Result	Ref.
1968	16th National Film Awards	Best Actor	Aashirwad	Won	
1975	23rd National Film Awards	Best Feature Film	Chomana Dudi	Won	
1988	Dadasaheb Phalke Award	Outstanding Contribution to Indian Cinema	—N/a	Honoured	

== Filmfare Awards ==
Year	Award	Category	Work	Result	Ref.
1962	10th Filmfare Awards	Best Actor	Rakhi	Won	
1963	11th Filmfare Awards	Best Actor	Gumrah	Nominated	
1963	11th Filmfare Awards	Best Supporting Actor	Gumrah	Nominated	
1966	14th Filmfare Awards	Best Supporting Actor	Afsana	Won	
1967	15th Filmfare Awards	Best Supporting Actor	Mehrban	Nominated	
1969	17th Filmfare Awards	Best Actor	Aashirwad	Won	
1969	17th Filmfare Awards	Best Supporting Actor	Aashirwad	Nominated	
1976	23rd Filmfare Awards	Best Supporting Actor	Chhoti Si Baat	Nominated	
1996	41st Filmfare Awards	Lifetime Achievement Award	—N/a	Honoured	

== Bengal Film Journalists' Association Awards ==
Winner:

- 1963 – Best Actor (Hindi) for Gumrah
- 1969 – Best Actor (Hindi) for Aashirwad

== Screen Awards ==
- 1993 – Screen Lifetime Achievement Award

== National honours ==
- 1959 – Sangeet Natak Akademi Award in Acting
- 2001 – Awadh Samman by the Government of Uttar Pradesh

== See also ==
- Ashok Kumar filmography
- Bombay Talkies
- Ganguly family
