= Jagriti =

- Directed by: Satyen Bose
- Written by: Manoranjan Ghose; Pandit Urmil
- Screenplay by: Satyen Bose
- Story by: Manoranjan Ghose
- Produced by: S. Mukherjee
- Starring: Abhi Bhattacharya; Ratan Kumar; Rajkumar Gupta; Pranoti Ghosh; Bipin Gupta; Mumtaz Begum
- Cinematography: N. V. Srinivas
- Edited by: D. V. Pai
- Music by: Hemant Kumar
- Production company: Filmistan Ltd.
- Distributed by: Filmistan Ltd.
- Release date: 1954
- Country: India
- Language: Hindi

Jagriti (transl. The Awakening) is a 1954 Indian Hindi-language film directed by Satyen Bose. A remake of Bose's 1949 Bengali film Paribartan, the film stars Rajkumar Gupta, Abhi Bhattacharya, and Ratan Kumar in the lead roles. The film won the Filmfare Award for Best Film at the 3rd Filmfare Awards in 1956. Bhattacharya received the Filmfare Award for Best Supporting Actor for his outstanding performance in Jagriti at the same ceremony. Jagriti still considered one of the best children-centric films of India.

The film was screened retrospectively on 14 August 2016 at the Independence Day Film Festival jointly presented by the Indian Directorate of Film Festivals and Ministry of Defense, commemorating the 70th Indian Independence Day.

== Plot ==
The film is about a spoiled rich kid, Ajay (Rajkumar Gupta), who is sent away to a boarding school by his uncle. In the hostel, Ajay meets mischievous boys like him. They have a superintendent called "King Kong". Ajay then meets Shakti, a poor boy with a missing leg. Ajay befriends him.

The days pass and the naughtiness of the boys is only increasing day by day. One day, a man named Shekhar becomes the new superintendent. He is a calm man who hardly loses his temper.

When the results of an exam are out, most students fail. Shekhar then introduces a new scheme of learning where the children are given leniency. All the boys listen to Shekhar, barring Ajay. He starts doing the opposite of whatever Shekhar tells. Shakti tries his best to change him.

One Day, Ajay kicks a boy in the stomach while playing a football match. Seeing this, Shekhar becomes furious, and tells everyone to boycott Ajay and suspends him. Hurt, Ajay decides to leave the hostel and run away. Shakti tries to persuade him to not leave. He starts going after Ajay on the road to stop him. A car hits Shakti and he is taken to the hospital. Later, Shakti passes away and Ajay realises that his stubbornness was the cause of Shakti's death.

Many months later, Ajay is a changed boy who stands first in class thereby fulfilling his promise to Shekhar and Shakti. Shekhar decides to leave the hostel and go. He regrets boycotting Ajay and leaves. The film ends in a song sung by Shekhar as he leaves.

== Cast ==
- Abhi Bhattacharya as Shekhar
- Pranoti Ghosh
- Bipin Gupta
- Mumtaz Begum
- Rajkumar Gupta as Ajay
- Suresh Bhindora as Shakti
- Chandan Kumar
- Dilip
- Raja
- Mohan Choti
- Ghanshyam
- Navneet
- Girish
- Padmakar (as Padmaker)
- Nanda

== Soundtrack ==
This movie is known for its classic patriotic songs, written by one of the greatest Indian poets and lyricists of all time, Kavi Pradeep, and set to music by Hemant Kumar.

Song	Singer
"Aao Bachchon Tumhe Dikhaye"	Kavi Pradeep
"Chalo Chale Maa" (Happy)	Asha Bhosle
"Chalo Chale Maa" (Sad)	Asha Bhosle
"Sabarmati Ke Sant Tune"	Asha Bhosle
"Hum Laye Hain Toofan Se"	Mohammed Rafi

== Awards ==
Filmfare Award for Best Movie

- National Film Awards
  - 1954 - National Film Award for Best Feature Film in Hindi - Certificate of Merit

== Remake ==
The Pakistani film Bedari had an identical plot and the songs, with replacement of some words, and music taken directly from Jagriti. Ratan Kumar (Syed Nazir Ali), who had moved to Pakistan with his family, acted in Bedari also. When Bedari was released in Pakistan in 1956, it too made fabulous business in the first few weeks of exhibition. However, it dawned upon the Pakistani cinemagoers that they were watching a plagiarized film. There was a mass uproar that caused public demonstrations against exhibition of the plagiarized film. The Censor Board of Pakistan immediately put a ban on this film.
