= Aye Mere Watan Ke Logo =

Patriotic Indian song

Song by Lata Mangeshkar
- Language: Hindi
- English title: O' people of my country
- Written: Pradeep
- Released: 27 January 1963
- Venue: National Stadium, New Delhi
- Genre: Patriotic song
- Label: Saregama
- Composer: C. Ramchandra
- Lyricist: Kavi Pradeep

"Aye Mere Watan Ke Logo" (lit. "O' people of my country") is a patriotic song written in Hindi by Kavi Pradeep, composed by C. Ramchandra, and sung by singer Lata Mangeshkar. The song commemorates Indian soldiers who were killed in action during the Sino-Indian War in 1962.

The song was first performed live two months after the war by Mangeshkar on Republic Day (26 January) 1963 at the National Stadium in New Delhi in the presence of President Sarvepalli Radhakrishnan and Prime Minister Jawaharlal Nehru.

The song is often performed at public events and gatherings in India and is considered to be one of the most popular patriotic songs alongside "Jana Gana Mana" (the national anthem), "Vande Mataram" (the national song), and "Sare Jahan Se Accha".

== Writing and composition ==
"Aye Mere Watan Ke Logo" was written by Kavi Pradeep to commemorate the Indian soldiers who died during the Sino-Indian War. Pradeep was deeply moved by the casualties of war. In late 1962, while taking a walk along Mahim beach in Mumbai, Pradeep became inspired. He borrowed a pen from another walker and wrote the opening stanza of the song on a piece of foil that he ripped out from his cigarette pack. A few weeks later, Pradeep was approached by producer Mehboob Khan to write a song for a fundraiser scheduled to be held at the National Stadium in New Delhi. Pradeep accepted the offer but did not reveal any details of the song he planned to write. He recruited music director C. Ramchandra to write the music and asked Lata Mangeshkar to sing the song. According to Pradeep's daughter, Mitul, due to some misunderstanding between Ramchandra and Lata, Asha Bhosle was chosen as the singer by the music director. However, Pradeep felt no one other than Mangeshkar could do justice to it and so he personally convinced her to sing it. Mangeshkar agreed on the condition that Pradeep was present during rehearsals.

Mangeshkar suggested converting the song's format from solo to a duet with herself and Asha as singers. While Pradeep preferred for it to remain a solo piece. Asha rehearsed for the song but shortly before they were to fly to Delhi, Asha decided to pull out of the event. Lata Mangeshkar tried to convince her otherwise, as her name was already associated with the event, the details of which were printed in newspapers. The great Composer-singer Hemant Kumar who managed the whole project also tried hard to convince Asha, but couldn't. So, Lata Mangeshkar had to sing it alone.

== First performance ==
In January 2013, Lata Mangeshkar said in an interview that she had initially refused the opportunity to sing this song, as she didn't have enough rehearsal time. "It was Pradeepji, (Kavi Pradeep) the poet, who wrote the immortal lyrics, who came to me and asked me to sing the song. I declined because there was no time to rehearse. You see, at that time I was working round-the-clock. To give special attention to one song seemed impossible. But Pradeepji insisted, Lata said, admitting that she was very nervous before the performance. My regret is that Pradeepji had not been called for the Republic Day function where I sang the song. If he had been there, he would have seen with his own eyes what impact 'Aye Mere Watan Ke Logo' had," Lata said.

The first live performance by Lata Mangeshkar of the song was on 26 January 1963 and was held at an event at the National Stadium in New Delhi. President S. Radhakrishnan and Prime Minister Jawaharlal Nehru attended the performance because Republic Day (26 January) 1963, which was just two months after the end of the war. The performance of the song moved Nehru to tears. "Those who don't feel inspired by Aye mere watan ke logo don't deserve to be called a Hindustani", said Nehru, who was visibly moved by the song. He called Lata Mangeshkar from back stage and personally said to her, "my child, you made me weep today." There was a tea party in the evening at his house. He personally invited her saying, "Please come today to my evening tea-party." He was so moved by the song, that immediately after telling this to Lata, he left the place.

The event raised ₹2 lakh (equivalent to ₹1.7 crore or US$170,000 in 2023) for the Army Welfare Fund. The song's lyricist, Pradeep, was not invited to the performance. Pradeep performed the song for Nehru on 21 March 1963 at a function at R.M. High School in Mumbai. He also presented Nehru with the original handwritten lyrics of the song.

The song received rave appreciation from across the country.

== Reception and legacy ==
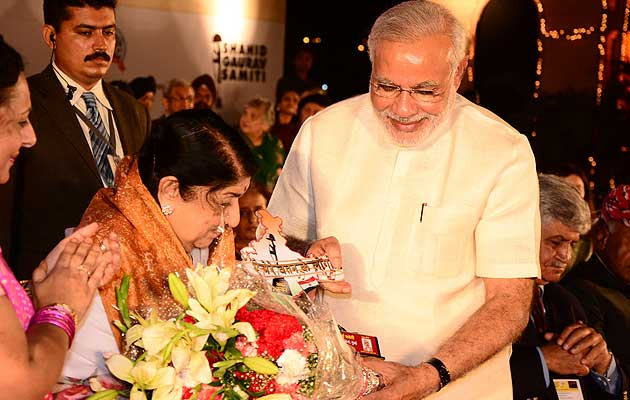
Mangeshkar at the 51st anniversary of "Aye Mere Watan Ke Logon" in 2014

All of the artists and technicians involved with the song including singers, musicians, music director, lyricist, recording studio, sound recordist pledged the royalties from the song in perpetuity to the War Widows Fund. Per Pradeep's last wishes, royalties for sale of records of the song were to be donated to war widows. In 2005, the Bombay High Court asked the music company His Master's Voice to indicate a lump sum payable to the Army Welfare Fund for the disabled and war widows from the song's royalty proceeds.

Brigadier Chitranjan Sawant, who served in the Sino-Indian War, stated that the song inspired soldiers to withstand the difficult situations they were in.

Recalling the song in 2013, Mangeshkar stated that she never expected the song to be so successful, saying, "Since it was not part of a film, I thought it would have a limited impact. Ae mere watan ke logo became my signature tune. No show of mine, no concert or event is complete until I sing it." She also stated that Pradeep was always sure of the song's success saying, "Only Pradeepji had faith in the song. He had prophesied to me, 'Lata, tum dekhna yeh gaana bahot chalega. Log hamesha ke liye issey yaad rakhenge (You'll see this song will endure. People will always remember it)'". It is now played during the Beating Retreat Ceremony in place of "Abide with me"
