= Bedari =

1956 film

- Classified of the film published in Pakistan Times
- Directed by: Rafiq Rizvi
- Produced by: Wazir Ali Rizvi
- Starring: Ratan Kumar; Ragni; Santosh Kumar; Meena Shorey; Qazi Wajid; Bibbo; Lehri
- Music by: Fateh Ali Khan
- Release date: 6 December 1956
- Running time: approx. 3 hours
- Country: Pakistan
- Language: Urdu

Bedari is a Pakistani Urdu-language black-and-white film released in 1956.

The film was premiered at Regent cinema, Lahore. It was the first film of Ratan Kumar in Pakistan, after he moved from India with his family. Bedari was commercially successful primarily due to its songs.

Bedari was a plagiarized version of Ratan Kumar's Indian film Jagriti (1954), with replacement of some words, and music was taken directly from Jagriti as well. Upon its release in 1956, it grossed well in its first few weeks. However, on the discovery of plagiarism by the cinemagoers, there was a mass uproar that caused public demonstrations against the exhibition of the film. The Censor Board of Pakistan immediately put a ban on the film.

== Cast ==
- Ratan Kumar
- Ragni
- Santosh Kumar
- Meena Shorey
- Lehri
- Qazi Wajid
- Bibbo

== Music ==
The music of the film was composed by Ustad Fateh Ali Khan, a veteran Pakistani sitar player. The songs were written by Fayyaz Hashmi, and sung by Munawwar Sultana and Saleem Raza. A song which was a straight lift of the 'De Di Humein Azaadi' tune was titled Aye Quaid-e-Azam Tera Ehsaan Hai Ehsaan. The lines 'De di humein azaadi bina khadag bina dhal/ Sabarmati ke sant tu ne kar diya kamaal' had been changed to 'De di humein azaadi kay duniya huyi hairaan/ Aye Quaid-e-Azam tera ehsaan hai ehsaan'. In other words, a song celebrating the Indian Father of the Nation had been transposed to eulogize his Pakistani counterpart.

- Aey Qaid-e-Azam, tera ehsan hai ehsan, by Munawwar Sultana
- Hum laayein hain toofan se kashti nikaal ke, by Saleem Raza
- Aao Bachho Sair Karain Tum Ko Pakistan Ki, by Saleem Raza
- Chalo Chalen Maan Sapnon ke Gaon Mein

Highlight of this film was its popular film songs and music. Ustad Fateh Ali Khan was the foremost sitar player at that time in Pakistan and composed the music of this film. Bedari was also a debut film of now renowned Pakistani actor Qazi Wajid who, as a teenage student, played a very funny role of a student with a stammer disorder.
