= De Dee Hame Azaadi =

Single by Asha Bhosle

from the album Jagriti
- Released: 1954
- Recorded: 1954
- Genre: Film soundtrack, Patriotic song
- Songwriter: Kavi Pradeep
- Composer: Hemant Kumar

Music video
- "De Di Hamein Aazaadi" on YouTube

De Dee Hame Azaadi (Miraculously given us freedom) or Sabarmati ke Sant is an Indian song written by Kavi Pradeep. It is a patriotic song dedicated to Mahatma Gandhi and his non-violence nature. This a film soundtrack of Bollywood film Jagriti (1954). This song was sung by Asha Bhosle.

== See also ==
- List of artistic depictions of Mahatma Gandhi
