= Roxy Cinema (Kolkata) =

Single-screen theater in India

- Location within Kolkata

General information
- Status: Active
- Type: Cinema hall, Heritage building
- Location: Chowringhee Place. near Esplanade Metro, 12 B, Chowringhee Place, Kolkata, India
- Coordinates: 22.5622°N 88.3499°E
- Renovated: 2005

Roxy Cinema is a single screen cinema hall located in Esplanade Metro, Chowringhee Place, Dharmatala, Kolkata, West Bengal, India.

== History ==
Roxy Cinema started as an Opera House. In early 1940s the house was converted into a cinema. The hall had high banisters but during this conversion stage height was removed. In 1941 the first film screened in this theatre was Ashok Kumar-starrer Naya Sansar. Netaji Subhas Chandra Bose came to this theatre to watch Ashok Kumar-starrer Kismet (1943), which ran for 108 weeks at Roxy.

In 2005 the theatre was renovated by its owners. In 2011, Kolkata Municipal Corporation seized the theatre as the theatre owners did not pay lease agreement renewal dues.

== Current status ==
As of July 2012 this cinema is owned by Bengal Properties Private Ltd and the director of this hall is Arun Mehra and the theatre is active. The hall has AC tower, Dolby Digital sound and a 2K projection silver screen. Sitting capacity of this hall is 730.

== See also ==
- Cinema in Kolkata
