= Kismet (1943 film) =

1943 film directed by Gyan Mukherjee

- Poster
- Directed by: Gyan Mukherjee
- Written by: Aghajani Kashmeri
- Screenplay by: Gyan Mukherjee
- Produced by: Bombay Talkies
- Starring: Ashok Kumar; Mumtaz Shanti; Shah Nawaz; Mehmood
- Cinematography: R.D.Pareenja
- Edited by: Dattaram Pai
- Music by: Anil Biswas; Kavi Pradeep (lyrics)
- Release date: 9 January 1943
- Running time: 143 minutes
- Country: India
- Language: Hindustani
- Budget: ₹200,000
- Box office: ₹1.65 crore

Kismet

Kismet (transl. Fate) is a 1943 Indian drama film directed by Gyan Mukherjee and co-written with Agha Jani Kashmiri. The film stars Ashok Kumar, Mumtaz Shanti, and Shah Nawaz. The film introduced several taboo themes to Indian cinema for the first time, including the depiction of an anti-hero and an unwed pregnant woman.

Produced by Bombay Talkies during the Second World War, the film was released amid a succession conflict within the studio between Devika Rani and Sashadhar Mukherjee, following the death of founder Himanshu Rai. Kismet became the first major hit in the history of Bombay cinema and is widely regarded as the first all-India blockbuster in Indian film history.

The film was later remade in Tamil as Prema Pasam (1956), and in Telugu as Bhale Ramudu (1956).

== Plot ==
Shekhar, a seasoned pickpocket and con man, is released from prison after serving his third sentence, and immediately swindles another thief, Banke, of a valuable watch. Banke, impressed by Shekhar’s skill, offers him a proposition to help rob a wealthy employer’s heavily guarded safe. Shekhar declines the offer.

Later, Shekhar encounters the watch’s original owner, an elderly man who had hoped to sell it to attend his daughter Rani’s stage performance. Moved by his plight, Shekhar takes him to the theatre, where the old man identifies Indrajit, a prosperous man who was once his employee. The old man, once the owner of the theatre, is now deeply indebted to Indrajit.

Rani sees her father with Shekhar, not knowing he has been hiding in shame. Meanwhile, Indrajit remains haunted by the memory of his estranged son, Madan, who ran away years ago after a dispute.

Circumstances lead Shekhar to become a paying guest at Rani's home. He learns of her struggles—an injured leg threatens her performing career, and she supports her younger sister, Leela. Matters worsen when Leela becomes pregnant by Mohan, Indrajit's younger son. To support Rani, Shekhar decides to accept Banke’s original offer and attempts to rob Indrajit's safe.

The robbery fails, but Shekhar escapes, leaving behind a distinctive chain. Indrajit recognizes it as belonging to his long-lost son, Madan. Hoping to reunite with him, Indrajit arranges a public performance by Rani, knowing Shekhar will attend.

At the performance, the truth is revealed—Shekhar is indeed Madan. A joyous Indrajit has a change of heart, forgives Rani’s father’s debts, and proposes marriage between his sons and the two sisters, bringing both families together.

== Cast ==
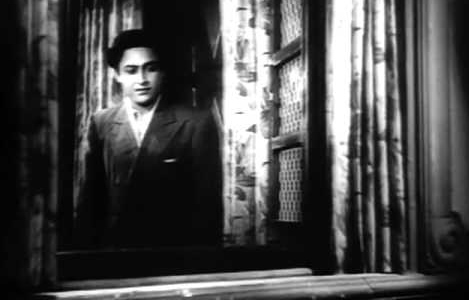
Ashok Kumar in Kismet

- Ashok Kumar as Shekhar/Madan
- Mumtaz Shanti as Rani
- Shah Nawaz as Inspector Saahab
- V.H.Desai as Banke
- Moti as Women
- P. F. Pithawala as Rani's father
- Chandraprabha as Leela, Rani's sister
- Kanu Roy as Mohan, Leela's lover
- David as a Fence/ Pawn-shop owner
- Haroon as Indrajit's Manager
- Baby Kamala as Young Rani
- Mubarak as Indrajit Babu

Supporting cast

- Prahlad, Jagannath Aurora, S. Gulab, Surve, Fateh Mohamed

== Soundtrack ==
The music for Kismet was composed by Anil Biswas and is credited with introducing the "full chorus" technique for the first time in Hindi cinema. The soundtrack featured the patriotic song "Aaj Himalay Ki Choti Se", "Ghar Ghar Mein Diwali", and the lullaby "Dheere Dheere Aa". The lullaby, a duet by Amirbai Karnataki and Arun Kumar, is regarded as one of the most famous compositions of Biswas’s career.

1. "Aaj Himalay Ki Choti Se – Door Hato Ai Duniya Walo" - Singer: Ameerbai Karnataki, Khan Mastana
2. "Ab Tere Siwa Kaun Mera Krishan Kanhaiya" - Singer: Ameerbai Karnataki
3. "Ai Duniya Bata – Ghar Ghar Me Diwali Hai" - Singer: Ameerbai Karnataki
4. "Dhire Dhire Aa Re Badal, Mera Bulbul Sau Raha Hai" (female) - Singer: Ameerbai Karnataki
5. "Dhire Dhire Aa Re Badal, Mera Bulbul Sau Raha Hai" (male) - Singer: Ameerbai Karnataki, Arun Kumar
6. "Ham Aisi Qisamat Ko, Ek Din Hansaaye" - Singer: Ameerbai Karnataki, Arun Kumar
7. "Papihaa Re Mere Piyaa Se Kahiyo Jaay" - Singer: Parul Ghosh
8. "Tere Dukh Ke Din Phirenge, Zindagi Ban Ke Jiye Jaa" - Singer: Arun Kumar

=== Door Hato O Duniya Walon ===
The film featured the patriotic song "Door Hato O Duniya Walon, Hindustan Hamara Hay" ("Step away, O foreigners, Hindustan is ours"), penned by Kavi Pradeep and composed by Anil Biswas. The lyrics contained a veiled anti-colonial message, with direct references to Axis powers—"Tum na kisike aage jhukna, German ho ya Japani" ("Do not bow before anyone, be it the Germans or the Japanese")—which allowed the song to evade British censorship, as Britain was at war with Germany and Japan at the time.

Despite its seemingly pro-Allied tone, the Indian audience understood the song's subtext as a message of national pride and resistance. Released just months after Mahatma Gandhi's Quit India Movement, the song resonated with the prevailing nationalist sentiment. At screenings, the reel was often rewound on public demand to replay the song.

The British authorities attempted to ban the film after observing its impact. A warrant was issued for lyricist Pradeep on charges of sedition, forcing him to go underground to avoid arrest.

== Reception ==
Kismet received criticism from Babu Rao Patel, the editor of Filmindia magazine, for its portrayal of a criminal protagonist in a sympathetic light and for allegedly glorifying crime. Despite such criticism, the film proved to be a massive commercial success, breaking all previous box office records and becoming the first Indian film to earn a net revenue of ₹1 crore.

=== Box office ===
Kismet was the highest-grossing Indian film at the time of its release and played a pivotal role in establishing Ashok Kumar as Indian cinema's first superstar. According to Box Office India, the film achieved the status of an "All-Time Blockbuster" and earned a net revenue of ₹1 crore ($3.32 million). (Note: 3.3223 Indian rupees per US dollar in 1943) When adjusted for inflation, its earnings would amount to over ₹500 crore (approximately US$60 million). (Note: ₹1 crore (US$3.32 million) in 1943 (US$62 million or ₹309 crore in 2016)) This box office record remained unbroken until the release of Barsaat in 1949.

Records

The film premiered on 9 January 1943 at Roxy Talkies in Bombay (now Mumbai). It enjoyed an extended run of over 50 weeks at the same venue and became the first film to celebrate a silver jubilee during a re-release in the same city. Later, on 24 September 1943, Kismet was released at Roxy Cinema in Calcutta (now Kolkata), where it ran for 187 consecutive weeks—setting a record that stood for 32 years. The film reportedly earned more than ₹12 lakh net from a single theater, a record at the time.

Kismet is widely regarded as the first all-India blockbuster and remains one of the biggest hits of pre-independence India. It celebrated golden jubilees in major cities such as Calcutta, Bombay, Karachi, and Delhi, and silver jubilees in Bombay (re-release), Ahmedabad, Baroda, Surat, Nasik, Sholapur, Lahore, Peshawar, Hyderabad (Sindh), Madras, Hyderabad (Deccan), Allahabad, Kanpur, Varanasi, Lucknow, and other prominent centers.

== Legacy ==
Kismet is considered one of the earliest all-India blockbusters in the history of Hindi cinema. The film is notable for introducing several pioneering elements and also addressed bold and progressive themes for its time, such as an anti-hero protagonist and the depiction of an unwed pregnant woman—subjects that were considered unconventional in the 1940s.

Kismet was the first Indian film to employ the "lost and reunited" narrative formula, a trope that later gained popularity in Hindi films of the 1960s and 1970s, including Waqt (1965), Yaadon ki Baraat (1973), and Amar Akbar Anthony (1977). The film's unprecedented success helped establish Ashok Kumar as the first superstar of Hindi cinema, a position he maintained through the early 1950s.

The film's cultural influence continued for decades. In the 1968 film Padosan, the character Bhola references the song "O Jane Wale Balamwa, Laut Ke Aa" from Rattan (1944), which was popularized during the same era as Kismet. A remake of Kismet was released in 1961 under the title Boy Friend, starring Madhubala, Shammi Kapoor and Dharmendra.

== See also ==
- List of highest-grossing Bollywood films
