= Aaj Himalay Ki Choti Se =

Song by Amirbai Karnataki and Khan Mastana
- Language: Hindi/Urdu
- Genre: Patriotic song

Aaj Himalay Ki Choti Se (Hindi: आज हिमालय की चोटी से, Urdu: آج ہمالیہ کی چوٹی سے, romanized: Āj Himālaya Kī Cōṭī Sē, lit. 'Today from the top of the Himalayas') is an Indian patriotic song sung by Amirbai Karnataki and Khan Mastana in the 1943 Bollywood film Kismet.

== Background ==
Kavi Pradeep the writer of the song participated in the Quit India movement. Kavi Pradeep penned the song, 'Aaj Himalay ki choti se'. He was the first to use cinema to propagate Indian nationalism by challenging the British to quit India. The British believed the song to be good propaganda against the Japanese and the Germans fighting World War II, instead the song had spread by word of mouth and was being sung at political rallies across the country for independence of India. It turned Kavi Pradeep from an obscure dissenter to a revolutionary poet. The British considered this song seditious in nature and arrest warrants were issued against Kavi Pradeep and the composer of the song, Anil Biswas.

== Lyrics ==
=== Hindi ===
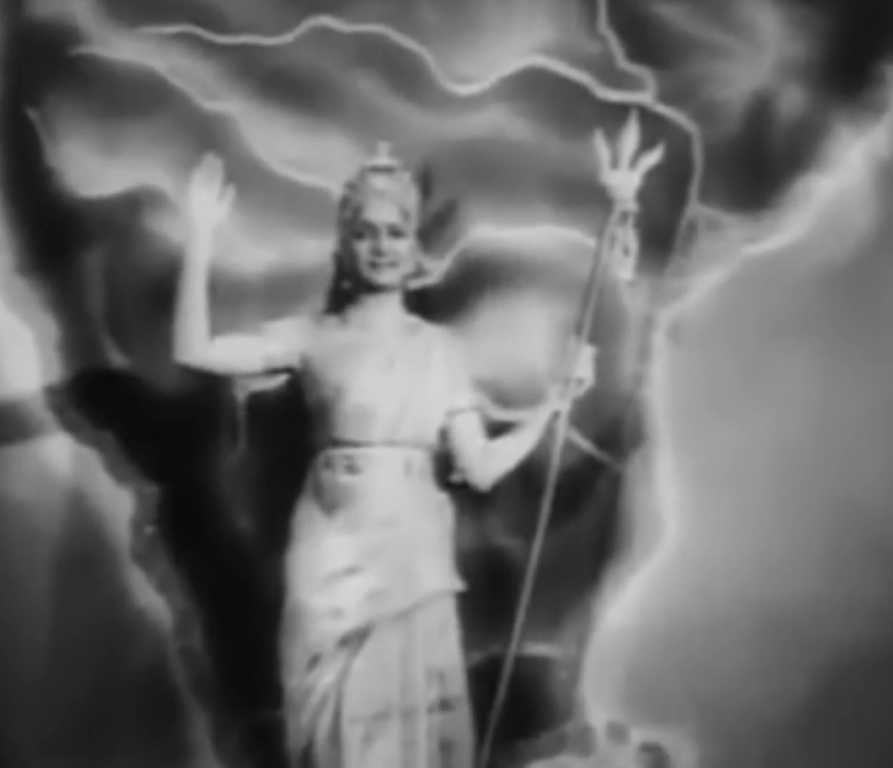
Mother India depicted in the song

आज हिमालय की चोटी से
फिर हम ने ललकारा है
आज हिमालय की चोटी से
फिर हम ने ललकारा है
दूर हटो दूर हटो
दूर हटो ऐ दुनिया वालों
हिंदुस्तान हमारा है
दूर हटो ऐ दुनिया वालों
हिंदुस्तान हमारा है

जहाँ हमारा ताज महल है और
क़ुतब मीनार है
जहाँ हमारा ताज महल है और
क़ुतब मीनार है
जहाँ हमारे मंदिर मस्जिद
सिखों का गुरुद्वारा है
जहाँ हमारे मंदिर मस्जिद
सिखों का गुरुद्वारा है
जहाँ हमारा ताज महल है और
क़ुतब मीनार है
जहाँ हमारे मंदिर मस्जिद
सिखों का गुरुद्वारा है

इस धरती पर क़दम बढ़ाना
अत्याचार तुम्हारा है
अत्याचार तुम्हारा है
दूर हटो दूर हटो
दूर हटो ऐ दुनिया वालों
हिंदुस्तान हमारा है
दूर हटो ऐ दुनिया वालों
हिंदुस्तान हमारा है
आज हिमालय की चोटी से
फिर हम ने ललकारा है
आज हिमालय की चोटी से
फिर हम ने ललकारा है
दूर हटो दूर हटो
दूर हटो ऐ दुनिया वालों
हिंदुस्तान हमारा है
दूर हटो ऐ दुनिया वालों
हिंदुस्तान हमारा

शुरू हुआ है जंग तुम्हारा
जाग उठो हिन्दुस्तानी
तुम न किसी के आगे झुकना
जर्मन हो या जापानी
शुरू हुआ है जंग तुम्हारा
जाग उठो हिन्दुस्तानी
तुम न किसी के आगे झुकना
जर्मन हो या जापानी
आज सभी के लिए हमारा
यही क़ौमी नैरा है
आज सभी के लिए हमारा
यही क़ौमी नैरा है
दूर हटो दूर हटो
दूर हटो ऐ दुनिया वालों
हिंदुस्तान हमारा है
दूर हटो ऐ दुनिया वालों
हिंदुस्तान हमारा है
आज हिमालय की चोटी से
फिर हम ने ललकारा है
आज हिमालय की चोटी से
फिर हम ने ललकारा है

जहाँ हमारा ताज महल है और
क़ुतब मीनार है
जहाँ हमारा ताज महल है और
क़ुतब मीनार है
जहाँ हमारे मंदिर मस्जिद
सिखों का गुरुद्वारा है
जहाँ हमारे मंदिर मस्जिद
सिखों का गुरुद्वारा है
जहाँ हमारा ताज महल है
और क़ुतब मीनार है
जहाँ हमारे मंदिर मस्जिद
सिखों का गुरुद्वारा है

इस धरती पर क़दम बढ़ाना
अत्याचार तुम्हारा है
अत्याचार तुम्हारा है
दूर हटो दूर हटो
दूर हटो ऐ दुनिया वालों
हिंदुस्तान हमारा है
दूर हटो ऐ दुनिया वालों
हिंदुस्तान हमारा है
आज हिमालय की चोटी से
फिर हम ने ललकारा है
आज हिमालय की चोटी से
फिर हम ने ललकारा है
दूर हटो दूर
हटो दूर हटो दूर हटो.

=== Urdu ===
آج ہمالیہ کی چوٹی سے
پھر ہم نے للک
آج ہمالیہ کی چوٹی سے
پھر ہم نے للکارا ہے!
دُور ہٹو! دُور ہٹو!
دُور ہٹو! اے دنیا والوں
ہندوستان ہمارا ہے
دُور ہٹو! اے دنیا والوں
ہندوستان ہمارا ہے
جہاں ہمارا تاج محل ہے
اور قطب مینار ہے
جہاں ہمارا تاج محل ہے
اور قطب مینار ہے
جہاں ہمارے مندر مسجد
سکھوں کا گردوارہ ہے
جہاں ہمارے مندر مسجد
سکھوں کا گردوارہ ہے
جہاں ہمارا تاج محل ہے
اور قطب مینار ہے
جہاں ہمارے مندر مسجد
سکھوں کا گردوارہ ہے
اس دھرتی پر قدم بڑھانا
اَتّیاچار تمہارا ہے!
اَتّیاچار تمہارا ہے!
دُور ہٹو! دُور ہٹو!
دُور ہٹو! اے دنیا والوں
ہندوستان ہمارا ہے
دُور ہٹو! اے دنیا والوں
ہندوستان ہمارا ہے
آج ہمالیہ کی چوٹی سے
پھر ہم نے للکارا ہے!
آج ہمالیہ کی چوٹی سے
پھر ہم نے للکارا ہے!
دُور ہٹو! دُور ہٹو!
دُور ہٹو! اے دنیا والوں
ہندوستان ہمارا ہے
دُور ہٹو! اے دنیا والوں
ہندوستان ہمارا ہے
شروع ہوا ہے جنگ تمہارا!
جاگ اٹھو ہندوستانی!
تم نہ کسی کے آگے جھُکنا!
جرمن ہو یا جاپانی!
شروع ہوا ہے جنگ تمہارا!
جاگ اٹھو ہندوستانی!
تم نہ کسی کے آگے جھُکنا!
جرمن ہو یا جاپانی!
آج سبھی کے لئے ہمارا
یہی قومی نعرہ ہے!
آج سبھی کے لئے ہمارا
یہی قومی نعرہ ہے!
دُور ہٹو! دُور ہٹو!
دُور ہٹو! اے دنیا والوں
ہندوستان ہمارا ہے
دُور ہٹو! اے دنیا والوں
ہندوستان ہمارا ہے
آج ہمالیہ کی چوٹی سے
پھر ہم نے للکارا ہے!
آج ہمالیہ کی چوٹی سے
پھر ہم نے للکارا ہے!
جہاں ہمارا تاج محل ہے
اور قطب مینار ہے
جہاں ہمارا تاج محل ہے
اور قطب مینار ہے
جہاں ہمارے مندر مسجد
سکھوں کا گردوارہ ہے
جہاں ہمارے مندر مسجد
سکھوں کا گردوارہ ہے
جہاں ہمارا تاج محل ہے
اور قطب مینار ہے
جہاں ہمارے مندر مسجد
سکھوں کا گردوارہ ہے
اس دھرتی پر قدم بڑھانا
اَتّیاچار تمہارا ہے!
اَتّیاچار تمہارا ہے!
دُور ہٹو! دُور ہٹو!
دُور ہٹو! اے دنیا والوں
ہندوستان ہمارا ہے
دُور ہٹو! اے دنیا والوں
ہندوستان ہمارا ہے
آج ہمالیہ کی چوٹی سے
پھر ہم نے للکارا ہے!
آج ہمالیہ کی چوٹی سے
پھر ہم نے للکارا ہے!
دُور ہٹو! دُور ہٹو!
دُور ہٹو! دُور ہٹو!

== See also ==
- Indian independence movement
- Indian reunification
- Opposition to the partition of India
- Partition of India
