= Dayavan =

1988 film directed by Feroz Khan

Dayavan: Truth is Power
- Theatrical release poster
- Directed by: Feroz Khan
- Story by: Mani Ratnam
- Based on: Nayakan by Mani Ratnam
- Produced by: Feroz Khan; G. Venkateswaran
- Starring: Vinod Khanna; Feroz Khan; Madhuri Dixit; Aditya Pancholi
- Cinematography: Kamal Bose
- Edited by: Feroz Khan
- Music by: Laxmikant Pyarelal
- Release date: 1988
- Running time: 183 minutes
- Country: India
- Language: Hindi
- Budget: ₹2.25 crore
- Box office: ₹7.44 crore

Dayavan (transl. The Compassionate) is a 1988 Indian Hindi-language action crime film directed by Feroz Khan. It is a remake of the 1987 Tamil film Nayakan, though the original Tamil version was dubbed in Hindi. The film stars Feroz Khan (Dayavan’s friend), Vinod Khanna (Dayavan) and Madhuri Dixit (Prostitute) with Aditya Pancholi (Dayavan's son-in-Law) in important roles.

The film was famous for its passionate kissing scene between Khanna and Madhuri Dixit. Khan was originally working on Yalgaar (1992) but after watching Nayakan on Tinu Anand's suggestion he decided to remake it and originally wanted to play the main character but later decided to step down and contacted his old friend Vinod Khanna who had just returned from a 5 year long hiatus. This was Khan's 3rd and final collaboration with Khanna after Shankar Shambhu (1976) and Qurbani (1980). The film is remembered for romantic kissing scenes between Vinod Khanna and Madhuri Dixit and Khanna's powerful performance, which is considered to be one of his best.

== Plot ==
After having witnessed his dad being killed by the local police, and being orphaned and homeless, Shakti Velu develops hatred and distrust of the police in India. He is befriended by another homeless boy named Shanker, who asks him to accompany him to Bombay's slums, where they live with a kind-hearted Muslim named Karim Baba, and his daughter, Shama. This is where Shakti and Shankar spend their childhood. When they mature, they take to petty crime. Here too, Shakti witnesses police brutality and atrocities, especially at the hands of sadistic, alcoholic, and womanizing Police Inspector Ratan Singh. When Karim Baba is arrested, jailed, and found hanging by his neck in police custody, Shakti hunts down Ratan Singh, and kills him in broad daylight in front of several hundred people. An investigation is launched, but no one comes forward as a witness. Thus Shakti gets his reputation as a Don with a good heart i.e., Dayavan. Shakti marries a local prostitute, Neelu, and has two children, Suraj and Sarita. He becomes even more powerful and influential all over Bombay, and his working partners are powerful criminal dons who have ruled over Bombay for eons. Shakti eventually replaces these dons and becomes Bombay's only Don. This creates enemies for him and his family, but he believes since he has not really done any harm to anyone, he and his family will be safe. It is this belief that will take a heavy toll on his life and that of his family when the truth dawns that he, himself, is responsible for being kind to a man, who will ultimately bring forward ruin to the Velu family.

== Cast ==
- Vinod Khanna as Shakti Velu aka Dayavan
- Feroz Khan as Shanker Waghmare
- Madhuri Dixit as Neelu, a local prostitute and later wife of Shakti
- Aditya Pancholi as Dayavan's son-in-Law
- Amrish Puri as Inspector Ratan Singh
- Aanjjan Srivastav as Superintendent of Police
- Amala Akkineni as Sarita
- Anuradha Patel as Shama
- Aruna Irani as Tara
- Tinnu Anand as Ajit Singh, Ratan Singh's son
- Alok Nath as Karim Baba
- Naresh Suri as Tora Swami
- Imtiaz Khan as Anna
- Sudhir Pandey as Manjle Anna
- Mangal Dhillon as Chhote Anna
- Mahaveer Shah as Choksi Bhai
- Ramya Krishnan in an item number
- Prem Kumar

== Soundtrack ==
The soundtrack is available on T-Series, and is composed by veteran music directors Laxmikant–Pyarelal. The hit song "Aaj Phir Tum Pe" was recreated in 2014 for the film Hate Story 2, with vocals rendered by Arijit Singh and Samira Koppikar. "Chahe Meri Jaan Tu Le Le" was recreated in 2019 for the film Marjaavaan with vocals rendered by Tulsi Kumar and Jubin Nautiyal.

#	Title	Singer(s)	Lyrics
1	"Aaj Phir Tum Pe"	Pankaj Udhas, Anuradha Paudwal	Aziz Qaisi
2	"Kahe Saiyan Teri Meri Baat"	Kavita Krishnamurthy, Alka Yagnik	Aziz Qaisi
3	"Dil Tera Kisne Toda"	Mohammad Aziz	Indeewar
4	"Diwani Tum Jawanon Ki"	Jolly Mukherjee, Sapna Mukherjee, Mohammad Aziz	Indeewar
5	"Chahe Meri Jaan Tu Le Le"	Jolly Mukherjee, Sapna Mukherjee	Indeewar

== Reception ==
Simran Bhargava of India Today wrote "While Khan's film doesn't reach the peaks touched by Nayakan, it is still the best film he has made. The gloss is all there but the western tints of Apradh and Qurbani are gone. This one belongs to India." The film includes erotic scenes such as Madhuri and Vinod taking bath together where she can be seen cleaning the armpits of Vinod and rubbing his back along with Vinod Khanna kissing Madhuri Dixit’s navel multiple times. Their kissing and bed scenes are still popular to this day and received criticism from the audiences for its boldness as well at the same time, as Madhuri Dixit compromised herself for the movie and Vinod Khanna.
