= Matka gambling =

Form of gambling

Matka gambling or satta is a form of betting and lottery which originally involved betting on the opening and closing rates of cotton transmitted from the New York Cotton Exchange to the Bombay Cotton Exchange. It originates from before the Partition of India when it was known as Ankada Jugar ("figures gambling"). In the 1960s, the system was replaced with other ways of generating random numbers, including pulling slips from a large earthenware pot known as a matka, or dealing with playing cards.

Matka gambling is illegal in India.

== History ==
In the original form of the game, betting would take place on the opening and closing rates of cotton as transmitted to the Bombay Cotton Exchange from the New York Cotton Exchange, via teleprinters.

In 1961, the New York Cotton Exchange stopped the practice, which caused the punters to look for alternative ways to keep the matka business alive. A Sindhi migrant from Karachi, Pakistan, Ratan Khatri introduced the idea of declaring opening and closing rates of imaginary products and playing cards. Numbers would be written on pieces of paper and put into a matka, a large earthen pitcher. One person would then draw a chit and declare the winning numbers. Over the years, the practice changed, so that three numbers were drawn from a pack of playing cards, but the name "matka" was kept.

In 1962, Kalyanji Bhagat started the Worli matka. Ratan Khatri then introduced the New Worli matka in 1964, with slight modifications to the rules of the game with odds that were more favourable to the public. Kalyanji Bhagat's matka ran every day of the week, whereas Ratan Khatri's matka ran only five days a week, from Monday to Friday and later as it gained immense popularity and became synonymous with his name, it began to be called Main Ratan matka.

During the flourishing of textile mills in Mumbai, many mill workers played matka, resulting in bookies opening their shops in and around the mill areas, predominantly located in Parel in Central Mumbai and Kalbadevi in South Mumbai.

The decades of 1980s and 1990s saw the matka business reach its peak. Betting volumes in excess of Rs. 500 crore would be laid every month. The Mumbai Police’s massive crackdown on the matka dens forced dealers to shift their hideouts to the city’s outskirts. Many of them moved to Gujarat, Rajasthan and other states. With no major source of betting in the city, many punters were attracted to other forms of gambling such as online and zhatpat lotteries. Meanwhile, some rich punters began to explore betting on cricket matches.

In 1995 there were more than 2,000 big and medium-time bookies in the city and neighboring towns, but since then the numbers have declined substantially to less than 300. During the 2000s, the average monthly turnover has remained around Rs. 100 crore. The modern matka business is centred around Maharashtra.

== How to play ==
To play, a gambler chooses three numbers between 0 and 9. The three chosen numbers are added together and the second digit of this resulting number is noted down alongside the original three chosen numbers. This leaves the gambler with four numbers, from which point they may bet on the various likelihoods of the numbers or number sequences appearing or being chosen from the pot.

== Matka kings ==
The leader of a matka gambling syndicate is called a "matka king".

=== Kalyanji Bhagat ===
Kalyanji Bhagat was born a farmer in the village of Ratadia, Games Wala in Kutch, Gujarat. Kalyanji's family name was Gala and the name Bhagat, a modification of bhakt, was a title given to their family by the King of Kutch for their religiousness.

He arrived as a migrant in Bombay in 1941 and initially did odd jobs such as masala ferriwala (spice seller) to managing a grocery store. In the 1960s, when Kalyanji Bhagat was running a grocery shop in Worli, he began the first rudimentary form of matka gambling by accepting bets based on the opening and closing rates of cotton traded on the New York wholesale market. He used to operate from the compound of his building Vinod Mahal, in Worli. After his death in the early 1990s, his son Suresh Bhagat eventually took over his business.

=== Ratan Khatri ===
Ratan Khatri, known as the original Matka King, from the early 1960s to mid-1990s controlled a nationwide illegal gambling network with international connections which involved several lakh punters and dealt with crores of rupees.

Khatri's matka syndicate started in the bustling business area of Dhanji Street in Mumbadevi where idlers used to wager on the daily trickle of the fluctuating cotton rates from the New York market. Gradually, it became a big gambling hub as the quantum of bets and betters increased. Due to a row over a winning number plus the New York market's five-day week schedule, compulsive betters began looking for alternatives. Based on the requests of his friends, Khatri started his own syndicate and started drawing three cards to decide the day's number. Khatri used to draw three cards, twice daily at 9.00pm (the 'open') and at midnight (the 'close'). The value of the open and close cards would be totalled to arrive at a winning number. The numbers would be relayed all across the betting hubs in the country and overseas. For a 25 paise bet the returns were at least Rs. 2.25 or more. Khatri's betting was considered more genuine as the cards were reportedly opened in the presence of patrons. During the emergency in India, Khatri was jailed and served 19 months behind bars. In the early 1990s, he retired from the gambling business and was living near Tardeo; however, he still continued to visit the Mahalaxmi Racecourse to bet on his favourite horses. He died on May 9, 2020.

== Terminology ==
Term	Meaning/Explanation
Matka	The word matka is derived from a word for an earthen pot. Such pots were used in the past to draw the numbers.
Single	Any digit between 0 and 9 which involves in betting.
Jodi/Pair	Any pair of two digits between 00 and 99 involves in matka (e.g. : 52)
Patti/Panna	A three digit result comes as betting result. All three digit number is patti/panna. Only limited 3 digit numbers are used.
Open result / close result	The outcome of matka betting is divided into two parts. The first part is called open result and the second part close result.
SP/DP/TP	SP stands for Single Patti e.g. 123, DP stands for Double Patti e.g. 112, and TP stands for Triple Patti e.g. 111
Cycle Patti	The last two digit of the patti is called the cycle patti or cp (e.g. if the patti is 128, the cycle patti is 28)
Farak	The Farak is how many difference from close result to open result (e.g.if the jodi/pair is 57, 7–5; the farak is 2; some another: "73" is 13-7 - 6 )
Berij	The Berij is last digit of jodi's/pair's sum. (e.g. if pair is 76, berij is 7+6 = 13; last digit is 3; means berij is 3)

== Influence on Bollywood ==
The matka business and the lives of the matka kings also had an influence on Bollywood. Prem Nath played Ratan Khatri in the Feroz Khan film Dharmatma, which was based on the life of Khatri. Khatri himself financed and even acted in the movie Rangila Ratan.
