= Ratan Khatri =

Indian gambling and pioneer of Matka betting

Ratan Khatri (c. 1932 – 9 May 2020) was an Indian gambling kingpin and film producer, widely regarded as the "Matka King" for his central role in transforming matka, a form of betting, into one of the most lucrative underground industries.

== Early life ==
Ratan Khatri was born into a Sindhi Hindu family in Karachi, British India. Following the Partition in 1947, his family migrated to Mumbai (then Bombay). As a teenager, Khatri began working in Mumbai's bustling textile markets and mill areas where he was introduced to gambling on cotton exchange numbers.

Over several decades, he established a nationwide gambling network that became synonymous with his name and legacy.

== Career ==
A Kutchi trader Kalyanji Bhagat had introduced Worli Matka, a form of betting on cotton prices transmitted from the New York Cotton Exchange. Khatri and his friends used to allegedly bet on those cotton market prices. In 1962, Khatri’s friends asked him to start his own syndicate and he then established "Ratan Matka," or “Main Bazaar” Matka which soon became a household name. He simplified the game by introducing 3 card draws using playing cards (from 1-10) from an earthen pot (matka), which added transparency and credibility to the process.

By the 1970s, Ratan Matka had become a nationwide phenomenon with daily turnovers reportedly reaching ₹5 crore. His clientele included people from all walks of life, including Bollywood celebrities and high-profile businessmen. However, his business faced challenges during India's Emergency period (1975–1977), when he was imprisoned for 19 months by then prime minister Indira Gandhi.

== Decline and retirement ==
The matka business began to decline in the 1990s due to increased police action due to mafia involvement and internal disputes within the gambling community. Khatri even ventured into film financing, distribution and producing for some time. In 1993, Khatri retired from active involvement in matka betting after an incident where he was placed on a no-fly list during a family vacation. Following his retirement, other operators attempted to take over the trade, but none could replicate his success or influence.

== Legacy ==
Ratan Khatri is remembered as India’s prominent bookmaker and a betting pioneer who transformed matka into a widespread commercial operation. Despite its illegal status, matka became deeply ingrained in Mumbai's social and cultural fabric under his leadership. His methods of conducting his daily draws openly in public settings earned him a reputation for transparency and fairness among big betters across India and foreign countries.

Khatri died on 9th May 2020 at his residence in Tardeo, South Mumbai following a cardiac arrest. He was 88 years old.

== Popular culture ==
Khatri's life has inspired numerous portrayals in popular media including Dharmatma (1975).

2024 Telugu film titled Matka starring Varun Tej and 2026 Hindi biopic series titled "Matka King" starring Vijay Varma, both were inspired by his life and times. Roy Kapur Films and Aat Pat Productions, highlighting Khatri’s rise in India as the "Matka King" and the impact of matka gambling on Indian society post independence.

== Additional sources ==
- "'Matka King' Ratan Khatri dead". The Economic Times. 10 May 2020.
- "Sairat fame Nagraj Manjule to direct Matka King, a series based on gambler Ratan Khatri with Siddharth Roy Kapur". News18. 17 December 2021.
- "What is Satta Matka? How it is played". India Today. 26 September 2018.
- "'Matka King' Ratan Khatri passes away in Mumbai". The Indian Express. 10 May 2020.
- "Matka is a biopic on Ratan Khetri". Deccan Chronicle.
- "Ratan Khatri, matka king of 60s–90s, dead". Mumbai Mirror. 10 May 2020.
- "'Matka King' Ratan Khatri dead". Business Standard. 10 May 2020.
