= Parsi Dairy Farm =

Dairy business in Mumbai, India

- Industry: Dairy
- Founded: 1916; 109 years ago
- Headquarters: Mumbai, India
- Products: Milk, ghee, butter, lassi, kulfis
- Website: parsidairyfarm.com

Parsi Dairy Farm is a dairy business in Mumbai that was established in 1916. The dairy produces milk, ghee, pasteurized white butter, lassi, kulfis and Indian sweets.

== History ==
Nariman Ardeshir, a Parsi entrepreneur, established the Parsi dairy farm in 1916. It continued to serve south Bombay households and other districts of Mumbai. The branches are at Dadar, and several districts of Bombay. Parsi milk dairy has reduced from supplying 15,000 litres of milk a day to barely 2,000 litres today. The major bulk of the purchasers are from south Mumbai, from Walkeshwar to Cuffe Parade and Colaba.

Presently, the dairy business of Parsi milk dairy is not very lucrative. The Parsi dairy farm was established on agricultural land in Warvada village, at the Maharashtra-Gujarat border. The family bought the plot in 1968 for livestock and to support its dairy activities. Now it is expected to fetch around Rs 200 crore. During 2006 A labour strike was organised, which crippled the dairy business. The Nariman family claims that the annual turnover today is around Rs 10 crore. Many other competitors are in the market in Mumbai, and around Maharashtra.

The Narimans appointed a real estate consultant, Pranay Vakil of Praron Consultancy, to advise them on the land sale. However, it was reported in late August 2015 that the dairy's owners stated that it will not close.

== Bibliography ==
- "Parsi Dairy Farm won't shut down, 300 acre agricultural land holding to be disposed off". Firstpost. 24 August 2015.
- Nauzer BharuchaNauzer Bharucha, TNN (24 August 2015). "Mumbai's 99-year-old iconic Parsi Dairy Farm may shut shop". The Times of India.
