= Indian Trading League =

- Industry: Stock Market
- Headquarters: Mumbai, Maharashtra, India
- Number of locations: India
- Products: Stock Trading Competition; Share Market Tournament; Medals
- Website: www.indiantradingleague.com

The Indian Trading League was a stock market and commodity market competition held in India in 2015 and 2016 by the brokerage company SAMCO Securities. Its investors includes cricketer Kapil Dev, and Bay Capital founder Siddharth Mehta.

== Formats ==
The competition had six formats

- Trader's League: for participants trading in the equities and derivatives segment of the National Stock Exchange of India and the Bombay Stock Exchange,
- Investor's League: for all participants who have not traded in the Futures and Options Segments,
- Women's League: for female participants of the Trader's and Investor's Leagues,
- Commodities League: for participants trading in the commodity futures segment on the Multi Commodity Exchange,
- Royale League: for participants having minimum capital of ₹ 500,000
- Students League: for student participants below the age of 27,

The league ran daily, weekly, monthly, quarterly and annually.
