= Chunaoti =

- Poster
- Directed by: Satpal
- Starring: Feroz Khan; Neetu Singh; Danny Denzongpa; Dharmendra (special appearance)
- Cinematography: Sudarshan Nag
- Edited by: Govind Dalwadi
- Music by: Laxmikant–Pyarelal
- Distributed by: Heera International
- Release date: 14 March 1980
- Running time: 136 minutes
- Country: India
- Language: Hindi
- Budget: ₹14−20 million
- Box office: ₹38 million

Chunaoti is a 1980 Indian Hindi-language action adventure film directed by Satpal. The film stars Feroz Khan, Neetu Singh, Danny Denzongpa and Dharmendra (in a special appearance).

The film took six years to complete. By the time it was released, Neetu Singh had already retired from acting after marrying Rishi Kapoor and Feroz Khan had stopped acting in outside productions. Upon release, it received mixed reviews, with many critics making indifferent comparisons of the film's premise with Dharmatma (1975), Khote Sikkay (1974) and Kaala Sona (1975), the earlier films of Khan and Denzongpa based on the same theme. At the box office, it was moderately successful and the 14th highest grossing film of 1980.

== Cast ==
Cast overview :
| Feroz Khan | Vijay |
| Neetu Singh | Roshni |
| Danny Denzongpa | Thakur Ajay Singh |
| Dharmendra (special appearance) | Shakti Singh |
| Padma Khanna | Jwala |
| Satyendra Kapoor | Thakur Shamsher Singh 'Kaka' |
| Kumud Chuggani | Jyoti |
| Paidi Jairaj | Inspector General |
| Rajan Haksar | Police Commissioner |
| Mumtaz Begum | Vijay's mother |
| Mohan Choti | Shastri Totaram |
| Kamal Kapoor | Thakur Yashpal Singh |
| Anjana Mumtaz | Geeta Singh |
| Asha Potdar | Mrs. Yashpal Singh |
| Sujata Bakshi | Raksha |
| Maruti | Maruti Rao |

== Soundtrack ==
Lyrics: Verma Malik

| Song | Singer |
|---|---|
| "Mehfil Mein Paimana Jo Laga Jhumne" | Kishore Kumar, Suman Kalyanpur |
| "Har Subah Tumhari Mehfil Men" | Lata Mangeshkar, Asha Bhosle |
| "Main Rok Loongi Tujhe Aake" | Asha Bhosle |
| "Sanjh Ki Bela Ek Albela" | Asha Bhosle |
