= Channi Singh =

British-Indian bhangra musician

- Born: Harcharanjit Singh Rupal
- Occupations: Musician
- Years active: 1977 – present

Harcharanjit Singh Rupal OBE, known professionally as Channi Singh, is a British-Indian bhangra musician, known as the "godfather" of bhangra in the West.

== Career ==
Channi is the co-founder, lead singer, producer, and director of Alaap. He came from Malerkotla, Punjab to the UK in 1975 and gradually started the popularity of Punjabi music among the Punjabi youth in the UK, forming the Alaap group in 1977 with Harjeet Gandhi, Randhir Sahota, and Inder Kalsi. By using both Western and Punjabi folk instruments, the group produced a new and more modern style in Punjabi music, later known as UK Bhangra. Alaap has performed with UB40 and performed at Madison Square Garden in United States, Al-Nasir Indoor Stadium in Dubai, and Royal Albert Hall in London. The band was described as ‘Simply the Best’ by the Gurkhas in Bosnia and Herzegovina. He has also performed in Canada, Australia and other countries. In 1992, Alaap became the first British Asian band to perform in Pakistan.

== Awards and recognition ==
Singh has received is the Lifetime Achievement for Punjabi music from the Lord Mayor of Leicester, Mary Draycott, at the 13th anniversary celebrations of BBC Radio's Punjabi Programme. He was the first singer ever to be given the lifetime achievement award by BBC.

Channi Singh was the first British Asian to be appointed as an honorary Senior Lecturer of Music at Liverpool University. He has composed music for Feroz Khan's films and Bollywood films such as Yalgaar, Shaktimaan, Janasheen and Top less.

Singh was appointed Officer of the Order of the British Empire (OBE) in the 2012 Birthday Honours for services to bhangra music, charity and the community in Hounslow.

In mid 2012, Channi signed a worldwide publishing deal with independent music publishers Fairwood Music.

In 2017, he was awarded "Lifetime Achievement Award" at the Brit Asia TV Music Awards.

== Discography ==
=== Films ===
- Yalgaar (1992)
- Shaktiman (1993)
- Teri Mohabbat Ke Naam (1999)
- Janasheen (2003)
- Top Less
- Mr. Bhatti on Chutti (2012)

=== Albums ===
- Alaap - The Greatest Hits - A 4-CD Set by Moviebox

== See also ==
- List of British Sikhs
