= Janasheen =

2003 Indian film by Feroz Khan

- Directed by: Feroz Khan
- Written by: Kamlesh Pandey (dialogue)
- Screenplay by: Shairaz Ahmed; Suparn Verma; Feroz Khan
- Story by: Suparn Verma
- Produced by: Rajpal Narula; Feroz Khan
- Starring: Feroz Khan; Fardeen Khan; Celina Jaitly
- Cinematography: Neelabh Kaul
- Edited by: Feroz Khan
- Music by: Anand Raj Anand; Channi Singh; Mrunal Sampath; Sukhwinder Singh; Biddu
- Production company: FK Films
- Release date: 28 November 2003
- Running time: 161 minutes
- Country: India
- Language: Hindi
- Budget: ₹10–17 crore
- Box office: ₹15.87 crore

Janasheen (transl. Heir) is a 2003 Indian Hindi-language romantic action thriller film co-written, edited, produced and directed by Feroz Khan who stars along with his son, Fardeen Khan, and Celina Jaitly in her film debut. It was partly shot in Afghanistan.

== Plot ==
Lucky Kapoor lives in Australia and has no interest in taking over his father, Virendra Kapoor's business in India. Meanwhile, Saba Karim Shah has a great interest in a plot of land owned by Mr. Kapoor, but Mr. Kapoor has no interest in selling. Shah thus has Mr. Kapoor killed, making it look like an accident. Jessica Periera, a childhood sweetheart of Lucky, has proof that Mr. Kapoor's death was not an accident—but she keeps it to herself. When Karim Shah meets with Lucky to renegotiate, he finds that Lucky is willing to sell—but he also discovers that Lucky bears a striking resemblance to his own dead son. Although Karim Shah will do anything to make Lucky heir to his own wealth and properties, Lucky remains unwilling.

== Cast ==
- Feroz Khan as Saba Karim Shah
- Fardeen Khan as Lucky Kapoor and Hams (double role)
- Celina Jaitly as Jessica Periera
- Harsh Chhaya as Virendra Kapoor
- Yash Tonk as Max Periera
- Kashmera Shah as Tina
- Punita Trikha as Jewellery Designer
- Pinky Harwani as Reema
- Mangal Dhillon as Jaichand
- Johnny Lever as Johnny Chan
- Archana Puran Singh as Martha
- Shiva Rindani as Chang

== Soundtrack ==
Janasheen

Soundtrack album by Anand Raj Anand Sukhwinder Singh Channi Singh Biddu
- Released: 19 July 2003
- Genre: Feature film soundtrack
- Label: T-Series

No.	Title	Lyrics	Music	Artist(s)	Length
1.	"Pyar Hone Laga Hai"	Praveen Bhardwaj	Anand Raj Anand	Sonu Nigam, Alka Yagnik
2.	"Nashe Nashe Mein Yaar"	Tejpal Kaur	Anand Raj Anand	Adnan Sami, Sunidhi Chauhan
3.	"Deewani Hoon Deewani Hoon"	Timon Singh	Biddu	Sonu Nigam, Jaspinder Narula, Gauri Bapat
4.	"Marhaba"	Ibrahim Ashq	Sukhwinder Singh	Sukhwinder Singh, Muskan
5.	"Ishq Fitrat Hai Meri"	Dev Kohli	Anand Raj Anand	Sukhwinder Singh, Sunidhi Chauhan
6.	"Ankhiyan Ankhiyan"	Ijaz Ahmed Ijaz	Channi Singh, Mrinal Sampat	Sukhwinder Singh
7.	"Dil Ne Dil Se Tujhe Pukara"	Dev Kohli	Anand Raj Anand	Gauri Bapat
8.	"Ab Ke Baar Poonam Mein"	Zafar Gorakhpuri	Channi Singh, Mrinal Sampat	Babul Supriyo, Gauri Bapat

== Reception ==
=== Critical response ===
Smitha Parigi of Rediff.com wrote "Overall, the film is eye-candy. Skin and the landscapes of Australia are in lush abundance. Like any Feroz Khan film, watch the film only for style." Namrata Joshi of Outlook India gave the film 1 out of 5 stars stating "Watching the film is like feasting on cold and congealed leftovers of yesterday." Anupama Chopra of India Today wrote, "what was edgy 20 years ago - think Dharmatma and Qurbani - is now archaic. So while the narrative hops continents (India, Australia, Afghanistan) and characters fight over a night club, you begin to ponder the peripherals."

== Awards ==
Won:

- IIFA Award for Best Performance in a Negative Role – Feroz Khan

Nominated:

- IIFA Award for Best Film – Feroz Khan
- IIFA Award for Best Supporting Actor – Yash Tonk
- IIFA Award for Best Story – Feroz Khan
