= Kulhar =

Disposable pottery cup

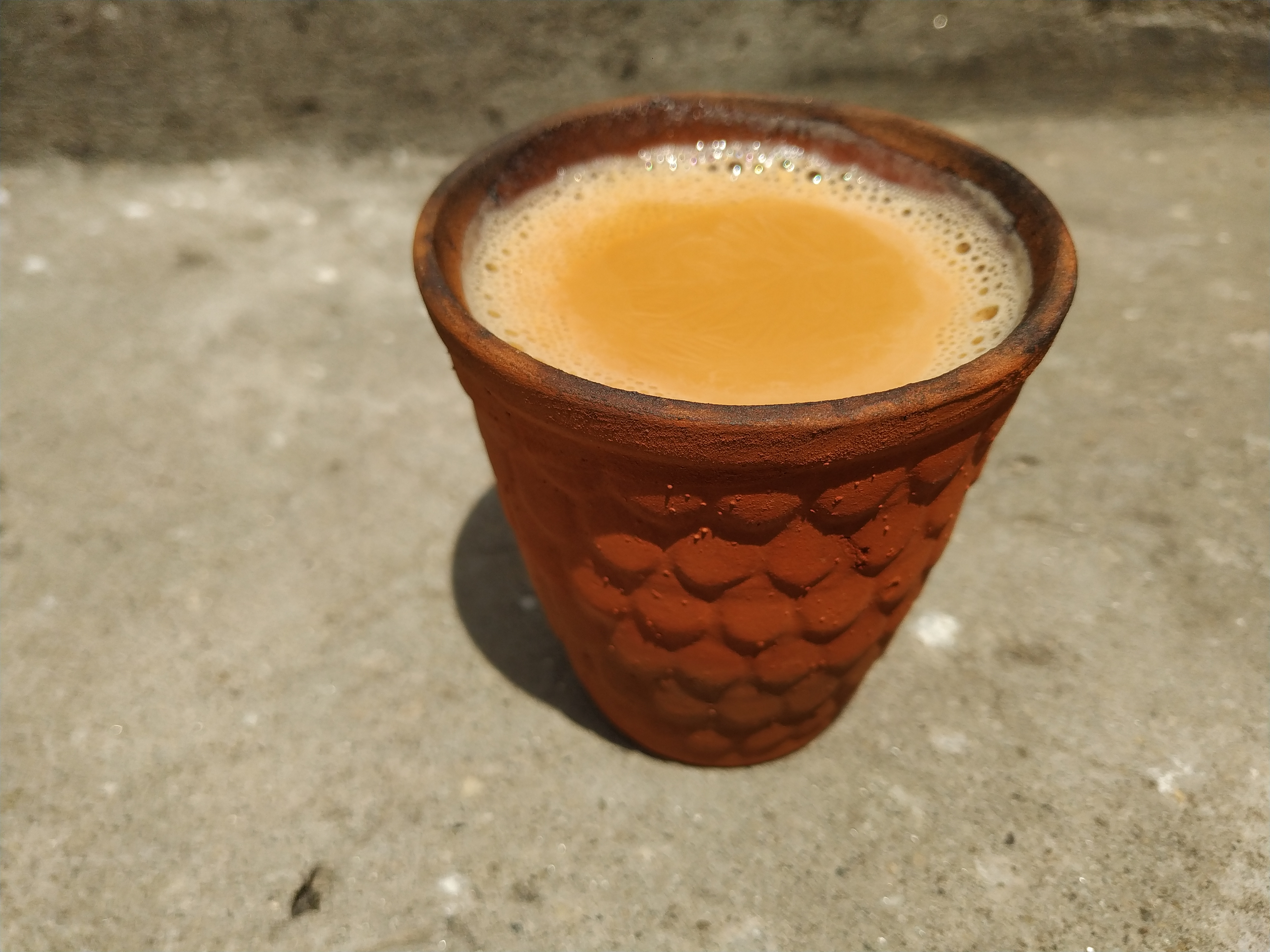
Tea served in a kulhar

A kulhar (Hindi: कुल्हड़ and Urdu: کلہڑ) or kulhad, matir bhar (Bengali: মাটির ভাঁড়) or simply bhar (ভাঁড়), sometimes called a shikora, is a traditional handleless pottery cup from South Asia that is typically undecorated and unglazed, and is meant to be disposable. Kulhars are almost never reused.

Bazaars and food stalls in the Indian subcontinent traditionally served hot beverages such as tea in kuhlars, which suffused the beverage with an "earthy aroma" that was often considered appealing. Yoghurt and hot milk with sugar, as well as some regional desserts such as kulfi (traditional ice-cream), are also served in kulhars. Kulhars have gradually been replaced by polystyrene and coated paper cups, because the latter are cheaper and lighter to carry in bulk.

== Possible origins ==
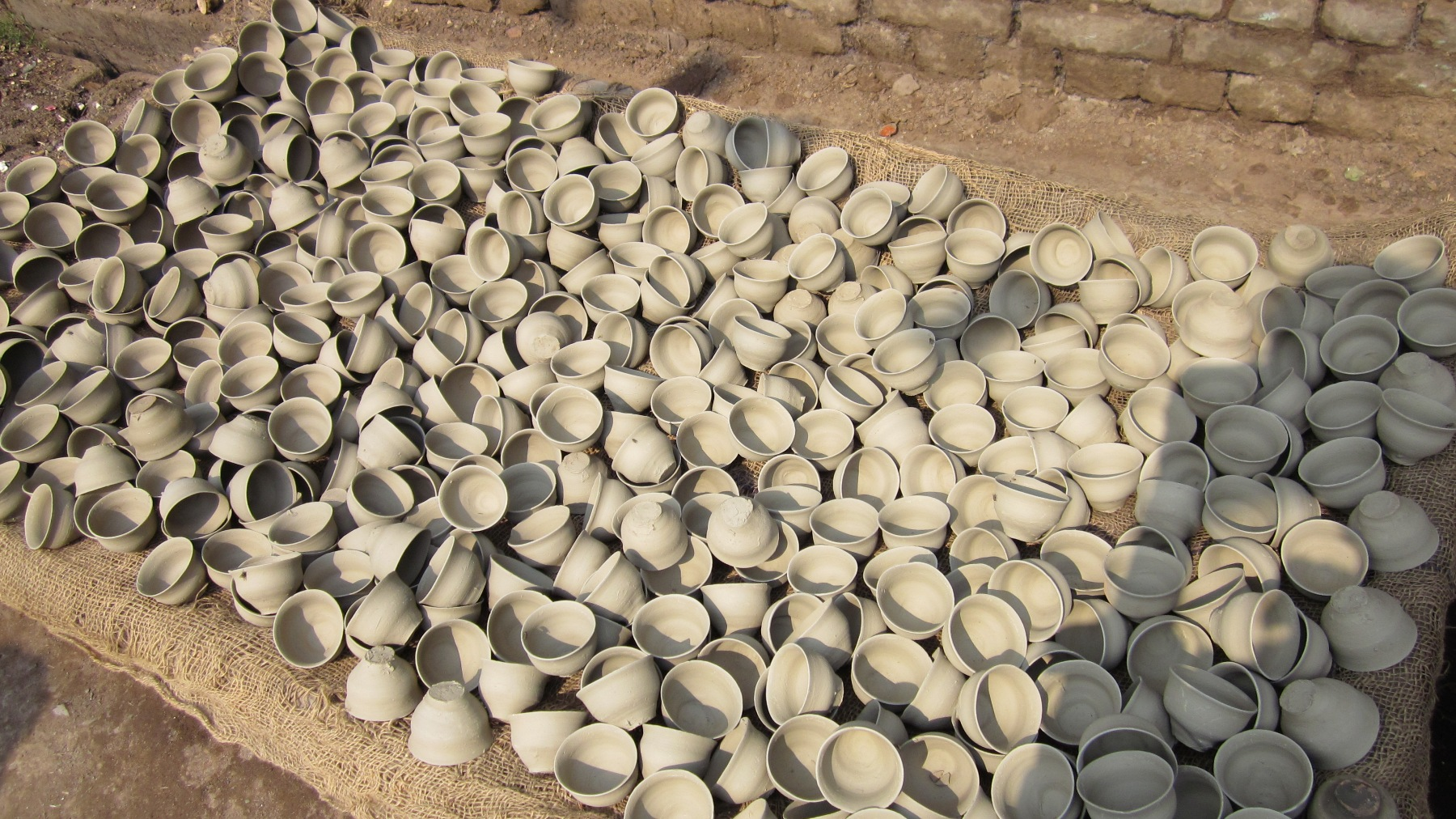
Unfired kulhar at manufacturing site in rural India

Kulhars may have been in use in the region for the past 5,000 years, since the Indus Valley Civilisation.

== Effects on taste ==
Since kulhars are unglazed, a hot drink such as tea partially soaks into the interior wall of the kulhar in which it is being served. This has an enhancing effect on the beverage's taste and fragrance, which is sometimes described as "earthy" (सौंधी ख़ुशबू, sondhi khushboo). Although kulhars have been losing ground to synthetic cups for cost and efficiency reasons, high-end restaurants often serve kulhar-waali chai (tea in kulhars) to their customers.

== Revival efforts by Indian Railways and criticism ==
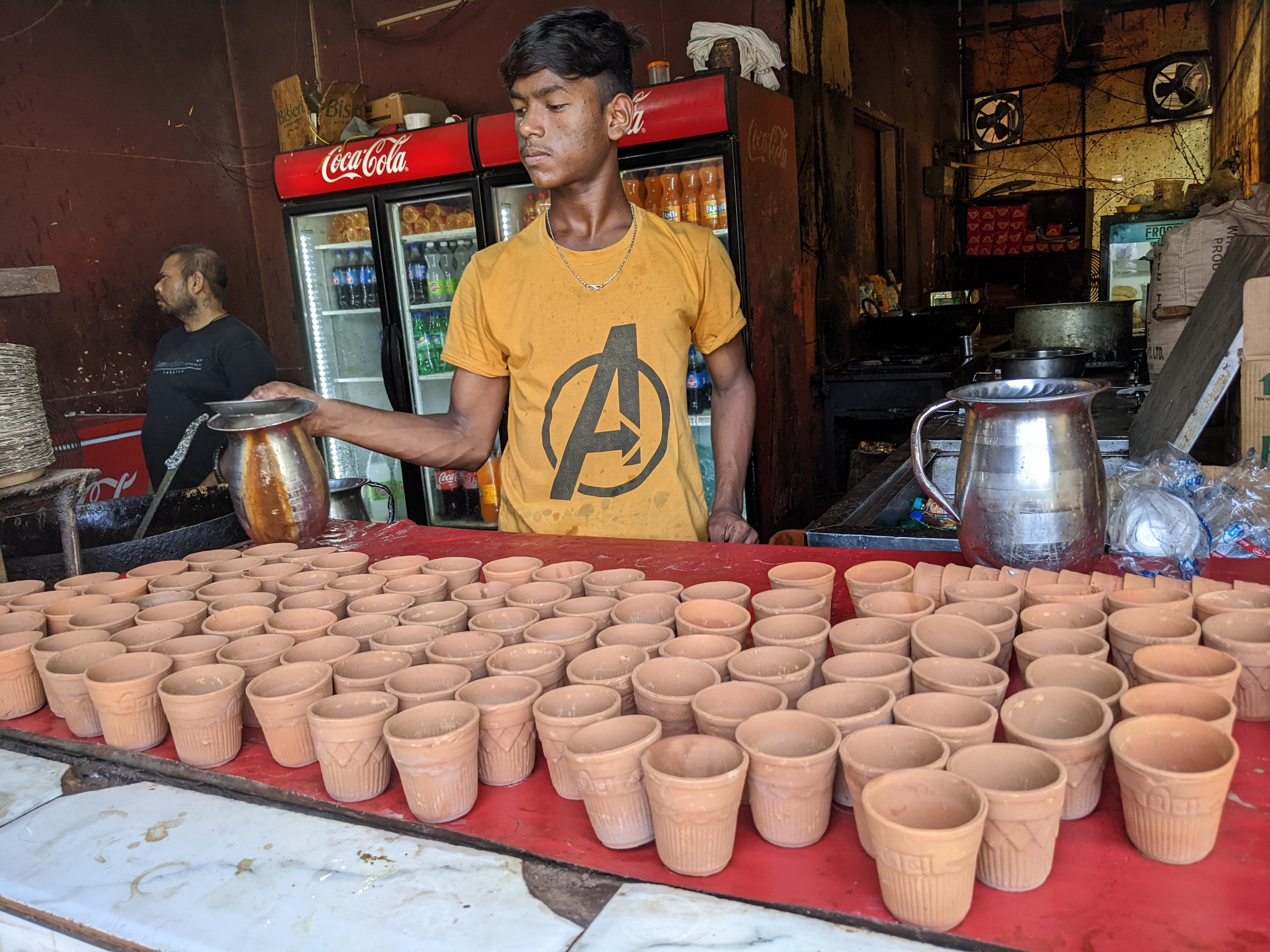
Pouring tea into kulhars (Alawalpur, Uttar Pradesh, 2022)

In 2004, Indian Railways (then under the leadership of minister Laloo Prasad Yadav) attempted to revive the use of kulhars for tea and other beverages sold at railway stations and aboard trains. It was argued that this was more hygienic than plastic, and also more environmentally friendly because kulhars are made exclusively from clay. It was also assumed that, since kulhars are manufactured by small businesses, this would assist in boosting rural employment.

Critics countered that the railways would need to dispose of about 1.8 billion kulhars a year, which would mean heavy fuel consumption in the kilns with associated pollution. Kulhars were claimed to take up to a decade to degrade; however, the discovery of thousands-of-years-old shards from Indus Valley ruins was used as evidence to challenge both that assertion and the one that they are environmentally superior. Fears were also expressed that a kulhar revival might result in topsoil depletion at the rate of 100 acres (0.40 km^{2}) per state per day, and that the economic gains to rural artisans would be minimal.

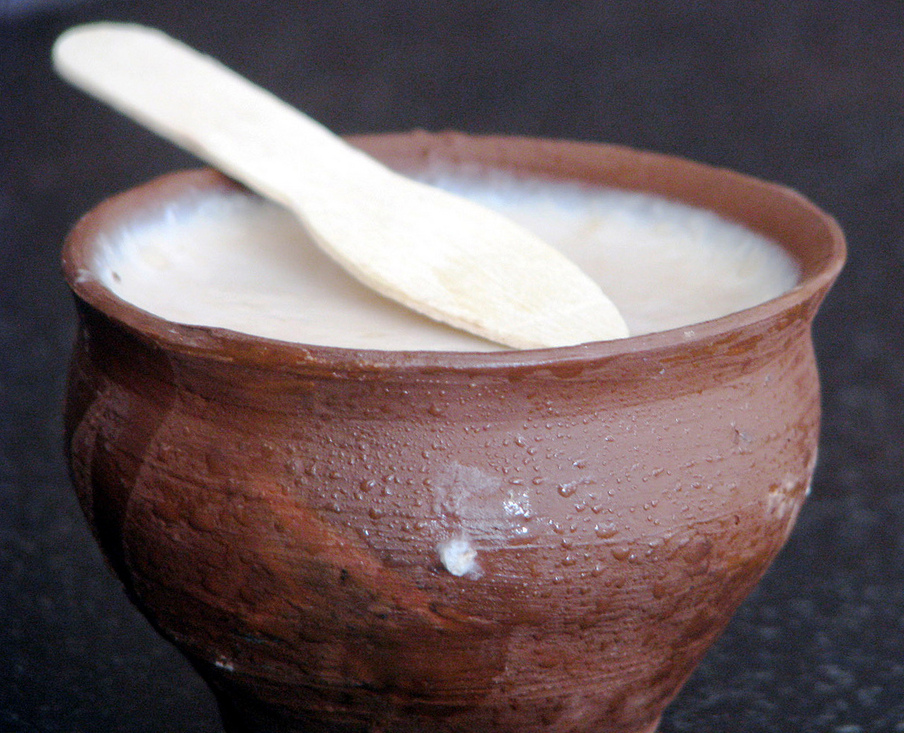
Kulhar containing dahi (curd)

Although alternatives to topsoil are available and kulhars can be made at lower temperatures to save fuel and make them more rapidly degradable, by 2008 the effort to revive kulhar use on railways was considered a failure, with the continuing widespread use of plastic and coated-paper cups. The primary reasons were the weight of kulhars and the higher per-unit cost. One estimate claimed procurement costs to be 140 paisas per kulhar and 7–10 paisas for coated-paper cups. There were also some vendor complaints that, because kulhars absorb liquids to some extent, buyers have to be given more tea per serving in a kulhar than in a disposable plastic cup.

== See also ==
- Matki
- Mashk
