= Zee Cine Award for Lifetime Achievement =

Film award in India

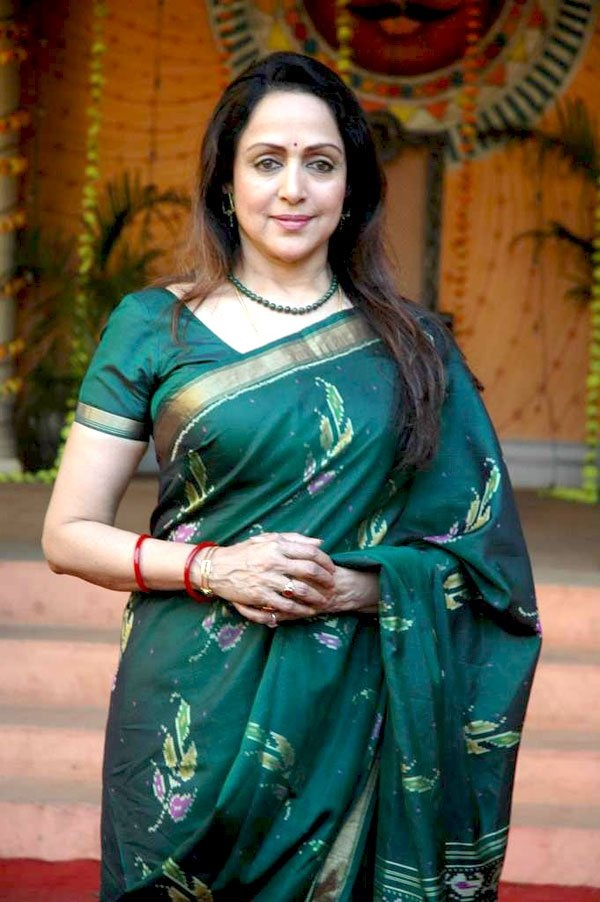
- The 2019 recipient: Hema Malini
- Awarded for: Commemorating an artist's career
- Country: India
- Presented by: Zee Entertainment Enterprises
- First award: Dilip Kumar (1998)
- Currently held by: Hema Malini (2019)
- Website: Zee Cine Awards

The Zee Cine Award for Lifetime Achievement is given to someone who is at the verge of retiring from films and it is to commemorate his/her career at the limelight.

== List of Honourees ==
The respected people are listed below:-

Year	Winner(s)
2021	Hema Malini
2019	Hema Malini
2016-18	No Award
2015	No Ceremony
2013-14	No Award
2012	Jeetendra
2011	Shatrughan Sinha
2009-10	No Ceremony
2008	Zeenat Aman & Feroz Khan
2007	Vinod Khanna
2006	Rekha & Rishi Kapoor
2005	Dharmendra
2004	Amitabh Bachchan & Yash Johar
2003	Hema Malini
2002	Shakti Samanta
2001	Sunil Dutt, Vijay Anand & Rajesh Khanna
2000	Pran, Mukhram Sharma & Nasir Hussain
1999	Manna Dey & Lata Mangeshkar
1998	Dilip Kumar

== See also ==
- Zee Cine Awards
- Bollywood
- Cinema of India
