= Rangila Ratan =

- Directed by: S. Ramanathan
- Produced by: Ratan Khatri
- Starring: Rishi Kapoor; Parveen Babi
- Cinematography: Kaygee
- Music by: Kalyanji Anandji
- Release date: 17 July 1976 (India)
- Country: India
- Language: Hindi

Rangila Ratan is a 1976 Bollywood action film directed by S. Ramanathan and presented and produced by Ratan Khatri and RB Films. It starred Rishi Kapoor, Parveen Babi and Ashok Kumar in lead roles.

== Plot ==
After Govt. Lawyer Dinanath Sharma (Ashok Kumar) proposes the death sentence on the basis of him being the legal age of 21, regarding Laxman Das' son due to a murder committed by him, he kidnaps Dinanath's son, Gopal, at a function attended by Sharma and his family.

He raises Gopal in an environment of crime, naming him Kishan (Rishi Kapoor), with the plan of Dinanath to kill his son when he reaches the age of 21 himself. However, after a scuffle to protect Chamki (Rama Prabha) from the goon, Nandu, Kishan ends up at the clinic of Dr. Anand (Shreeram Lagoo)—who disapproves of his way of life and urges him to reform for the better.

Kishan runs away from home with the help of Chamki; whilst running away from his father, Laxman Dada, he finds protection in Dr. Anand's clinic once again, where his blind grandmother mistakes him for Anand's dead, young son, Ratan. For the sake of Anand's blind mother, he must take on the identity of Ratan.

Will he manage to begin a new life with his love, Madhu (Parveen Babi)? Or will his past continue to haunt him? Will Laxman Das succeed?

== Cast ==
- Rishi Kapoor as Ratan/Kishan/Gopal
- Parveen Babi as Madhu
- Ashok Kumar as Govt. Lawyer Dinanath Sharma
- Ajit as Laxman Dada
- Rama Prabha as Chamki
- Shreeram Lagoo as Dr. Anand
- Narendra Nath as Nandu
- Shashi Kiran as Shekhar
- Jagdish Raj
- Jeevan
- Durga Khote as Dadi Ma
- Sunder
- Shyama
- Manorama
- Tun Tun as Fat Girl before ("Rangeela Hoon Main Dil Ka")
- Keshto Mukherji as Keshto
- Pinchoo Kapoor as Madhu's father
- Ratan Khatri as Himself

== Soundtrack ==
All lyrics are written by Gulshan Bawra and all music is composed by Kalyanji Anandji.

1	"Dholi Dhol Zor Se Baja"	Kishore Kumar, Baban Lal Yadav
2	"Lakhon Chole Tu Ne Badle"	Mukesh
3	"Rangilla Hoon Main Dil Ka"	Shailendra Singh
4	"Tera Mera Mera Tera"	Kishore Kumar, Asha Bhosle
5	"Tumhin Ho Tumhin Ho Jane-Jaan"	Kishore Kumar, Lata Mangeshkar
