= Ghar Ki Laaj (1960 film) =

Ghar Ki Laj
- Directed by: V. M. Vyas
- Starring: Feroz Khan; Nirupa Roy
- Music by: Ravi; Rajendra Krishan (lyrics)
- Release date: 1960
- Language: Hindi

Ghar Ki Laj is a 1960 Hindi film starring Feroz Khan, Nirupa Roy in lead roles. It was directed by V. M. Vyas.

== Cast ==
- Feroz Khan as Suresh
- Nirupa Roy as Ranjana
- Kumkum as Shobha Rai
- Sohrab Modi as Judge
- Johnny Walker as Babulal
- Sheila Kashmiri as Hansa
- Reeta Roy as Reeta
- Indira Bansal as Gulab
- Madan Puri as Gulab's his
- Zeb Rehman
- Chand Burke
- Amir Ali as Ramdhan

== Soundtrack ==
Song	Singer
"Le Lo Chudiyan"	Mohammed Rafi
"Laila Ki Ungliyan"	Mohammed Rafi
"Ujad Gaya Panchhi Ab"	Mohammed Rafi
"Lal Batti Ka Nishan, Neeche Pan Ki Dukan"	Mohammed Rafi, Asha Bhosle
"Teri Latka Laga Hai Latka, Hai Saans Gale Mein Atka"	Mohammed Rafi, Asha Bhosle
"Aata Hai To Aane Do"	Asha Bhosle
"Gham Denewale"	Asha Bhosle
