= Suhagan (1964 film) =

- Directed by: K. S. Gopalakrishnan
- Produced by: A. L. Srinivasan
- Starring: Guru Dutt; Mala Sinha; Feroz Khan
- Music by: Madan Mohan
- Release date: 1964
- Country: India
- Language: Hindi

Suhagan is a 1964 Indian Hindi-language film directed by K. S. Gopalakrishnan. Its music was composed by Madan Mohan. The cast includes Guru Dutt, Mala Sinha, Feroz Khan, Deven Verma, Om Prakash, Nazir Hussain, Leela Chitnis and David.

Suhagan was released after Dutt's death in October 1964.

== Cast ==
- Guru Dutt as Vijay Kumar
- Mala Sinha as Sharda Dubey
- Feroz Khan as Shankar
- Deven Verma as Sukhiram
- Om Prakash as Dukhiram
- Nazir Hussain as Dubey
- Leela Chitnis as Vijay's Mother
- David as Arts College Professor

== Songs ==
Song	Singer
"Ek Baat Poochhti Hoon"	Lata Mangeshkar
"Tum Hi To Meri Pooja Ho Tumhe Dil Mein Basaya"	Lata Mangeshkar, Talat Mahmood
"Bheegi Chandni Chhayi Bekhudi"	Lata Mangeshkar, Manna Dey
"Mere Pyar Mein Tujhe"	Mohammed Rafi
"Tu Mere Samne Hai"	Mohammed Rafi
"Aayi Hai Dulhan"	Asha Bhosle
