= Bombay Cotton Exchange =

Indian commodities exchange

The Bombay Cotton Exchange was a commodities exchange that operated in Bombay (now Mumbai), India. In 1875, the Bombay Cotton Trade Association began selling futures, but disagreements between cotton mill owners and merchants led to the 1893 creation of the Bombay Cotton Exchange as a rival organization.

The gambling game Satta Matka was created at the Bombay Cotton Exchange. Players would guess between one and three of the final digits of either the opening or closing price of cotton commodities as they were transmitted from the New York Cotton Exchange to the Bombay Cotton Exchange. Players who correctly guessed additional digits of the commodity prices would receive larger payouts. Modern variants of Satta Matka rely on similar methods of random number generation.

In 1900, the Gujarati Vyapari Mandali (tl. Gujarati Association of Merchants) was established in the neighboring state of Gujarat, pioneering futures trading of agricultural commodities. As other exchanges for options and futures trading of various commodities spread across India during the 20th century, the Indian government felt the need to establish a centralized exchange for risk management. Thus, the Multi Commodity Exchange was founded in November 2003 to succeed all local and state commodity exchanges.
