= Yalgaar =

1992 Indian Hindi action crime thriller film by Feroz Khan

- Directed by: Feroz Khan
- Written by: Rajiv Kaul; Praful Parekh; Feroz Khan; Dialogue: Kamlesh Pandey
- Produced by: Feroz Khan
- Starring: Feroz Khan; Sanjay Dutt; Kabir Bedi; Manisha Koirala; Nagma; Mukesh Khanna; Vicky Arora
- Cinematography: S. M. Anwar
- Edited by: Feroz Khan
- Music by: Channi Singh (songs); Viju Shah (score)
- Release date: 23 October 1992
- Running time: 192 minutes
- Country: India
- Language: Hindi

Yalgaar is a 1992 Indian Hindi-language crime action-thriller film directed by Feroz Khan. The film stars Khan himself, Sanjay Dutt, Kabir Bedi, Nagma, Manisha Koirala, Vicky Arora, Mukesh Khanna, Deepti Naval and Neena Gupta. The film revolves around an enmity between two childhood friends who take different paths in life, and how they react when their children fall in love with each other.

Yalgaar released worldwide on 23 October 1992, coinciding with the Diwali festival, clashing with Jigar starring Ajay Devgn. Upon release the film received mixed reviews from critics, who praised the performances of Dutt, Bedi and Nagma, the music and the action sequences, while criticising the length and Khanna playing Khan's father, despite a large age difference. Commercially, the film was the 9th highest-grossing film of 1992. The film did average business in India and was a moderate success in overseas. it remade as Dil Mein Chupa Kay Rakhna (1999) in Pakistan.

== Plot ==
Childhood friends become enemies when one of them, Mahendra Ashwini Kumar becomes Additional Commissioner of Police and the other Raj Pratap Singhal becomes a smuggler. Mahendra has two sons – Rajesh and Brajesh who are also police officers. While on the other hand Raj also has two sons;- Vishal who helps in developing his father's business and Vicky who finds employment in a garage. When one of Singhal's goons murders Brajesh, Rajesh swears to avenge his brother's death. Even if for this he has to take the law into his own hands. After Brajesh's death, he is left alone with his widowed wife Kaushalya and a daughter Meghna. Meghna and Vicky meet each other and fall in love. Kumar, unaware of Vicky's family background, gives his consent. Mahendra is then promoted as Police Commissioner. Singhal is unable to bear this and sends another of his goons to murder Mahendra. Raj moves to Dubai with his wife, son, daughter-in-law Anu to escape the police and government officials. He has also kidnapped Meghna to ensure his safety from Rajesh's wrath. Meghna learns that Vicky is actually Raj's second son and has now started showing his true colours.

== Cast ==
- Feroz Khan - Rajesh Ashwini Kumar
- Sanjay Dutt - Vishal Singhal, Anu's husband
- Kabir Bedi - Raj Pratap Singhal
- Manisha Koirala - Meghna Kumar
- Nagma - Anu Singhal, Vishal's wife
- Mukesh Khanna - Mahendra Ashwini Kumar
- Vicky Arora - Vicky Malhotra / Singhal
- Vishwajit Pradhan - Jaichand
- Deepti Naval - Sunita
- Maya Alagh - Bharti Singhal
- Neena Gupta - Kaushalya Kumar

== Music ==
This album was very popular, Most popular songs in album "Ho Jaata Hai Kaise Pyar", "Aakhir Tumhein Aana Hai" etc. According to the Indian trade website Box Office India, with around 15,00,000 units sold the soundtrack became the fourteenth highest-selling album of the year.

All lyrics are written by Sudarshan Faakir and Aziz Qaisi; all music is composed by Channi Singh.

No.	Title	Singer(s) and Artist(s)	Length
1.	"Aakhir Tumhein Aana Hai"	Udit Narayan and Sapna Mukherjee and Sanjay Dutt and Nagma (Talking Only)	4:59
2.	"Ho Jaata Hai Kaise Pyar"	Kumar Sanu and Sapna Mukherjee	5:39
3.	"Koi Pichle Janam Kiye"	Udit Narayan and Kavita Krishnamurthy	4:52
4.	"Teri Chunni Pe Sitare"	Udit Narayan and Kavita Krishnamurthy	6:42
5.	"Dil Dil Dil"	Channi Singh and Sapna Mukherjee	5:09
6.	"Kaun Si Baat Hai"	Udit Narayan and Kavita Krishnamurthy	5:52
7.	"Sheher Mein Gaon Mein"	Kumar Sanu	5:13
8.	"Hai Dil Mein Lagan"	Mohammed Aziz, Nitin Mukesh and Suresh Wadkar	6:58
Total length:			45:14

== Release ==
Release, planned for 1987, had to be postponed due to Khan's mother death that year.

== Reception ==
Iqbal Masood, writing for The Indian Express, panned the film as disappointing. In his book about Sanjay Dutt, Yaseer Usman called the film "terrible and eminently forgettable", and stated that the director had kept the best parts of this big-venture budget for himself.
