= Multi Commodity Exchange =

Indian commodity exchange in Mumbai

Multi Commodity Exchange of India Limited
- Company type: Public
- Traded as: BSE: 534091; NSE: MCX
- ISIN: INE745G01035
- Industry: Commodity Exchange
- Founded: 10 November 2003; 22 years ago
- Headquarters: Mumbai, Maharashtra, India
- Key people: Praveena Rai (MD & CEO)
- Products: Commodity derivatives
- Website: www.mcxindia.com

Multi Commodity Exchange of India Limited, also known as the Multi Commodity Exchange of India (MCX), is an Indian commodity exchange. It was established in 2003 and is currently based in Mumbai. It is India's largest commodity derivatives exchange. The average daily turnover of commodity futures contracts increased by 26% to ₹32,424 crore during FY2019-20, as against ₹25,648 crore in FY2018-19. The total turnover of commodity futures traded on the Exchange stood at ₹83.98 lakh crore in FY2019-20. MCX offers options trading in gold and futures trading in non-ferrous metals, bullions, oil, natural gas, and agricultural commodities (e.g., mentha oil, cardamom, palm oil, and cotton).

MCX was among the top global commodity exchanges in terms of the number of futures contracts trade, the latest yearly data from Futures Industry Association (FIA) showed. MCX launched the MCX India Commodity Indices (MCX iCOMDEX) series on 20 December 2019, which conform to the global best practices set by the International Organisation of Securities Commissions (IOSCO). iCOMDEX series consists of iCOMDEX Composite, iCOMDEX Base Metals, iCOMDEX Bullion, iCOMDEX Gold, iCOMDEX Copper and iCOMDEX Crude Oil. Subsequently, MCX received regulatory approval for launch of futures contracts on MCX iCOMDEX Bullion and Base Metal indices. The exchange also set up a web-based application "ComRIS" (Commodity Receipts Information System) in order to maintain an electronic record of commodities deposited at the Exchange accredited warehouses and ensure flow of real time information from the warehouses.

SEBI issued operational guidelines for participation of Mutual Funds and Portfolio Managers in commodity derivatives in May 2019 and subsequently, approved few custodial service providers as custodians in the commodity space.

In February 2012, MCX held its initial public offering, offering 6.5 million shares and raising $134 million in funds for the company, making the company India's only publicly listed exchange.

From 28 September 2015, MCX is being regulated by the Securities and Exchange Board of India (SEBI). Earlier MCX was regulated by the Forward Markets Commission (FMC), which got merged with the SEBI on 28 September 2015.

In May 2019, Padala Subbi Reddy was hired as Managing Director and CEO, having previously served in those positions at Central Depository Services, an Indian depository for securities.

The efforts that started in the fourth quarter of FY 2018–19 to migrate to 'Compulsory Delivery-based' contracts in all base metals were successfully completed in FY 2019–20. The launch of indigenously benchmarked deliverable futures contracts of Copper, Aluminium, Zinc, Lead and Nickel on MCX, has led to the Indian market prices for metals to be discovered on an exchange platform in a transparent manner. This fulfills an important step towards development of domestic benchmarks which reflect domestic market fundamentals, while the delivery standards are in tune with international standards.

Paving the way for introduction of Options with 'commodities' as underlying, the Government of India issued a notification on 18 October 2019, which widens the scope of commodity derivatives traded in recognised exchanges. Following this, SEBI permitted stock exchanges to launch 'Option in goods' in their commodity derivatives segment, in addition to existing 'options on commodity futures'. MCX has launched Gold Mini Options with Gold Mini (100 grams) bar as the underlying, and plans to launch Silver Mini 5 kg 'option in goods' contract soon.

In April 2022, the MCX collaborated with the Chittagong Stock Exchange, (CSE), to establish Bangladesh's first commodity exchange.

MCX also provides live feeds for all traded commodities and these are published on various websites like MoneyControl, GoldSilverReports and Economic Times.

== See also ==
- India International Bullion Exchange
- Bombay Cotton Exchange
