= Kulfi =

South Asian frozen dessert

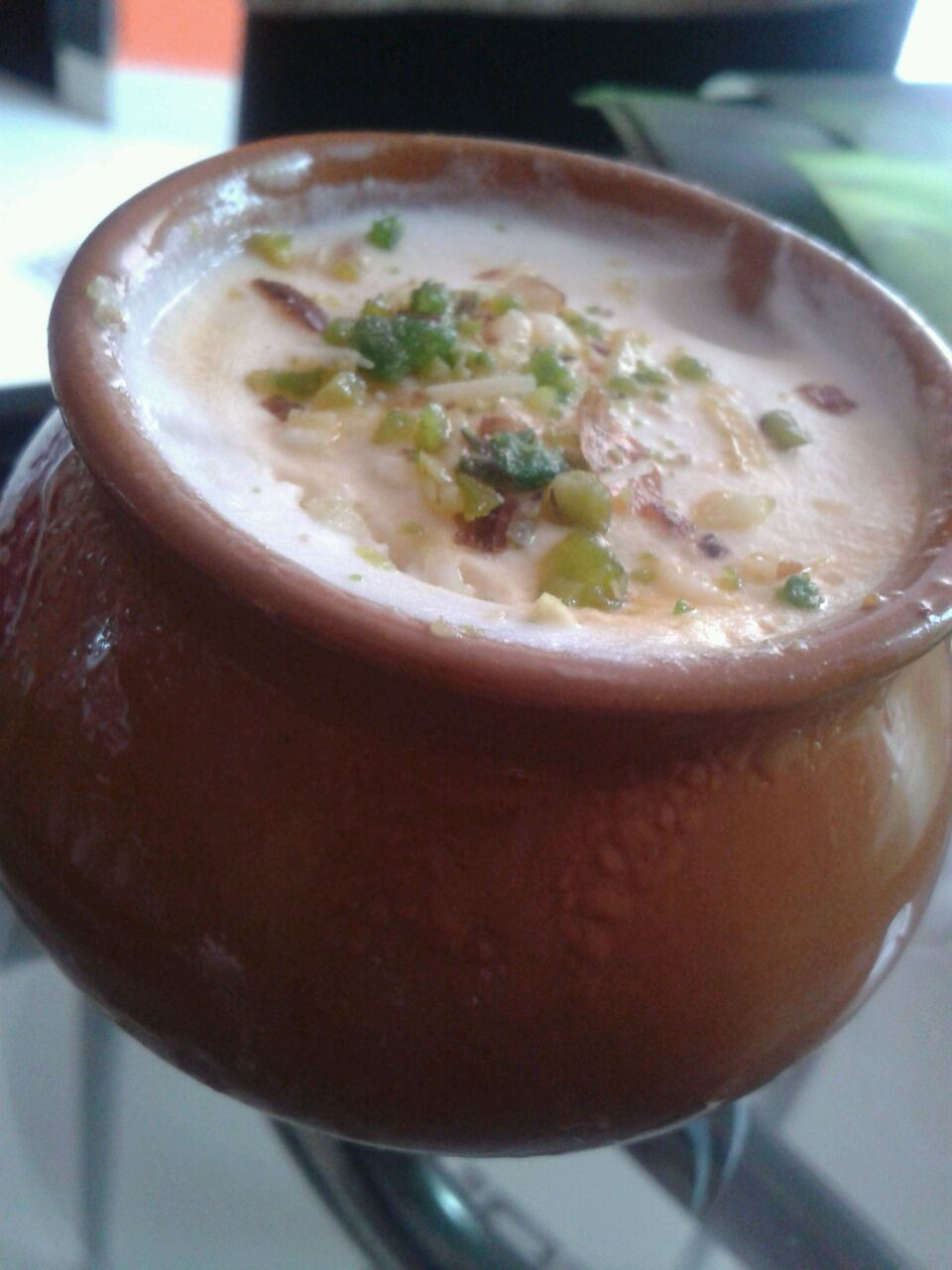
- Kulfi in a matka
- Type: Ice cream
- Course: Dessert
- Place of origin: South Asia
- Region or state: Delhi
- Associated cuisine: Indian; Pakistani; Bangladeshi
- Main ingredients: Milk; sugar

Kulfi (/kʊlfiː/) is a frozen dairy dessert from the Indian subcontinent. It is often described as "traditional Indian ice cream". Kulfi originated in 16th-century Delhi during the Mughal era.

Kulfi is denser and creamier than regular ice cream. It comes in various flavours, traditionally almond, cardamom (elaichi), mango, pistachio, and saffron. Unlike ice cream, kulfi is not churned while being frozen, producing a denser final product which is considered a distinct category of frozen dairy-based dessert. The density of kulfi causes it to melt more slowly than ice cream.

== History ==
The word kulfi comes from the Persian qulfi (قلفی) meaning "covered cup". The dessert originated in Delhi during the Mughal Empire in the 16th century. The mixture of dense evaporated milk was already popular in the sweet dishes in the Indian subcontinent. During the Mughal period, this mixture was flavoured with pistachios and saffron, packed into metal cones and immersed in slurry ice, resulting in the invention of kulfi. Ain-i-Akbari, a detailed record of the Mughal emperor Akbar's administration, mentions use of saltpeter for refrigeration as well as transportation of Himalayan ice to warmer areas.

Although Delhi has been described as the birthplace of kulfi, Australian food historian Charmaine O'Brien suggests "...it is likely that [kulfi] originally evolved in the cooler climates of Persia or Samarkand and that the Mughals appropriated the concept and elaborated on it to create the creamy, perfumed dessert that it now is."

== Preparation ==
To prepare kulfi, sweetened, flavoured milk is slow cooked. The milk is stirred almost continuously to prevent it from sticking to the cooking utensil. During this process, the milk condenses and thickens. The slow cooking caramelises the sugar in the mixture and browns its milk proteins, giving kulfi its distinctive taste. The mixture is then poured into moulds (often kulhars) and sealed. The sealed moulds are submerged in an insulated matka filled with ice and salt. This quickly freezes the mixture, giving it a soft, smooth consistency free of ice crystals. Kulfi prepared in this traditional way is called matka kulfi.

The moulds are removed from the freezer 10 to 15 minutes before serving to allow the outside of the kulfi to melt slightly for easy release. The kulfi is then removed from the moulds and garnished with ground cardamom, saffron, or pistachios. Kulfi may be served with falooda (vermicelli noodles).

== Retail sales ==
Throughout the Indian subcontinent, kulfi is sold by street vendors known as kulfiwallahs. It is also commonly served in Indian restaurants.

Dedicated kulfi shops also make and sell kulfi. According to The Times of India, Kuremal Mohan Lal Kulfi Wale (founded in 1906) in Old Delhi and Prakash Kulfi (established in 1956) in Lucknow are among the "legendary" kulfi shops in India.

Several manufacturers make kulfi for retail sales in supermarkets and for export. Vadilal is the world's top kulfi supplier, with 63% of global market share in 2024-2025. Bombay Kulfi is another leading exporter. Amul is a major player in the Indian market and makes a variety of kulfis.

== Gallery ==
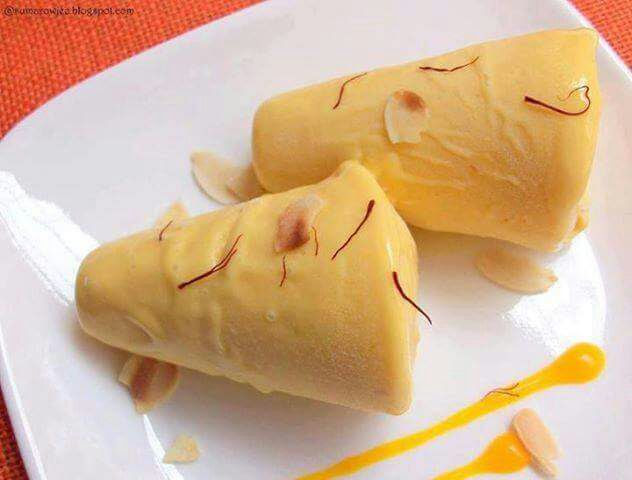
Saffron- and mango-flavoured kulfi

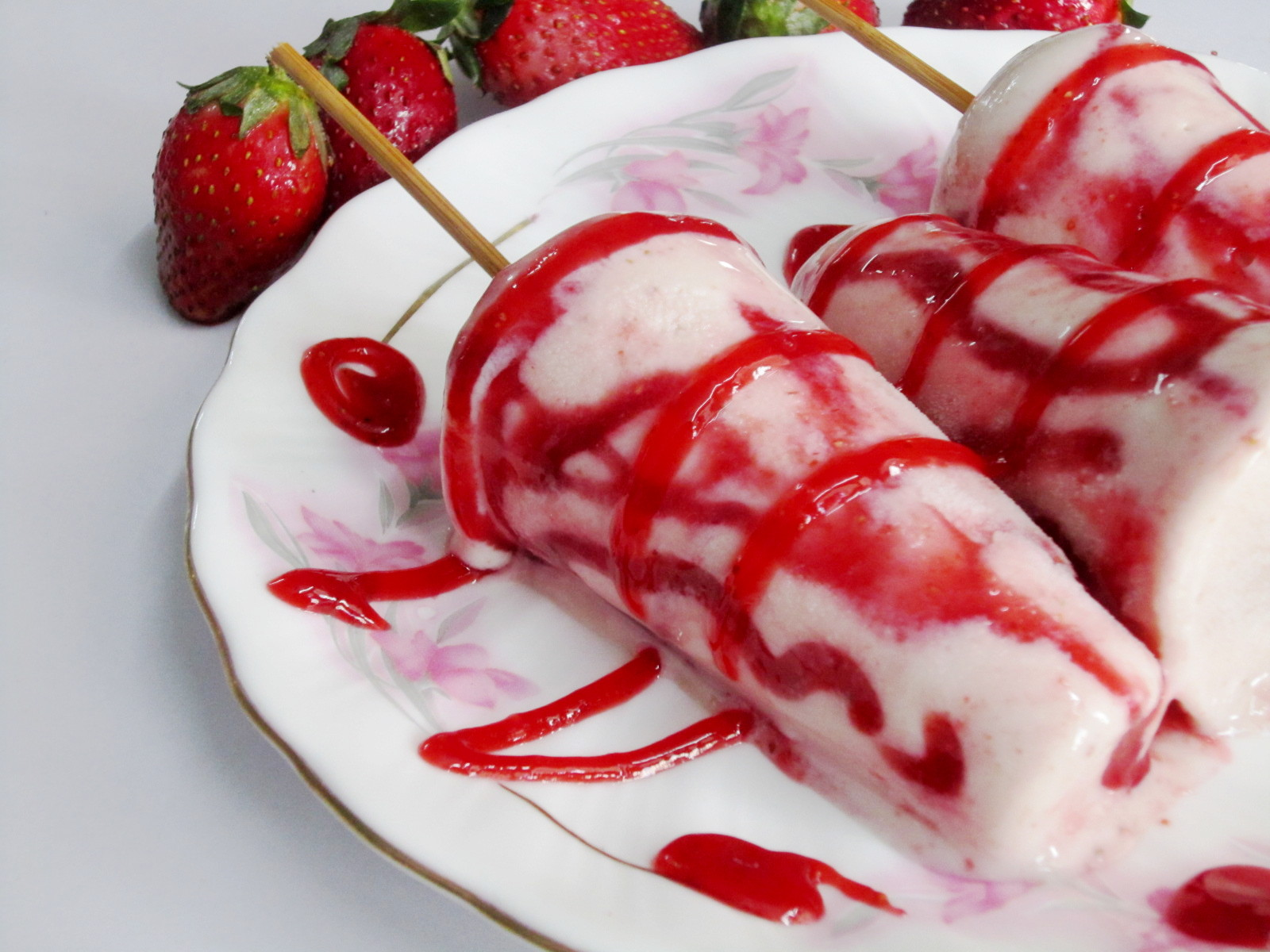
Kulfi with strawberry sauce

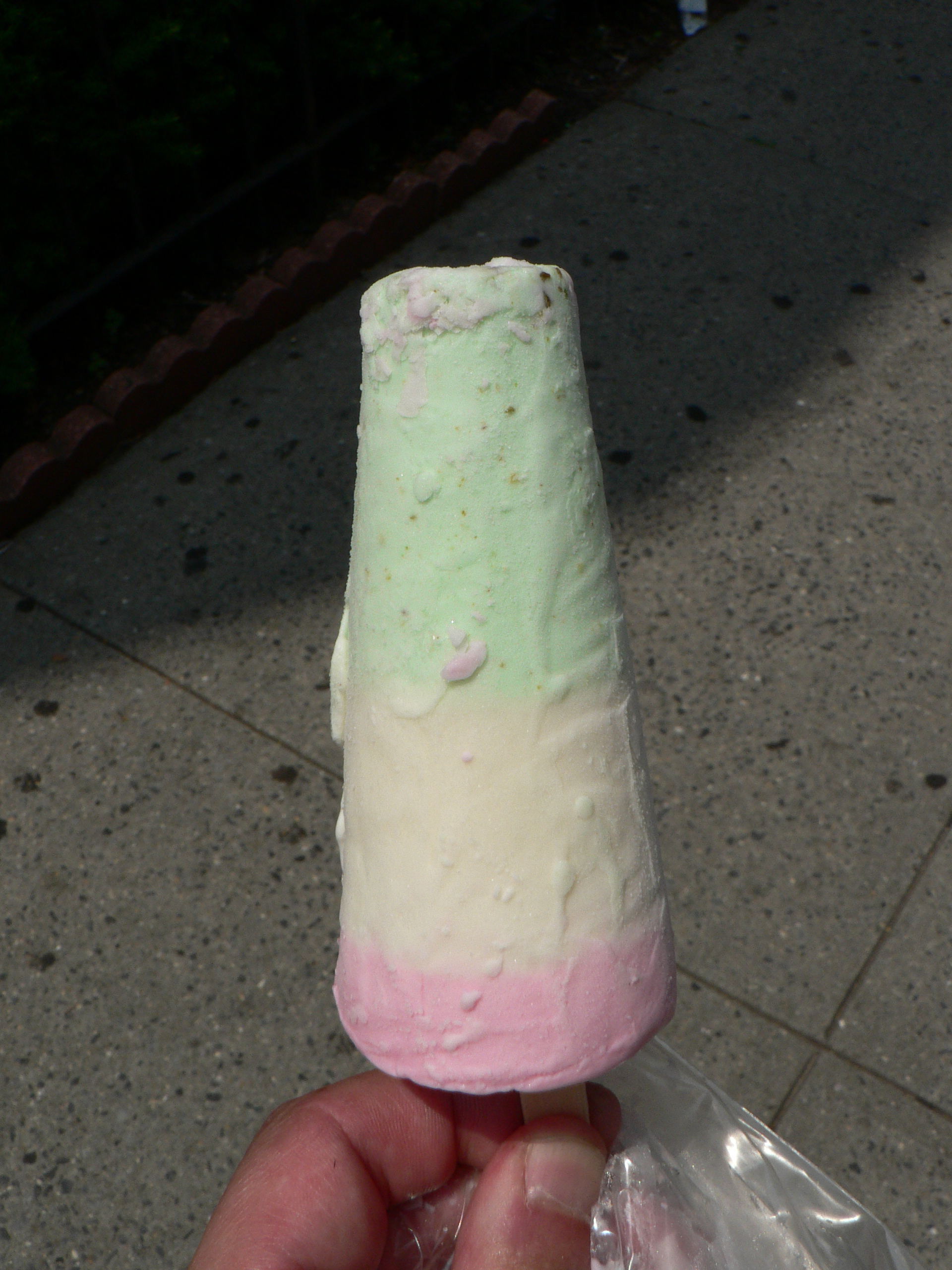
Pistachio, vanilla, and rose-flavoured kulfi

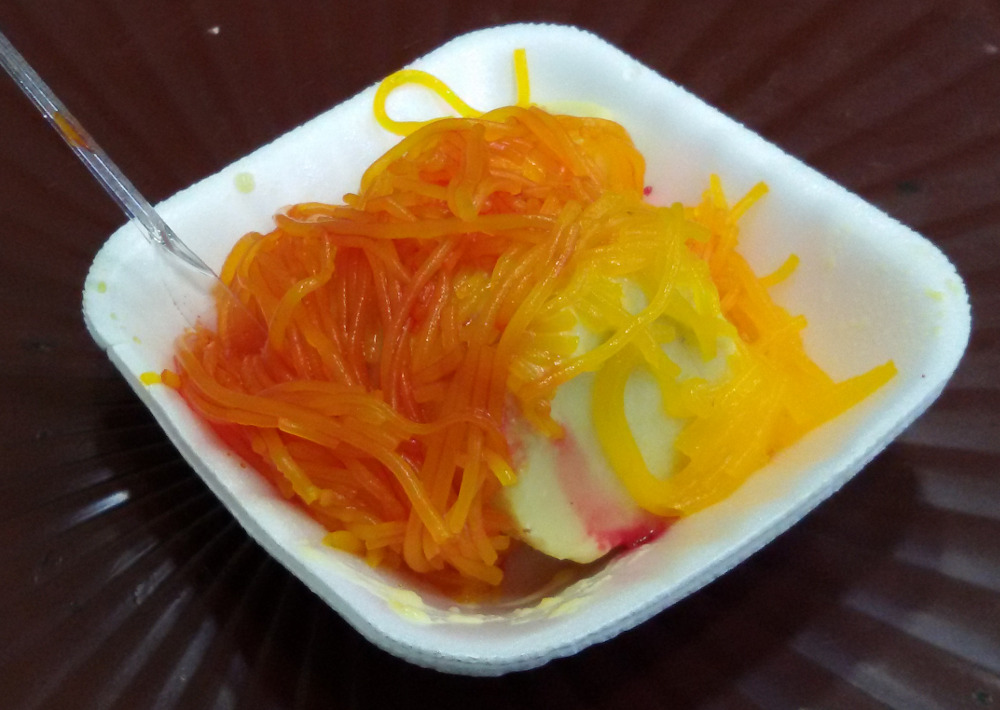
Kulfi with falooda (vermicelli noodles)

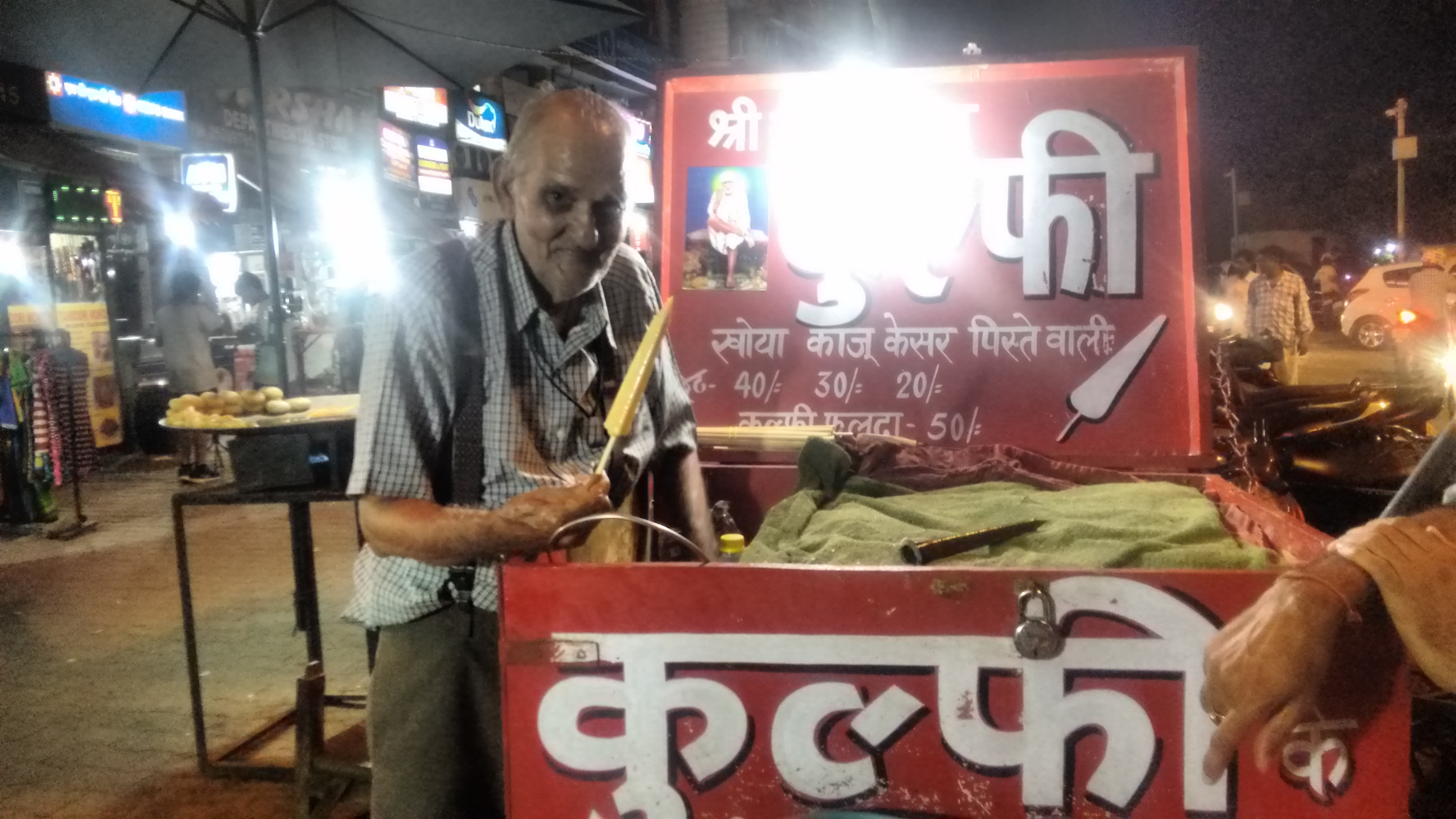
A vendor (kulfiwallah) selling kulfi in India

== See also ==
- The dictionary definition of kulfi at Wiktionary
