= Aziz Qaisi =

Urdu writer

Aziz Mohammad Khan (1931–1992) or Aziz Qaisi was an Urdu poet, short story writer, and film writer. He was born and educated in Hyderabad, Telangana. He started writing early and established himself as a poet and story writer. He moved to Mumbai in the late nineteen-fifties, and became an active part of Mumbai's literary and film scene. He was associated with a number of films, including Kunwara Baap, Ankur, and Dayavan. Early in his life, he became associated with the Progressive Writers' Movement, which had a presence in Hyderabad and Mumbai.

== Work and contribution ==
Aziz Qaisi started writing early, and by the mid-1950s had already written poetry and short stories. Although he is known primarily as a poet, he also wrote prose. His poems consists of both ghazals as well as nazms. He published three poetry collections. His works has been translated into other Indian languages as well as English. His poems and stories have been part of various important anthologies of Indian and Urdu literature. His contribution to contemporary Indian literature is significant. He is counted among the important poets who contributed significantly to Urdu poetry after 1947 and introduced new trends.

== Filmography ==
- Dushman Duniya Ka (1996) (dialogue) (screenplay) (story),
- Indrajeet (1991) (screenplay),
- Dayavan (1988) (dialogue), (Lyrics),
- Apne Apne (1987) (script)
- Sarkari Mehmaan(1978)(dialogue)
- Oonch neech Beech
- Pyaar Bana Afsana
- Kunwara Baap (1974) (written by)
- Rakhi Aur Hathkadi (1972) (Screenplay)
- Bansi Birju (1972) (dialogue) (screenplay) (story)
- Ankur (1974)
- Rakhi Aur Hathkadi (1972) (screenplay)
