= Shankar Shambhu =

1976 film

- Directed by: Chand
- Written by: K. B. Pathak
- Produced by: A.K Nadiadwala
- Starring: Feroz Khan; Vinod Khanna; Sulakshana Pandit; Bindu Desai; Ajit
- Music by: Kalyanji-Anandji
- Release date: 8 March 1976
- Country: India
- Language: Hindi

Shankar Shambhu is a 1976 Bollywood action film starring Feroz Khan, Vinod Khanna and Sulakshana Pandit in the lead roles. It is directed by Chand and produced by A. K. Nadiadwala.

== Plot ==
Inspector Ranjit Singh lives a middle-classed lifestyle along with his wife, Laxmi, a son, Pappu, and daughter, Pinky. When the National Bank is broken into one night, he gives chase to the robbers, and shoots one of them dead. The dead robber's brother, Kundan, manages to get away with the loot, then tracks down Ranjit and his family, shoots at them, forcing their jeep to fall into the Narbada river, separating the entire family. Ranjit manages to rescue Laxmi, and then apprehends Kundan, has him tried in Court, and sentenced to jail for several years, but is unable to recover the stolen loot. Years later, Kundan gets discharged and is received by his nephew, Chaman. Ranjit is now the Inspector General of Police, and Laxmi still hopes to be reunited with her children. Pappu has been adopted by a bandit named Lakhan Singh, who re-names him Shambhu, and brings him up with his other son, Shankar. Pinky has been adopted by a widow, who has re-named her Sulakshana, who makes a living as a petty thief. Shankar and Shambhu, on the run from the Police, end up in Bombay, where they will be thrust into conflict with Kundan and Chaman on the one hand, and Ranjit Singh on the other.

== Cast ==
- Feroz Khan as Shankar Singh "Bade Thakur"
- Vinod Khanna as Pappu Singh / Shambhu Singh "Chhote Thakur"
- Sulakshana Pandit as Pinky Singh / Sulakshana "Sulu"
- Bindu as Munni Bai
- Ajit as Inspector / I.G.P. Ranjeet Singh
- Sulochana Latkar as Laxmi Singh
- Bhagwan as Constable Dhondu
- Jagdeep as Constable Naik
- Lalita Pawar as Pinky's Foster Mother
- Pradeep Kumar as Lakhan Singh
- Anwar Hussain as Kundan
- Kundan as Kundan's Brother
- Viju Khote as Kundan's Goon
- Sudhir as Chaman
- Jayshree T. as Courtesan from Jaunpur

== Songs ==
All songs are written by Sahir Ludhianvi and music by Kalyanji-Anandji.

Song	Singer
"Yeh Duniya Hai Naqli Chehron Ka Mela"	Kishore Kumar, Mahendra Kapoor, Sulakshana Pandit
"Mera Dil Churakar"	Suman Kalyanpur
"Agar Nibhane Ki Himmat"	Asha Bhosle
"Bheege Hue Jalwon Par Aise Na Nazar Dalo"	Asha Bhosle, Mohammed Rafi
"Hum Lootne Aaye Hain, Hum Lootke Jayenge"	Jaani Babu Qawwal, Aziz Nazan
