= Matki (earthen pot) =

Receptacle for keeping stored water cool, used in the Indian subcontinent

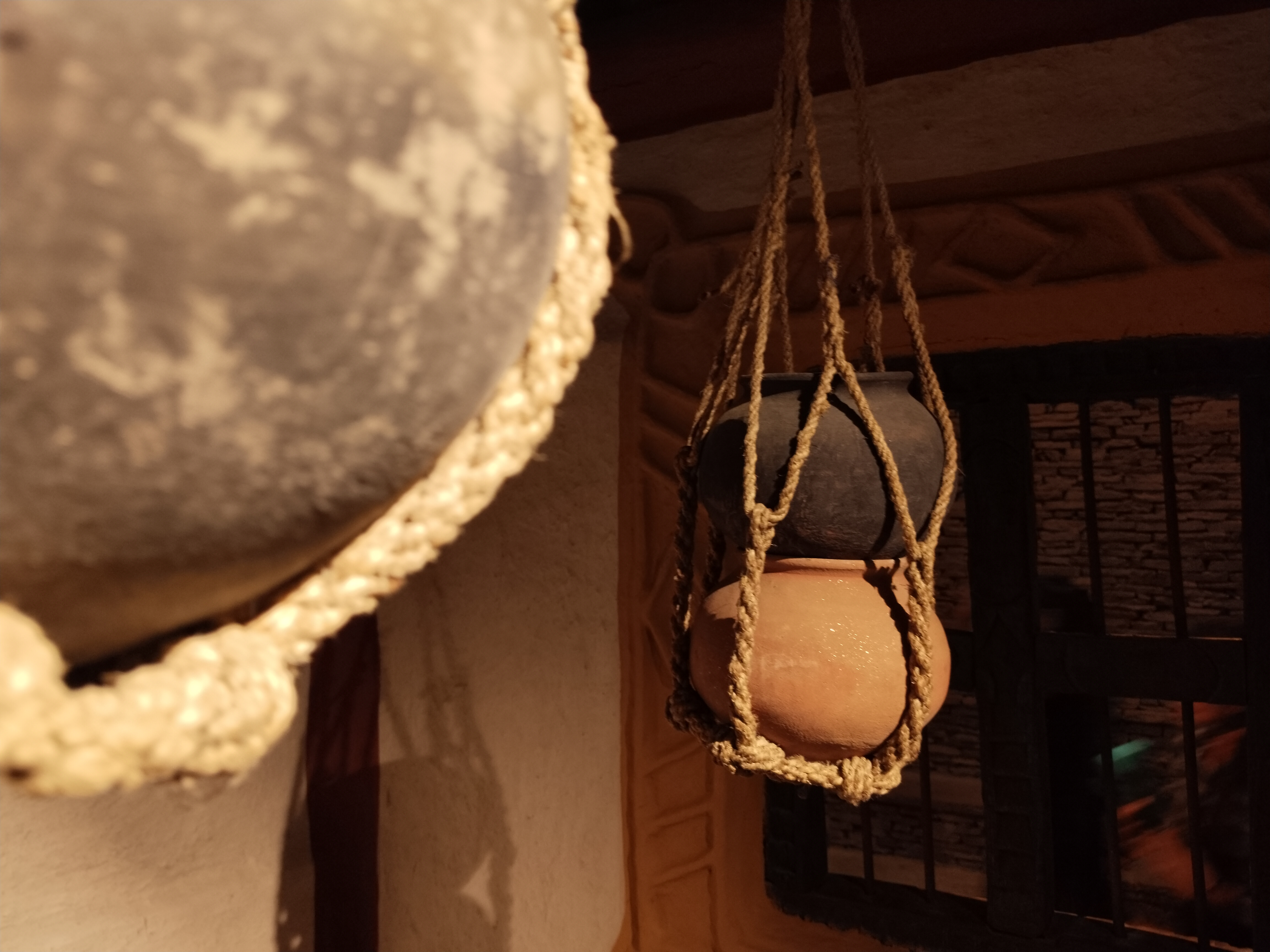
- Matkis (small earthen pots) stacked together in a traditional hanger.
- Material: Clay
- Period/culture: Ancient times to present

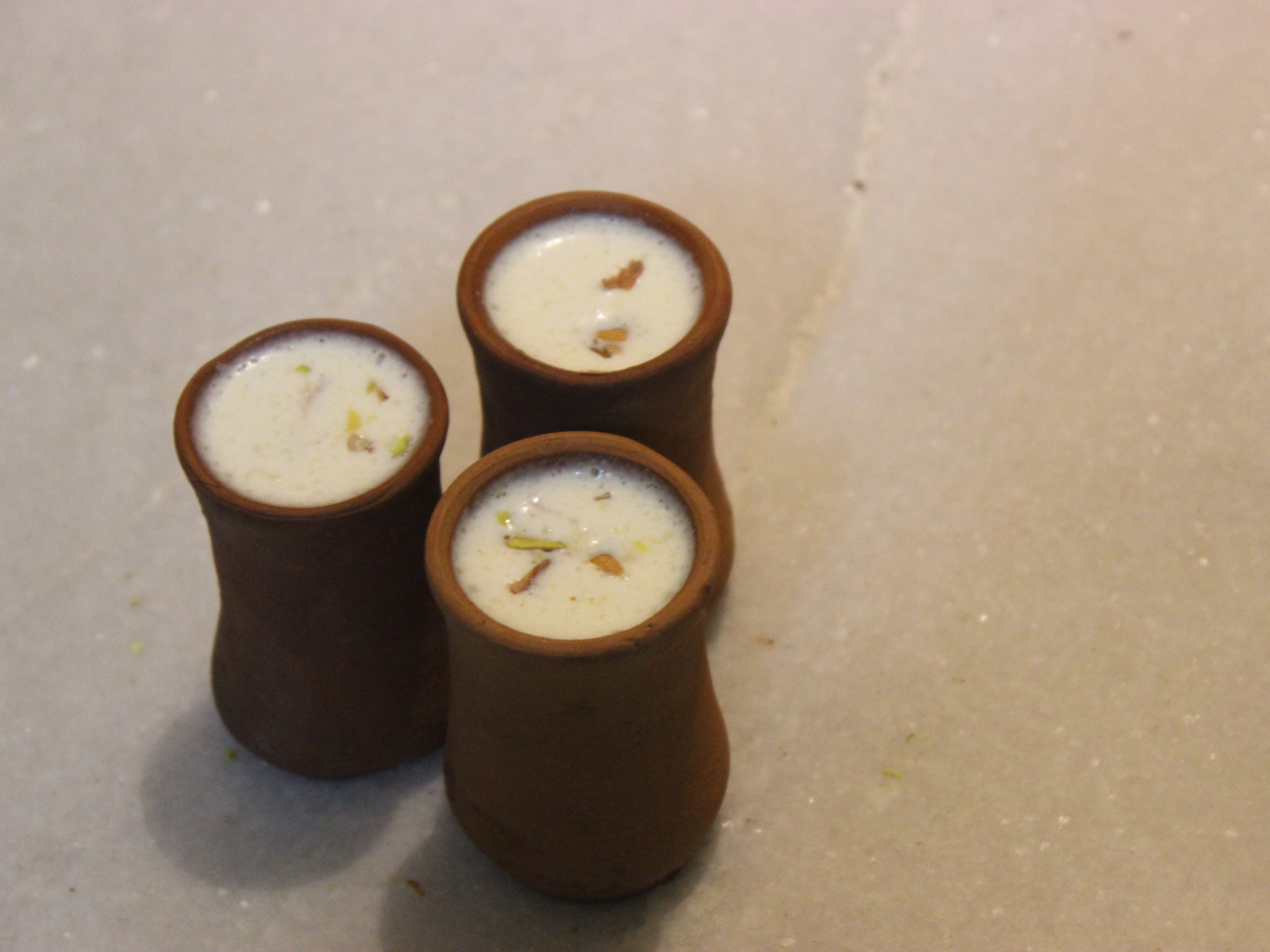
Pista Matka Kheer.

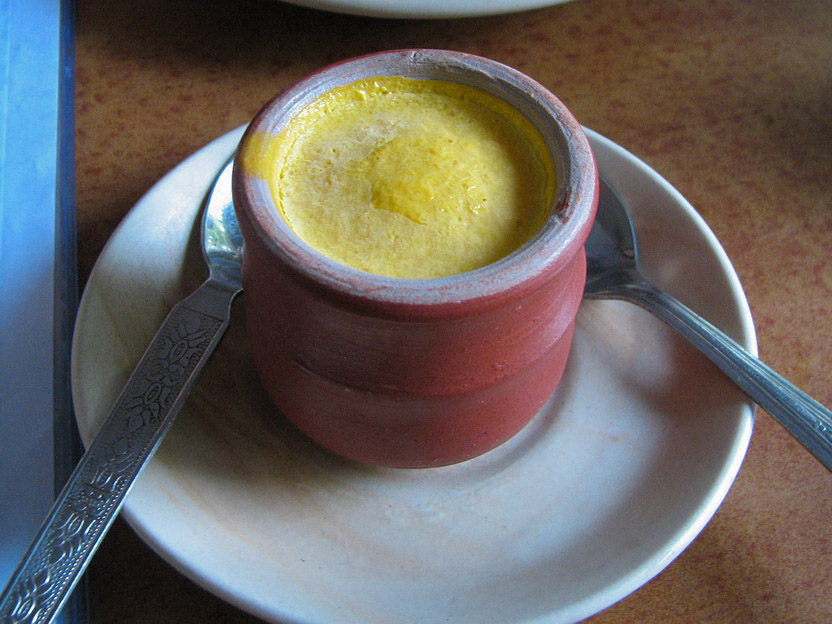
Matka Kulfi.

A matki or matka (Hindi and Urdu: maṭkī, maṭkā) in South Asia is an earthen pot used as a home "water storage cooler". It has been in use since ancient times and can be found in houses of every social class.

== Production ==
They are made by the combination of two types of clay: the first is taken from the surface of the earth, and the second after digging more than 10 feet deeper into the earth. Making a matka is a long process of at least 8 days. The clay is mixed with water, shaped, finished, polished, dried, and fired in a kiln for 5 days.

Modern designs are fitted with taps.

== Cooling process ==
The cooling process works through evaporative cooling. Capillary action causes water to evaporate from the mini-pores in the pot, taking the heat from the water inside, thus making the water inside cooler than the outside temperature. Hence it is used only during summer and not in winter.

== Gallery ==
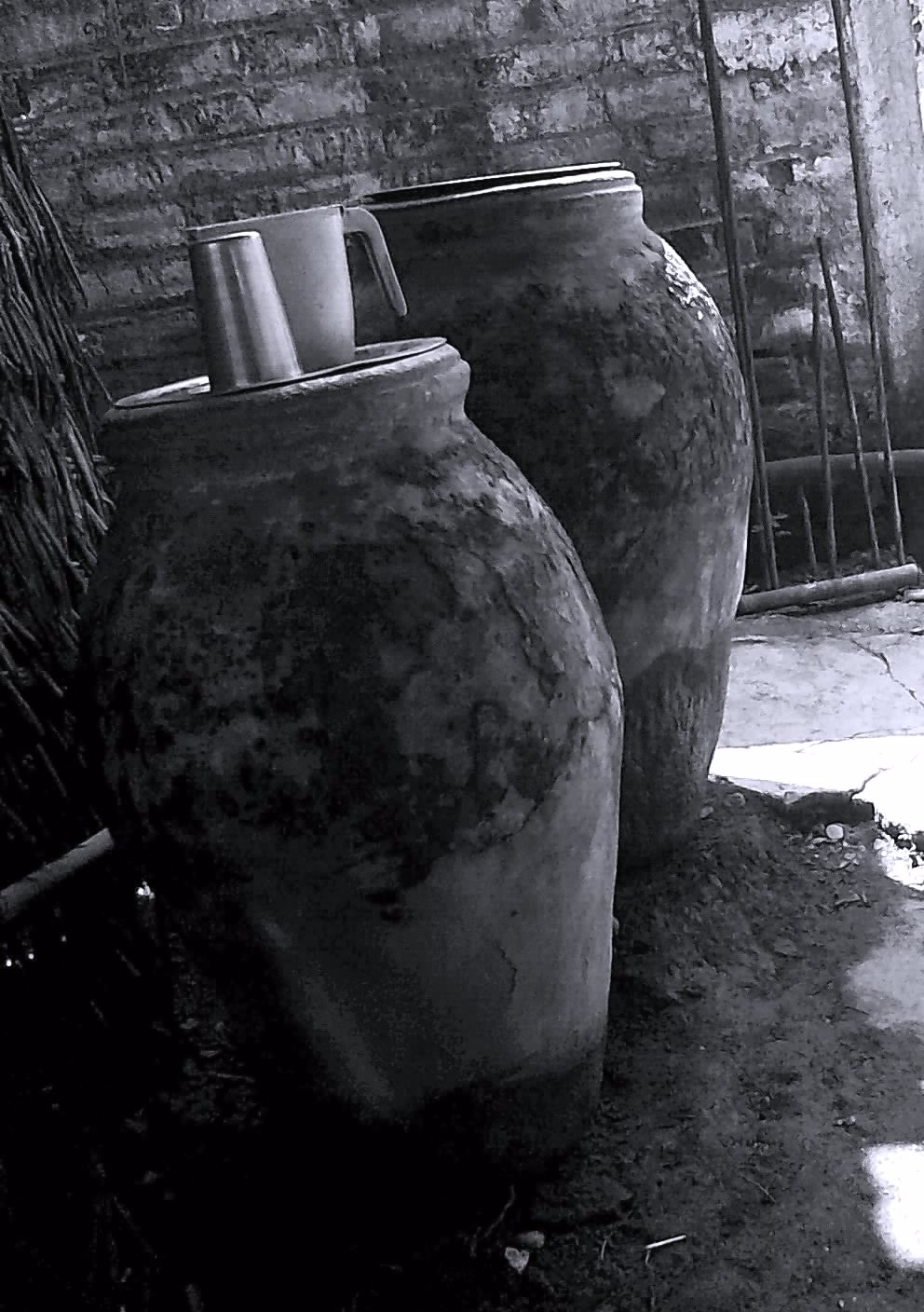
A matka (big earthen pot) on roadside at Chinawal, India.

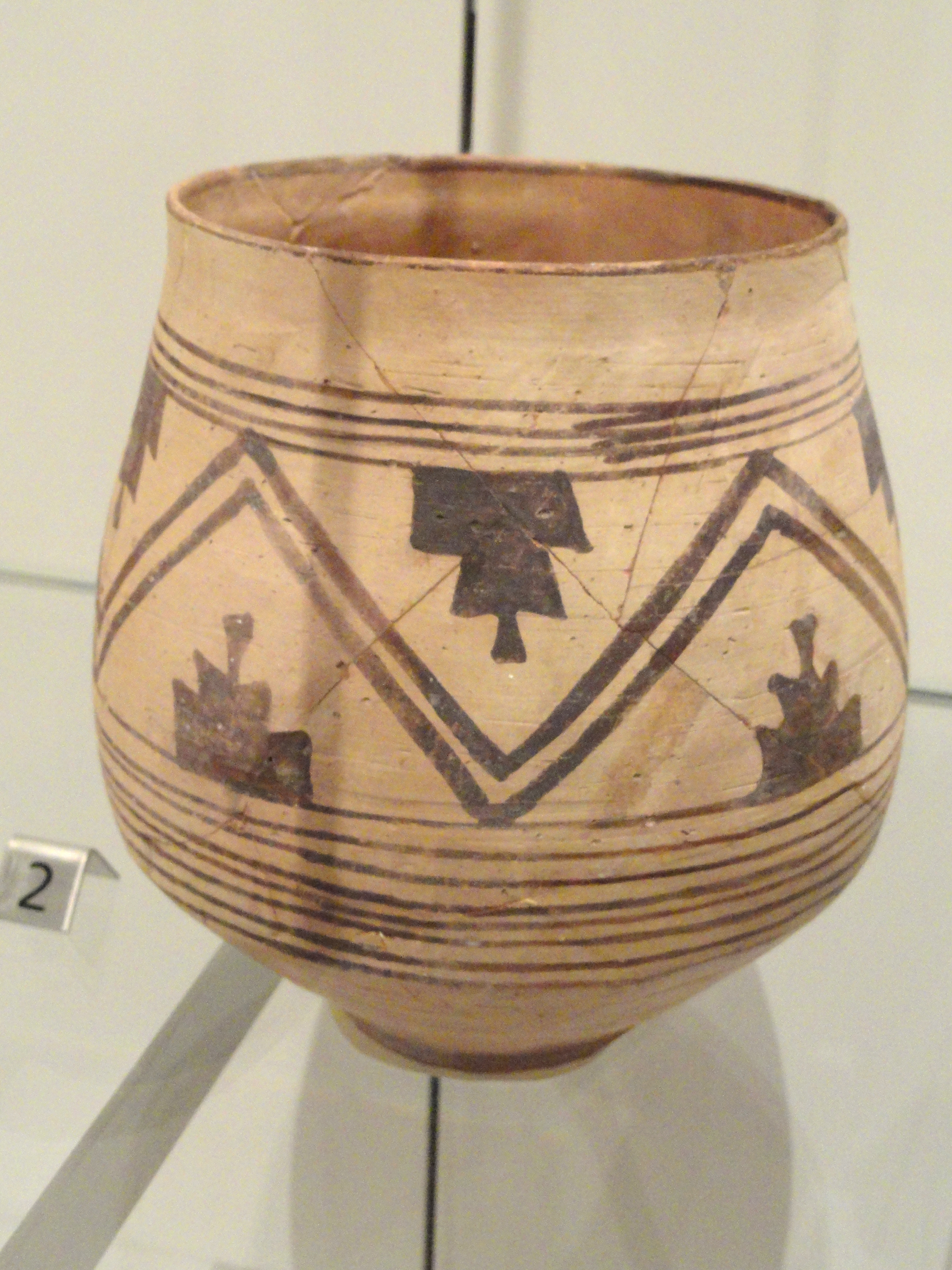
Indus Valley civilization pot from Harappan phase found at Quetta in Baluchistan, c. 2500-1900 BC, displayed at Royal Ontario Museum.

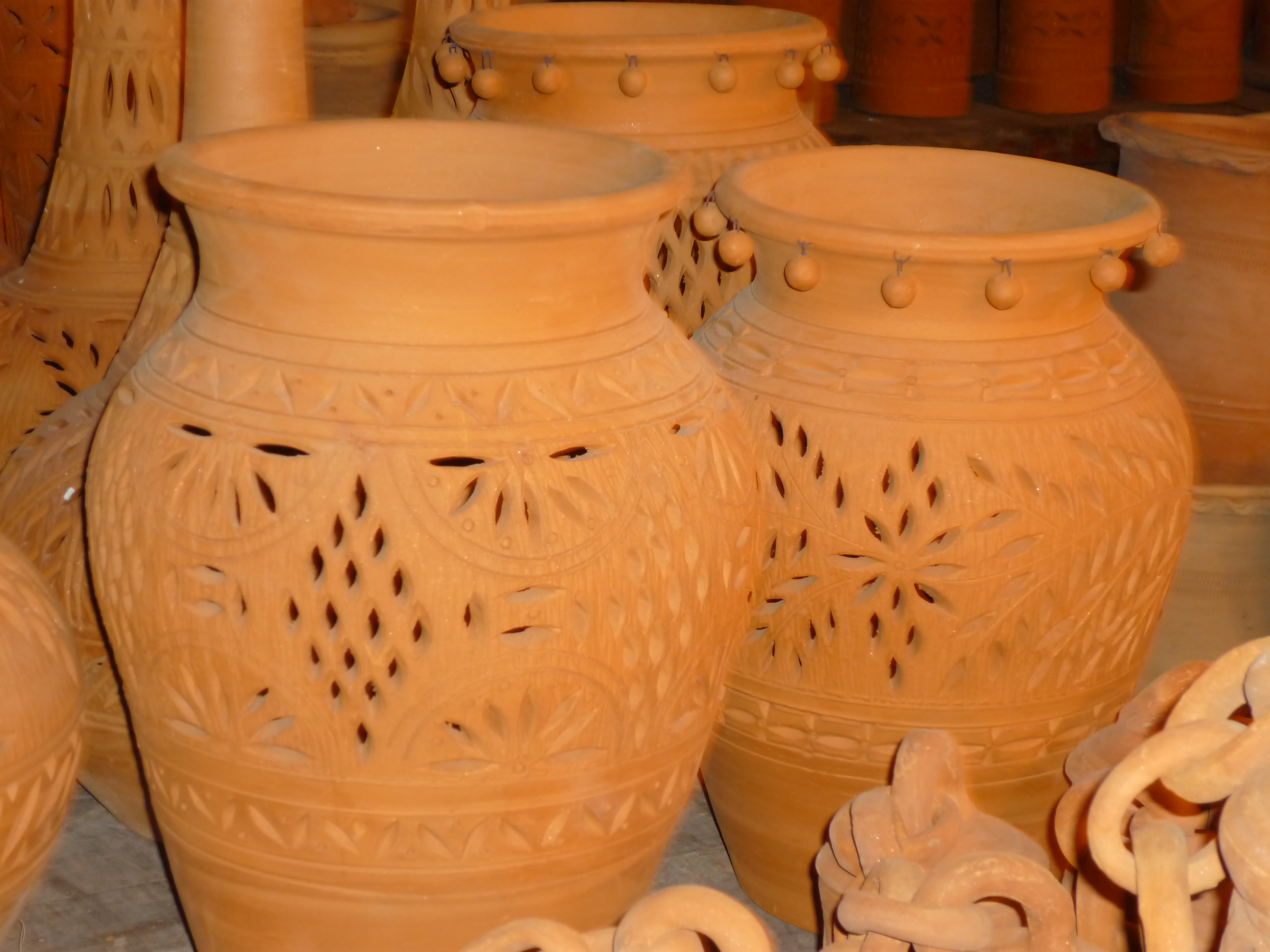
Clay pots in Punjab in Pakistan.

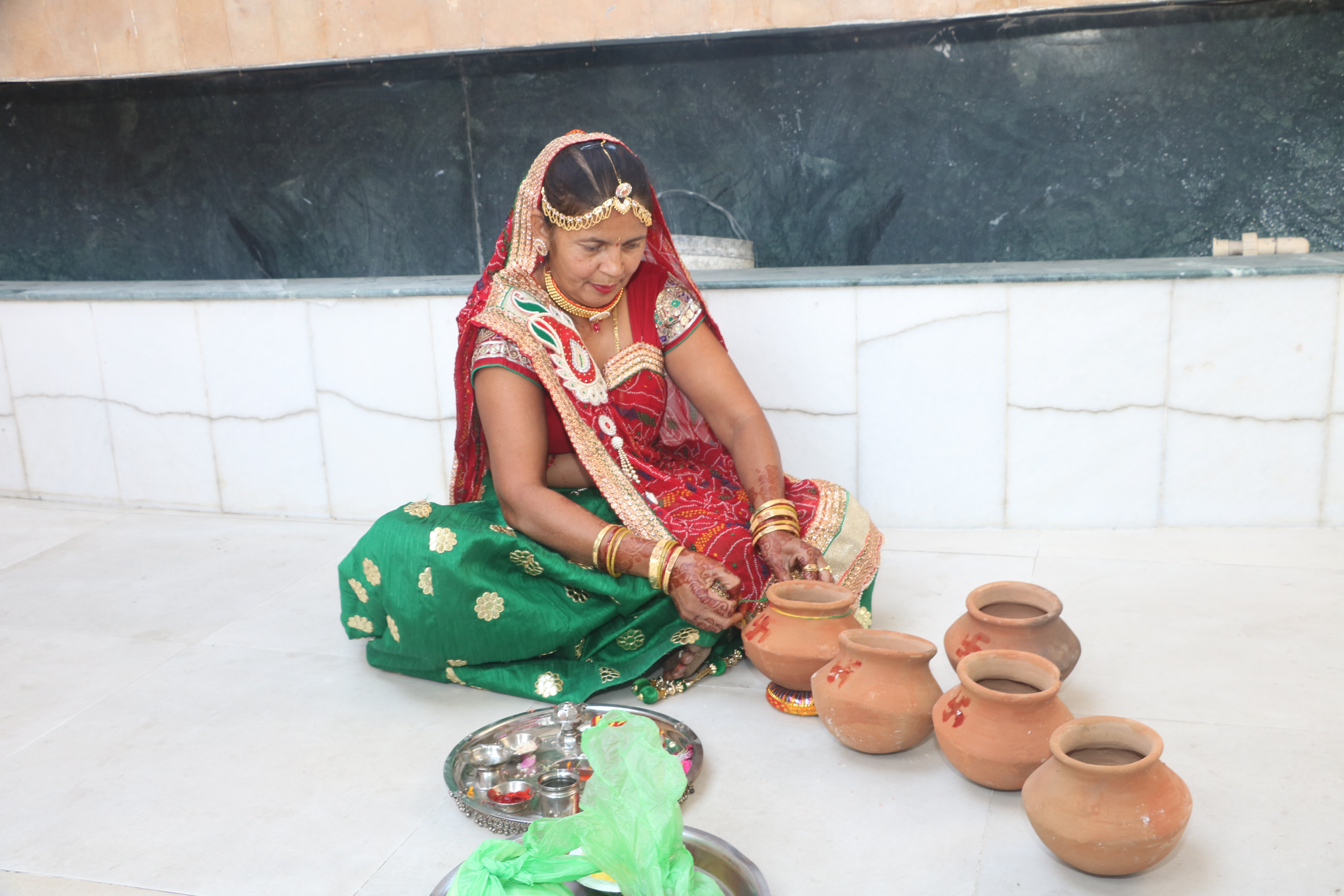
Decorating matkis prior to a wedding

== See also ==
- Kulhar
- Matka gambling
- Mashk
- Indian pottery
- Goatskin (material)
- Head-carrying
- Oven glove
- Pot-holder
- Trivet
- Tumpline
