= Dharmatma =

- Theatrical poster
- Directed by: Feroz Khan
- Written by: Kaushal Bharti
- Produced by: Feroz Khan
- Starring: Feroz Khan; Hema Malini; Rekha; Nazir Hussain; Premnath; Imtiaz Khan; Farida Jalal; Ranjeet; Danny Denzongpa; Madan Puri; Iftekhar; Dara Singh
- Cinematography: Kamal Bose
- Edited by: B.S. Glaad
- Music by: Kalyanji Anandji
- Release date: 25 July 1975
- Country: India
- Language: Hindi

Dharmatma (lit. 'Righteous Soul') is a 1975 Indian Hindi-language thriller film produced and directed by Feroz Khan. The cast includes Khan, Hema Malini, Rekha, Premnath, Imtiaz Khan, Danny Denzongpa, Farida Jalal, Ranjeet, Helen, Madan Puri, Jeevan, Iftekhar, Dara Singh, Satyen Kappu and Sudhir. The music is by Kalyanji Anandji.

It was the first Indian film to be shot in Afghanistan and the film also has scenes featuring Buzkashi, a Central Asian sport on horses, including aerial shots, which in turn won the film's cinematographer, Kamal Bose, the Filmfare Award for Best Cinematographer.

Dharmatma's plot is loosely based on The Godfather (1972), the first attempt in India to localise the American film, and the character of Premnath was inspired by the life and times of the then king of Matka gambling, Ratan Khatri.

== Synopsis ==
Wealthy, powerful, and influential, Seth Dharamdas lives in a palatial bungalow. He assists people in need, earning the name "Dharmatma". Dharamdas lives a parallel life as a gangster and matka king. The only person whom he fears is his own son Ranbir.

After a heated argument over Dharmatma's matka business, Ranbir leaves home for Afghanistan, where he stays with his uncle and manages his business. One day in a forest, while riding a horse, he finds a nomad, Jankura, and a woman, Reshma, fighting. He defends Reshma and they fall in love.

Meanwhile, in India, his sister Mona, is all set to marry Kundan, the son of their father's old friend. She writes to Ranbir to attend her wedding and give them his blessings. Ranbir accepts her invitation and arrives at the venue. The wedding commences, and Mona departs after the ceremony. While in the car, she gives her husband a steel ring with "I Love You" inscribed on it.

Ranbir leaves for Afghanistan. He proposes to Reshma, which she accepts. Her foster-father also reluctantly agrees to their marriage. A fortune-teller there predicts that Reshma will bring death to Ranbir, which has Reshma worried.

Meanwhile, in India, a business-rival by the name of Anokhelal proposes a narcotics deal to Dharmatma, which he refuses. His son-in-law tries to force him to accept the scheme but is unsuccessful. Dharmatma recognises the nature of his son-in-law and apologises for his mistake of letting his daughter marry him. He misses Ranbir and orders his assistant, Vikram Singh, to bring Ranbir back from Afghanistan. Vikram Singh agrees, but on the way, he is kidnapped by Anokhelal's sons, Natwar and Rishi and his brother Biradar.

In Afghanistan, Ranbir and Reshma prepare for their wedding. On the day of the wedding, they leave for the temple where Natwar and Rishi plant a bomb in the lovebirds' car. After praying, Reshma starts the jeep, and it explodes, killing her and leaving Ranbir heart-broken.

Natwar and Rishi attack a Matka centre of Dharmatma, injuring him and Kundan. They order a nurse to help Kundan kill Dharmatma. In Afghanistan, Ranbir gets the news of the attack on his father and returns to India. Kundan kills Dharmatma, assisted by the nurse but loses the ring gifted to him by his wife. Ranbir arrives and finds that his father is dead. He promises to avenge his father. Some days later, Ranbir goes for a drive with Anu, a childhood friend who secretly loves him, and he is attacked by goons sent by Anokhelal. The doctor who operated on his father gives him the ring which he found in Dharmatma's hand and tells him that his father died from suffocation. Ranbir suspects a hospital employee to be a part of his father's murder and asks the doctor about the nurse on duty that night. He visits her house only to find her killed by Natwar and Rishi. He tries the ring on her hand, but it doesn't fit.

Kundan arrives and lies to him that Vikram Singh is the killer and asks Ranbir to kill Vikram Singh.

Meanwhile, at Anokhelal's place, they raise a toast for dead Dharmatma. Ranbir arrives there. Kundan, Natwar, and Rishi hide upstairs and position a sniper to kill Ranbir. Downstairs, Ranbir accepts the drug deal, which his father declined and provides them with ₹ 5 million but on a condition that they will give him Vikram Singh, dead or alive, to which Anokhelal agrees. Anokhelal signals Natwar to stop Kundan from firing at Ranbir, which makes Kundan very angry. He returns home, drunk with a prostitute which makes Mona furious. Drunk and angry, Kundan beats Mona. This infuriates Ranbir. He arrives at their place and beats Kundan, but Mona stops him pleading him not to make her a widow. Kidnapped Vikram Singh is killed by Anokhelal.

They take his dead body in a coffin and meet Ranbir in a church's graveyard. Ranbir tries the ring on Vikram Singh, but it doesn't fit. Then Anokhelal laughs at him and confesses that he got his father killed. The police prevent goons from killing Ranbir, killing Anokhelal and his brother Biradar, but Ranbir is injured, too. He thanks the police for saving his life and departs.

At his place, while bandaging his wounds, Anu asks him to move to a safer place, to which he disagrees. Mona arrives and ties rakhi on Ranbir's wrist. She sees the ring in Ranbir's hands and reveals that she had given one to Kundan, but he has lost it. Ranbir realises that Kundan is the main culprit in the death of his father. He wants to kill him but is in a fix because he does not want to make his sister a widow.

Mona and Kundan return home, where they find Natwar and Rishi already present. Kundan signals Mona to go upstairs. Natwar and Rishi blackmail Kundan and demand he make a plan for Ranbir's death. Mona overhears this conversation and informs Ranbir but Kundan sees her.

Ranbir and Shakti Singh, a top henchman of his father, arrive at their place and find Mona dead. A mourning Ranbir receives a call from Kundan asking Ranbir to meet him at his hideout in Madh Island. Meanwhile, he plans to kill him and Shakti Singh.

Ranbir accepts and arrives, only to find a bunch of goons with machine guns there to kill him and Shakti Singh.

Kundan lands in a helicopter on a hilly place with a small cottage where Natwar and Rishi are present. They ask him about their safe house, to which he says that a ship in the sea is waiting for their arrival, and then he asks them about the narcotics. They reply that it is in the cottage. He asks its worth, to which they reply that it is 5 million. Then he kills them and takes the carton of drugs from the cottage back to the helicopter, where he finds Ranbir. He is astonished to see him alive and confesses to him about the plan according to which he killed his father. Ranbir then forces him to commit suicide by jumping off the hill.

Ranbir then closes all Matkas rackets which were led by his father, and hands over all the black money earned by his father to the police. He leaves with his mother and Anu, now his wife, to Afghanistan to continue his old work there.

== Cast ==
- Feroz Khan as Ranbir
- Hema Malini as Reshma
- Rekha as Anu
- Prem Nath as Dharamdas "Dharmatma"
- Danny Denzongpa as Zangoora
- Farida Jalal as Mona
- Ranjeet as Rishi
- Dara Singh as Shakti Singh
- Helen
- Zaheera
- Sudhir as Natwar
- Imtiaz Khan as Kundan
- Madan Puri as Pukhraj
- Jeevan as Anokhelal
- Satyen Kappu as Biradar
- Iftekhar as Vikram Singh
- Jagdish Raj as Dr. Jagdish
- Faryal as nurse
- Sulochana Latkar as Shanti
- Seema Kapoor
- Nadira
- Alka
- Nana Palsikar as Purshottam
- Nazir Hussain
- Krishan Dhawan
- Mohan Choti

== Soundtrack ==
Kalyanji Anandji composed all the songs of Dharmatma. This was their second collaboration with Feroz Khan after Apradh. Indeevar penned the lyrics. The music of the film had a fusion of Afghani music and Western music. The songs of the film became superhits.

No.	Title	Singer(s)	Length
1.	"Tere Chehre Mein Woh Jaadu Hai"	Kishore Kumar	04:11
2.	"Meri Galiyon Se Logo Ki Yaari"	Lata Mangeshkar, Mahendra Kapoor	05:24
3.	"Kya Khoob Lagti Ho"	Mukesh, Kanchan	04:07
4.	"Tum Ne Kisi Se Kabhi Pyaar Kiya Hai"	Mukesh, Kanchan	04:01

== See also ==
- Sarkar (2005 film), another Bollywood remake of The Godfather
