= Feroz Khan (actor) =

Indian actor and filmmaker (1935–2009)

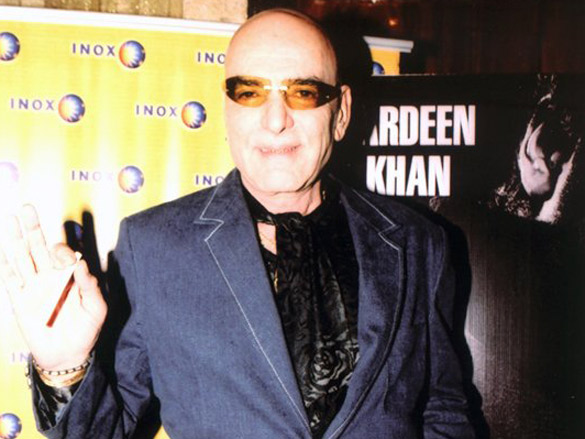
- Feroz Khan in 2005
- Born: Zulfiqar Ali Shah Khan; 25 September 1935; Bangalore, Kingdom of Mysore, British India (present-day Karnataka, India)
- Died: 27 April 2009 (aged 73); Bengaluru, Karnataka, India
- Other name: Clint Eastwood of India
- Occupations: Actor; film director; producer; screenwriter; editor
- Years active: 1957–2007
- Organization: F.K. Films Private Limited
- Spouse: Sundari Khan (m. 1965; div. 1985)
- Children: 2, including Fardeen Khan
- Relatives: Sanjay Khan (brother); Akbar Khan (brother); Sussanne Khan (niece); Zayed Khan (nephew)
- Awards: Filmfare Lifetime Achievement Award (2001)

Feroz Khan (born as Zulfiqar Ali Shah Khan; 25 September 1935 — 27 April 2009) was an Indian actor, film director, producer, screenwriter, and editor, best known for his work in Indian cinema. He appeared in over 60 films throughout his career and became one of Bollywood's popular style icons. Feroz Khan rose to prominence with Phani Majumdar's drama film Oonche Log (1965), and starred in successful Hindi films, such as Arzoo (1965), Aag (1967), Safar (1970), Mela (1971), Apradh (1972), Geeta Mera Naam (1974), Khotte Sikkay (1974), Kaala Sona (1975), Dharmatma (1975), Nagin (1976), Shankar Shambhu (1976) and Qurbani (1980). The 2007 superhit Welcome (2007), was his final film.

He won the Filmfare Best Supporting Actor Award for Aadmi Aur Insaan (1969) in 1970, and was honored with the Filmfare Lifetime Achievement Award in 2000. He has been called "Clint Eastwood of India".

== Early life ==
Feroz Khan was born on 25 September 1935 in Bangalore, India, to Sadiq Ali Khan, an Afghan from Ghazni, Afghanistan, and Fatima, who had Persian ancestry from Iran. His mother's family dealt in horse breeding. Khan was educated at Bishop Cotton Boys' School and St. Germain High School, Bangalore. Describing himself as a "rebel", he was kicked out from three schools, and never went to college, despite clearing his Senior Cambridge examinations, as he moved to Bombay (now Mumbai) to pursue a film career.

His younger brothers are Shah Abbas Khan (Sanjay Khan), Shahrukh Shah Ali Khan, Sameer Khan and Akbar Khan. Except Shahrukh, all brothers were associated with the entertainment industry. His younger sisters are Khurshid Shahnavar and Dilshad Begum Sheikh, popularly known as Dilshad Bibi.

== Career ==
=== 1960s: Early work and breakthrough ===
Khan made his debut as the second lead in Didi (1960).

Through the early 1960s and 1970s, he made low-budget thrillers opposite starlets. In 1962, he appeared in an English-language film titled Tarzan Goes to India opposite Simi Garewal.

His first big hit was in 1965, with Phani Majumdar's Oonche Log (1965), where he was pitted against screen idols Raaj Kumar and Ashok Kumar; he gave a notable sensitive performance. It was followed by more small budget hit films like Samson, Ek Sapera Ek Lootera and Char Darvesh. Again, in the same year, he played a sacrificing lover in the mushy musical Arzoo, starring Rajendra Kumar and Sadhana. With this, Khan started to receive A-list second lead roles.

With the film Aadmi Aur Insaan (1969), Khan won his first Filmfare award for Best Actor in a Supporting Role. His other hit films were Pyasi Sham (1969), Safar (1970), Khotey Sikkay (1974), Geeta Mera Naam (1974), Kaala Sona (1975) and Shankar Shambhu (1976).

He appeared alongside his younger brother Sanjay Khan in the hit films Upaasna (1971), Mela (1971) and Nagin (1976).

=== 1970s-1980s: Directorial and production success ===
He became a successful producer and director in 1971 so as to improve his career opportunities as a leading man with his first directorial film Apradh, which was the first Indian movie showing auto racing in Germany; Mumtaaz was his co-star.

He produced, directed and starred in the 1975 film Dharmatma, which was the first Indian film to be shot in Afghanistan and was also his first blockbuster hit as producer, director and star and marked the appearance of actress Hema Malini in a glamorous avatar. This movie was inspired by the Hollywood film The Godfather.

He also starred in the Punjabi film Bhagat Dhanna Jat (1974).

In 1980, he produced, directed and starred in Qurbani, alongside Vinod Khanna and Zeenat Aman, which was the biggest hit of his career and launched the singing career of iconic Pakistani pop singer Nazia Hassan, with her memorable track "Aap Jaisa Koi".

In 1986, he directed and starred in Janbaaz, a box office hit, which some consider to be one of his best movies, featuring an all-star cast with great songs and excellent cinematography.

In 1988, he directed and starred in Dayavan, which was a remake of the Indian Tamil film titled Nayakan.

=== 1990s to 2000s: Hiatus and final projects ===
In 1991, he starred in Meet Mere Man Ke, an outside production which was directed by Mehul Kumar.

After directing and starring in Yalgaar (1992), he took a long break from acting for 11 years.

He launched his son Fardeen Khan's career with the 1998 film Prem Aggan, which, however, was a box office bomb.

In 2003, he produced and directed Janasheen, also starring alongside his son Fardeen. This film marked his return to acting after 11 years and was also the last film he directed. Apart from sports cars, he also used performing animals in his films — a chimpanzee and lion were used in Janasheen.

He starred alongside his son again in an outside production Ek Khiladi Ek Haseena in 2005.

He made his last film appearance in the 2007 comedy film Welcome, co-starring Nana Patekar, Anil Kapoor, Paresh Rawal, Akshay Kumar, Katrina Kaif and Mallika Sherawat. Initially reluctant, Khan had finally agreed to do the role. Welcome eventually became a massive success, and Khan's dialogue Abhi Hum Zinda Hai(I am still alive) became largely popular among masses.

== Personal life ==
=== Family ===
Feroz Khan married Sundari Khan in 1965. She hails from a Sindhi Hindu family. They had two children, Laila Khan (born 1970) and Fardeen Khan (born 1974): Laila is married to businessman Farhan Furniturewala, Pooja Bedi's ex-husband, while Fardeen is married to Natasha Madhwani, daughter of former Bollywood actress Mumtaz. Mumtaz has stated in an interview that Feroz Khan was the most handsome hero in Hindi film industry.

In May 2006, Khan was a subject of major controversy while invited to visit Pakistan. In his remark, Khan stated "I am a proud Indian. India is a secular country. Muslims there are making lot of progress. Our President is a Muslim, Prime Minister a Sikh. Pakistan was made in the name of Islam but look how the Muslims are killing each other. I have not come here on my own. I was invited to come. Our films are so powerful that your government could not stop them for long." The remarks did not go well with then President of Pakistan Pervez Musharraf, who subsequently stated that Khan will not be issued a visa to Pakistan again.

=== Hobbies ===
Feroz Khan's hobbies included horse breeding and participating in horse racing, as well snooker, himself organising competitions.

During his last years, his other hobbies included reading philosophy books and writing poetry.

== Legacy ==
Khan is known for his flamboyant persona and inimitable style. Tina Das of ThePrint said, "Feroz Khan brought the wild west to Bollywood with his leather boots, hats and cigars, and he did it with swag." Farhana Farook of Filmfare said, "Feroz Khan wore his identity with elan. He is the original Khan." Subhash K Jha called him "the coolest actor of India". Filmfare placed him fourth in its "Bollywood's most stylish men" list.

In 2022, Khan was placed in Outlook India's "75 Best Bollywood Actors" list.

== Illness, death and funeral ==
Right after success of his son Fardeen's movie No Entry, Khan invited Anees Bazmee for dinner, who convinced him to do Welcome. During the meeting, Khan displayed signs of lung cancer but kept it to himself then and during the shoot, which was revealed by Bazmee in an interview in 2024.

Khan died of lung cancer on 27 April 2009. He was undergoing treatment at Breach Candy hospital in Mumbai, but expressed his desire to visit his farmhouse in Bangalore. Accordingly, he was brought here, where he died at around 1 a.m.

He was buried in Bangalore near his mother's grave at Hosur Road Shia Kabristan.

== Awards and nominations ==
Award	Movie	Category	Won/Nominated
BFJA Awards	Aadmi Aur Insaan	Best Supporting Actor	Won
Filmfare Awards	Aadmi Aur Insaan	Best Supporting Actor	Won
Filmfare Awards	Safar	Best Supporting Actor	Nominated
Filmfare Awards	International Crook	Best Supporting Actor	Nominated
Filmfare Awards	Lifetime Achievement	Lifetime Achievement Award (2001)	Won
IIFA Awards	Janasheen	Best Performance in a Negative Role	Won
Zee Awards	Lifetime Achievement	Lifetime Achievement Award (2008)	Won
Stardust Awards	Pride Of Industry	Pride Of Industry (2009)	Won

- Filmfare Best Supporting Actor Award for Aadmi Aur Insaan (1971)
- BFJA Award for Best Supporting Actor for Aadmi Aur Insaan (1971)
- Filmfare Nomination as Best Supporting Actor for Safar (1971)
- Filmfare Nomination as Best Supporting Actor for International Crook (1975)
- Filmfare Lifetime Achievement Award in 2001
- Filmfare Nomination as Best Villain for Janasheen (2004)
- IIFA Award for Best Performance in a Negative Role in 2004
- Zee Cine Award for Lifetime Achievement in 2008
- "Pride of the industry" at the Max Stardust Awards 2009.

== Filmography ==
Year	Title	Role	Notes
1957	Zamana		
1957	Bade Sarkar	Newly Wed Man	
1959	Didi	Madhu	
1960	Ghar Ki Laaj	Suresh	
1961	Mr. India	Feroz	
1962	Private Detective		
1962	Tarzan Goes to India	Prince Raghu Kumar	
1962	Reporter Raju	Rajkumar	
1962	Main Shaadi Karne Chala	Kewal	
1963	Bahurani	Vikram	
1964	Suhagan	Shankar	
1964	Samson	Salook	
1964	Char Dervesh	Qamar Bhakt	
1965	Arzoo	Ramesh	
1965	Oonche Log	Rajnikant (Rajjo)	
1965	Teesra Kaun	Prakash	
1965	Ek Sapera Ek Lootera	Mohan/Vijay Pratap Singh	
1966	Tasveer	Prakash	
1966	Main Wohi Hoon	Vijay	
1967	Raat Aur Din	Anil	
1967	Aurat	Anand	
1967	Woh Koi Aur Hoga	Gopal	
1967	Raat Andheri Thi	Dilip	
1967	C.I.D. 909	Raju/C.I.D. Agent 909	
1967	Aag	Shankar	
1968	Nadir Shah	Nadir Shah	
1968	Aaja Sanam	Dr. Satish	
1968	Jahan Mile Dharti Akash		
1968	Anjaam	Shekhar	
1969	Pyasi Sham	Ashok	
1969	Aadmi Aur Insaan	Jai Kishan/J.K.	
1969	Anjaan Hai Goli	Anand	
1970	Safar	Shekhar Kapoor	
1971	Ek Paheli	Sudhir	
1971	Upaasna	Advocate Ram	
1971	Mela	Shakti Singh	
1972	Apradh	Ram Khanna / Ramu	
1973	Kashmakash	Satish Gupta	
1974	Kisan Aur Bhagwan	Shyamu	
1974	Bhagat Dhanna Jatt	Shyamu	
1974	Khote Sikkay	Dilbar	
1974	Geeta Mera Naam	Raja	
1974	Anjaan Raahein	Anand	
1974	International Crook	SP Rajesh	
1975	Dharmatma	Ranbir	
1975	Kaala Sona	Rakesh	
1975	Rani Aur Laal Pari	Gulliver	Special appearance
1976	Nagin	Raj	
1976	Shankar Shambhu	Shankar/Badey Thakur	
1976	Sharafat Chhod Di Main Ne	Raju	
1976	Kabeela	Mangal	
1977	Jadu Tona	Dr. Kailash	
1977	Darinda	Rajesh	
1979	Chunaoti	Vijay	
1980	Qurbani	Rajesh Kumar	
1980	Lahu Pukarega	Sandeep	
1981	Khoon Aur Paani	Ram Singh/Thanedar Singh	
1982	Kachche Heere	Nephew of Kamal Singh	
1985	Ram Tere Kitne Naam	Himself	Cameo
1986	Janbaaz	Inspector Rajesh Singh	
1987	Raj Kapoor	Himself	Cameo
1988	Dayavan	Shankar Waghmare	Remake of Mani Ratnam's Nayagan
1988	Do Waqt Ki Roti	Shankar	
1988	Akarshan	Himself	Cameo
1991	Meet Mere Mann Ke	Thakur Jagat Pratap Singh	
1992	Yalgaar	Rajesh Ashwini Kumar	
1998	Prem Aggan	Himself	Guest appearance in the song "Har Dam Dam Badam"
2002	Kuch Tum Kaho Kuch Hum Kahein	Himself	
2003	Janasheen	Saba Karim Shah	
2005	Chitappa		
2005	Ek Khiladi Ek Haseena	Jahangir Khan	
2007	Om Shanti Om	Himself	Cameo
2007	Welcome	Ranvir 'RDX' Dhanraj Xaka	

=== Other crew positions ===
Year	Title	Director	Writer	Producer	Editor	Notes
1972	Apradh	Yes		Yes		
1975	Dharmatma	Yes		Yes		
1980	Qurbani	Yes	Yes	Yes	Yes	
1986	Janbaaz	Yes		Yes	Yes	
1988	Dayavan	Yes		Yes	Yes	
1992	Yalgaar	Yes	Yes	Yes	Yes	
1998	Prem Aggan	Yes	Yes	Yes	Yes	
2003	Janasheen	Yes	Screenplay	Yes	Yes	
