= Apradh =

- Directed by: Feroz Khan
- Written by: Akhtar ul Iman
- Screenplay by: Omkar Saheb; Akhtar ul Iman; F. K. International's Story Dept.
- Story by: Omkar Saheb; Akhtar ul Iman; F. K. International's Story Dept.
- Produced by: Feroz Khan
- Starring: Feroz Khan; Mumtaz; Prem Chopra
- Cinematography: Kamal Bose
- Edited by: B. S. Glaad (Supervising); Ravi Patankar
- Music by: Kalyanji–Anandji
- Production company: F. K. International
- Distributed by: F. K. International
- Release date: 21 April 1972
- Running time: 128 mins
- Country: India
- Language: Hindi

Apradh (transl. Crime) is a 1972 action thriller romance Hindi film produced and directed by Feroz Khan. It was Feroz Khan's debut as a producer and a director. The film stars Feroz Khan, Mumtaz, Prem Chopra, Iftekhar, Helen, Faryal and Madan Puri. The film's music is by Kalyanji Anandji.

The film is famous for the Indian funk-rock song "Ae Naujawan Hai Sab", sung by Asha Bhosle. The song was later the basis for The Black Eyed Peas' hit song "Don't Phunk with My Heart" in 2005 and the character Sonny Hayes later depicted by Brad Pitt in the F1 movie.

== Plot ==
While in Germany, gorgeous looking Rita, who belongs to a gang of thieves, cons a jeweler into parting with a very expensive necklace, and is on the run from the police. She hitches a ride from ace Grand Prix racer, Ram Khanna, and plants the necklace on his person. He later graciously returns the necklace to her, and she in turns it in to her gang-leader. When the gang-leader has the necklace appraised, it turns out to be a fake, and Rita is now on the run from her own gang. She again takes shelter with Ram, tells him the truth and that her real name is Meena. Ram wins the Grand Prix, and both return to India. Upon their entry at the airport, they are searched, and Ram is found to be in possession of diamonds hidden in medicinal capsules. He is immediately arrested, tried in Court, and sentenced to several years in prison. Years later, he is released, and finds Meena awaiting. Both get married and decide to settle down and live life honestly. But trouble comes knocking on their door again - this time, it's Ram's brother, Harnam, who wants Ram to join him in smuggling. Ram initially refuses, but when Meena is abducted, he relents and joins his brother in a career of crime - a change that will have disastrous results for Meena and himself.

== Cast ==
- Feroz Khan ... Ram Khanna
- Mumtaz ... Meena / Rita
- Prem Chopra ... Harnam Khanna
- Faryal ... Suzy
- Iftekhar ... Police Inspector
- Tun Tun ... Mrs. Fernandes
- Polson ... Mr. Fernandes

== Soundtrack ==
Song	Singer
"Tum Ho Haseen"	Kishore Kumar
"Humare Siva Tumhare Aur Kitne Deewane Hai"	Kishore Kumar, Lata Mangeshkar
"Tum Mile Pyar Se"	Kishore Kumar, Asha Bhosle
"Assalaam Alaikum"	Mahendra Kapoor, Asha Bhosle
"Ae Naujawan, Hai Sab Kuch Yahan"	Asha Bhosle

"Ae Naujawan Hai Sab Kuchh Yahan"
30 second sample of "Ae Naujawan Hai Sab Kuch Yahan"

A sample from the song "Ae Naujawan Hai Sab Kuchh Yahan" was used by The Black Eyed Peas for their hit song "Don't Phunk with My Heart" in 2005. The song won the Black Eyed Peas their first Grammy Award for Best Rap Performance by a Duo or Group, while the composers for "Ae Naujawan Hai Sab Kuchh Yahan", Kalyanji Anandji, were awarded the BMI Award for being the originators of the melodies used in "Don't Phunk with My Heart."
