= List of Hindi films of 1981 =

A list of films produced by the Bollywood, film industry based in Mumbai in 1981.

== Successful stars of the year ==
1. Amitabh Bachchan- Bachchan went strength to strength with box office smashes like Naseeb, Laawaris, Kaalia and Yaarana.

2. Shatrughan Sinha- Sinha played second/third lead in the top two highest grossers Kranti and Naseeb.

3. Rishi Kapoor- Apart from featuring as lead in Naseeb with Bachchan and Sinha, Kapoor also starred in Katilon Ke Kaatil with Dharmendra.

4. Hema Malini- Malini starred as the female lead in the top three highest grossers Kranti, Naseeb and Meri Aawaz Suno.

5. Parveen Babi- Apart from playing second fiddle to Hema Malini in Kranti and Meri Aawaz Suno, Babi also starred in Kaalia opposite Amitabh Bachchan.

6. Zeenat Aman- Aman featured opposite Amitabh Bachchan in Laawaris and Dharmendra in Katilon Ke Kaatil.

7. Reena Roy- Apart from starring alongside her boyfriend Shatrughan Sinha in Naseeb, Roy had a parallel lead role in Sanjay Dutt's debut film Rocky.

8. Tina Munim- Munim starred opposite Rishi Kapoor in Katilon Ke Kaatil and debutant Sanjay Dutt in Rocky.

The year was also notable for several actors like Sanjay Dutt, Kumar Gaurav, Kamal Haasan, Rati Agnihotri, Madhavi and Vijayta Pandit making successful debuts. Also Dilip Kumar made a blockbuster comeback with Kranti.

== Highest-grossing films ==
The highest-grossing films at the Indian box office in 1981:

Rank	Title	Gross collection
1	Kranti	₹20 crore
2	Naseeb	₹14.5 crore
3	Meri Aawaz Suno	₹13 crore
4	Laawaris	₹12 crore
5	Love Story	₹11 crore
6	Ek Duuje Ke Liye	₹10 crore
7	Katilon Ke Kaatil	₹8 crore
8	Kaalia	₹7.5 crore
9	Yaarana	₹7 crore
10	Rocky	₹6 crore

== Films ==
Title	Director	Cast	Genre	Sources
Aakhri Mujra	Hiren Nag	Ajit Khan, Asha Parekh	Drama	
Aankhon Ke Saamne	D. S. Azad	Mithun Chakraborty, Vijayendra Ghatge		
Aapas Ki Baat	Harmesh Malhotra	Raj Babbar, Poonam Dhillon, Shakti Kapoor	Action, Romance	
Aas Paas	J. Om Prakash	Dharmendra, Hema Malini, Prem Chopra	Drama	
Agni Pareeksha	Kamal Majumdar	Amol Palekar, Parikshit Sahni		
Ahista Ahista	Esmayeel Shroff	Shammi Kapoor, Nanda	Drama	
Armaan	Anand Sagar	Raj Babbar, Shakti Kapoor, Ranjeeta Kaur	Drama	
Barsaat Ki Ek Raat	Shakti Samanta	Amitabh Bachchan, Raakhee Amjad Khan	Action	
Baseraa	Ramesh Talwar	Shashi Kapoor, Raakhee, Rekha	Drama	
Be-Shaque	Kashinath	Mithun Chakraborty, Yogeeta Bali, Amrish Puri	Drama	
Biwi-O-Biwi	Rahul Rawail	Randhir Kapoor, Poonam Dhillon, Sanjeev Kumar	Comedy	
Bhula Na Dena	Harsh Kholi	Rakesh Roshan, Kajal Kiran, Helen	Romance	
Bulundi	Esmayeel Shroff	Raaj Kumar, Danny Denzongpa, Kim Yashpal	Crime Thriller	
Chakra	Rabindra Dharmaraj	Smita Patil, Naseeruddin Shah, Kulbhushan Kharbanda	Drama	
Chashme Buddoor	Sai Paranjpye	Ravi Baswani, Rakesh Bedi, Farooq Sheikh, Deepti Naval	Drama	
Chehre Pe Chehra	Raj Tilak	Sanjeev Kumar, Vinod Mehra, Rekha, Sulakshana Pandit	Thriller	
Commander	Rakesh Kumar	Amjad Khan, Tanuja, Arun Govil	Action Drama	
Daasi	Raj Khosla	Sanjeev Kumar, Rekha, Moushumi Chatterjee, Rakesh Roshan	Drama	
Dahshat	Shyam Ramsay, Tulsi Ramsay	Navin Nischol, Sarika, Om Shivpuri, Nadira Babbar	Horror	
Dard	Ambrish Sangal	Rajesh Khanna, Hema Malini	Crime Drama	
Dhanwan	Surendra Mohan	Rajesh Khanna, Reena Roy, Rakesh Roshan	Drama	
Dhuan	Dulal Guha	Mithun Chakraborty, Raakhee Gulzar, Ranjeeta, Amjad Khan	Thriller	
Ek Aur Ek Gyarah	Ashok Roy	Shashi Kapoor, Vinod Khanna, Zarina Wahab, Neetu Singh	Comedy	
Ek Duuje Ke Liye	K. Balachander	Kamal Haasan, Rati Agnihotri	Drama	
Ek Hi Bhool	T. Rama Rao	Jeetendra, Rekha	Family, Drama	
Fiffty Fiffty	Somu Mukherjee	Rajesh Khanna, Tina Munim, Kader Khan	Drama	
Ganga Maang Rahi Balidan	Radhakant	Sohrab Modi, Hina Kausar, Dev Kumar	Drama	
Gehra Zakhm	Deepak Bahry	Vinod Mehra, Ranjeeta Kaur	Romance	
Ghamandee	Ramesh Bedi	Mithun Chakraborthy, Sarika	Action	
Ghungroo Ki Awaaz	Shyam Ramsay, Tulsi Ramsay	Vijay Anand, Rekha	Drama	
Gramayan	Arun Khopkar	Tushar Dalvi, Parzun Dastur, Amin Gazi		
Guru Suleman Chela Pahelwan	Radhakant	Mehmood, Dara Singh, Padma Khanna	Comedy	
Haqdaar	S. K. Luthra	Rakesh Roshan, Suresh Oberoi, Yogeeta Bali		
Harjaee	Ramesh Behl	Randhir Kapoor, Tina Munim, Shammi Kapoor	Drama	
Hotel	Syham Ramsey. Tulsi Ramsey	Navin Nischol, Rakesh Roshan, Bindiya Goswami	Mystery	
Hum Se Badkar Kaun	Deepak Bahry	Amjad Khan, Mithun Chakraborty, Danny Denzongpa, Vijendra, Ranjeeta, Kajal Kiran, Kalpana Iyer, Ranjeet	Action	
Itni Si Baat	Madhu M	Sanjeev Kumar, Moushumi Chatterjee		
Jail Yatra	Bhappi Sonie	Vinod Khanna, Reena Roy		
Jeene Ki Arzoo	Rajasekhar	Mithun Chakraborthy, Rakesh Roshan, Rati Agnihotri	Romance	
Jiyo To Aise Jiyo	Kanak Mishra	Mithun Chakraborty, Ranjeeta, Talluri Rameshwari, Madan Puri	Action	
Josh	Raj N. Sippy	Anil Dhswan, Sarika, Amjad Khan, Vidya Sinha		
Jwala Daku	R. P. Swamy	Salma Agha, Birbal, Urmila Bhatt	Drama	
Jyoti	Pramod Chakravarty	Jeetendra, Hema Malini, Vijendara Ghatge, Ashok Kumar		
Kaalia	Tinnu Anand	Amitabh Bachchan, Parveen Babi, Pran, Asha Parekh, Kader Khan, K. N. Singh, Amjad Khan	Action	
Kaaran	B. R. Ishara	Ramesh Deo, Shoma Anand, Aruna Irani	Romance	
Kachche Heere	Narendra Bedi	Feroz Khan, Reena Roy, Danny Denzongpa	Action	
Kahan Kahan Se Guzar Gaya	M. S. Sathyu	Anil Kapoor, Pankaj Kapur, Farah Khan	Drama	
Kahani Ek Chor Ki	S. Ramanathan	Moushumi Chatterjee, Jeetendra, Vinod Mehra, Nirupa Roy	Drama	
Kal Hamara Hai	Girish Ranjan	Asrani, Aarti Bhattacharya, A. K. Hangal, Padma Khanna	Drama	
Kalyug	Shyam Benegal	Shashi Kapoor, Rekha, Raj Babbar	Drama	
Kanhaiyaa	Khalid Sami	Master Amit, Master Chaitanya, Asha Chandra	Action, Crime, Drama	
Kanoon Aur Mujrim	Sham Jethani	Bharat Kapoor Padma Khanna, Jayshree T.		
Katilon Ke Kaatil	Anil Hingorani, Arjun Hingorani	Dharmendra, Rishi Kapoor, Zeenat Aman, Tina Munim, Nirupa Roy, Amjad Khan, Shakti Kapoor	Romance	
Khara Khota	B.R. Ishara	Raj Kiran, Sarika, Soma Anand	Drama	
Khawaja Ki Diwani	Akbar Balam	Bharat Bhushan, Arpana Choudhary, Mazhar Khan		
Khel Muqaddar Ka	Veerendra	Bharat Bhushan, Asha Parekh, Dara Singh	Action, Family	
Khilte Suman	Sukhdev Ahluwalia	Anoop, Vadisha		
Khoon Aur Paani	Chand	Feroz Khan, Jeetendra, Parveen Babi, Rekha, Ranjeet, Ajit, Nirupa Roy	Action	
Khoon Ka Rishta	Samir Ganguly	Mukri, Prashanth, Jagdeep, Jeetendra, Pran	Action	
Khoon Ki Takkar	Haresh Chawla	Vinod Mehra, Ranjeeta Kaur, Neeta Mehta, Ranjeet	Action	
Khuda Kasam	Lekh Tandon	Vinod Khanna, Tina Munim, Pran		
Kranti	Manoj Kumar	Dilip Kumar, Manoj Kumar, Shashi Kapoor, Shatrughan Sinha, Hema Malini, Parveen Babi, Nirupa Roy, Prem Chopra, Tom Alter	Action, Patriotic	
Krodhi	Subhash Ghai	Dharmendra, Shashi Kapoor, Zeenat Aman, Hema Malini, Sachin, Poonam Dhillon, Pran, Premnath	Action	
Kudrat	Chetan Anand	Rajesh Khanna, Vinod Khanna, Hema Malini, Priya Rajhans, Raaj Kumar	Drama	
Laawaris	Prakash Mehra	Amitabh Bachchan, Zeenat Aman, Amjad Khan, Raakhee Gulzar, Ranjeet, Suresh Oberoi, Priti Sapru, Shriram Lagoo, Jeevan	Drama	
Ladaaku	Dinesh Ramanesh	Vijay Arora, Jagdeep, Shakti Kapoor, Amjad Khan		
Ladies Tailor	Khalid Akthar	Sanjeev Kumar, Reena Roy, Pran, Amjad Khan, Aruna Irani	Comedy	
Laparwah	Ravikant Nagaich	Prem Bedi, Birbal, Mithun Chakraborty	Action	
Love Story	Rahul Rawail	Kumar Gaurav, Vijeta Pandit, Rajendra Kumar, Danny Denzongpa, Amjad Khan	Romance	
Maan Gaye Ustaad	Shibu Mitra	Pran, Shashi Kapoor, Hema Malini		
Madhuman	Basu Battharcharya			
Mahabali Hanuman	Babbubhai Mistry	Rakesh Pandey, Kavitha Kiran, Hercules	Adventure	
Mahfil	Amar Kumar	Ashok Kumar, Sadhana, Anil Dhawan	Action. Drama	
Main Aur Mera Haathi	R. Thiagaraj	Mithun Chakraborty, Poonam Dhillon, Suresh Oberoi, Sharat Saxena	Action	
Mangalsutra	Vijay. B	Rekha, Anant Nag, Jagdeep, Madan Puri, Rajendranath	Horror, Thriller	
Meena Kumari Ki Amar Kahani	Sohrab Modi	Bharat Bhushan, Sona Mirza	Drama	
Meri Aawaz Suno	S. V. Rajendra Singh	Jeetendra, Hema Malini, Parveen Babi	Action	
Nai Imarat	Ram Pahlwa	Sarika, Ranjeeta, Amrish Puri, Madan Puri	Drama	
Nakhuda	Dilip Naik	Raj Kiran, Swaroop Sampat, Kulbhushan Kharbanda	Drama	
Naram Garam	Hrishikesh Mukherjee	Amol Palekar, Swaroop Sampat, Shatrughan Sinha, Utpal Dutt, A. K. Hangal, Kiran Vairahle	Comedy	
Nari	S. K. Chand	Rakesh Roshan, Neeta Mehta, Madan Puri	Drama	
Naseeb	Manmohan Desai	Amitabh Bachchan, Shatrughan Sinha, Rishi Kapoor, Hema Malini, Reena Roy, Kim Yashpal, Pran, Kader Khan, Amjad Khan, Prem Chopra, Shakti Kapoor, Amrish Puri, Yusuf Khan	Action, Comedy, Romance	
Paanch Qaidi	Shibu Mitra	Vijayendra Ghatge, Girish Karnad, Shakti Kapoor, Sarika	Action	
Pehla Adhyay	Vishnu Mahtur	Madan Jain, Dinesh Sakul	Drama	
Plot No. 5	Yogesh Saxena	Uttam Kumar, Amol Palekar, Pradeep Kumar, Sarika		
Poonam	Harmesh Malhotra	Raj Babbar, Poonam Dhillon, Shakti Kapoor	Drama	
Prem Geet	Sudesh Issar	Raj Babbar, Anita Raj	Drama	
Professor Pyarelal	Brij Sadanah	Dharmendra, Zeenat Aman, Vinod Mehra, Shammi Kapoor, Simi Garewal, Amjad Khan		
Pyaasa Sawan	Dasari Narayana Rao	Jeetendra, Moushumi Chatterjee, Reena Roy	Drama	
Raaz	Harmesh Malhotra	Raj Babbar, Helen	Drama	
Roohi	S. U. Syed	Mazhar Khan, Zarina Wahab	Drama	
Rocky	Sunil Dutt	Sanjay Dutt, Tina Munim, Reena Roy, Sunil Dutt, Ranjeet, Shakti Kapoor, Gulshan Grover, Amjad Khan	Romance, Action	
Saajan Ki Saheli	Sawaan Kumar	Nutan, Rajendra Kumar, Vinod Mehra, Rekha		
Sadgati	Satyajit Ray	Om Puri, Smita Patil	Drama	
Sahhas	Ravikant Nagaich	Mithun Chakraborty	Action	
Sameera	Vinay Shukla	Mithun Chakraborty, Shabana Azmi, Parikshit Sahni	Drama	
Sannata	Shyam Ramsay. Tulsi Ramsay	Vinod Mehra, Vijay Arora, Bindiya Goswami, Helen	Horror. Mystery	
Sansani: The Sensation	Irshad	Vinod Mehra, Bindiya Goswami	Horror	
Sazaye Maut	Vidhu Vinod Chopra	Naseeruddin Shah, Dilip Dhawan	Drama	
Shakka	Shyam Ralhan	Jeetendra, Simple Kapadia, Pinchoo Kapoor	Action	
Shama	Kader Khan	Shabana Azmi, Kader Khan		
Sharda	Lekh Tandon	Jeetendra, Talluri Rameshwari	Drama	
Shikari	C. R. Simha	Srinath, Manjula, Akhila		
Shradhanjali	Anil Sharma	Raakhee Gulzar, Suresh Oberoi, Arun Govil	Drama, Family	
Silsila	Yash Chopra	Amitabh Bachchan, Jaya Bachchan, Rekha, Sanjeev Kumar, Shashi Kapoor	Romantic, Drama	
Tajurba	Nikhil Saini	Raj Babbar, Smita Patel, Nasruddin Shah	Action, Adventure	
Umrao Jaan	Muzaffar Ali	Rekha, Farooq Sheikh, Naseeruddin Shah	Drama	
Vasiqedars, The Pensioners of Avadh				
Waqt Ki Deewar	Ravi Tandon	Pran, Sanjeev Kumar, Jeetendra, Neetu Singh, Sulakshana Pandit	Action	
Wardat	Ravikant Nagaich	Mithun Chakraborty, Kaajal Kiran, Iftekhar	Thriller	
Woh Phir Nahin Aaye	Joginder Shelley	Bhagwan Dada, Rita Baduri, Jalal Agha		
Yaarana	Rakesh Kumar	Amitabh Bachchan, Amjad Khan, Neetu Singh, Kader Khan, Ranjeet, Jeevan	Drama	
Yeh Rishta Na Tootay	K. Vijayan	Rajendra Kumar, Mala Sinha, Vinod Mehra, Bindiya Goswami		
Zamane Ko Dikhana Hai	Nasir Hussain	Rishi Kapoor, Padmini Kolhapure, Amjad Khan, Kader Khan, Tariq Khan	Romance, Thriller	

== See also ==
- List of Hindi films of 1980
- List of Hindi films of 1982
