= Kader Khan filmography =

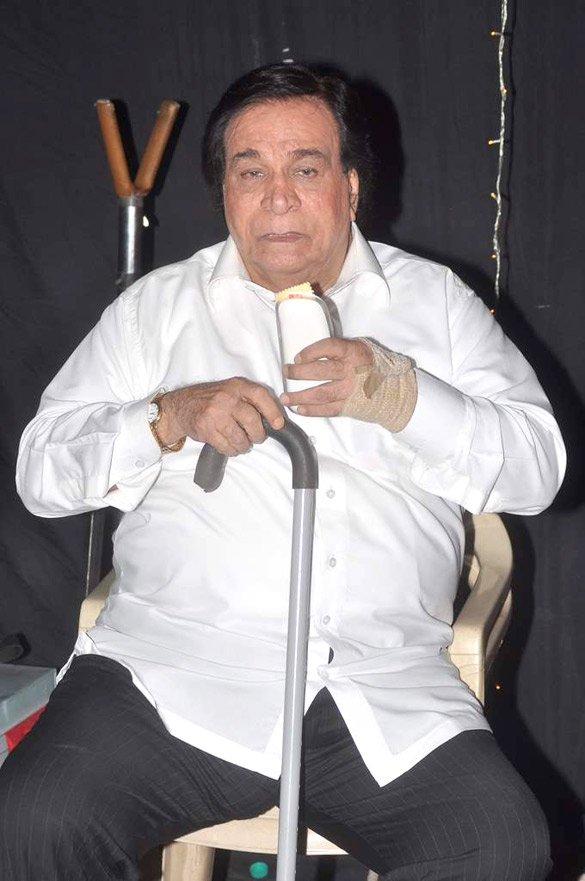
Khan in 2012

Kader Khan (22 October 1937 – 31 December 2018) was an Indian actor, comedian, screenwriter and producer in Bollywood films from the 1970s to the 2010s.

== Actor ==
Year	Title	Role	Notes
1971	Fajr Al Islam	Hindi Narrator	First film
1972	Kasak	Villain	Unreleased film
1973	Daag: A Poem of Love	Prosecuting Attorney	Acting debut
1974	Gupt Gyan	Professor #4	
1974	Benaam	Narrator	Voice
1974	Sagina	Anupam Dutt	
1974	Goonj	Police Inspector	
1974	Dil Diwana	Advocate	
1975	Anari	Viren	
1975	Umar Qaid	Himself	Cameo appearance
1976	Noor-E-Ilaahi	Fakeer Baba	
1976	Zamane Se Poocho	Goon	
1976	Maha Chor	Villain	
1976	Adalat	Police Inspector Khan	
1976	Bairaag	Superintendent of Police	
1977	Hunterwali 77	Goon	
1977	Khoon Pasina	Thakur Zaalim Singh	
1977	Chhailla Babu	Scorpion	Voice
1977	Mukti	Hussain	
1977	Parvarish	Supremo	
1977	Chor Sipahee	Munshilal	
1977	Kasak	Villain	Unreleased film
1977	Tyaag	Narrator	
1977	Agar... If	Davar	
1978	Atyachaar	Goon	
1978	Bhola Bhala	Nathiya	Voice
1978	Khunnus	Goon	
1978	Muqaddar Ka Sikandar	Fakir Darvesh Baba	Cameo appearance
1978	Shalimar	Villain	
1978	Chowki No.11	Krishna / K. K.	
1979	Mr. Natwarlal	Mukhiya / Baba	
1979	Suhaag	Jaggi	
1979	Zulm Ki Pukar	Goon	
1980	Room No. 203	Goon	
1980	Dhan Daulat	Laajo's brother	Cameo appearance
1980	Do Aur Do Paanch	Uncle Jagdish	
1980	Lootmaar	Goon	
1980	Jyoti Bane Jwala	Dharamdas	
1980	Qurbani	Joe	
1980	Be-Reham	P. K.	
1980	Jwalamukhi	P. D.	
1980	Abdullah	Military Officer	
1980	Master Key	Villain	Unreleased film
1980	Unees-Bees	Yakub Khan	
1980	Ganga Aur Suraj	Daku Vikram Singh	
1981	Sadqa Kamliwale Ka	Fakeer	
1981	Kasam Bhawani Ki	Zabbar Chacha	
1981	Raj	Villain	
1981	Bulundi	Madan Teja	
1981	Naseeb	Raghuvir "Raghu"	
1981	Ahista Ahista	Patron	
1981	Yaarana	Johnny	
1981	Shakka	Qasim Bhai	
1981	Shama	Dinoo 'Munshi'	Also producer
1981	Fiffty Fiffty	Diwan Shamsher Singh	
1981	Gehra Zakhm	Magrani	
1981	Meri Aawaz Suno	Topiwala	
1981	Kaalia	Shamu	
1981	Zamane Ko Dikhana Hai	Shekhar Nanda	
1981	Waqt Ki Deewar	Lala Kedarnath	
1981	Raaz	Inspector Khan	
1982	Satte Pe Satta	Narrator	
1982	Maa Ke Aansu	Goon	
1982	Vakil Babu	Man at Court House	Cameo appearance
1982	Teesri Aankh	Baba (Sagar's guardian)	
1982	Desh Premee	Sher Singh	
1982	Sanam Teri Kasam	Ramlal Sharma / Seth Manhorilal	
1982	Badle Ki Aag	Shambu / Rajaram	Double role
1982	Raaj Mahal	Villain	
1982	Waqt-Waqt Ki Baat	Diwan Vikram Singh	
1982	Samraat	Ram and Ranbir's father	
1982	Pyaar Mein Sauda Nahin	Goon	
1982	Mehndi Rang Layegi	Tagore Dindayal	
1982	Lakshmi	Thakur Daaku	
1982	Jeeo Aur Jeene Do	Sher Singh	
1982	Farz Aur Kanoon	Naagraj	
1983	Salam-E-Mohabbat	Goon	
1983	Mangal Pandey	Inspector Vijay Shukla	
1983	Himmatwala	Narayandas Gopaldas "Munimji"	
1983	Mahaan	Simon	
1983	Jaani Dost	Kuber / Cobra	
1983	Woh Jo Hasina	Sardar	
1983	Naukar Biwi Ka	Deshbandu Jagannath / Pinto / Abdul Karim	
1983	Justice Chaudhury	Advocate Kailash	
1983	Mawaali	Ajit	
1983	Coolie	Zafar Khan	
1983	Raaste Aur Rishte	Goon	
1983	Karate	Don Khan	
1983	Kaise Kaise Log	Abbas Khan	
1983	Salam E Mohabbat	Villain	
1983	Chor Police	Dr. Singh	
1983	Film Hi Film	Himself	Special appearance
1984	Mohabbat Ka Masihaa	Goon	
1984	Meri Adalat	Mohan Raj	
1984	Pakhandi	Kader Khan	
1984	Inquilaab	Party Chief Shankar Narayan	
1984	Tohfa	Raghuvir Singh	
1984	Ghar Ek Mandir	Mr. Dharmendras	
1984	Maang Saja Do Meri	Villain	
1984	Maqsad	Naglingam Reddy	
1984	Haisiyat	Ravi's Father	
1984	Gangvaa	Chhote Thakur	
1984	Naya Kadam	Hitler Alok Madhukar	
1984	John Jani Janardhan	Gajanand "Gajju"	
1984	Yaadon Ki Zanjeer	Dharamdas / Thakur Sher Singh	
1984	Sharara	K. K.	
1984	Shapath	Dharamraj	
1984	Qaidi	Bansilal	
1984	Bandh Honth	Goon	
1984	Mera Faisla	Jacob	
1984	Maya Bazar	Himself	Cameo appearance
1984	Kanoon Meri Mutthi Mein	Sher Singh	
1984	Kaamyab	Gulaati	
1984	Jeene Nahi Doonga	Narrator	
1984	Captain Barry	Villain	
1984	Bad Aur Badnam	John / Marco	
1984	Akalmand	Zormi	
1985	Mera Jawab	Inspector Ajay	
1985	Do Dilon Ki Dastan	Goon	
1985	Sarfarosh	Dharmadhikari	
1985	Gautam Govinda	Villain	
1985	Tawaif	Rahim Sheikh	
1985	Ramkali	Thakur Shankar Singh	
1985	Mahaguru	Naagraj Darbari	
1985	Balidaan	Badey	
1985	Pataal Bhairavi	Mantrik	
1985	Ameer Aadmi Gharib Aadmi	Subhash Gaekwad	
1985	Masterji	Jamnadas	
1985	Wafadaar	Namdev Mahadev Rajgiri	
1985	Bepanaah	Dayashankar / Dadu	
1985	Geraftaar	Vidyanath	
1985	Chaar Maharathi	Suleiman	
1985	Lover Boy	Sunder Lal	
1985	Patthar Dil	Shaukeen Lal Chaurasia	
1985	Hoshiyar	Malpani	
1985	Ghar Dwaar	Shyamlal	
1985	Aaj Ka Daur	Vishwapratap Gyandeo Agnihotri	
1986	Dilwaala	Sewakram Sitapuri	
1986	Swarag Se Sunder	Milawat Ram	
1986	Locket	Thakur Veer Pratap Singh	
1986	Albela	Villain	
1986	Dharm Adhikari	Shastri	
1986	Muddat	Thakur Gajendra Singh	
1986	Nasihat	Mohan Lal	
1986	Daku Bijlee	Daku	
1986	Dosti Dushmani	Nishaan	
1986	Suhaagan	Masterji	
1986	Singhasan	Mahamantri Bhanu Pratap	
1986	Inteqam Ki Aag	Kalluram	
1986	Insaaf Ki Awaaz	Politician Chaurangilal Domukhiya	
1986	Ghar Sansar	Girdharilal / Bankelal	
1986	Aag Aur Shola	College Professor	
1987	Sachi Ibadat	Khan Baba	Special appearance
1987	Insaniyat Ke Dushman	Jagmohan	
1987	Khel Tamasha	Goon	
1987	Maa Beti	Shiv Prasad	
1987	Loha	Jagannath Prasad	
1987	Pyaar Karke Dekho	Sampat Srivastav	
1987	Suno Sasurjee	Raj Saxena	
1987	Tera Karam Mera Dharam	Inspector Sinha	
1987	Majaal	Advocate Chaudhary Kailashnath	
1987	Khudgarz	Advocate Batliwala	
1987	Sindoor	Advocate Dharamdas	
1987	Hifazat	Buddhiram	
1987	Himmat Aur Mehanat	Trilok Chand	
1987	Insaf Ki Pukar	Police Inspector Imaandaar	
1987	Watan Ke Rakhwale	Raj Puri	
1987	Naam O Nishan	Thakur Jarnail Singh / Jaspal Singh	
1987	Jawab Hum Denge	Janardan	
1987	Ghar Ka Sukh	Mani Prasad	
1987	Besahara	Nawab Rahim Khan	
1987	Apne Apne	Samrat	
1988	Som Mangal Shani	Noora Seth	
1988	Geeta Ki Saugandh	Sher Khan	
1988	Bijli Aur Toofan	Abdul Bhai	
1988	Dariya Dil	Dhaniram	
1988	Shahenshah	DCP Anand Kumar Srivastav	
1988	Pyar Ka Mandir	Dr. Bhuleshwarchand Bhooljanewala	
1988	Shukriyaa	Narrator	
1988	Kasam	Nathu	
1988	Kab Tak Chup Rahungi	Gangua	
1988	Charnon Ki Saugandh	Chandi Das	
1988	Woh Mili Thi	John	
1988	Sherni	Thakur Dharampal Singh	
1988	Shoorveer	Natwarlal Sharafat Chand	
1988	Ghar Ghar Ki Kahani	Mr. Dhanraj	
1988	Waqt Ki Awaz	Sikander Lal Thakkar	
1988	Soorma Bhopali	Mad Engineer	Cameo appearance
1988	Khoon Bhari Maang	Heeralal	
1988	Biwi Ho To Aisi	Kailash Bhandari	
1988	Ganga Tere Desh Mein	Sewaram	
1988	Paigham	Daaku	
1988	Sone Pe Suhaaga	Bashir Ahmed	
1988	Saazish	Dr. Kalidas	
1988	Pyaar Mohabbat	Seth Dhaniram	
1988	Mulzim	Jaago Rajwal	
1988	Mar Mitenge	Pasha	
1988	Inteqam	Narayan	
1988	Bhed Bhav	Fakeer Baba	Cameo appearance
1988	Aurat Teri Yehi Kahani	Ghadbad	
1989	Izhaar	Villain	
1989	Vardi	Lalchand / Balkishan	
1989	Gair Kaanooni	Deepak Dalal	
1989	Bade Ghar Ki Beti	Munimji	
1989	Majboor	Teli Ram / Chameli Ram	
1989	Nishane Bazi	Police Officer	
1989	Albela	Villain	
1989	Billoo Baadshah	Thanthan Tiwari	
1989	Jaisi Karni Waisi Bharni	Gangaram Verma	
1989	Paraya Ghar	Kudrat Miyan	
1989	Junga	Goon	Unreleased film
1989	Dost	Buddhi (Sher's Nephew)	
1989	Sikka	Daruka	
1989	Kala Bazaar	Kimtilal	
1989	Kanoon Apna Apna	Bhushannath 'Dharmendra' Bhadbole	
1989	Chaalbaaz	Fake Beggar	Cameo appearance
1989	Tujhe Nahin Chhodunga	Villain	
1989	Teri Payal Mere Geet	C.I. Jhanjhotia	
1989	Garibon Ka Data	Zamindaar	
1989	Hum Bhi Insaan Hain	Dharampal	
1989	Awara Zindagi	Boss	
1990	Meri Lalkaar	Top Singh Hawaldar	
1990	Baap Numbri Beta Dus Numbri	Raman	
1990	Sher Dil	Shobraj / Lobhraj	
1990	Apmaan Ki Aag	Retd. Col. Suryadev Singh	
1990	Shera Shamshera	Chhabildas	
1990	Shandar	Rai Bahadur Arjun Chaurasia	
1990	Qayamat Ki Raat	Goon	
1990	Pyar Ka Karz	Havaldar / Sub-Inspector Nakedar Subedar Thandedar Sapotdar	
1990	Shararat	Goon	
1990	Pyar Ka Devta	Pritam	
1990	Muqaddar Ka Badshaah	Inspector Gulshan	
1990	Jawani Zindabad	Balmukut Mama Banarasi	
1990	Kishen Kanhaiya	Munshi	
1990	Ghar Ho To Aisa	Bajrangi / Bajrangi's Father	
1991	Princess from Kathmandu	Comedian	
1991	Hum	General Rana Pratap Singh / Chittor	Double role
1991	Khoon Ka Karz	Champaklal / Hitler Champaklal / Ravan Champaklal	
1991	Rin Shodh	Daaku	
1991	Karz Chukana Hai	Atmaram	
1991	Ramwati	Hawaldar Krishen	
1991	Do Matwale	Gorakhnath	
1991	Nachnewale Gaanewale	Jaggu	
1991	Swarg Yahan Narak Yahan	Jagatram	
1991	Indrajeet	Minister 'Manti' Sadachari	
1991	Saajan	Rajiv Verma	
1991	Yaara Dildara	Police Inspector Lele	
1991	Trinetra	Shyam	
1991	Sapnon Ka Mandir	Maula Baba	
1991	Phoolwati	Hawaldaar	
1991	Ghar Parivar	Munshi	
1991	Ganga Jamuna Ki Lalkaar	Daaku	
1992	Rajoo Dada	Don Jwala	
1992	Meri Janeman	Makkhan Lal	
1992	Dil Hi To Hai	Thakur Karan Singh	
1992	Swarg Se Pyara Ghar Hamara	Kader Khan	
1992	Vansh	Havaldar Imandar	
1992	Mera Dil Tere Liye	Principal Sinha	
1992	Suryavanshi	Baba	
1992	Aurat Ki Adalat	Goon	Shelved film
1992	Parasmani	Daku Ibrahim Khan / Baba Malang	
1992	Rishta Ho To Aisa	Girdharilal	
1992	Qatil Ki Talash	Villain	Bilingual film; Shelved film
1992	Basanti Tangewali	Police Inspector / Khan	
1992	Tyagi	Choudhry Gangaprasad Dayal	
1992	Ganga Bani Shola	Police Commissioner	
1992	Bol Radha Bol	Jugnu	
1992	Honeymoon	Dhaniram	
1992	Humshakal	D.D. / Devi Dutt / Dard Ka Dariya	
1992	Angaar	Jahangir Khan	
1992	Ghar Jamai	Pyarelal	
1992	Kamsin	Chacha Ji	
1992	Daulat Ki Jung	K.K. Topji / Sher Khan	
1992	Umar 55 Ki Dil Bachpan Ka	Dhaniram / Maniram	
1992	Nagin Aur Lootere	Thief	
1992	Maa	Ravikant	
1992	Yeh Hai Ghar Ki Mahabharata	Ramesh’s father	
1992	Kasak	Hasmukh Sharma	
1992	Insaaf Ki Devi	Advocate Kanooni Lal	
1992	Ganga Ki Vachan	Daaku	
1993	Apaatkaal	Mungeri Lal	
1993	Kayda Kanoon	Mirza Lucknowi	
1993	Badi Bahen	Ram	
1993	Chahoonga Main Tujhe	Raju's father	
1993	Rang	Mahadev Singh	
1993	Dil Hai Betaab	Parshuram	
1993	Gurudev	Inspector Khan	
1993	Hum Hain Kamaal Ke	Pitambar	
1993	Dil Tera Aashiq	Naseeb Kumar	
1993	Aulad Ke Dushman	Ahuja	
1993	Dhanwan	Jagmohan Chopra	
1993	Shatranj	Dharamraj D. Verma	
1993	Zakhmo Ka Hisaab	Gyaani	
1993	Meherbaan	Biku	
1993	Jeevan Ki Shatranj	Havaldar No.100	
1993	Dosti Ki Saugandh	Kader Khan	
1993	Chahoonga Main Tujhe	Seth Pyaare Lal	
1993	Aashik Awara	Jaggu	
1993	Aankhen	Hasmukh Rai / Hasmukh's twin brother	Double role
1994	Rakhwale	Police Commissioner	
1994	Raja Babu	Kishan Singh	
1994	Prem Shakti	Romeo	
1994	Insaaf Apne Lahoo Se	Hardwari Lal	
1994	Saajan Ka Ghar	Uncle	
1994	Pehla Pehla Pyar	Dharam Pal / Streetside Vendor / Grocer	Multiple roles
1994	Mohabbat Ki Arzoo	Dr. Anand	
1994	Aatish	Kader Bhai	
1994	Eena Meena Deeka	Dabba (Beggar)	
1994	Watan	Villain	
1994	Aag	Tolaram	
1994	Main Khiladi Tu Anari	DCP / Constable Ramlal	
1994	Ghar Ki Izzat	Ram Kumar	
1994	Mr. Azaad	Hiravat Mishra	
1994	Khuddar	Kanhaiyalal	
1994	Chhoti Bahoo	Durga's Husband	
1994	Andaz	Principal Magan Lal	
1995	The Don	Chaprasi Rajaram / Principal Amarnath / Professor Raghav	
1995	Taqdeerwala	Yamraj	
1995	Anokha Andaaz	B.S. Khanna	
1995	Taaqat	Master Dinanath	
1995	Coolie No. 1	Choudhry Hoshiarchand Shikarpuri Bakulwala	
1995	Hulchul	Chachaji	
1995	Maidan-E-Jung	Maganlal	
1995	Oh Darling! Yeh Hai India!	Bidder	
1995	Jallaad	Kamalkanth	
1995	Veer	Agarwal / Advocate Vishwanath	
1995	Yaraana	Rai Saheb	
1995	Diya Aur Toofan	Gyaneshwar	
1995	Vartmaan	Professor	
1995	Surakshaa	Manager	
1995	Jallaad	Kamalnath/K.K.	
1996	Sindoor Ki Holi	Inspector Munne Khan	
1996	Saajan Chale Sasural	Mr. Khurana	
1996	Maahir	Jailor	
1996	Rangbaaz	Judge Kapoor / Father Kanhaya	
1996	Sapoot	Mr. Singhania	
1996	Chhote Sarkar	Jagmohan / ACP Chandra Bedi	
1996	Ek Tha Raja	Lalchand Dogra	
1996	Hukumnama	Villain	
1996	Bhishma	Jaunpuri	
1996	Aatank	D'Costa	
1997	Allah Meharban To Gadha Pehalwan	Havaldaar Imaandar Singh	
1997	Judaai	Kaajal's Father	
1997	Judwaa	Kishan Sharma	
1997	Hero No. 1	Dhanraj Malhotra	
1997	Banarasi Babu	Mr. Chaubey	
1997	Zameer	Astrologer Ram Prasad	
1997	Tarazu	Dr. Khan Hindustani	
1997	Ek Phool Teen Kante	Kidnapper Khopadi	
1997	Hameshaa	Raju's Chacha	
1997	Deewana Mastana	Marriage Registrar	
1997	Mr. and Mrs. Khiladi	Badri Prasad	
1997	Bhai	Inspector Lalit Kapoor	
1997	Shapath	Chaurasiya	
1997	Sanam	Khan Bahadur	
1997	Naseeb	Master Chaban	
1997	Daadagiri	Dinanath	
1997	Bhoot Bhungla	Khan Baba	
1998	Maha-Yuddh	Chacha Sohanlal Khanna	
1998	Aag Aur Tezaab	Conman	
1998	Jaane Jigar	Ghanshyam	
1998	Aunty No. 1	Rai Bahadur Behl	
1998	Jiyaala	Nana Bhai	
1998	Mard	Minister Gulam Kalim Azad	
1998	Angaar Vadee	Villain	
1998	Naseeb	Master Chaban	
1998	Gharwali Baharwali	Hiralal Verma	
1998	Dulhe Raja	K.K. Singhania	
1998	Bade Miyan Chote Miyan	Waiter / Kadar Bhai	
1998	Hero Hindustani	Topi	
1998	Kudrat	Dada Ji	
1998	Tirchhi Topiwale	Sanam's dad	
1998	Phool Bane Patthar	Choudhry Bhavani Singh / Dadhu	
1998	Mere Do Anmol Ratan	Major Bhagawat Singh	
1999	Sikandar Sadak Ka	Mr. Dilchasp	
1999	Aa Ab Laut Chalen	Sardaar Khan	
1999	Anari No. 1	K.K.	
1999	Sooryavansham	Major Ranjeet Singh	
1999	Rajaji	Sarpanch Shivnath	
1999	Inteqam Aurat Ka	Goon	
1999	Haseena Maan Jaayegi	Seth Amirchand	
1999	Hindustan Ki Kasam	Dr. Dastoor	
1999	Sanyasi Mera Naam	Bhootnath	
1999	Jaanwar	Singer at Temple	
1999	Sirf Tum	Phone Booth Operator	
1999	Nyaydaata	Yaadram	
2000	Dulhan Hum Le Jayenge	Mr. Oberoi	
2000	Krodh	Balwant	
2000	Joru Ka Ghulam	Dyaneshwarprasad Pitamber	
2000	Kunwara	Vishwanath Pratap Singh	
2000	Dhadkan	Singer (In the song Dulhe Ka Shehra)	Special appearance
2000	Tera Jadoo Chal Gayaa	Mr. Oberoi	
2000	Billa No. 786	Sufi Singer	
2001	Ittefaq	Gujjumal Hiranandani	
2001	Dial 100	Kamal Bihari	
2001	Galiyon Ka Badshah	Villain	
2002	Haan Maine Bhi Pyaar Kiya	Babban Miyan	
2002	Badhaai Ho Badhaai	Ghuman Singh Rathod	
2002	Yeh Hai Jalwa	Purshottam Mittal	
2002	Raat Ke Saudagar	Daaku	
2002	Akhiyon Se Goli Maare	Akhendra "Topichand" Bhangare / Rana Bishambharnath	
2002	Waah! Tera Kya Kehna	Murari	
2002	Jeena Sirf Merre Liye	Mahendra Malhotra	
2002	Chalo Ishq Ladaaye	Kokibhai	
2002	Sindoor Ki Saugandh	Majid Shola / Inspector Asli Tandoor Khan	
2002	Angaar: The Fire	Doctor K.K.	
2003	Basti	Narrator	
2003	Parwana	Ismailbhai Muskurahat	
2003	Fun2shh	Bhaleram / Goatherd	
2004	Kaun Hai Jo Sapno Mein Aaya	Kuldeep Khanna	
2004	Suno Sasurjee	Raj K. Saxena	
2004	Bazaar: Market of Love, Lust and Desire	Kader Khan	
2004	Mujhse Shaadi Karogi	Mr. O.B. Duggal	
2005	Lucky	Doctor	
2005	Khullam Khulla Pyaar Karen	Goverdhan	
2005	Koi Mere Dil Mein Hai	Vikram Malhotra	
2005	Dhadkanein	Dadu	
2006	Family	Kalim Khan	
2006	Jigyaasa	Nand Kishore / Nanduji	
2006	Umar	Iqbal Khan	
2007	Undertrial	Advocate Ravi Vishnoi	
2007	Old Iss Gold	Jayprakash Mital	
2007	Jahan Jaaeyega Hamen Paaeyega	Kiran's dad	
2008	Mehbooba	Advocate Sahid	
2008	Deshdrohi	Abdul – Fruit vendor	
2009	Hamara Parivar	Villain	Delayed release
2010	Mere Garib Nawaz	Villain	
2013	Desh Pardesh	Dada	Bhojpuri film
2013	Deewana Main Deewana	Basant's Dad	
2013	Saawariya - Khatu Shyam Ji Ki Amar Gatha	Kishan Chand	
2014	Dil Bhi Khaali Jeb Bhi Khaali	Kader Khan	
2014	Zilla Kannauj	Faqir	
2014	Kunba	Kader Bhai	
2014	Ungli	Sunil	
2015	Hogaya Dimaagh Ka Dahi	Ishwar Singh Chauhan	
2015	International Hero	Kader Khan	
2015	An Unfold Fact Lateef	Police Commissioner	
2015	Don	Godfather	
2016	Aman Ke Farishtey	Colonel Ranjeet	Delayed release
2017	Masti Nahi Sasti	Advocate Vidyapati Mishr	
2020	Main Hoon Khalnayak	Villain	Delayed release
2021	Deewaane	Villain	Delayed release

== Producer ==
- Shama (1981)

== Screenwriter & Dialogues ==
- Jawani Diwani (1972)
- Rafuchakkar (1972)
- Benaam (1974)
- Roti (1974)
- The Runaways (1975)
- Maha Chor (1976)
- Chhailla Babu (1977)
- Amar Akbar Anthony (1977)
- Chalta Purza (1977)
- Khoon Pasina (1977)
- Dharam Veer (1977)
- Parvarish (1977)
- Mukti (1977)
- Khel Khel Mein (1977)
- Kasak (Unreleased film) (1977)
- Muqaddar Ka Sikandar (1978)
- Shalimar (1978)
- Suhaag (1979)
- Mr. Natwarlal (1979)
- Do Aur Do Paanch (1980)
- Qurbani (1980)
- Abdullah (1980)
- Jwalamukhi (1980)
- Bombay 405 Miles (1980)
- Naseeb (1981)
- Yaarana (1981)
- Lawaaris (1981)
- Shama (1981)
- Fiffty Fiffty (1981)
- Katilon Ke Kaatil (1981)
- Meri Aawaz Suno (1981)
- Jail Yatra (1981)
- Shakka (1981)
- Satte Pe Satta (1982)
- Desh Premee (1982)
- Khud-Daar (1982)
- Namak Halaal (1982)
- Farz Aur Kanoon (1982)
- Sanam Teri Kasam (1982)
- Dharam Kanta (1982)
- Himmatwala (1983)
- Mahaan (1983)
- Jaani Dost (1983)
- Justice Chaudhury (1983)
- Ghungroo (1983)
- Coolie (1983)
- Meri Adalat (1984)
- Inquilaab (1984)
- Kaamyab (1984)
- Maqsad (1984)
- Qaidi (1984)
- Sharaabi (1984)
- Haisiyat (1984)
- Andar Baahar (1984)
- Gangvaa (1984)
- Mera Faisla (1984)
- Akalmand (1984)
- Sarfarosh (1985)
- Mera Jawab (1985)
- Hoshiyar (1985)
- Geraftaar (1985)
- Ramkali (1985)
- Lover Boy (1985)
- Balidaan (1985)
- Mahaguru (1985)
- Aaj Ka Daur (1985)
- Pataal Bhairavi (1985)
- Ek Se Bhale Do (1985)
- Wafadaar (1985)
- Singhasan (1986)
- Swarag Se Sunder (1986)
- Ghar Sansar (1986)
- Suhagan (1986)
- Karma (1986)
- Nasihat (1986)
- Muddat (1986)
- Sultanat (1986)
- Dilwaala (1986)
- Watan Ke Rakhwale (1987)
- Majaal (1987)
- Loha (1987)
- Muqaddar Ka Faisla (1987)
- Hifazat (1987)
- Himmat Aur Mehanat (1987)
- Hatya (1988)
- Waqt Ki Awaz (1988)
- Gangaa Jamunaa Saraswati (1988)
- Khoon Bhari Maang (1988)
- Dariya Dil (1988)
- Sone Pe Suhaaga (1988)
- Shoorveer (1988)
- Charanon Ki Saugandh (1988)
- Pyar Ka Mandir (1988)
- Gair Kaanooni (1989)
- Bade Ghar Ki Beti (1989)
- Sikka (1989)
- Kanoon Apna Apna (1989)
- Jaisi Karni Waisi Bharnii (1989)
- Dost (1989)
- Baap Numbri Beta Dus Numbri (1990)
- Ghar Ho To Aisa (1990)
- Kishen Kanhaiya (1990)
- Agneepath (1990)
- Hum (1991)
- Indrajeet (1991)
- Khoon Ka Karz (1991)
- Qurbani Rang Layegi (1991)
- Honeymoon (1992)
- Hamshakal (1992)
- Angaar (1992)
- Chahoonga Main Tujhe (1993)
- Shatranj (1993)
- Main Khiladi Tu Anari (1994)
- Insaaf Apne Lahoo Se (1994)
- Ghar Ki Izzat (1994)
- Taqdeerwala (1995)
- Diya Aur Toofan (1995)
- Surakshaa (1995)
- Coolie No. 1 (1995)
- Saajan Chale Sasural (1996)
- Bhai (1997)
- Aunty No. 1 (1998)
- Hero Hindustani (1998)
- Anari No.1 (1999)
- Rajaji (1999)
- Yeh Raaste Hain Pyaar Ke (2001)

== Television ==
Year	Title	Role	Notes
1997–1998	Mr. Dhansukh	Mr. Dhansukh / Mansukh	Double role
2000	Hasna Mat	Various characters	
2011–2012	Hi! Padosi... Kaun Hai Doshi?	Ram Bharose	
