= Yarr =

Yarr may refer to:

- Tommy Yarr (1910–1941), American football player
- Yarr Radio
- Yarr, a character in W.I.T.C.H., an Italian comic series
- Youngstown and Austintown Railroad
- Spergula arvensis, sometimes referred to in New Zealand as yarr

== See also ==
- Yar (disambiguation)
- International Talk Like a Pirate Day
