= Yar =

Yar, Yare or Yars may refer to:

== Geography ==
- Yar, Russia, name of several inhabited localities in Russia
- Babi Yar, a ravine in Kyiv where mass murders took place during World War II
- Eastern Yar, a river on the Isle of Wight, England
- Western Yar, a river on the Isle of Wight, England
- River Yare, a river in East Anglia, England
- Yemen Arab Republic (YAR)

== Enterprises ==
- Yar (restaurant), Moscow

== Art, entertainment, and media ==
- Tasha Yar, a fictional character on Star Trek: The Next Generation
- Yars' Revenge and subsequent titles in the Yars series of video games
- Yar, a lemur in the 2000 Disney animated film Dinosaur

== Biology ==
- Yar (gene), a long non-coding RNA gene found in Drosophila
- YARS, a human gene that encodes the enzyme Tyrosine—tRNA ligase

== See also ==
- RS-24 Yars, a Russian intercontinental ballistic missile
- Yaar? (disambiguation)
