= Sahasa Simha =

- Poster
- Directed by: Joe Simon
- Screenplay by: Joe Simon
- Based on: Chakravyuha by Manu
- Produced by: M. Pandurangan; M. Ramalingam
- Starring: Vishnuvardhan; Kajal Kiran; Rajya Lakshmi; Vajramuni
- Cinematography: H. G. Raju
- Edited by: P. Venkateshwara Ravu
- Music by: Satyam
- Production company: Sri Lakshmi Cine Productions
- Distributed by: Sri Lakshmi Cine Productions
- Release date: 10 February 1982
- Running time: 164 minutes
- Country: India
- Language: Kannada

Sahasa Simha (transl. Adventurous/Brave Lion) is a 1982 Indian Kannada-language action crime film directed by Joe Simon and produced by M. Pandurangan and M. Ramalingam. The film stars Vishnuvardhan, Kajal Kiran, Rajya Lakshmi, Dheerendra Gopal, Thoogudeepa Srinivas, Vajramuni and Tiger Prabhakar. The music was composed by Satyam, with cinematography and editing were handled by H. G. Raju and P. Venkateshwara Ravu.

The film is based on the novel Chakravyuha by Manu, which itself is inspired by Ronald Neame's film The Odessa File (1974) that was adapted from the 1972 novel of the same name by Frederick Forsyth. Sahasa Simha was released on 10 February 1982 and was a huge success at the box office.

== Plot ==
Prathap, a police officer in Bangalore, lives with his sister Lakshmi. They were raised by Pratap's superior, Chowdhary, who treats them as his own children. One day, Prathap and Chowdhary investigate the murder of a man named Dheerajlal and discover a diary. It reveals Dheerajlal’s real identity as Shankaralal who had been involved with a criminal gang led by Rathanlal and Peter, that ran a child trafficking racket. After witnessing the gang’s brutal activities, including an acid attack on a child, Shankaralal had felt guilty and decided to leave the gang.

Prathap seeks Chowdhary's approval to go undercover and bring down the gang. He travels to Mumbai, and meets Nandanlal from the Mumbai Police Department. Nandanlal reveals that Rathanlal and Peter died in an accident 25 years ago. Prathap meets his new superior, Chakravarthy, who explains that Inspector Gopal Rao, had been assigned to capture Rathanlal and Peter but had also died in the same accident.

Prathap finds out that Nandanlal is connected to Shankarlal. Prathap gets captured by crime bosses Robert and Jeevanlal, who demand to know the reason for inquiries about Rathanlal and Peter. Prathap discovers that Nandanlal is working with them. Prathap fabricates a story and joins the gang, to escape execution. He learns about the gang's operations but his deception is exposed. In a bid to protect himself, Prathap uses Shankaralal’s diary to prove his knowledge of the gang’s activities.

Nandanlal reveals that Jeevanlal and Robert are actually Rathanlal and Peter, who faked their deaths after killing Gopal Rao in a car accident. Prathap reveals that Shankaralal's death was orchestrated by Rathanlal and Peter. Prathap escapes with the help of Nandanlal. Nandanlal kills Peter to avenge his father's death but is later killed by Rathanlal.

Prathap meets Chakravarthy, presents his findings, and plans to raid the gang’s hideout. His sister Lakshmi who arrives in Mumbai to meet him is confronted by Vijay (Rathanlal's son). Lakshmi kills Vijay in self-defense. Vijay's associates capture Lakshmi. Prathap arrives at the hideout to find Lakshmi dead. Enraged, he attacks Rathanlal and his associates. Prathap unmasks himself and declares that he is Gopal Rao’s son who had suffered an acid attack. He then violently confronts a terrified Rathanlal, who dies.

== Cast ==
- Vishnuvardhan as Prathap
- Kajal Kiran as Rekha
- Rajyalakshmi as Lakshmi
- Vajramuni as Shankarlal/Dheerajlal
- Dheerendra Gopal as Ratanlal/Jeevanlal
- Thoogudeepa Srinivas as Peter/Robert
- Shakti Prasad as Chakravarthy
- Tiger Prabhakar as Nandanlal
- Sudheer as Inspector Gopal Rao
- Arikesari
- Udaykumar as Chaudhary (cameo)
- Chethan Ramarao in a cameo
- Ramanujam in a cameo
- Nithyanand in a cameo
- Vinodkumar
- Dr Rudresh
- Negro Johnny
- Gopalakrishna
- Jr Narasimharaju

== Production ==
Joe Simon, in an interview when asked about his experiences while filming Sahasa Simha, said that at the climactic scene Vishnuvardhan was supposed to pass through a tunnel and at the end of the tunnel he was supposed to climb bricks and push a chamber cover to go outside. He said that the tunnel had insufficient oxygen to breathe. Most of the crew including the director, cameraman and technicians started to feel breathless and finally he decided not to continue and to shoot the climax in a studio, but Vishnuvardhan insisted that the shot be completed then and there and asked the director to continue with the shooting. Finally the shooting of the climax was completed on the same day.

== Soundtrack ==
The music was composed by Satyam.

No.	Song	Singers	Lyrics	Length (m:ss)
1	"Mareyada Nenapanu"	S. P. Balasubrahmanyam	R. N. Jayagopal	04:24
2	"Innu Endu"	S. P. Balasubrahmanyam, S. Janaki	Chi. Udaya Shankar	04:23
3	"Bittare Sigalaara"	S. P. Balasubrahmanyam	Chi. Udaya Shankar	03:42
4	"Hegiddaru"	Vishnuvardhan, Renuka	Chi. Udaya Shankar	03:46

== Reception ==
Sahasa Simha received critical acclaim for its plot, the performances of Vishnuvardhan and Thoogudeepa Srinivas and the action sequences. The film was a turning point in Vishnuvardhan's career and catapulted him into superstardom. Following the success of the film, a series of similar action films were made with Vishnuvardhan in the lead role. The film has over the years attained a cult status in Karnataka.

== Re-release ==
The film was re-released on 13 May 2016 and became the first of Vishnuvardhan's films to be re-released. The film was released in CinemaScope with 5.1 D.T.S sound. Upon re-release, the film received good response on the opening day, where it saw theatres having large cutout posters of Vishnuvardhan with fans flooding the movie halls.

== Legacy ==
Sahasa Simha is considered to be the turning point in Vishnuvardhan's career as it shot him into superstardom in Kannada cinema. Even the dialogues from the movie are still famous. The success of the film bestowed the title of Sahasa Simha and The Angry Young Man of Kannada Cinema on him. The film inspired a comic book series titled Sahasa Simha Comic series. The comic revolves around Detective Sahasa Simha who solves mysteries with the help of his grandchildren and fights stemmed through social issues. The protagonist of the comic is based on Vishnuvardhan whereas the grandchildren's characters are based upon the Vishnuvardhan's real-life grandkids Jyestavardhan and Shloka.
