= Mirchi =

Mirchi may refer to:

- Mirchi bada, spicy Indian doughnut
- Mirchi ka salan, chilli curry
- Mirchi (film), 2013 Indian film
- Iqbal Mirchi (1950–2013), Indian drug kingpin
- Radio Mirchi, Indian radio network
  - Mirchi Music Awards
