= Dial 100 =

Dial 100 refers to:

- 100 (emergency telephone number) or 112 (emergency telephone number), in India including for the police
- Dial 100 (1982 film), by S. Ramanathan
- Dial 100 (2001 film), starring Kader Khan
- Dial 100 (TV series), a television series aired on Indian satellite channel SAB TV
- Dial 100 (2021 film), an Indian Hindi-language thriller drama film
