= Aakhri Sanghursh =

- Poster
- Directed by: Narendra Bedi
- Produced by: G. M. Patel
- Starring: Vijayendra Ghatge; Kajal Kiran; Mukesh Khanna
- Music by: Hemant Bhosle
- Production companies: G. M. Productions; Jawahar Picture Palace
- Release date: 24 January 1997
- Country: India
- Language: Hindi

Aakhri Sanghursh is a 1997 Indian Hindi-language action film directed by Narendra Bedi and produced by G. M. Patel. The film stars Vijayendra Ghatge, Kajal Kiran, Mukesh Khanna in the key roles. This film was made in 1982, but due to director Narendra Bedi's death, the film had a delayed release in 1997 under the banner of G. M. Productions and Jawahar Picture Palace.

== Plot ==
Shakti Singh, a poor, hardworking boiler mechanic who lives a happy life with his wife Seeta, mother, and two sons, Arjun and Vijay. Shakti always falsely fights against injustice. Once he is falsely implicated for this, and he has to go to jail. Seeta is forced to be a courtesan instead of the money owed by Shekhar, so a misunderstanding creates between Shakti and Seeta; insulted Seeta leaves the house. Shakti realises his mistakes, but it's too late; soon he takes the path of crime and becomes an underworld don. After some years, his two sons, Arjun, are married to Kajal and Vijay to Aarti. Kajal does not like his father-in-law as he is involved in illegal activities; Arjun is self-employed; Vijay has some bad habits for which he often quarrels with his father. Shakti has enemies and traitors in his business. The situation worsens when Vijay is killed.

== Cast ==
- Vijayendra Ghatge as Arjun Singh
- Kajal Kiran as Kajal Singh
- Mukesh Khanna as Shakti Singh
- Shakti Kapoor as Vijay Singh
- Jeevan as Lawyer Shakaal
- Helen as Meena
- Heena Kausar as Aarti Singh
- Sarika as Seeta Singh
- Viju Khote as Shankar
- Dinesh Thakur as Dinesh
- Pinchoo Kapoor as Mr. Patel
- Kamal Kapoor as, Khanna Patel's Partner
- Om Shivpuri as Rammohan Patel's Partner
- Narendranath as Shekhar
- Sudhir as Baggu
- Kalpana Iyer as Baggu's Girlfriend

== Soundtrack ==
| Song | Singer |
|---|---|
| "Diya Dil Tujhko Diya, Kiya Tujhe Pyar Kiya" | Kishore Kumar, Asha Bhosle |
| "Shukriya Shukriya" | Lata Mangeshkar |
| "Woh Sharaab Hai" | Asha Bhosle |
| "Nasha Hi Nasha Hai" | Asha Bhosle |
| "Aanchal Pe Tera Hi Naam Likha, Kaajal Mein Teri Tasveer Bani" | Asha Bhosle, Mohammed Rafi |
