= Heena Kausar =

Indian actress

- Born: Mumbai, India
- Occupation: Actress
- Years active: 1971–1998
- Spouse: Iqbal Mirchi (1991-2013)

Heena Kausar is an Indian actress who appeared in several Hindi language films in the 1970s. She is the widow of the Indian gangster and underworld don Iqbal Mirchi.

== Biography ==
Kausar is the daughter of filmmaker K. Asif, famous as the producer and director of the epic film Mughal-e-Azam, by his third wife, the actress Nigar Sultana, who played the role of Bahaar in that film.

Kausar wanted to become an actress like her mother. Her father had died in 1971, just as Kausar was beginning her career, and this was a serious blow to her career dreams. Her father had few real friends in the film industry, and many who disliked him. Kausar took up whatever work was available and appeared in minor roles in a number of films, however failing in getting heroine roles.

In 1991, Kausar married the Indian gangster and underworld figure Iqbal Mirchi, becoming his second wife. She gave up acting and moved abroad to live with Mirchi. Her two subsequent releases were filmed before her marriage. The marriage was childless, and Mirchi died of natural causes in 2013. Kausar continues to reside in the United Kingdom after her husband's death.

== Filmography ==
Year	Title	Role	Notes
1970	Holi Ayee Re		
1971	Dost Aur Dushman		
1972	Jeet		
1972	Parivartan		
1972	Wafaa		
1972	Pakeezah		
1972	Shahar Se Door		
1973	Door Nahin Manzil		
1973	Ek Naav Kinare Do		
1974	Dost		
1974	Call Girl		
1974	Majboor		
1975	Dayar-e-Madina		
1975	Gupt Shastra		
1976	Kitne Paas Kitne Door		
1976	Shahi Lutera		
1976	Nagin		
1976	Ladki Bholi Bhali		
1977	Aadalat		
1977	Jai Bolo Chakradhari		
1977	Paapi		
1977	Parvarish		
1978	College Girl		
1978	Main Tulsi Tere Aangan Ki		
1980	Jaagal Bhag Hamaar		Bhojpuri film
1980	Choron Ki Baaraat		
1980	Sister		
1981	Chanwa Ke Take Chakor		Bhojpuri film
1981	Ganga Maang Rahi Balidan		
1981	Kaalia		
1981	Jail Yatra		
1981	Khoon Ka Rishta		
1981	Roohi		
1981	Madine Ki Galian		
1982	Ayaash		
1982	Nikaah		
1982	Pyaara Dost		
1982	Teri Maang Sitaron Se Bhar Doon		
1982	Bura Aadmi		
1982	Jeeo Aur Jeene Do		
1982	Dharam Kanta		
1982	Chambal Ke Daku		
1983	Lalach		
1983	Razia Sultan		
1984	Aaj Ka M.L.A. Ram Avtar		
1984	Wanted: Dead or Alive		
1984	Sulagte Armaan		
1984	Pet Pyaar Aur Paap		
1984	Hum Do Hamare Do		
1984	Bhemaa		
1984	Captain Barry		
1985	Paanch Khiladi		
1985	Vairi-Jatt		
1986	Waapsi		
1986	Pahunchey Huwe Log		
1986	Mazloom	Neelam Jaspal	
1986	Raat Ke Baad		
1988	Sila		
1989	Mirza Ki Shaadi		
1992	Rajoo Dada	Munni	
1997	Aakhri Sanghursh	Aarti Singh	Filmed in 1982; Released in 1997
1998	Ghar Bazar		
