= Aurat Aurat Aurat =

1996 film

- Directed by: K. Viswanath
- Starring: Rekha; Rakesh Roshan; Vinod Mehra
- Music by: Laxmikant-Pyarelal
- Release date: 16 February 1996
- Country: India
- Language: Hindi

Aurat Aurat Aurat is a 1996 Bollywood film starring Rekha. The film also stars Rakesh Roshan, Vinod Mehra, Aruna Irani and Sadashiv Amrapurkar. Directed by K. Viswanath, filming began in 1979, but was delayed and later completed in 1994. Released in 1996, the film was one of many of Vinod Mehra's posthumous releases as he died six years before the film's release.

== Plot ==
Seeta (Rekha) is standing trial for the murder of Brij (Sadashiv Amrapurkar). In flashbacks it is revealed what drove her to commit murder.

Rakesh (Rakesh Roshan), a spoilt rich man, fell in love with her. She was engaged to Vijay (Vinod Mehra). Rakesh got Vijay killed by hiring Brij. Seeta moved on with her life, devastated by her fiancé's death. She marries a barrister named Vajpayee (Shreeram Lagoo) and is shocked when she discovers by coincidence that her husband's son from a previous marriage is Rakesh.

== Cast ==
- Rekha as Seeta Vajpayee
- Rakesh Roshan as Rakesh Vajpayee
- Vinod Mehra as Vijay
- Aruna Irani as Aruna
- Neeta Mehta as Savitri
- Shreeram Lagoo as Barrister Vajpayee
- Sadashiv Amrapurkar as Brij

== Music ==
The music composed by Laxmikant-Pyarelal with lyrics by Anand Bakshi.

Song	Singer
"Chhota Sa Ghar Banaye" (Happy)	Lata Mangeshkar, Talat Aziz
"Chhota Sa Ghar Banaye" (Sad)	Lata Mangeshkar, Talat Aziz
"Bolo Jai Seetaram"	Asha Bhosle
"Rota Hai Fariyad Karta"	Anuradha Paudwal
"Ae Aurat" (Male)	Vinod Rathod
"Ae Aurat" (Female)	Kavita Krishnamurthy
"Sab Ka Daman Chhodke"	Kavita Krishnamurthy

== Reception ==
New Straits Times said in a review of Aurat Aurat Aurat that "The first hour was dreadfully slow moving" but noted that the second half "was so much better". The review went on to lament that director Vishwanath "should have made his heroine tougher and given more room for Rekha to be expressive and display her emotions".
