= Yar, Russia =

Yar (Russian: Яр) is the name of several rural localities in Russia:

- Yar, Baykalovsky District, Sverdlovsk Oblast, a village in Baykalovsky District, Sverdlovsk Oblast
- Yar, Talitsky District, Sverdlovsk Oblast, a selo in Talitsky District, Sverdlovsk Oblast
- Yar, Tugulymsky District, Sverdlovsk Oblast, a selo in Tugulymsky District, Sverdlovsk Oblast
- Yar, Turinsky District, Sverdlovsk Oblast, a village in Turinsky District, Sverdlovsk Oblast
- Yar, Tomsk Oblast, a selo in Tomsky District of Tomsk Oblast
- Yar, Tyumensky District, Tyumen Oblast, a selo in Yembayevsky Rural Okrug of Tyumensky District of Tyumen Oblast
- Yar, Uvatsky District, Tyumen Oblast, a village in Alymsky Rural Okrug of Uvatsky District of Tyumen Oblast
- Yar, Yalutorovsky District, Tyumen Oblast, a village in Singulsky Rural Okrug of Yalutorovsky District of Tyumen Oblast
- Yar, Dizminsky Selsoviet, Yarsky District, Udmurt Republic, a village in Dizminsky Selsoviet of Yarsky District of the Udmurt Republic
- Yar, Yarsky Selsoviet, Yarsky District, Udmurt Republic, a settlement in Yarsky Selsoviet of Yarsky District of the Udmurt Republic
- Yar, Vladimir Oblast, a settlement in Vyaznikovsky District of Vladimir Oblast
