= Koi Jeeta Koi Haara =

- Poster
- Directed by: Samir Ganguly
- Produced by: Anand Bhargava
- Music by: Laxmikant-Pyarelal
- Distributed by: Laxmi Movies
- Release date: 1976
- Country: India
- Language: Hindi

Koi Jeeta Koi Haara (lit. 'One wins, one loses') is a 1976 Bollywood drama film directed by Samir Ganguly and produced by Anand Bhargava.

== Plot ==
Ajit, a notorious gang leader, unexpectedly falls in love with a young woman named Sonali. When an enemy attempts to kill him, Sonali believes that Ajit has died and eventually marries another man. Ajit survives and later returns, seeking revenge against those who tried to kill him.

== Cast ==
- Saira Banu
- Farida Jalal
- Seema Kapoor
- Shashi Kapoor
- Narendra Nath
- Ranjeet
- Romesh Sharma
- Siraj Syed
- Sharad Kumar

== Songs ==
Lyricist: Anand Bakshi

1. "Humne Har Ek Galat Kaam Kiya Hai" – Kishore Kumar
2. "Aaj Hum Tum Dono Chup Rahenge" – Kishore Kumar, Asha Bhosle
3. "Ban Gayi Baat Baaton Mein" – Kishore Kumar, Asha Bhosle
4. "Koi Jeeta Koi Haara" – Mohammed Rafi
5. "O Baba Shaadi Tum Na Karna" – Lata Mangeshkar
