= Bhemaa =

- Directed by: Dinesh Saxena
- Produced by: Netrapal Singh
- Starring: Shatrughan Sinha; Jaya Prada
- Music by: R. D. Burman
- Release date: 1984
- Country: India
- Language: Hindi

Bhemaa is a 1984 Bollywood action drama film directed by Dinesh Saxena, starring Shatrughan Sinha and Jaya Prada.

== Plot ==
Inspector Bheem Singh is a noble police officer who gets frustrated by his greedy wife Seema, he changes totally and becomes a bandit named Bheema.

== Cast ==
- Shatrughan Sinha
- Jaya Prada
- Ranjeet
- Bharat Bhushan
- Heena Kausar

== Soundtrack ==
Lyrics: Anjaan

Song	Singer
"Deewane Kya Hai"	Asha Bhosle
"Gori Gori Titli Main"	Asha Bhosle
"Jhoom Bindiya, Jhoom Kajra"	Asha Bhosle
"Maanungi Na Teri Manmaani"	Asha Bhosle
