= Yaar? =

Yaar? or Yaar may refer to:

- Yaar? (film), a 1985 Indian Tamil-language film
- Yaar? (TV series), a 2017 Singaporean Tamil-language TV series
- Yaar (book), a 2018 Nepali autobiography by Nayan Raj Pandey
- Yaara, 2020 Indian crime action film by Tigmanshu Dhulia

== See also ==
- Yar (disambiguation)
- Yaarana (disambiguation)
