= Rishta Kagaz Ka =

- Promotional Poster
- Directed by: Ajay Goel
- Produced by: Ajay Goel
- Starring: Raj Babbar; Rati Agnihotri
- Cinematography: Keki Mistry
- Music by: Rajesh Roshan
- Production company: Goel Cine Corporation
- Release date: 1 January 1983 (India)
- Running time: 2 hours 30 min
- Country: India
- Language: Hindi

Rishta Kagaz Ka is a 1983 Indian Hindi-language romance film produced and directed by Ajay Goel. It stars Raj Babbar and Rati Agnihotri in lead roles.

== Plot ==
Suman sacrifices a lot and cares for her adoptive brother Arun when his parents and brother Bunty pass away. Arun grows up to be an engineer but his marriage makes his relationship with Suman suffer.

== Cast ==
- Raj Babbar as Arun Sharma
- Rati Agnihotri as Aarti A. Sharma
- Nutan as Suman Sharma
- Suresh Oberoi as Dr. Ravi Kaul
- Iftekhar as Bhatnagar
- Urmila Bhatt as Mrs. Kaul
- Jagdish Raj as Aarti's dad
- Neeta Mehta as Roopa

== Soundtrack ==
Track#	Title	Singer(s)
1	"Kya Ho Gaya Mujhe, Puchho Na Jaane Jaa"	Kishore Kumar, Asha Bhosle
2	"Allah Teri Shaan"	Kishore Kumar, Lata Mangeshkar
3	"Sajna Sun Sun Meri Chaabi"	Lata Mangeshkar
4	"Chhotaa Saa Bhaiyaa Hamaaraa, Bahanaa Ke Dil Kaa Dulaaraa"	Lata Mangeshkar
