= Chakkarayumma =

- Poster
- Directed by: Sajan
- Written by: S. N. Swami
- Screenplay by: Kaloor Dennis
- Produced by: Jagan Appachan
- Starring: Madhu; Srividya; Mammootty; Jagathy Sreekumar
- Cinematography: Anandakuttan
- Edited by: V. P. Krishnan
- Music by: Shyam
- Production company: Jagan Pictures
- Distributed by: Jagan Pictures
- Release date: 12 April 1984
- Country: India
- Language: Malayalam

Chakkarayumma is a 1984 Indian Malayalam-language film, directed by Sajan and produced by Jagan Appachan. The film stars Madhu, Srividya, Mammootty and Jagathy Sreekumar in the lead roles. The film has musical score by Shyam. The film was remade in Tamil as Bandham with Sivaji Ganesan and in Telugu as Bandham starring Shoban Babu. Both versions had Shalini reprising her role.

== Cast ==
- Madhu as Mathews
- Mammootty as Babu
- Kajal Kiran as Vineetha Mathews, Mathews daughter and Babu's wife
- Baby Shalini as Babu and Vineetha's daughter
- Lalu Alex as Babunni
- Jagathy Sreekumar as Rehman
- Srividya as Beegam
- M. G. Soman as Sayed Muhammed
- Sabitha Anand as Asha Thomas
- Cochin Haneefa
- Raveendran

== Soundtrack ==
The music was composed by Shyam and the lyrics were written by Poovachal Khader.

| No. | Song | Singers | Lyrics | Length (m:ss) |
|---|---|---|---|---|
| 1 | "Kodathi Venam" | K. J. Yesudas | Poovachal Khader | |
| 2 | "Naalukaashum Kayyil Vechu" | Jagathy Sreekumar, Krishnachandran, Baby Shalini | Poovachal Khader | |
| 3 | "Thalarunnu Oridam Tharoo" | S. Janaki | Poovachal Khader | |
| 4 | "Vaasaram Thudangi" | K. J. Yesudas, P. Susheela | Poovachal Khader | |
