= K. Asif =

Indian director (1922–1971)

- Born: Asif Karim; 14 June 1922; Etawah, United Provinces, British India
- Died: 9 March 1971 (aged 48); Bombay, Maharashtra, India
- Occupations: Film director; film producer; screenwriter
- Years active: 1945 - 1971
- Spouses: Sitara Devi; Nigar Sultana; Akhtar Asif
- Children: 6
- Relatives: Dilip Kumar (brother-in-law); Nasir Khan (brother-in-law)

K. Asif (born Asif Karim; 14 June 1922 – 9 March 1971) was an Indian film director, film producer and screenwriter who is known for his epic film, Mughal-e-Azam (1960).

== Early life ==
Asif was born in Etawah, Uttar Pradesh, India to parents Dr. Fazal Karim and Bibi Ghulam Fatima. Asif went to Bombay and later took the professional name K. Asif. He eventually became a successful film director and producer.

== Career ==
His directorial debut, Phool (1945), did very well at the box-office. In 1944, Asif planned to make a film called Mughal-e-Azam based on the life and times of Mughal Emperor Akbar the Great's court dancer, based on the Urdu novel Anarkali' written by Syed Imtiaz Ali Taj, with Chandramohan as the male lead and the then upcoming actress Nargis as the female lead. However, in 1946, before the production of the film could begin, Chandramohan, died. Asif temporarily shelved the film. He produced the film Hulchul and released it in 1951.

At that time, Asif recast Mughal-e-Azam with Dilip Kumar in the male lead and Madhubala in the female lead and restarted the production of the film in the same year. In 1960, after twelve years in production, Mughal-e-Azam was released and became a huge hit at packed cinema houses across India.

After the release and success of Mughal-e-Azam, Asif planned yet another motion picture called Love and God, his first directorial venture to be made completely in color, and began production. The film was to star Guru Dutt and Nimmi. However, in 1964, when Dutt died, shooting came to a halt. Asif recast Sanjeev Kumar in the male lead and resumed production. While filming, K. Asif died on 9 March 1971 at the age of 48/49 and the film was abandoned. In 1986, Asif's senior widow, Akhtar Asif, (younger sister of Dilip Kumar) released the film in an incomplete form.

== Personal life ==
K. Asif married four times. His first wife was approved of and welcomed by his family. She remained married to him until her death, despite his other marriages, and was the mother of six of Asif's children.

Asif's second wife was the dancer and actress Sitara Devi. The marriage between them happened in unusual circumstances. Asif had a sister, Sikandar Begum, who was married to her first cousin, the actor Nazir Ahmed Khan (not to be confused with the actor Nasir Khan, brother of Dilip Kumar). Nazir Ahmed Khan fell in love with Sitara Devi and married her while still being married to Sikandar Begum; as a Muslim man in India, he could have up to four wives concurrently. Asif became enamoured of Sitara Devi, who was his sister's co-wife and his cousin's second wife. Nazir and Sitara were soon divorced, and shortly afterwards, Asif married Sitara, who thus became the wife, successively, of Sikandar Begum's husband and brother.

However, the marriage of Asif and Sitara lasted no more than a few months, and they were soon divorced. This happened because by then Asif had fallen in love with the actress Nigar Sultana, who played the important role of Bahaar in Asif's magnum opus, Mughal-e-Azam. Asif divorced Sitara Devi, apparently at her insistence, and married Sultana. Born in Hyderabad in south India, Sultana had previously been married to the actor/director S. M. Yusuf. That marriage had been childless and had ended in divorce when Yusuf moved to Pakistan some years after the partition of India in 1947. Asif and Sultana became the parents of a daughter, the minor actress Heena Kausar, who appeared in bit roles in a number of films. She became the second wife of the underworld gangster Iqbal Mirchi, a close associate of India's most wanted criminal, Dawood Ibrahim. Among other crimes, Iqbal Mirchi is said to have been a drug-dealer and to have laundered Dawood Ibrahim's ill-gotten wealth through his business ventures.

Asif's fourth and last wife was Akhtar, the younger sister of actor Dilip Kumar. Asif and Akhtar became acquainted with each other since Asif used to visit Kumar's house frequently during the making of Mughal-e-Azam. It is said that Kumar was extremely unhappy about his sister marrying Asif, and the consequent rift between Kumar and Asif never healed. Akhtar Begum and Asif remained married until his death in 1971. It was Akhtar Begum who ensured the completion and release of Asif's last movie, Love and God, which was released in 1986, fifteen years after Asif's death.

== Filmography ==
Year	Title	Director	Writer	Producer	Notes
1945	Phool	Yes	Kamal Amrohi		
1951	Hulchul			Yes	
1960	Mughal-e-Azam	Yes	Yes	Yes	
1986	Sastaa Khoon, Mehanga Paani	Yes			Incomplete
1986	Love And God	Yes			Posthumous Incomplete release

== Awards ==
- 1960: Filmfare Award for Best Film – Mughal-e-Azam
- 1960: Filmfare Award for Best Director – Mughal-e-Azam: Nominated
- 1960: President's Silver Medal for Best Feature Film in Hindi – Mughal-e-Azam

== Bibliography ==
- K. Asif; Nasreen Munni Kabir; Suhail Akhtar (2007). The immortal dialogue of K. Asif's Mughal-e-azam. Oxford University Press. ISBN 978-0-19-568496-4.
