= Bandham (film) =

1985 film

- Theatrical release poster
- Directed by: K. Vijayan
- Written by: Aaroor Dass (dialogues)
- Story by: S. Narayanasamy
- Produced by: Anandavalli Balaji
- Starring: Sivaji Ganesan; Kajal Kiran; Shalini; Anand Babu
- Cinematography: Tiwari
- Edited by: D. Vasu
- Music by: Shankar–Ganesh
- Production company: Sujatha Cine Arts
- Release date: 26 January 1985
- Country: India
- Language: Tamil

Bandham (transl. The Bond) is a 1985 Indian Tamil-language drama film, directed by K. Vijayan and produced by Anandavalli Balaji. The film stars Sivaji Ganesan, Kajal Kiran, Shalini and Anand Babu. It is a remake of the Malayalam film Chakkarayumma. The film was released on 26 January 1985. Shalini reprised her role in the Telugu remake with the same name.

== Plot ==
Abraham is a rich and arrogant businessman. His only daughter, Mary is in love with poor Raja. Abraham disowns his daughter while Raheem helps them get married and supports them. They have a daughter Asha but Raja dies untimely. Raheem manipulates the situation in such a manner that Abraham meets Asha and they slowly start bonding. What happens when Abraham finds out that Asha is his grand-daughter forms the rest of the story.

== Cast ==
- Sivaji Ganesan as Abraham, retired general and Mary's father.
- Kajal Kiran as Mary, Abraham's daughter.
- Shalini as Asha, Mary's daughter.
- Anand Babu as Raja, Mary's love interest.
- Nizhalgal Ravi as Thomas, Raja's friend.
- Jaishankar as Raheem, principal of Raja's college and Abraham's friend.
- Manorama as Naveetha
- Charle as Abdul, Raja's collagemate.
- Babloo Prithiveeraj as dancer in song "Hey Aatha"

== Soundtrack ==
The music was composed by Shankar–Ganesh.

| Song | Singers | Lyrics |
|---|---|---|
| "Mullaikodi Allikadi" | S. P. Balasubrahmanyam, S. Janaki | Vaali |
| "Baby Baby O My Baby" | T. M. Soundararajan, S. Janaki | Pulamaipithan |
| "Bandham Bandham Pasa Bandham" | K. J. Yesudas | Vaali |
| "Hey Hey" | S. P. Balasubrahmanyam and chorus | Vaali |

== Reception ==
Kalki appreciated the performances of Ganesan and Shalini, as well as their chemistry.
