= Aakhri Insaaf =

1980 Indian Hindi film

- Directed by: Kalidas
- Starring: Ashok Kumar; Mithun Chakraborty; Zarina Wahab; Rameshwari; Vijayendra Ghatge; Pradeep Kumar
- Music by: Rajesh Roshan
- Release date: 9 February 1980
- Running time: 125 minutes
- Country: India
- Language: Hindi

Aakhri Insaaf is a 1980 Indian Hindi-language film directed by Kalidas, starring Ashok Kumar, Mithun Chakraborty, Rameshwari, Zarina Wahab, Vijayendra Ghatge, Pradeep Kumar.

== Cast ==
- Ashok Kumar as Peter Ferandez
- Mithun Chakraborty as Shankar
- Zarina Wahab as Malini
- Rameshwari as Nirmala
- Vijayendra Ghatge as Rajesh
- Pradeep Kumar as Shamsher

== Soundtrack ==
Song	Singer
"Aaiye Aapse Hum"	Lata Mangeshkar
"Yaaron, Who Has Seen"	Amit Kumar
"Meri Aankhen Tere Sapne Din Raat Dekhen"	Amit Kumar, Anuradha Paudwal
"Dil Ka Laya Hoon Nazrana"	Amit Kumar, Varsha Bhosle
