= Life Express (2010 film) =

- Film poster
- Directed by: Anup Das
- Screenplay by: Mandira Chakraborty; Shailendra Tyagi
- Story by: Anup Das
- Produced by: Sanjay Kalate
- Starring: Rituparna Sengupta; Kiran Janjani; Yashpal Sharma; Alok Nath; Nandita Puri; Anjan Srivastav; Daya Shankar Pandey; Vijayendra Ghatge
- Cinematography: Anil Chandel
- Edited by: Sanjib Datta
- Music by: Roop Kumar Rathod
- Production company: Sky Motion Pictures
- Release date: 17 September 2010
- Country: India
- Language: Hindi

Life Express is a 2010 Indian drama film about a career-minded woman who decides to become a mother through surrogacy after having an abortion.

== Plot ==
Mumbai-based Tanvi Sharma, married to financier, Nikhil, for 3 years, is thrilled when she is not only promoted as Assistant Vice-President with her employer, ICBI Bank, but also tests positive for motherhood. Her joy surrounding her pregnancy is short-lived when she realizes that motherhood will not only negatively impact her marriage but her promotion as well. After her abortion, she and Nikhil decide to have a child through a surrogate, who will live with them during the pregnancy period. A broker, Shukla, arranges a surrogate, Gauri, an impoverished village-based mother of two children, and the wife of an unemployed idol-artist, Mohan. While dealing with pressures of the stigma attached of nursing a child sired through another woman from family and friends, she must also deal with the fact that a naive Gauri may decide to keep the child.

== Cast ==
- Rituparna Sengupta as Tanvi N. Sharma
- Kiran Janjani as Nikhil Sharma
- Yashpal Sharma as Mohan
- Alok Nath as Mr. Singh - Tanvi's dad
- Nandita Puri as Mrs. Shanti Singh - Tanvi's mom
- Anjan Srivastav as Paresh
- Daya Shankar Pandey as Shukla
- Vijayendra Ghatge as Tanvi's boss
- Divya Dutta as Gauri
- Sapan Saran as Soni
- Bharat Kaul as Dr. Patel
- Vijayendra Ghatge as Tanvi's boss

== Soundtrack ==
Life Express

Soundtrack album by Roop Kumar Rathod
- Released: 2010
- Genre: World Music
- Producer: Roop Kumar Rathod

Roop Kumar Rathod was the music director. Shakeel Azmi wrote the lyrics. The album has 8 tracks.

Song title	Singers
Phiki Phiki Si Lage Zindagi Tere Pyaar Ka Namak Jo Na Ho	Udit Narayan, Shreya Ghoshal
Thodisi Kami Rahey Jaati Hai	
Phool Khilade Sakhon Par	Jagjit Singh
