= Maine Jeena Seekh Liya =

- Directed by: Bhisham Kohli
- Written by: Surendra Sathi
- Starring: Shakti Kapoor; Mohan Bhakri; Dulari
- Music by: Nadeem-Shravan
- Release date: 1982

Maine Jeena Seekh Liya is a 1982 Bollywood romantic drama film directed by Bhisham Kohli.

== Cast ==
- Mohan Bhakri
- Dulari
- Abhi Bhattacharya
- Kajal Kiran
- Shakti Kapoor
- Zarina Wahab
- Birbal
- Rajni Bala
- Geeta Behl

== Soundtrack ==
1. "Chehra Kanwal Hai Aap Ka" - Suresh Wadkar
2. "Kal Sham Ko Milenge" - Alka Yagnik, Shailendra Singh
3. "Pal Do Pal Ki Zindagi Mein" - Amit Kumar
4. "Sasurji Mile Hain Pyar Se" - Shailendra Singh, Alka Yagnik
5. "Zara Zara Tu Pyar Kar" - Salma Agha
