= Uyarangalil =

- Directed by: I. V. Sasi
- Written by: M. T. Vasudevan Nair
- Produced by: S. Pavamani
- Starring: Mohanlal; Nedumudi Venu; Rahman; Ratheesh; Kajal Kiran; Swapna
- Cinematography: Jayanan Vincent
- Edited by: K. Narayanan
- Music by: Shyam
- Production company: Prathap Chithra
- Distributed by: Sheeba Films; Aishwarya Release
- Release date: 30 November 1984
- Country: India
- Language: Malayalam

Uyarangalil (transl. On heights) is a 1984 Indian Malayalam-language thriller film directed by I. V. Sasi and written by M. T. Vasudevan Nair. It stars Mohanlal, Nedumudi Venu, Rahman, Ratheesh, Kajal Kiran and Swapna. The music for the film was provided by Shyam. The film was a commercial success at the box office. It is regarded as one of the best thrillers in Malayalam cinema and developed a cult following. Mohanlal plays an anti-hero role; critics cite the film as having one of the best performances of Mohanlal. The plot of this movie is inspired by an Italian movie, English titled Almost Human (1974 film) directed by Umberto Lenzi.

== Plot ==
Jayarajan, an over-enthusiastic assistant manager at a tea plantation, plans to loot a huge amount from the company. He lures two debt-ridden subordinates, Chandran and Johnny, into his conspiracy. Though unwilling, both agree. But during their attempt, A. K. Menon, the manager of the company, catches them red-handed. To keep matters under wraps, Jayarajan enters Menon's house at night, asking Johnny and Chandran to wait outside, saying that he would negotiate with Menon. Jayarajan kills Menon and escapes from the house. He acts normal the next day and provides help to the police. But both Johnny and Chandran feel guilty to the soul. Jayarajan says he will keep silent and act as if nothing happened.

Soon, however, Jayarajan is elevated as the new Manager of the company. Devi, the fed-up young widow of Menon, due to Menon's negligent behaviour towards her, arrives at the plantation for terminal financial formalities. Jayarajan, who already was having an affair with the money-motivated Padma, a nurse of the Plantation Hospital, now eyes Devi. He succeeds in seducing her and having sex with her, after which he plans to siphon off all the financial benefits that she might get as Menon's bereavement benefits. But a cop, Ravi, becomes suspicious of Jayarajan, although he has nothing to nail Jayarajan on, due to the flawless and naturally responsive demeanour of Jayarajan.

Cop Ravi starts investigating Jayarajan's past and finds some loose ends, but he gets no solid proof in this regard. But Ravi keeps a watch on Jayarajan. However, Jayarajan neither stops his illicit relationship with Padma the nurse nor deserts Devi. In a strange turn of events, fearing faint-hearted Johnny might spill the beans of the Manager's murder, Jayarajan finishes off Johnny in an orchestrated jeep accident and Padma, by strangulation, mimicking a suicide without any trace of suspicion about the two murders to anybody except Chandran, whose silence Jayarajan buys with scare tactics.

Meanwhile, the elderly owner of the estate visits the plantation. Knowing that his young daughter Vasanthi would inherit the company, Jayarajan tries to woo her too. But Devi becomes a hindrance in his plans, and her insistence on a marriage pushes him to plot a plan to finish off Devi too. But before he can kill Devi, Chandran informs Vasanthi the truth about the death of Menon and both succeed in calling the cops. But before getting arrested by Ravi, Jayarajan jumps down from the heights and commits suicide.

== Cast ==
- Mohanlal as P. K. Jayarajan
- Rahman as Chandran
- Nedumudi Venu as Johnny
- Ratheesh as Sub Inspector Ravi
- Kajal Kiran as Devi Menon
- Swapna as Padhma
- Viji as Vasanthi
- Thilakan as Circle Inspector Hari Kurup
- Jagathy Sreekumar as Balan Pillai (Office Manager)
- K. P. Ummer as Santhosh Varma, Owner of Plantation
- Bahadoor as Constable Sankaran Nair
- Janardhanan as A. K. Menon
- Adoor Bhavani as Betsy, Joshiy's mother
- Balan K. Nair as Superintendent of Police Sukumaran (Cameo)
- Kunchan as Compounter Karunan
- Azeez as Dinesh, A. K. Menon's brother.
- P. K. Abraham
- T. P. Madhavan as Dr. Peter Varghese
- Prathapachandran as Fr. Stephen Chacko
- Meghanathan as Gopi, Chandran's brother
- Sathyakala
- Roshni as Nancy, Joseph's Sister
- Sulekha

== Soundtrack ==
The music was composed by Shyam and the lyrics were written by Bichu Thirumala.

No.	Song	Singers	Lyrics	Length
1	"Anchithalil Viriyum"	K. J. Yesudas, K. S. Chithra, Chorus	Bichu Thirumala	
2	"Vaanampaadi Ithile"	K. S. Chithra	Bichu Thirumala	

== Release ==
Released on 30 November 1984, the film was a commercial success at the box office. The film is also noted for having one of Mohanlal's finest performances in his early career. It is regarded as one of the best thrillers in Malayalam cinema and has a cult following.
