= Tere Pyar Mein (1979 film) =

- Promotional poster
- Directed by: Subhash Sharma
- Produced by: G L Gupta; Subhash Sharma
- Starring: Mithun Chakraborty; Sarika; Vijayendra Ghatge; Shyamlee; Nadira; Madan Puri; Iftekhar
- Music by: Bappi Lahiri
- Release date: 2 March 1979
- Running time: 135 minutes
- Country: India
- Language: Hindi

Tere Pyar Mein is a 1979 Indian Hindi-language film directed by Subhash Sharma, starring Mithun Chakraborty, Sarika, Vijayendra Ghatge, Paintal, Nadira, Madan Puri and Iftekhar.

== Cast ==
- Mithun Chakraborty as Shekhar
- Sarika as Seema
- Vijayendra Ghatge as Akash
- Shyamlee as Anju
- Nadira
- Madan Puri
- Iftekhar

== Soundtrack ==
#	Title	Singer(s)
1	"Aankhon Mein Tum" (Happy)	Bappi Lahiri, Sulakshana Pandit
2	"Bhool Gaye Hum Sab Kuch"	Bhupinder Singh, Bansari Lahiri
3	"Ha Aa Meri Jaan"	Shailender Singh, Preeti Sagar
4	"Aankhon Mein Tum (Slow)"	Bappi Lahiri
5	"Ankhon Mein Hai Aansoo"	Chandrani Mukherjee
6	"Ooee Yamma Ooee Yamma"	Mahendra Kapoor, Mahesh Kumar
