= Kirayi Rowdylu =

- Theatrical poster
- Directed by: A. Kodandarami Reddy
- Written by: Paruchuri brothers
- Story by: Sathyanand
- Produced by: Kranthi Kumar
- Starring: Chiranjeevi; Mohan Babu; Radhika
- Music by: Chakravarthy
- Production company: Kranthi Chitra
- Release date: 24 December 1981
- Country: India
- Language: Telugu

Kirayi Rowdylu is a 1981 Telugu-language film directed by A. Kodandarami Reddy. It features Chiranjeevi, Mohan Babu, and Radhika. The film was a box office success, and it was remade in Hindi as Hoshiyar. This film ran for more than 100 days in many centres across Andhra Pradesh.

== Cast ==
- Chiranjeevi as Raja
- Mohan Babu as Koti
- Radhika
- Rao Gopal Rao
- Allu Ramalingaiah
- Prabhakar Reddy
