= Pyaara Dushman =

- Poster
- Directed by: Anand Sagar
- Produced by: Subhash Sagar
- Starring: Amjad Khan; Rakesh Roshan; Vinod Mehra
- Music by: Bappi Lahiri
- Release date: 24 October 1980
- Country: India
- Language: Hindi

Pyaara Dushman (lit. 'Lovely enemy') is a 1980 Bollywood Hindi movie. Produced by Subhash Sagar it is directed by Anand Sagar. The film stars Amjad Khan, Rakesh Roshan, Vinod Mehra, Vidya Sinha, Yogeeta Bali and Sarika. The film's music is by Bappi Lahiri who composed the songs "Ek Dhoondho Milte Hain Hazaaron" and "Hari Om Hari".

The soundtrack includes the song "Hari Om Hari", which is picturized on Kalpana Iyer, and is inspired by Eruption's version of "One Way Ticket".

== Cast ==
- Amjad Khan as Shiva
- Rakesh Roshan as Raja
- Vinod Mehra as Inspector Amar
- Vidya Sinha as Rani
- Yogeeta Bali as Geeta
- Sarika as Reema
- Suresh Oberoi as Vicky
- Kalpana Iyer as Dancer
- Baby Khushbu
- Master Sonu

== Soundtrack ==
Song	Singer
"Ek Dhundho, Milte Hain Hazaron, Husnwale Kam Nahin"	Kishore Kumar, Asha Bhosle
"Goriya Hamen Jeena Teri Gali Mein"	Kishore Kumar, Asha Bhosle
"Tu Hai Meri Deewani, Main Hoon Tera Deewana"	Kishore Kumar, Asha Bhosle
"Tum Baahar Kahan Chale"	Asha Bhosle
"Hari Om Hari"	Usha Uthup
"Ab Jo Bichhde"	Rafiq Sagar
