= Armaan (1981 film) =

1981 film by Anand Sagar

- Theatrical release poster
- Directed by: Anand Sagar
- Produced by: Anand Sagar
- Starring: Raj Babbar; Shakti Kapoor; Shammi Kapoor; Ranjeeta Kaur; Dev Kumar; Deepak Parashar; Kalpana Iyer; Prema Narayan
- Music by: Bappi Lahiri
- Distributed by: Sagar Art Films Pvt. Ltd.
- Release date: 6 November 1981
- Running time: 131 minutes
- Country: India
- Language: Hindi

Armaan is a Hindi film directed by Anand Sagar, starring Raj Babbar, Shakti Kapoor, Shammi Kapoor, Ranjeeta Kaur, Dev Kumar, Deepak Parashar and as a guest star Kalpana Iyer and Prema Narayan in song "Mere Jaesi Haseena". It is loosely based on the 1942 American film Casablanca.

== Plot ==
This film tells the story of the Indian freedom struggle against the Portuguese occupation in Goa.

Deepak Parashar plays a freedom fighter, Raj Babbar a bar owner, Ranjeeta Kaur the shared love interest, Shammi Kapoor the bar piano player and Shakti Kapoor the freeloading Portuguese Captain Gomes. Starts off in Dharampur then migrates to Goa which is then under Portuguese occupation. The banter between Shammi Kapoor and Shakti Kapoor, referring to Captain Gomes as HK - Holy King to his face, Haram Khor (freeloader) behind his back, lends a comedic touch.

== Cast ==
- Shammi Kapoor
- Ranjeeta Kaur
- Raj Babbar
- Deepak Parashar
- Shakti Kapoor
- Dev Kumar
- Kalpana Iyer
- Prema Narayan

== Soundtrack ==
Armaan

Soundtrack album by Bappi Lahiri
- Released: 31 December 1981
- Genre: Bollywood film soundtrack; Chutney; Disco
- Label: Saregama
- Producer: Anand Sagar

All the songs in this film were composed by Bappi Lahiri, and the lyrics were written by Indeewar, Anjaan, and Kulwant Jani. The Bollywood disco song "Ramba Ho Ho Ho Samba Ho Ho Ho" was listed at #21 on Binaca Geetmala annual list 1981. Another popular song was "Mere Jaesi Haseena", a song in the Indian-Trinidadian hybrid style known as Chutney.

Song	Singer
"Jeevan Mitana Hai Deewanapan"	Kishore Kumar
"Pyar Hi Jeene Ki Surat Hai"	Kishore Kumar
"Zindagi Ke Raaste Mein"	Lata Mangeshkar
"Tich Batna Di Jodi"	Mahendra Kapoor, Minoo Purushottam
"Mere Jaisi Haseena Ka Dil Jahan Jis Se Mil Jaye"	Sharon Prabhakar, Bappi Lahiri
"Rambha Ho Ho Ho"	Usha Uthup

== Accolades ==
- Nomination Filmfare Award for Best Music Director - Bappi Lahiri
- Nomination Filmfare Award for Best Female Playback Singer - Usha Uthup for the song "Ramba Ho Ho Ho Samba Ho Ho Ho"
- Nomination Filmfare Award for Best Female Playback Singer - Sharon Prabhakar for the song "Mere Jaesi Haseena"
