= Qurbani Rang Layegi =

- Release poster
- Directed by: Raj N. Sippy
- Written by: Kader Khan (dialogue); Prayag Raj (story)
- Produced by: K. K. Talwar
- Starring: Sanjay Dutt; Poonam Dhillon; Padmini Kolhapure; Kajal Kiran; Shakti Kapoor
- Cinematography: Anwar Siraj
- Edited by: Waman B. Bhosle; Gurudutt Shirali
- Music by: Laxmikant–Pyarelal
- Release date: 17 May 1991
- Country: India
- Language: Hindi

Qurbani Rang Layegi is a 1991 Indian Hindi-language drama film directed by Raj N. Sippy and produced by K. K. Talwar. It stars Sanjay Dutt, Poonam Dhillon, Padmini Kolhapure in pivotal roles, along with Kajal Kiran and Shakti Kapoor. The film was started making in 1984, due to dalays for many reasons, it was finally released in 1991.

== Cast ==
- Sanjay Dutt as Raj
- Poonam Dhillon as Poonam
- Padmini Kolhapure as Basanti
- Kajal Kiran as Chhutki
- Shakti Kapoor as Vicky
- Sujit Kumar as Jaikishan

== Soundtrack ==
Lyrics: Gulshan Bawra

Song	Singer
"Mere Geeton Ko"	Shabbir Kumar
"Pyar Kismat Se Milta Hai"	Shabbir Kumar
"Shukriya Shukriya Shukriya"	Shabbir Kumar
"Tirchhi Nazar Ka Mara Teer Topiwale Ne"	Shabbir Kumar, Asha Bhosle
"Abhi Abhi Taaza Taaza Mili Hai Khabar"	Shabbir Kumar, Asha Bhosle
