= Hoshiyar =

- Poster
- Directed by: K. Raghavendra Rao
- Written by: Kader Khan(dialogues); Indeevar (lyrics)
- Screenplay by: Paruchuri Brothers
- Story by: Satyanand
- Based on: Kirayi Rowdylu (1981)
- Produced by: G. Hanumantha Rao; Krishna (Presents)
- Starring: Jeetendra; Shatrughan Sinha; Jaya Prada; Meenakshi Sheshadri
- Cinematography: K. S. Prakash
- Edited by: Kotagiri Venkateswara Rao
- Music by: Bappi Lahiri
- Production company: Padmalaya Studios
- Release date: 18 January 1985
- Running time: 148 minutes
- Country: India
- Language: Hindi

Hoshiyar (transl. Careful) is a 1985 Hindi-language action film, produced by G. Hanumantha Rao under the Padmalaya Studios banner, presented by Krishna and directed by K. Raghavendra Rao. It stars Jeetendra, Shatrughan Sinha, Jaya Prada, Meenakshi Sheshadri and music composed by Bappi Lahiri. The film is a remake of the Telugu movie Kirayi Rowdylu (1981). The film did not do well at the box office.

== Plot ==
Jagannath, Dhartiraj, and Malpani are close friends. When Jagannath wins a jackpot, the other two kill him and usurp his fortune. Jagannath's wife Sitadevi quits town along with her sons, Rakesh and Rajesh. Their train has an accident and Rajesh is separated from his family. Rajesh is brought up by an elderly man who entrusts his blind granddaughter Shanti’s responsibility to him.

Rakesh grows up to become a pop singer and unknowingly falls in love with Dhartiraj's daughter Jyoti. Rajesh is a ruffian who helps Dhartiraj and dotes on Shanti. Dhartiraj opposes the love affair of Rakesh and Jyoti and wants to marry her off to Malpani's son Shakti. Friction ensues between Dhartiraj and Rajesh when a goon molests Shanti and kills her. Rajesh abducts Jyoti in retaliation. Rakesh finds their whereabouts through Rajesh’s love interest Radha. Sitadevi learns that Rajesh is her own son. She and Radha proceed to stop the brothers from fighting. The film ends on a happy note.

== Cast ==
The cast is as follows:

- Jeetendra as Rakesh
- Shatrughan Sinha as Rajesh
- Jaya Prada as Radha
- Meenakshi Sheshadri as Jyoti
- Tanuja as Seeta
- Pran as Dhartiraj
- Kader Khan as Malpani
- Shakti Kapoor as Malpani's Son
- Asrani as Jumbo
- Ranjeet as Shambhu Das

== Production ==
The film is the only collaboration between Jeetendra and Meenakshi as hero-heroine.

== Soundtrack ==
The music of the film was composed by Bappi Lahiri.

=== Track listing ===
Song	Singer
"Atka Atka"	Kishore Kumar, Asha Bhosle
"Choli Tere"	Kishore Kumar, Asha Bhosle
"Teri Jaisi Koi"	Kishore Kumar, Asha Bhosle
"Bhaiya Ke Haath Mein" (Happy)	S. P. Balasubrahmanyam, Asha Bhosle
"Bhaiya Ke Haath Mein" (Sad)	S. P. Balasubrahmanyam, Asha Bhosle
"Dil Sangeet Ka"	Asha Bhosle, Bappi Lahiri
"Ho Ja Hoshiyar"	Asha Bhosle

== Reception ==
The film was listed by India Today as one of the year's expensive Hindi action films which did not leave a mark commercially. Rediff.com lists the film as an example to films employing the exaggerated "dishoom dishoom" sound effect in action scenes.
