= Yar, Vladimir Oblast =

Yar Яр
- Settlement
- Location within Vladimir Oblast Location within Russia
- Coordinates: 56°13′N 42°17′E
- Country: Russia
- Region: Vladimir Oblast
- District: Vyaznikovsky District
- Time zone: UTC+3:00

Yar (Russian: Яр) is a rural locality (a settlement) in Gorod Vyazniki, Vyaznikovsky District, Vladimir Oblast, Russia. The population was 2 as of 2010.

== Geography ==
Yar is located 13 km east of Vyazniki (the district's administrative centre) by road. Log is the nearest rural locality.
