= Iqbal Mirchi =

Indian criminal (1950–2013)

- Born: Mohammad Iqbal Memon; 25 April 1950; Mumbai, India
- Died: 14 August 2013 (aged 63); London, United Kingdom
- Organization: D-Company
- Spouses: Hajira Memon; Hina Kausar (m. 1991)
- Children: 3

Mohammad Iqbal Memon (25 April 1950 – 14 August 2013), known as Iqbal Mirchi, was an Indian underworld figure described as a close associate of India's most wanted criminal, Dawood Ibrahim, and a drug trafficker with alleged operations across Asia, Africa, and Europe. On June 1st, 2004, he was sanctioned under the Foreign Narcotics Kingpin Designation Act. Mirchi first gained attention in the early 1990s in connection with alleged drug trafficking activities and investigations related to the 1993 Bombay bombings.

Memon's family originally owned shops selling chilies and spices, which earned him the moniker 'Mirchi' (lit. 'chili'). Law enforcement agencies alleged that Memon's (Mirchi's) wealth increased significantly following his involvement in the illegal trade of banned meth tablets, heroin and Mandrax. He also owned a disco called The Fisherman's Wharf at Worli seafront in Mumbai, which the Mumbai Police alleged was used for the distribution of narcotics, being a front.

In May 1986, Mirchi was first detained by the Directorate of Revenue Intelligence in connection with the seizing of 600 kilograms of heroin — valued at around Rs 9 crore — from a farmhouse in Thane. However, prosecutors could not link Mirchi with the farmhouse and he was let off. Mirchi left India in late 1980s to avoid pending legal proceedings and potential arrest, first to Dubai and later to London. The front for all his businesses in the UK was a rice mill called Eden Fine Rice.

He was first arrested by Interpol in London in April 1995, following a red corner notice for his arrest issued by the CBI. An extradition request was made on the basis that Mirchi was wanted for ordering a murder, and was the prime suspect in two drug seizure cases.

In 1999, all investigations of Iqbal Mirchi were shut down for lack of evidence. The Government of India also lost its extradition proceedings against Mirchi. Mirchi died of a heart attack in London, at the age of 63 on August 14th, 2013. Shortly before his death, the Enforcement Directorate initiated a fresh investigation into his alleged links to Indian Premier League match-fixing and several drug offenses.

Mirchi claimed that he was a victim of persecution, and that all the allegations against him were unfounded and biased. In an interview with The Guardian in London, Memon denied the allegations, explaining that was how he won his extradition proceedings. Mirchi also denied being associated with Dawood Ibrahim in any way. In addition, Mirchi said he was a "law-abiding person with no convictions," and that he was "being victimised for being a successful businessman".

Though many allegations were produced in the media against Mirchi, he was never formally charged or convicted of any crime. In April 2016, Mirchi was named in the Panama papers for holding offshore assets and undisclosed funds in foreign bank accounts.

== Personal life ==
Iqbal Mirchi married twice. His first wife was Hajira Memon, by whom he has two sons, Asif and Junaid. All of them live in the United Kingdom. Mirchi's second wife was former actress Heena Kausar, daughter of film-maker K. Asif (producer-director of the epic Mughal-e-Azam) by his third wife, the actress Nigar Sultana. Mirchi and Heena married in 1991 and they had no children together. Heena too continues to reside in the United Kingdom.

In February 2021, a special court in Mumbai declared Mirchi’s wife, Hajira Memon, and his sons, Junaid and Asif, as Fugitive Economic Offenders under the Fugitive Economic Offenders Act, 2018, in connection with money laundering investigations.

== Nexus with authorities ==
Mirchi said he had close ties with officers of Mumbai Police Anti-narcotics cell. The files pertaining to cases registered against Mirchi went missing in 1995 when Government of India decided to participate in the extradition process in London Court.
