= Kalpana Iyer =

Indian actress, singer, and model (born 1956)

- Born: 26 July 1956 (age 70); Bombay, Bombay State, India
- Occupations: Actress, singer
- Years active: 1978–1999

Kalpana Iyer (born 26 July 1956) is a former Indian actress and singer, best known for her work in Hindi cinema in the 1980s and 1990s. She appeared in over 100 films and became renowned for her performances in popular dance numbers, as well as for her supporting and guest roles.

== Career ==
=== Pageantry ===
She was the first runner-up at Miss India in 1978. She went on to represent her country at the Miss World 1978 beauty pageant where she was a top 15 semi-finalist.

=== Acting ===
Kalpana mostly appeared as a vamp woman in a number of Hindi films, continuing in the tradition of Bindu, Helen and Aruna Irani. Some of her famous dance numbers are "Hari om Hari" in Pyaara Dushman (1980), "Tu Mujhe Jaan" in Wardat (1981) and "Rambha Ho" in Armaan (1981). Some of her renowned films are Satte Pe Satta (1982), Disco Dancer (1982), Anjaam (1994), Raja Hindustani (1996), and Hum Saath Saath Hain (1999). She was critically acclaimed for her performance as a prison warden in Anjaam which also featured Bollywood superstars Madhuri Dixit and Shah Rukh Khan. As of 2019, Iyer has appeared in a variety of films, as well as working on television.

=== Other ventures ===
Iyer also dabbled in singing, and performed in shows. She was the manager of a restaurant in Dubai called "The Moghul Room" which was owned by former Bollywood actor Rajan Sippy.

== Personal life ==
She was born in a Tamil Brahmin family Despite being considered as one of the bold actresses of her time, Iyer mentioned how she had a rather conservative mindset and was often misunderstood. Iyer told FirstPost in 2019:

"I was always misunderstood, you know, as the ‘it-girl’ personifying glamour and oomph. A Miss India, a model, an actress. Everyone assumed I was bold but I was actually very simple… God-fearing, always concerned about ruffling the feathers of my conservative Tam Bram family who were quiet and simple, and into Carnatic music… telling too many white lies to protect too many people."

— Kalpana Iyer

== Filmography ==
=== Film ===
Year	Film	Role
1980	Lootmaar	Dancer
1980	Pyaara Dushman	Dancer
1980	Manokaamnaa	Sonia(Lead role)
1981	Poonam	
1981	Hum Se Badkar Kaun	Shalu
1981	Wardat	Dancer
1981	Armaan	Dancer
1981	Kudrat	Dancer
1982	Satte Pe Satta	Ranjeet's Mistress
1982	Disco Dancer	Nikki Brown
1982	Waqt Ke Shehzade	
1982	Sawaal	Dancer
1983	Chor Police	Ruby
1984	Hum Hain Lajawab	Alif-Laila
1984	Nallavanukku Nallavan	Dancer
1985	Ameer Aadmi Gharib Aadmi	
1988	Zakhmi Aurat	Kanta
1989	Mil Gayee Manzil Mujhe	Kamini
1989	Abhi To Main Jawan Hoon	
1990	Tum Mere Ho	Nagin
1994	Laadla	Kamini
1994	Anjaam	Jail Warden
1995	Gundaraj	Public Prosecutor
1996	Raja Hindustani	In song "Pardesi Pardesi"
1999	Hum Saath Saath Hain	Shobha Gupta
1999	Kadhalar Dhinam (Tamil)	Raja's mother

=== Television ===
Year	Serial	Role	Channel
1992-1993	Kashish	Mrs. Anand (Rahul's mother)	DD National
1994	Junoon	Parvati	DD National
1994	Chandrakanta	Dum Dumi Maai	DD National
1994	Farmaan	Tasneem Pasha	DD National
1994	Banegi Apni Baat	Zee Tv	
1994	Margarita	Margarita	"Elena Mai"
