= Bhula Na Dena =

- Lobby card
- Directed by: Hersh Kohli
- Produced by: Kumar Butani
- Music by: Bappi Lahiri
- Release date: 1981
- Country: India
- Language: Hindi

Bhula Na Dena is a 1981 Hindi romance drama film directed by Harsh Kohli and produced by Kumar Butani, starring Rakesh Roshan, Helen and Jayshree T.

== Cast ==
- Rakesh Roshan
- Kajal Kiran
- Sujit Kumar
- Shekhar Kapur
- Helen
- Jayshree T.

== Music ==
All songs were written by Amit Khanna, while "D Le Gayi" was penned by Shaily Shailendra.

1. "Sikho To Sikhaye Tumhe Pyar Ka Sabak, Bhula Na Dena" - Shailendra Singh, Chandrani Mukherjee
2. "Batli Wali Ne" - Amit Kumar
3. "Dil Humne Jise" - Asha Bhosle
4. "Dil Le Gayi" - Bappi Lahiri
5. "Socha Na Samjha" - Asha Bhosle
