= Kajal Kiran =

Indian actress and model

- Born: Sunita Kulkarni; 18 October 1958 (age 67); Bombay, Bombay State, India
- Other name: Kaajal Kiran
- Education: St. Joseph’s High School, Mumbai, India
- Occupation: Actress
- Years active: 1977–1990
- Relatives: Ravi Kulkarni (brother)

Kajal Kiran (born 18 October 1958 as Sunita Kulkarni, also credited as Kaajal Kiran) is a former Indian actress and model, who is known for her work in Hindi films. Kiran made her debut starring in the film Hum Kisise Kum Naheen (1977) and appeared in almost 40 Hindi films and a handful of Kannada, Tamil and Malayalam films in a career spanning 13–14 years.

== Early life ==
Kiran was born and raised in Mumbai, to a middle class Marathi family. She did her schooling at St. Joseph's High School, where she mainly studied physics and biology, following her original dream to become a doctor.

== Career ==
Kiran made her film debut in 1977, when she was chosen by director Nasir Hussain to play the lead in his romantic comedy Hum Kisise Kum Naheen as Kajal Kisharina, the heroine of Rishi Kapoor (later in the film, as the heroine of Tariq). She also worked with actors Amjad Khan and Zeenat Aman. The film ended up to be a major box-office success, hitting the third highest-grossing movie of the year. It was marked as a classic film, and gained a cult following. The role shot Kiran to stardom, marking her official debut in the film industry, with her receiving much fame.

Following the success of the film, Kiran had then pursued her career and continued acting. She'd soon began to get more movie offers, and in 1980 starred as the lead role in Maang Bharo Sajana as Geeta Sinha, the heroine to Jeetendra, who played a double role, and starred alongside Rekha and Moushumi Chatterjee. The film turned to be a commercial success, turning to be the eighth highest-grossing film of its year. She also appeared in the Ramsay Brothers horror film Saboot in the same year, as Kaajal. In contrast to the success of her previous films, Saboot turned to underperform at the box-office, grossing merely ₹1.2 crore. She also made her first guest appearance as a dancer in the film Morchha, in the popular song "Ab Ki Baras." In 1981, Kiran then played the heroine to Mithun Chakraborty in the spy-thriller film Wardaat, and in the Bollywood-film Hum Se Badkar Kaun. The films were reported both as successful hits at the box-office, further boosting Kiran's credibility and career.

Kiran later starred in the Bollywood-action film Hum Se Hai Zamana in 1983 as Chutki, the heroine to Amjad Khan. She'd once again worked with Mithun Chakraborty and Zeenat Aman, and worked with the actress Kim and the actor Danny Denzongpa. In spite of the credible cast, the film was a box-office bomb, but became popular later for its songs. In the same year, she had also starred in the feature-film Karate as Geeta, working again alongside Mithun, and in the feature-film Lalach. Both films were box-office failures. The year before, she'd starred in Kannada-film Sahasa Simha, her first movie to be in a language other than Hindi.

Kiran continued to work in films, hitting mainly average grossers and failures. However, Kiran was able to bounce back. In 1984, she starred in the Malayalam film Uyarangalil as Devi Menon, starring alongside Mohanlal, Nedumudi Venu, and Rahman. The film was her second time she starred in a Malayalam film, with her starring in the film Chakkarayumma earlier that year. With Chakkarayumma being a commercial disappointment along with a number of her films previously flopping, Kiran's career began to fluctuate. Uryangalil turned to be a critical box-office hit, and was declared a cult classic and a superhit film.

In the next year, Kiran had made guest and cameo appearances in a few films, including Andar Baahar, in which she'd worked with Danny Denzongpa and Kim once again. She was cast in the lead role in the Tamil language film Bandham, along Sivaji Ganesan. In spite of the film being a box-office failure, it helped Kiran show her versatility. Later that year, she then was cast as Banu in the film Aandhi-Toofan, along Hema Malini and the late Shashi Kapoor. The film had turned to be one of the highest-grossing films of the year, and was a commercial hit at the box-office, further helping Kiran's career.

In 1986, Kiran's first role of the year was in the supporting character Savitri, starring with the late actress Sridevi and once again starring with Jeetendra in the film Ghar Sansar. The film was a success at the box-office, and turned to be one of the highest-grossing films of that year. She starred in two other films that year, Daku Bijlee and as Shobha in Inteqam Ki Aag, in which both turned out to be commercial disappointments.

In the year following, Kiran only starred in one film. She starred as Saroj in the film Muqaddar Ka Faisla with Raaj Kumar and Rakhee. The film was a failure at the box office. The majority of her films in this period turned to be box-office bombs, which led to Kiran's career begin to heavily fluctuate. Eventually, Kiran retired the film industry in 1990, in order to focus on her marriage with her spouse. Kiran's last five films, Deewane, Qurbani Rang Layegi, Rajoo Dada, and Aakhri Sanghursh, were released in the years following her retirement. She maintained her popularity by being part of Vikram Aur Betaal serial from 1985 to 1988.

=== Contract misconception ===
While Kiran was shooting for Hum Kisise Kum Naheen, the director, Nasir Hussain, had told her not to sign any further films until after the film was released and the results were out. However, even after the release and success of the film, other directors and producers did not approach her for films as they were under the belief that a contract had been in place between Kiran and Hussain. She'd lost chances for films such as Balika Badhu and Ankhiyon Ke Jharokhon Se, which went on to be critically and commercially successful. Kiran never commented on or discussed these misunderstandings.

== Personal life ==
Kiran later married someone whose identity she did not disclose, and promptly moved to the Netherlands following her retirement in 1990.

== Filmography ==
Kiran appeared in a total of 44 films from 1977 to 1990.

Year	Film	Role	Notes
1977	Hum Kisise Kum Naheen	Kajal Kisharina	
1980	Maang Bharo Sajana	Geeta Sinha	
1980	Morchha	Guest Dancer	
1980	Saajan Mere Main Saajan Ki		
1980	Saboot	Kaajal	
1981	Hum Se Badkar Kaun	Kajri	
1981	Bhula Na Dena		
1981	Wardat	Kajal Malhotra	
1981	Dahshat	Sunita	Uncredited
1982	Sahasa Simha	Rekha	Kannada film
1982	Hum Paagal Premee		
1982	Geet Ganga		
1982	Doosra Roop		
1982	Maine Jeena Seekh Liya	Lajjo	
1982	Jeeo Aur Jeene Do		
1983	Lalach		
1983	Karate	Geeta	
1983	Greed		
1983	Ek Baar Chale Aao	Priya	
1983	Dharti Aakash		
1983	Hum Se Hai Zamana	Chhutki	
1984	Chakkarayumma	Vineetha Mathews	Malayalam film
1984	Uyarangalil	Devi Menon	Malayalam film
1984	Mohabbat Ka Masiha		
1984	Ram Tera Desh	Guest Dancer	
1985	Star Ten		
1985	Maujaan Dubai Diyaan	Guest Dancer	
1985	Andar Baahar	Herself	
1985	Bhago Bhut Aaya	Manorama's niece	
1985	Bandham	Mary	Tamil film
1985	Ee Lokam Evide Kure Manushyar	Jameela	Malayalam film
1985	Do Dilan Ki Dastaan	Aarti Verma	
1985	Aandhi-Toofan	Bhanu	
1985	Mujhe Kasam Hai	Rita	
1985	Main Khilona Nahin		
1986	Ghar Sansar	Savitri	
1986	Daku Bijlee		
1986	Inteqam Ki Aag	Shobha	
1987	Muqaddar Ka Faisla	Saroj	
1988	7 Bijliyaan	Bevdi	
1989	Saaya	Ruby	
1989	Aurat Aur Patthar		
1991	Deewane		Released after her retirement
1991	Qurbani Rang Layegi	Chutki	Released after her retirement
1992	Rajoo Dada		Released after her retirement
1997	Aakhri Sanghursh		Released after her retirement

== See also ==
- List of Indian film actresses
