= Samir Ganguly =

Indian film director

- Occupation: Film director

Samir Ganguly is an Indian film director. He also directed many episodes of the television serial Paying Guest.

== Filmography ==
=== Director ===
year	Movie(s)
1967	Shagird
1971	Sharmeelee
1975	Jaggu
1975	Koi Jeeta Koi Haara
1976	Deewaangee
1978	Anjane Mein
1978	Phandebaaz
1981	Khoon Ka Rishta
1983	Pakhandee

=== Assistant director ===
- Tumsa Nahin Dekha (1957)
- Junglee (1961)
- April Fool (1964)

=== TV serials ===
- Paying Guest - Some episodes Rajshri Productions
