= M. Ramalingam =

Indian literary critic

Ma. Ramalingam
- Born: Ma. Ramalingam; 1939 (age 86–87)
- Writing career
- Language: Tamil
- Genres: Short Story, Novel, Novella
- Subject: Literature
- Notable awards: Sahitya Akademi Award (1981)

M. Ramalingam (b. 1939), is a Tamil literary critic, poet, author and translator from Tamil Nadu, India. He is the recipient of the 1981 Sahitya Akademi Award for Tamil . He is popularly known as Ezhil mudhalvan. His works serve as the source of much research in the field of Tamil fiction.

== Early life ==
Ma. Ramalingam was born on October 5, 1930, to V. Manickam and Ma. Ramamrutha Ammaiyar in Thiruthuraipoondi. He did his higher education in Thiruthuraipoondi and his Tamil B.A. in Kumbakonam Government College. He then did his M.A. at Madras Presidency College and was awarded four gold medals for securing the first rank.

== Career ==
He joined the Tamil Nadu Educational Service in 1964 and later became professor and head of the Tamil department at Government Arts College, Kumbakonam. He obtained his PhD in Tamil literature in 1975 from the University of Madras. He was mentored by Mu. Varadarajan. He worked as an assistant professor at Madras Presidency College from 1964 to 1974. He went on to serve as the head professor at Mannargudi, Ramanathapuram, Coimbatore, Rasipuram, Ponneri and Kumbakonam colleges.

Ramalingam was a member of the General Council and Executive Committee of the Sahitya Akademi from 1988-92. He was also a member of the 'Tamil Nadu Poets' group,' run by K.A.P. Viswanatham, for twenty years.

He retired as the head of the Tamil Department at Bharathidasan University, Tiruchirappalli from 1985 to 2000. In November 2024, the Tamil Nadu government honoured his contributions to Tamil literature and nationalized his works.

== Literary work ==
Ramalingam's first collection of poems was published in 1965. His first poem Sweet Memories was published in 1966 by the Kuil magazine run by Bharathidasan. He wrote many poems in the magazine 'Ilakiyam', run by poet Suratha. Ramalingam was a close associate of poets Bharathidasan, Perumazhi and Suratha.

He has written seven volumes of Tamil literary criticism and has won several awards for his work. In 1981, Ramalingam was awarded the Sahitya Akademi Award for Tamil for his critical work on modern Tamil prose Pudhiya Urai Nadai (lit. The New Prose).

He translated Indian literature from English into Tamil. He translated Rabindranath Tagore's book Kabirdas's Hundred Songs from English into Tamil. This book was published by 'Tamil Wave' publishing house in 2011, the 150th birth anniversary of Tagore.

He has participated as a researcher in several seminars and workshops in many countries such as Malaysia, Yugoslavia, and Singapore.

== See also ==
- List of Sahitya Akademi Award winners for Tamil
- List of Indian writers
- List of Tamil-language writers
