= Neeta Mehta =

Indian actress

Neeta Mehta (born to a Gujarati family in 1956) is a former actress in films and an author. She appeared in about 40 films including Rishta Kagaz Ka, Ponga Pandit, Aurat Aurat Aurat, Hero (1983 film) and Patthar Se Takkar.

She was born to a Gujarati family. One of her roles was as a dacoit.

Leaving the materialistic way of life, she became a swami. In the sanyas she adopted the name Swami Nityanand Giri. She also runs a YouTube channel for her preaches.

== Filmography ==
- Meenakshi Murthy (1974), diploma film
- Ponga Pandit (1975)
- Main Tulsi Tere Aangan Ki (1979)
- Hum Se Badhkar Kaun (1981)
- Khoon Ki Takkar (1981) as Sapna
- Naari (1981)
- Ram Ki Ganga (1981)
- Kaamchor (1982)
- Rishta Kagaz Ka (1983) as Roopa
- Swarag Se Sunder (1986) as Dr. Leelavati Special Guest Appearance
- Sultanat (1986) as Special Guest Appearance
- Rajoo Dada (1992) as Bijli
- Basti Badmishon Ki (1992)
- Aurat Aurat Aurat (1996) as Savitri
- Patthar Se Takkar
