= Mera Faisla =

- Directed by: Rajendra Singh Babu
- Written by: Kader Khan (dialogues)
- Screenplay by: Prayag Raj
- Produced by: Ranjit Virk
- Starring: Sanjay Dutt; Jaya Prada; Rati Agnihotri
- Cinematography: PS Prakash
- Edited by: Waman Bhonsle; Guru Dutt Shirali
- Music by: Laxmikant–Pyarelal; Lyrics: Anand Bakshi
- Production company: Ranjit Films
- Release date: 6 April 1984
- Language: Hindi

Mera Faisla (transl. My Decision) is a 1984 Indian Hindi-language film directed by Rajendra Singh Babu. The movie stars Sanjay Dutt, Jaya Prada, Rati Agnihotri in pivotal roles. It was a commercial failure.

== Cast ==
- Sanjay Dutt as Raj Saxena
- Jaya Prada as Nisha Dhawan
- Rati Agnihotri as Rati Verma
- Nirupa Roy as Mrs. Saxena
- Shakti Kapoor as Tony
- Kader Khan as Jacob
- Pran as Police Commissioner Rana
- Parikshit Sahni as Inspector Anand Saxena
- Pinchoo Kapoor as Major Verma
- Satyen Kappu as Dhawan
- Shubha Khote as Girls Hostel Warden Principal
- Yunus Parvez as Boys Hostel Warden Principal
- Rajendra Nath as Jaleel Miyan
- Asrani as Photographer

== Soundtrack ==
Lyrics: Anand Bakshi

Song	Singer
"Allah Meri Laaj Bachana"	Mahesh Kumar
"Mere Aane Ki Khabar Kar Do"	Shailendra Singh
"Idhar Ho Raha Hai, Udhar Ho Raha Hai"	Shabbir Kumar, Asha Bhosle
"Mera Ek Deewana Mujhe Telephone Karta Hai"	Suresh Wadkar, Asha Bhosle
"Photographer Jaldi Kar"	Asha Bhosle

== Production ==
Sanjay Dutt sporting women's outfits in one of the scenes was called a "dreadful" act by Mid-Day.
