= Ghar Sansar =

- Theatrical release poster
- Directed by: K. Bapayya
- Written by: Kader Khan (dialogues); Indeevar (lyrics)
- Screenplay by: Gyandev Agnihotri; Ravi
- Story by: Aakella Venkata Suryanarayana
- Based on: Maga Maharaju (1983)
- Produced by: Vimal Kumar
- Starring: Jeetendra; Sridevi
- Cinematography: A. Venkatesh
- Edited by: Prakash Dave
- Music by: Rajesh Roshan
- Production company: Shivam Chitrya
- Release date: 11 July 1986
- Running time: 144 minutes
- Country: India
- Language: Hindi

Ghar Sansar (transl. Complete Household) is a 1986 Indian Hindi-language drama film, produced by Vimal Kumar under the Shivam Chitrya banner and directed by K. Bapayya. It stars Jeetendra, Sridevi and music composed by Rajesh Roshan. The film is remake of the Telugu movie Maga Maharaju (1983), starring Chiranjeevi, Suhasini in the pivotal roles.

== Cast ==
- Jeetendra as Prakash
- Sridevi as Radha
- Kader Khan as Girdharilal / Bankelal (Double Role)
- Ranjeet as David
- Shakti Kapoor as Ringo
- Shreeram Lagoo as Satyanarayan
- Sulochana Latkar as Laxmi
- Gulshan Grover as Chandan "Munna"
- Deepika as Tulsi
- Kaajal Kiran as Savitri
- Lalita Pawar as Sarojini, Satyanarayan's mother
- Ravi Baswani as Banwari
- Padma Khanna as Ganga, Banwari's wife
- Aruna Irani as Saudamani
- Bharat Bhushan as Rahim Chacha
- Yunus Parvez as Kishanlal
- Pinchoo Kapoor as Interviewer Bhargav
- Vikas Anand as Mohan, Savitri's husband
- Rajendra Nath as Inspector Gopichand Sharma
- Anjana Mumtaz as Mrs. Girdharilal
- Rajesh Puri as Moti , David's henchman
- Tej Sapru as Pratap, Ringo's friend
- Thavakalai Chittibabu as Bankelal's son Chotu

== Soundtrack ==
Lyrics: Indeevar

Song	Singer
"Chot Lagi Kahan, Yahan Wahan"	Kishore Kumar, Asha Bhosle
"Jeevan Ke Raste Mein, Jeet Unki Jo Chalte Hai, Himmat Se Hi, Mehnat Se Hi To Bhag Badalte Hai"	Kishore Kumar, Alka Yagnik, Mohammed Aziz
"Ghar Tere Aaungi Dulhan Banke"	Asha Bhosle, Mohammed Aziz
"Meri Oonchi Nahin Deewaar"	Alka Yagnik
"Haath Seeta Ka Ram Ko Diya" (Female)	Anuradha Paudwal
"Haath Seeta Ka Ram Ko Diya" (Male)	Mohammed Aziz
