= Yar (gene) =

Non-coding DNA

In molecular biology, Yar (yellow-achaete intergenic RNA) is a long non-coding RNA found in Drosophila. It is located within a neuronal gene cluster between the yellow and achaete genes. It is found in the cytoplasm of cells and is required for the regulation of sleep.

== See also ==
- Long noncoding RNA
