= Rajoo Dada =

- DVD Cover
- Directed by: D. S. Azaad
- Screenplay by: S. Subhash
- Story by: S. Subhash
- Produced by: Balwant Singh Suri
- Starring: Mithun Chakraborty; Vijayendra Ghatge; Kajal Kiran; Neeta Mehta
- Cinematography: V. Ratra
- Edited by: Sudhakar N.
- Music by: Usha Khanna
- Release date: 31 January 1992
- Running time: 135 min.
- Country: India
- Language: Hindi

Rajoo Dada is a 1992 Indian Hindi-language film directed by D. S. Azaad. The film stars Mithun Chakraborty, Vijayendra Ghatge, Kajal Kiran, Neeta Mehta in lead roles. Even though the film was censored in 1990, it had a theatrical release only in 1992.

== Plot ==
Rajesh is a CBI officer whose father and mother was killed by Daku Jawala on a Diwali night. Rajesh's smaller brother Rakesh, a Police Inspector was brought up by Police Commissioner while Rajesh himself was brought up by Col Tanej. Jawala now is a smuggler and lives in Mumbai as a businessman with another smuggler Vikram. Ultimately two brothers finally catch him when Jawala tries to triple cross Vikram and kills him.

== Cast ==
- Mithun Chakraborty as CBI Officer Rajesh Chandra / Rajoo Dada
- Vijayendra Ghatge as Inspector Rakesh Chandra
- Kajal Kiran as Lily
- Neeta Mehta as Bijli
- Heena Kausar as Munni
- Raza Murad as Vikram Singh
- Kader Khan as Jwala Daku / RC
- Shreeram Lagoo as Colonel Taneja
- Chand Usmani as Ranjana, Rakesh's foster mother
- Chandrashekhar as Inspector Raj Bahadur Devi Chandra
- Yunus Parvez as Constable Makru
- Mushtaq Khan as Inspector Parvez
- Sumithra as an item number
