= Muqaddar Ka Faisla =

- Directed by: Prakash Mehra
- Written by: Kader Khan (Dialogues)
- Screenplay by: Prakash Mehra; Laxmikant Sharma
- Produced by: Yash Johar
- Starring: Raaj Kumar; Raakhee; Raj Babbar; Meenakshi Sheshadri; Akbar Khan; Tina Munim; Vijayendra Ghatge; Kajal Kiran; Pran
- Cinematography: N. Satyen
- Edited by: Jayant Adhikari; Shyam Gupte
- Music by: Bappi Lahiri
- Production company: Dharma Productions
- Release date: 31 July 1987
- Country: India
- Language: Hindi

Muqaddar Ka Faisla (transl. Decision of fate) is a 1987 Indian Hindi-language action film directed by Prakash Mehra and produced by Yash Johar. It stars Raaj Kumar, Raakhee, Raj Babbar, Meenakshi Sheshadri, Akbar Khan, Tina Munim, Vijayendra Ghatge, Kajal Kiran in pivotal roles. The music was composed by Bappi Lahiri.

== Plot ==
An honest Hindu pandit (priest) is framed for embezzlement and rape, and not only dismissed from employment, but also arrested and imprisoned, leaving behind his family in destitution. On his return from prison, he is unable to locate his family, and plans to avenge his humiliation. But the challenge is that how can a former pandit, ex-convict, penniless, homeless, and without any resources, avenge himself against the cunning and manipulative people who framed him?

== Cast ==
- Raaj Kumar as Pandit Krishnakant
- Raakhee as Rukmini
- Raj Babbar as Raj
- Meenakshi Seshadri as Meena
- Akbar Khan as Dr. Harish Kumar
- Tina Munim as Nisha
- Vijayendra Ghatge as Inspector Shekhar
- Kajal Kiran as Saroj
- Bindu as Mona
- Ranjeet as Chaddha
- Pran as Dhanraj
- Om Prakash as Dayaram
- Dinesh Hingoo as Swarnmukhi
- Satyendra Kapoor as Chhaganlal

== Music ==
Lyrics: Anjaan

Song	Singer
"Jo Hum Kaam Karte Hain"	Kishore Kumar
"Na Kal Ka Pata"	Kishore Kumar
"Aaj Humko Aadmi Ki Pehchan Ho Gayi, Zindagi Se Mulaqat Bhi Aasan Ho Gayi"	Kishore Kumar, Mohammed Aziz
"Kanhaiya Ji Ne Janam Liyo Re"	Kishore Kumar, Asha Bhosle
"Hum Na Hum Rahe"	Asha Bhosle
"Hay Yeh Paisa"	Asha Bhosle
