= Karate (film) =

- Promotional Poster
- Directed by: Deb Mukerji
- Screenplay by: Deb Mukherji; Additional screenplay: Dinesh Thakkar; S. H. Bihari
- Dialogues by: Bengali: Gauriprasanna Mazumder; Deb Mukerji; Hindi: S. H. Bihari
- Story by: Deb Mukerji
- Produced by: Deb Mukerji
- Starring: Mithun Chakraborty; Deb Mukerji; Yogeeta Bali; Kaajal Kiran; Kader Khan
- Cinematography: Joe D' Souza
- Edited by: Keshav Hirani
- Music by: Bappi Lahiri
- Release date: 9 December 1983
- Running time: 135 minutes
- Country: India
- Language: Bengali

Karate is a 1983 Indian Bengali-language martial arts action film written, produced and directed by Deb Mukherji in his directorial debut, under the banner of Mukerji International. The film stars Mithun Chakraborty and Mukerji himself as two brothers separated in their childhood, reuniting as martial artists to avenge the death of their scientist father. It also features Kaajal Kiran, Yogeeta Bali and Kader Khan in other pivotal roles, with Mazhar Khan in a special appearance.

== Plot ==
A scientist creates a diamond that focuses the sun's rays and burns through anything in its path. He hides the diamond inside a necklace. In a bid to get the diamond, Khan (played by Kader Khan) kills the scientist. The scientist's sons, Desh and Vijay, had been training in karate, but they are separated from each other and their mother. Vijay is raised by his karate instructor, while Desh grows up in a Romani camp, where he befriends Imran (played by Mazhar Khan). Khan tracks down the karate instructor, but he kills himself before Khan can torture him for information about the scientist's missing sons and the necklace. Before he dies, the instructor gives the necklace to Vijay, who later entrusts it to his girlfriend, Aarti — the instructor's daughter — for safekeeping. Together, Vijay and Aarti raid Khan's illegal warehouses and kill many of his men. Meanwhile, Desh and Imran grow up to become master thieves and pickpockets. Khan goes to Aarti's house to kill her and steal the necklace. Aarti jumps out of the window using a rope ladder. However, she loses the necklace, which Desh finds while burgling the same building. He realises that it is his mother's necklace, in which his father has hidden a priceless diamond. When Khan and his henchmen see Desh stealing the necklace, they raid his house. Meanwhile, Vijay arrives to save Aarti. Khan and his henchmen try to snatch the necklace from Desh, as does Vijay. Desh escapes by disguising himself as a groom and joining a wedding procession. He accidentally marries Geeta, but refuses to acknowledge her as his wife and leaves without looking at her face. While fleeing with the necklace, he is chased by the police and Vijay, who shoots him. Injured, he seeks refuge in his mother's house. Khan's henchmen try to kill Desh, but Geeta saves him. Geeta and Desh escape on a train. The villains also board the train, but Desh beats them up before they can catch him. He takes her to the Roma camp, where she fights Zora. Vijay attacks Desh at the Romani camp, but Imran comes to his rescue. Geeta reveals to Desh that she is his wife, and he acknowledges her. Meanwhile, Khan discovers that Desh is the scientist's long-lost eldest son. He also learns that Desh loves Imran as if he were his own brother. Khan kills Imran in such a way that Vijay becomes the prime suspect. Khan also kills Aarti, and Vijay suspects Desh of the murder. The two brothers are now out to get each other. While fighting over the necklace, they realise that they are brothers and that it was Khan who killed Imran and Aarti. Desh and Vijay join forces and decide to avenge their father by killing Khan. Khan organises a karate competition, inviting the world's most renowned fighters and paying them to kill the two brothers. During the competition, the brothers kill all the fighters, including Khan, and are reunited with their mother.

== Cast ==
- Mithun Chakraborty as Vijay
- Deb Mukherjee as Desh
- Kaajal Kiran as Geeta
- Yogeeta Bali as Aarti
- Prema Narayan as Zora
- Kader Khan as Khan
- Mazhar Khan as Imran

== Songs ==
Song	Singer
"Ae Maa"	Kishore Kumar, Amit Kumar
"Do Deewane"	Kishore Kumar, Amit Kumar
"Karate Karate"	Bappi Lahiri, Amit Kumar
"Tum Tum Tumba"	Bappi Lahiri
"Yeh Salaam Aakhri"	Asha Bhosle
"Baazi Pyar Ki"	Asha Bhosle
"Ae Maa"	Gurmeet Kaur, Kavita Arun
