= Yaarana =

Yaarana or Yaraana may refer to:

- Yaarana (1981 film), a 1981 Indian musical drama film directed by Rakesh Kumar
- Yaraana (1995 film), a 1995 Indian romantic thriller film
- Yaarana (2015 film), a 2015 Indian Punjabi-language film

== See also ==
- Yaar? (disambiguation)
