= Khoon Ka Rishta =

- Theatrical release poster
- Directed by: Samir Ganguly
- Written by: Aziz Qaisi (dialogues); Majrooh Sultanpuri (lyrics)
- Screenplay by: Tarun Ghosh; Charandas Shokh
- Story by: Sharad Pilgaonkar
- Produced by: Siraj Darpan; Amar Roy; Harilal J Thakker; Kusumlata J Thakker
- Starring: Jeetendra; Neetu Singh; Amjad Khan; Pran
- Cinematography: Munir Khan
- Edited by: V.K. Naik
- Music by: Kalyanji Anandji
- Production company: Sangtarash Internanationals
- Release date: 12 August 1981
- Running time: 117 minutes
- Country: India
- Language: Hindi

Khoon Ka Rishta (transl. Blood Relation) is a 1981 Hindi-language action film, produced by Siraj Darpan, Amar Roy, Harilal J. Thakker and Kusumlata J. Thakker under the Sangtarash Internanationals banner and directed by Samir Ganguly. It stars Jeetendra, Neetu Singh, Amjad Khan, Pran and music composed by Kalyanji Anandji.

== Cast ==
- Jeetendra as Ravi S Sinha
- Neetu Singh as Sonia
- Amjad Khan as Kailash
- Pran as Justice Surendra Sinha

== Soundtrack ==
All songs are written by Majrooh Sultanpuri.

#	Title	Singer(s)
1	"Are Pyar Bhi Nahi"	Kishore Kumar
2	"Chahe Pyar Ka Khiladi"	Kishore Kumar, Asha Bhosle
3	"Ae Kagaz Ko Phenko"	Lata Mangeshkar
4	"Are Chamki Zara"	Mohammed Rafi, Usha Mangeshkar
5	"Ek Cheez Hai Tumhare"	Usha Mangeshkar
6	"Tere Rang Mein"	Usha Mangeshkar
