= Vijayendra Ghatge =

Indian actor

- Born: 1950 (age 75–76)
- Occupation: Actor
- Years active: 1976–2011
- Spouse: Avantika Ghatge
- Children: 1
- Relatives: Sagarika Ghatge (niece)
- Website: www.vijayendra.in

Vijayendra Ghatge (born 1950) is an Indian actor in Bollywood film and television. He is known for the musical superhit movie Chitchor (1976). His other famous movies include Prem Rog (1982), Devdas (2002) and Jhankaar Beats (2003).

== Background and education ==
Ghatge is a member of the Maratha royal family of Kagal estate, which was a feudatory vassal of Kolhapur State. He is thus a relative of the Maharaja of Kolhapur, as Chhatrapati Shahu was adopted from Kagal and placed on the Gadi of Kolhapur. Ghatge's mother, Sitaraje Ghatge, is the daughter of Maharaja Tukoji Rao Holkar III of Indore (reigned 1903–1926) by his American-born third wife Nancy Miller (who was formally adopted by the Maharaja's aunt and took the name Sharmishtha Devi Holkar upon marrying the Maharaja). He is the paternal uncle of Indian actress Sagarika Ghatge (married to Indian cricketer Zaheer Khan), sometimes mistaken to be her father.

He is married to Avantika Ghatge who was formerly head of department of Fine Arts at the Daly College in Indore. They have a daughter Umikaa Ghatge, who studied at the Daly College and is a freelance content writer.

After doing B.Com Honours (Management) from Sydenham College of Commerce, Bombay Vijayendra graduated in acting course from the FTII, Pune.

== Career ==
Ghatge started his film career with a supporting role in Rajshri Productions' 1976 Hindi film Chitchor. Directed by Basu Chatterjee, the film was a box office "Superhit". Thereafter, he did various supporting roles in films like Kasme Vaade (1978), Tere Pyar Mein, Prem Rog (1982) and Razia Sultan (1983). In the mid-1980s, Ghatge began appearing in television serials. His character role of Lala Vrishbhaan, played in the 1986–87 classic serial Buniyaad made him a household name.

In 2002, Ghatge appeared in the Sanjay Leela Bhansali directed Devdas in the role of Bhuvan Choudhary, the ageing husband of the heroine, Paro, played by Aishwarya Rai.

== Filmography ==
=== Films ===
Year	Film	Role	Notes
1976	Chitchor	Sunil Kishan	
1977	Agar... If	Vijay Sohni	
1978	Anpadh	Mukesh	
1978	Yatheema Sundari	Vahid	
1978	Kasme Vaade	Kundan Ghanshyamdas	
1978	Tere Pyar Mein		
1979	Sunayana	Dr. Indrajeet	
1979	Shaayad		
1980	Nazrana Pyar Ka	Kishore	
1980	Aakhri Insaaf		
1980	Ehsan Aapka		
1980	Guest House	Suraj	
1981	Dhanwan		
1981	Paanch Qaidi		
1981	Hum Se Badkar Kaun	Ballu/DSP Vijay	
1981	Jyoti	Niranjan Pratap Singh	
1982	Prem Rog	Kunwar Narendra Singh	
1982	Satte Pe Satta	Shekhar	
1982	Jeeo Aur Jeene Do		
1982	Maut Ka Saya		
1982	Waqt Waqt Ki Baat		
1983	Razia Sultan	Amil Altunia	
1984	Ram Ki Ganga	Arun 'Suraj' Verma	
1984	Ram Tera Desh	Prem Kumar Saxena	
1984	Waqt Ki Pukar	Raja	
1984	Divorce	Ajay Oswal/Shyam	
1984	Hanste Khelte		
1985	Meraa Ghar Mere Bachche	Dr. Shrikant Bhargav	
1985	Pournami Raavil 3D		Malayalam 3D film
1985	Mehak		
1985	Kali Basti	Inspector Raghuvanshi	
1986	Sheesha	Advocate Ashok Kumar	
1986	Locket	Vijay	
1986	Trikon Ka Chauta Kon		
1986	Dahleez	Ahmed Ali	
1986	Katha Sagar		TV series
1987	Muqaddar Ka Faisla	Police Inspector Shekhar	
1988	Mohabbat Ke Dushman	Shamsher	
1988	Veerana	Sameer Pratap	
1988	Shahenshah	Mohammed Salim	
1988	Yateem	Senior Police Officer	
1989	Batwara	Devan	
1989	Tridev	Ramesh Tejani	
1989	Souten Ki Beti	Advocate Narendra	
1989	Ajeeb Itefaq	Aparna's boyfriend	
1989	Guru	Inspector Shiv Shankar Shrivastav	
1989	Naqab	Nawab Sajhat Ali Khan	
1990	Bandh Darwaza	Thakur Pratap Singh	
1990	Lekin...	Raja Param Singh	
1991	Indrajeet	Inspector Sudhir	
1991	Aakhri Cheekh	Rahul Kumar	
1991	Sanam Bewafa	Sajjan Thakur	
1991	Ek Doctor Ki Maut	Dr. Arijit	
1992	Apradhi	Man outside the orphanage	
1992	Bekhudi	Radhika's Father	
1992	Khel	Ravi	
1993	Damini - Lightning	Inspector Kadam	
1993	Kshatriya	Raja Davendra Pratap Singh	
1993	Anth	Advocate Vikas Saxena	
1994	Maza Saubhagya	Ahant Abhyankar	Marathi Film (cameo)
1994	Vaade Iraade	Principal Tripathi	
1994	Beta Ho To Aisa	Forest Officer Anand	
1995	Guddu	Rehman	
1996	Rajkumar		
1997	Aakhri Sanghursh	Arjun	
1998	Kareeb	Diwan Virendranath	
1999	Love You Hamesha		
2000	Siyani		TV movie
2001	Shirdi Sai Baba (2001)		
2002	Jeena Sirf Merre Liye	Pooja's dad	
2002	Deewangee	Ashwin Mehta	
2002	Devdas	Bhuvan Choudhry	
2002	Kabhie Tum Kabhie Hum	Mr. Shrivastav	
2003	Jhankaar Beats	Mr. Kapoor	
2003	Tujhe Meri Kasam		
2004	Wajahh: A Reason to Kill	Singhania	
2004	Garv: Pride and Honour	Chief Minister	
2005	Chand Sa Roshan Chehra		
2006	Shaadi Se Pehle	Mr. Bhalla	
2007	Marigold	Rajput	
2008	Karma: Crime. Passion. Reincarnation	Ranvir Singh	
2010	Foggy Christmas	Simon	
2010	Life Express	Tanvi's boss	
2011	Aazaan	Home Minister	

=== Television ===
Year	Serial	Role	Channel	Notes
1985	Singhasan Battisi	Raja Vikramaditya	DD National	
1985	Vikram Aur Betaal (Episode: The Unsuccessful Penance of Gunkar)	Gunkar	DD National	
1986–1987	Buniyaad	Lala Vrishbhan	DD National	
1992	Missione d'amore	Mansingh		
1992	Talaash	Sudhir	DD National	
1994	Junoon	adv.Neil Bhatiya	DD National	
1998–1999	Ashiqui		Zee TV	
2003	Vishwaas	Vishwanath Dikshit	Zee TV	
