= Meri Aawaz Suno =

- Theatrical release poster
- Directed by: S. V. Rajendra Singh Babu
- Written by: Kader Khan (dialogues)
- Screenplay by: S. V. Rajendra Singh Babu
- Story by: H. k. ANANTARAM
- Based on: Antha (1981)
- Produced by: G. Hanumantha Rao; Krishna (Presents)
- Starring: Jeetendra; Hema Malini; Parveen Babi
- Cinematography: S Prakash
- Edited by: K. Gopala Rao
- Music by: Laxmikant-Pyarelal
- Production company: Padmalaya Studios
- Release date: 23 November 1981
- Running time: 153 minutes
- Country: India
- Language: Hindi

Meri Aawaz Suno (transl. Listen to my Voice) is a 1981 Indian Hindi-language action thriller film, directed by S. V. Rajendra Singh Babu, produced by G. Hanumantha Rao by Padmalaya Studios, and presented by Krishna. It stars Jeetendra, Hema Malini and Parveen Babi. The music is composed by Laxmikant-Pyarelal. The film is a remake of the Kannada movie Antha (1981).

== Plot ==
Inspector Sushil Kumar is a sincere & transparent cop who dedicated his life to the nation. He lives with his pregnant wife Sunita and mother Kamini Devi. Kanwar Lal, a dreadful gangster who is presently in prison resembles Sushil. Utilizing this, CBI Director Sangram Singh plans an operation "End' which involves Sushil impersonating Kanwar Lal, since he is influential in the criminal underworld. Pretending to be a gangster, Sushil joins a gang that creates mayhem in the country. Despite being aware of his mother’s death, Sushil stands strong. Furthermore, he succeeds in acquiring pieces of evidence against the gang. Unfortunately, his identity is revealed, and the gang seize him. Nevertheless, he safeguards the proof for which gang subject him to severe torture. They fetch Sunita and slaughter her along with the baby in her womb. Devastated, Sushil escapes from their clutches, reaches Sangram Singh and he too double-crosses him. Then, the enraged Sushil ceases the gang, surrenders before the judiciary, and seeks justice.

== Cast ==
- Jeetendra as Inspector Sushil Kumar / Kanwarlal (Double role)
- Hema Malini as Mrs. Sunita Kumar
- Parveen Babi as Rita
- Kader Khan as Topiwala
- Shakti Kapoor as Azad
- Ranjeet as Rony
- Asrani as Bahadur
- Vijay Arora as CBI Agent Kulwant
- Om Shivpuri as CBI Officer Sangram Singh
- Urmila Bhatt as Kamini Devi (Sushil's Mother)
- Pinchoo Kapoor as Minister
- Raj Mehra as IGP Shankar Kumar
- Rajan Haksar as Madan
- Manmohan Krishna as Dawood
- Tamanna as Shobha (Sushil's Sister)
- Yunus Parvez as Halkatlal
- Jayshree T. as Bar Dancer
- Praveen Kumar as Justin

== Soundtrack ==
Lyrics: Anand Bakshi

Song	Singer
"Hay, Kya Soch Rahi Ho, Kuch Soch Rahi Hoon"	Kishore Kumar, Asha Bhosle
"Mehmanon Ko Salaam Hai Mera, Naam Zara Badnaam Hai Mera"	Kishore Kumar, Asha Bhosle
"Gudiya Ri Gudiya Tu Batla"	Asha Bhosle
"Gudiya Ri Gudiya Tu Batla" (Sad)	Asha Bhosle
"Tumhe Dekha Hai To Aisa Lagta"	Asha Bhosle
"Achha Hua Tum Mil Gaye"	Asha Bhosle

== Reception ==
Chander Singh Uday of India Today wrote that "Although it may become a hit, Aawaz is nonetheless an appallingly bad film. The film shows a complete lack of coherence which is only partly covered by the repeated and quite unnecessary violence. Characters are introduced whenever a need is felt for them and then dropped without a vestige of explanation".
