= Hum Se Badkar Kaun =

Hum Se Badhkar Kaun
- Poster
- Directed by: Deepak Bahry
- Produced by: Pranlal Mehta
- Starring: Mithun Chakraborty; Amjad Khan; Danny Denzongpa; Vijayendra Ghatge; Ranjeeta Kaur; Kajal Kiran
- Music by: Raamlaxman
- Production company: Prathima Films
- Release date: 3 July 1981
- Running time: 139 minutes
- Country: India
- Language: Hindi

Hum Se Badhkar Kaun is a 1981 Indian Hindi-language action-adventure film directed by Deepak Bahry, starring Mithun Chakraborty, Vijayendra Ghatge, Ranjeeta, Amjad Khan, Danny Denzongpa, Kajal Kiran and Ranjeet.

== Plot ==
Radha lives a poor lifestyle with her husband, Mohan, and four sons, Chandan, Raju, Bablu, and Pappu. Although Mohan comes from a rich family, his dad had disapproved of his marriage, and since that day he has not met with him. Now his dad is very ill and the entire family goes to visit him, and are welcomed with open arms. Before he dies, he shows Mohan the family's treasure, which consists of gold and jewellery, hidden under a temple, which can only be opened by four different keys. Mohan asks his children to keep one key. Then his dad dies, and Lalchand, an employee, who has overheard the conversation between father and son decides to keep the treasure to himself. He ends up killing Mohan, getting himself arrested and sentenced to a long prison term. Alone and widowed, Radha, gets separated from her sons and loses her mind. Years later the sons have grown up. Chandan calls himself Bholaram and runs a dairy farm; Raju is a career thief and burglar and goes by the name of Johny; Bablu is the DSP of Police, Vijay; while the youngest, Pappu, also has taken to a life of crime and calls himself Tony. The lives of these four young men are all set to collide with each other with Bholaram and Vijay on the side of the law, and Johny and Tony on the run from them. The question that comes to mind is will the four brothers ever get to meet their mom in this lifetime, and what of the treasure that is still buried beneath the temple?

== Cast ==
- Amjad Khan as Chandan / Bholaram
- Danny Denzongpa as Raju / Johny
- Vijayendra Ghatge as Bablu / DSP Vijay
- Mithun Chakraborty as Pappu / Tony
- Ranjeeta Kaur as Tina
- Kajal Kiran as Rekha
- Purnima as Radha
- Ranjeet as Lalchand
- Neeta Mehta as Jina
- Padmini Kapila as Kammo
- Kalpana Iyer as chalu Shalu accomplice of Lalchand

== Soundtrack ==
Lyrics: Ravinder Rawal

#	Song	Singer
1	"Masti Ka Main Jaam Hoon"	Kishore Kumar
2	"Deva Ho Deva, Ganpati Deva, Tum Se Badhkar Kaun, Swami Tumse Badhkar Kaun"	Asha Bhosle, Mohammed Rafi, Bhupinder Singh, Shailendra Singh, Sapan Chakraborty
3	"Dekho Logon, Yeh Kaisa Zamana, Dil Churake Bane Woh Begaana"	Asha Bhosle, Mohammed Rafi
4	"Huyi Umar Yeh"	Asha Bhosle
5	"Kammoji"	Mahendra Kapoor, Usha Mangeshkar
6	"Sapnon Ka Gharonda Toota"	Bhupinder Singh
