= Dev Kumar =

Dalit Writer

Dev Kumar (born 4 February 1972) is a Dalit writer and dramatist from India. A member of the Bhangi community, he established the Apna Theatre in April 1992. This has performed in Kanpur and surrounding areas with the aim of arousing Dalit consciousness.

== Works ==
Kumar's plays include:

- Daastan
- Bhadra Angulimaal
- Chakradhari
- Sudarshan
- Kapat
- Agayat Etihaas
