= List of Hindi films of 1979 =

A list of films produced by the Bollywood film industry based in Mumbai in 1979.

== Highest-grossing films ==
The ten highest-grossing films at the Indian box office in 1979:

Rank	Title	Gross collection
1	Suhaag	₹10 crore
2	Jaani Dushman	₹9 crore
3	Sargam	₹8 crore
4	Mr. Natwarlal	₹6.5 crore
5	Kaala Patthar	₹6 crore
6	Kartavya	₹5.5 crore
7	Noorie	₹5 crore
8	The Great Gambler	₹4.5 crore
9	Surakshaa	₹3.5 crore
10	Khandaan	₹3.4 crore

== Films ==
Title	Director	Cast	Genre	Sources
Aaj Ki Dhara	Mukul Dutt	Danny Denzongpa, Waheeda Rehman, Rehana Sultan	Drama	
Aakhri Kasam	Dinesh-Ramanesh	Kabir Bedi, Om Shivpuri, Vinod Mehra, Yogeeta Bali	Action	
Aangan Ki Kali	Harsh Kohli	Geeta Khanna, Lakshmi Narayan, Prema Narayan, Rakesh Roshan	Drama	
Aatish	Ambrish Sangal	Mumtaz Begum, Brahm Bhardwaj, Birbal, Leena Das, Jeetendra	Action	
Ahinsa	Chand	Sunil Dutt, Rekha, Ranjeet, Rajendra Nath	Action	
Ahsaas	Surinder Suri	Shashi Kapoor, Simi Garewal, Amjad Khan, Bindu, Simple Kapadia, Shammi Kapoor	Romance	
Amar Deep	R. Krishnamurthy, K. Vijayan	Rajesh Khanna, Vinod Mehra, Shabana Azmi	Romantic, Drama	
Atmaram	Sohanlal Kanwar	Farida Jalal, Bindiya Goswami, Aruna Irani, Amjad Khan, Pran	Family	
Aur Kaun?	Shyam Ramsay, Tulsi Ramsay	Roopesh Kumar, Madan Puri, Sachin, Om Shivpuri	Horror	
Bagula Bhagat	Harmesh Malhotra	Ashok Kumar, Kamini Kaushal, Shatrughan Sinha, Shabana Azmi	Action, Thriller	
Baton Baton Mein	Basu Chatterjee	Amol Palekar, Tina Munim, Asrani, Pearl Padamsee, Tun Tun, Mazhar Khan	Comedy	
Bhayaanak	S. U. Syed	Mithun Chakraborty, Ranjeeta	Horror	
Bin Phere Hum Tere	Rajat Rakshit	Asha Parekh, Rajendra Kumar, Vinod Mehra, Sarika, Nazneen, Kamal Kapoor	Drama	
Bombay by Nite	A. Shamsheer	Ramesh Deo, Prithviraj Kapoor, Sanjeev Kumar	Drama	
Chambal Ki Raani	Radhakant	Mahendra Sandhu, Dara Singh, Urmila Bhatt, Chand Usmani, Amjad Khan	Crime, Action	
Cinema Cinema	Krishna Shah	Amitabh Bachchan, Zeenat Aman, Dharmendra, Hema Malini	Documentary	
Dada	Jugal Kishore	Vinod Mehra, Bindiya Goswami, Jeevan, Amjad Khan	Action, Drama, Family	
Dhongee	Ashok Roy	Randhir Kapoor, Neetu Singh, Rakesh Roshan		
Dil Kaa Heera	Dulal Guha	Dharmendra, Hema Malini, Sachin, Nanditha Bose	Action, Thriller	
Do Ladke Dono Kadke	Basu Chatterjee	Amol Palekar, Asrani, Moushumi Chatterjee	Comedy	
Do Shikaari	Kuljit Pal	Vinod Khanna, Biswajeet, Rekha, Amjad Khan	Action	
Dooriyaan	Bhimsain	Uttam Kumar, Sharmila Tagore, Shreeram Lagoo	Drama	
Duniya Meri Jeb Mein	Tinnu Anand	Shashi Kapoor, Rishi Kapoor, Neetu Singh, Ranjeet	Action	
Ganga Bhavani	T. Prakash Rao	Gummadi	Drama	
Gautam Govinda	Subhash Ghai	Shashi Kapoor, Maushumi Chatterji, Shatrughan Sinha, Vijay Arora, Nirupa Roy		
Ghar Ki Laaj	B. R. Ishara	Sanjeev Kumar, Moushumi Chatterjee	Drama	
Gol Maal	Hrishikesh Mukherjee	Amol Palekar, Bindiya Goswami, Utpal Dutt	Comedy	
Gopal Krishna	Vijay Sharma	Sachin, Zarina Wahab	Romance	
The Great Gambler	Shakti Samanta	Amitabh Bachchan, Zeenat Aman, Neetu Singh, Prem Chopra, Utpal Dutt	Action	
Griha Pravesh	Basu Bhattacharya	Sanjeev Kumar, Sharmila Tagore, Sarika	Romance	
Hamare Tumhare	Umesh Mehra	Sanjeev Kumar, Raakhee Gulzhar, Amjad Khan, Prem Krishen, Anil Kapoor, Lucky Ali, Amrish Puri	Romance	
Har Har Gange	Babubhai Mistri	Ashish Kumar, Anjana Mumtaz, Vikram Gokhale	Fantasy, Drama	
Heera-Moti	Chand	Shatrughan Sinha, Reena Roy, Danny Denzongpa	Action	
Hum Tere Aashiq Hain	Prem Sagar	Jeetendra, Hema Malini, Amjad Khan	Romance	
Ikraar	Kailash Advani	Rakesh Roshan, Talluri Rameshwari		
Jaan-e-Bahaar	Prakash Kapur	Sachin, Sarika	Romance	
Jaandaar	S. K. Luthra	Jeetendra, Vinod Mehra, Bindiya Goswami, Asrani, Aruna Irani	Drama	
Jaani Dushman	Nishi Films	Sunil Dutt, Sanjeev Kumar, Reena Roy, Shatrughan Sinha, Rekha, Vinod Mehra, Jeetendra, Neetu Singh, Bindiya Goswami, Prem Nath	Horror	
Janta Hawaldar	Mehmmod	Rajesh Khanna, Hema Malini, Yogita Bali	Romance	
Jeena Yahan	Basu Chatterjee	Amol Palekar, Shekar Kapur, Shabana Azmi	Romance	
Jhoota Kahin Ka	Ravi Tandon	Rishi Kapoor, Neetu Singh, Rakesh Roshan, Prem Chopra	Romance	
Jurmana	Hirishikesh Mukherjee	Amitabh Bachchan, Rakhee Gulzar, Vinod Mehra	Romance	
Kaala Patthar	Yash Chopra	Amitabh Bachchan, Shashi Kapoor, Raakhee Gulzar, Shatrughan Sinha, Parveen Babi, Neetu Singh, Prem Chopra, Mac Mohan, Iftekhar, Sanjeev Kumar, Poonam Dhillon	Action	
Kartavya	Mohan Sehgal	Dharmendra, Rekha, Vinod Mehra		
Khandan	Anil Ganguly	Jeetendra, Bindiya Goswami, Nirupa Roy	Family, Drama	
Lahu Ke Do Rang	Mahesh Bhatt	Vinod Khanna, Shabana Azmi	Romance	
Lakhan		Navin Nischol, Padma Khanna, Ranjeeta Kaur	Drama	
Lok Parlok	T. Rama Rao	Jeetendra, Jaya Prada, Amjad Khan	Drama	
Love in Canada	S. Ramanathan	Vinod Mehra, Jeetendra, Moushumi Chatterjee	Romance	
Maan Apmaan	N. V. Deshpande	Sanjeev Kumar, Kanan Kaushal	Drama	
Magroor	Brij Sadanah	Shatrughan Sinha, Vidya Sinha	Romance Drama	
Manzil	Basu Chatterjee	Amitabh Bachchan, Moushumi Chatterjee	Drama	
Meera	Gulzar	Shammi Kapoor, Hema Malini, Vinod Khanna, Vidya Sinha	Drama	
Meri Biwi Ki Shaadi	Rajat Rakshit	Amol Palekar, Ranjeeta Kaur	Comedy	
Mr. Natwarlal	Rakesh Kumar	Amitabh Bachchan, Rekha, Amjad Khan, Ajit Khan, Kader Khan	Action, Drama	
Muqabla	Rajkumar Kohli	Sunil Dutt, Rajesh Khanna, Shatrughan Sinha, Reena Roy, Rekha, Bindiya Goswami	Action	
Nagin Aur Suhagin	Shantilal Soni	Vijay Arora, Mahesh Bhatt, Rita Bhaduri	Drama	
Naiyya	Prashanta Nanda	Prashanta Nanda, Zarina Wahab, Baldev Khosa	Drama	
Nauker	Ismail Memon	Sanjeev Kumar, Jaya Badhuri	Comedy	
Noorie	Manmohan Krishna	Farooq Sheikh, Poonam Dhillon	Drama	
Pehredaar	Batra Mohinder	Ranjeet, Danny Denzongpa	Action	
Prem Bandhan	Ramanand Sagar	Rajesh Khanna, Rekha, Moushumi Chatterjee	Romance	
Prem Vivah	Basu Chatterjee	Mithun Chakraborty, Asha Parekh, Bindiya Goswami	Romance	
Raadha Aur Seeta	Vijay Kapoor	Arun Govil, Rita Bhaduri	Romance	
Raakhi Ki Saugandh	Shibu Mitra	Rajan Haskar, Ajit Khan, Vinod Mehra, Sarika	Drama	
Raja Harishchandra	Asish Kumar	Asish Kumar, Lalita Pawar	Mythology	
Ratnadeep	Basu Chatterjee	Dheeraj Kumar, Girish Karnad, Hema Malini, A. K. Hangal	Drama	
Rikki-Tikki-Tavi	Nana Kldashvili, Aleksandr Zguridi	Igor Alekseyev	Children's	
The Great Gambler	Shakti Samant	Amitabh Bachchan, Neetu Singh, Zeenat Aman, Prem Chopra	Thriller	
Saanch Ko Aanch Nahin	Satyen Bose	Arun Govil, Urmila Bhatt, Om Puri	Drama	
Salaam Memsaab	Asrani	Sunil Dutt, Rhishi kapoor, Yogeeta Bali, Zarina Wahab, Asrani	Drama	
Sampark	Inder Sen	Madhu Kapoor, Girish Karnad, Mazar Khan	Drama	
Sargam	K. Vishwanath	Rishi Kapoor, Jaya Prada, Shakti Kapoor	Romance	
Sarkari Mehmaan	N. D. Kothari	Vinod Khanna, Padma Khanna, Amjad Khan	Drama	
Sawan Ko Aane Do	Kanak Mishra	Arun Govil, Zarina Wahab, Rita Bhaduri	Romance	
Shaayad	Madan Bavaria	Naseeruddin Shah, Om Puri, Simi Garewal	Drama	
Shabhash Daddy	Kishore Kumar	Kishore Kumar, Amit Kumar, Yogeeta Bali	Romance	
Shikshaa	S. Ramanathan	Raj Kiran, Sushma Verma, Beena Bannerjee	Drama	
Shodh	Biblap Roy Chowdhary	Om Puri	Horror	
Solva Sawan	Bharathi Raja	Amol Palekar, Sridevi	Romance	
Suhaag	Manmohan Desai	Amitabh Bachchan, Shashi Kapoor, Rekha, Parveen Babi, Nirupa Roy, Amjad Khan, Kader Khan, Ranjeet, Jeevan	Romance	
Sunayana	Hiren Nag	Naseeruddin Shah, Sulochana Latkar	Drama	
Surakksha	Ravikant Nagaich	Mithun Chakraborty, Ranjeeta Kaur	Romance	
Taraana	Deepak Bahry	Mithun Chakraborty, Ranjeeta Kaur	Romance	
Teen Chehre	Y. N. Kapoor	Sujit Kumar, Jayshree T., Pran,	Action	
Tere Pyar Mein	Subhash Sharma	Mithun Chakraborty, Sarika, Vijayendra Ghatge	Musical	
Yuvraaj	T. R. Ramanna	Vinod Khanna, Neetu Singh, Jaya Malini, Aruna Irani	Romance	

== Dubbed films ==
Opening	Title	Director(s)	Original film		Cast	Ref.
Opening	Title	Director(s)	Title	Language	Cast	Ref.
	Mata Velankanni	K. Thangappan	Annai Velankanni	Tamil	Gemini Ganesan Jayalalithaa	

== See also ==
- List of Hindi films of 1978
- List of Hindi films of 1980
