= List of Hindi films of 1982 =

This is a list of films produced by the Bollywood film industry based in Mumbai in 1982:

== Highest-grossing films ==
The ten highest-grossing films of 1982 at the Indian box office were:

Rank	Title	Gross collection
1	Vidhaata	₹16 crore
2	Prem Rog	₹13 crore
3	Namak Halaal	₹12 crore
4	Khud-Daar	₹10 crore
5	Farz Aur Kanoon	₹9.5 crore
6	Nikaah	₹9 crore
7	Satte Pe Satta	₹8.5 crore
8	Shakti	₹8 crore
9	Rajput	₹7.5 crore
10	Desh Premee	₹7.2 crore

== Films ==
Title	Director	Cast	Genre
Aadharshila	Ashok Ahuja	Anita Kanwar, Annu Kapoor, Pankaj Kapur	Drama
Aagaman	Muzaffar Ali	Rani Deepa, Anupam Kher, Suresh Oberoi	Drama
Aamne Samne	Ashim S. Samanta	Mithun Chakraborty, Aarti Geeta, Tarun Ghosh	Action
Angoor	Gulzar	Sanjeev Kumar, Deven Verma, Moushumi Chatterjee	Comedy
Anmol Sitaare	Geeta Priya	Master Baboo, Rakesh Bedi, Ramesh Deo	Drama
Anokha Bandhan	Mehul Kumar	Jeetendra, Navin Nischol, Ashok Kumar, Shabana Azmi, Seema Deo, Aruna Irani	Drama
Aparoopa	Jahnu Barua	Gopi Desai, Jagdeep, Girish Karnad	Drama
Apmaan	Ami Asthana	Ami Asthana, Suresh Chatwal, Manik Irani	Drama
Apna Bana Lo	J. Om Prakash	Jeetendra, Rekha, Shakti Kapoor	Drama, Family
Apradhi Kaun?	Mohan Bhakri	Javed Khan, Rajni Sharma, Arpana Choudhary	Thriller
Arth	Mahesh Bhatt	Raj Kiran, Shabana Azmi, Smita Patil	Drama
Ashanti	Umesh Mehra	Rajesh Khanna, Mithun Chakraborty, Zeenat Aman, Parveen Babi, Shabana Azmi	Action, Adventure, Crime
Ayaash	Shakti Samanta	Sanjeev Kumar, Rati Agnihotri, Arun Govil	Romance
Baawri	A. C. Tirulokchandar	Rakesh Roshan, Jaya Prada, Yogeeta Bali, Shreeram Lagoo, Asrani	Family
Bachche Teen Aur Daku Chhe	Govind Saraiya	Farita Boyce, Geetanjali	
Badle Ki Aag	Raj Kumar Kohli	Sunil Dutt, Dharmendra, Jeetendra, Reena Roy, Smita Patel, Sarika	Action
Baghavat	Ramanand Sagar	Dharmendra, Hema Malini, Reena Roy	Action, Romance
Barrister	Salil M. Ghosh	Arun Govil, Vinod Mehra, Sulakshana Pandit	Drama
Bazaar	Sagar Sarhadi	Farooq Sheikh, Smita Patil, Naseeruddin Shah	Drama, Family
Bemisal	Hrishikesh Mukherjee	Amitabh Bachchan, Rakhee Gulzar, Vinod Mehra	Drama, Family
Bezubaan	Bapu	Shashi Kapoor, Reena Roy, Raj Kiran	Drama, Romance
Badshah		Irfan Malik, Nadeem Aldah, Falaknaaz Khan, Sromona	
Bhai Aakhir Bhai Hota Hai	R.C Nanda	Kumari Naaz, Monty Nath	
Bheegi Palkein	Sisir Misra	Raj Babbar, Smita Patil, Dina Pathak	Romance
Chalti Ka Naam Zindagi	Kishore Kumar	Kishore Kumar, Rita Bhaduri, Master Bhagwan, Harindranath Chattopadhyay	
Chambal Ke Daku	S. Azhar	Javed Khan, Nazneen	Action
Chorni	Jyoti Sarup	Jeetendra, Neetu Singh, Shriram Lagoo	Family
Dard Ka Rishta	Sunil Dutt	Sunil Dutt, Reena Roy, Smita Patil	Drama
Daulat	Mohan Segal	Vinod Khanna, Zeenat Aman, Amjad Khan	Action, Crime, Drama, Family
Davedar	Dulal Guha	Dharmendra, Uttam Kumar, Urmila Bhaat, Maushumi Chatterji	
Deedar-E-Yaar	Harnam Singh Rawail	Jeetendra, Rekha, Rishi Kapoor, Tina Munim, Reena Roy	Drama, Romance
Desh Premee	Manmohan Desai	Amitabh Bachchan, Sharmila Tagore, Hema Malini, Parveen Babi, Amjad Khan, Kader Khan, Shammi Kapoor, Jeevan	Action, Drama
Dharam Kanta	Sultan Ahmed	Raaj Kumar, Rajesh Khanna, Jeetendra, Waheeda Rehman, Reena Roy, Sulakshana Pandit	Action, Drama, Family
Dial 100	S. Ramanathan	Ashok Kumar, Vinod Mehra, Bindiya Goswami, Helen	
Dil Hi Dil Mein	Desh Gautam	Manju Bhatia, Dhumal, Iftekhar	Romance
Dil-e-Nadaan	C. V. Sridhar	Rajesh Khanna, Jaya Prada, Shatrughan Sinha, Smita Patil	Drama, Romance
Dil... Akhir Dil Hai	Esmayeel Shroff	Rakhee Gulzar, Parveen Babi, Naseeruddin Shah	Drama
Disco Dancer	Babbar Subhash	Mithun Chakraborty, Kim Yashpal	Musical, Drama
Do Dishayen	Dulal Guha	Dharmendra, Hema Malini	Romance, Drama
Do Guru	Ravi Tandon	Shashi Kapoor, Padma Khanna, Neetu Singh	Action
Do Ustad	S. D. Narang	Shatrughan Sinha, Reena Roy, Danny Denzongpa	
Dulha Bikta Hai	Anwar Pasha	Raj Babbar, Anita Raj, Simple Kapadia	Family, Drama
Farz Aur Kanoon	K. Raghavendra Rao	Jeetendra, Hema Malini, Rati Agnihotri, Raj Kiran	Action
Ghazab	Dixit	Seema Deo, Dharmendra, Krishan Dhawan, Rekha	Drama, Family
Gopichand Jasoos	Naresh Kumar	Raj Kapoor, Zeenat Aman, I. S. Johar	Comedy
Gumsum	Dayanand	Arun Govil, Madhu Kapoor, Shakti Kapoor	Drama
Haathkadi	Surendra Mohan	Sanjeev Kumar, Reena Roy, Shatrughan Sinha	Family, Thriller, Drama
Hamari Bahu Alka	Basu Chatterjee	Rakesh Roshan, Bindiya Goswami, Utpal Dutt	Drama
Hearbeat	Biplab Roy Chowdhury	Utpal Dutt, Anita Kanwar, Amol Palekar	Drama
Heeron Ka Chor	S. K. Kapoor	Mithun Chakraborty, Bindiya Goswami, Ashok Kumar	Action
Insaan	Narendra Bedi	Jeetendra, Vinod Khanna, Reena Roy	Drama, Family
Jaanwar	S. Ali Raza	Rajesh Khanna, Zeenat Aman, Pradeep Kumar, Pran	Action, Drama
Jawalaa Dahej Ki	Chaman Nillay	Shoma Anand, Arun Govil, Sonia Sahni	
Jeeo Aur Jeene Do	Shyam Ralhan	Jeetendra, Reena Roy, Danny Denzongpa, Pran	Action
Jeevan Dhaara	T. Rama Rao	Rekha, Raj Babbar, Amol Palekar, Simple Kapadia	Drama
Jivan Rahasya	Bhimsain		Animation
Johny I Love You	Rakesh Kumar	Sanjay Dutt, Rati Agnihotri, Suresh Oberoi	Action, Romance
Kaamchor	K. Vishwanath	Rakesh Roshan, Jaya Prada, Tanuja	Drama, Family
Kanchan Aur Ganga	Mehul Kumar	Kiran Kumar	
Kanya Dweep	Ramanna	Jayshree T.	Musical
Karwat	Anil Ganguly	Mithun Chakraborty, Rakesh Roshan, Bindiya Goswami	Drama
Kasam Durga Ki	Joginder Shelly	Vijay Arora, Padma Khanna, Raza Murad, Rajni Sharma	
Khud-Daar	Ravi Tandon	Sanjeev Kumar, Amitabh Bachchan, Vinod Mehra, Parveen Babi, Bindiya Goswami, Prem Chopra, Mehmood Ali, Tanuja	Drama
Khush Naseeb	Vijay Deep	Padmini Kolhapure, Vinod Mehra	Action, Crime
Lakshmi	B. S. Thapa	Reena Roy, Raj Babbar, Ranjeet	Drama
Lubna	Kabeer Rauthar	Prema Narayan, Kanwaljit Singh	
Main Intequam Loonga	T. Rama Rao	Dharmendra, Reena Roy, Shriram Lagoo	Sports
Maine Jeena Seekh Liya	Bhisham Kohli	Mohammad Asif, Rajni Bala, Geeta Behl	Drama, Romance
Mangal Pandey	Harmesh Malhotra	Shatrughan Sinha, Parveen Babi	Action
Maut Ka Saya	Tulsi Ramsay	Geeta Behl, Anil Dhawan, Vijayendra Ghatge	Drama
Meharbaani	Ajit Singh Deol, A. Nairang	Mahendra Sandhu, Sarika, Narendra Nath	
Mehndi Rang Layegi	Narayana Rao Dasari	Jeetendra, Rekha, Anita Raj	Drama, Family
Nadiya Ke Paar	Govind Moonis	Inder Thakur, Mitali, Savita Bajaj	Drama, Family
Namak Halaal	Prakash Mehra	Amitabh Bachchan, Shashi Kapoor, Waheeda Rehman, Smita Patil, Parveen Babi, Ranjeet, Om Prakash	Drama
Namkeen	Gulzar	Sanjeev Kumar, Sharmila Tagore, Waheeda Rehman, Shabana Azmi	Drama
Naya Safar		Javed Khan, Aarti Gupta, Kamini Kaushal	Romance
Nikaah	B. R. Chopra	Raj Babbar, Salma Agha	Romance
Partner	Anil Tejani	Deepti Naval, Pran, Shakti Kapoor	
Prem Rog	Raj Kapoor	Rishi Kapoor, Padmini Kolhapure, Shammi Kapoor, Nanda, Tanuja, Sushma Seth, Kulbhushan Kharbanda, Raza Murad, Om Prakash	Drama, Romance, Musical, Social
Pyaar Ke Rahi	Atma Ram	Padmini Kapila, Jyoti Sarup, Kanwaljit Singh	
Pyaar Mein Sauda Nahin	Santosh Saroj	Rakesh Bedi, Raj Kiran, Sarika, Sharat Saxena	
Pyaas	O. P. Ralhan	Zeenat Aman	
Pyara Tarana	K. Balachander	Asrani, Kamal Haasan, Shafi Inamdar	
Raakh Aur Chingari	S. U. Syed	Vinod Mehra, Anil Dhawan, Mehandra Shandu, Vidya Sinha, Laxmi Chahya	
Raaste Pyar Ke	V.B. Rajendra Prasad	Jeetendra, Rekha, Shabana Azmi	Drama, Family
Raaj Mahal	K. Parvez	Asrani, Neetu Singh, Vinod Khanna	Drama
Rajput	Vijay Anand	Rajesh Khanna, Dharmendra, Vinod Khanna, Hema Malini, Tina Munim	Action, Crime, Romance
Raksha	Ravikant Nagaich	Jeetendra, Parveen Babi	Action
Ramnagari	Kantilal Rathod	Sulabha Deshpande, Suhasini Mulay, Ram Nagarkar	Drama
Rustom	Dara Singh	Dara Singh, Tanuja, Sohrab Modi	
Saath Saath	Raman Kumar	Rakesh Bedi, Sudha Chopra, Avtar Gill	Drama
Samraat	Mohan Segal	Dharmendra, Jeetendra, Hema Malini	Action, Thriller
Sanam Teri Kasam	Narendra Bedi	Reena Roy, Kamal Haasan, Jagdeep	Drama, Family, Crime, Romance, Comedy
Sant Gyaneshwar		Kanan Kaushal, Mahesh Kothare, Dev Kumar	
Sati Aur Bhagwan	Shantilal Soni	Vijay Arora, Rita Bhaduri	Drama
Satte Pe Satta	Raj Sippy	Amitabh Bachchan, Hema Malini, Ranjeeta Kaur, Amjad Khan, Shakti Kapoor, Sachin, Mac Mohan	Comedy
Saugandh	Ravikant Nagaich	Anand Balraj, Tanuja, Aruna Irani, Gulshan Grover	Crime, Drama, Romance
Sawaal	Ramesh Talwar	Shashi Kapoor, Sanjeev Kumar, Waheeda Rehman, Randhir Kapoor, Poonam Dhillon	Drama, Family
Shadi Shadi	Bhimsain		Animation
Shakti	Ramesh Sippy	Dilip Kumar, Amitabh Bachchan, Raakhee, Smita Patil, Kulbhushan Kharbanda, Amrish Puri, Anil Kapoor	Drama
Shaukeen	Basu Chatterjee	Ashok Kumar, A. K. Hangal, Utpal Dutt, Mithun Chakraborty, Rati Agnihotri	Comedy
Shiv Charan	Anil Kumar	Chandana Choudhary, Jankidas, Vinod Mehra	
Shriman Shrimati	Vijaya Reddy	Sanjeev Kumar, Rakhee Gulzar, Rakesh Roshan	Comedy, Drama, Family
Sindoor Bane Jwala	K. Bapaiah	Sanjeev Kumar, Sharada	
Situm	Arunavikas, Arunavikas	Naseeruddin Shah, Smita Patil, Vikram	Drama, Family
Star	Vinod Pande	Kumar Gaurav, Rati Agnihotri, Padmini Kolhapure	Romance
Sultana Daku	Mohammed Hussain	Dara Singh, Ajit Khan, Helen	Action
Sumbandh	Shibu Mittra	Ashok Kumar, Vinod Mehra, Rati Agnihotri	Action, Drama, Thriller, Romance
Sun Sajna	Chander Bahl	Mithun Chakraborty, Ranjeeta Kaur, Iftekhar	Drama, Family, Romance
Suraag	Jagmohan Mundhra, Ambrish Sangal	Sanjeev Kumar, Shabana Azmi, Rajesh Khanna	Thriller, Mystery
Swami Dada	Dev Anand	Dev Anand, Mithun Chakraborty, Rati Agnihotri	Action, Drama, Family
Taaqat	Narendra Bedi	Vinod Khanna, Parveen Babi, Rakhee Gulzar, Pran	
Taqdeer Ka Badshah	Babbar Subhash	Mithun Chakraborty, Ranjeeta Kaur, Amjad Khan, Pran	Action
Teesri Aankh	Subodh Mukerji	Dharmendra, Shatrughan Sinha, Zeenat Aman	Action, Thriller
Teri Kasam	A. C. Tirulokchandar	Kumar Gaurav, Poonam Dhillon	Romance
Teri Maang Sitaron Se Bhar Doon	Raj Khosla	Nutan, Padmini Kolhapure, Raj Kiran	Family
Thirst	O. P. Ralhan	Dheeraj Kumar, Tanuja, Zeenat Aman, Anju Mahendru, Madan Puri	
Tumhare Bina	Satyen Bose	Suresh Oberoi, Swaroop Sampat, Master Ravi	Drama, Family
Umbartha	Jabbar Patel	Smita Patil, Girish Karnad, Shrikant Moghe	Drama
Ustadi Ustad Se	Deepak Bahry	Mumtaz Begum, Master Bhagwan, Master Bittoo	Action, Crime, Drama, Romance
Vakil Babu	Asit Sen	Zeenat Aman, Raj Kapoor, Shashi Kapoor	
Vidhaata	Subhash Ghai	Dilip Kumar, Sanjay Dutt, Shammi Kapoor, Sanjeev Kumar, Padmini Kolapurhe, Sarika	Drama
Vijeta	Govind Nihalani	Shashi Kapoor, Rekha, Supriya Pathak	Drama
Waqt Ke Shehzade	Kukoo Kapoor	Dheeraj Kumar, Deepak Parashar, Parikhsat Sahni, Rati Agnihotri, Aruna Irani, Kalpana Iyer	Musical
Waqt-Waqt Ki Baat	Santosh Saroj	Rameshwari, Rakesh Roshan	
Yeh Nazdeekiyan	Vinod Pande	Marc Zuber, Shabana Azmi, Parveen Babi	Drama, Romance
Yeh To Kamaal Ho Gaya	T. Rama Rao	Vijay Arora, Kumud Bole, Suresh Chatwal	Action, Comedy, Drama
Yeh Vaada Raha	Kapil Kapoor	Rishi Kapoor, Poonam Dhillon, Tina Munim, Raakhee Gulzhar, Shammi Kapoor	Musical, Drama, Romance
Zakhmee Insaan	Deepak Balraj Vij	Javed Khan, Rita Baduri, Sakthi Kapoor, Aruna Irani	

== See also ==
- List of Hindi films of 1981
- List of Hindi films of 1983
