= 27th Filmfare Awards =

1980 awards for Hindi cinema

- Date: 1980
- Site: Bombay

Highlights
- Best Film: Junoon
- Best Actor: Amol Palekar for Gol Maal
- Best Actress: Jaya Bachchan for Nauker
- Most awards: Junoon (6)
- Most nominations: Junoon (9)

The 27th Filmfare Awards for Hindi cinema were held in Bombay in 1980.

Junoon led the ceremony with 9 nominations, followed by Gol Maal and Kaala Patthar with 8 nominations each, and Sargam with 7 nominations.

Junoon won 6 awards, including Best Film and Best Director (for Shyam Benegal), thus becoming the most-awarded film at the ceremony.

Hrishikesh Mukherjee received dual nominations for Best Director for his direction in Gol Maal and Jurmana, but lost to Shyam Benegal who won the award for Junoon.

Amitabh Bachchan also received dual nominations for Best Actor for his performances in Kaala Patthar and Mr. Natwarlal, but lost to Amol Palekar who won the award for Gol Maal.

== Main awards ==
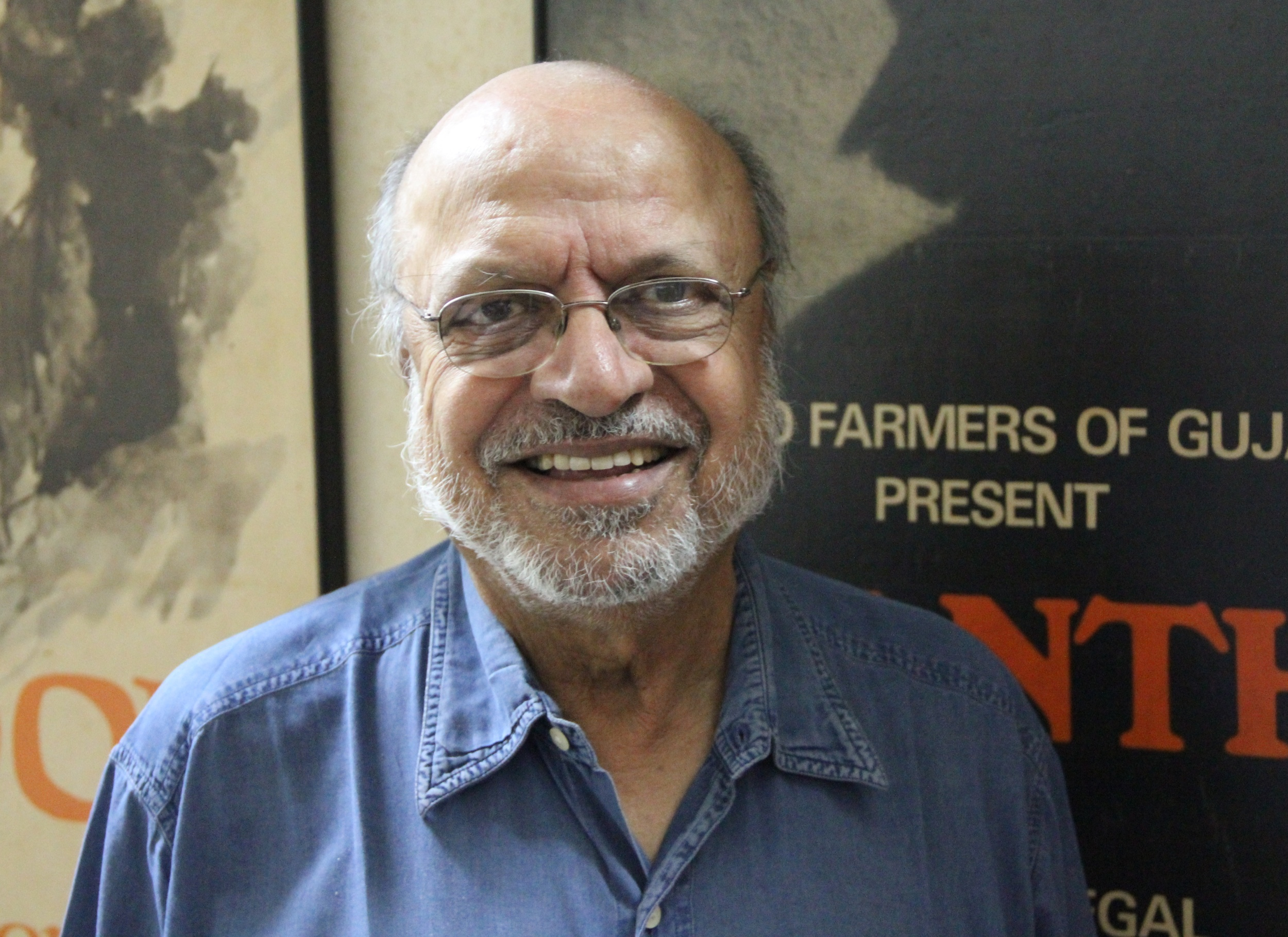
Shyam Benegal — Best Director winner for Junoon

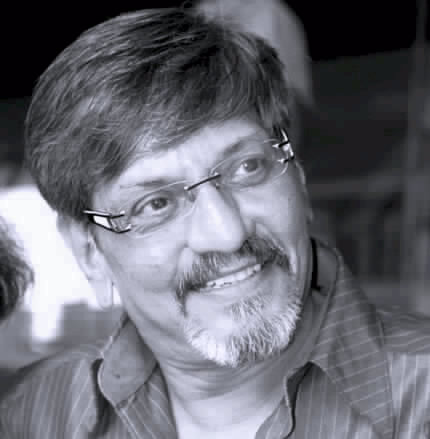
Amol Palekar — Best Actor winner for Gol Maal

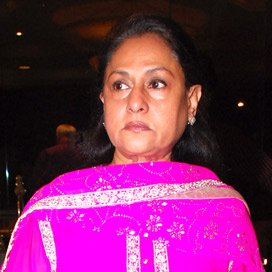
Jaya Bachchan — Best Actress winner for Nauker

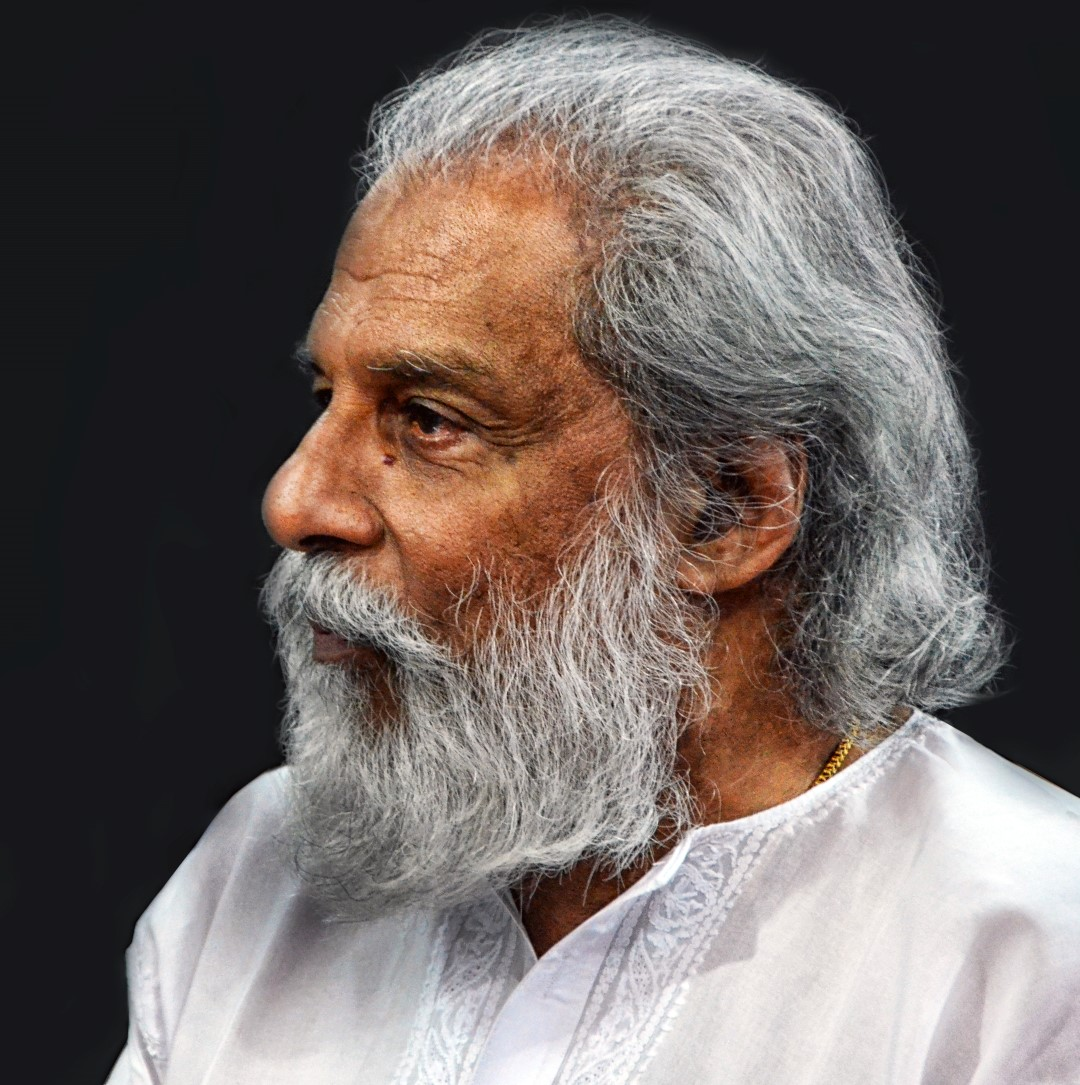
K. J. Yesudas — Best Playback singer, Male winner for "Dil Ke Tuke Tukde" (Dada)

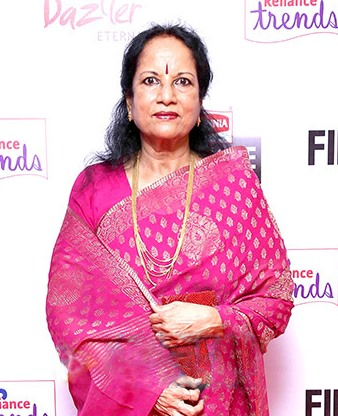
Vani Jairam — Best Playback singer, Female winner for "Mere Toh Giridhar Gopal" (Meera)

=== Best Film ===
Junoon

- Amar Deep
- Kaala Patthar
- Noorie
- Sargam

=== Best Director ===
Shyam Benegal – Junoon

- Hrishikesh Mukherjee – Gol Maal
- Hrishikesh Mukherjee – Jurmana
- Manmohan Krishna – Noorie
- Yash Chopra – Kaala Patthar

=== Best Actor ===
Amol Palekar – Gol Maal

- Amitabh Bachchan – Kaala Patthar
- Amitabh Bachchan – Mr. Natwarlal
- Rajesh Khanna – Amar Deep
- Rishi Kapoor – Sargam

=== Best Actress ===
Jaya Bachchan – Nauker

- Hema Malini – Meera
- Jaya Prada – Sargam
- Poonam Dhillon – Noorie
- Raakhee – Jurmana

=== Best Supporting Actor ===
Amjad Khan – Dada

- Naseeruddin Shah – Junoon
- Shatrughan Sinha – Kaala Patthar
- Utpal Dutt – Gol Maal
- Vinod Mehra – Amar Deep

=== Best Supporting Actress ===
Helen – Lahu Ke Do Rang

- Dina Pathak – Gol Maal
- Farida Jalal – Jurmana
- Jennifer Kendal – Junoon
- Neetu Singh – Kaala Patthar

=== Best Comic Actor ===
Utpal Dutt – Gol Maal

- Asrani – Sargam
- Deven Verma – Gol Maal
- Deven Verma – Lok Parlok
- Mehmood – Nauker

=== Best Story ===
Dooriyaan – Shankar Shesh

- Gol Maal – Sailesh Dey
- Junoon – Ruskin Bond
- Kaala Patthar – Salim–Javed
- Sargam – K. Vishwanathan

=== Best Screenplay ===
Godhuli – Girish Karnad and B. V. Karanth

=== Best Dialogue ===
Junoon – Satyadev Dubey

=== Best Music Director ===
Sargam – Laxmikant–Pyarelal

- Jaani Dushman – Laxmikant–Pyarelal
- Kaala Patthar – Rajesh Roshan
- Mr. Natwarlal – Rajesh Roshan
- Noorie – Khayyam

=== Best Lyricist ===
Gol Maal – Gulzar for Aane Wala Pal

- Dada – Sahir Ludhianvi for Dil Ke Tukde Tukde
- Jurmana – Anand Bakshi for Saawan Ke Jhule Pade
- Noorie – Jan Nisar Akhtar for Aaja Re
- Sargam – Anand Bakshi for Dufliwale

=== Best Playback Singer, Male ===
Dada – K. J. Yesudas for Dil Ke Tukde Tukde

- Jaani Dushman – Mohammed Rafi for Chalo Re Doli Uthao
- Kaala Patthar – Kishore Kumar for Ek Rasta Hai Zindagi
- Mr. Natwarlal – Amitabh Bachchan for Mere Paas Aao
- Noorie – Nitin Mukesh for Aaja Re
- Sunayana – K. J. Yesudas for Sunayana In Nazaron Ko

=== Best Playback Singer, Female ===
Meera – Vani Jairam for Mere To Giridhar Gopal

- Gaman – Chhaya Ganguly for Aap Ki Yaad
- Ikraar – Usha Mangeshkar for Hum Se Nazar To Milao
- Meera – Vani Jairam for Aeri Main To Prem Diwani
- Sunayana – Hemlata for Megha O Megha

=== Best Art Direction ===
Lahu Ke Do Rang – Madhukar Shinde

=== Best Cinematography ===
Junoon – Govind Nihalani

=== Best Editing ===
Junoon – Diwakar Bhanudas

=== Best Sound ===
Junoon – Hitendra Ghosh

== Critics' awards ==
=== Best Film ===
Jeena Yahan

== Biggest winners ==
- Junoon – 6/9
- Gol Maal – 3/8
- Lahu Ke Do Rang – 2/2
- Dada – 2/3
- Sargam – 1/7
- Kaala Patthar – 0/8

== See also ==
- 29th Filmfare Awards
- 28th Filmfare Awards
- Filmfare Awards
