= Lahu Ke Do Rang =

Lahu Ke Do Rang (lit. 'Two Colours of Blood') may refer to:

- Lahu Ke Do Rang (1979 film), an Indian Hindi-language film by Mahesh Bhatt
- Lahu Ke Do Rang (1997 film), an Indian Hindi-language film by Mehul Kumar
