= Hum Tum Ek Kamre Mein Band Ho =

Song by Lata Mangeshkar and Shailendra Singh

from the album Bobby
- Language: Hindi
- Released: 1973
- Composer: Laxmikant Pyarelal
- Lyricist: Anand Bakshi

"Hum Tum Ek Kamre Mein Band Ho" (transl. Suppose you and I, locked in a room) is an Indian Hindi song from 1973 Hindi film Bobby, directed by Raj Kapoor. The song features Rishi Kapoor and Dimple Kapadia. The lyrics of the song was written by Anand Bakshi, and the music was composed by Lakshmikant-Pyarelal. Lata Mangeshkar and Shailendra Singh were the playback singers.

== Song ==
"Hum Tum Ek Kamre Mein Band Ho"
sample from Hum Tum Ek Kamre Mein Band Ho

It was filmed at Kapoor family's bungalow inside their farm house Rajbaugh, which is now a memorial to Raj Kapoor and lies inside the MIT World Peace University (MIT WPU) on the banks of Mula-Mutha River in Loni Kalbhor village 30 km east of Pune in Maharashtra.

== Reception ==
According to Binaca Geetmala, a weekly countdown show, "Hum Tum Ek Kamre Mein Band Ho" was the second most popular song of the year 1973, after "Yaari Hai Imaan Mera Yaar Meri Zindagi" from the film Zanjeer.

== Trivia ==
The 2004 Hindi film Hum Tum got its title from this song.
