= Mehndi (1983 film) =

Mehndi (1983 Movie)
- Directed by: Asit Sen
- Written by: V.K. Sharma (Dialogue Writer)
- Screenplay by: Gulshan Nanda
- Story by: Gulshan Nanda
- Produced by: Dinesh Kumar
- Starring: Vinod Mehra; Raj Babbar
- Cinematography: D.K. PRABHAKAR
- Music by: Mohammed Zahur Khayyam
- Release date: 1983
- Country: India
- Language: Hindi

Mehndi is a 1983 Bollywood drama film, directed by Asit Sen. It stars Vinod Mehra, Bindiya, Raj Babbar. The dialogue was written by V.K. Sharma.

== Plot ==
Mehndi follows Ajit Singh, an Indian Army official. At the beginning of the movie, Ajit injures himself in battle. While healing at the army tents, he falls in love with Gauri, a nurse. Once Ajit recovers, he and Gauri decide to marry after Ajit's next mission. However, when he returns, he finds both that Gauri has been molested and murdered, and that his best friend has gone missing in war, and has been presumed dead. Ajit, heartbroken, decides to marry another woman, Madhuri. Later on, it is revealed that Ajit's best friend who had gone missing is alive, and that he had used to be Madhuri's lover.

== Cast ==
- Raj Babbar as Ajit Singh|
- Vinod Mehra as Gautam
- Ranjeeta Kaur as Madhuri ' Madhu
- Raj Bothra as Dr Rajan
- Usha Kiran as Gautam,s mom
- Birbal as Langotiprasad
- Meena T as Maya
- Shakti Kapoor as Shakti R Singh
- Bindiya Goswami as Gauri
- Madan Puri as Pukhraj, Madhuri,s dad
- Mohan Choti as Ramesh, Shakti,s friend
- Seema Deo as Lisa

== Soundtrack ==
The music of the film was composed by Khayyam, while the lyrics were written by Verma Malik.

1. "Pichhli Yaad Bhula Do" - Kishore Kumar
