= Sansani: The Sensation =

1981 Hindi horror mystery film

- Directed by: Irshad
- Produced by: Kavita Seth
- Release date: 1981

Sansani: The Sensation is a 1981 Hindi horror mystery film of Bollywood directed by Irshad and produced by Kavita Seth. This film was released under the banner of Panorama Pictures. Lead singers of the film are Asha Bhosle, Amit Kumar, Bhupinder Singh and Varsha Bhosle with the songs composed by Hemant Bhosle.

== Plot ==
Two people, Ajay and Prem, come to a remote village. They go for a night stay to a nearby guest house from the railway station in the foggy night. Surprisingly, a series of murders happens immediately after their arrival and at the same time, every night a sari-clad lady roams in the area of the burial ground. The police suspect Ajay and arrest him for the charge of the murders, but he escapes from police custody to solve the murder mystery.

== Cast ==
- Vinod Mehra as Ajay Sachdev
- Bindiya Goswami as Nisha
- Prem Chopra as Prem Kumar
- Shreeram Lagoo as Kumar Rajdev
- Jagdeep as Dhanekapuri
- Jayshree Gadkar as Kamla Devi
- Gulshan Grover as Tribal Man
- Keshto Mukherjee as Juman
- Dina Pathak as Wilma
- Jagdish Raj as Mathur
- Viju Khote as Tribal Leader
- Shailendra Singh as Tony
- T. P. Jain as Amarnath
- Kavita as Dr. Mounika
- Jayashree T as Athanni Jaan
- Meena T as Chawani Jaan
- Raj Kishore as Tangewala
- Amol Sen as Ticket collector
- Dattatray Ramachandra Bhat as Father Peter

== Soundtrack ==
- Phir Teri yaad aa gayi (Asha Bhosle)
- Ab Kahan jaayenge hum (Asha Bhosle, Amit Kumar)
- Saquia tu koi (Asha Bhosle & Varsha Bhosle), Lyrics: Irshad
- Patthar ka hai sanam (Amit Kumar, Asha Bhosle, Bhupinder Singh, Varsha Bhosle)

== Trivia ==
- This is the only film in which Asha Bhosle, her son Hemant Bhosale and daughter Varsha Bhosle together have given playback. Hemant Bhosale also being the music director.
