= Aahat =

Aahat may refer to:

- Aahat (Pakistani film), 1982
- Aahat (Pakistani TV series), 1991
- Aahat (Indian TV series), 1995
- Aahat – Ek Ajib Kahani, 2010 Indian film
