= Bobby (1973 film) =

1973 film directed by Raj Kapoor

- Theatrical release poster
- Directed by: Raj Kapoor
- Written by: Jainendra Jain (dialogue)
- Screenplay by: Khwaja Ahmad Abbas; V. P. Sathe
- Story by: Khwaja Ahmad Abbas
- Produced by: Raj Kapoor
- Starring: Rishi Kapoor; Dimple Kapadia; Prem Nath; Pran; Aruna Irani; Prem Chopra
- Cinematography: Radhu Karmakar
- Edited by: Raj Kapoor
- Music by: Laxmikant–Pyarelal
- Production company: R.K. Films
- Distributed by: R.K. Films
- Release date: 28 September 1973
- Running time: 169 minutes
- Country: India
- Language: Hindi
- Box office: est. ₹31 crore

Bobby is a 1973 Indian Hindi-language musical romance film, produced and directed by Raj Kapoor, and written by Khwaja Ahmad Abbas. The film stars Raj Kapoor's son, Rishi Kapoor, in his first leading role, opposite Dimple Kapadia in her debut role. The film became a blockbuster securing the position of highest grossing Indian film of 1973, the second highest grossing film of the 1970s at the Indian box office, and one of the top 20 highest-grossing Indian films of all time (when adjusted for inflation). It also became an overseas blockbuster in the Soviet Union, where it drew an audience of 62.6 million viewers, making it one of the top 20 biggest box office hits of all time in the Soviet Union.

Thematically and stylistically inspired by the Archie comics Raj Kapoor was fond of, the film became a trend-setter. It was wildly popular and widely imitated. It introduced to Bollywood the genre of teenage romance with a rich-versus-poor clash as a backdrop. Numerous films in the following years and decades were inspired by this plot. Indiatimes Movies ranks Bobby amongst the 'Top 30 Must See Bollywood Films'. The film was remade in Persian as Parvaz dar Ghafas in 1980. Bobby was Dimple Kapadia's first and only film of the 70s era. As she left the film industry following her early marriage, before returning back to proper movies in the mid-80s till the present date.

== Plot ==
The story is about the love between two Bombay teenagers of different classes and religions—Raja 'Raj' Nath (Rishi Kapoor), the son of a rich Hindu businessman Ram Nath (Pran), and Bobby Braganza (Dimple Kapadia), the daughter of a poor Goan Christian fisherman Jack Braganza (Prem Nath).

Raj returns from his boarding school and upon his return, his parents throw a party to celebrate his birthday. Raj's former governess Mrs. Braganza (Durga Khote) comes by with her granddaughter Bobby to give him a present, but Raj's mother Sushma Nath (Sonia Sahni) ignores Mrs. Braganza, which leads her to leave the party with Bobby in a rush.

Raj opens his gifts the next day and finds Mrs. Braganza's gift, so he decides to meet her in person. Reaching there, Bobby opens the door for him, and it is love at first sight for him. During that visit, he mixes his book with Bobby's, so he goes to meet her at the library to exchange the books, and from there starts their friendship. Raj and Bobby decide to go to see a movie, but find out it is a full house. Then Raj gets an idea to go to a party. At the party, Bobby sees Raj talking to Sushma's dance partner Nima (Aruna Irani) privately and thinks he is in love with her, so she breaks off her relationship before running off to Kashmir. However, Raj comes by to Kashmir and clears up the misunderstanding, prompting Bobby to resume her relationship with him. Despite Jack and Mrs. Braganza being very supportive of Raj and Bobby's relationship due to Raj's friendly nature, Raj learns that the matter is not taken kindly by Ram, who abhors the idea of his son falling in love with the daughter of a poor fisherman. Upon Raj's insistence, Ram invites Jack over to initiate talks of Raj and Bobby's relationship. But instead, a feud ignites when Ram insults Jack and accuses him of using Bobby's beauty and charm to trap Raj for his money; he even offered Jack a bribe of cash to stop Bobby from seeing Raj. Jack gets offended by this accusation and retaliates by insulting Ram before leaving in a huff with Bobby, forbidding her to hang out with Raj again. To ensure Bobby's distance from Raj, Jack sends her and Mrs. Braganza to live in Goa.

Raj gets angry at Ram for driving Bobby away; this was further intensified when he learns that Ram intends to have him marry a mentally-challenged wealthy girl named Alka 'Nikki' Sharma (Farida Jalal) to establish business ties with her rich father Mr. Sharma (Pinchoo Kapoor) without even consulting Raj; Sushma and Nima are not supportive of the idea as well. On the advice from Nima (who sympathizes with Raj on the issue), Raj cuts off all ties to his father and drives off to Goa to reunite with Bobby, who runs away with him. As Sushma blames Ram for driving Raj away, the latter advertises a reward of Rs. 25,000 for anyone who can help find Raj. Upon spotting Raj and Bobby while seeing the reward on a local newspaper, a local greedy goon named Prem Chopra (Prem Chopra) decides that he wants the money so he and his goons kidnap Raj and Bobby. When the teens try to escape, Prem starts beating up Raj while having his goons to restrain Bobby. Eventually, Jack comes to the rescue by attacking Prem, who orders his goons to beat up Jack in retaliation. However, this was witnessed by an arriving Ram and the police, who furiously beat up and arrest Prem and his goons while Raj and Bobby escape. Deciding that they don't want their fathers to interfere in their relationship anymore, Raj and Bobby attempted to commit suicide by jumping over a waterfall after chewing out Ram for antagonizing Jack and starting the feud in the first place. However, a horrified Ram and Jack dive in and rescue both teens from being drowned.

Having realized the folly of the feud that almost drove both teens to death, a remorseful Ram and Jack agreed to end the feud by giving their blessings to Raj and Bobby's relationship, promising never to interfere with it again. With their relationships reconciled, the teens and their fathers happily head back home to their families.

== Cast ==
- Rishi Kapoor as Raj 'Raja' Nath
- Dimple Kapadia as Bobby Braganza
- Prem Nath as Jack Braganza
- Pran as Ram Nath
- Prem Chopra as Prem Chopra
- Sonia Sahni as Sushma Nath
- Durga Khote as Mrs. Braganza
- Aruna Irani as Nima
- Farida Jalal as Alka 'Nikki' Sharma
- Pinchoo Kapoor as Mr. Sharma
- Jagdish Raj as Police Inspector
- Raj Rani as Mrs. Sharma
- Shashi Kiran as Shyam, Raj's college-mate
- Piloo J. Wadia as Mrs. Pestonji

== Production ==
Raj Kapoor launched his second son Rishi Kapoor in this film and wanted a new heroine as his romantic lead in this young love story. Dimple Kapadia and Neetu Singh were auditioned for the role of Bobby Braganza, and Dimple was selected.

In an interview in 2012, Rishi Kapoor stated, "There was a misconception that the film was made to launch me as an actor. The film was made to pay the debts of Mera Naam Joker. Dad wanted to make a love story but he did not have money to cast a superstar like Rajesh Khanna in the film".

=== Filming ===
Some scenes were shot in Gulmarg. One scene was shot in a hut in Gulmarg, which became famous as the 'Bobby Hut'. A few scenes towards the end of the movie were shot on Pune-Solapur highway near Loni Kalbhor where Raj Kapoor owned a farm.

== Soundtrack ==
The film's music was composed by the Laxmikant-Pyarelal duo. The lyrics were written by Anand Bakshi, Rajkavi Inderjeet Singh Tulsi, and Vithalbhai Patel.

Vocals for Kapoor were performed by Shailendra Singh.

Song	Singer(s)	Lyrics	Notes	Raga
Main Shayar To Nahin	Shailendra Singh	Anand Bakshi	Picturized on Rishi Kapoor. The song was reused and picturised on him in the 2004 film Hum Tum.	
Ankhiyon Ko Rahne De	Lata Mangeshkar	Anand Bakshi	Based on the song "Ankhiyan nu rehen de" by Reshma	
Beshak Mandir Masjid	Narendra Chanchal	Rajkavi Inderjeet Singh Tulsi		Bhairavi
Hum Tum Ek Kamre Mein Band Ho	Lata Mangeshkar and Shailendra Singh	Anand Bakshi	Shot at Kapoor family's bungalow in Rajbaugh, now a memorial to Raj Kapoor inside the MIT World Peace University (MIT WPU) on the banks of Mula-Mutha River in Loni Kalbhor village 30 km east of Pune in Maharashtra.	
Jhoot Bole Kauva Kate	Lata Mangeshkar and Shailendra Singh	Vithalbhai Patel	Picturized on Rishi Kapoor and Dimple Kapadia in a village dance setting	
Mujhe Kuchh Kahna Hai	Lata Mangeshkar and Shailendra Singh	Anand Bakshi		
Ae Ae Ae Phansa	Lata Mangeshkar	Anand Bakshi	Picturized on Aruna Irani	
Na Mangun Sona Chandi	Manna Dey, Shailendra Singh and Chorus	Vithalbhai Patel		

== Box office ==
Worldwide gross (est.)
Territory	Gross revenue	Inflation-adjusted gross revenue (2016)	Footfalls
Domestic (India)	₹11 crore (US$14.21 million) (Note: 7.742 Indian rupees per US dollar in 1973)	₹895 crore (US$96 million)	53.5 million
Overseas (Soviet Union)	15.65 million Rbls (Note: 62.6 million tickets sold, average ticket price of 25 kopecks) – US$21.44 million (Note: 0.73 Rbl per US dollar in 1975) (₹19.24 crore) (Note: 8.973 Indian rupees per US dollar in 1975)	US$128 million (₹638 crore)	62.6 million
Worldwide	₹30.24 crore (US$39 million)	₹1,212 crore (US$184 million)	116 million

In India, Bobby was the highest-grossing film of 1973, earning ₹11 crore. It was also the second-highest-grossing film at the Indian box office in the 1970s, second only to Sholay (1975). Adjusted for inflation, it grossed ₹398 crore in 2011 value, equivalent to ₹895 crore (US$96 million) in 2016 value. As of 2011, it is one of the top 20 highest-grossing films of all time in India.

Overseas, Bobby was very successful in the Soviet Union when it released there in 1975, due to Raj Kapoor's popularity in the country. Bobby drew 62.6 million admissions at the Soviet box office, making it the second-best-selling film on the Soviet box office charts in 1975, the most popular Indian film of the 1970s, the second-biggest foreign film of the decade, the sixth-biggest box office hit of the decade, the second-most-viewed Indian film of all time (after Raj Kapoor's Awaara), the sixth-biggest foreign hit of all time, and one of the top 20 biggest box office hits of all time. The film's success launched Rishi Kapoor into an overnight movie star in the Soviet Union, much like Awaara had done for his father Raj Kapoor.

Similarly, the film was very successful in Southeast Asian countries such as Indonesia, Malaysia and Singapore. It was popular among non-Indian audiences in these countries, despite a lack of local language dubbing or subtitles upon its initial Malaysian release. It was among the most popular foreign films in Malaysia at the time, along with Bruce Lee films such as The Big Boss (1972). In China, the film was released in 1990.

== Critical reception ==
The Illustrated Weekly of India wrote upon release that despite a new style, the story formula remains the same as ever. The review further noted that despite some gimmicks, the film's commercial appeal is attributed to the two fresh-faced, delightful youngsters and praised the performances of the lead pair for acting with a natural ease and freshness. While Premnath was applauded for being outstanding as the expansive, volatile Braganza", Pran was accused of being typecast.

== Awards ==
21st Filmfare Awards:

Won

- Best Actor – Rishi Kapoor
- Best Actress – Dimple Kapadia (tied with Jaya Bhaduri for Abhimaan)
- Best Male Playback Singer – Narendra Chanchal for "Beshak Mandir Masjid"
- Best Art Direction – A. Rangaraj
- Best Sound Design – Allauddin Khan Qureshi

Nominated

- Best Film – Raj Kapoor
- Best Director – Raj Kapoor
- Best Supporting Actor – Prem Nath
- Best Supporting Actress – Aruna Irani
- Best Music Director – Laxmikant Pyarelal
- Best Lyricist – Anand Bakshi for "Hum Tum Ek Kamre Mein Band Ho"
- Best Lyricist – Anand Bakshi for "Main Shayar To Nahin"
- Best Lyricist – Vitthalbhai Patel for "Jhoot Bole Kava Kate"
- Best Male Playback Singer – Shailender Singh for "Main Shayar To Nahin"

1974 BFJA Awards:

- Best Male Playback Singer (Hindi Section) – Shailender Singh for "Main Shayar to Nahin"
- Best Audiographer (Hindi Section) – Alauddin Khan Qureshi

== Controversy ==
In his 2017 autobiography Khullam Khulla: Rishi Kapoor Uncensored, Rishi Kapoor revealed that he had paid ₹30,000 (equivalent to ₹980,000 or US$10,000 in 2026) to win him a Best Actor award. While it was inferred as the Filmfare Award since it was the only big-time award during the time, he clarified in an interview that he has not specified Filmfare or any other names in the book".

== See also ==
- 100 Crore Club
