= Insaniyat (1994 film) =

- Theatrical release poster
- Directed by: Ramanjit "Tony" Juneja
- Written by: Vijay Kaul
- Produced by: Tito Juneja
- Starring: Amitabh Bachchan; Sunny Deol; Jaya Prada; Raveena Tandon; Chunky Panday; Sonam; Anupam Kher; Nutan; Vinod Mehra; Prem Chopra
- Narrated by: Mukesh Khanna
- Cinematography: Sunil Sharma
- Edited by: Waman Bhonsle; Gurudutt Shirali
- Music by: Songs: Rajesh Roshan; Score: Louis Banks
- Production company: Navjeevan Films
- Distributed by: Bharat Shah
- Release date: 11 March 1994
- Running time: 170 minutes
- Country: India
- Language: Hindi
- Budget: ₹42.5 million (equivalent to ₹450 million or US$4.7 million in 2026)
- Box office: ₹112.2 million (equivalent to ₹1.2 billion or US$12 million in 2026)

Insaniyat (English: Humanity) is a 1994 Indian Hindi-language action thriller film directed by Ramanjit Juneja. The film features an ensemble cast of Amitabh Bachchan, Sunny Deol, Jaya Prada, Raveena Tandon, Chunky Panday, Sonam, Anupam Kher, Prem Chopra, Shafi Inamdar and in posthumous appearances Nutan and Vinod Mehra.

The film was touted as the only film in which Amitabh and Sunny had acted together.

It was launched in 1988, but faced numerous delays due to production issues. Vinod Mehra and Nutan both died in 1990 & 1991 respectively, although they had finished filming their scenes earlier. The film was finally released on 11 March 1994. Upon release it received negative reviews from critics and the biggest opening of the year but crashed due to the negative reviews. Eventually it finished as an average grosser and the 12th highest-grossing film of 1994.

== Plot ==
SSP Amar Nath Singh breaks into the fortress of criminal Goga, bashes him up, and arrests him. Incidentally, Goga was the one responsible for Amar's separation from his parents Hardayal and Shanti Devi. He takes him to the police headquarters where he commits suicide. But he comes to know that Goga has a son Brijbhan who is now a high-profile criminal with whom several police officers and Indian army officers are working to spread terrorism in India. Also, Brijbhan has kept Amar's childhood sweetheart Shalu in his captivity as his mistress. To stop them, Amar wants to unite two warring gangsters Karim and Hariharan who are constantly at loggerheads with each other due to their different religious backgrounds. Both of them regard Amar as their elder brother. Karim is in love with a girl named Salma.

Karim is a powerful and respected gang leader, but he is also driven by deep-seated hatred and rivalry. For years, his life has been defined by his intense and violent feud with Hari, a conflict fueled by their different religious backgrounds. Karim's identity and actions are inextricably tied to this animosity, and he is unable to see a path beyond their constant clashes.

The story shifts when Inspector Amar uncovers a massive criminal conspiracy led by the influential underworld don, Brijbhan. Recognizing the futility of fighting this formidable enemy alone, Amar finally devises an unconventional plan: he decides to unite the two warring gang leaders.

Amar's main challenge is to convince Karim to set aside his hatred. He approaches with an appeal to his humanity. He shows Karim how Brijbhan's criminal activities are indiscriminately harming innocent people and creating chaos, far beyond the scope of their personal rivalry. Karim understands that while their feud has been a source of violence, it is Brijbhan's actions that are a direct threat to the very fabric of society. Initially, Karim is resistant to the idea of an alliance, unable to let go of his long-held animosity toward Hari. However, through Amar's persistent efforts, Karim begins to see the bigger picture. He realizes that his rivalry with Hari has been a distraction, blinding him to a far more dangerous and destructive enemy. They forget all their differences and resolve to continue the battle between patriots and terrorists. They get hold of corrupt police officer Lotaram who is on Brijbhan's payroll, and extract a lot of information regarding Brijbhan's plans to spread terrorism. Concurrently, Shanti Devi finds out that Amar is actually her long-lost son, and goes to meet him in prison. Also, at the same time, Shalu manages to escape Brijbhan's captivity. She meets Amar in jail, and the two long-lost lovers have an emotional reunion. However Brijbhan, in disguise, manages to capture Shalu again.

At the time when Amar was being taken to the gallows to be hanged, Shalu, having lost all hope of being with Amar, consumes poison. Having somehow anticipated this, Amar makes a dramatic escape from the gallows and goes into hiding. On the way, he runs into his little sister Munni, who, owing to the recent events, had lost her mental balance and had become insane. Karim, with help from Hari, invades Brijbhan's fortress and begins decimating it. Salma uses herself as bait to trap a high-ranking army officer, who is killed by Karim. The poison's effect begins to show as Shalu collapses while dancing for Brijbhan. Shanti Devi begins to madly beat a drum to satisfy Brijbhan.

At the same time, Amar arrives with Munni, and a full-fledged fight ensues. Many of the terrorists are killed. Seeing this, an enraged Brijbhan fires at Shanti Devi, but Amar comes in between and is shot. Brijbhan kidnaps Munni and escapes. Amar gives chase, in the course of which he gets shot a few more times. He manages to catch up though, and rescues Munni. He brings Brijbhan back to his fortress and leaves him to be killed by Karim and Hari. Brijbhan meets his end at the hands of the duo.

Amar collapses due to his wounds. Shanti Devi begs him not to die, as she had already lost a son once. He assures her that Karim and Hari will take care of her and then dies.

== Cast ==
- Amitabh Bachchan as SSP Amar Nath Singh
- Sunny Deol as Karim Lala
- Chunky Pandey as Hariharan
- Jaya Prada as Shalu/Champabai, Amar's girlfriend
- Raveena Tandon as Salma, Karim's girlfriend
- Sonam as Radha, Hariharan's girlfriend
- Nutan as Shanti Devi
- Vinod Mehra as Nandu
- Anupam Kher as Brijbhan
- Prem Chopra as Police Inspector Lotaram
- Shafi Inamdar as Police Commissioner Shafi
- Goga Kapoor as Goga
- Alok Nath as Hardayal, Amar's father
- Sadashiv Amrapurkar as Deshpande
- Pallavi Joshi as Munni, Nandu's / Amar's Sister
- Rakesh Bedi as Dead Body
- Aftab Shivdasani as Young Amar Nath Singh

== Music and soundtrack ==
The background score was composed by Louis Banks. Rajesh Roshan composed the music for the film's songs, which were penned by Anjaan.

The songs were sung by a huge assembly of singers like Lata Mangeshkar, Asha Bhosle, Sadhana Sargam, Mohammed Aziz, Shabbir Kumar, Anwar, Anuradha Paudwal, Sapna Mukherjee, Sudesh Bhosle, Udit Narayan, Kumar Sanu, Mangal Singh, Vipin Sachdeva and Padmini Roy.

=== Track listing ===
No.	Title	Singer(s)	Length
1.	"Saathi Tera Pyar" (Duet)	Kumar Sanu & Sadhana Sargam	4:34
2.	"Laal Kaghari Ni"	Anuradha Paudwal & Vipin Sachdeva	5:32
3.	"Saare Ladke Kare To"	Asha Bhosle & Shabbir Kumar	6:25
4.	"Mere Dil Mein Too"	Mohammed Aziz, Sudesh Bhosle & Udit Narayan	7:30
5.	"Saathi Tera Pyar" (Female)	Sadhana Sargam	3:36
6.	"Haule Haule- Part- 1"	Mohammed Aziz, Kumar Sanu, Sadhana Sargam & Sapna Mukherjee	7:04
7.	"Main Naseeb Hoon"	Lata Mangeshkar & Anwar	6:07
8.	"Saathi Tera Pyar" (Male)	Kumar Sanu	2:34
9.	"Haule Haule- Part- 2"	Sadhana Sargam & Sapna Mukherjee	2:52
10.	"Kudi Ho Gayee"	Mangal Singh & Padmini Roy	5:30
11.	"Saathi Tera Pyar" (Sad)	Kumar Sanu & Sadhana Sargam	2:05
