= Shailendra Singh (singer) =

Indian playback singer and actor

- Born: 4 October 1952 (age 74); Bombay, Bombay State, India
- Genres: Ghazals, Bollywood
- Occupations: Singer, actor
- Instrument: Vocalist
- Years active: 1971–present

Shailendra Singh is an Indian playback singer and actor. He sang several Hindi and a few Marathi songs during the late 1970s and early 1980s.

== Early life ==
Shailendra Singh was born on 4 October 1952 in Mumbai, India to a Punjabi family. He studied at Hill Grange High School at Peddar Road, and did his graduation from St. Xavier's College, Mumbai. He then joined the Film and Television Institute of India in Pune to train as an actor. He also learnt classical Hindustani music from a Guru. His first break as a playback singer is Bobby, during his second year at the FTII.

== Career ==
Shailendra Singh had many hit songs to his credit. Raj Kapoor gave Singh a break when he signed him for Bobby. The song "Main Shayar To Nahin" became a big hit. His song "Humne Tumko Dekha" from the film Khel Khel Mein rocked the entire nation. His rendition of "Jaane Do Na" from Saagar along with Asha Bhosle added to the sensuality of the entire song. He tried his hand at acting in films like Agreement (with Rekha) and Do Jasoos, but those films flopped.

In addition to his singing career, he acted in a Bengali film Ajasra Dhanyabaad, opposite Aparna Sen.

In 1994, he was hospitalized for complication due to diabetes. He says that “The talk in the industry was that I had a heart attack and that I had died. I didn't die. But the rumours killed my career.” He considers himself better in singing than in acting.

== Filmography ==
=== Films ===
| Year | Film | Role |
|---|---|---|
| 1975 | Do Jasoos | Ashok Sinha |
| 1976 | Ajasra Dhanyabad | |
| 1976 | Ginny Aur Johnny | |
| 1979 | Janta Hawaldar | Doctor |
| 1979 | Nauker | Vijay |
| 1980 | Agreement | Shekhar Sinha |

=== Television ===
| Year | Show | Role | Notes |
|---|---|---|---|
| 1999 | Rishtey-The Love Stories (Episode 85 - 'Sparsh') | Akanksha's friend | |
| 2004 | Raat Hone Ko Hai | | |
| 2006–2009 | Kasamh Se | Partho Mitra | |

== Discography ==
| Year | Album | Songs | Notes |
|---|---|---|---|
| 1973 | Bobby | "Chabi Kho Jaye" / "Main Shayar To Nahin"/ "Mujhe Kuchh Kahna Hai"/"Na Mangun Sona Chandi" / "Jhoot Bole Kauva Kate" / "Mujhe Kuchh Kahna Hai (Revival)"/"Hum Tum Ek Kamre Mein Band Ho" | |
| 1974 | Zehreela Insaan | "Saanp Se Badhke" / "Mere Dil Se Ye Nahin" | |
| 1975 | Khel Khel Mein | "Humne Tumko Dekha" | |
| 1975 | Do Jasoos | "Purawaiyya, leke chali meri naiyya" (Duet with Lata Mangeshkar) | |
| 1975 | Rafoo Chakkar | "Kisi Pe Dil Agar Aa Jaye To" | |
| 1976 | Ajasra Dhanyabad | "Nadi Jodi Bole" | Bengali |
| 1977 | Amar Akbar Anthony | Title Song | |
| 1977 | Banya Bapu | "He gard nile megh" (Duet with Anuradha Paudwal) and "preeticha jhula jhula paani" (Duet with Usha Mangeshkar) | Marathi film |
| 1977 | Aap Ki Khatir | "Shola Re Bhola Re" | |
| 1977 | Ab Kya Hoga | "Aa Devta...." | |
| 1977 | Parvarish | "Jaate Ho Jane Jana" / "Hum Premi Prem Karna Jaanen" | |
| 1978 | Khatta Meetha | "Frenny O Frenny" | |
| 1978 | Ankhiyon Ke Jharokhon Se | "Ek Din Tum Bahut Bade Banoge" / "Kai Din Se Mujhe" | |
| 1979 | Taraana | "Gunche lage hain kahane" | |
| 1979 | Suhaag | "Ae Yaar Sun Yaari Teri" (Duet with Mohammed Rafi) | |
| 1979 | Saanch Ko Aanch Nahin | "Aankhon Ankhon Mein Dil Gaya Apna"/"Mere Bas Mein" | |
| 1979 | Ahsaas | "Sara Zamana Chod Chale" (Duet with Kishore Kumar)/ "Jo Na Chote Hai Na Bade" (Duet with Kishore Kumar) | |
| 1980 | Be-Reham | "Yeh Saal Ki Aakhiri Raat Hai" | |
| 1980 | Agreement | "Aapne Pyar Diya Pyar Se Maar Diya" / "Jeena Ye Koi Jeena To Nahin" | |
| 1980 | Taxi Chor | "Na Hum Pagal Hain" (Duet with Kishore Kumar) | |
| 1981 | Naseeb | "Rang Jamake Jayenge, Chakkar Chalake Jayenge, Jhumke, Ghumke Sabko Ghumake Jayenge" | |
| 1981 | Chashme Buddoor | "Is Nadi Ko Mera" / "Pyaar Lagawat Pranay Mohabbat" | |
| 1981 | Aapas Ki Baat | "Kehni Hain Do Baaten Tumse" | |
| 1981 | Zamane Ko Dikhana Hai | "Hoga Tumse Pyaara Koun" | |
| 1982 | Begunaah Qaidi | "Ta Thaiya" / "Yaar Sajana" | |
| 1982 | Ashanti | "Main Hoon Sharabi" / "Na Tujhse Na Mujhse" | |
| 1982 | Aadat Se Majboor | "Andar Ki Baat Hai" / "Ram Kare Ke Umar Qaid" | |
| 1982 | Bhai Aakhir Bhai Hota Hai | "Aa Bhi Ja Meri Jaan" | |
| 1982 | Bhed Blav | "Woh Ladki Hansi To" | |
| 1982 | Karwat | Kuchh Ladke Kuchh Ladkiyan" | |
| 1983 | Bekaraar | "Bekaraar Kiya" | |
| 1984 | Bad Aur Badnam | "Is Zindagi Ka Talabgar" | |
| 1984 | Manzil Manzil | “O Meri Jaan” / "Jhalak Dikhake Kar Gayi Deewana" / “Lut Gaye Hum To Rahon Mein” / “Ye Naina Yaad Hain” | |
| 1985 | Saagar | "Jaane Do Na" | |
| 1985 | Aar Paar | "Mera Naam Pannabai" | |
| 1985 | Arjun | "Mammaiya Kero Mamma" | |
| 1986 | Amma | "Tumhen Qasam Hai" | |
| 1987 | Aag Hi Aag | "Pyar Se Hai Duniya Haseen, Pyar Nahin To Kuch Nahin" | |
| 1987 | Satyamev Jayate | "Tan Hai Hamara" | |
| 1990 | Amiri Garibi | "O Meri Sasu O Mere Sale" | |
| 1992 | Shola Aur Shabnam | "Tere Mere Pyar Mein" | |
| 1992 | Sapne Sajan Ke | "Dil Ne Jo Socha Tha Tum Bilkul Waise Ho" | |
| 1993 | Gurudev | "Jaipur se nikli gadi" / "Aana Re, Aana Re, Dil Hai Deewana Re, Chadhti Jawani Kuch Aur Nahin Jane" | |
| 2008 | Bhole Shankar | "Jai Ho Chhath Maiya" | |
| | BIG B @ 60 | "Ae Yaar Sun Yaari Teri" (from Suhaag) | |
| | | One India My India - With Kapil Dev | |

== Awards ==
- 1974 – Nominated for Filmfare Award for Best Male Playback Singer – "Mai Shayar Toh Nahi" (Bobby).
