= Dial 100 (1982 film) =

- Directed by: S. Ramanathan
- Written by: Vsilai Somanathan; Partho Mukherjee; Khalid Narvi; Sayyed Mahajan
- Produced by: Ram Raj Kalamandir
- Starring: Vinod Mehra; Bindiya Goswami; Aruna Irani; Helen
- Cinematography: Kaygee; Habib Ahmed; V. Keshav
- Edited by: Paul Dorai Singam
- Music by: Bappi Lahiri
- Release date: 7 May 1982
- Running time: 145 minutes
- Country: India
- Language: Hindi

Dial 100 is a 1982 Bollywood crime drama film, directed by S. Ramanathan. It stars Vinod Mehra, Bindiya Goswami in lead roles and music by Bappi Lahiri.

== Plot ==
Seth Dindayal was killed by Rana and Raju and they attempted to steal valuable diamonds. They hide the stolen diamonds in a guitar belonging to Gautam, the singer. Police accused Gautam of the crime.

== Cast ==
- Ashok Kumar
- Vinod Mehra as Gautam
- Bindiya Goswami as Geeta
- Aruna Irani as Sunita
- Shashikala as Shanti
- Helen as Julie
- Ranjeet as Rana
- Sujit Kumar as Raju
- Danny Denzongpa as Pandit Shambhu Sen
- Amjad Khan as Sher Khan
- Mehmood
- Manorama as Mrs. D'Costa
- Keshto Mukherjee as Advocate P.K. Bahke
- Jagdeep as Bhaijaan Bhopali
- Asrani as Biradar Bangali
- Pinchoo Kapoor as Seth Din Dayal
- Krishan Dhawan as Inspector Dalvi
- Chandrashekhar as Inspector Verma

== Soundtrack ==
Song	Singer
"Dekhe Tujhe Jo Dekhe"	Kishore Kumar
"Aaj Milne Ka Vada Hai"	Kishore Kumar, Mahendra Kapoor, Chandrani Mukherjee, Minoo Purushottam
"Aadhi Aadhi Raat"	Asha Bhosle, Kishore Kumar
"Nachoon Main"	Asha Bhosle, Kishore Kumar
"Koi Kunwara Mara Gaya"	Asha Bhosle, Bappi Lahiri, Manna Dey
"Allah Ho Akbar"	Manna Dey
