= Maujaan Dubai Diyaan =

- Directed by: Subhash C. Bhakri
- Written by: Om Prakash Bhasin
- Starring: Vinod Mehra; Bhavana Bhatt; Madhu Malini; Aruna Irani; Ranjeet; Iftekhar; Kaajal Kiran; Mithun Chakraborty
- Release date: 1985
- Running time: 120 minutes
- Country: India
- Language: Punjabi

Maujaan Dubai Diyaan is a 1985 Indian Punjabi-language film directed by Subhash C. Bhakri, starring Vinod Mehra, Bhavana Bhatt, Madhu Malini, Aruna Irani, Ranjeet, Iftekhar, Kaajal Kiran and Mithun Chakraborty.
