= Agreement (film) =

- Poster
- Directed by: Anil Ganguly
- Story by: Rajani Ganguly (story); Irshad (dialogue); Surendra Shailaj (screenplay)
- Produced by: Joginder Singh
- Starring: Rekha; Utpal Dutt; Aruna Irani; Shailendra Singh
- Cinematography: Dilip Ranjan
- Edited by: Waman B. Bhosle; Gurudutt Shirali
- Music by: Bappi Lahiri
- Release date: 8 August 1980
- Running time: 122 mins
- Country: India
- Language: Hindi

Agreement is a 1980 Bollywood drama film directed by Anil Ganguly and produced by Joginder Singh. The film starred Rekha and Shailendra Singh in leading roles.

== Cast ==
- Rekha as Mala Mathur
- Utpal Dutt as Mr. Mathur
- Shailendra Singh as Shekhar Sinha
- Asrani as Dilip aka Kanoonchand
- Aruna Irani as Chanda
- Sujit Kumar as Deepak
- Bindu as Pinki
- Nandita Thakur as Shanta
- Dinesh Hingoo as Munshi Totaram
- Viju Khote
- Piloo J. Wadia
- Farita Boyce
- Master Sandeep
- Taneja
- Prem Kumar

== Plot ==
Agreement is a satire film with Rekha, Utpal Dutta, and Shailendra Singh in the main roles. Mala is remotely taught, achieved, and holds an advanced perspective on ladies' job in marriage and difficulties older uncle Mr. Mathur ( Utpal Dutta ) to demonstrate her point. The fact of the matter was that she will choose a spouse who will resemble a hireling and cook to her and she will discover a lot of contenders to take this activity. In the long run, both Mala and Shekhar build up a sentimental relationship and things end up true to form.

== Soundtrack ==
lyrics were written by Gulshan Bawra

- "Aapne Pyar Diya" - Shailendra Singh
- "Jane Kyon Mujhe" - Lata Mangeshkar
- "Jeena Bhi Koi Jeena Hai" - Shailendra Singh
- "Suno Suno Baat Pate Ki" - Lata Mangeshkar
