= Jurmana (1979 film) =

- Poster
- Directed by: Hrishikesh Mukherjee
- Screenplay by: Bimal Dutta
- Story by: Bimal Dutta
- Produced by: Debesh Ghosh; Shri Lokenath Chitramandir
- Starring: Amitabh Bachchan; Raakhee; Vinod Mehra
- Cinematography: Jaywant Pathare
- Edited by: Subhash Gupta
- Music by: Rahul Dev Burman
- Release date: 1 May 1979
- Running time: 139 min
- Country: India
- Language: Hindi

Jurmana (lit. 'Penalty') is a 1979 Hindi romantic drama film. It was produced by Debesh Gosh and directed by Hrishikesh Mukherjee. The film stars Amitabh Bachchan, Raakhee, Vinod Mehra, Shreeram Lagoo, A. K. Hangal, Asrani, Farida Jalal, Keshto Mukherjee and Asit Sen. The lyrics were written by Anand Bakshi and the music was composed by R. D. Burman.

== Plot ==
Inder Saxena is a building contractor from Delhi with an attitude that money is the foremost thing in the world. His maternal uncle persuades a reluctant Inder to visit and supervise a project's progress at Pratapgarh. Once there, he meets his college mate Prakashq, his professor Daya Shankar Sharma and his daughter Rama. Inder sets his eyes on Rama, but Prakash, secretly admiring Rama, tells Inder that she is the kind of girl who can't be lured with the power of money. But, Inder has a firm perception that women want only money and bets Prakash that he will lure Rama with his money. After everything from his bag of tricks fails, he publishes a book of her poems and gifts it to her. This gesture surprises Rama and she is very delighted. One day, Inder asks Rama to accompany him. Rama promises him and lies to her father about seeing off Laila. Upon learning the truth, Daya Shankar unexpectedly drops in with Prakash at Inder's house, finds Rama in his bedroom and scorns her for lying. Rama leaves the house forever and while heading towards Delhi and is robbed, for which she has to get off of the train. Distressed Rama gets the help of Station Master Nandalal, who shelters her in his house. Coincidentally, the same train meets with an accident. Assuming an unrecognizable damaged body to be Rama, the police send a letter to Daya Shankar about her death, shocking everyone. Inder, feeling guilty for the incident, believes that Rama is alive and searches for her. Meanwhile, Rama learns singing to forget her sorrows and becomes a renowned singer. One day, Inder hears her singing on the radio, finds her out and informs Prakash. Eventually with all misunderstandings and differences settled, Rama and Inder come together.

== Cast ==
- Amitabh Bachchan – Inder Saxena
- Raakhee – Rama Sharma
- Vinod Mehra – Prem Prakash Trivedi
- Dr. Shreeram Lagoo – Prof. Dayashankar Sharma
- Asrani – Nandlal Chaturvedi
- A. K. Hangal – Pt. Prabhakar Chaturvedi, Nandlal's Mamaji
- Farida Jalal – Laila
- Ashit Sen – Dr. Kabir
- Keshto Mukherjee – Babu Ram
- Yunus Parvez – Lalaji
- Moolchand – Lala's Brother-In-Law
- Brahm Bhardwaj – Inder's Mamaji
- Manju Asrani
- Meenaxi Anand
- Jagjit Uppal
- Raj Verma
- Ahmer Azmi

== Soundtrack ==
All lyrics are written by Anand Bakshi; all music is composed by Rahul Dev Burman.

No.	Title	Singer(s)	Length
1.	"Sawan Ke Jhoole Pade Hai" (Raga Pahadi)	Lata Mangeshkar	5:25
2.	"Ai Sakhi Radhike Bawri Ho Gai"	Lata Mangeshkar, Manna Dey	6:10
3.	"Chhoti Si Ek Kali Khili Thi"	Lata Mangeshkar	5:10
4.	"Nachoon Main Gao Tum"	Asha Bhosle, Rahul Dev Burman	5:55
5.	"Sawan Ke Jhoole Pade Hai" (Raga Pahadi)	Lata Mangeshkar	3:50
6.	"Chhotisi Ek Kali"	Instrumental	5:15
7.	"Title Music"	Instrumental	1:30

== Awards ==
27th Filmfare Awards:

Nominated

- Best Director – Hrishikesh Mukherjee
- Best Actress – Raakhee
- Best Supporting Actress – Farida Jalal
- Best Lyricist – Anand Bakshi for "Saawan Ke Jhoole Pade Hai"
