= Parde Ke Peechey =

- Directed by: K. Shankar
- Starring: Vinod Mehra; Yogeeta Bali; Bindu
- Release date: 1971
- Country: India
- Language: Hindi

Parde Ke Peechey (lit. 'Behind the Purdah') is a 1971 Bollywood drama film. The film stars Vinod Mehra, Yogeeta Bali and Bindu.

== Cast ==
- Vinod Mehra as Rajan
- Yogeeta Bali as Tara
- Bindu as Suchitra
- Jagdeep as Gautam
- Pran as Balwant
- Padma Khanna
- Tarun Bose
- P. R. Varalakshmi

== Music ==
The music was composed by Shankar Jaikishan.

1. "Adi Adi Ruk Ja Kudi, Arey Surat Se Keya Pehchanoge" – Kishore Kumar
2. "Tum Jab Jab Samne Aate Ho" – Kishore Kumar, Lata Mangeshkar (https://www.youtube.com/watch?v=d0qvjVShD0o
3. "Tere Bina Jiya Na Lage, Aja Re Aja" – Lata Mangeshkar
4. "Dil Deewane Dil Deewane Tune Socha Bhi Hai Ki Kaun Hai Tera" – Lata Mangeshkar
5. "Jab Husn Ka Jaadu Sir Pe Chad Ke Bolta Hai" – Asha Bhosle
6. "Teen Kanwariya Teen Kanwariya Hathon Me Mehndi Racha De Koi" – Shamshad Begum, Usha Mangeshkar, Asha Bhosle
