= Gurudev (film) =

- Theatrical release poster
- Directed by: Vinod Mehra
- Written by: Prayag Raj (screenplay and story); K. K. Shukla (screenplay); K. K. Singh (dialogue)
- Produced by: Vinod Mehra
- Starring: Rishi Kapoor; Anil Kapoor; Sridevi
- Cinematography: Baba Azmi; S. Pappu
- Music by: R. D. Burman
- Release date: 3 September 1993
- Running time: 180 mins
- Country: India
- Language: Hindi

Gurudev is a 1993 Bollywood action film produced and directed by Vinod Mehra. The film started production in the late 1980s and was left incomplete after Vinod Mehra's death in October 1990. Raj Sippy took over as director and completed it for release in 1993.

The film stars Rishi Kapoor, Anil Kapoor, and Sridevi in lead roles. Kader Khan, Kiran Kumar, Danny Denzongpa, and Pran appear in supporting roles.

== Plot ==
Inspector Dev and Gaurav, fondly called "Guru" are childhood friends. While Dev is with the police, Parshuram, works with the underworld and is the right-hand man of Khakan, a criminal don who is Guru's father.

When Inspector Khan is assigned the case of apprehending Khakan, his first suspect is Dev himself. Dev must prove to Khan that he is earnest and will not hesitate to arrest Khakan. It remains to be seen if Dev will apprehend his friend's father or just play around.

== Cast ==
- Rishi Kapoor as Inspector Dev
- Anil Kapoor as Gaurav "Guru"
- Sridevi as Priya / Sunita / Rosy (Double Role)
- Kader Khan as Inspector Khan
- Kiran Kumar as Bhola Pandey
- Danny Denzongpa as Khakan
- Pran as Parshuram
- Satyen Kappu as Satyen
- Seema Deo as Saraswati
- Chandrashekhar as Police Commissioner
- Harish Patel as Police Inspector
- Mahavir Shah as Mahaveer Pandey
- Tej Sapru as Murli Pandey
- Gurbachan Singh as Gurbachan
- Mac Mohan as Mac
- Asrani as Sur Pakde
- Shammi as Sur Tali
- Viju Khote as Pathan
- Mehmood Jr. as Postman

== Soundtrack ==
The music was composed by R. D. Burman with lyrics penned by Majrooh Sultanpuri.

Song	Singer
"Mera Kaha Manoge"	Asha Bhosle
"Aaja Sunle Sada, Tu Hai Kahan Jaan-E-Wafa"	Asha Bhosle, Rahul Dev Burman
"Jaipur Se Nikli Gaadi Dilli Chale Halle Halle"	Asha Bhosle, Shailendra Singh
"Aana Re, Aana Re, Dil Hai Deewana Re, Chadhti Jawani Kuch Aur Nahin Jane"	Asha Bhosle, Shailendra Singh, Amit Kumar
"Ek Din Tera Dheere Se"	Amit Kumar
