= Karwat =

- Vinyl Records Cover
- Directed by: Anil Ganguly
- Produced by: Askari Jafri
- Starring: Mithun Chakraborty; Rakesh Roshan; Bindiya Goswami; Zarina Wahab; Deven Verma
- Music by: Bappi Lahiri
- Release date: 9 May 1982
- Running time: 130 minutes
- Country: India
- Language: Hindi

Karwat is a 1982 Bollywood action film directed by Anil Ganguly, starring Mithun Chakraborty, Rakesh Roshan, Bindiya Goswami and Zarina Wahab. The film was released in 1987 under the name Mera Yaar Mera Dushman.

== Cast ==
- Mithun Chakraborty
- Rakesh Roshan
- Bindiya Goswami
- Zarina Wahab
- Sujit Kumar
- Deven Verma
- Geeta Nizami

== Soundtrack ==
#	Title	Singer(s)
1	"Karwat Badal Badal"	Kishore Kumar
2	"Beoda Pahije Mala"	Kishore Kumar
3	"Kabhi Khul Ke Mile"	Kishore Kumar, Asha Bhosle
4	"Kuchh Ladke Kuchh Ladkiyan"	Mahendra Kapoor, Shailendra Singh, Manhar Udhas
5	"Hansi Loot Gayee"	Asha Bhosle
