= Nauker (1979 film) =

- Directed by: Ismail Memon
- Produced by: Govindram Ahuja; Ismail Memon
- Music by: R. D. Burman
- Release date: 7 December 1979
- Country: India
- Language: Hindi

Nauker (translation: Servant) is a 1979 Indian Hindi-language film, directed by Ismail Memon and stars Jaya Bhaduri, Mehmood and Sanjeev Kumar in lead roles. The movie is perhaps best remembered for Jaya Bhaduri's performance as the servant Geeta. This role earned her a third Filmfare Award for Best Actress.

== Plot ==
Amar (Sanjeev Kumar) is a wealthy widower who lives with his daughter and a servant Dayal (Mehmood) in Bhopal. He is constantly bothered by his sister and brother-in-law (Anwar Hussain), who want him to remarry - if not for his sake, then for the sake of his young daughter who needs the love of a mother. Amar, having had enough, reluctantly agrees to marry. They scout for potential wives, and decide to choose between two sisters - Shobha (Madhu Malini) and Sheela (Meena T.) - who reside in Bombay. Since Amar has never met either of them, he is not sure if one of them will be the appropriate choice. In order to test them, he visits them in Bombay and decides to swap places with his servant Dayal. The party (Amar and family) arrive at the prospective in-laws' house, which includes Durga (Lalita Pawar), the arrogant and abusive prospective mother-in-law and her weak and helpless husband and father of their two daughters. Dayal (as Amar) is given a spacious room, and Amar (as Dayal) is settled into the servant's quarters, which consists of an untidy room with no electricity. Soon, Amar realises that he is in fact attracted to Geeta (Jaya Bhaduri), (the household servant) but he cannot reveal himself and openly propose marriage to her, since he is posing as a servant. Meanwhile, Durga starts getting suspicious about Amar (as Dayal), and starts wondering if Amar is actually a servant or a crook, to great comic effect.

Dayal's younger brother Vijay, who is studying in Bombay and is supported by Dayal, is Sheela's secret college boyfriend, unbeknownst to her parents and to Dayal. Dayal (as Amar) discovers this by accident when on a date with Shobha in a club.

== Cast ==
- Sanjeev Kumar as Amar
- Jaya Bachchan as Geeta
- Mehmood as Dayal
- Shailendra Singh as Vijay
- Madhu Malini as Shobha
- Manmohan Krishna as Shanti Swaroop
- Lalita Pawar as Durga
- Meena T(Talpade as Sheela
- Yogeeta Bali as Guest Appearance in the song "Dekhi Hazaaron Mehfilein"
- Jalal Agha as Jaggu
- Anwar Hussain as

== Music ==
Lyrics: Majrooh Sultanpuri

Song	Singer
"Chandni Re Jhoom" (Male)	Kishore Kumar
"Pallo Latke Re Mharo Pallo Latke"	Kishore Kumar, Asha Bhosle
"Chandni Re Jhoom" (Female)	Lata Mangeshkar
"Dekhi Hazaron Mehfilen, Par Yeh Fiza Kuch Aur Hai"	Mohammed Rafi, Asha Bhosle
"Aaya Na Karo Gudiya"	Asha Bhosle

27th Filmfare Awards:

Won

- Filmfare Award for Best Actress – Jaya Bachchan
