= Kartavya (1979 film) =

1979 Hindi-language action drama film

- Directed by: Mohan Sehgal
- Written by: S. Ali Raza
- Story by: M. P. Shankar
- Based on: Gandhada Gudi by M.D Sundar and M. P. Shankar
- Produced by: Mohan Sehgal
- Starring: Dharmendra; Rekha; Vinod Mehra; Nirupa Roy; Aruna Irani; Ranjeet; Utpal Dutt; Suresh Oberoi
- Music by: Laxmikant-Pyarelal
- Production company: Delux Films
- Release date: 11 May 1979
- Country: India
- Language: Hindi

Kartavya is a 1979 Indian Hindi-language action drama film directed by Mohan Sehgal. The music in the film is composed by Laxmikant-Pyarelal. The film stars Dharmendra, Rekha, Vinod Mehra, Nirupa Roy, Aruna Irani, Ranjeet, Utpal Dutt and Suresh Oberoi. The film is a remake of the 1973 Kannada film Gandhada Gudi. The film was a superhit at the box office.

== Cast ==
- Dharmendra as Vijay
- Rekha as Neeta
- Vinod Mehra as Ajay / Dushyant Rai
- Nirupa Roy as Vijay & Ajay's Mother
- Aruna Irani as Lachhi
- Ranjeet as Jacob
- Utpal Dutt as Diwan Dhanpat Rai
- Suresh Oberoi as Forest Officer

== Crew ==
- Direction – Mohan Sehgal
- Production – Mohan Sehgal
- Music Direction – Laxmikant–Pyarelal
- Lyrics – Varma Malik, Kafil Azar
- Playback – Asha Bhosle, Lata Mangeshkar, Mohammed Rafi, Usha Mangeshkar

== Soundtrack ==
Song	Singer
"Koi Aayega"	Lata Mangeshkar
"Chaila Babu Tu"	Lata Mangeshkar
"Doori Na Rahe Koi"	Lata Mangeshkar
"Chanda Mama Se Pyara Mere Mama" (Happy)	Mohammed Rafi, Usha Mangeshkar
"Chanda Mama Se Pyara Mere Mama" (Sad)	Mohammed Rafi, Usha Mangeshkar
"Maine Thodi Si Chadhayi To Aisi Chadhi"	Mohammed Rafi, Asha Bhosle
"Mera Dil Leke Chal Diye"	Asha Bhosle
