= Heeron Ka Chor =

- Poster
- Directed by: S. K. Kapoor
- Produced by: S. K. Kapoor
- Starring: Ashok Kumar; Mithun Chakraborty; Bindiya Goswami; Shakti Kapoor; Madan Puri; Helen
- Music by: Sonik Omi
- Release date: 8 June 1982
- Running time: 135 minutes
- Country: India
- Language: Hindi

Heeron Ka Chor (transl. Diamond robber) is a 1982 Indian Hindi-language action film directed by S. K. Kapoor, starring Ashok Kumar, Mithun Chakraborty, Bindiya Goswami, Shakti Kapoor, Madan Puri, and Helen in pivotal roles. The music was composed by Sonik Omi.

== Premise ==
It is the story of a mastermind thief, who plans and executes as well as succeeds in a great diamond robbery.

== Cast ==
- Ashok Kumar as Mr. Khanna
- Mithun Chakraborty as Mohan Khanna
- Bindiya Goswami as Geeta
- Shakti Kapoor as Rana
- Madan Puri as Danny
- Helen as Tina
- Chandrasekhar
- Pinchoo Kapoor
- Jai Raj
- Rajendra Nath
- Tun Tun
- Amol Sen as dwarf man (Tun Tun) husband

== Soundtrack ==
Song	Singer
"Phoolon Se Hai Meri Dosti"	Mohammed Rafi
"Yeh Jawani Hai Meri Jaan, Dhoom Machane Ke Liye"	Asha Bhosle, Mohammed Rafi
"Kuch Aise Aashiq Samne Main Lanewali Hoon"	Asha Bhosle, Mohammed Rafi
"Chilman Se Nikalkar Samne Aa"	Asha Bhosle, Aziz Nazan
"Mera Dil Dhak Dhak Karta Hai"	Amit Kumar, Chandrani Mukherjee
