= Mr. Natwarlal =

- Film poster
- Directed by: Rakesh Kumar
- Written by: Gyandev Agnihotri (Story); Kader Khan (Dialogue); Rakesh Kumar (Screenplay)
- Produced by: Tony Glaad
- Starring: Amitabh Bachchan; Rekha; Ajit; Kader Khan; Amjad Khan
- Cinematography: Fali Mistry
- Edited by: Waman B. Bhosle; Gurudutt Shirali
- Music by: Rajesh Roshan
- Production company: Navjeevan Productions
- Release date: 8 June 1979
- Running time: 148 minutes
- Country: India
- Language: Hindi

Mr. Natwarlal is a 1979 Indian Hindi-language action comedy film produced by Tony Glaad (as "Tony") and directed by Rakesh Kumar. The film stars Amitabh Bachchan, Rekha, Ajit, Kader Khan, Amjad Khan and the music is by Rajesh Roshan, the songs are written by Anand Bakshi. The highlight of the film was a children's song sung by Amitabh Bachchan. Tony Glaad decided to take them as the writers of the film. The film was shot in Kashmir with most of the shooting done in Beerwah, Jammu and Kashmir. Film and music expert Rajesh Subramanian revealed, that the vocals for "Mere Paas Aao" were to be recorded by Kishore Kumar, but since Amitabh Bachchan was planning a mega live concert abroad, he wanted to sing a song in his voice to perform live at the concerts, hence it was sung by Bachchan.

The name of the film and lead character were inspired by a notorious Indian conman, Natwarlal.

Getting Amitabh to sing was a gimmick that was tried for the first time in this film. Kabhi Kabhie earlier had Amitabh use spoken verse within a melodic song, but this was the first time he sang in a film. This was subsequently copied by other filmmakers in films like Laawaris, Silsila and Pukar.

As per a trade guide, which was premium box-office publication in the 1970s and 1980s, Mr. Natwarlal was a "Super Hit". In today's lenient classification system, Mr. Natwarlal is easily a blockbuster.

== Story ==
Natwar is a young boy, when his beloved older brother and caretaker, police officer Girdharilal, is framed for bribery by the sinister criminal mastermind Vikram. When he grows up, Natwar creates a secret identity for himself, posing as a powerful and mysterious underworld figure named Mr. Natwarlal, determined to slowly but surely exact vengeance on Vikram. Girdharilal does not understand his motives and develops a grudge against him.

Natwar learns from Mickey, an infamous underworld figure and Vikram's former ally, who is posing as a burnt man, that Vikram is in a village called Chandanpur and wants a diamond necklace, which is in the possession of Fakirchand, one of Mickey's allies. Natwar steals the necklace, unknown to everyone present there and leaves for Chandanpur, after apologising to an asleep Girdharilal about the troubles he has given to him. Meanwhile, it is revealed that Mickey also wants to exact revenge on Vikram for betraying him. He reveals that Vikram is terrorising the villagers using a tiger. Natwar arrives at Chandanpur, disguised as Avtar Singh, a hunter whom Vikram had already killed, unknown to everyone.

== Cast ==
- Amitabh Bachchan as Natwar/Mr Natwarlal
- Rekha as Shanno
- Ajit as Inspector Girdharilal
- Indrani Mukherjee as Seema Singh
- Kader Khan as Mukhiya / Baba
- Amjad Khan as Vikram Singh
- Satyen Kappu as Mickey
- Yunus Parvez as Seth Fakirchand
- Iftekhar as Shyamlal Saxena
- Moolchand as Seth Dharamdas
- Gurbachan Singh as

== Awards ==
27th Filmfare Awards:

Nominated

- Best Actor – Amitabh Bachchan
- Best Music Director – Rajesh Roshan
- Best Male Playback Singer – Amitabh Bachchan for "Mere Paas Aao"

== Soundtrack ==
The music was composed by Rajesh Roshan and the lyrics were penned by Anand Bakshi. Rajesh Roshan was nominated for Best Music Director award for the film; Laxmikant-Pyarelal received the award for Sargam that year.

| Song | Singer |
|---|---|
| "Pardesia, Yeh Sach Hai Piya, Sab Kehte Hain" | Kishore Kumar, Lata Mangeshkar |
| "Mere Paas Aao Mere Doston, Ek Qissa Suno" | Amitabh Bachchan |
| "Qayamat Hai, Yeh Kaisi Gham Ki Shaam Hai" | Mohammad Rafi, Anuradha Paudwal |
| "Oonchi Oonchi Baaton Se Kisi Ka Pet Bharta Nahin" | Mohammad Rafi, Usha Mangeshkar |
| "Tauba Tauba, Kya Hoga" | Asha Bhosle |

The song "Pardesia" by Kishore Kumar and Lata Mangeshkar, of this movie was popular, besides "Oonchi Oonchi Baaton Se" by Mohammed Rafi and Usha Mangeshkar.

Amitabh Bachchan has a solo number on his own; "Mere Paas Aao Mere Doston". This song was his second-Self sung bollywood song. First was "Mere Angne Mein" from the movie Lawaris[1981]
