= Kaala Patthar =

1979 film by Yash Chopra

- Directed by: Yash Chopra
- Written by: Salim–Javed
- Based on: Chasnala mining disaster Joseph Conrad's Lord Jim (1900)
- Produced by: Yash Chopra
- Starring: Amitabh Bachchan; Shashi Kapoor; Shatrughan Sinha; Raakhee Gulzar; Neetu Singh; Parveen Babi; Parikshat Sahni; Prem Chopra
- Cinematography: Kay Gee
- Edited by: B. Mangeshkar
- Music by: Songs: Rajesh Roshan; Score: Salil Chowdhury
- Production company: Yash Raj Films
- Distributed by: Yash Raj Films
- Release date: 9 August 1979
- Running time: 171 mins
- Country: India
- Language: Hindi

Kaala Patthar (transl. Black Stone) is a 1979 Indian Hindi-language disaster action drama produced and directed by Yash Chopra, with a screenplay written by Salim–Javed. Based on the Chasnala mining disaster, and loosely inspired by Joseph Conrad's novel Lord Jim (1900), it is the fourth collaboration between director Chopra and actors Shashi Kapoor and Amitabh Bachchan, succeeding the films Deewaar (1975), Kabhie Kabhie (1976) and Trishul (1978).

The film was a box office hit and received several Filmfare Award nominations.

== Plot ==
Vijay Pal Singh is a disgraced Merchant Navy captain who is branded a coward, humiliated by society and disowned by his parents for abandoning his ship and risking the lives of over 300 passengers. Feeling guilty over his cowardice, he starts working as a coal miner to forget his past. He meets and becomes friends with Ravi, an engineer in charge of the mines. He also makes an enemy in another co-worker named Mangal who is an escaped convict working in the mines to avoid the police. Vijay's past comes to haunt him every time he tries to get some sleep. He sees Mangal causing trouble for the coal miners, Vijay tries to defend the miners against Mangal, there are a couple of fights between them and then one day Mangal is injured in an incident and Vijay carries him to Dr. Sudha's surgery and gives his own blood to save Mangal's life, they eventually become friends. The one person who supports Vijay is Dr. Sudha Sen, who tries to make Vijay face up to his past and move on. Ravi and Mangal have their own romances with Anita and Channo, respectively.

Seth Dhanraj is a greedy boss who makes life difficult for the coal miners by giving them poor equipment, less than sufficient medical supplies and lack of facilities, Vijay, Ravi, and Mangal come together to fight for justice against Dhanraj. Water floods the mines, endangering the lives of hundreds of workers trapped underground. Ravi, Vijay, and Mangal succeed in saving the miners, although Ravi injures his leg and Mangal dies.

== Cast ==
Actor	Character	Notes
Shashi Kapoor	Ravi Malhotra	Coal mine engineer
Amitabh Bachchan	Vijay Pal Singh	Ex-Navy captain, coal mine worker
Rakhee Gulzar	Dr. Sudha Sen	Doctor
Shatrughan Sinha	Mangal Singh	Fugitive, mine worker
Neetu Singh	Channo	Bangle seller
Parveen Babi	Anita	Press reporter/photographer
Sanjeev Kumar	Dr. Mathur	Guest appearance, uncredited
Parikshit Sahni	Jagga	Truck driver
Prem Chopra	Dhanraj Puri	Coal mine owner
Romesh Sharma	Vikram	Guest appearance
Poonam Dhillon		Raghunath's daughter, guest appearance
Manmohan Krishna		Dhaba owner
Madan Puri		Vikram's father
Iftekhar	Mr. Singh	Vijay's father, retired military man
Sudha Chopra	Mrs. Singh	Vijay's mother
Satyendra Kapoor	Raghunath	
Gita Siddharth	Mrs. Raghunath	
Sharat Saxena	Dhanna	Mine worker
Mohan Sherry	Shankar	Mine worker
Yunus Parvez	Maneklal Saxena	Chief Engineer
Vikas Anand	Ram Singh	Supervisor
Mac Mohan	Rana	Mine worker
Jagdish Raj		Police inspector
Gautam Sarin		Naval chief officer
Suresh Oberoi		Naval officer
Madhu Malhotra		Item girl in the river (Song: Ik Raasta Hai Zindagi)

== Soundtrack ==
The film score was composed by Salil Chowdhury and the music for the songs was composed by Rajesh Roshan with lyrics written by Sahir Ludhianvi.

- "Ek Raasta Hai Zindagi" was listed at #14 on Binaca Geetmala annual list 1979.
- "Baahon Mein Teri" was listed at #30 on Binaca Geetmala annual list 1979.

No.	Title	Singer(s)	Length
1.	"Ek Raasta Hai Zindagi"	Kishore Kumar, Lata Mangeshkar	5:20
2.	"Baahon Mein Teri"	Lata Mangeshkar, Mohammad Rafi	4:15
3.	"Meri Dooron Se Aye Baaraat"	Lata Mangeshkar, Chorus	3:20
4.	"Jagaya Jagaya"	Mahendra Kapoor, S. K. Mahan, Pamela Chopra	6:55
5.	"Dhoom Mache Dhoom"	Lata Mangeshkar, Mohammad Rafi, Mahendra Kapoor, S.K. Mahan	7:40
6.	"Mujhe Pyaar Ka Tohfa Dekar"	Mohammad Rafi, Usha Mangeshkar	5:15

== Awards and nominations ==
27th Filmfare Awards:

Nominated

- Best Film – Yash Chopra
- Best Director – Yash Chopra
- Best Actor – Amitabh Bachchan
- Best Supporting Actor – Shatrughan Sinha
- Best Supporting Actress – Neetu Singh
- Best Music Director – Rajesh Roshan
- Best Male Playback Singer – Kishore Kumar for "Ek Raasta Hai Zindagi"
- Best Story – Salim–Javed
