= Aahat – Ek Ajib Kahani =

Aahat
- poster of Aahat
- Directed by: Kishore Rege
- Produced by: Franklin Fernandes; Vishal
- Starring: Vinod Mehra; Jaya Bachchan
- Music by: Chetan
- Release date: 26 February 2010
- Country: India
- Language: Hindi

Aahat – Ek Ajib Kahani, shortly called Aahat, is a 2010 India film directed by Kishore Rege and produced by Vishal. Although shot in 1971 and was ready to release in 1974, it was released on 26 February 2010. According to Salim Jafer, the distributor of the film in India, he refused to state exactly why it was never released but asserted that "at first there were all sorts of problems and then the producer of the movie, Franklin Fernandes died."

== Plot ==
The story is about a rich, confident, blind young woman married to a photographer. After a necklace is stolen they encounter the villain.

== Cast ==
- Vinod Mehra as Rajesh
- Jaya Bachchan as Jaya
- Shreeram Lagoo
- Sulochana Chatterjee
- Bindu as Rita
- Amrish Puri

== Music ==
The music was by Chetan and lyrics were by Kafil Azhar.

Song	Singer
"Zamana Hain Pyar Ka"	Mohammed Rafi
"Raat Kitni Nasheeli Hai"	Asha Bhosle

== Release ==
Over 200 prints of the film were distributed around India. It was screened at the Liberty Cinema in Fort, Shradha in Dadar and Amar in Chembur.
