= Ikraar =

Ikraar is a 1979 Bollywood film directed by Kailash Advani and starring Rakesh Roshan, Rameshwari, Aruna Irani, Amrish Puri and Surendra Kumar. The film's music is composed by Bappi Lahiri, "Humse Nazar To Milao" became a hit. It earned singer Usha Mangeshkar a nomination at Filmfare Awards for Best Female Playback Singer.

== Soundtrack ==
Lyrics by Kulwant Jani.

- "Sathi Re Gham Nahi Karna" - Savita Suman, Mohammed Rafi
- "Tum Samne Baithe Raho" - Lata Mangeshkar
- "Humse Nazar To Milao" - Usha Mangeshkar
- "Piano Music (Iqraar)"

== Awards ==
Year	Award	Nominee	Work	Result
1980	Filmfare Award for Best Female Playback Singer	"Hamse Nazar To Milao"	Usha Mangeshkar	Nominated
