= Lahu Ke Do Rang (1979 film) =

1979 Hindi film by Mahesh Bhatt

- Film poster
- Directed by: Mahesh Bhatt
- Written by: Suraj Sanim
- Produced by: Seeroo Daryanani; Bhagwan S.C.
- Starring: Vinod Khanna; Shabana Azmi; Danny Denzongpa; Helen
- Cinematography: Pravin Bhatt
- Edited by: Waman Bhosle; Gurudutt Shirali
- Music by: Bappi Lahiri
- Release date: 28 September 1979
- Country: India
- Language: Hindi
- Box office: ₹4,10,00,000 (India Net Collection)

Lahu Ke Do Rang (transl. The two colours of blood) is a 1979 Hindi movie directed by Mahesh Bhatt. This was his first movie as director. The film stars Vinod Khanna, Shabana Azmi, Danny Denzongpa, Helen, Ranjeet. The music and lyrics for the film are by Bappi Lahiri and Farooq Qaiser respectively.

The story, screenplay and dialogues of the film are written by Suraj Sanim. The film was shot in Hong Kong and India. The film was rated a "hit" at the box office.

== Plot ==
Shamsher Singh (Vinod Khanna) is part of the Indian army led by Subhas Chandra Bose to fight the British out of India. When the British pursues him in Hong Kong, he is rescued by Suzy (Helen). Suzy falls in love with him and soon becomes pregnant with his baby. But she lets Shamsher go back to India as he is on a greater mission, after extracting a promise to return.

Back in India, Shamsher is already married to Ladjo (played by Indrani Mukherjee) and they have a son Raj. Shamsher's friends Shankar (Ranjeet) and Mac (Mac Mohan) betray him in connection with a consignment of gold and kill him. But Mac hides the looted gold before he is jailed.

Years later Shamsher's son Raj Singh (Vinod Khanna in double role) joins the police force and is interested in finding the murderers of his father. Mac, who finishes his jail time, is released and is hunted by Shankar (who has changed his name to Devi Dayal) for the looted gold. Mac reveals that the gold is buried in a car that is at the bottom of a deep lake. To fetch the gold, they hire an excellent diver Suraj (Danny Denzongpa). Suraj is the son of Shamsher and Suzy and is angry about how his mother was betrayed by Shamsher who never returned to fetch them back to India as promised.

On his quest to solve a murder case, Raj goes to Darjeeling where he meets Roma (Shabana Azmi) and falls in love with her. Suraj who is also in Darjeeling falls in love with Roma too, but hesitant to communicate. Roma tells Raj of how her mother had been hooked to drugs by Devi Dayal. A series of incidents reveal all the secrets and Raj and Suraj unite to take revenge for their father's death.

== Cast ==
- Vinod Khanna as Shamsher Singh/ Inspector Raj Singh/ Gopi Kathuria (Double Role)
- Shabana Azmi as Roma
- Danny Denzongpa as Suraj Singh
- Ranjeet as Shankar Kathuria/ Devidayal
- Aruna Irani as Supriya Janta Membership Partner
- Helen as Suzy
- Shakti Kapoor as Sujit Suzy's Boyfriend
- Indrani Mukherjee as Laajo Singh
- Goga Kapoor as Goga
- Mac Mohan as Mac
- Prema Narayan as Meena/Anita
- Mohan Sherry as Mohan
- Raj Kumar Kapoor as Dr. Banerjee
- Shammi as Roma's Mother
- R.S.Chopra as Inspector Bhim, colleague of Inspector Raj singh
- Kedarnath Saigal as Manager at Wong's hotel
- Rajan Haskar as Indian embassy officer.
- Manmauji as Roma's servant in Darjeeling
- Baby Shalu as Shabbo
- Master Ravi as young Raj

== Music ==
Composed by Bappi Lahiri, the songs are penned by Faruk Kaiser. Anil Mohile & Arun Paudwal assisted Bappi Lahiri in this movie.

Song	Singer
"Muskurata Hua"	Kishore Kumar
"Chahiye Thoda Pyar"	Kishore Kumar
"Masti Mein Jo Nikli Munh Se Aisi Waisi Baat"	Kishore Kumar, Sulakshana Pandit
"Mathe Ki Bindiya Bole, Kaahe Ko Gori Dole"	Mohammed Rafi, Anuradha Paudwal
"Humse Tum Mile, Tumse Hum Mile"	Chandrani Mukherjee, Danny Denzongpa
"Zid Na Karo" (Female)	Lata Mangeshkar
"Zid Na Karo" (Male)	K. J. Yesudas

== Awards ==
27th Filmfare Awards:

Won

- Best Supporting Actress – Helen
- Best Art Direction – Madhukar Shinde
