= Vinod Mehra =

Indian film actor (1945–1990)

- Born: 13 February 1945; Amritsar, Punjab, British India (present-day Punjab, India)
- Died: 30 October 1990 (aged 45); Bombay, Maharashtra, India
- Occupations: Actor, Producer, Director
- Years active: 1955–1960, 1971–1990
- Spouses: Meena Broca (m. 1974; div. 1978) Bindiya Goswami (m. 1980; div. 1984) Kiran Mehra (m. 1988)
- Children: Soniya Mehra; Rohan Mehra

Vinod Mehra (13 February 1945 – 30 October 1990) was an Indian actor in Hindi films. He started out as a child actor in the mid 1950s, before starting his film career as an adult in 1971. He appeared in over 100 films from the 1970s, until his death in 1990. He was also the producer and director of the film Gurudev which was released in 1993, 3 years after his death.

== Career ==
Mehra made his debut as a child actor in the 1955 film Adl-e-Jehangir at the age of 10. He continued playing minor roles in films such as Raagini (1958) and Bewaqoof (1960), playing the younger version of the character played by Kishore Kumar.

He started his film career as an adult in 1971 with Ek Thi Reeta, a smash hit based on the English play, A Girl Called Rita, along with Tanuja. He was one of finalists in the 1965 All India Talent Contest organised by United Producers and Filmfare from more than ten thousand contestants. He lost the contest to Rajesh Khanna and was the male runner-up of the contest. He was an executive with Goldfield Mercantile Company, until he was the runner-up in the contest. He joined the film industry after being spotted by Roop K. Shorey at Bombay’s Gaylord restaurant.

This was followed by the film Parde Ke Peechey opposite debutant Yogeeta Bali followed by Elaan (with Rekha), Amar Prem (1971) and Lal Patthar, though it was only Shakti Samanta's Anuraag (1973) with Moushumi Chatterjee, which established him as an actor. He went on to appear in over 100 films in a career spanning over two decades. He played lead roles in his earlier films. Later he mostly acted in multi-starrers as a secondary lead or played strong supporting roles such as a brother, friend, uncle, father and police officer. He worked with all top actors like Sunil Dutt, Dharmendra, Sanjeev Kumar, Rajesh Khanna and Amitabh Bachchan. His frequent female co-stars included Rekha, Moushumi Chatterjee, Yogeeta Bali, Shabana Azmi and Bindiya Goswami.

Some of his most prominent films include Nagin, Jaani Dushman, Ghar, Swarag Narak, Kartavya, Saajan Bina Suhagan, Jurmana, Ek Hi Raasta, Ye Kaisa Insaaf, Sweekar Kiya Maine and Khud-Daar. He received Filmfare Nominations as Best Supporting Actor for Anurodh (1977), Amar Deep (1979), and Bemisal (1982). He also played the leading role in a Punjabi film titled Maujaan Dubai Diyaan in 1985.

He became producer and director with the film Gurudev in the late 1980s, starring Sridevi, Rishi Kapoor and Anil Kapoor in the lead roles. He died of a heart attack before the film was completed, at the age of 45 in October 1990. The film was released in 1993, after director Raj Sippy completed the film. Many of his delayed films were released after his death and dedicated to his memory such as Patthar Ke Phool (1991), Insaniyat (1994) and Aurat Aurat Aurat (1996).

Mehra's daughter Soniya Mehra has also appeared in films and his son Rohan Mehra made his acting debut in Nikhil Advani's Baazaar in 2018.

== Personal life and family ==
Mehra was born in 1945, in Amritsar to a Punjabi khatri family. His father was Parameshwaridas Mehra and his mother was Kamala Mehra, who lived in inner city of Amritsar. The family moved its base to Bombay from Amritsar after independence as Parameshwaridas had business interest in Bombay. He had an elder sister named Sharda who appeared in one movie ( Ek ke Bad Ek - 1960 with Dev Anand) before Mehra started his career in 1970s. Mehra completed his education at Sacred Heart Boys High School Santacruz and later earned a Bachelor's degree at St. Xavier's College, Mumbai.

Mehra was close to Rekha in the mid-70s. Indeed, they were widely believed to have been married, but in a 2004 television interview with Simi Garewal, Rekha denied having ever been married to him, and referred to him affectionately as a well-wisher (but in Rekha's unofficial biography The Untold Story by Yasser Usman, it is mentioned that Mehra, Rekha's rumoured husband, took her to his house in Bombay, after getting married in Calcutta, and Vinod's mother pushed the actress away when the latter tried to touch her feet)." Mehra's first marriage to Meena Broca was arranged by his mother. The marriage was reportedly not consummated as Vinod suffered a heart attack shortly after the marriage. After he recovered, he eloped with his frequent leading lady of the time, Bindiya Goswami. Meena was left with no choice but to file for a divorce. Mehra's marriage with Goswami unraveled quickly and she soon divorced him to marry director J. P. Dutta. In 1988, Mehra married Kiran, the daughter of a Kenya-based transport businessman. The marriage lasted until Vinod's death in 1990 and the couple had two children: a daughter named Soniya (born in 1988) and a son named Rohan (born in 1991, after his death). Mehra died of a heart attack on 30 October 1990. He was only 45 years years old.

After Mehra's death, his widow moved to Kenya, to live with her parents and sister. Their children were raised in Mombasa and went to the UK for higher education. Both later entered the film industry. Soniya made her Hindi film debut in the 2007 film Victoria No. 203, a remake of the 1972 classic film of the same name. Rohan made his debut in Nikhil Advani's Baazaar (2018).

== Filmography ==
=== Director and producer ===
- Gurudev (1993)

=== Actor ===
- Adl-E-Jehangir (1955) as Young Khurram
- Patit Pawan (1955)
- Sharada (1957) as Shekhar's Brother
- Duniya Rang Rangeeli (1957) as Street Singer
- Balyogi Upmanyu (1958)
- Raagini (1958) as Young Rajan
- Bewaqoof (1960) as Young Kishore Kumar
- Angulimaal (1960) as Young Ahinsak
- Ek Thi Reeta (1971)
- Parde Ke Peechey (1971) as Rajan
- Elaan (1971) as Naresh Kumar Saxena
- Lal Patthar (1971) as Shekhar
- Amar Prem (1971) as Nandkishore Sharma "Nandu"
- Anuraag (1972) as Rajesh
- Bandgi (1972) as Darpan
- Rani Mera Nam (1972) as CID Inspector Anand (Special appearance)
- Bees Saal Pahele (1972) as Story Listener (Guest appearance)
- Kahani Hum Sab Ki (1973) as Prabhat
- Teen Chor (1973) as Mohan
- Nirdosh (1973) as Ravi
- Hifazat (1973) as Kishore
- Do Phool (1973) as Charitra Kumar Rai "Chuttan"
- Jurm Aur Sazaa (1974) as Ratan
- Aarop (1974) as Ravi
- Kunwara Baap (1974) as Vinod
- Vada Tera Vada (1974) as Vinod
- Ujala Hi Ujala (1974) as Vikram
- Us Paar (1974) as Mohan
- Shaandaar (1974) as Chandar
- Hawas (1974) as Dr. Bali
- Faslah (1974) as Vinod
- Chattan Singh (1974) as Vishal
- Albeli (1974) as Vikas Chandra Verma
- Vardaan (1975) as Mahesh Sharma
- Umar Qaid (1975) as Vinod
- Mazaaq (1975) as Vinod
- Raftaar (1975) as Vikram
- Do Jhoot (1975) as Sanjay
- Neelima (1975)
- Zindagi (1976) as Ajay
- Arjun Pandit (1976) as Tinu-Tina Shukla
- Nagin (1976) as Rajesh
- Sabse Bada Rupaiya (1976) as Amit Rai
- Ginny Aur Johnny (1976) as Mechanic
- Do Khiladi (1976) as Sawan
- Saal Solvan Chadya (1977) as Tony's Uncle
- Tinku (1977) as Rajendra Shah
- Jagriti (1977)
- Duniyadari (1977) as Prakash
- Khel Kismat Ka (1977) as Vinod
- Chaalu Mera Naam (1977) as CBI Officer Chandrashekhar / Raju
- Ooparwala Jane (1977)
- Kali Raat (1977) as Ashok
- Ek Hi Raasta (1977) as Nirmal
- Safed Jhooth (1977) as Vinod Thakur
- Anurodh (1977) as Shreekant
- Ab Kya Hoga (1977) as Kaka's Son (Uncredited)
- Saajan Bina Suhagan (1978) as Anand
- Ghar (1978) as Vikas Chandra
- Swarag Narak (1978) as Vinod
- Chowki No.11 (1978) as Vijay
- Chakravyuha (1978) as Raman
- Aakhri Kasam (1979) as Inspector Ram
- Kartavya (1979) as Ajay Rai / Dushyant
- Jurmana (1979) as Prem Prakash Trivedi
- Jaani Dushman (1979) as Police Inspector / Madman
- Bin Phere Hum Tere (1979) as Raju Sharma / Debu Sharma (Double Role)
- Raakhi Ki Saugandh (1979) as CID Inspector Shankar Verma
- Love in Canada (1979) as Dr. Amit
- Jaandar (1979) as Inspector Raj Kumar Verma "Raju"
- Dada (1979) as Moti / Jeetu
- Amar Deep (1979) as Kishan
- Atmaram (1979) as Madan
- Naya Bakra (1979) as Vinod
- Premikaa (1980) as Vinod
- Kashish (1980) as Mohan
- Badla Aur Balidan (1980) as Deepak
- Saboot (1980) as Vikas
- The Burning Train (1980) as Rakesh
- Takkar (1980) as Vinod / Boss (Double Role)
- Jyoti Bane Jwala (1980) as Inspector Arjun Bakshi
- Jwalamukhi (1980) as Vikram
- Pyaara Dushman (1980) as Inspector Amar
- Zakhmon Ke Nishan (1980) as Shankar
- Yeh Kaisa Insaf (1980) as Ramnath Malhotra "Ram"
- Khoon Kharaba (1980) as Raju
- Saajan Ki Saheli (1980) as Anand
- Ye Rishta Na Tootay (1981) as Ram Kapoor
- Shama (1981) as Dargah Devotee (Special Appearance)
- Chehre Pe Chehra (1981) as David
- Sannata (1981) as CBI Officer Amit Malhotra(Special Appearance)
- Pyaasa Sawan (1981) as Jagannath
- Gehra Zakham (1981) as Vijay
- Kahani Ek Chor Ki (1981) as Shyam / Vilaiti
- Sansani (1981) as Ajay Sachdev
- Professor Pyarelal (1981) as Professor Pyarelal
- Khoon Ki Takkar (1981) as Rajan
- Ustadi Ustad Se (1982) as Sanjay "Sonu"
- Bemisal (1982) as Dr. Prashant Chaturvedi
- Dial 100 (1982) as Gautam
- Khud-Daar (1982) as Rajesh Shrivastav "Raja"
- Lakshmi (1982) as Mohan Saxena
- Shiv Charan (1982) as Charan
- Gopichand Jasoos (1982) as Jeetendra Verma
- Sumbandh (1982) as Prakash Khanna
- Raakh Aur Chingari (1982) as Ashok
- Khushnaseeb (1982) as Vijay Sharma
- Dil Hi Dil Mein (1982) as Vijay Kumar Anand
- Sweekar Kiya Maine (1983) as Kishan Kumar Shukla
- Mehndi (1983) as Gautam
- Kanku Ni Kimat (1983)
- Prem Tapasya (1983) as Ashok
- Naukar Biwi Ka (1983) as Inspector Amarnath
- Shubh Kaamna (1983) as Mr. Mehra
- Laalach (1983) as Kishore
- Chor Police (1983) as Inspector Rohan Sinha
- Yeh Desh (1984) as Salim
- Bindiya Chamkegi (1984) as Shyam Kapoor
- Dharm Aur Qanoon (1984) as Dr. Basheer Khan
- Jeene Nahi Doonga (1984) as Police Inspector
- Zakhmi Sher (1984) as Police Inspector
- All Rounder (1984) as Birju
- Aurat Ka Inteqam (1984) as Dinesh
- Pet Pyar Aur Paap (1984) as Vinod
- Mujhe Shaktee Do (1984) as Suraj
- Ram Tere Kitne Nam (1985) as Aloknath Gupta
- Pyari Behna (1985) as Vinay Verma
- Sanjog (1985) as Narayan's Brother
- Shiva Ka Insaaf (1985) as Ram
- Maujaan Dubai Diyaan (1985) as Chandraprakash
- Ankahee (1985) as Doctor
- Jaal (1986) as Satpal Verma
- Aap Ke Sath (1986) as Ashok
- Mohabbat Ki Kasam (1986) as Dancer / Singer
- Locket (1986) as Rajkumar Anil Pratap Singh / Raja
- Swati (1986) as Satyaprakash
- Aisa Pyar Kahan (1986) as Advocate Deepak Khanna
- Patton Ki Bazi (1986) as Inspector Vinod Saxena
- Inteqaam Ki Aag (1986) as Inspector Kishan
- Preeti (1986)
- Maqaar (1986) as Prashant / Jerry
- Samay Ki Dhaara (1986) as Dr. Vinod Kapoor
- Vishal (1987) as Dr. Tarak
- Pyar Ki Jeet (1987) as Dr. Anand
- Aag Hi Aag (1987) as Dr. Raghuveer Singh
- Satyamev Jayate (1987) as Inspector Mirza
- Aulad (1987) as Vikas "Vicky"
- Woh Milie Thi (1988) as Amar
- Waqt Ki Awaz (1988) as Dr. Shreekant
- Aakhri Adaalat (1988) as Barrister Shreekant Sharma
- Faisla (1988) as CID Inspector Ashok Verma / Bansi
- Mahaveera (1988) as Dharam
- Namumkin (1988) as Shakti Kaul
- Saazish (1988) as Inspector Saxena
- Mar Mitenge (1988) as Inspector Thakur
- Bees Saal Baad (1988) as Inspector Verma
- Vardi (1989) as Police Commissioner Verma
- Meri Zabaan (1989) as Vikram Singh
- Eeshwar (1989) as Ramesh
- Prem Pratigyaa (1989) as Professor
- Shehzaade (1989) as Inspector Shankar Shrivastav
- Mitti Aur Sona (1989) as Inspector Sunil
- Hum Intezaar Karenge (1989) as Ravi
- Matlabi (1989)
- Zimmedaaar (1990) as Inspector Prakash Verma
- Pyar Ka Karz (1990) as Police Commissioner Arun Kumar
- Patthar Ke Phool (1991) as Inspector Vijay Verma
- Shikari (1991) as Chanchal's Father
- Kohraam (1991) as Masterji
- Sarphira (1992) as Advocate Raj Kishan Sinha
- Policewala (1993) as Inspector Prabhakar
- Prateeksha (1993) as Tom D'Costa
- Insaniyat (1994) as Nandu (Delayed release)
- Aurat Aurat Aurat (1996) as Vijay (Delayed release)
- Aatank (1996) as Peter (Delayed release)
- Aahat (2010) as Rajesh (Delayed release)

=== Unreleased films ===
- Dam Maro Dam (1980)
- Barrister (1982)
- Chakma (1984)
- Ek Naya Itihas (1984)
- Kasme Rasme (1986)
- Bonny (1993)
