= Bindiya Goswami =

Former Indian actress (born 1957)

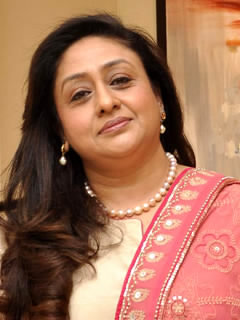
- Bindiya Goswami in 2014
- Born: 6 January 1962 (age 64); Kaman, Rajasthan, India
- Occupation: Actress
- Years active: 1969–1987
- Spouses: Vinod Mehra (m. 1980; div. 1984) J.P. Dutta (m. 1985)

Bindiya Goswami (born 6 January 1962) is an Indian former actress, who is best known for her works in Hindi cinema throughout the 1970s and 1980s.

== Film career ==
Bindiya was discovered at a party, when she was a teenager, by Hema Malini's mother. She felt that Bindiya had a resemblance to Hema and recommended her to film producers. Bindiya's first Hindi film was Jeevan Jyoti opposite Vijay Arora. Though the film flopped, Bindiya forged ahead and met success with director Basu Chatterjee's Khatta Meetha (1977) and Prem Vivah (1979). Her biggest hit was Hrishikesh Mukherjee's comedy film Gol Maal (1979). The success of Dada (1979) led her to sign a number of films with Vinod Mehra. She also bagged a role opposite Shashi Kapoor in the big-budget film Shaan (1980).

=== Career as costume designer ===
Bindiya has taken up designing costumes for female stars such as Rani Mukherjee, Kareena Kapoor and Aishwarya Rai for her husband J.P. Dutta's films, such as Border (1997), Refugee (2000), LOC Kargil (2003) and Umrao Jaan (2007).

== Personal life ==
Bindiya was born in Kaman, Bharatpur (Rajasthan) to Venugopal Goswami, a Tamil Brahmin father, and Dolly, a Catholic mother. Her father was a priest of Vallabh Sampraday and married 2 times in his lifetime. Bindiya was initially married to her frequent co-star Vinod Mehra, but they divorced after four years of marriage. Thereafter, Bindiya gave up her acting career to marry director J.P. Dutta in 1985, with whom she has two daughters, Nidhi and Siddhi. Nidhi, her daughter, is pursuing her mother's dream of becoming an actress.

== Filmography ==
Year	Title	Role	Notes
1969	Chik Mik Bijuli		Assamese movie
1976	Jeevan Jyoti	Laxmi	Discovered by Jaya Chakravartyy
1977	Mukti	Pinky	
1977	Khel Kismet Ka		
1977	Jay Vejay	Princess Padmavati	
1977	Duniyadaari		
1977	Chotaa Baap		
1977	Chala Murari Hero Banne		
1978	Ram Kasam	Champa	
1978	Khatta Meetha	Zarine	
1978	College Girl		
1978	Ankh Ka Tara	Geeta	
1979	Prem Vivah	Deepa	
1979	Muqabla	Champa	
1979	Khandaan	Sandhya	
1979	Jaani Dushman	Shanti	
1979	Jaandaar	Radha	
1979	Golmaal	Urmila	
1979	Dada	Kamini	
1979	Ahsaas	Cameo	
1980	Takkar	Meena	
1980	Shaan	Renu	
1980	Bandish	Shanti	
1980	Khoon kharaba		
1981	Sansani: The Sensation	Nisha	
1981	Sannata	Bindi	Guest appearance
1981	Yeh Rishta Na Tootey	Kiran	
1981	Hotel	Vandana	
1982	Khud-Daar	Manju	
1982	Heeron Ka Chor	Geeta	
1982	Karwat		
1982	Hamari Bahu Alka	Alka	
1982	Aamne Samne	Inspector Jyoti	
1982	Reshma		Punjabi movie
1983	Lalach	Sarita	
1983	Rang Birangi	Cameo	
1983	Mehandi	Gauri	
1983	Chor Police	Mrs. Rohan Sinha	Special appearance
1986	Avinash	Alka	
1987	Vishaal	Chanvi	
1987	Mera Yaar Mera Dushman	Anita	
