= Devara Gudi =

- Soundtrack cover
- Directed by: R. Ramamurthy
- Written by: A. S. Prakasham
- Based on: Puguntha Veedu (Tamil)
- Produced by: R. Ramasheshan; R. Kashi Vishwanathan
- Starring: Vishnuvardhan, Bharathi
- Cinematography: Chittibabu
- Edited by: R. Ramamurthy
- Music by: Rajan–Nagendra
- Production company: Srirama Enterprises
- Release date: 1 March 1975
- Running time: 158 minutes
- Country: India
- Language: Kannada

Devara Gudi is a 1975 Indian Kannada-language drama film starring Vishnuvardhan and Bharathi along with Leelavathi, Manjula and Rajesh. The film was directed and edited by R. Ramamurthy and written by A. S. Prakasham

It was a remake of Tamil film Puguntha Veedu (1972) which was earlier also remade in Telugu as Puttinillu Mettinillu (1973), in Malayalam as Sindhu (1975) and later in Hindi as Teri Kasam (1982).

== Cast ==
- Vishnuvardhan as Sundar
- Bharathi Vishnuvardhan as Suchitra
- Manjula as Vasanthi
- Leelavathi as Sundar and Vasanthi's mother
- Manorama
- Rajesh as Bhaskar
- K. S. Ashwath as Bhaskar and Suchitra's father
- Shivaram as Kitty
- B. Jaya

== Soundtrack ==
Devara Gudi

Soundtrack album by Rajan–Nagendra
- Released: 1974
- Genre: Feature film soundtrack
- Length: 21:07
- Label: Saregama

All the songs are composed and scored by Rajan–Nagendra and written by Chi. Udaya Shankar. The album has five soundtracks. The songs are considered to be evergreen hits and are played frequently across all Kannada FM channels.

Track listing
No.	Title	Lyrics	Singer(s)	Length
1.	"Sree Krishna Janisidha"	Chi. Udaya Shankar	Vani Jayaram	4:07
2.	"Cheluveya Andada"	Chi. Udaya Shankar	S. P. Balasubrahmanyam	4:31
3.	"Kannu Kannu"	Chi. Udaya Shankar	S. P. Balasubrahmanyam, S. Janaki	4:05
4.	"Maamaravello"	Chi. Udaya Shankar	S. P. Balasubrahmanyam	4:48
5.	"Naa Bayasada Bhagya"	Chi. Udaya Shankar	P. B. Sreenivas, P. Susheela	3:36
Total length:				21:07
