= Kumar Gaurav =

Indian film actor (born 1956)

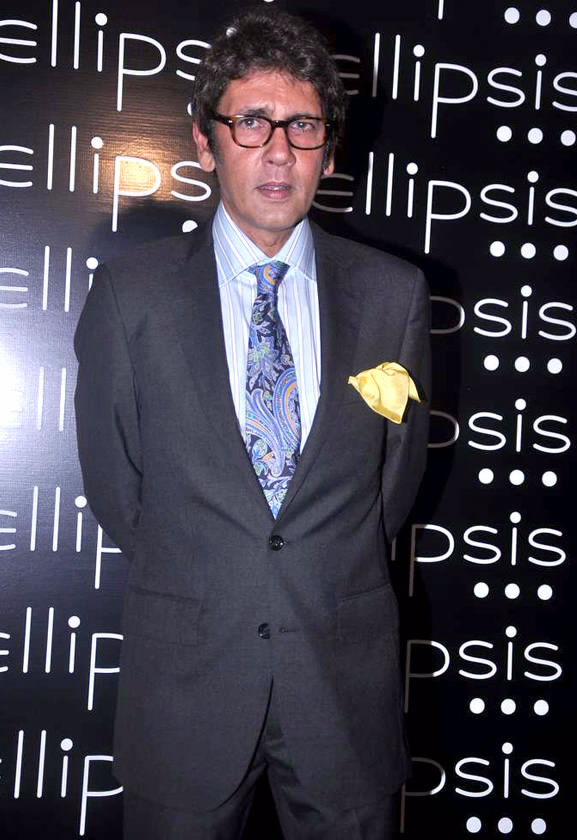
- Gaurav in 2015
- Born: Manoj Tuli; 11 July 1956 (age 70); Lucknow, Uttar Pradesh, India
- Occupations: Actor; businessman
- Years active: 1981–2009
- Spouse: Namrata Dutt (m. 1984)
- Children: 2 daughters Saachi; Siya
- Parent(s): Rajendra Kumar (father); Shukla Behl Tuli (mother)
- Relatives: Sunil Dutt (father-in-law); Nargis (mother-in-law); Sanjay Dutt (brother-in-law); Priya Dutt (sister-in-law)

Kumar Gaurav (born Manoj Tuli; 11 July 1956) is an Indian businessman and former actor who worked in Hindi cinema. Son of actor Rajendra Kumar, Gaurav has appeared in several films such as Love Story, Teri Kasam, Star, Naam and Kaante.

== Early life ==
Kumar Gaurav was born Manoj Tuli to late actor Rajendra Kumar and late Shukla (belonging to the Behl family of Hindi films). He went to Bishop Cotton School, Shimla.

Director Ramesh Behl and Shyam Behl are his maternal uncles. His maternal first cousins include Ravi Behl and Geeta Behl as well as Ramesh's son Goldie Behl.

== Personal life ==
In 1984, he married Namrata Dutt (born 1962), sister of Sanjay Dutt and daughter of Sunil Dutt and Nargis. They have two daughters, Saachi Kumar who is married to producer Kamal Amrohi's grandson Bilal Amrohi and Siya Kumar who is married to Aditya.

== Career ==
Kumar Gaurav made his debut along with Vijayta Pandit in Love Story (1981) directed by Rahul Rawail which was produced by his father who also starred in a supporting role the film. This film was a huge box office hit for its innovative story, the memorable music by Rahul Dev Burman and the fresh leading pair. Many youngsters began to emulate his character in the film. His next film Teri Kasam (1982) with Poonam Dhillon was an average grosser. That same year he starred in the musical Star which failed to do well though its music was popular.

In 1985, Gaurav starred in Mahesh Bhatt's television film Janam. His understated performance is still considered his career's best. In the following year he had his second big box office hit with Mahesh Bhatt's Naam (1986) which was produced by his father and also starred his brother-in-law Sanjay Dutt. Despite the success of Naam, Gaurav's career declined as all of his subsequent films failed to do well at the box office.

His father tried to revive his career with the 1993 film Phool which had him paired with Madhuri Dixit and also starred his father and father-in-law Sunil Dutt in supporting roles but the movie flopped. Gaurav then took a long break from acting (except for two delayed releases in 1996).

In 1999, he made appearances in a few television series. In 2000, he was seen again on the big screen in Gang which had been in production for nearly a decade due to director Mazhar Khan's ill health. In 2002, he played one of the six protagonists in the crime thriller Kaante, directed by Sanjay Gupta (remake of the American cult hit Reservoir Dogs) which became the third-highest-grossing film of the year and remains his last Hindi film to date.

In 2004, he appeared in the American film, Guiana 1838, directed by Rohit Jagessar which tells the story of Indians arriving in British Guiana (present-day Guyana) as labourers during the nineteenth century. In 2006, he starred in the silent film My Daddy Strongest and that remains his last acting role to date.

Kumar Gaurav now runs a construction company.

== Filmography ==
Year	Film	Role	Notes
1981	Love Story	Bunty	
1982	Teri Kasam	Tony/Deepak	
1982	Star	Dev Kumar	
1983	Lovers	Viju	
1983	Romance	Amar	
1984	Hum Hain Lajawab	Pawan Kumar Singh	
1984	All-rounder	Ajay	
1984	Divorce		
1985	Ek Se Bhale Do	Bunty D'Mello	
1985	Janam	Rahul	
1986	Begaana	Anand Mathur / Kailashnath Rana	Dual role
1986	Naam	Ravi Kapoor	
1987	Dil Tujhko Diya	Vijay 'Chhotu' 'Munna' Sahni	
1987	Albela (1987 film)		
1987	Aaj	Akshay	
1989	Goonj	Sanjeev Kamat	
1989	Jurrat	Inspector Avinash	
1991	Hai Meri Jaan	Bunty	
1991	Pratigyabadh	Shakti Yadav	
1991	Indrajeet	Vijay	
1992	Siyasat		
1993	Phool	Karamraj 'Raju' / Gopal	
1996	Muthi Bhar Zameen	Karan	
1996	Sautela Bhai	Shankar	
2000	Gang	Nihal Singh	
2002	Kaante	Anand 'Andy' Mathur	
2004	Guiana 1838		

=== Television ===
Year	Title	Role	Notes
1998	’’X Zone’’	Sikandar	

== Dubbing roles ==
=== Live action films ===
Film title	Actor	Character	Dub Language	Original Language	Original Year release	Dub Year release	Notes
The Jungle Book	Jason Scott Lee	Mowgli	Hindi	English	1994	1995	

== See also ==
- List of Hindi film families
