= Dard (1981 film) =

1981 film

- Poster
- Directed by: Ambrish Sangal
- Written by: Aruna Sangal (story); V K Sharma (screenplay)
- Produced by: Shyam Sunder Shivdasani
- Starring: Rajesh Khanna; Hema Malini; Poonam Dhillon
- Cinematography: Pramod Mittal
- Edited by: Kamlakar Karkhanis
- Music by: Khayyam
- Release date: 14 August 1981
- Country: India
- Language: Hindi

Dard (Pain) is a 1981 Bollywood crime film directed by Ambrish Sangal. Rajesh Khanna, who had a double role in the film, was nominated for a Filmfare Award for Best Actor in 1982 for his performance. The film was successful at the box office and ran to silver jubilee at Mumbai and other centers. Award-winning composer Khayyam composed the music for the film.

== Plot ==
Deepak (Rajesh Khanna) is accused of killing a courtesan, Munnibai, and a trial take place in court. His lover Seema (Hema Malini) appears against him as public prosecutor and gets him life imprisonment. Seema remembers her days with Deepak three years ago, when both were ardent lovers and how she loved him. Both consider themselves as married and united by their souls. Deepak wants to meet Seema and she unwillingly meets him in jail. Deepak explains to her how fate brought him into jail.

Deepak is a lawyer and looks for good opportunities in his career. He has a sister Sushma (Poornima Jayaram), the only family he has left in this world. Seema introduces Deepak to her father, who dislikes their relationship, but pretends to accept them. Seema's father urges her to pursue her law career in America, but she refuses as she does not want to leave Deepak for three years. Deepak persuades her to go ahead and Seema obeys him, hoping to get married after three years. After Seema has left, Seema's father shows Deepak his real face and orders Deepak to go away from Seema and Deepak does not accept. Deepak's sister Sushma has got engaged with a man named Ajit and Deepak arranges for their marriage. Ajit initially behaves well, understanding Deepak's financial position, but turns evil when Seema's father tempts him with money to ask for dowry during their marriage and Ajit does so. Unable to get as much money as Ajit asked for, Deepak goes to Seema's father for help. Seema's father agrees to help him on the condition that he should marry another girl and leave Seema forever. Unwillingly, Deepak accepts for his sister's sake and marries another woman. But his wife dies in a year after giving birth to their son Vicky. Left alone with his child, Deepak's misfortune chases him when Ajit kills a courtesan Munnibai. Deepak takes the blame on himself and lands in jail. Seema understands her father's role behind everything and wants to make an appeal on the verdict, but Deepak stops her. He requests her to take care of his child Vicky and accept him as her son, to which Seema promises.

Seema becomes mother of Vicky and raises him and Deepak spends his life in jail. As years passed, Vicky (Rajesh Khanna) returns from America after completing his studies and Deepak gets released from prison. He does not want Vicky to know that he is his father as he is very unlucky man and his misfortunes should not affect his son. Vicky brings his lover Poonam (Poonam Dhillon) and introduces her to his mother. Deepak gets a job of gardener in Poonam's house and Vicky becomes a successful lawyer, replacing his mother Seema as public prosecutor. Deepak feels happy on seeing his son whenever he visits Poonam's home. Poonam and Vicky get engaged and everything goes smooth until the arrival of Ajit, who is now an evil drunkard. Ajit blackmails Seema that he wishes to meet Vicky and tell about Deepak to him. Seema yields to his blackmail as she does not want to break the promise made to Deepak about exposing the father-son relationship to Vicky. In due course, Ajit is killed and Deepak is accused of killing him. Vicky appears as public prosecutor against him without knowing that he is his father and demands imprisonment for Deepak. Seema appears in defence for Deepak. Seema struggles hard to keep up the promise given to Deepak, but Vicky tests her patience severely.

== Cast ==
- Rajesh Khanna as Ex-Lawyer Deepak Srivastav / Advocate Vikas "Vicky" Srivastav (Double role)
- Hema Malini as Advocate Seema
- Poonam Dhillon as Poonam Bhargav
- Ranjeeta Kaur Munnibai
- Poornima Jayaram as Sushma
- Pinchoo Kapoor as Dwarka Bhargav
- Mazhar Khan as Ajit Saxena
- Shashi Puri
- Om Shivpuri as Dayal
- Shashi Kiran as Police Inspector Sadanand Shukla
- Paidi Jairaj as Jailor Durga Dass

== Music ==
The songs of the film are composed by Khayyam with lyrics written by Naqsh Lyallpuri.

No.	Title	Singer(s)	Length
1.	"Na Jaane Kya Hua, Jo Tune Choo Liya"	Lata Mangeshkar
2.	"Ahl-e-dil"	Lata Mangeshkar
3.	"Aesi Haseen Chandni"	Kishore Kumar
4.	"Qubool Kijiye"	Asha Bhosle
5.	"Pyaar Ka Dard Hai, Meetha Meetha Pyara Pyara"	Asha Bhosle, Kishore Kumar
6.	"Jagmag Jagmag Si Mehfil"	Asha Bhosle, Kishore Kumar
7.	"Ahl-e-dil"	Bhupinder Singh

== Awards ==
- 29th Filmfare Awards (1982) - Rajesh Khanna was nominated in Best Actor category.
