= Mahaanta =

- Theatrical release poster
- Directed by: Afzal Khan
- Written by: Talat Rekhi (dialogues)
- Screenplay by: Afzal Khan
- Story by: Afzal Khan
- Produced by: Ayub Khan
- Starring: Jeetendra; Sanjay Dutt; Madhuri Dixit; Shakti Kapoor; Paresh Rawal
- Cinematography: Anwar Siraj
- Edited by: Prashant Khedekar; Vinod Nayak
- Music by: Laxmikant Pyarelal
- Production company: Ayesha Film
- Release date: 23 May 1997
- Running time: 165 minutes
- Country: India
- Language: Hindi
- Budget: ₹42.5 million
- Box office: ₹95 million

Mahaanta (transl. Eminence) is a 1997 Hindi-language action drama film, produced by Ayub Khan under the Ayesha Film banner and directed by Afzal Khan. It stars Jeetendra, Sanjay Dutt, Madhuri Dixit, Shakti Kapoor and music composed by Laxmikant Pyarelal. Filming began in 1991 and was delayed for 6 years due to Dutt's arrest in 1993 and Dutt and Dixit breaking up their relationship.

== Plot ==
Young Vijay studies in Good Shepherd High School and lives a wealthy lifestyle in a small scenic town along with his uncle, who is the Inspector General of Police in Bombay, and has a close friend called Raj Malhotra. When both mature, Vijay gets married, while Raj marries Shanti. On his uncle's insistence, Vijay departs to live in Bombay, where he eventually becomes the Police Commissioner. Subsequently, Raj, Shanti, and Raj's brother, Sanjay, also relocate to Bombay, where they are united with Vijay. Then Sanjay falls in love with Jenny, and both want to get married, much to the chagrin of Mahesh, who wants to marry her at any and all costs. Mahesh is the only son of wealthy and influential Kedar, who manages to convince Edward that it will be in Jenny's and Sanjay's best interest if Jenny weds Mahesh. The marriage is arranged, but on that very day, Sanjay steps in, humiliates Kedar, and marries Jenny. That night, Sanjay is arrested by none other than Vijay himself and placed in a cell. The next morning, he is released and returns home to find that his brother and sister-in-law are both dead. Sanjay swears to avenge their deaths as well as find out why Vijay betrayed Raj and arrested him on his wedding night.

After learning that Kedarnath killed Sanjay's brother and sister-in-law, Sanjay confronts and challenges him that he will kill him in the same place, but will not remove the evidence. Despite Jenny and Vijay's attempt to stop him, he goes to kill Kedarnath, his son Mahesh, corrupt Inspector P.K. Dubey, and his henchman Nanubhai Chatewala.

Sanjay chases and kills Mahesh on the night of New Year's Eve. Then chases Inspector Dubey in the meat market, then chops him and hangs him to death by a metal hook. Sanjay suddenly learns that Vijay actually put him in jail to save his life and realizes his mistake. He also learns that Kedarnath lured Vijay to get him killed on Ganesh Chaturthi festival, so he reaches there and saves him. And he kills Nanunbhai in hand-to-hand combat.

After killing 3 of them, Sanjay lures Kedarnath to his industry and attempts to kill him in the same places and in the same manner his brother and sister-in-law were killed, but the police force led by Vijay finally comes to stop him. Sanjay's surrender comes to a halt when unconscious Kedarnath wakes up and tries to shoot him. Instead, Vijay gets shot trying to save Sanjay. Sanjay shoots Kedarnath to death. After Vijay recovers, he and Sanjay get emotionally united.

== Cast ==
- Jeetendra as Police Commissioner Vijay Kapoor
- Sanjay Dutt as Sanjay Malhotra
- Madhuri Dixit as Jenny Malhotra
- Mohsin Khan as Raj Malhotra
- Poonam Dhillon as Vijay's wife
- Saeed Jaffrey as Inspector General of Police
- Satyendra Kapoor as Edward Pinto
- Shakti Kapoor as Inspector P.K. Dubey
- Raza Murad as The Narrator
- Amrish Puri as Seth. Kedar Nath
- Paresh Rawal as Nanubhai Chathewala
- Sumalatha as Shanti Malhotra
- Kishore Anand Bhanushali as Avinash , Sanjay's friend
- Tej Sapru as Mahesh Nath
- Snehal Dabi as Kakhil, Sanjay's friend
- Brij Gopal as Kelkar (Informer)
- Shashi Kiran as Sadanand, Sanjay's friend
- Mehmood Jr. as Iqbal, Sanjay's friend
- Tariq Shah as Inspector Aslam Sher Khan
- Gurbachchan Singh as Ujagar

== Soundtrack ==
Music by: Laxmikant-Pyarelal & Lyricist: Anand Bakshi

| # | Title | Singer(s) |
|---|---|---|
| 1 | "Choole Choole" | Alka Yagnik |
| 2 | "Ek Taraf Akeli" | Mohammad Aziz, Alka Yagnik |
| 3 | "Tapka Re Tapka" | Mohammad Aziz, Kavita Krishnamurthy |
| 4 | "Loji Sunoji" | Mohammad Aziz, Alka Yagnik |
| 5 | "Deva O Deva" | Alka Yagnik |
| 6 | "Tere Bin Main Hu Kya" | Amit Kumar, Mohammad Aziz, Kavita Krishnamurthy, Sadhana Sargam |
| 7 | "Mere Yaaron Tum" | Amit Kumar |
| 8 | "Tapka Re Tapka (Duet)" | Mohd Aziz, Kavita Krishnamurthy |
| 9 | "Tapka Re Tapka v2" | Mohd Aziz |
| 10 | "Tapka Re Tapka v3" | Mohd Aziz |
| 11 | "Haan Main Tujhse Pyaar Karti Hoon" | Alka Yagnik, Vinod Rathod |

== Reception ==
A critic from Deccan Herald wrote that "Sanjay looks smashing, thanks to his body-hugging lycra T-shirts, but there's definitely a 'what am I doing in this film` look about him. It's refreshing to see Amrish Puri like he actually looks in real life - minus all those goofy, grotesque getups. Yet, he and the baddies have fallen into a rut. Even the paisa vasool numbers fail to provide relief from booming guns and exploding cars".
