= All Rounder (1984 film) =

- Promotional Poster
- Directed by: Mohan Kumar
- Written by: Mahendra Dehlvi
- Screenplay by: Mohan Kumar
- Produced by: Mohan Kumar
- Starring: Kumar Gaurav; Rati Agnihotri; Vinod Mehra; Shakti Kapoor
- Cinematography: K. K. Mahajan
- Edited by: Pratap Bhatt
- Music by: Laxmikant–Pyarelal
- Production company: Emkay Enterprises
- Release date: 5 April 1984 (India)
- Country: India
- Language: Hindi

All Rounder is a 1984 Indian Hindi-language film directed and produced by Mohan Kumar. It stars Kumar Gaurav and Rati Agnihotri in pivotal roles.

== Plot ==
Vikram Singh (Shakti Kapoor) is the son of a rich businessman. He has hired a coach to practice cricket. He and his friends play cricket in a ground. There Ajay Kumar (Kumar Gaurav), the son of a deceased gardener, is their ballboy. Ajay is passionate about Cricket and requests Vikram to let him play. He tells him that one day he wants to become a cricketer like him. Vikram chides him saying that poor people should stay in their limits and not dream beyond their means. Meanwhile, Ajay's brother Birju (Vinod Mehra), a street performer is the sole bread earner of the family. One day, Ajay plays wearing Vikram's pads and gloves. An angry Vikram thrashes Ajay and throws out his family from their home. Birju and Ajay's mother dies of shock. Birju increases his performances with brand collaboration with roadside shops to earn money, so that Ajay can continue his Cricket practice. After some years, Vikram is now the Opener of Team India. While Ajay is the opener of his University team. Ajay is a flamboyant stroke player who scores only on the Onside. Seeing this brilliance, Ritu, the daughter of the Chairman of Selection Committee, falls in live with Ajay. Vikram wants to marry Ritu but she chooses to be with Ajay. After a string of brilliant performances for his university team, Ajay gets directly selected to play for Team India without having ever played a match of Domestic Cricket. Vikram is dropped from the team for his poor performance and he becomes the 12th Man. During the match, Ajay's massive century wins the match for India and he becomes Man of the Match for which he gets a cheque of 21000, a Bungalow, a Government job and what not. This angers Vikram who had to serve water to Ajay during the match just like Ajay used to do when they were kids. An angry and jealous Vikram sends his girlfriend to Ajay's hotel room. The girl manages to coerce Ajay to come to a bar where Ajay gets drunk and compromising photos are clicked of him which get leaked to the print media. This leads to Ajay being dropped from the team and being admonished by Ritu. Birju bashes Ajay and throws him out of his house. Losing everything overnight, Ajay becomes an alcoholic. The girl realizes her mistake and threatens to expose Vikram's petty plan. So he stabs her. Bleeding, she reaches Ajay and with her last dying declaration, confesses that she and Vikram were in the plot. Ajay and Birju bash Vikram and get him arrested. The movie ends with Ajay becoming a superstar opener for Team India.

== Cast ==
- Kumar Gaurav as Ajay Kumar
- Rati Agnihotri as Ritu
- Vinod Mehra as Birju
- Ramesh Deo as Cricket Boardperson
- Shakti Kapoor as Vikram
- Shubha Khote as Moushiji
- Paintal as Tailor
- Ashalata Wabgaonkar as Ritu's aunt
- Raju Desai as Young Birju
- Sujit Kumar as Ritu's dad
- Yunus Parvez as Cricket Board Chair
- Anuradha Patel as Vikram's Girlfriend
- Shivraj as Manager of vikram property

== Soundtrack ==
Lyrics: Anand Bakshi

#	Title	Singer(s)
1	"O Re Babuaa"	Kishore Kumar, Jaspal Singh
2	"Jaan Jab Jab"	Shabbir Kumar, Lata Mangeshkar
3	"Mere Kurte Mein"	Suresh Wadkar, Alka Yagnik
4	"Panch Unglion Ki"	Amit Kumar, Mahendra Kapoor, Anuradha Paudwal, Alka Yagnik
5	"Hum Kaun Hain"	Suresh Wadkar, Asha Bhosle
6	"O Re Babuaa (Version 2)"	Kishore Kumar
