= Phool (1993 film) =

1993 film by Singeetam Srinivasa Rao

- Poster
- Directed by: Singeetam Srinivasa Rao
- Story by: Singeetam Srinivasa Rao
- Produced by: Rajendra Kumar
- Starring: Sunil Dutt; Rajendra Kumar; Kumar Gaurav; Madhuri Dixit; Shakti Kapoor
- Cinematography: B. C. Gowrishankar
- Edited by: Dimple Behl
- Music by: Anand Milind
- Production company: Aryan Films
- Release date: 30 July 1993
- Country: India
- Language: Hindi

Phool (transl. Flower) is a 1993 Indian Hindi-language film directed by Singeetam Srinivasa Rao starring Kumar Gaurav, Madhuri Dixit in lead roles along with Sunil Dutt, Rajendra Kumar in supporting roles. The film is produced by actor Rajendra Kumar who is the father of Kumar Gaurav, both in real life and in the film. This film marked Rajendra Kumar's final film appearance.

== Plot ==
Dharamraaj and Balram Choudhary are two friends who earn their living by farming. Dharamraaj lives with his mother and son, Raju while Balram lives with his wife Savitri and daughter Guddi. To cement their friendship both fathers fix their children's wedding. This event is blessed by Mouni Baba from the local Shiv Mandir, whose predictions have never been proven wrong. Dharamraaj then goes to Bombay to be a businessman and Raju is sent to a hostel and then to America for further studies.

Years later Dharamraaj informs Balram that the marriage cannot take place. Balram returns home with this news and in shock, his wife Savitri passes away. Romance enters Guddi's life when she meets a journalist named Gopal. Balram disapproves of Gopal meeting Guddi secretly. Gopal promises that he will not meet Guddi again until they are married. When Gopal does not return, Guddi goes to Mouni Baba and is told that Gopal has not been true to her. Gopal then reveals that he is Raju. Guddi swears never to speak with or about Raju or his family again.

Guddi's father then arranges her marriage to a local troublemaker and Raju begins to drink, upset that he has been thrown out of Guddi's life. Balram then has Raju arrested and locked up to prevent him from interfering with the wedding. Dharamraaj turns up at Balram's house to try and save his son and finds out Balram is set to get his daughter married. Raju manages to escape from police custody and abducts Guddi on her wedding day.

After Guddi's fiancée catches up with Raju, a fight ensues and Raju overpowers and takes Guddi to the local temple to get married. Guddi is still not willing to marry him and tells him that she hates him. Raju gives her a gun and tells her if she really does hate him to shoot and kill him. Suddenly, Raju is shot but it is not Guddi who has shot him but a local madman who is also in love with Guddi. Guddi then confesses her love for Raju. Balram and Dharamraaj turn up at the end to save Raju from the bullet wound. In the end, he is saved and he ends up marrying Guddi.

== Cast ==
- Sunil Dutt as Balram Choudhary
- Rajendra Kumar as Dharamraj
- Kumar Gaurav as Raju
- Madhuri Dixit as Guddi
- Shakti Kapoor as Munna
- Akash Khurana as Rajeshwar Dayal
- Maya Alagh as Savitri Choudhary
- Tiku Talsania as Santosh
- Ram Mohan as Lala
- Dina Pathak as Dharamraj's mother
- Raju Shrestha as Daboo
- Babloo Mukherjee as Gopal
- Gurbachan Singh as Police Inspector

== Music ==
The music for the film is composed by Anand Milind while lyrics are penned by Anand Bakshi.

| No. | Title | Singer(s) | Length |
|---|---|---|---|
| 1. | "Phool Phool Pe Bani Teri Tasveer" | Kavita Krishnamurthy, Udit Narayan | 06:56 |
| 2. | "Phool Phool Pe Bani Teri Tasveer (Male)" | Udit Narayan | 01:14 |
| 3. | "Ok Ok" | Udit Narayan | 05:50 |
| 4. | "Sajna O Sajna" | Sadhana Sargam | 06:34 |
| 5. | "Kitna Pyar Karta Hoon" | Kumar Sanu, Sadhana Sargam | 06:35 |
| 6. | "Do Deewane" | Kumar Sanu | 04:52 |
| 7. | "Saal Ke Baarah Mahine" | Kavita Krishnamurthy, Udit Narayan | 09:17 |
