= Jeete Hain Shaan Se =

1988 film by Kawal Sharma

- Poster
- Directed by: Kawal Sharma
- Written by: Abhilash; Raaj Jallandhary
- Produced by: Smt P. Bhagyam
- Starring: Mithun Chakraborty; Sanjay Dutt; Govinda; Mandakini; Vijeta Pandit
- Cinematography: S. Pappu
- Edited by: Vijay Pandey; A. Sanjeevi
- Music by: Anu Malik
- Distributed by: Shree Bhagyalakshmi Movies
- Release date: 15 April 1988
- Country: India
- Language: Hindi
- Budget: ₹ 2 crores
- Box office: ₹ 8 crores

Jeete Hain Shaan Se (translation: We Live with Honor) is a 1988 Indian Hindi-language action film directed by Kawal Sharma. The film stars Mithun Chakraborty, Sanjay Dutt, Govinda, Mandakini, Vijeta Pandit.

== Plot ==
Johny, Govinda and Iqbal are three friends living in a small community in Bombay. Together, they help people in need in their community. As a result, they fall out of favour with the local gangster D.K., who was previously known as Balwant.

Tragedy unfolds when Govinda’s mother passes away. At the funeral, Govinda is reunited with his father, Advocate Verma, who had been missing for years. Shortly thereafter, a police inspector introduces Johny to his biological mother, Mary.

Johny discovers that Advocate Verma was behind the atrocities inflicted on his mother in the past. Consumed by a desire for justice, Johny confronts Verma, igniting a conflict with Govinda, who adamantly defends his father’s innocence. The widening rift between Johny and Govinda threatens their once-strong friendship, creating an opening for D.K. to manipulate their division to further his own agenda.

Amidst the strife, Iqbal takes it upon himself to mediate and restore harmony between Johny and Govinda, striving to thwart D.K.'s plans and safeguard their bond. The story unfolds as the trio navigates their personal conflicts and external threats, exploring themes of friendship, loyalty and the pursuit of justice.

== Cast ==
- Mithun Chakraborty as Johny D'Souza / Himself
- Sanjay Dutt as Govinda Verma
- Govinda as Iqbal Ali
- Mandakini as Julie
- Vijeta Pandit as Kiran
- Danny Denzongpa as Balwant / D.K.
- Satyendra Kapoor as Advocate Verma
- Ashalata Wabgaonkar as Geeta Verma
- Gita Siddharth as Mary D'Souza
- Krishnakant as Rahim Ali
- Yunus Parvez as Advocate Aziz Ahmed
- Gufi Paintal
- Narendra Nath
- Sudhir
- Viju Khote
- Manik Irani as Gullu
- Bhushan Tiwari
- Monty as Dawood
- C. S. Dubey
- Gurbachan Singh as Goga

== Songs ==
The music was composed by Anu Malik. All songs were penned by Indeevar, except "Salaam Seth Salaam Seth" which was penned by Shaily Shailendra.

1. "Julie Julie Johnny Ka Dil Tumpe Aaya" - Kavita Krishnamurthy and Anu Malik
2. "Govinda Govinda" - Shabbir Kumar
3. "Rab Roothe Roothe" - Anuradha Paudwal, Shabbir Kumar and Anu Malik
4. "Salaam Seth Salaam Seth" - Anu Malik
5. "Allah Hoo" - Mohammed Aziz
6. "Jeete Hain Shaan Se" - Amit Kumar, Shailendra Singh, Anuradha Paudwal, Kavita Krishnamurthy and Shabbir Kumar
