= Samundar =

- Theatrical release poster
- Directed by: Rahul Rawail
- Screenplay by: H. M. Mirza
- Dialogues by: Nadira Zaheer Babbar
- Story by: H. M. Mirza
- Produced by: Mushir-Riaz
- Starring: Sunny Deol; Poonam Dhillon; Anupam Kher; Amrish Puri; Roshni; Paresh Rawal
- Cinematography: Baba Azmi
- Edited by: Om Prakash Makkar
- Music by: R. D. Burman
- Production company: M R Productions Pvt. Ltd.
- Distributed by: Mushir-Riaz
- Release date: 3 September 1986
- Country: India
- Language: Hindi

Samundar is a 1986 Indian Hindi-language romantic action film directed by Rahul Rawail and produced by Mushir Riaz. The film stars Sunny Deol, Poonam Dhillon, Anupam Kher, Amrish Puri, Roshni and Paresh Rawal.

== Plot ==
The story begins with an honest police officer, Surajbhan, who is on a mission to bring down a powerful and ruthless smuggler, Raiszada Narsingh. Raiszada, along with his henchman Hansukh, murders the inspector. To cover his tracks, Raiszada frames an innocent man, Rajeshwar Nath, for the crime.

Following the murder, Raiszada takes custody of Surajbhan's young son, Ajit. He raises Ajit and manipulates him with a single-minded goal: to one day seek revenge on Rajeshwar Nath, the man he believes is his father's killer. Raiszada fills Ajit's heart with hatred, preparing him to be a pawn in his long-term plan. Meanwhile, Rajeshwar Nath, who had been imprisoned for a crime he didn't commit, gets released.

As an adult, Ajit is a strong and determined young man. Raiszada tries to steer him towards a beautiful girl named Nisha, who is Rajeshwar Nath's sister-in-law but Ajit falls in love with Anjali.

Rajeshwar Nath is now living under a new identity, Girija Shankar, and is determined to clear his name. However, he now faces not only the villainous Raiszada but also the vengeful wrath of Ajit, who is convinced he is a murderer.

Ajit must now uncover the truth about his father's death and the real identity of the man who has been manipulating him all his life. As he gets closer to Anjali and Rajeshwar Nath, the carefully constructed lies begin to unravel. The story is a dramatic exploration of revenge, the power of deception, and the ultimate triumph of justice and love.

== Cast ==
- Sunny Deol as Ajit
- Poonam Dhillon as Anjali – Ajit’s girlfriend
- Anupam Kher as Rajeshwar Nath / Girija Shankar – Anjali’s brother-in-law
- Amrish Puri as Raizada Narsingh
- Paresh Rawal as Hansukh – Raizada’s right hand man
- Roshni as Nisha – Ajit’s friend
- Navin Nischol as Surajbhan – Ajit’s father
- Anjana Mumtaz as Mrs Girija Shankar – Anjali’s elder sister
- Baby Shahinda Baig as Roma – Girija’s daughter, Anjali’s niece
- Pradeep Rawat as Navy officer

== Music and soundtrack ==
The film’s music was composed by R. D. Burman and the lyrics of the songs were penned by Anand Bakshi.

Among the songs, the duet "Ae Sagar Ki Lehron, Hum Bhi Aate Hain Theharo", sung by Lata Mangeshkar and Kishore Kumar, remains popular. Another song, "Ye Kori Karaari Kanwaari Nazar", was also sung by Kishore Kumar.

| Song | Singer |
|---|---|
| "Yeh Kori Karaari Kanwari Nazar" | Kishore Kumar |
| "Ae Sagar Ki Laheron, Hum Bhi Aate Hain, Thehro" | Lata Mangeshkar, Kishore Kumar |
| "Us Din Mujhko Bhool Na Jana, Jis Din Mujhse Ji Bhar Jaye" | Lata Mangeshkar, Kishore Kumar |
| "Rang-E-Mehfil Badal Raha Hai" | Asha Bhosle |
| "Tum Dono Ho Kitne Achhe" | Gurpreet Kaur, Bhavna Dutta |
