= Naam (1986 film) =

- Poster
- Directed by: Mahesh Bhatt
- Written by: Salim Khan
- Produced by: Kumar Gaurav
- Starring: Nutan; Kumar Gaurav; Sanjay Dutt; Poonam Dhillon; Amrita Singh; Paresh Rawal
- Cinematography: Pravin Bhatt
- Edited by: David Dhawan
- Music by: Laxmikant–Pyarelal
- Distributed by: Aryan Films
- Release date: 12 September 1986
- Running time: 170 minutes
- Country: India
- Language: Hindi

Naam (transl. Name) is a 1986 Indian Hindi-language crime thriller film directed by Mahesh Bhatt, starring Nutan, Kumar Gaurav, Sanjay Dutt, Poonam Dhillon, Amrita Singh, and Paresh Rawal. The film was a major commercial success and is regarded a milestone in the careers of Mahesh Bhatt, Paresh Rawal and Sanjay Dutt. "Chithi Aayi Hai" from the film was selected as one of the 100 songs of the millennium by BBC Radio worldwide.

== Plot ==
Janki Kapoor and her two sons Ravi and Vicky come from a poor family and have difficulty making ends meet.

To add to this burden, the family has to consider the waywardness of Vicky, who is always getting into trouble with the law. Ravi, on the other hand, is a hard-working, responsible son who earns for the family, but also makes sacrifices for Vicky. Vicky is determined to get a job in Dubai as he has heard of thousands of Indians making a successful living there.

Ravi arranges for Vicky's visa and the money to go Dubai. Once in Dubai, the Kapoors receive no word from him. Vicky has encountered problems in Dubai, as he was cheated out of a job, and his visa was obtained fraudulently. In order to remain in Dubai, he must work for ruthless international smuggler Rana, and must earn his keep or be turned over to the authorities, which eventually leads to Vicky's death by Police with Ravi watching and brothers consoling each other while the film ends.

== Cast ==
- Nutan as Janaki Kapoor
- Kumar Gaurav as Ravi Kapoor
- Sanjay Dutt as Vicky Kapoor
- Poonam Dhillon as Seema Rai
- Amrita Singh as Rita
- Paresh Rawal as Rana
- Rakesh Roshan as Himself (Guest appearance)
- Akash Khurana as Aftab Ahmed
- Ram Mohan as Babu Pakett
- Ashutosh Gowariker as Jai Singh Rao Kalewar, a taxi driver
- Mohan Sherry as Narayan
- Purnima as Ravi and Vicky's grandmother
- Pankaj Udhas as Himself (Guest appearance in the song "Chiththi Aayi Hai")
- Gurbachan Singh as Narayan's man
- Ghanshyam Rohera as Mr. Ghanshyam
- Shehnaz Anand as Mrs. Neetu Ghanshyam
- Rita Rani Kaul as Mrs. Saira A. Ahmed

== Soundtrack ==
The film's soundtrack was composed by Laxmikant–Pyarelal, with lyrics penned by Anand Bakshi.

- "Chithi Aayi Hai, Aayi Hai, Chitthi Aayi Hai" was listed at #12 on Binaca Geetmala annual list 1986
- "Ameeron Ki Shaam Gareebon Ke Naam" was listed at #26 on Binaca Geetmala annual list 1986
- "Tu Kal Chala Jayega" was listed at #35 on Binaca Geetmala annual list 1986

=== Track listing ===
Song	Singer	Ref
"Veriya Ve Kiya Kya Kasoor Maine"	Lata Mangeshkar	
"Chithi Aayi Hai, Aayi Hai, Chitthi Aayi Hai"	Pankaj Udhas, Sukhwinder Singh	
"Tu Kal Chala Jayega" (Duet)	Manhar Udhas, Mohammed Aziz	
"Tu Kal Chala Jayega" (Solo)	Mohammed Aziz	
"Ameeron Ki Shaam Gareebon Ke Naam"	Mohammed Aziz	
"Tere Dil Ki Tu Jaane"	Kavita Krishnamurthy	

== Reception ==
Naam opened to critical acclaim for its storyline, Dutt's performance and music and emerged a superhit as well as one of the top-earning Hindi films of 1986. It was Bhatt's return to commercial filmmaking after years of directing art-house films, such as Arth (1982) and Saaransh (1984).
