= Mohabbat (1985 film) =

1985 Indian film by Bapu

- Poster
- Directed by: Bapu
- Story by: K. Bhagyaraj
- Based on: Thooral Ninnu Pochchu (1982) by K. Bhagyaraj
- Produced by: Indra Kumar; Ashok Thakeria
- Starring: Anil Kapoor; Vijayta Pandit
- Edited by: N. Chandra
- Music by: Bappi Lahiri
- Production company: Maruti International
- Release date: 14 June 1985
- Country: India
- Language: Hindi

Mohabbat is a 1985 Indian Hindi-language romantic drama film directed by Bapu. The film stars Anil Kapoor and Vijayta Pandit. It is a remake of the 1982 Tamil film Thooral Ninnu Pochchu.

== Plot ==
Shekhar is in love with Roopa and would like to marry her. Roopa is the only daughter of Choudhury, the apple of his eye, and he agrees to get her married to Shekhar. Shekhar informs his parents, his dad, and his stepmother, and together they all go to Choudhury's house to finalize the marriage. At this point, Shekhar's stepmother asks for a hefty sum as dowry, which the Choudhury is unable to afford, and thus the proposal for marriage falls flat, with the Choudhury vowing that he will get his daughter married elsewhere. Shekhar is disgusted with his stepmother, and leaves home and comes to Choudhury and attempts to convince him to reconsider, but Choudhury is adamant, and goes ahead to plan his daughter's marriage with Atmaram, leaving both Shekar and Roopa devastated, and unsure what plan of action to adopt.

== Cast ==
- Anil Kapoor as Shekhar
- Vijayta Pandit as Roopa Chaudhary
- Shakti Kapoor as Atmaram
- Aruna Irani as Shakuntala Chaudhury
- Amrish Puri as Chaudhary
- Amjad Khan as Gama Pehalwan
- Shammi as Chaudhary's Mother
- Shubha Khote as Shekhar's Stepmother
- Ram Mohan as Shekhar's Father
- Satish Kaushik as Monto
- Sunder as Pandit
- Huma Khan as Gama Pahelwan dead wife

== Production ==
The producer Indra Kumar initially wanted to make a film inspired by Teesri Manzil (1966), with Anil Kapoor starring. Kapoor refused the offer and instead suggested remaking the Tamil film Thooral Ninnu Pochchu (1982); this led to the creation of Mohabbat.

== Soundtrack ==
The music is composed by Bappi Lahiri with lyrics penned by Indeevar.

Song	Singer
"Mehbooba Payi Hai Maine Kaise"	Kishore Kumar
"Sanson Se Nahi"	Kishore Kumar
"Zindagi Mein Pehla Pehla Tune Mujhko Pyar Diya Hai"	Kishore Kumar, Asha Bhosle
"Apni Laila Ko Jo Pyar Nahin Payega"	Kishore Kumar, Amit Kumar
"Naina Yeh Barse, Milne Ko Tarse"	Lata Mangeshkar
