= Baseraa =

- Directed by: Ramesh Talwar
- Written by: Gulzar; Leela Phansalkar; G. R. Kamat
- Produced by: Ramesh Behl
- Starring: Shashi Kapoor; Raakhee; Rekha; Raj Kiran; Poonam Dhillon
- Cinematography: Peter Pereira
- Edited by: Nand Kumar
- Music by: R. D. Burman
- Release date: 1981
- Running time: 2h 14min
- Country: India
- Language: Hindi

Baseraa is a 1981 Bollywood film directed by Ramesh Talwar. Produced by Ramesh Behl, the film is based on a Marathi novel by Leela Phansalkar. It stars Shashi Kapoor, Raakhee, Rekha, Raj Kiran, Poonam Dhillon in lead roles. The music was composed by R. D. Burman.

In the film, Raakhee plays a woman returning to her family after living in a mental asylum for 14 years. The film features the song "Jahan Pe Savera Ho", written by her husband Gulzar.

Baseraa was remade in Telugu as Thodu Needa (1983), in Tamil as Kanmaniye Pesu (1986), in Malayalam as Nirabhedangal (1987) and in Kannada as Suvvi Suvvalaali (1998).

== Plot ==
Purnima and Balraj Kohli are a happily married middle-aged couple, living in a rich neighborhood of Pune. They have two sons, Sagar and Babbu. Sagar falls in love with medico Sarita and they get engaged. It is revealed that Purnima is Balraj's second wife and not the biological mother of Sagar. Balraj is the husband of Sharada, Purnima's elder sister. When the newly married Purnima had lost her husband in an accident, a shocked Sharada fell down the stairs, damaging her head. She is in a mental institution in Mumbai for the past 14 years. Over the years, with no hopes of Sharada's recovery, Balraj and Purnima married.

When Sharada gets hit on her head by an inmate of the institution, she suddenly comes out of her coma. While the doctor explains to her that she was in a comatose state for the past 14 years but does not reveal that Balraj and Purnima are married. As Sharada heads home, alerted by the doctor, Purnima arranges everything to look like it was 14 years ago, making herself up like a widow, and sending Babbu to stay with Sarita. Balraj is happy to see Sharada recovered but sad to see Purnima in a widow's attire. They maintain things in that way for some time for fear that Sharada will fall ill again if she learns the truth.

When Purnima's son Babbu escapes from Sarita's hostel, the truth is revealed to Sharada. Shocked, she loses consciousness and becomes violent on regaining it. Balraj and Purnima are forced to send her back to the mental institution. Sarita, while trying to pacify her, realizes that Sharada is play acting to be crazy to exit from her family. Sharada extracts a promise from her to keep it secret.

== Cast ==
- Shashi Kapoor as Balraj Kohli
- Raakhee as Sharda Kohli
- Rekha as Purnima Kohli
- Raj Kiran as Sagar Kohli
- Poonam Dhillon as Sarita Sethi
- A. K. Hangal as Sharda and Purnima's father
- Iftekhar as Doctor Gokhle
- Master Vikas as Babbu
- Sudha Chopra as Mrs. Sethi
- Mrs. H.F. Mistry as ladies hostel matron
- Raj Kumar Kapoor as Dr. Gupta
- Gulshan Bawra as Mukul

== Music ==
The score was composed by R. D. Burman. The lyrics were penned by Gulzar. Songs were sung by Lata Mangeshkar, Asha Bhosle and Kishore Kumar.

Song	Singer
"Jahan Pe Savera Ho"	Lata Mangeshkar
"Jane Kaise Beetegi Yeh"	Lata Mangeshkar
"Sanware Sunao Bansuri"	Lata Mangeshkar
"Tumhe Chhodke Ab Jeene Ko Ji To Nahin"	Kishore Kumar, Asha Bhosle
"Chup Chap, Chup Chap"	Asha Bhosle
"Aaungi Ek Din, Aaj Jaun"	Asha Bhosle

== Awards ==
29th Filmfare Awards:

Nominated

- Best Film – Rose Movies
- Best Director – Ramesh Talwar
- Best Actress – Raakhee
- Best Lyricist – Gulzar for "Jahaan Pe Savera"
- Best Story – Leela Phansalkar
