= Dil Tera Aashiq =

1993 film by Lawrence D'Souza

- Film poster
- Directed by: Lawrence D'Souza
- Written by: Reema Rakeshnath
- Produced by: Rakesh Nath
- Starring: Salman Khan; Madhuri Dixit
- Music by: Nadeem-Shravan
- Production company: NH Studioz
- Release date: 22 October 1993
- Running time: 151 minutes
- Country: India
- Language: Hindi

Dil Tera Aashiq (English: Heart is your lover) is a 1993 Indian Bollywood romantic comedy film directed by Lawrence D'Souza. The film stars Salman Khan and Madhuri Dixit in pivotal roles. This film is loosely based on the 1892 American play Charley's Aunt. The film released on 22 October 1993 along with another Salman Khan starrer Chandra Mukhi.

== Synopsis ==
Thakur Ranvir Singh Chaudhary is a rich and influential man in his town. He doted on his only sister, Radha, but never forgave her for marrying a poor man. After Radha's death, the responsibility of looking after the children, Vijay, Bittu, and Gudiya, falls on his shoulders. Soniya is a young girl desperately looking for a job to support her sick mother. She decides to masquerade as an elderly woman, Savitri Devi, to get the job of a governess for Bittu and Gudiya. She also starts working as a dance instructor to earn extra money. Vijay teaches at the same school, and the two fall in love. Meanwhile, Thakur, a confirmed bachelor, is also drawn towards Savitri Devi. His friend Naseeb Kumar helps him in his efforts to win Savitri Devi's affection.

Pratap Singh is a dishonest businessman whose factory was shut down by Thakur. He tries to force Thakur into signing the papers that will enable him to reopen his factory. He finds out about Sonia's secret and tries to blackmail her to get Thakur's signature. His move fails, and Sonia tells Vijay and Naseeb Kumar everything. Pratap then makes an anonymous phone call to Thakur and tells him about Sonia's secret and how Vijay and Kumar are in on it. Thakur finds the papers that Pratap gave Sonia in Savitri Devi's cupboard and believes that they were all trying to trick him. He confronts them and throws them out of his house without giving them a chance to explain. Pratap then kidnaps Thakur. But Vijay, Sonia, and Kumar rescue him and are reunited in the end. However, this film has an incomplete ending when Vijay recovers from the bullet shot in his arm and comes home to meet his uncle Takur. Takur realizes that his behavior towards his sister was wrong and meets Vijay, embraces him, and asks him where Sonia is, to which he replies, and then the ending credits are shown.

== Cast ==
- Salman Khan as Vijay Singh
- Madhuri Dixit as Sonia Khanna / Savitri Devi
- Anupam Kher as Thakur Ranbir Singh Chaudhary
- Kader Khan as Naseeb Kumar
- Anil Kapoor as Himself
- Asrani as Natwar Lal
- Tej Sapru as Pratap Singh
- Shakti Kapoor as Black Eye
- Mangal Dhillon Mr James
- Yunus Parvez as Professor
- Deepak Tijori as Announcer
- Guddi Maruti as Passenger in train
- Anjana Mumtaz as Mrs. Khanna
- Aparajita Bhushan as Vijay's Mother
- Piloo Wadia as Mrs. Lobo
- Raja Duggal as Household Servant
- Shashi Kiran as Baba Sadanand Govarnath's Deputy
- Ghanshyam Rohera as Baba Mishra Govarnath's Deputy

== Soundtrack ==
Dil Tera Aashiq

Soundtrack album by Nadeem-Shravan
- Released: 1993
- Recorded: 48:12
- Genre: Feature film soundtrack
- Label: Tips Music Films
- Producer: Nadeem-Shravan

Nadeem-Shravan chronology
Sainik (1993)	Dil Tera Aashiq (1993)	Tadipaar (1993)

The soundtrack was very popular, especially the title track.

All lyrics are written by Sameer; all music is composed by Nadeem-Shravan.

No.	Title	Playback	Length
1.	"Kam Se Kam Itna Kaha Hota"	Alka Yagnik, Mukul Agarwal	5:55
2.	"Dil Tera Aashiq (Raga Maru Bihag)"	Kumar Sanu, Alka Yagnik	5:06
3.	"Humse Sajna Kyun Ruthe" (Male)	S.P. Balasubramaniam	5:54
4.	"Namaste Namaste"	Vinod Rathod, Alka Yagnik	6:10
5.	"Mujhe Kuch Kehna Hai"	Sudesh Bhosle, Sadhana Sargam	8:15
6.	"Pyaasa Kuen Ke Paas"	Udit Narayan	5:06
7.	"Pyar Ke Badle Pyar Milega"	Kumar Sanu, Alka Yagnik	5:40
8.	"Humse Sajna Kyun Ruthe" (Female)	Alka Yagnik	5:53
Total length:			48:12
