= Puguntha Veedu =

- Poster
- Directed by: Pattu
- Written by: A. S. Prakasam
- Produced by: G. Subramania Reddiar
- Starring: A. V. M. Rajan; Ravichandran; Savitri; Lakshmi; Chandrakala
- Cinematography: D. Rajagopal
- Edited by: R. Vittal
- Music by: Shankar–Ganesh
- Production company: Sri Navaneetha Films
- Release date: 13 April 1972
- Country: India
- Language: Tamil

Puguntha Veedu (transl. In-law's house) is a 1972 Indian Tamil-language drama film directed by Pattu in his debut and written by A. S. Prakasam. The film stars A. V. M. Rajan, Ravichandran, Savitri, Lakshmi and Chandrakala. It was released on 13 April 1972 and became a success. The film was remade in Telugu as Puttinillu Mettinillu (also directed by Pattu), in Kannada as Devara Gudi, in Malayalam as Sindhu and in Hindi as Teri Kasam.

== Cast ==
- A. V. M. Rajan
- Ravichandran
- Savitri
- Lakshmi
- Chandrakala
- A. Sakunthala (guest appearance)
- Manorama
- Angamuthu
- V. S. Raghavan
- Cho
- Oru Viral Krishna Rao

== Production ==
Sivakumar was to play the role that Ravichandran eventually played. It is the directorial debut of Pattu. During the filming of one scene, the producer Subramaniam slapped Rajan who then informed Sivaji Ganesan, who was shooting for another film in the same studio; in revenge he reprimanded and slapped Subramaniam.

== Soundtrack ==
The music was composed by Shankar–Ganesh.

Track listing
No.	Title	Lyrics	Singer(s)	Length
1.	"Kannan Pirantha"	Vaali	P. Susheela
2.	"Senthamaraiye"	Vichitra	A. M. Rajah, Jikki
3.	"Naan Unnai"	Vaali	P. Susheela
4.	"Maadi Veettu Ponnu"	Vaali	T. M. Soundararajan

== Release ==
Puguntha Veedu was released on 13 April 1972. The film became a major success, with a 100-day run in theatres.

== Critical reception ==
Vaiyai Chezhian of Theekkathir praised the acting of star cast particularly Savitri but criticised the characterisation of Lakshmi and also panned the film for promoting male chauvinism and speaking against women empowerment.
