= Roohi (1981 film) =

- Poster
- Directed by: S.U. Syed
- Screenplay by: S.L. Manhar
- Story by: Fatima Saiyed
- Produced by: M.G. Sarna; Navin Kapur
- Starring: Zarina Wahab; Mazhar Khan; Asha Sachdev; Sudhir Dalvi
- Music by: Manoj–Gyan
- Production company: Traditional Films
- Release date: 27 February 1981
- Running time: 135 minutes
- Country: India
- Language: Hindi

Roohi is a 1981 Indian Hindi-language film directed by S.U. Syed, starring Zarina Wahab and Mazhar Khan.

== Plot ==
Vijay, a wealthy young man who has a wealthy lifestyle as well, lives with his uncle in Delhi. Vijay, a canvas painter, has a vision in his dream of the woman he is going to marry, paints her on his canvas, and takes it along with him to Kandaghat, Himachal Pradesh, to visit a close friend, Prakash. Vijay stays at Prakash's palatial home, which he shares with his girlfriend, Shalu. A few days later Vijay meets a village belle, Sajjo, who looks the same as the image he painted, that of his dream-girl and they fall in love with each other. Vijay calls her 'Roohi'. But Vijay doesn't know that Sajjo has two other passionate admirers, Sangha – who dreams of marrying Sajjo at any cost and the second is Prakash himself...Will Vijay-Roohi's love succeeds form the climax.

== Cast ==
- Zarina Wahab as Sajjo / Roohi
- Mazhar Khan as Vijay
- Asha Sachdev as Shalu
- Mukesh Khanna as Prakash
- Asif Akbar as Vijay's uncle
- Sudhir Dalvi as Rahim
- Uma Dhawan
- Heena Kausar as Champa – Sajjo's friend
- Mushtaq Merchant
- Meena Rai as Devi Maa
- Girija Shankar as Sangha
- Prithvi Soni

== Songs ==
1. "Tuhi Tuhi Meri Roohi" – Suresh Wadkar, Alka Yagnik
2. "Sajna Mujhko Roohi Kahke Bulaaye" – Asha Bhosle/Alka Yagnik
3. "Khoobsurat Tera Chehra" – Suresh Wadkar
4. "Jeete The Jiske Dam Se" – Manhar Udhas
5. "Badi Der Ki Meherban" – Lata Mangeshkar
6. "Badi Der Ki Meherban(II)" – Lata Mangeshkar
