= Deewana Tere Naam Ka =

1987 Hindi film directed by Deepak Bahry

- Promotional Poster
- Directed by: Deepak Bahry
- Produced by: Gautam Bhatia
- Starring: Mithun Chakraborty; Vijayeta Pandit; Danny Denzongpa
- Music by: Raamlaxman
- Release date: 4 September 1987
- Running time: 140 minutes
- Country: India
- Language: Hindi

Deewana Tere Naam Ka is a 1987 Indian Hindi romantic drama film directed by Deepak Bahry, starring Mithun Chakraborty, Vijayeta Pandit, Danny Denzongpa, Jagdeep and Sharat Saxena.

== Plot ==
This is a love tringle story of two friends Shankar and Shambhu. They both fall in love with Reshma but she decides to marry Shankar. Being angry Shambhu breaks off their friendship and challenges their relationship.

== Cast ==
- Mithun Chakraborty as Shankar
- Vijayeta Pandit as Reshma
- Danny Denzongpa as Shambhu
- Jagdeep as Dilip Devraj Ghayal Shikarpuri
- Seema Deo as Shankar's foster mother
- Kamal Kapoor as Thakur
- Yunus Parvez as Munim
- Sharat Saxena as Munim's adopted son
- Huma Khan as dancer
- Leena Das as dancer / singer
- Jayshree T. as dancer / singer

== Songs ==
Song	Singer
"Deewana Tere Naam Ka"	Shabbir Kumar
"Haseen Hum, Jawan Tum"	Mahendra Kapoor, Usha Mangeshkar, Dilraj Kaur
"Ek Taraf Hai Apni Yaari"	Shailendra Singh, Ashok Khare
"Ek Taraf Hai Apni Yaari (Sad)	Ashok Khare
"Ae Sharmana Chhod De"	Asha Bhosle, Ashok Khare
"Aise Mara Thumka"	Asha Bhosle
