= Vijayta Pandit =

Indian actress and singer (born 1967)

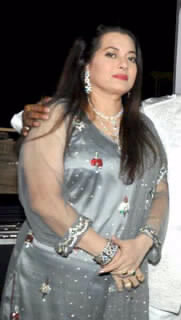
- Pandit in May 2013
- Born: Vijayta Pratap Narayan Pandit; 1962 (age 63–64); Mumbai, Maharashtra, India
- Occupations: Actress, singer
- Years active: singing: 1977–present acting: 1981–1990
- Spouse: Aadesh Shrivastava (m. 1990; died 2015)
- Children: Avitesh Shrivastava, Anivesh Shrivastava
- Family: Jatin–Lalit (brothers), Sulakshana Pandit (sister)

Vijayta Pandit is an Indian actress and playback singer, most famous for her first film Love Story (1981).

== Early life and background ==
Vijayta comes from a musical family originating in Pili Mandori Village in Hissar district of Haryana state. Pandit Jasraj is her uncle. Her elder sister was Sulakshana Pandit, and like her, is an actress and playback singer. Her brothers are music directors Jatin Pandit and Lalit Pandit, better known as Jatin–Lalit.

== Career ==
Rajendra Kumar cast her alongside his son Kumar Gaurav in Love Story (1981), which became a "blockbuster" at the box office. She and Gaurav played star-crossed lovers, and they also developed a relationship off-screen. Though the film became a hit, her career did not take off for various reasons. Their relationship too ended due to family tensions. She blamed Rajendra Kumar for the gap in her film career.

Vijayta came back to movies a few years later with Mohabbat (1985) which turned out to be a decent hit. She was briefly married to Sameer Malkan who had directed her in Car Thief (1986). Films where Vijayta played the lead include Jeete Hain Shaan Se (1986), Deewana Tere Naam Ka (1987), Zalzala (1988), Pyar Ka Toofan (1990). She also starred in the blockbuster Bengali film Amar Sangi . (1987) directed by Sujit Guha along with Prasenjit. She has also sung a song for the Bengali movie Biyer Phool.

After marrying composer Aadesh Shrivastava she quit acting and concentrated on playback singing. She has sung for films such as Jo Jeeta Wohi Sikandar (1992), Kabhi Haan Kabhi Naa (1993), Saazish (1998), Dev (2004) and Chingaari (2006).

Aadesh Shrivastava produced a pop album titled Propose – Pyaar ka Izhaar which marked Vijayta's debut as a pop singer. Madhuri Dixit launched the album for the press in February 2007.

== Filmography ==
Year	Title	Role	Language	Notes
1971	Door Ka Raahi		Hindi	Child Artist
1976	Sankoch	Young Lalitha	Hindi	
1981	Love Story		Hindi	Debut In Lead Role
1985	Misaal		Hindi	
1985	Mohabbat		Hindi	
1985	Wafadaar		Hindi	
1987	Amar Sangee		Bengali	
1987	Mit Jayenge Mitane Wale		Hindi	
1987	Deewana Tere Naam Ka		Hindi	
1988	Afsar		Hindi	
1988	Som Mangal Shani		Hindi	
1988	Aag Ke Sholay		Hindi	
1988	Zalzala		Hindi	
1988	Jeete Hain Shaan Se		Hindi	
1990	Naag Nagin		Hindi	
1990	Wafaa		Hindi	
1990	Pyaar Ka Toofan		Hindi	
1990	Kasam Dhande Ki		Hindi	
1991	Car Thief		Hindi	
1996	Waqt Ka Sikandar		Hindi	
