= Yuddha Kaanda =

- Directed by: K. V. Raju
- Screenplay by: K. V. Raju (also dialogues)
- Based on: Meri Jung (Hindi)(1985)
- Produced by: C. Rajkumar
- Starring: Ravichandran; Poonam Dhillon; Bharathi Vishnuvardhan; Shashi Kumar
- Cinematography: J.G. Krishna
- Edited by: Shyam Yadav
- Music by: Hamsalekha
- Production company: Raj Rohit Combines
- Release date: 9 January 1989
- Running time: 142 minutes
- Country: India
- Language: Kannada

Yuddha Kaanda (transl. The War Chapter) is a 1989 Indian Kannada-language film directed by K. V. Raju, starring Ravichandran, Poonam Dhillon and Bharathi Vishnuvardhan. The film remains Dhillon's only Kannada film till date. It is a remake of the 1985 Hindi film Meri Jung.

Upon release, the movie received positive reviews and became one of the highest-grossing films of the year after movies like Nanjundi Kalyana and Indrajith. The movie had a theatrical run of 16 weeks.

== Plot ==
Bramhavar, a common man is trapped in a murder case, where J.D Patil, a famous Adv. proves him guilty, and is sentenced to be hanged by the court. Sharadha Devi, Bramhavar's wife tries to convince Patil to be truthful and spare Bramhavar, but Patil asks her to provide evidence of his innocence, to which she sadly quotes: One who does not have any proof or witness of innocence, are they not innocent? Patil was determined to let Bramhavar receive the death sentence. Bramhavar is hanged as per the court's decision, and Sharadha being shocked by the event, becomes mentally unstable and is sent to a mental institution.

Adv. Gupta, who defended Brahmavar, finds out that Patil knew that Bramhavar was innocent, but only wanted him to be hanged, and later reveals the injustice to Bramhavar's son Ravi. Bramhavar's house is auctioned off by the court, where Ravi and his sister Asha are not offered help. Ravi becomes a successful defence lawyer and keenly follows Patil's cases so that he can stand up in court against the undefeated Patil and defeat him in court. One day, Sunitha meets Ravi and asks him to fight the case of her brother, Dr. Sanjay, who is accused of killing a patient on duty with his medicine, which she provided from her purse. Ravi refuses to take her case, telling her to fetch evidence to prove Sanjay's innocence, to which Sunitha replies with the same quote which Sharadha said to Patil.

Ravi is reminded of Sharadha's pleadings before Patil, where he is convinced to take the case. Ravi meets Sanjay in police custody, who reveals that he got a call from her ward assistant that her patient is in the ICU and needs him. Sanjay stops on the way (due to a traffic jam), and he impatiently moves out of his car to ask the reason. Meanwhile, somebody replaces the medicine bottle with the look-alike bottle of poison from his purse. On arrival in the hospital, he gives the liquid from that bottle to stabilise the patient, which resulted in the patient's death. Before asking Ravi for help, Sunitha had gone to meet Patil and had asked him to fight Sanjay's case, but Patil denies claiming that he is very busy at the moment, but later tells his assistant that there is no way that this case could be won.

Ravi asks Sanjay about the nature of poison and for how long a person can sustain the poison; he learns that poison might result in death within 2 to 15 minutes depending on the body's resistance. The case begins with the prosecution lawyer recounting the events and telling that the medicine given to the patient was actually poison. Ravi defends the case says that the patient did not die of this medicine. To prove himself right, Ravi drinks the medicine in court and refutes the claim. The court releases Sanjay. Just after the judgement, Sanjay rushes Ravi to the hospital, where it is revealed that the medicine contained poison, and Ravi is saved. Sunitha calls him on a cafè to appreciate his efforts and kindness, where they fall for each other. Patil's son Vikram "Vicky", a spoiled brat, not knowing anything about Ravi, teases Sunitha, which irritates the couple, and Ravi thrashes Vicky and his friends.

Sanjay wants to appreciate and compensate Arun for the risky effort that he took to save him, and calls for a get-together in his mansion. Sanjay gives Ravi a blank cheque, but Ravi rejects the offers politely and says he did for his self-satisfaction. He then finds the same piano with the sticker of Bhagwat Geeta of Krishna, which Bramhavar used to play and was auctioned. Ravi memories are refreshed again and requests Sanjay that this piano is very significant to him and asks for it. Sanjay happily gives him the piano. At Ravi's home, Sanjay sees Sharadha's photo hanging on the wall, and immediately recognises the face with the patient he was handling for mental disorders.

Ravi and Asha meet Sharadha at the mental hospital, where they learn that her memories had stopped on the day of the incident. Sharadha feels that their children are still young. Ravi brings Sharadha to his house and tries to make her come back to normal, where she regains her memory. Meanwhile, Vicky wants to exact vengeance on Ravi, and devises a plan to trap Asha, who studies in the same college. He impresses her by his ways of flattering people. The plan works, where Asha falls for him and convinces her to elope with him (so that he can publicly defame Ravi by leaving Asha). At the planned moment, one of Vicky's ex-girlfriends arrives and tells Asha of Vicky's intentions. In the ensuing argument, Vicky kills his girlfriend which is witnessed by Sanjay. Ravi steps in as the prosecutor against Patil, who is defending Vicky.

The case moves ups and downs, but Ravi has the upper hand. Patil kidnaps Sharadha and attempts to blackmail him. Ravi leaves to save Sharadha, and is thrashed by Patil's goons near a temple. Though injured, Ravi fights back. In an attempt to shoot Ravi, Patil shoots his friend's son Tony and is imprisoned, and unsuccessful in saving Vicky, who is given the death penalty. Patil becomes a mentally unstable person, where Ravi and his family live happily ever after.

== Cast ==
- Ravichandran as Adv. Ravi Bramhavar
- Poonam Dhillon as Sunitha
- Bharathi Vishnuvardhan as Sharadha Devi, Ravi's mother
- Srinivasa Murthy as Bramhavar, Ravi's father (Guest Appearance)
- Devaraj as Adv. J.D. Patil
- Shashikumar as Vicky
- Jaggesh as Tony
- Master Manjunath as Chaddi
- Ramakrishna as Dr. Sanjay
- Avinash as Dr. Hegde
- T.N.Balakrishna as Shamanna
- Doddanna as Inspector Doddayya
- Jyothi Gurucharan as Indumathi
- Rathnakar as M.L.A Lakshmipathi
- Sathyajith as Bhadra
- Rajaram H.N.
- C.P.Yogeshwar
- Thriller Manju
- Bank Suresh
- Lohithaswa

== Soundtrack ==
All songs were written and composed by Hamsalekha.

Yuddha Kanda

Soundtrack album by Hamsalekha
- Genre: Feature film soundtrack
- Label: Lahari Audio

Track #	Song	Singer(s)	Duration
1	Kudiyodhe Nanna	S. P. Balasubrahmanyam	4:49
2	Sole Illa	S. P. Balasubrahmanyam, S. Janaki	4:38
3	Kempu Thotadalli	S. P. Balasubrahmanyam, Vani Jairam, B. R. Chaya	6:02
4	Bolo Re Shanthi	S. P. Balasubrahmanyam, B. R. Chaya	4:26
5	Nooraroorugalalli	S. P. Balasubrahmanyam, Vani Jairam	4:34
6	Sa Ri Ga Ma	S. P. Balasubrahmanyam, Latha Hamsalekha	4:38
7	Muddina Gini	S. P. Balasubrahmanyam, Manjula Gururaj	4:44
8	Solle Illa (Sad version)	S. P. Balasubrahmanyam, S. Janaki	4:38
9	Piano bit	Hamsalekha	0:43
10	Sole Illa (Bit version)	S. P. Balasubrahmanyam	1:46

== Legacy ==
M. S. Ramesh revealed that Yuddha Kanda inspired him to make Dasharatha with Ravichandran which also featured him in a role of a lawyer.
