= Romance (1983 film) =

- Directed by: Ramanand Sagar
- Produced by: Ramanand Sagar
- Starring: Kumar Gaurav; Poonam Dhillon; Shammi Kapoor; Sushma Seth; Saeed Jaffrey
- Music by: Rahul Dev Burman
- Release date: 21 October 1983
- Country: India
- Language: Hindi

Romance is a 1983 Hindi-language Indian film produced and directed by Ramanand Sagar. The film stars Kumar Gaurav, Poonam, Dhillon, Shammi Kapoor, Sushma Seth and Saeed Jaffrey. Romance is a colorful, lively story of two teenage lovers of the jet age: Sonia, a half-English girl, and Amar, an Indian youth, whose romance blossoms across thousands of miles and crosses all barriers.

== Plot ==
British-based Mr. and Mrs. Roy are thrilled when their son announces that he is going to marry a Caucasian woman. Soon they are blessed with a granddaughter, Sonia. Tragically, their son dies, leaving them heartbroken.

Sonia grows up under her mother's strict control and guidance, and the love of her grandparents, who encourage her to visit India, which she does. When she returns, she announces that she has met her soulmate 'Amar', whom she is going to invite to Britain, where they will marry.

Her mother does not approve of this, as she wants Sonia to marry the Caucasian male of her choice and will not permit any interference from her in-laws, who are asked to leave her house. In the meantime, Amar's passport and money are stolen. He manages to board a ship bound for Britain, where he is subsequently apprehended, arrested, and turned over for prosecution and possible deportation as an illegal immigrant. It looks like Sonia's mother will have her way with her daughter after all.

== Cast ==
- Kumar Gaurav as Amar
- Poonam Dhillon as Sonia
- Shammi Kapoor as Mr. Roy(Cameo)
- Sushma Seth as Mrs. Roy
- Saeed Jaffrey as Journalist / Editor
- Prema Narayan as Journalist / Editor's Wife
- Helena Luke as Sonia's Mother
- Tom Alter as Priest
- Viju Khote as Thief
- Raj Babbar as Guest Appearance
- Ranjeeta as Guest Appearance

== Soundtrack ==
Lyrics: Anand Bakshi

Song	Singer
"Yeh Zindagi"	R. D. Burman
"Aur Intezar Ab"	Amit Kumar
"Aayi Aayi Aayi"	Amit Kumar, Lata Mangeshkar
"Maang Lunga"	Amit Kumar, Lata Mangeshkar
"O My God"	Amit Kumar, Lata Mangeshkar
"Love Love Love"	Manna Dey, Asha Bhosle, Chandrashekhar Gadgil
