= Jurrat (film) =

- Promotional Poster
- Directed by: David Dhawan
- Written by: K K Singh
- Screenplay by: Rajendra Kumar
- Produced by: Rajendra Kumar
- Starring: Shatrughan Sinha; Kumar Gaurav; Anita Raj; Amala; Aruna Irani; Tinnu Anand; Amrish Puri
- Edited by: Rajendra Kumar; David Dhawan
- Music by: R. D. Burman
- Release date: 29 December 1989
- Country: India
- Language: Hindi

Jurrat (transl. Daring) is a 1989 Indian action film directed by David Dhawan, starring Shatrughan Sinha and Kumar Gaurav with Amrish Puri. Jurrat is an unofficial remake of the 1987 American film The Untouchables.

== Plot ==
Abdullah Roti was the first person to confront Kama, the underworld don of Bombay, and his life was tragically ended by a bombing in his Bandra bakery. Inspector Ram Singh was the second person to confront Kama. Although he was able to detain and prosecute one of his colleagues, Girdhar, he was ultimately imprisoned for contempt of court and had his official duties suspended. That evening, he gets home to discover the house is dark. He enters and discovers his kid Sunny and wife Savitri's lifeless bodies. Ram turns to booze after failing to gather evidence against Kama. Joseph, one of Kama's own accomplices, challenges Kama and leaves with Julie, his lover, and a suitcase full of cash. After being pursued, both are brought to Kama, who agrees to spare Joseph—but only if Julie chooses to become his. Joseph and Julie try to outsmart Kama, but their scheme is uncovered, and Joseph's life is taken. Since then, Inspector Avinash has been moved from Delhi and given Kama's case. Renu is Avinash's spouse. Anwar, an informant, points Avinash in the direction of gold biscuits, but they turn out to be genuine biscuits, embarrassing the Police Department overall. After Avinash successfully apprehends Girdhar, he is informed that Renu's life is in jeopardy. Will Avinash dare to keep slaying Kama and end up another victim is the unanswered question.

== Cast ==
- Shatrughan Sinha as Inspector Ram Singh
- Kumar Gaurav as Inspector Avinash
- Anita Raj as Julie
- Amala as Renu
- Ranjeeta as Savitri Singh
- Aruna Irani as Fatima
- Tinu Anand as Anwar
- Kiran Kumar as Raja
- Amrish Puri as Kama
- Bharat Kapoor as Sunil Saxena Kama's Lawyer
- Raj Kiran as Joseph
- Shammi as Mary Joseph's Mother
- Akash Khurana as Police Commissioner Khurana
- Roopesh Kumar as Girdhar
- Yunus Parvez as Abdullah Roti
- Sudhir Pandey as Inspector Pandey
- Om Shivpuri as Judge Kailash Sinha

== Soundtrack ==
Lyrics: Anand Bakshi

Song	Singer
"Main Galiyon Ka Ek Fakira" - 1	Mohammed Aziz
"Main Galiyon Ka Ek Fakira" - 2	Mohammed Aziz
"Pooja Karo Jee Se, Jaan Se"	Lata Mangeshkar
"Main Neend Chura Loongi"	Asha Bhosle
"O Saiyaad, Rakh Yaad"	Asha Bhosle
"Oye Naukar Sarkari"	Alka Yagnik
