= Shashi Kiran (actor) =

Indian actor

- kiran in 2006
- Born: 4 June 1959 (age 67); Bantwal, Karnataka, India
- Education: Film and Television Institute of India
- Occupation: Actor
- Years active: 1971–present
- Known for: Coolie No. 1; Judwaa; Yes Boss

Shashi Kiran (also credited as Sashi Kiran; born 4 June 1959) is an Indian actor who works primarily in Hindi cinema and Hindi-language television. He is a graduate of the Film and Television Institute of India (FTII) in Pune. e made his screen debut in 1971 as Neelu in Gulzar's Mere Apne and has since appeared in supporting and character roles across more than five decades.

He is most often identified with commercial Hindi films such as Coolie No. 1 (1995), Judwaa (1997) and Yes Boss (1997). Over the course of his career he has shared screen space with Amitabh Bachchan, Shah Rukh Khan, Salman Khan, Govinda and Rishi Kapoor. Despite working in the industry for more than fifty years, he has remained a supporting actor and has not achieved lead-role status.

== Early life ==
Kiran was born on 4 June 1959 in Bantwal, Karnataka. He is a graduate of the Film and Television Institute of India in Pune.

== Career ==
Kiran began his film career in 1971 with a role in Gulzar's Mere Apne. In 1973 he appeared in Raj Kapoor's Bobby.

He appeared in several Hindi films during the 1980s and 1990s, including Ghar, Red Rose, Phir Wohi Raat, Maalamaal, Awwal Number, 100 Days, Bol Radha Bol (1992), Dil Tera Aashiq (1993), Coolie No. 1 (1995), Akele Hum Akele Tum (1995), Judwaa (1997), Hero No. 1 (1997), Yes Boss (1997) and Deewana Mastana (1997). In 2016 The Indian Express identified Partner, Judwaa, Hero No. 1 and Bade Miyan Chote Miyan among his film credits.

In the 2000s and 2010s his credits included Jodi No.1 (2001), Baghban (2003), Partner (2007), Bhoothnath (2008), God Tussi Great Ho (2008), Tees Maar Khan (2010), No Problem (2010), Murder 2 (2011) and Julie 2 (2017). In 2020 he appeared in the remake of Coolie No. 1. In 2023 he appeared in the film Mast Mein Rehne Ka.

Kiran has also worked in television. In 2016 he appeared in the Zee TV series Amma as Mama. In December 2016 The Indian Express reported that he would appear in the television series Bahu Hamari Rajni Kant as a counsellor. In a statement published by the newspaper he said, "I'm playing a role of a counsellor, a psychiatrist who will be there to guide Shaan and Rajni," and recalled an earlier collaboration with Pallavi Pradhan on the show Yeh Duniya Hai Rangeen. He has also appeared in CID, Sanjog Se Bani Sangini, Raja Ki Ayegi Baraat and Bhagonwali. In 2020 he portrayed Munshi Ji in the Amazon Prime Video series Bandish Bandits.

== Television ==
Year	Title	Role	Network
2016	Amma	Mama	Zee TV
2016	Bahu Hamari Rajni Kant	Counsellor	Life OK
2020	Bandish Bandits	Munshi Ji	Amazon Prime Video
	CID		Sony TV
	Sanjog Se Bani Sangini	Kanhaiya Lal	Zee TV
	Raja Ki Ayegi Baraat		StarPlus
	Bhagonwali	Lakhan Mishra Chacha	Zee TV

== Selected filmography ==
Year	Film	Role
1971	Mere Apne	Neelu
1973	Bobby	Shyam
1978	Ghar	
1980	Red Rose	
1980	Phir Wohi Raat	
1987	Marte Dam Tak	
1988	Maalamaal	
1989	Love Love Love	
1990	Awwal Number	
1991	100 Days	
1992	Bol Radha Bol	
1993	Dil Tera Aashiq	
1995	Coolie No. 1	Porter
1995	Akele Hum Akele Tum	
1997	Judwaa	
1997	Hero No. 1	
1997	Yes Boss	
1997	Deewana Mastana	
1998	Bade Miyan Chote Miyan	
2001	Jodi No.1	
2002	Chor Machaye Shor	
2003	Baghban	
2007	Partner	Newspaper vendor
2008	Bhoothnath	Taxi driver
2008	God Tussi Great Ho	Corrupt doctor
2008	Hello	
2009	Jai Veeru	Garage mechanic
2009	Sanam Teri Kasam	Vijay's friend
2010	Na Ghar Ke Na Ghaat Ke	Tarak Nath
2010	No Problem	Ramlal
2010	Tees Maar Khan	Santram (bank manager)
2010	Do Knot Disturb	Raj's employee
2010	London Calling	Amit (chauffeur)
2011	Murder 2	
2011	Chatur Singh Two Star	Havaldar
2014	Kirpaan: The Sword of Honour	(as Shashikiran)
2014	Jai Ho	School watchman
2015	Punjabian Da King	Kameya
2017	Julie 2	Producer Shashi
2017	Patel Ki Punjabi Shaadi	Guggi's relative
2017	Toofan Singh	Shanti Sawroop
2017	Hard Kaur	
2019	Gone Kesh	Pandit Ji
2020	Coolie No. 1	Coolie Chacha
2023	Mast Mein Rehne Ka	Sundar Sukhani
