= 29th Filmfare Awards =

1982 awards for Hindi cinema

- Date: 1982
- Site: Bombay

Highlights
- Best Film: Kalyug
- Best Actor: Naseeruddin Shah for Chakra
- Best Actress: Smita Patil for Chakra
- Most awards: Chakra, Ek Duuje Ke Liye, Kalyug & Kudrat (3)
- Most nominations: Ek Duuje Ke Liye (13)

The 29th Filmfare Awards were held in 1982.

Films belonging to the Parallel Cinema and Indian New Wave won most of the awards at the ceremony, signaling a trend where filmmakers and audiences were moving towards more meaningful cinema.

Ek Duuje Ke Liye led the ceremony with 13 nominations, followed by Chakra with 6 nominations, Baseraa and Kalyug with 5 nominations each, and Umrao Jaan with 3 nominations.

Chakra, Ek Duuje Ke Liye, Kalyug & Kudrat won 3 awards each, thus becoming the most-awarded films at the ceremony.

Amitabh Bachchan received dual nominations for Best Actor for his performances in Laawaris and Silsila, but lost to Naseeruddin Shah who won the award for Chakra.

Amjad Khan also received dual nominations for Best Supporting Actor for his performances in Love Story and Yaarana, winning for the latter.

== Main awards ==
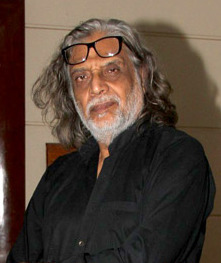
Muzaffar Ali — Best Director winner for Umrao Jaan

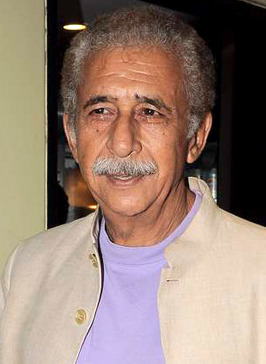
Naseeruddin Shah — Best Actor winner for Chakra

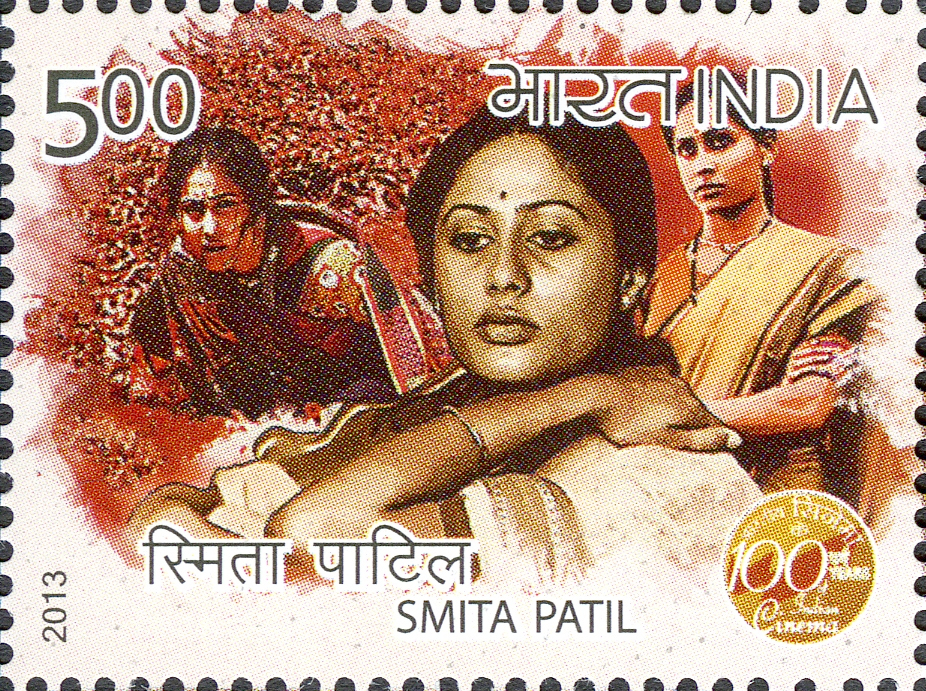
Smita Patil — Best Actress winner for Chakra

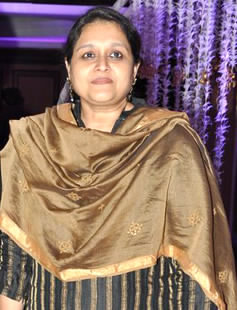
Supriya Pathak — Best Supporting Actress winner for Kalyug

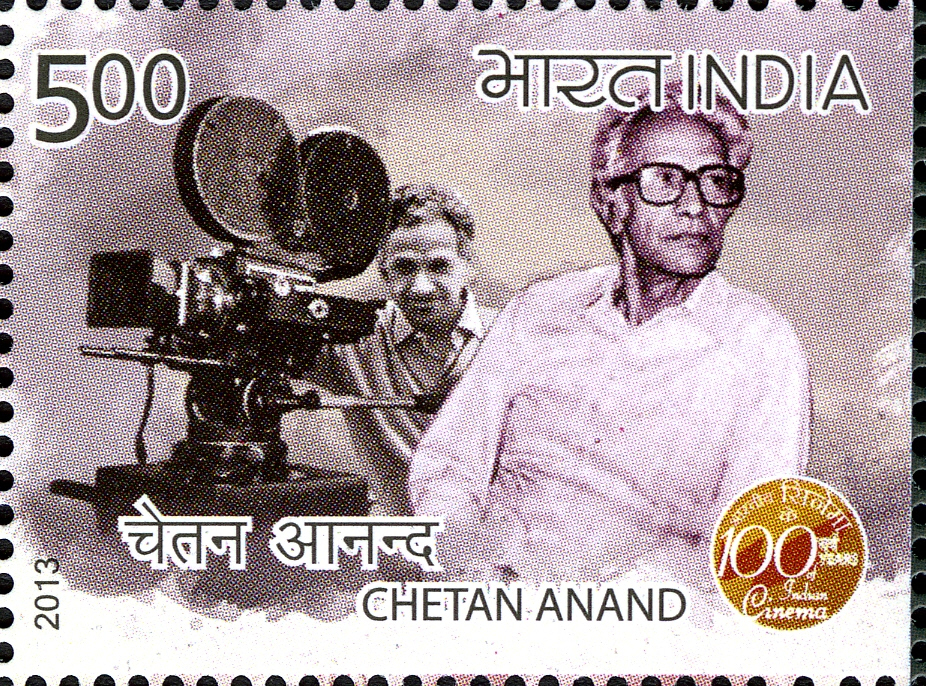
Chetan Anand — Best Story winner for Kudrat

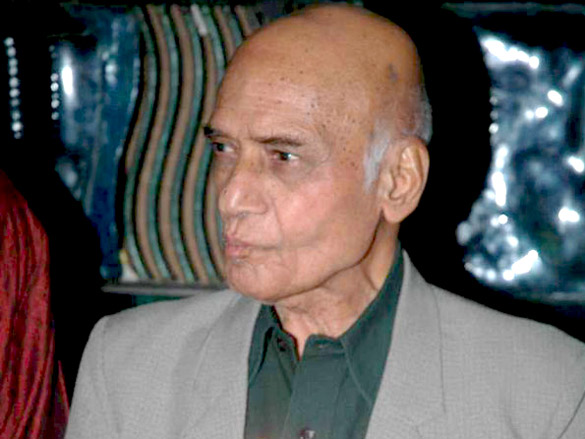
Mohammed Zahur Khayyam — Best Music Director winner for Umrao Jaan

=== Best Film ===
Kalyug

- Baseraa
- Chakra
- Chashme Buddoor
- Ek Duuje Ke Liye

=== Best Director ===
Muzaffar Ali – Umrao Jaan

- K. Balachander – Ek Duuje Ke Liye
- Rabindra Dharmraj – Chakra
- Ramesh Talwar – Baseraa
- Sai Paranjpye – Chashme Buddoor
- Shyam Benegal – Kalyug

=== Best Actor ===
Naseeruddin Shah – Chakra

- Amitabh Bachchan – Laawaris
- Amitabh Bachchan – Silsila
- Kamal Haasan – Ek Duuje Ke Liye
- Rajesh Khanna – Dard

=== Best Actress ===
Smita Patil – Chakra

- Hema Malini – Naseeb
- Jaya Bachchan – Silsila
- Raakhee – Baseraa
- Rati Agnihotri – Ek Duuje Ke Liye
- Rekha – Umrao Jaan

=== Best Supporting Actor ===
Amjad Khan – Yaarana

- Amjad Khan – Love Story
- Rakesh Roshan – Dhanwan
- Saeed Jaffrey – Chashme Buddoor
- Suresh Oberoi – Laawaris

=== Best Supporting Actress ===
Supriya Pathak – Kalyug

- Aruna Irani – Rocky
- Madhavi – Ek Duuje Ke Liye
- Nanda – Ahista Ahista
- Sarika – Sharda

=== Best Comic Actor ===
Utpal Dutt – Naram Garam

- Anoop Kumar – Chalti Ka Naam Zindagi
- Asrani – Ek Duuje Ke Liye
- Rakesh Bedi – Chashme Buddoor
- Ravi Baswani – Chashme Buddoor

=== Best Story ===
Kudrat – Chetan Anand

- Baseraa – Leela Phansalkar
- Chakra – Jaywant Dalvi
- Ek Duuje Ke Liye – K. Balachander
- Kalyug – Shyam Benegal and Girish Karnad

=== Best Screenplay ===
Ek Duuje Ke Liye – K. Balachander

=== Best Dialogue ===
Meri Awaaz Suno – Kader Khan

=== Best Music Director ===
Umrao Jaan – Khayyam

- Armaan – Bappi Lahiri
- Ek Duuje Ke Liye – Laxmikant–Pyarelal
- Love Story – R. D. Burman
- Silsila – Shiv–Hari

=== Best Lyricist ===
Ek Duuje Ke Liye – Anand Bakshi for Tere Mere Beech Main

- Baseraa – Gulzar for Jahan Pe Savera
- Ek Duuje Ke Liye – Anand Bakshi for Solah Baras Ki
- Kranti – Santosh Anand for Zindagi Ki Naa Toote
- Love Story – Anand Bakshi for Teri Yaad Aa Rahi Hai

=== Best Playback Singer, Male ===
Love Story – Amit Kumar for Teri Yaad Aa Rahi Hai

- Ek Duuje Ke Liye – S. P. Balasubramaniam for Tere Mere Beech Main
- Kudrat – Kishore Kumar for Humein Tumse Pyaar Kitna
- Prem Geet – Jagjit Singh for Honthon Se Chulo Tum
- Yaarana – Kishore Kumar for Choo Kar Mere Mann Ko

=== Best Playback Singer, Female ===
Kudrat – Parveen Sultana for Humein Tumse Pyaar Kitna

- Armaan – Sharon Prabhakar for Mere Jaisi Haseena
- Armaan – Usha Uthup for Rambha Ho
- Laawaris – Alka Yagnik for Mere Angne Main
- Poonam – Chandrani Mukherjee for Mohabbat Rang Laayegi

=== Best Art Direction ===
Chakra – Bansi Chandragupta

=== Best Cinematography ===
Kudrat – Jal Mistry

=== Best Editing ===
Ek Duuje Ke Liye – K. R. Kitoo

=== Best Sound ===
Kalyug – Hitendra Ghosh

=== Special Award ===
Padmini Kolhapure – Ahista Ahista

== Critics' awards ==
=== Best Film ===
Aadarshila

=== Best Documentary ===
Faces After the Storm

== Biggest Winners ==
- Kudrat – 3/4
- Kalyug – 3/5
- Chakra – 3/6
- Ek Duuje Ke Liye – 3/13
- Umrao Jaan – 2/3
- Baseraa – 0/5

== See also ==
- 31st Filmfare Awards
- 30th Filmfare Awards
- Filmfare Awards
