= Sindhu (film) =

- Directed by: J. Sasikumar
- Written by: Sreekumaran Thampi (dialogues)
- Screenplay by: Sreekumaran Thampi
- Based on: Puguntha Veedu (1972)
- Produced by: R. Somanathan
- Starring: Prem Nazir; Madhu; Lakshmi; Vidhubala
- Cinematography: J. G. Vijayam
- Edited by: K. Sankunni
- Music by: M. K. Arjunan
- Production company: Soorya
- Distributed by: Soorya
- Release date: 28 November 1975
- Country: India
- Language: Malayalam

Sindhu is a 1975 Indian Malayalam film, directed by J. Sasikumar and produced by R. Somanathan, starring Prem Nazir, Madhu, Lakshmi and Vidhubala. Its musical score was composed by M. K. Arjunan. It is a remake of the Tamil film Pugundha Veedu released in 1972. Pugundha Veedu was also remade in Telugu as Puttinillu Mettinillu, with actress Lakshmi reprising her role in all three versions.

== Cast ==
- Prem Nazir as Jayan
- Madhu as Rajendran
- Lakshmi as Sindhu
- Vidhubala as Geetha
- Kaviyoor Ponnamma as Parvathi Amma
- Adoor Bhasi as Venu | Venu's Father
- Sreelatha Namboothiri as Kalyani / Kala
- T. S. Muthaiah as Govinda Menon

== Soundtrack ==
The music was composed by M. K. Arjunan and the lyrics were written by Sreekumaran Thampi.

| No. | Song | Singers | Lyrics | Length (m:ss) |
|---|---|---|---|---|
| 1 | "Chandrodayam Kandu" | P. Susheela, P. Jayachandran | Sreekumaran Thampi | |
| 2 | "Chettikkulangara Bharani" | K. J. Yesudas | Sreekumaran Thampi | |
| 3 | "En Chiriyo Poothiri" | K. J. Yesudas, Vani Jairam | Sreekumaran Thampi | |
| 4 | "Jeevanil Dukhathin" | P. Susheela | Sreekumaran Thampi | |
| 5 | "Thedithedi" | K. J. Yesudas | Sreekumaran Thampi | |
| 6 | "Thedithedi" | Vani Jairam | Sreekumaran Thampi | |
| 7 | "Thedithedi" (Bit) | K. J. Yesudas | Sreekumaran Thampi | |
| 8 | "Thedithedi" (No BGM Bit) | K. J. Yesudas | Sreekumaran Thampi | |
