= Love Story (1981 film) =

- Theatrical release poster
- Directed by: Rahul Rawail
- Written by: Mirza Brothers
- Produced by: Rajendra Kumar
- Starring: Rajendra Kumar; Kumar Gaurav; Vijayta Pandit; Danny Denzongpa; Vidya Sinha
- Cinematography: Radhu Karmakar
- Edited by: David Dhawan
- Music by: R. D. Burman
- Distributed by: Aryan Films
- Release date: 27 February 1981
- Running time: 165 min
- Country: India
- Language: Hindi

Love Story is a 1981 Indian Hindi-language romantic drama film directed by Rahul Rawail. The film stars Rajendra Kumar alongside his son Kumar Gaurav and Vijayta Pandit, both making their film debuts. Danny Denzongpa, Vidya Sinha, Amjad Khan and Aruna Irani appear in supporting roles.

Box Office India declared it a blockbuster.

== Plot ==
Vijay Mehra is a wealthy builder and loves Suman, who also loves Vijay. Ram Dogra is a civil engineer who loves Suman. Ram and Suman were friends in college.

But Vijay leaves Suman because he feels jealous of Ram and Suman's friendship and marries another girl, and Suman marries Ram, but Vijay's wife dies after giving birth to a baby boy, Bunty, while Suman and Ram welcome a baby girl, Pinky.

Years later, Bunty and Pinky meet as strangers, Vijay wants Bunty to become a builder with him, but Bunty wants to become a pilot, due to this reason, Bunty leaves home, and Pinky also leaves the home because her father wants her to marry.

Bunty and Pinky meet again, but Hawaldar Sher Singh, who is assigned the job of finding the missing boy and girl, handcuffs them together. They both fall in love with each other, and they leave to build a small cottage and live together.

Ram later enters the scene and forcibly takes away Pinky. Eventually, Vijay is ready to accept his son's love, but Ram plans to arrange his daughter's marriage against her wishes.

Bunty and Pinky run away from home again, but a gang of robbers follow them, suddenly, Vijay and Ram come to save their children and Bunty saves Ram's life. Ram changes his mind, and in the end Bunty and Pinky marry.

== Cast ==
- Rajendra Kumar as Vijay Mehra
- Kumar Gaurav as Bunty Mehra
- Vijayta Pandit as Pinky Dogra
- Danny Denzongpa as Ram Dogra
- Vidya Sinha as Suman Dogra
- Amjad Khan as Constable Sher Singh
- Aruna Irani as Dancer
- Beena Banerjee as Sushma Mehra; Vijay's Wife
- Bharat Kapoor as Basheera

== Soundtrack ==
The music was composed by R. D. Burman, with lyrics by Anand Bakshi.

Amit Kumar performed vocals for Kumar Gaurav.

Song	Singer
"Kaisa Tera Pyar, Kaisa Gussa Hai Tera, Tauba Sanam"	Lata Mangeshkar, Amit Kumar
"Dekho Maine Dekha Hai Yeh Ek Sapna"	Lata Mangeshkar, Amit Kumar
"Teri Yaad Aa Rahi Hai" (Duet)	Lata Mangeshkar, Amit Kumar
"Teri Yaad Aa Rahi Hai" (Solo)	Amit Kumar
"Yeh Ladki Zara Si Deewani Lagti Hai"	Asha Bhosle, Amit Kumar
"Kya Ghazab Karte Ho Ji"	Asha Bhosle

== Awards ==
29th Filmfare Awards:

Won

- Best Male Playback Singer – Amit Kumar for "Teri Yaad Aa Rahi Hai"

Nominated

- Best Supporting Actor – Amjad Khan
- Best Music Director – R. D. Burman
- Best Lyricist – Anand Bakshi for "Teri Yaad Aa Rahi Hai"
