= Shiva Ka Insaaf =

- Poster
- Directed by: Raj N. Sippy
- Written by: Kader Khan (dialogues)
- Screenplay by: Ravi Kapoor; Mohan Kaul
- Produced by: Romu N. Sippy
- Starring: Jackie Shroff; Poonam Dhillon; Shakti Kapoor; Gulshan Grover; Vinod Mehra; Mazhar Khan; Parikshit Sahni
- Cinematography: Ashok Mehta
- Edited by: Waman Bhonsle; Gurudutt Shirali
- Music by: R. D. Burman
- Production company: Rupam Pictures
- Release date: 15 March 1985
- Country: India
- Language: Hindi

Shiva Ka Insaaf (transl. Shiva's Justice) is a 1985 Indian Hindi-language superhero film directed by Raj N. Sippy. The film stars Jackie Shroff, Poonam Dhillon, Shakti Kapoor, Gulshan Grover. The music was composed by R. D. Burman. The film is termed as the first Hindi film to be filmed in 3D.

== Plot ==
Bhola, whose parents get killed by Jagan (Shakti Kapoor). He is then raised by 3 strong men named Ram (Vinod Mehra), Rahim (Mazhar Khan) and Robert (Parikshit Sahni). They groom Bhola with various physical training and he becomes a powerful Shiva (Jackie Shroff). He leaves his village and goes to a city to work as a journalist, where he meets Nisha (Poonam Dhillon) who works as the manager. By destroying the dacoits shiva becomes the favourite hero for the people. The dacoits belong to Jagan who gets severe loss due to this. Jagan is the owner of the newspaper and There he lives the life of Bhola a comic journalist. Nisha loves shiva whom she suspects as bhola after bhola after drunk tells he is shiva. But vikram comes in the dress of shiva and tries to seduce Nisha this same time shiva appears and fights down Vikram who have to leave, now shiva unmasks his face and shows Nisha he is bhola only .When she finds his reality, they fall in love with each other. Jagan is madly searching to find out shiva and offers money whoever shows Shiva identity. A close friend of the 3 strong men introduces them to Jagan and Jagan threatens if they don't kill shiva they will explode bomb and kill poor children in the orphanage so shiva gets stabbed to coma and Jagan finds out it is bhola and now Jagan changes word and tells he will kill the entire children and also have Nisha in custody but this time shiva gets up and takes away all the bombs and with the 3 strong men fights with Jagan and his evil goons.At the end, he kills Jagan, who killed his parents as well as his son Vikram (Gulshan Grover).

== Cast ==
- Jackie Shroff as Bhola / Shiva
- Poonam Dhillon as Nisha
- Shakti Kapoor as Jagan
- Gulshan Grover as Vikram
- Vinod Mehra as Ram
- Mazhar Khan as Rahim
- Parikshit Sahni as Robert
- Satish Kaul as Advocate Prakashnath

== Soundtrack ==
Lyrics: Gulshan Bawra

| Song | Singer |
|---|---|
| "Kal Ke Shiva Tum Ho" | Kishore Kumar |
| "Ja Ja Re Mawaali" | Asha Bhosle |
| "Aankhon Hi Aankhon Mein Jaan-E-Jaan Vaade Hue" | Asha Bhosle, Mohammed Aziz |
| "Bhang Jamaye Rang Zara Sa, Dalo Ui Maa Dhatura" | Asha Bhosle, Mohammed Aziz |
| "Waqt Aa Gaya, Inquilaab Lana Hoga, Zulmon Ka Kuch To Jawab Lana Hoga" | Suresh Wadkar, Mohammed Aziz, Nandu Bhende |

== See also ==
- List of Indian superhero films
