= Kalyug (1981 film) =

- Film poster
- Directed by: Shyam Benegal
- Written by: Shyam Benegal; Satyadev Dubey; Girish Karnad
- Based on: Mahabharata by Vyasa
- Produced by: Shashi Kapoor
- Starring: Shashi Kapoor; Rekha; Raj Babbar; Anant Nag
- Cinematography: Govind Nihalani
- Edited by: Bhanudas Divakar
- Music by: Vanraj Bhatia
- Distributed by: Film-Valas
- Release date: 24 July 1981
- Running time: 152 minutes
- Country: India
- Language: Hindi

Kalyug (transl. "Age of Darkness," "Age of Vice," or "Age of Quarrel and Hypocrisy") is a 1981 Indian Hindi-language crime drama film, directed by Shyam Benegal. It is known as a modern-day adaptation of the Indian epic Mahabharat, depicting an archetypal conflict between rival business houses. Kalyug went on to win the Filmfare Award for Best Film in 1982 and was among the only three Indian films which were submitted to the Academy Awards. The film also went in Berlin International Film Festival for best screenplay and Shashi Kapoor’s phenomenal acting who played the central role of Karna in the epic film was also praised. The film was also nominated for the Golden Prize Award at Moscow International Film Festival.

Shashi Kapoor, Rekha, Anant Nag, Raj Babbar, Supriya Pathak, Kulbhushan Kharbanda, Sushma Seth, Akash Khurana, Victor Bannerjee, Reema Lagoo, and A.K. Hangal played major roles and Urmila Matondkar appeared as a child artist. The film had its world premiere at the 12th Moscow International Film Festival on 21 July 1981 and was released theatrically in India on 24 July 1981.

== Cast ==
- Shashi Kapoor as Karan Singh/Karna
- Rekha as Supriya/Draupadi
- Anant Nag as Bharat Raj/Arjuna
- Raj Babbar as Dharam Raj/Yudhisthira
- Kulbhushan Kharbanda as Bal Raj/Bhima
- Reema Lagoo as Bal Raj's wife/Hidimbi
- Supriya Pathak as Subhadra/Subhadra
- Victor Bannerjee as Dhan Raj/Duryodhana
- A.K. Hangal as Bhisham Chand/Bhishma
- Sushma Seth as Savitri/Kunti
- Amrish Puri as Kishan Chand/Krishna
- Om Puri as Bhavani Pandey
- Akash Khurana as Sandeep Raj/Dussasana
- Urmila Matondkar as child artiste/Parikshit
- Vijaya Mehta as Devaki/Gandhari
- Salim Ghouse as Desai
- Vinay Apte as Mhatre, Union Leader
- Madan Jain as Kulkarni, Mill Worker

== Plot ==
This is a tale of intrigue, plots and the inevitable war between two families.

Ramchand and Bhishamchand were two pioneering brothers in business. Bhishamchand, a lifelong bachelor, brought up the two sons of Ramchand upon his demise. He also gave the family business a firm foundation. Khubchand, the elder son of Ramchand begets two sons, Dhanraj and Sandeepraj. Puranchand, Khubchand's younger brother, had died a few years ago. His three sons are Dharamraj, Balraj and Bharatraj. Another player in the game is Karan, an orphan brought up by Bhishamchand.

A series of events brings the long-hidden feud between the two families to light. Despite Bhishamchand's efforts to mediate between the two, the situation gets out of hand and events take a tragic turn. Dhanraj's men accidentally kill the young son of Balraj and to take revenge, Bharatraj murders Karan. Quite a few skeletons from the family cupboard are brought into the open that only add to the tensions and hatred, finally culminating in the destruction of the two families, showing the brittleness of our moral fabric.

== Reception ==
Madhu Trehan of India Today wrote ″Kalyug, as most film-goers have learnt to expect from Shyam Benegal, is different. The film demands that it be seen slowly, mulled over carefully and, preferably, as in all epics, seen again. Benegal snips away at a richly labyrinthia of tapestry of his own making of two battling industrial families destroying each other, leaving nothing but shreds of torn broken thread.″ Anil Dharker, writing for International Film Guide, wrote a positive review, calling it "ambitious" and noting it as "the most complex of Benegal's films so far", which is "carefully paced" and "expertly put together". Dharker praised the cinematographic work and the acting: "Govind Nihalani, Benegal's regular cameraman, highlights each shifting mood with skillful lighting. The cast, most of it Benegal regulars, is excellent, with virtuoso performances from Victor Banerjee, and Shashi Kapoor..."

== Awards ==
29th Filmfare Awards

Won

- Best Film – Shashi Kapoor
- Best Supporting Actress – Supriya Pathak
- Best Sound Design – Hitendra Ghosh

Nominated

- Best Director – Shyam Benegal
- Best Story – Shyam Benegal, Girish Karnad
