= Nishaan (film) =

- Theatrical release poster
- Directed by: Surendra Mohan
- Written by: Aziz Qaisi; Gulshan Bawra (lyrics)
- Produced by: B. S. Shaad
- Starring: Jeetendra; Rajesh Khanna; Rekha; Poonam Dhillon
- Cinematography: Anand V. Ganish
- Edited by: Subhash Sehgal
- Music by: Rajesh Roshan
- Production company: BRAR Productions
- Release date: 4 February 1983
- Running time: 150 minutes
- Country: India
- Language: Hindi

Nishaan (transl. Identification Mark) is a 1983 Indian Hindi-language action film, produced by B.S. Shaad under the BRAR Productions banner and directed by Surendra Mohan. It stars Jeetendra, Rajesh Khanna, Rekha, Poonam Dhillon in lead roles and has music composed by Rajesh Roshan.

== Plot ==
Diwan and Bhagail Singh kill Kumar Ratan Singh for his properties. In the confusion that follows that his wife Lajwanti and her sons, Shankar and Ravi are separated. Shankar drifts around in search of his mother and Ravi. Now after years, Shankar is a truck driver and loves a village belle Gulabo, on the other side, Ravi works for Diwan and loves his daughter Rita. Shankar and Ravi are friends. Diwan and Bhagail Singh drive a wedge between them and have Shankar sent to jail on a false charge of theft. Shankar tries to take revenge on Ravi, but he discovers that he is his brother. They turn over Diwan and Bhagail to the police. Shankar and Ravi meet their mother and there is a happy family reunion.

== Cast ==
- Jeetendra as Ravi Singh
- Rajesh Khanna as Shankar Singh
- Rekha as Rita
- Poonam Dhillon as Gulabo
- Jeevan as Diwan
- Amrish Puri as Bhagail Singh
- Roopesh Kumar as Veeru
- Satyendra Kapoor
- Vijay Arora as Kumar Ratan Singh
- Gita Siddharth as Lajwanti
- Chandrashekhar Dubey as Lala
- Jankidas as Pandit
- Rajan Haksar as Mukhiya

== Soundtrack ==
Song	Singer
"Laheron Ki Tarah"	Kishore Kumar
"Humsa Na Payegi, Jahan Bhi Tu Jayegi, Soch Le Tu"	Kishore Kumar, Lata Mangeshkar
"Ankhiyon Hi Ankhiyon Mein Teri Meri Baat Chali"	Kishore Kumar, Lata Mangeshkar
"Beliya Ab Ki Yeh Bahaar Koi Gul Naya Khilayegi"	Kishore Kumar, Lata Mangeshkar
"Sun Sun Sun Sun Meri Jaan, Aise Hi Kho Jaye Na"	Kishore Kumar, Asha Bhosle
"Ae Babu, Meri Chaal Mein"	Lata Mangeshkar
