= Yaadgaar (1984 film) =

- Promotional Poster
- Directed by: Dasari Narayana Rao
- Written by: Dasari Narayana Rao, Dr. Rahi Masoom Reza (dialogue)
- Story by: Rajbabu
- Produced by: Prakash.R.C
- Starring: Kamal Haasan; Poonam Dhillon; Sanjeev Kumar
- Cinematography: M. Kannappa
- Edited by: D. Raja Gopal
- Music by: Bappi Lahiri
- Production company: Shiv Shakti Films
- Distributed by: Aasia Films
- Release date: 20 July 1984
- Country: India
- Language: Hindi

Yaadgar is a 1984 Indian Hindi-language film directed by Dasari Narayana Rao, starring Kamal Haasan, Poonam Dhillon and Sanjeev Kumar. The film featured lyrics penned by Indivar and Anjaan, music by Bappi Lahiri.

== Plot ==
Rajnath "Raju" is a liar; he used to lie to everyone in his village for money. One day a fire erupted in a function in a village, his father was badly injured, he tried to convince the doctor and other villagers to come and help him save his father, but due to his lying habits no one believed him, Eventually, his father died due to lack of medical care. The next day he ends up at his sister's home who was married, his in-laws let him stay in the house in return for helping in household chores, but he ends up as full-time servant and he gets rotten food to eat. One day, when his in-law has an accident, he holds him responsible for being very unlucky for him and the whole family. The next day when he is sent to buy groceries, he saves a blind women from thugs and he ends up losing all the groceries. When he goes home, he gets insulted by his own sister because she does not believe his story and thinks that he must have spent the money for himself. Later, he is given a task to repair a family clock which he accidentally breaks; to buy a replica of the clock, he takes part in a race to earn some money. He wins the race and buys the clock, but when he returns home he is beaten by his in-laws because his sister's husband had lost his job and he again blames him for being so unlucky. His sister cannot tolerate this and just asks her brother to go away and leave the house. He learns that the blind girl's mother is seriously ill so he brings a doctor, but it's too late and her mother died. The story shifts to Rai Sahib Kalpnath Rai, a superstitious rich man who was losing his everything in betting and gambling. One day he encounters Raju while going for a bet and he wins the bet for the very first time in his life. He brings him home as he finds him lucky, as he has no kids, he adopts Raju after various profitable deals. Raju marries the blind girl and gives her treatment at a hospital for her eyesight, she gets her eyesight back and Kalpnath eventually becomes a father. Everything was going well until Raju gets cancer due to eating rotten food for such a long time at his in-laws house. Later, he is blamed for poisoning his new-born brother for inheritance, but when his mother learns that he is already suffering from cancer, she is sorry. Later, her own brother is guilty and then Raju dies in his parents' arms.

== Cast ==
- Sanjeev Kumar as Rai Sahib Kalpnath Rai
- Kamal Haasan as Rajnath "Raju"
- Poonam Dhillon as Naina "Naini"
- Tanuja as Malti
- Jamuna as Laxmi Rai
- Dina Pathak as Suresh's mother
- Purnima as Parvati "Paro"
- Baby Meena
- Sujit Kumar as Suresh
- Rajendranath as Chhotelal
- Bhagwan Dada as Bhagwan
- Yunus Parvez as Munim Govardhan
- Dinessh Hingoo as Rajnath's friend
- Vijay Arora as Dr. Bhatnagar
- Raza Murad as Balwant
- Mohan choti as Rajnath's friend
- Raj Kishore as Chatur Singh

== Soundtrack ==
Yaadgaar

Film score by Bappi Lahiri
- Released: 1984
- Genre: Feature film soundtrack
- Length: 24:48
- Language: Hindi
- Label: Music India Limited (MIL)

The music was composed by Bappi Lahiri. Bangladeshi playback singer Runa Laila sang in this film soundtrack.

| Song | Singer |
|---|---|
| "Aate Hain, Chale Jate Hain"-1 | Kishore Kumar |
| "Aate Hain, Chale Jate Hain"-2 | Kishore Kumar |
| "Raju Mera Naam" | Kishore Kumar |
| "Sa Se Banta Hai Saathi" | Kishore Kumar, Asha Bhosle |
| "Thare Mare Naina Lad Gaye" | Bappi Lahiri |
| "Yeh Mere Dil Ki Dua" | Bappi Lahiri |
| "Ae Dilwale Aao" | Runa Laila |
