= Ek Se Bhale Do =

- Directed by: S. V. Rajendra Singh Babu
- Written by: Kader Khan
- Screenplay by: Sachin Bhowmick
- Produced by: K. D. Mehta
- Starring: Shammi Kapoor; Sharmila Tagore; Kumar Gaurav; Rati Agnihotri; Amjad Khan; Ranjeet
- Music by: R. D. Burman
- Release date: 1985
- Country: India
- Language: Hindi

Ek Se Bhale Do (transl. Two is better than one) is a 1985 Indian Hindi-language film directed by S. V. Rajendra Singh Babu. The film stars Shammi Kapoor, Sharmila Tagore, Kumar Gaurav, Rati Agnihotri, Amjad Khan, Ranjeet in pivotal roles.

== Plot ==
David D'Mello lives a middle-classed lifestyle in Bangalore along with his wife, Mary and a son, Bunty and is a jockey in the Bangalore Turf Club. He has a run-in with a wealthy stud farm owner, Gomango, who kills him. David's death also kills his widower friend, Balram, compelling his son, Bheema, to move in with Mary.

She gives birth to a daughter and makes a living sewing and stitching clothes, while Bunty and Bheema wash cars and do small chores. Years later now both Bheema and Bunty have grown up, work on a stud farm, and look after a pony, Sikandar. Bunty is in love with Jenny and wants to marry her, but her father, William, will only give his blessings after Bunty accumulates some wealth.

In order to get wealthy quickly both Bheema and Bunty decide to rob Gomango and set off a chain of events that will endanger and change their lives forever.

== Cast ==
- Shammi Kapoor as William
- Sharmila Tagore as Mary D'Mello
- Kumar Gaurav as Bunty D'Mello
- Rati Agnihotri as Jenny
- Amjad Khan as Balram / Bheema (Double Role)
- Ranjeet as Gonango
- Parikshit Sahni as David D'Mello

== Soundtrack ==
Lyrics: Anjaan

Song	Singer
"Aaja Aaja Aaja"	Kishore Kumar, Shailendra Singh, Anuradha Paudwal
"Lappa Changa Mein Nache"	Lata Mangeshkar, Kishore Kumar, R. D. Burman
"Aaja Re Meri Zamborin"	Kishore Kumar, Asha Bhosle
"Ae Motu Ae Chhotu Kaam Karo Kaam"	S. P. Balasubrahmanyam, Shailendra Singh, Asha Bhosle
"Main To Nachungi"	Asha Bhosle
