= Gang (film) =

2000 Indian Hindi-language gangster film

- Directed by: Mazhar Khan
- Written by: Mushtaq Merchant (dialogues)
- Story by: Shamsher Khan Baloch
- Produced by: Mazhar Khan; Bharat Shah
- Starring: Jackie Shroff; Nana Patekar; Jaaved Jaffrey; Juhi Chawla; Kumar Gaurav
- Cinematography: Nadeem Khan
- Edited by: Afaque Hussain
- Music by: Anu Malik; R.D. Burman
- Release date: 14 April 2000
- Running time: 165 minutes
- Country: India
- Language: Hindi

Gang is a 2000 Indian Hindi-language gangster drama film directed by Mazhar Khan. The film stars Kumar Gaurav, Jackie Shroff, Nana Patekar, Javed Jaffrey, Juhi Chawla and Imtiaz Khan in pivotal roles. The film began production in 1989 and was delayed for 10 years because of casting changes, financial issues and director Mazhar Khan's ill health. After his death in 1998, his assistant director helped complete the film for release on 14 April 2000. The film was also the last to feature music by RD Burman, who died in 1994.

== Plot ==
Four inseparable friends : Gangu, Abdul, Nihal, and Gary, form the criminal syndicate G.A.N.G., rooted in a bond of unwavering trust. Their ascent is challenged by a local rival, Tagdu, leading them to align with Lala, a veteran gangster with a moral code. However, internal friction arises when Abdul, driven by greed, pushes the group to work for the ruthless Girja Singh. A high-stakes heist involving a cadaver stuffed with cash leaves the group wealthy but marks them as targets.

The group’s descent into "extreme crime business" alienates Gangu’s lover, Sanam, and nearly dissolves their bond. Though they briefly reconcile, a brutal act of retaliation by Tagdu; the murder of Gary's sister, Tinnie, which ignites a bloody gang war. The conflict ends with Gangu serving a five-year prison sentence while his friends ostensibly move on.

Upon his release, Gangu finds his friends living lavishly, only to discover they are still deeply entrenched with Girja Singh. The consequences of their lifestyle soon turn fatal, Nihal’s drug addiction leads to the birth of his disabled child and the subsequent suicide of his wife, Divya. A broken Nihal embarks on a murderous rampage, landing him in custody.

When Girja Singh orders Abdul to assassinate Nihal to keep him silent, Abdul chooses loyalty over life, killing the henchman instead. Realizing the cycle is endless, the group attempts to surrender via the Chief Minister. Fearing their testimony, the Minister betrays them, orchestrating a final hit involving Tagdu and Girja.

In a climactic bloodbath, the group eliminates Tagdu and Girja, but Gangu is mortally wounded. He dies after extracting a promise from his brothers to leave the underworld behind. As the survivors prepare to surrender, the Minister orders an illegal "encounter killing," executing the remaining members of G.A.N.G. in cold blood.

Six years later, the veteran Lala assassinates the Minister to ensure the cycle of violence ends with that generation. He surrenders to the authorities, leaving Sanam to raise Gangu’s son in peace, keeping the memory of the four friends alive through their portraits rather than their crimes.

== Cast ==
- Jackie Shroff as Gangadhar alias Gangu
- Nana Patekar as Abdul
- Kumar Gaurav as Nihal Singh
- Javed Jaffrey as Gary Rozario
- Juhi Chawla as Sanam
- Ekta Sohini as Divya
- Imtiaz Khan as Girja Singh
- Gulshan Grover as Tagdu
- Shagufta Ali as Tinnie Rozario (Gary's sister)
- Mukesh Khanna as Majeed Lala Khan
- Dalip Tahil as Police Commissioner Shamsher Singh
- Usha Nadkarni as Gangu's mother
- Deepak Shirke as Pradhuman, Girja's brother
- Raza Murad as Chief Minister Prihvi Singh
- Razak Khan as Major Godbole
- Anurag Kashyap as Police Officer

== Production ==
Director Mazhar Khan had started the project in 1989 which faced years of delays due to his ill-health, scheduling issues and casting changes. Vinod Mehra was part of the cast when the film was launched but died in 1990. Amjad Khan was cast as the main villain but replaced by his brother Imtiaz Khan after his death in 1992. Mazhar Khan died on 16 September 1998 due to kidney failure, thus keeping the remaining production work on hold. However, in 1999, Mashkoor Chowdhry, the assistant worked on the film's remaining direction, technical aspects and leftover production.

== Soundtrack ==
Gang

Soundtrack album by Anu Malik R. D. Burman
- Released: 2000
- Genre: Feature film soundtrack
- Label: Universal Music India

The music of this movie was mainly composed by Anu Malik. R. D. Burman composed only one track, Chhodke Na Jana, sung by Asha Bhosle, for the film. But since the movie faced late release and his death, Mazhar Khan signed in Anu Malik for the composition. It can be noted that Anu Malik used some bits of the background score composed by Burman, of the movie, Caravan for the song Dil Hai Bechain in the late composer's remembrance. All of the songs are written by Javed Akhtar.

Song	Singer
"Meri Payal Bole"	Anu Malik, Alka Yagnik, Sunidhi Chauhan
"Ye Karo Ye Nahin"	Anu Malik, Abhijeet, Hariharan, Roop Kumar Rathod, Jolly Mukherjee
"Dil Hai Bechain"	Kumar Sanu, Sadhana Sargam
"Kyon Hum Tum Miley"	Anu Malik, Alka Yagnik
"Aaj Tu Maang Le"	Abhijeet, Hariharan, Roop Kumar Rathod, Jolly Mukherjee, Sadhana Sargam
"Chhodke Na Jaana"	Asha Bhosle

== Bibliography ==
- Blitz, Cine (25 July 2008). Cine Blitz, Volume 24, Issue 1. Blitz Publications.
- Basu, Anustup (13 September 2010). Bollywood in the Age of New Media: The Geo-televisual Aesthetic. Edinburgh University Press. ISBN 9780748643233.
