= Poonam Dhillon =

Indian actress

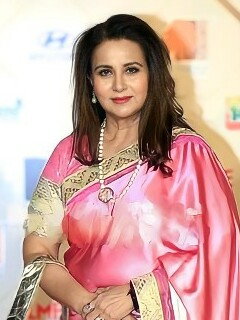
- Dhillon in 2024
- Born: 18 April 1962 (age 64); Kanpur, Uttar Pradesh, India
- Occupations: Actress, politician
- Years active: 1978–2022
- Spouse: Ashok Thakeria (m. 1988; div. 1997)
- Children: 2
- Website: Official website

Poonam Dhillon (born 18 April 1962) is an Indian actress and politician. A former Eve's Weekly Miss Young India 1978,she is best known for her 1979 film Noorie. Some of her well-known films include Red Rose (1980), Dard (1981), Romance (1983), Sohni Mahiwal (1984), Teri Meherbaniyan (1985) Samundar (1986), Saveraywali Gaadi (1986), Karma (1986), Naam (1986), Ek Chadar Maili Si (1986) and Maalamaal (1988).

Dhillon participated in Bigg Boss in 2009. She played the lead role of Sharda Modi in the Sony TV series Ekk Nayi Pehchaan in 2013. She has done theatre, including the award-winning play The Perfect Husband and The Perfect Wife with several shows in United States and Dubai.

== Career ==
Dhillon first gained fame when she was crowned Miss Young India 1978.

Director Yash Chopra offered her a role in the film Trishul (1978) where her song "Gapoochi Gapoochi Gum Gum" with Sachin Pilgaonkar became popular. Chopra then gave her the title role in Noorie (1979) opposite Farooq Shaikh, which he produced. The low budget film Noorie shot in Bhaderwah, Kashmir, became a superhit and was a phenomenal success at the box office, partly also for Khayyam's music. For this film, Poonam was nominated for the Filmfare Award for Best Actress.

Subsequently, she went on to act in around 90 films in Hindi, including Sohni Mahiwal, Red Rose, Teri Kasam, Dard, Nishana, Yeh Vaada Raha, Samunder, Romance, Kasam, and Sitamgar. She was paired with Rajesh Khanna in six films: Dard, Nishaan, Zamana, Awam, Red Rose (1980 film) and Jai Shiv Shankar. She made a special appearance in Judaai as a favour to producer Boney Kapoor when Juhi Chawla had to drop out.

She also appeared in regional films such as Nyay Danda (Bengali), Yuddha Kaanda (Kannada), Ishtam (Telugu) and Yavarum Nalam (Tamil), 13B: Fear Has a New Address (Hindi).

Dhillon was a contestant on Season 3 of Bigg Boss aired on Colors TV in 2009. She ended up as the second runner-up on the show. Her big comeback on Indian television in a lead role was with the serial Ekk Nayi Pehchaan on Sony TV in 2013 where she played the uneducated yet ideal wife of a rich businessman.

She has been in the Hindi theater production The Perfect Husband, which won the best comedy play award in 2005 and which completed a Golden jubilee run. She then did another play The Perfect Wife co-starring Sooraj Thapar and Pyaar Mein Kabhi Kabhi with Asif Sheikh. She was also seen in a play called U Turn which is the Hindi version of a Marathi play.

Dhillon ventured into the make-up van business in 1991 pioneering the concept in the Indian film industry. She runs a make-up van company called "Vanity."

== Personal life ==
Dhillon was born in Kanpur, Uttar Pradesh. Her father, Amreek Singh was an aeronautical engineer in the Indian Air Force and would often get transferred. Her mother was a school principal, and both her siblings are doctors. Poonam was quite studious growing up and aspired to become a doctor. Poonam attended Carmel Convent, Chandigarh for schooling and did her graduation after joining films at age 16.

Dhillon was married to producer Ashok Thakeria and has two children, a daughter Paloma. and a son Anmol.

== Activism and politics ==
She has been very active with social causes like drug awareness, AIDS awareness, family planning and organ donation.

She has been a prominent speaker at the SAARC business summits in Kathmandu and Delhi and was appointed cultural ambassador. She was also a speaker at the MINDMINE event. In 2012, she along with other celebrities participated in a show supporting the "Save and Empower the Girl Child" cause in collaboration with Lilavati Hospital.

In 2014, she launched an event management and film production company called "Poetic Justice Films and Entertainment Pvt. Ltd." with industrialist Aneel Murarka and choreographer Samir Tanna.

In 2017, Dhillon was appointed as one of four members to the Film Certification Appellate Tribunal, which is the official body for appeals against decisions of the Central Board of Film Certification in the Indian film industry.

Dhillon joined the Bhartiya Janta Party in 2004 and was appointed vice president of the Mumbai unit of the party in 2019.

== Filmography ==
=== Films ===
- Note: all films are in Hindi, unless otherwise noted.

Year	Film	Role	Notes
1978	Trishul	Kusum	Debut film
1979	Kaala Patthar		Guest appearance
1979	Noorie	Noorie	
1980	Red Rose	Sharda	
1980	Nishana	Kavita	
1981	Baseraa	Sarita	
1981	Aapas Ki Baat	Kajal	
1981	Dard	Poonam Bhargav	
1981	Main Aur Mera Haathi	Meena/Julie	
1981	Poonam	Poonam	
1981	Biwi-O-Biwi	Asha	
1982	Sawaal	Sonia	
1982	Teri Kasam	Dolly	
1982	Yeh To Kamaal Ho Gaya	Priya	
1982	Yeh Vaada Raha	Sunita	
1983	Nishan	Gulabo	
1983	Qayamat	Sudha	
1983	Romance	Sonia	
1984	Baadal		
1984	John Jani Janardhan	Cheryl Mendez	
1984	Laila	Laila	
1984	Sohni Mahiwal	Sohni	
1984	Yaadgar	Naini	
1985	Bepanaah	Kalpana	
1985	Geraftaar	Anuradha	
1985	Kabhi Ajnabi The	Asha	
1985	Shiva Ka Insaaf	Nisha	
1985	Sitamgar	Nisha	
1985	Tawaif	Kaynat Mirza	
1985	Teri Meherbaniyan	Bijli	
1985	Zamana	Sheetal	
1986	Avinash	Dr. Sapna	
1986	Dosti Dushmani	Lata	
1986	Ek Chadar Maili Si	Raji	
1986	Karma	Tulsi	
1986	Khel Mohabbat Ka	Lily/Shyamoli	
1986	Naam	Seema	
1986	Palay Khan	Zulekha Khan	
1986	Samundar	Anjali	
1986	Saveray Wali Gaadi	Jyoti	
1987	Himmat Aur Mehanat	Sharda	
1987	Awam	Sushma	
1987	Mard Ki Zabaan	Lata	
1988	Hum Farishte Nahin	Sunita	
1988	Kasam	Savi	
1988	Maalamaal	Poonam Malhotra	
1988	Sone Pe Suhaaga	Advocate Shraddha	
1989	Yuddha Kaanda	Sunita	Kannada film
1989	Batwara		
1989	Abhimanyu	Tulsi/Kelly	
1989	Galiyon Ka Badshah	Madhu	Delayed release
1989	Hisaab Khoon Ka	Anu/Anita	Double role
1989	Saaya	Supriya	
1990	Vidrohi	Kiran	
1990	Jai Shiv Shankar		Unreleased
1990	Amiri Garibi	Rani	
1990	Atishbaz		
1990	Pathar Ke Insan	Seeta	
1990	Police Public	Karuna	
1991	Deshwasi	Rakshya	
1991	Jhoothi Shaan		
1991	Qurbani Rang Layegi	Basanti	Delayed release
1997	Judaai	Nisha Kadoria	Guest appearance
1997	Mahaanta		Delayed release
2001	Ishtam	Lakshmi	Telugu film
2009	Dil Bole Hadippa!	Yamini Singh	
2009	13B	Sushma	
2011	Kunasathi Kunitari		Marathi film
2011	Miley Naa Miley Hum	Shalini Mehra	
2013	Ramaiya Vastavaiya	Ashwini Kapoor	
2014	Double Di Trouble		Punjabi film
2016	Salaam Mumbai	Karishma's mother	
2020	Jai Mummy Di	Pinky Bhalla	
2022	Plan A Plan B	Kiran	
2025	Jaggo Aayi Aa	Preetam Kaur	Punjabi film

=== Television ===
Year	Show(s)	Role	Notes
1995	Andaz	Pooja	
2000	The Chust Drust show	Host	
2002–2004	Kittie Party	Manju	
2009	Bigg Boss 3	Contestant	Second runner-up
2012–2014	Dil Diyan Gallan Dil Hi Jaane...	Bhupinder	Punjabi-language television series
2013–2014	Ekk Nayi Pehchaan	Sharda	
2015	Santoshi Maa	Herself / narrator	
2018	Dil Hi Toh Hai	Mamta Noon	
2018	Pratigya - Stand For a Cause	Host	
2021	Dil Bekaraar	Mamta Thakur	Web Series on Disney+ Hotstar

== Accolades ==
Award Year	Work	Award	Category	Result
1980	Noorie	27th Filmfare Awards	Best Actress	Nominated
2015	Ekk Nayi Pehchaan	Indian Telly Awards	Best Actress in a Supporting Role (Drama)	Won
