= Red Rose (1980 film) =

- Poster
- Directed by: Bharathi Rajaa
- Written by: Charandas Shokh (Dialogues)
- Screenplay by: Bharathi Rajaa
- Based on: Sigappu Rojakkal by Bharathi Rajaa
- Produced by: M.P. Jain; Ravi Kumar
- Starring: Rajesh Khanna; Poonam Dhillon
- Cinematography: P. S. Nivas
- Edited by: K. Balu
- Music by: R. D. Burman
- Production company: Gaurav Arts
- Release date: 23 May 1980
- Country: India
- Language: Hindi

Red Rose is a 1980 Indian Hindi-language psychological thriller film, starring Rajesh Khanna and Poonam Dhillon. It is a remake of the Tamil film Sigappu Rojakkal, made by the same director Bharathi Rajaa and the same cinematographer P. S. Nivas. The film was a box office failure.

== Plot ==
Anand is a successful businessman with a dark side. He preys on nubile girls, seduces and kills them. These proceedings are video-recorded and watched by his adoptive father and mentor, another deranged woman-hater who, as with Anand, had a disillusioning experience with the female sex in his past. The old man stays holed up in a far corner of Anand's mansion watching his son carry out what he is too infirm to do. The murdered girls are buried in Anand's garden and a rosebush is grown above them.

Anand chances upon an undergarments salesgirl, Sharda and develops an attraction for her. Sharda, a conservative woman, insists that Anand must marry her if he wants to have his way with her. The romance proceeds and appears to be Anand's salvation before things begin to collapse for him. On his marriage day, Sharada stumbles upon a diary containing details of his deranged life along with names of the girls he had killed scribbled on the walls of one of the rooms in his large house.

Sharda, meanwhile stumbles upon Anand's father, whom Anand had told her was retarded and was not to be disturbed and gets the shock of her life. She somehow manages to shut him in and tries to run out, but as she prepares to leave, Anand returns. As Sharda tries to act normal while planning to escape, Anand finds that his father has been locked in and when he saves his father, he realizes that Sharda knows the truth about his deeds. A tense chase ensues, which ends in a graveyard in the dead of night, with Anand stumbling and falling on a cross which pierces him. In the ensuing chase, Anand is caught by the police.

He is subsequently jailed, but becomes intellectually disabled and loses his bloodthirsty ways. He keeps repeating Sharda's name, as it is his only coherent thought and all other memories have been erased from his mind.

== Cast ==
- Rajesh Khanna as Anand
- Poonam Dhillon as Sharda
- Om Shivpuri as Shera
- Satyen Kappu as Anand's Foster Father
- Anjana Mumtaz as Anjana
- Shammi as Roopsagar Clothing Stores Manager
- Aruna Irani as Sheela
- Padmini Kapila as Chitra
- Master Mayur as Young Anand "Munna"
- Shashi Kiran as Waiter
- Roopesh Kumar as Inspector Bhushan
- Janagaraj as Servant

== Soundtrack ==
Music composed by R. D. Burman and lyrics were penned by Nida Fazli and Vitthalbhai Patel.

Song	Singer	Lyricist
"Kiski Sadaayen Mujhko Bulaayen"	Kishore Kumar, Asha Bhosle	Nida Fazli
"Tere Bin Jeena Kya, Tere Bin Marna Kya" (version 1)	Kishore Kumar, Asha Bhosle	Vitthalbhai Patel
"Tere Bin Jeena Kya, Tere Bin Marna Kya" (version 2)	Kishore Kumar, Asha Bhosle	Vitthalbhai Patel
"Tere Bin Jeena Kya, Tere Bin Marna Kya" (version 3)	Kishore Kumar, Asha Bhosle	Vitthalbhai Patel
