= Maalamaal =

- Poster
- Directed by: Kawal Sharma
- Written by: Charandas Shokh
- Produced by: Abhinav Anand
- Starring: Naseeruddin Shah; Poonam Dhillon; Mandakini; Satish Shah
- Cinematography: Pratap Sinha
- Edited by: Kawal Sharma
- Music by: Anu Malik
- Release date: 11 November 1988
- Running time: 139 minutes
- Country: India
- Language: Hindi

Maalamaal (transl. Rolling in Money) is a 1988 Indian Hindi-language comedy film directed by Kawal Sharma. It stars Naseeruddin Shah, Poonam Dhillon, Mandakini, Satish Shah.

Although it was not officially acknowledged, the film is based on the 1985 English movie Brewster's Millions which itself was based on the 1902 novel Brewster's Millions by George Barr McCutcheon. At least six films have been made based on the novel, besides a 1906 Broadway play. The film is also known for Sunil Gavaskar, the renowned cricketer, making a guest appearance in the film.

== Plot ==
Raj, a small-time cricketer, discovers that his grandfather has left him a property of ₹330 crore. The inheritance comes with the condition that he must spend ₹30 crore in 30 days. Raj has never seen so much money and has no idea how to spend it. He seeks the help of his friend Govinda Sakharam Godbole to do so. He has to face opposition from Chandar Oberoi, who is out to ruin Raj and takeover his business.

== Cast ==
- Naseeruddin Shah as Raj Saxena
- Poonam Dhillon as Poonam Malhotra
- Mandakini as Honey
- Satish Shah as Govinda Sakharam Godbole
- Dalip Tahil as Ghanshyam
- Aditya Pancholi as Chandar Oberoi
- Amjad Khan as Sulaiman Dada
- Harindranath Chattopadhyay as Mangatram
- Bharat Bhushan as Mangatram's Manager
- Praveen Kumar Sobti as Jallad Singh
- Sunil Gavaskar as Himself (Guest Appearance)
- Lalita Pawar as Gangu Bai
- Jankidas as Antique Shop Owner
- Yunus Parvez as Restaurant Owner
- Jack Gaud as Sulaiman's Goon

== Music ==
1. "Maal Hai To Taal Hai" - Kishore Kumar, Amit Kumar, Anu Malik, Sudesh Bhosle
2. "Maal Ko Dekhe" - Kishore Kumar, Amit Kumar, Anu Malik, Sudesh Bhosle
3. "Meri Raaton Mein" - Anu Malik, Alisha Chinai
4. "Pehla Pehla Pyar" - Anu Malik, Alisha Chinai
5. "Kal Na Aaya Hai Na Aayega" - Alisha Chinai
