= Mazhar Khan (actor, born 1955) =

Indian actor, producer and director

- Born: 22 July 1955; Bombay, Bombay State, India
- Died: 16 September 1998 (aged 43); Mumbai, Maharashtra, India
- Occupations: Actor; director; producer
- Spouses: Rubaina (Separated); Zeenat Aman
- Children: 3

Mazhar Khan (22 July 1955 – 16 September 1998) was an Indian film and television actor, producer and director. Khan made his debut with the film Sampark (1979), playing the role of Brindavan, but was better acclaimed for playing a street beggar in Shaan (1980). He made his debut as a producer with the film Bombay Fantasy (1983), and made his directorial debut with the film Gang (2000), released after Khan's death in 1998.

== Career ==
Mazhar made his debut in the film Sampark in 1979. He came into recognition with the 1980 film Shaan which was directed by Ramesh Sippy and co-starred Amitabh Bachchan and Shashi Kapoor. The song "Naam Abdul Hai Mera" from the film was picturized on Khan and became popular. He went on to appear in over 40 Hindi films playing villain and supporting roles throughout the 1980s and early 1990s. He also appeared in a Hollywood science fiction film titled Terminal Entry (1987) where he played one of the main villains. In 1984 he also acted in the television serial "Bombay Meri Jaan" with Madhuri Dixit but that serial was rejected by Doordarshan because of not having an impressive star cast. He was also noted for his role in the television serial Buniyaad (1987) which reunited him with director Ramesh Sippy. In 1989 he acted in the British mini-series Traffik.

His last film appearance was in the 1992 film Angaar after which he quit acting. He turned to producing and directing the multi-starrer film Gang which started production in 1990 and was delayed for many years. The film was released two years after his death.

== Personal life and death ==
Khan was married to Dilip Kumar's niece Rubaina from whom he had a son. After separating from her, he married actress Zeenat Aman with whom he had two sons. Mazhar died of kidney failure on 16 September 1998.

== Selected filmography ==
Year	Film	Role	Notes
1979	Sampark	Brindavan Biharilal	
1980	Shaan	Abdul	
1981	Dhanwan	Truck Driver	
1981	Roohi	Vijay	
1981	Dard	Ajit Saxena	
1981	Ek Hi Bhool	Teg Bahadur	
1982	Haathkadi	Robert	
1982	Arth	Hatish	
1982	Maine Jeena Seekh Liya	Suraj	
1983	Kalka	Kamu	
1984	Dharm Aur Qanoon	Bhurre	
1984	Bindiya Chamkegi	Rakesh	
1984	Sohni Mahiwal	Rashid	
1984	Wanted	Nathiya	
1985	Bhavani Junction	Rakesh (Ricky)	
1985	Haveli	Thakur Veer Singh	
1985	Shiva Ka Insaaf	Rahim	
1985	Ghulami	Thakur Jaswant Singh	
1985	Aandhi-Toofan	Balbir's Henchman	
1985	Bepanaah	Jack	
1985	Ameer Aadmi Gharib Aadmi	Brij aka Birju	
1985	Rahem Dil Jallad		
1985	Mujhe Kasam Hai	Mangal Singh	
1986	Nafrat	Ajay	
1987	Terminal Entry	Abdul	
1987	Buniyaad	Roshanlal	TV show
1987	Raat Ke Andhere Main	Amrit	
1987	Dak Bangla	Munna	
1987	Be-Sahara	Nilesh	
1988	Ek Naya Rishta	Sanjay Kumar	
1989	Traffik		TV mini-series
1990	Ek Number Ka Chor	ACP Vishal	
1992	Angaar	Farid Khan	
2000	Gang		Director
