= Teri Kasam =

- Poster
- Directed by: A. C. Tirulokchandar
- Screenplay by: A. C. Tirulokchandar; Gyandev Agnihotri
- Based on: Puguntha Veedu (1972)
- Produced by: Tito
- Starring: Kumar Gaurav; Poonam Dhillon; Girish Karnad; Ranjeeta
- Cinematography: Jal Mistry
- Edited by: Waman B. Bhosale, Gurudutt Shirali
- Music by: Rahul Dev Burman
- Release date: 28 May 1982
- Country: India
- Language: Hindi

Teri Kasam is a 1982 Indian Hindi-language film directed by A. C. Tirulokchandar and starring Kumar Gaurav, Poonam Dhillon, Girish Karnad, Ranjeeta and Nirupa Roy. It is a remake of the Tamil film Puguntha Veedu (1972).

== Plot ==
Dolly (Poonam Dhillon) has been brought up by her rich brother in the most lavish fashion. Tony (Kumar Gaurav) is from a poor family and studies in the same college as Dolly. He is in love with Dolly but is shy to admit it. Dolly however loves an unknown voice. When she learns that it is Tony's voice, she decides to marry him. But Tony refuses to marry unless his sister Shanti is married. So Dolly's brother marries Shanti. Dolly's arrogance creates tension in the lives of everyone. She disrespects Tony's mother and admits her to a general ward of a hospital. When Tony learns this, he is infuriated and leaves his wife and his job. He takes to singing as profession and becomes a famous singer. What follows is a tale of realization on Dolly's and Tony's part. It is all about rich-poor relations as shown in earlier films. And then humiliation which in turn causes the rise of a hero, as a successful singer.

== Cast ==
- Kumar Gaurav as Tony
- Poonam Dhillon as Dolly
- Girish Karnad as Rakesh
- Monty Nath as Monty
- Ranjeeta as Shanti, Tony's sister
- Nirupa Roy as Parvati, Tony's mother
- Kanchan Mattu as Dolly's friend
- Paintal as Tony's friend
- Rakesh Bedi as Tony's friend
- Mushtaq Merchant as Tony's friend
- Manmauji as Tony's friend
- Birbal as Hotel Manager

== Soundtrack ==
All songs of the movie were sung by Amit Kumar (including a duet song with Lata Mangeshkar) and became very popular.

Lyrics by Anand Bakshi

Song	Singer
"Hum Jis Raste Pe Chale, Us Raste Pe Thi Preet Khadi"	Lata Mangeshkar, Amit Kumar
"Geet Woh Hai, Haan Ji Haan"	Amit Kumar
"Yeh Zameen Gaa Rahi Hai"	Amit Kumar
"Dil Ki Baat Kahin Lab Pe"	Amit Kumar
"Kya Hua Ek Baat Par"	Amit Kumar
"Mere Geeton Mein"	Amit Kumar

== Awards & Nominations ==
30th Filmfare Awards:

Nominated

- Best Supporting Actor – Girish Karnad
- Best Supporting Actress – Ranjeeta Kaur
- Best Male Playback Singer – Amit Kumar for "Yeh Zameen Gaa Rahi Hai"
