= Puttinillu Mettinillu =

1973 film

- Poster
- Directed by: Pattu
- Story by: A. S. Prakasam
- Based on: Puguntha Veedu (1972)
- Produced by: M. Murugan; M. Kumaran; M. Saravanan; M. Balasubramanian; M. S. Guhan
- Starring: Krishna; Sobhan Babu; Lakshmi; Chandrakala
- Cinematography: S. Maruti Rao
- Edited by: R. Vittal
- Music by: Satyam
- Production company: AVM Productions
- Release date: 12 July 1973
- Country: India
- Language: Telugu

Puttinillu Mettinillu (transl. Your birthplace, your wife's birthplace) is a 1973 Indian Telugu-language family drama film directed by Pattu and produced by AVM Productions. It is a remake of the Tamil film Puguntha Veedu (1972), also directed by Pattu. The film was released on 12 July 1973.

== Cast ==
- Savitri as Ravi's mother
- Krishna as Gopinath "Gopi"
- Sobhan Babu as Ravi
- Lakshmi as Latha
- Chandrakala as Vasanthi
- V. Nagayya
- Raja Babu as Hanumanthu and Lingamurthy (dual role)
- Ramana Reddy as Telugu Lecturer
- Rama Prabha as Ammanni/Bhanu

== Production ==
Puttinillu Mettinillu was directed by Pattu, and produced by M. Murugan, M. Kumaran, M. Saravanan and M. Balasubramanian under AVM Productions. The story was written by A. S. Prakasam, and the dialogue by N. R. Nandi. Cinematography was handled by S. Maruti Rao, and the editing by R. Vittal. The art director was A. K. Sekhar, and the dance choreographers were Madurai Ramu and T. Jayaram.

== Soundtrack ==
The soundtrack was composed by Satyam.

Track listing
| No. | Title | Lyrics | Singer(s) | Length |
|---|---|---|---|---|
| 1. | "Idhe Pata Prathi Chota" | C. Narayana Reddy | S. P. Balasubrahmanyam |
| 2. | "Chinnari Kannayya" | Daasarathi Krishnamacharyulu | P. Susheela |
| 3. | "Idhe Pata Prathi Chota" (version 2) | C. Narayana Reddy | S. P. Balasubrahmanyam |
| 4. | "Boltha Paddave Pilladhana" | C. Narayana Reddy | S. P. Balasubrahmanyam |
| 5. | "Boltha Paddavu Bujji nayana" | C. Narayana Reddy | L. R. Eswari |
| 6. | "Sirimalle Sogasu Jabilli Velugu" | Daasarathi Krishnamacharyulu | P. Susheela, A. M. Rajah |
| 7. | "Jamalangidi Jamka" | Kosaraju Raghavaiah | S. P. Balasubrahmanyam, L. R. Eswari |
