= Danny Denzongpa filmography =

The following is the filmography of Danny Denzongpa, an Indian actor, singer, and film director.

== Filmography ==
=== 1970s ===
Year	Title	Role	Notes
1971	Mere Apne	Sanju	
1972	Zaroorat	Danny	
1972	Milap	Raju	
1972	Rakhi Aur Hathkadi	Raja	
1972	Yeh Gulistan Hamara		
1973	Nai Duniya Naye Log		
1973	Dhund	Thakur Ranjit Singh	
1973	Naya Nasha	Narrator	Uncredited
1973	Khoon Khoon	Raghav	remake of Dirty Harry
1973	Chalaak	Manoj	
1974	Ghatna		
1974	Khote Sikkay	Danny	
1974	Chor Machaye Shor	Raju Ustad	
1974	Ek Ladki Badnaam Si		
1974	Vada Tera Vada	Danny	
1974	36 Ghante	Dilawar Khan	
1975	Apne Rang Hazaar	Vicky	
1975	Zorro	Sher 'Sheroo' Singh	
1975	Dharmatma	Jangoora	
1975	Kaala Sona	Shera	
1975	Raftaar	Pramod Kumar	
1975	Ponga Pandit	Rocky	
1975	Mounto		
1975	Aakhri Dao	Robert	
1975	Rani Aur Lalpari	Himself	Special appearance
1976	Kalicharan	Shaaka	
1976	Fakira	Munna / Ajay / Toofan	
1976	Laila Majnu	Prince Bahksh	
1976	Sangram	Salim / Altaf	
1976	Gumrah	Ramesh	
1977	Abhi To Jee Lein	Danny	
1977	Aashiq Hoon Baharon Ka	Vikram (Jamunadas' son)	
1977	Paapi	Abdul	
1977	Chandi Sona	Bikram	
1977	Khel Khilari Ka		
1978	Naya Daur	Mark	
1978	Devata	Inspector Lawrence	
1978	Lal Kuthi	Dev	Bengali film
1979	Pehredaar		
1979	Griha Pravesh	Danny	
1979	Lahu Ke Do Rang	Suraj	
1979	Heera-Moti	Ajay / Moti	
1979	Aaj Ki Dhara	Danny	

=== 1980s ===
Year	Title	Role	Notes
1980	Kali Ghata	Kishore	
1980	Chunaoti	Thakur Ajay Singh	
1980	The Burning Train	Randhir	
1980	Choron Ki Baraat	Heera	
1980	Phir Wahi Raat	Ashok	Also director
1980	Abdullah	Khaleel	
1980	Bandish	Kapil Kumar	
1981	Bulundi	Lobo	
1981	Love Story	Ram Dogra	
1981	Hum Se Badkar Kaun	Raju / Johny	
1982	Kachche Heere	Arjun	
1982	Dial 100	Sangeet Samrat Shambhu Sen	
1982	Lakshmi	Jagdishchandra Mathur	
1982	Raj Mahal		
1982	Jeeo Aur Jeene Do	Inspector Jwala Singh	
1982	Do Ustad	Daku Badal Singh	
1983	Siskiyan		
1983	Kanku Ni Kimat		
1983	Ganga Meri Maa	Malan	
1983	Andha Kanoon	Akhbar Ali	
1983	Lovers	David	
1983	Mujhe Insaaf Chahiye	Dayashankar Ray	
1983	Mujhe Vachan Do	Jabbar Khan	
1983	Hum Se Hai Zamana	Karan Kalicharan	
1983	Naukar Biwi Ka	Himself	
1984	Boxer	Dharma	
1984	Farishta	Ustad	
1984	Dharm Aur Qanoon	Superintendent of Police Kader	
1984	Andar Baahar	Shera	
1984	Jagir	Danny	
1984	Manzil Manzil	Gautam (Pahadi Baba)	
1984	Karishmaa	Raja Saab	
1984	Meraa Dost Meraa Dushman	Shaitan Singh	
1984	Kanoon Kya Karega	Raghuvir Singh	
1984	Dilawar		
1984	Farishta		
1985	Paththar	Major Balwant Rai	
1985	Pyar Jhukta Nahin	Bhanu Pratap	
1985	Aitbaar	Inspector Barua	
1985	Aandhi Toofan	Balbir	
1985	Jawaab	Seth. Jagmohan	
1985	Yudh	Gama Maating / Mr. Chinoy	
1985	Maha Shaktiman	Maharudra	aka Maharudra
1985	Oonche Log	Thakur Maan Singh	
1985	Zulm Ka Badla	Shambhu / Bunty	
1985	Patthar Dil	Jung Bahadur	
1985	Ram Tere Kitne Nam	Himself	Uncredited
1986	Bhagwaan Dada	Shambu Dada	
1986	Chambal Ka Badshah	Sultan	
1986	Adhikar	Vishal's lawyer	Special appearance
1986	Allah Rakha		
1987	Itihaas	Alexander	
1987	Aag Hi Aag	Daulat Singh / Choudhury	
1987	Diljalaa	Ratanmuni Gupta	
1987	Kaun Kitney Pani Mein		
1987	Faqir Badshah	Vijay and Raja	
1987	Deewana Tere Naam Ka	Shambhu	
1988	Anjaam Khuda Jaane		
1988	Mardon Wali Baat	Raja Sunder Singh	
1988	Paap Ki Duniya	Pasha	
1988	Ek Hi Maqsad	Inspector. Deepak	
1988	Shoorveer	Shankar	
1988	Commando	Ninja	
1988	Soorma Bhopali		
1988	Janam Janam	Mukhiya	
1988	Yateem	Girivar Prasad Mathur	
1988	Zalzala	Sona Singh	
1988	Mera Shikar	Changez	
1988	Jeete Hain Shaan Se	J.P.	
1988	Gunahon Ka Faisla	Dacoit	
1988	Lahure	Narrator	Nepali film
1988	Saino	Mitjoo	Nepali film
1989	Ustaad	Shamsher Singh / DK	
1989	Sau Saal Baad		
1989	Saaya	Rakesh	
1989	Kasam Suhaag Ki	Lohari - Sultan's goon	
1989	Do Yaar		
1989	Jung Baaz	Mahakal	
1989	Khoj	Father Anthony	
1989	Shehzaade	Thakur Roshan Singh	Uncredited
1989	Paanch Paapi	Inder	
1989	Galiyon Ka Badshah	Inspector Vijay	

=== 1990s ===
Year	Title	Role	Notes
1990	Pyar Ke Naam Qurbaan	Prince Yeshwant Singh	
1990	Agneepath	Kancha Cheena	
1990	Shandaar	Dhaga	
1990	Gunahon Ka Devta	Raghuvir	
1990	Sheshnaag	Aghori	
1990	Jagira		
1990	Chingariyan		
1990	Shesh Naag		
1991	Woh Subah Kabhie To Aayegi		
1991	Sanam Bewafa	Sher Khan	
1991	Hum	Bakhtawar	
1991	Vishnu-Devaa	Thakur Shamsher Singh / Samppat	
1991	Yodha	Daaga / Justice Dharmesh Agnihotri	
1991	Lakshmanrekha	Birju	
1991	First Love Letter	Thakur Ajit Singh	
1992	Bahadur	Bahadur	Bengali film
1992	Khule-Aam	Insp. Uday Singh / Insp. Ranvir Singh Rathod	
1992	Khuda Gawah	Khuda Baksh	
1992	Bandhu	Bandhu	
1992	Balwaan	Bhaiji	
1992	Antham	J.P.Sethi	
1992	Kisme Kitna Hai Dum	Vijay Singh	
1993	Sangram	Madhu's father	
1993	Dhartiputra	Kripal Singh	
1993	Gurudev	Khakan	
1993	Tahqiqaat	Bhanu Pratap	
1993	Prateeksha	Dinesh Khanna	
1993	Jai Devaa		
1993	Bulund		
1994	Ajnabi	Captain	Doordarshan TV series; Episode: "Introductory"
1994	Chauraha	Baba Bhatti	
1994	Mohabbat Ki Arzoo	Jagpal Singh alias Jaggu dada	
1994	1942: A Love Story	Major Bisht	
1994	Krantiveer	Chatursingh	
1994	Vijaypath	Dilawar Singh	
1995	Faisla Main Karungi	Inspector Nadeem	
1995	Sarhad: The Border of Crime	Gundecha	
1995	Barsaat	ACP Neghi	
1996	Muthi Bhar Zameen	Thakur Raghuvir Singh	
1996	Rajkumar	Ali	
1996	Army	Naagraj	
1996	Shastra	Babu	
1996	Ghatak	Katya	
1996	Ram Aur Shyam	Tatar	
1997	Seven Years in Tibet	Regent	
1997	Udaan	Mr. Rana	
1997	Himalay Putra	Narsingh Rana	
1997	Dhaal	Advocate Diwan	
1998	Vinashak – Destroyer	Jailer Lankeshwar	
1998	Zulm O Situm	Sikander	
1998	China Gate	Maj. Ranjir Singh Gurung	
1999	Silsila Hai Pyar Ka	Jabbar Khargoshi	
1999	Kohram	Minister Virbhadra Singh	
1999	Dahek: A Burning Passion	Jabbar Bahkshi	

=== 2000s ===
Year	Title	Role	Notes
2000	Pukar	Abhrush	
2000	Tune Mera Dil Le Liya	Raja Sahab	
2001	Jagira		
2001	Officer	Dushyant Singh (after plastic surgery)	
2001	Officer	Pratap Rai (fake identity)	
2001	Lajja	Gajendra	
2001	Aśoka	Virat	
2001	Indian	Shankar Singhania	
2001	Moksha	Bachelor Simon	
2002	Yeh Mohabbat Hai	Aman Khan	
2002	16 December	Major General Vir Vijay Singh	
2002	Ab Ke Baras	CBI Officer Sikander Baksh	
2002	Soch	Nautiyal	
2004	Shikaar	Darshan Damania	
2004	Ab Tumhare Hawale Watan Saathiyo	Colonel Ashfaque Khan	
2005	Dil Jo Bhi Kahey...	Narrator	
2007	Hattrick	David Anna	
2007	Big Brother	Police Commissioner Kulkarni	
2007	Frozen	Karma	
2008	Chamku	Baba	
2008	Karzzzz	Kabira	
2009	Luck	Lakhan Tamang	
2009	Acid Factory	J.D. / Om / Sultan / Sarthak Sanghv / Inspector Balwant	

=== 2010s and 2020s ===
Year	Title	Role	Notes
2010	Enthiran	Professor Bohra	Tamil film
2013	Boss	Big Boss	
2014	Jai Ho	Home Minister Dashrath Singh	
2014	Bang Bang!	Omar Zafar 'Diamond smuggler'	
2015	Baby	Feroz Ali Khan	
2017	Naam Shabana	Feroz Ali Khan	Cameo appearance
2018	Bioscopewala	Rehmat Khan	
2019	Manikarnika: The Queen of Jhansi	Ghulam Ghaus Khan	
2022	Uunchai	Bhupen	Cameo
