= Hum Se Hai Zamana =

1983 film

- Promotional poster
- Directed by: Deepak Bahry
- Produced by: Deepak Bahry
- Starring: Mithun Chakraborty; Danny Denzongpa; Amjad Khan; Zeenat Aman; Kim; Kajal Kiran
- Music by: Raamlaxman
- Release date: 23 September 1983
- Running time: 125 minutes
- Country: India
- Language: Hindi
- Budget: ₹1.5 crore

Hum Se Hai Zamana is a 1983 Indian Hindi-language film, directed and produced by Deepak Bahry. It stars Mithun Chakraborty, Danny Denzongpa, Amjad Khan as lead heroes and Zeenat Aman, Kim, Kajal Kiran as their heroines respectively. Ranjeet has played the villain here. While the film did have a cast of well-known actors and actresses at the time, the movie ultimately failed to be a success at the box office.

== Plot ==
Tired of his older wife and son, the Thakur remarries a much younger woman, and throws his wife and son out of his palatial house. His employees, led by Kalicharan, go on a strike, demanding higher pay and benefits, which are unacceptable to the Thakur. He invites Kalicharan to meet with him, offers him money, and when Kalicharan refuses, he has him killed. His second wife gives birth to a baby girl, Nisha, and passes away. Years later, his past comes to haunt him when the sons of Kalicharan, Shiva and Karan, along with their widowed mother, seek revenge against him. To make matters worse, Nisha refuses to marry Ranjeet Ranvir Singh, the man Thakur has chosen for her, for she loves Shiva. The ultimate showdown is between the Thakur and his now grown son, Iqbal and Iqbal's lover and with Thakur's first wife.

== Cast ==
- Mithun Chakraborty as Shiva
- Danny Denzongpa as Karan
- Amjad Khan as Iqbal
- Zeenat Aman as Nisha
- Kim as Sona
- Kajal Kiran as Chhutki
- Ranjeet as Ranjeet Singh
- Kamal Kapoor as Thakur Pratap Singh
- Shreeram Lagoo as Kalicharan
- Pinchoo Kapoor as Ranveer Singh

== Reception ==
The movie was rated a 6.5/10 by IMDb.

While its cast was full of stars at the time, the film ultimately did not perform well at the box office, and the movie was a flop.

The movie brought more credibility to actress Kim, a rising star who starred in films such as Disco Dancer and Naseeb the year before. She was famed for her acting as Sona, and for her bikini scene in the film where she makes a failed escape attempt from a river after being pursued by bandits.

== Soundtrack ==
Hum Se Hai Zamana

Soundtrack album by Ram Laxman
- Released: 1983
- Genre: Bollywood
- Director: Raamlaxman

Track listing

Song	Singer
"Gustakhi Maaf Ho, Ae Jaan-E-Jahan"	Kishore Kumar, Asha Bhosle
"Hum Se Hai Zamana"	Lata Mangeshkar
"Kolaba Kuiba Kuiba Kuiba"	Lata Mangeshkar
"Tere Naam Ki Deewani"	Asha Bhosle
"Tainu Mainu Vekhe Zamana, Tu Jo Sadda Yaar Ho Gaya"	Asha Bhosle, Amit Kumar
