= Boxer (1984 film) =

1984 Bengali sports film by Raj N. Sippy

- Promotional poster
- Directed by: Raj N. Sippy
- Screenplay by: Jyoti Swaroop
- Dialogues by: Bengali: Tirtha Chatterjee; Hindi: Vinay Shukla
- Produced by: Gautam Guha
- Starring: Mithun Chakraborty; Rati Agnihotri; Danny Denzongpa; Tanuja; Sharat Saxena; Parikshit Sahni
- Cinematography: Anwar Siraj
- Edited by: Waman Bhosle; Guru Dutt Shirali
- Music by: R. D. Burman
- Production company: Shri Sai Shakti
- Release dates: 27 January 1984 (Bengali); 17 February 1984 (Hindi)
- Running time: 164 minutes
- Country: India
- Languages: Bengali; Hindi

Boxer (/ˈbɒk.sər/) is a 1984 Indian bilingual sports action film directed by Raj N. Sippy. Simultaneously shot in Bengali and Hindi-languages, the film is produced by Gautam Guha under the banner of Shri Sai Shakti. It stars Mithun Chakraborty, Rati Agnihotri, Danny Denzongpa, Tanuja and Sharat Saxena. In the film, Shankar Ghoshal (Chakraborty), son of a retired boxer, trains under a manager while serving an unjust prison sentence, in order to challenge the reigning champion Raghu Raj (Saxena).

In spite of its basic storyline being inspired by John G. Avildsen's 1976 film Rocky, it also borrows partial basis from Moti Nandi's novel Shiba. Music of the film is composed by R. D. Burman. The film was a box-office success, grossing over ₹6 crore against a total budget of ₹2 crore, and also gained a cult following over the years.

== Plot ==
Dharma works as a boxer with Kashmir Silk Mills. The managing director is very pleased with him, and assures him that if he will win the next boxing bout against Shera, he will be sent to London. Unfortunately, Dharma loses the bout, he is grievously injured, unable to box anymore, and shortly thereafter, he is fired from his job. Thereafter an embittered Dharma takes to drinking alcohol in a big way, ignoring his pregnant wife, Savitri, & young son, Shankar. Things get worse when Savitri gives birth to a second baby boy, Sonu. Then in order to make ends meet, Shankar takes to stealing, and hiding from the law. Years later, Shankar, now a career criminal, is arrested for stealing a watch from a man coming out of a jewellery store, he is tried in court and sentenced to jail for 6 months. In prison, he meets with boxing manager, Tony Braganza, and after his release, he starts to train with him and eventually challenges the reigning Champion Raghu Raj.

== Cast ==
- Mithun Chakraborty as Shankar Ghoshal, Dharma and Savitri's son
- Rati Agnihotri as Rajni
- Danny Denzongpa as Dharma, Shankar and Sonu's father
- Tanuja as Savitri, Shankar and Sonu's mother
- Parikshit Sahni as Tony Braganza, Boxing Trainee
- Sujit Kumar as Inspector Khatau, Rajni's father
- Naaz as Mrs. Khatau, Rajni's mother
- Iftekhar as Rushie, who is provoked for killing Shankar to Raghuraj
- Sudhir as Gafoor
- Sharat Saxena as Raghuraj, Boxer
- Raju Shrestha as Young Shankar
- Yusuf Khan as Jail Inmate Rival of Shankar
- Gurbacharan Singh
- Azaad Irani
- Jagdish Raj
- Master Nadeem as Sonu Dharma
- Baby Pinky
- Shekhar Purohit
- Bob Christo
- Sunder Taneja
- Vikas Sahane

== Music ==
The music was composed by R. D. Burman with Bengali and Hindi lyrics respectively by Gauriprasanna Mazumder and Gulshan Bawra. The Bengali song "Neshar Ghore Ki Bolte Ki", sung by Manna Dey reworked the starting line from the song "Ta Bole Ki Prem Debo Na", composed by Nachiketa Ghosh from the 1975 film Mouchak, also sung by Dey and penned by Mazumder. In Hindi, the song "Hai Mubarak Aaj Ka Din" was a chartbuster.

=== Bengali ===
Track listing
No.	Title	Singer(s)	Length
1.	"Mushtimeyo Kojon E To Mushtijoddha Hoy"	Kishore Kumar	5:30
2.	"Kichhu Kotha Mone Thak Lukono"	Kishore Kumar, Asha Bhosle	4:32
3.	"Neshar Ghore Ki Bolte Ki"	Manna Dey, Kavita Krishnamurthy, Neeta Sen	5:00
4.	"Asbe Notun Atithi"	Aarti Mukherji	4:30
Total length:			19:32

=== Hindi ===
Track listing
No.	Title	Singer(s)	Length
1.	"Dekho Idhar Jaano Jigar"	Kishore Kumar	5:37
2.	"Tere Dil Mein Bhi Kuchh Kuchh"	Kishore Kumar, Asha Bhosle	4:26
3.	"Hai Mubarak Aaj Ka Din"	Hariharan, Kavita Krishnamurthy, Vanita Mishra	5:14
4.	"Apne Ghar Me Ek Naya Mehmaan Aane Wala Hai"	Vanita Mishra	4:04
Total length:			19:26

== See also ==
- List of boxing films
