= Tripti Nadakar =

Indian actress

- Born: Tripti Nadakar; 2 January 1969 (age 57); Darjeeling, India
- Occupation: Actress
- Years active: 1983–2009
- Height: 1.69 m (5 ft 7 in)

Tripti Nadakar (Nepali: तृप्ती नाडकर; born 2 January 1969) is a Nepali actress who worked in Nepali cinema. She was born to a Marathi father and a Nepalese mother from Darjeeling. She has performed in more than a dozen Nepali films. Her hit movies were Samjhana, Kusume Rumal, Saino and Lahure. She and Bhuwan K.C. were dubbed the first golden couple of Nepali film industry. Nadakar was paid Rs. 150,000 to act in Saino.

== Filmography ==
Year	Title	Starring
1983	Samjhana	Bhuwan K.C., Tripti Nadakar
1985	Kusume Rumal	Bhuwan K.C., Tripti Nadakar, Udit Narayan
1988	Saino	Danny Denzongpa, Bhuwan K.C., Rakshya Mark
1989	Lahure	Shrawan Ghimire, Tripti Nadakar, Tulsi Ghimire
1992	Koseli	Shrawan Ghimire, Krishna Malla
2004	Aama Ko Kakh	Rajesh Hamal, Tripti Nadakar, Nikhil Upreti
2006	Duniya	Bhuwan K.C., Tripti Nadakar, Nikhil Upreti, Niruta Singh
2009	Kusume Rumal 2	Tripti Nadakar, Niraj Baral, Usha Rajak, Rubi Bhattarai

== Awards ==
- 2007, Best Supporting Actress, Nepali Film Award 2064, Aama Ko Kakh

== See also ==
- saino
- Kusume Rumal
- laure (film)
