= Kim Yashpal =

Indian actress and model

- Born: Satyakim Yashpal; India
- Occupations: Actress; model
- Years active: 1979–1993

Satyakim Yashpal, known professionally as Kim and Kim Yashpal, is an Indian retired actress and model. After a brief stint in modeling, her acting debut was Danny Denzongpa's horror film Phir Wahi Raat (1980). She followed this with supporting roles in the drama film Bulundi and Manmohan Desai's masala film Naseeb (both 1981), and a leading role in Babbar Subhash's blockbuster dance film Disco Dancer (1982).

In the later years of her career, Kim primarily performed in special appearance songs and guest spots, with the exception of Subhash's action film Commando (1988). She retired from the film industry in 1993, and has stayed out of the media.

== Career ==
Kim's early years in her career consisted of modeling, in which she appeared on the covers of various magazines, such as Star & Style magazine. She began acting in 1979, making an appearance in the lost film Pehredaar.

In 1980, Kim starred in Danny Denzongpa's psychological horror-film Phir Wohi Raat as Asha, a young woman who suffers traumatic experiences. The film performed well at the box office.

In 1981, Kim starred in Manmohan Desai's multi-starrer movie Naseeb, which was the second highest-grossing film of the year. She also starred in Esmayeel Shroff's crime film Bulundi as the sister of Raaj Kumar's character of a professor.

In 1982, Kim played Rita Oberoi, the daughter of a criminal, in the Hindi film Disco Dancer. The highest-grossing Indian film of its year, it became the first Indian film to gross over ₹100 crore worldwide and was the highest-grossing Indian film until 1994, being surpassed by Hum Aapke Hain Koun. Its accompanying soundtrack was also successful; the song "Jimmy Jimmy Aaja Aaja", which was picturised on Kim, became her best-known item number. The film has become influential in popular culture.

In 1983, Kim appeared in Deepak Bahry's action film Hum Se Hai Zamana as Sona, the girlfriend of Danny Denzongpa's character.

Kim starred as Padmini in K S R Swamy's action film Maha Shaktimaan, and was also cast as Monica in Raj N. Sippy's film Andar Baahar, and as Soniya and Rashmi in Dilawar. She later appeared in Babbar Subhash's film Commando, as Jhum Jhum, and in Baaghi: A Rebel for Love in a guest appearance; both films were commercially successful.

Kim retired from the film industry in 1993. Her last films were guest roles in Pratikar, Honeymoon, Balwaan, Muskurahat, and Bulund. She also appeared in a song for Chandra Mukhi, however it was later deleted.

== Personal life ==
Following her retirement, Kim stayed out of public media and press. She was in a relationship with Danny Denzongpa during the 1980s.

== Filmography ==
Year	Film	Role	Notes
1980	Phir Wahi Raat	Asha	
1981	Bulundi	Leena Khurana	
1981	Naseeb	Kim	
1982	Prohari		Bengali film
1982	Disco Dancer	Rita Oberoi	
1983	Hum Se Hai Zamana	Sona	
1984	Sardaar	Anitha	
1984	Andar Baahar	Monica	
1984	Shapath	Dancer	Cameo appearance
1985	Maha Shaktimaan	Padmini	
1985	Maa Kasam	Dancer / Singer	Cameo appearance
1986	Krishna Nee Begane Baro	Rukmini	Kannada film
1986	Kismetwala	Dancer	Cameo appearance
1988	Ek Hi Maqsad	Dancer / Singer	Cameo appearance
1988	Commando	Jhum Jhum	
1988	Gharwali Baharwali	Beena Mehra	
1989	Gentleman		
1990	Gunahon Ka Devta	Dancer	Cameo appearance
1990	Baaghi		
1991	Pratikar	Miss Ruby	
1992	Honeymoon	Dancer	Cameo appearance
1992	Balwaan	Dancer / Singer	Cameo appearance
1992	Muskurahat	Dancer	Cameo appearance
1993	Bulund		
1993	Chandra Mukhi	Dancer	Cameo appearance (deleted)

== See also ==
- List of Indian film actresses
