= Yashpal (disambiguation) =

Yashpal (1903–1976), was a Hindi-language author.

Yashpal may also refer to:

== Surname ==
- Kim Yashpal, Indian actress and model

== See also ==
- Yash Pal (1926–2017), Indian scientist, educator and educationist
