= Muralidhar =

Muralidhar is a name. People with the name include:

- Srinivasan Muralidhar
- Muralidhar Goud
- Muralidhar Rao
- Kambadur Muralidhar
- Muralidhar Mane
- Muralidhar Jena
- Korivi Muralidhar

== See also ==
- Meanings of minor-planet names: 21001–22000#m570 for 21570 Muralidhar
