= Hariharan =

Hariharan may refer to:

- Hariharan (singer) (born 1955), Indian ghazal and playback singer from Thiruvananthapuram
- Hariharan (director), Indian film director in Malayalam cinema
- Githa Hariharan (born 1954), Indian author and editor
- Hariharan Srinivasan (1929–2015), Indian orthopedic surgeon
- K. Hariharan (disambiguation), several people
- Krishna Hariharan (born 1955), Indian Test cricket umpire
- Hariharan Krishna (born 1998), Singaporean Indian athlete
- Sruthi Hariharan (born 1989), Indian actress and model

== See also ==
- Harihara, fused Hindu deity of Vishnu (Hari) and Shiva (Hara)
- Harihara (poet), 12th-century Indian poet
- Harihar, city in Karnataka, India
  - Harihar (Vidhan Sabha constituency)
- Harihara I, Vijayanagara emperor
- Harihara II, Vijayanagara emperor
