= Nuggehalli Raghuveer Moudgal =

Indian biologist, and endocrinologist 1931 - 2011

- Born: 4 March 1931; Mysore state, British India
- Died: 8 May 2011 (aged 80); Dublin, California, USA
- Education: University of Bombay; University of Madras; University of California, Berkeley; St Mary's Hospital Medical School
- Known for: Studies on gonadotropin
- Awards: 1975 B. C. Guha Award; 1976 Shanti Swarup Bhatnagar Prize; SBCI Sreenivasayya Memorial Award; 1984 Sanjay Gandhi Award for Science and Technology
- Scientific career
- Fields: Biochemistry; Endocrinology
- Workplaces: AIIMS Delhi; Indian Institute of Science
- Doctoral advisor: Choh Hao Li; Rodney Robert Porter
- Doctoral students: Kambadur Muralidhar

Nuggehalli Raghuveer Moudgal (4 March 1931 – 8 May 2011) was an Indian reproductive biologist, endocrinologist and the chairman of the Department of Biochemistry and dean of Faculty of Science at the Indian Institute of Science. He was known for his pioneering researches on gonadotropin and was an elected fellow of the Indian Academy of Sciences and the Indian National Science Academy. He was an associate of noted scientists, Choh Hao Li and Rodney Robert Porter and discovered the role of hormones in generating immune response in living beings, during his association with the former. The Council of Scientific and Industrial Research, the apex agency of the Government of India for scientific research, awarded him the Shanti Swarup Bhatnagar Prize for Science and Technology, one of the highest Indian science awards for his contributions to Medical Sciences in 1976.

== Biography ==
Crawford Hall, University of Mysore

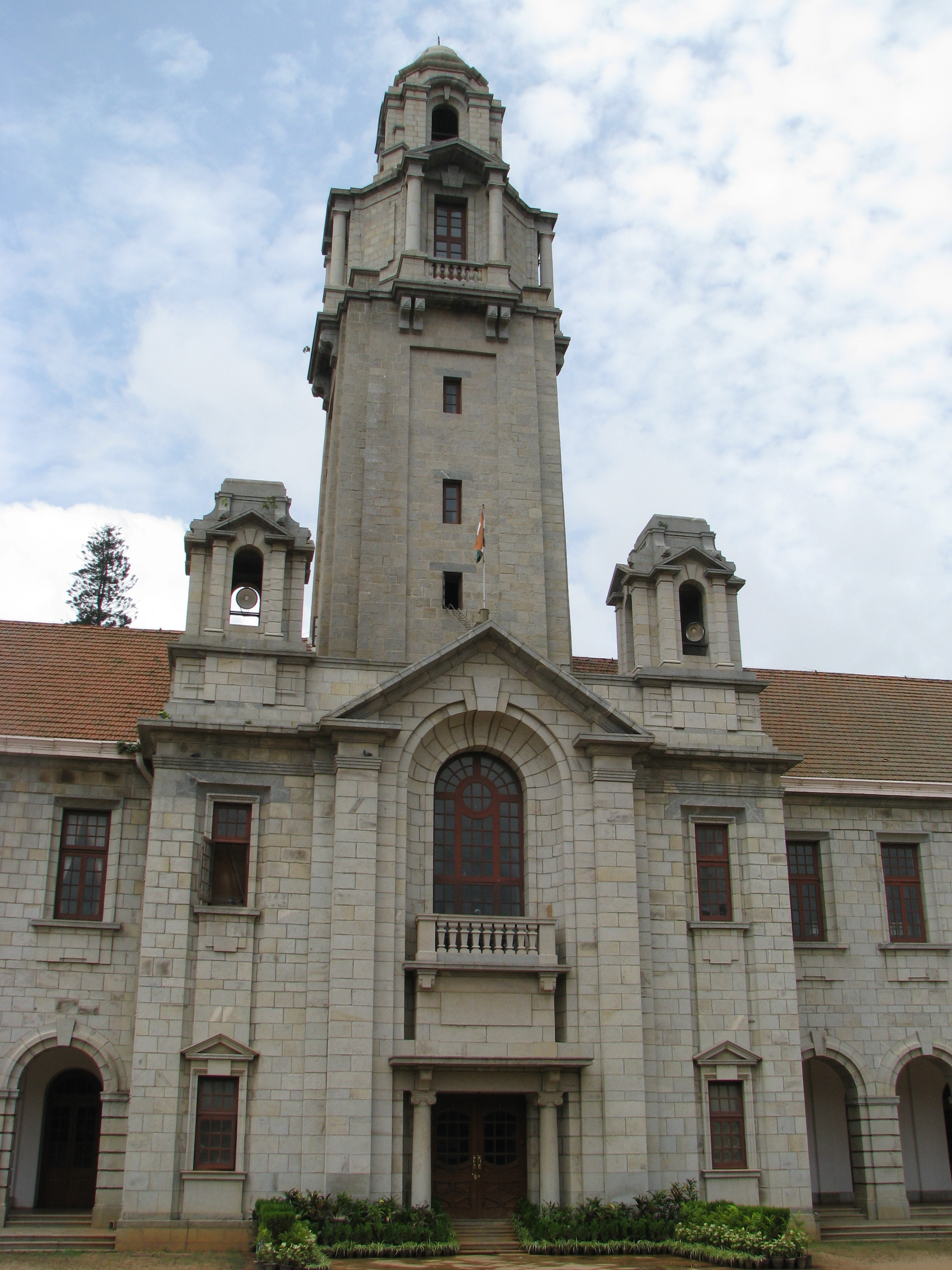
Indian Institute of Science

Raghuveer Moudgal was born on 4 March 1931 in Mysore, in the south Indian state of Karnataka, in a Hindu family to Vaidehi, a homemaker and N. Narasimha Moudgal, an electrical engineer with the State Electricity Board who reportedly contributed significantly to the electrification of the erstwhile Mysore state. He was the youngest of their three boys and two girls. (Note: His brothers were N. Shyam Prasad and N. Ram Prasad while Prabha Devi Anantram and Harini Madhava Rao were his sisters.) His early schooling was at Seshadripuram High School, Bengaluru where he passed the matriculation in 1946. He moved to Kolhapur to complete his graduate studies at the University of Bombay in 1950, staying at his elder sister's house. Opting for a research degree for his post graduate studies, he joined the University of Madras and earned an MSc for his researches on the biochemistry of thyroid hormones. Continuing in Chennai, (Note: Chennai was then known as Madras) he pursued his doctoral studies under the guidance of P. S. Sarma, a noted biochemist, and secured a PhD in 1957. He went to the University of California, Berkeley in the US for his post-doctoral studies and worked as a post-doctoral fellow at the laboratory of Choh Hao Li, a Chinese-born US biochemist who would later describe the structure of somatotropin, a pituitary growth hormone.

In 1961, he moved out of the US to continue his post-doctoral work in the UK at St Mary's Hospital Medical School, London on a Wellcome Trust fellowship. There, he joined the wards of Rodney Robert Porter, Nobel laureate biochemist, (Note: Porter shared the Nobel Prize in Physiology or Medicine with Gerald Edelman in 1972.) and spent a year at Porter's laboratory. On his return to India, he joined the All India Institute of Medical Sciences, Delhi as a CSIR Pool Officer. It was during this period his doctoral adviser, P. S. Sarma, invited him to join the Indian Institute of Science (IISc) as an assistant professor. At IISc, he continued his researches with the assistance of a grant from Ford Foundation and in 1969 he received an invitation from R. O. Greep of Harvard University for collaborative research. Moudgal stayed at Harvard for two years to supervise the work of Greep's Group and returned to IISc in 1971. He based his subsequent researches at the institute, simultaneously working as an associate professor and later as a professor. At the time of his retirement from official service in 1993, he was holding the positions of the Chairman of the Department of Biochemistry and the Dean of the Science Faculty. Post retirement, he continued to be associated with IISc as an INSA senior scientist and an honorary professor.

Moudgal was pursuing his doctoral studies at Madras University when he married Biligiri Rao née Prapulla in 1957. The couple had two sons, Pradeep and Madan, and a daughter, Priya. Towards the later part of his life, he suffered from cancer and underwent treatment in the US. He succumbed to the disease on 8 May 2011, at a hospital in Dublin, California, survived by his children, their spouses and grandchildren; his wife predeceased him in 2008.

== Legacy ==
Steroidogenesis

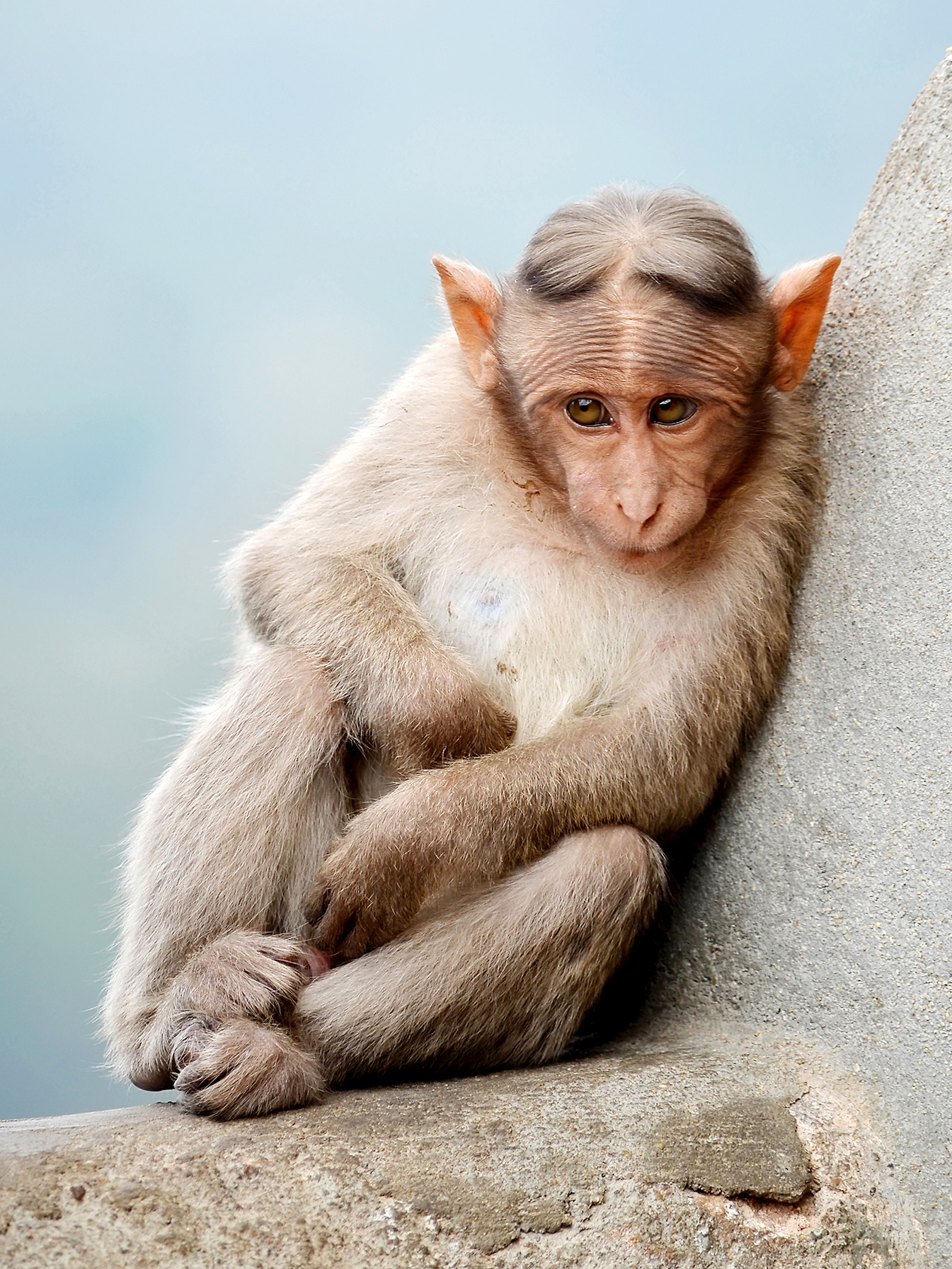
Bonnet macaque

Moudgal's early researches at the University of Madras were on the biochemistry of thyroid hormones but he shifted his focus to pituitary gonadotropins during his days at Choh Hao Li's laboratory at the University of California, Berkeley when he established that the hormones generated immune response in living beings and the discovery was reported to be a significant one as the belief till then was the principal function of the hormones was reproduction. Later, at Rodney Porter's laboratory in London, he worked on the role of cellulose as a carrier for immobilization of antibodies. Back in India, he expanded the scope of his researches to cover wider aspects of reproductive biology for which he established a Primate Research Laboratory at IISc in 1965, which was the largest primate house in the country at that time. Working on the macaques in his primate house, he discovered that sialidase from the kidney of the primate acted as an inhibitor of follicle stimulating hormone (FSH), a hormone responsible for pubertal development. He conducted elaborate studies on the molecular mechanism of Luteinizing Hormone (LH), a hormone which has significant role in ovulation and testosterone production, and elucidated the unfolding of LH binding to LH receptors in the target cell which was detailed in one of his articles, Effect of ICSH on Early Pregnancy in Hypophysectomized Pregnant Rats, published in Nature in 1969. He discovered that neutralizing LH resulted in neutralization of several reproductive functions such as ovulation, implantation, and gestational progress and the discovery opened a new methodology in immunocontraceptive technology. Later, he furthered his investigations on hormone actions by using antibodies as probes. His findings reportedly prompted R. O. Greep of Harvard University to invite him for collaborative research and Moudgal supervised the work of Greep's Group at his laboratory. At Harvard, he also collaborated with W. R. Moyle and established the presence of Luteinizing hormone/choriogonadotropin receptors on tumor cells in the testicles for the first time, which they revealed in an article, Specific binding of luteinizing hormone to Leydig tumor cells, published in the Journal of Biological Chemistry in 1971. He used these tumor cells for further investigations on Hormone-Receptor interactions, Cyclic adenosine monophosphate (cyclic AMP) production and steroidogenesis and experimentally demonstrated the extent of coupling and response with regard to cyclic AMP production and steroid output. (Note: Earl Wilbur Sutherland Jr. won the Nobel Prize in Physiology or Medicine in 1971 for his discovery of cyclic AMP as secondary messengers.)

Bonnet macaques raised by him at Primate Research Laboratory (Note: The laboratory housed around 400 primates.) made it handy for Moudgal in carrying out researches on follicle stimulating hormone in the primates and he discovered that immuno-neutralization of circulating FSH decreases the semen count, leading to oligozoospermia or azoospermia, but did not adversely affect libido. He successfully replicated the experiments in rodents as well and suggested FSH as an immunocontraceptive protocol. However, the researches could not be furthered due to laws related to preparation of protein-based pharmaceuticals. Still, his studies widened the understanding of conditions such as follicular maturation, atresia, spermatogenesis, primate reproduction and lactational amenorrhea. The pioneering work carried out by him led to the Indian Council of Medical Research recognizing his laboratory at IISc as a Centre for Advanced Research in Reproductive Biology, which as since been upgraded as Department of Molecular Reproduction and Developmental Genetics (MRDG). He documented his researches by way of several articles (Note: Please see Selected bibliography section) and his work has been cited by a number of authors and researchers. Besides, he edited two books, Gonadotropins and Gonadal Function and Perspectives In Primate Reproductive Biology and contributed chapters to many texts edited by others. He presented a research paper, Gonadotropins and Their Antibodies, at the Laurentian Hormone Research Conference (LHRC) held at Mont Tremblant, Canada in August 1973, thus becoming the first Indian scientist to present a paper at LHRC. He also guided over 30 doctoral and post-doctoral scholars in their studies and two of them, Addicam Jagannadha Rao and Appaji Rao, are emeritus professors of IISc. His niece, Mrinalini Rao, whom he mentored, is a distinguished scientist at the University of Illinois.

== Professional associations ==
Moudgal, who was the secretary of the Society of Biological Chemists (India) from 1967 to 1969, served as the secretary-general of the Federation of Asian and Oceanian Biochemists (FAOB) during 1972–75 and was a member of the Endocrine Society and the Society for the study of Reproduction, both US-based societies. He was one of the founders of the Indian Society for the Study of Reproduction and Fertility and served as its first president. He organized an International Symposium on gonadotropins which was attended by some of the major names in the field of reproductive biology including Malur R. Narasimha Prasad, Gursaran Talwar, Sardul Singh Guraya, Fernand Labrie and Om P. Bahl. He was a member of the task force of the World Health Organization for research in human reproduction for a number of years, sat in the editorial board of Molecular and Cellular Endocrinology and was the founding editor of Journal of Biosciences. He also served as the editor of Frontiers in Bioscience.

== Awards and honors ==
Moudgal received the B. C. Guha Award in 1975, the same year as he was elected as a fellow by the Indian Academy of Sciences. The Council of Scientific and Industrial Research awarded him Shanti Swarup Bhatnagar Prize, one of the highest Indian science awards in 1976. He received the Sreenivasaya Memorial Award from the Society of Biological Chemists (India) of the Indian Institute of Science in 1978 and he was selected for the Homi Bhabha Fellowship of the Homi Bhabha Foundation the same year. The Indian National Science Academy elected him as their fellow in 1979 and he received the Sanjay Gandhi Award for Science and Technology in 1984. The award orations delivered by him include the 1996 Yellapragada Subbarow Birth Centenary Lecture of the Indian National Science Academy. The Indian Society for the Study of Reproduction and Fertility has instituted an annual oration, Prof. N. R. Moudgal Memorial Oration and an award, Prof. N. R. Moudgal Young Scientist Awards in his honor. His biography has been included in the volume 40 of the Biographical memoirs of fellows of the Indian National Science Academy.

== Selected bibliography ==
=== Books ===
- Moudgal, N. R.; International Union of Biochemistry; Federation of Asian and Oceanian Biochemists (1974). Gonadotropins and gonadal function. New York: Academic Press. ISBN 9780125088503. OCLC 1009533.
- N. R. Moudgal; K. Yoshinaga; A. J. Rao; P. R. Adiga (1991). Perspectives in primate reproductive biology. New Delhi: Wiley Eastern. ISBN 978-8122403183. OCLC 28427737.

=== Chapters ===
- Proceedings. University of California, Hormone Research Laboratory. 1975.
- G.P. Talwar (6 December 2012). Contraception Research for Today and the Nineties: Progress in Birth Control Vaccines. Springer Science & Business Media. pp. 258–. ISBN 978-1-4612-3746-4.
- Choh Hao Li (2 December 2012). Gonadotropic Hormones. Elsevier. pp. 182–. ISBN 978-0-323-16027-8.
- Bernard Jaffe (2 December 2012). Methods of Hormone Radioimmunoassay. Elsevier Science. pp. 196–. ISBN 978-0-323-16126-8.
- G.P. Talwar (6 December 2012). Contraception Research for Today and the Nineties: Progress in Birth Control Vaccines. Springer Science & Business Media. pp. 258–. ISBN 978-1-4612-3746-4.
- T. A. Bewley; Lin Ma; Janakiraman Ramachandran (1975). Proceedings of the International Workshop on Hormones and Proteins: (1974) [i.e. 1973]. Chinese University of Hong Kong.
- Satish Kumar Gupta (1999). Reproductive Immunology. Springer Science & Business Media. pp. 346–. ISBN 978-0-7923-5923-4.
- Roy O. Greep (22 October 2013). Recent Progress in Hormone Research: Proceedings of the 1973 Laurentian Hormone Conference. Elsevier Science. pp. 70–. ISBN 978-1-4832-1950-9.

=== Articles ===
- Moudgal, R. N.; Mukku, V. R.; Prahalada, S.; Murty, G. S.; Li, C. H. (August 1978). "Passive immunization with an antibody to the beta-subunit of ovine luteinizing hormone as a method of early abortion—a feasibility study in monkeys (Macaca radiata)". Fertility and Sterility. 30 (2): 223–229. doi:10.1016/S0015-0282(16)43464-3. ISSN 0015-0282. PMID 98358.
- Jeyakumar, M.; Moudgal, N. R. (September 1996). "Immunization of male rabbits with sheep luteal receptor to LH results in production of antibodies exhibiting hormone-agonistic and -antagonistic activities". The Journal of Endocrinology. 150 (3): 431–443. doi:10.1677/joe.0.1500431. ISSN 0022-0795. PMID 8882162.
- Moudgal, N. R.; Murthy, G. S.; Prasanna Kumar, K. M.; Martin, F.; Suresh, R.; Medhamurthy, R.; Patil, S.; Sehgal, S.; Saxena, B. N. (March 1997). "Responsiveness of human male volunteers to immunization with ovine follicle stimulating hormone vaccine: results of a pilot study". Human Reproduction (Oxford, England). 12 (3): 457–463. doi:10.1093/humrep/12.3.457. ISSN 0268-1161. PMID 9130740.
- Moudgal, N. R.; Jeyakumar, M.; Krishnamurthy, H. N.; Sridhar, S.; Krishnamurthy, H.; Martin, F. (July 1997). "Development of male contraceptive vaccine—a perspective". Human Reproduction Update. 3 (4): 335–346. doi:10.1093/humupd/3.4.335. ISSN 1355-4786. PMID 9459279.
- Shetty, G.; Krishnamurthy, H.; Krishnamurthy, H. N.; Ramachandra, S. G.; Moudgal, N. R. (October 1997). "Use of norethisterone and estradiol in mini doses as a contraceptive in the male. Efficacy studies in the adult male bonnet monkey (Macaca radiata)". Contraception. 56 (4): 257–265. doi:10.1016/S0010-7824(97)00136-4. ISSN 0010-7824. PMID 9408708.
- Aravindan, G. R.; Moudgal, N. R. (January 1998). "Susceptibility of sperm chromatin to acid denaturation in situ: a study in endogenous FSH-deprived adult male bonnet monkeys (Macaca radiata)". Archives of Andrology. 40 (1): 29–41. doi:10.3109/01485019808987925. ISSN 0148-5016. PMID 9466000.
- Shetty, G.; Krishnamurthy, H.; Krishnamurthy, H. N.; Bhatnagar, A. S.; Moudgal, N. R. (July 1998). "Effect of long-term treatment with aromatase inhibitor on testicular function of adult male bonnet monkeys (M. radiata)" (PDF). Steroids. 63 (7–8): 414–420. doi:10.1016/S0039-128X(98)00042-7. ISSN 0039-128X. PMID 9654648. S2CID 15618014.

== See also ==
- Follicle-stimulating hormone
- Human chorionic gonadotropin
- Bonnet macaque
- Folliculogenesis
