= Saino =

- Saino sound track cover
- साईनो
- Directed by: Ugyen Chopel
- Written by: Danny Denzongpa
- Produced by: Malati Rai
- Cinematography: Munir Khan
- Edited by: Mahendra
- Music by: Ranjit Gazmer
- Production company: Triple Jem Movies
- Distributed by: Music Nepal
- Release date: 12 March 1988
- Country: Nepal
- Language: Nepali

Saino (Nepali: साईनो) is a 1988 Nepali film directed by Ugyen Chopel. It starred Danny Denzongpa, Bhuwan K.C., and Tripti Nadakar in lead roles. The music of the film was composed by Ranjit Gazmer. Danny Denzongpa wrote the story of the film and Tulsi Ghimire scripted the dialogues. The film's success led to its remake of a Hindi film Bandhu. A TV serial titled Ajnabee was also made that was based on Saino.

== Film ==
Tripti is married to Akaash and they have a son Binu. Fed up with their lives in another country, they move to their own homeland. They live happily there. One day, when Akaash visits the city, he meets a lady named Asha. Slowly, they begin an illegitimate relationship. The news comes to Tripti that her husband died in an accident and his dead body is brought home. Tripti carries on with her life with Binu until Danny comes to stay at her house. Danny develops a strong friendship with Binu.

A bad guy named Madan Babu has an evil eye on Tripti. He tries to force Tripti to be his wife but he does not succeed as Danny stops him. This doesn't stop Madan Babu, so he tries to provoke the villagers about their relationship and plans to banish Tripti from the village. Danny gives the villagers an answer and proves that Madan is a bad guy. The villagers beat up Madan and his goons.

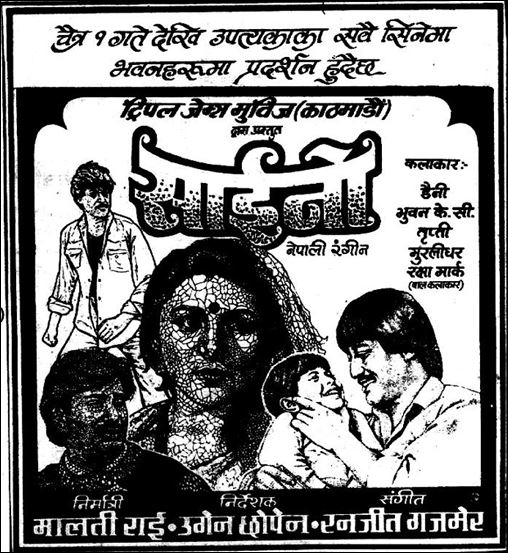
Saino Poster on Gorkhaptra dated 2044 Falgun 30 Sunday March 13, 1988

An old lady tells them they might have to face more Madan, so it would be better for them to marry or leave the village. As Danny is about to approach Tripti, the police arrest Danny telling Tripti that he killed her husband. Danny is shocked to learn that Tripti is the wife of the man he had killed because he had caught the man and his wife Asha making love. Asha too was killed for betraying him. Danny asks Tripti to forgive him and tells her how his wife betrayed him. After this, he leaves the house. Tripti forgives him and tells him that she and her son Binu will wait for him.

== Cast ==
- Danny Denzongpa as "Mitjoo"
- Bhuwan K.C. as Aakash
- Tripti Nadakar as Tripti
- Muralidhar as Madan Babu
- Rakshya Mark as Binu

== Soundtrack ==
Saino

Soundtrack album by Ranjit Gazmer
- Genres: Feature film soundtrack, Nepali Folk - Burman Melody
- Producer: Manohari Singh

Ranjit Gazmer composed scores with a special element of Rahul Dev Burman which he learned from him .

No.	Title	Singer(s)	Length
1.	"Suna Katha Euta Geet"	Danny Denzongpa	5:38
2.	"Naya Naya Sajau Hai Sansar"	Udit Narayan, Asha Bhosle	5:15
3.	"Aamai Le Bhanthe Dhara Ko Pani"	Danny Denzongpa, Udit Narayan, Kumar Kancha, Muralidhar	4:59
4.	"Pheri Aayo Tyo Kalo Raat"	Asha Bhosle	4:29
5.	"Jyaurey"	Danny Denzongpa, Deepa Jha	6:18
6.	"Suna Katha Euta Geet (another version)"	Danny Denzongpa	3:35
