= Yuksom Breweries =

Brewery based in Sikkim, India

- Industry: Alcoholic beverage
- Founded: 1987; 39 years ago
- Headquarters: Sikkim
- Products: Beer
- Website: www.yuksombreweries.com

Yuksom Breweries is a brewery based in Sikkim, India. The brewery sells three million cases of beer every year and is the third largest beer brand in India. The brewery is managed by famous Hindi film actor Danny Denzongpa and his family.

The company also owns a brewery in Odisha and the Rhino Brewery in Assam.

== Beers ==
The Yuksom Breweries produces the following brews:

- DANSBERG DIET (Premium Strong Beer)
- DENZONG 9000 (Strong Beer)
- JHOOM (Indian Premium Lager Beer)
- HIMALAYAN BLUE (Premium Lager Beer)
- INDIA SPECIAL (Premium Strong Beer)
- DANSBERG 16000 (Super Strong Beer)
- HEMAN 9000 (Ultra Super Strong Beer)
- YETI (Special Export Lager Beer)
- DANSBERG RED (Super Strong Beer)
- HIT (Super Strong Beer)
- INDIA SPECIAL (Quality Beer).

== See also ==
- Beer in India
