= Bandish (1980 Indian film) =

- Poster
- Directed by: K. Bapaiah
- Written by: V. C. Guhanathan; Charandas Shokh
- Based on: Chilipi Krishnudu by Acharya Athreya
- Produced by: D. Rama Naidu
- Starring: Rajesh Khanna; Hema Malini; Danny Denzongpa; Bindiya Goswami; Tanuja; Om Prakash; G. Asrani; Preeti Ganguly
- Cinematography: A. Vincent
- Music by: Laxmikant–Pyarelal
- Production company: Suresh Productions
- Distributed by: Suresh Productions
- Release date: 7 November 1980
- Country: India
- Language: Hindi

Bandish (aka Bandhish) (lit. 'Restriction') is a 1980 Hindi-language film directed by K. Bapaiah, starring Rajesh Khanna, Hema Malini and Danny Denzongpa. The movie is a commercial attempt by D. Rama Naidu, who had earlier produced Prem Nagar with the same lead pair on 1974. The music is by Laxmikant–Pyarelal. The film was the 8th highest grosser of the year. The film was appreciated for its colorful locations and sets, and for its melodious songs and unique story. The film was a remake of the Telugu film Chilipi Krishnudu.

== Differences from Telugu version ==
There were changes made to the script in the Hindi version Bandish at the insistence of Rajesh Khanna;

- In the Telugu version, the elder brother of the hero tries to rape the first sister and to escape that, the first sister kills herself. In the Hindi version, the elder brother of the hero kills his father-in-law by pushing him towards a running train, which is seen by the elder sister and hence, he captures her and gives her an injection to let her die.
- The villagers complaining to the mother about the second sister going missing and being in love with the doctor is not in the Hindi version.
- The mother of the twin girls regaining her eyesight is not shown in the Hindi version.
- The scene of the mother of the twin girls knowing that the elder sister Madhu is actually dead is not shown in Hindi version.
- There is no dream sequence in the Hindi version.

== Plot ==
Kishan is the spoilt son of a rich businessman. He is a medical student, for whom the life is all about playing pranks and troubling the people around. Finally, he is taught a lesson in humility by fellow student, Madhu. He undergoes a dramatic change in outlook and falls in love with her. Kishan promises his father, that he will marry Madhu and on the day of engagement, while Madhu is on her way to meet Kishan, she becomes the only witness to a murder of an individual, who happened to be father-in-law of Kapilkumar. On her death-bed, Kishan promises Madhu that he would kill whoever is responsible for the death. But his joy is short-lived as Kapilkumar kills Madhu. Kishan is devastated and carries on a manhunt for Kapil Kumar. He finally recognizes Kapil on a train and in the ensuing scuffle, Kapil pushes Kishan off the running train. When Kishan regains consciousness, he is amazed to see Madhu. Madhu lives in the village with her mother Ratnamani. On following her, he realizes that she is the twin sister of Madhu named as Chanchal, who always talks about the characters of films. Chanchal soon understands that Madhu and Kishan had loved each-other and that Madhu has expired. Hence, Chanchal decides to go missing and comes back to the village as Madhu. He then starts practising medicine in their small village as this was what Madhu wanted to do. With time, both are drawn towards each other until one day, Kapil is in front of them once again. In the village he meets a woman, who asks Kishan to save her husband, who has been shot by a bullet. Kishan soon realises that the woman's husband is Kapil and refuses to help, but the woman insists that he is a doctor and must save the patient. Kishan manages to save him, but has to cut a hand of Kapilkumar. Kapilkumar gets angry at his wife for getting him treated from Kishan and runs away to search for Kishan and attack Kishan. What Kishan does not know is that Kapil is his elder brother who was separated when they were young. Later, he learns that their father had a worker at their home, who had decided to take one of the children with a birthmark on the right hand, to use the child for his business. On realising that Kishan is his brother, Kapilkumar accepts his mistake and fights with his boss Om Shivpuri to save his kidnapped father Om Prakash and to save Chanchal and Kishan. Kishan ensures that no one dies and manages to defuse the bomb kept by Om Shivpuri. Kapilkumar apologises to his wife for killing her father, and goes to jail.

== Reception ==
The box office collections were Rs. 2.90 crores in 1980. It received four stars in the Bollywood guide Collections.

== Cast ==
- Rajesh Khanna as Kishan
- Hema Malini as Madhu / Chanchal (Double Role)
- Bindiya Goswami as Shanti
- Danny Denzongpa as Kapil Kumar / K.K.
- Tanuja as Chanda (Kapil Kumar's Wife)
- Om Prakash as Kishan & Kapil's Father
- Asrani as Murli
- Padmini Kapila as Lily
- Pinchoo Kapoor as College Principal
- Preeti Ganguly as Dumpko
- Manorama as Mrs. James
- Madan Puri as Chanda's father
- Jagdish Raj as Inspector
- Nalini Jaywant as Ratnabai, Chanchal's mother
- Jeevan as Vaidya Kriparam
- Mohan Choti as Bhola
- Om Shivpuri as Brijmohan
- Yusuf Khan as henchman of Brijmohan

== Music ==
| # | Song | Singer |
|---|---|---|
| 1 | "Main Kaun Hoon" | Lata Mangeshkar |
| 2 | "Saiyaanji Ne Ghar Banwaaya" | Asha Bhosle |
| 3 | "Mere Hosh Le Lo, Deewana Bana Do" | Kishore Kumar, Asha Bhosle |
| 4 | "Rang Bhare Mausam Se Rang Churaake" | Kishore Kumar, Asha Bhosle |
| 5 | "Arey Bhaago, Arey Daudo | Kishore Kumar, Asha Bhosle |
| 6 | "Instrumental" | Laxmikant–Pyarelal |
