= Lahure (film) =

- Lahure Songs Cover
- Directed by: Tulsi Ghimire
- Produced by: Kanchenjunga Films
- Cinematography: Binod Pradhan
- Music by: Ranjit Gazmer
- Release date: 1989
- Country: Nepal
- Language: Nepali

Lahure (लाहुरे; lit. 'Lahore', transl. India) is a 1989 Nepali film directed by Tulsi Ghimire under the banner of Kanchanjanga films. It starred Shrawan Ghimire, Tripti Nadakar and Tulsi Ghimire. The music of the film was composed by Ranjit Gazmer. Binod Pradhan was the cinematographer. It was mostly shot in India at Namchi, South Sikkim and Darjeeling. The film was the biggest commercial success at the Nepalese box office at the time and celebrated 151 days in theatres.

== Plot ==
Lahure is based on the story of the brave Gorkha soldiers in the Indian Army and the sacrifices made by them and their families.

== Cast ==
- Tripti Nadakar
- Shrawan Ghimire
- Pradip Pakhrin
- K. B. Moktan
- C. K. Tamang
- Archana Singh (Suchitra Singh)
- Tulsi Ghimire
- Kuki Sinha
- Bhaichung
- Laxmi Pradhan

== Crew ==
Director	Tulsi Ghimire
Producer	Shrawan Ghimire
Story	Tulsi Ghimire
Screenplay	Tulsi Ghimire
Dialogue	Tulsi Ghimire
Chief Ass. Director	Bharati Ghimire, Dayaram Dahal
Cinematographer	Binod Pradhan
Editor	Tulsi Ghimire
Lyricist	Tulsi Ghimire, Kusum Gazmer
Music director	Ranjit Gazmer
Playback Singer	Suresh Kumar, Shrawan Ghimire, Deepa Gahatraj, Asha Bhosle, Bharati Ghimire, Narayan Gopal
Choreographer	Bharati Ghimire
Background Score	Ranjit Gazmer

== Soundtrack ==
No.	Title	Singer(s)	Length
1.	"Birta Ko Chino Bir Ko Santan"	Narayan Gopal	5:34
2.	"Pahada Ko Mathi Mathi"	Narayan Gopal, Asha Bhosle	5:00
3.	"Chiya Bari Ma"	Deepa Jha	4:47
4.	"Basa Hai Ama"	Various artists	6:03
5.	"Sawane Jharima Tyo Gaun"	Asha Bhosle	6:48
Total length:			27:32
