= Chandra Mukhi =

- Film poster
- Directed by: Debaloy Dey
- Written by: Anwar Khan
- Story by: Salman Khan
- Produced by: Bubby Kent
- Starring: Sridevi; Salman Khan; Pran; Gulshan Grover; Mohnish Behl; Puneet Issar
- Edited by: Mukhtar Ahmed
- Music by: Anand–Milind
- Release date: 22 October 1993
- Running time: 152 minutes
- Country: India
- Language: Hindi

Chandra Mukhi is a 1993 Indian Hindi-language romance action fantasy film directed by Debaloy Dey starring Sridevi, Salman Khan, Mohnish Behl and Pran.

== Summary ==
Chandra Mukhi tells the story of Chandra Mukhi, a princess of a heavenly kingdom, who comes down to earth in search of her lost magical leaf. A boy named Raja, who is being abused by his uncle, meets Chandra Mukhi and sets on an adventure.

Rai, Raja's grandfather, is old and had already written a will that when Raja grows up, only then the wealth will go to Raja's hand, Raja is brought up by Madan, who kidnaps Raja to avoid the wealth going to Raja, and daily tortures Raja with his gang. The gang consists of Tony and two other men. Madan's wife, Kamini is also helping Madan by leaking all the secrets of Rai.

Chandramukhi is the adventurous daughter of goddess who loves the natural beauty of Earth and so, she goes down to earth and visits the beautiful places on earth though the goddess warns her as she don't know the suffering of being in earth but Chandramukhi is unbothered and so keeps again visiting the earth. On one such visit zhola fights with her and so the golden leaf, used to enter heaven, gets lost.

Thus, Chandramukhi lands in the nearby place where Raja lives, Raja gives her shelter and the name Chandramukhi is given accidentally, when all boys tell their name and seeing the tv Hindi film, one character tells the name Chandramukhi, so seeing that, as she repeats the name, Raja starts calling Chandramukhi.

Raja is getting tortured and the plan of Madan is all seen and understood by Chandramukhi. She then turns raja while sleeping into a strong, young man. Raja now grown big, is not recognised by Madan who tries to beat Raja, thinking he's kidnapped Raja. But Raja, now a strong man, fights everybody down. Kamini one day pushes down Rai from a hilly roadside to kill Rai, who is later shown to be rescued by a black magic gang and Raja with Chandramukhi comes here and takes away Rai who now is shown half mad. Rai later while talking with Raja tells he is not mad as he was acting to find out the secret as who all were his enemies and asks Raja to know where his grandson is, but Raja tells he is the boy Raja

This time Chandramukhis mother goddess appear as a bright light and convinces Rai only Raja can save Chandramukhi and stop the evil Zhola from destroying earth. Madan and his gang with help of a black magician finds out Raja is not small boy now and has help from Chandramukhi and traps Chandramukhi and here Raja fights but Zhola changes appearance and takes away Chandramukhi with him, Zhola gets the golden leaf and now stronger ties Chandramukhi and also plans to kill everyone of that place, Madan suddenly has a change of heart and starts supports Raja and Chandramukhi to destroy Zhola and begs pardon to Rai at end, Raja and Chandramukhi together fights and destroy Zhola and gets the golden leaf back. Chandramukhi gets back to heaven.

The film ends showing Raja in a big chair of the company, 18 years later, and Chandramukhi walks in as the new secretary assistance and both have a happy laugh .

== Cast ==
- Sridevi as Chandra Mukhi
- Salman Khan as Raja Rai
- Pran as Rai (Raja's grandfather)
- Gulshan Grover as Madan (Raja's Uncle)
- Mohnish Behl as Tony
- Puneet Issar as Zhola
- Tinnu Anand as Santala
- Kunickaa Sadanand as Lily
- Maya Alagh as Chandra Mukhi's mom
- Asha Sachdev as Kamini Rai
- Tej Sapru as Ghunga
- Shiva Rindani as Bob
- Avtaar Gill as Yakeemo
- Rana Jung Bahadur as Ved
- Kim Yashpal as special appearance in song (deleted song)

== Soundtrack ==
No.	Title	Singer(s)	Length
1.	"Aa Paas Aa To Zara"	S. P. Balasubrahmanyam, Kavita Krishnamurthy	05:02
2.	"Tune Pakdi Kalai"	Renu Mukherjee	04:03
3.	"Chha Raha Hai Pyaar Ka Nasha"	Kumar Sanu, Alisha Chinai	06:55
4.	"Maine Pilayee Ke Tune Pilayee"	S. P. Balasubrahmanyam	04:17
5.	"Mere Honthon Pe Ek Kahani"	Anand (Anand–Milind, Kavita Krishnamurthy	08:39
6.	"Tere Dil Ki Baat Main Janoo"	Kumar Sanu, Alka Yagnik	05:20
7.	"Teri Hi Aarzoo Hai"	S. P. Balasubrahmanyam, Kavita Krishnamurthy	05:54
8.	"Ding dong bell Ding dong bell Apna hai Main" (Deleted song)
