= Bulundi =

1981 film by Esmayeel Shroff

- Film Poster
- Directed by: Esmayeel Shroff
- Written by: Moinuddin
- Screenplay by: Esmayeel Shroff; Santosh-Tahir
- Produced by: Mohan Rao
- Starring: Raaj Kumar; Asha Parekh; Danny Denzongpa; Kim
- Cinematography: Rusi Billimoria
- Edited by: Rajoo
- Music by: R. D. Burman
- Production company: Shreekala Arts
- Release date: 30 January 1981
- Running time: 161 mins
- Country: India
- Language: Hindi

Bulundi is a 1981 Hindi-language crime, thriller and drama film starring Raaj Kumar, Asha Parekh, Danny Denzongpa, Kim in pivotal roles. It was directed by Esmayeel Shroff and its music was composed by R. D. Burman. The film was declared a hit upon release by Box office India. It was remade in Tamil as Nermai (1985).

== Plot ==
Professor Satish Khurana lives with his wife Sarla and sister Leena and enjoys a high reputation in the college where he is employed. One day, his friend Viju Mohanty requests him, via phone, to meet a rich businessman, Ranjeet Singh Lobo, to teach his son Manjeet private tuition. Satish, at first hesitates, but after meeting with Ranjeet, he accepts it. Manjeet was punctual in anything, but initially arrogant and disobedient, but after meeting with Satish he improved. Seeing this, Ranjeet's friends Madan Teja and Babulal Bhakri also request Satish for private tuition for their sons Vikram and Pawan respectively. After that, Satish is accused of divulging the questions via private tuition and is fired. Now, Satish doesn't know the background of Ranjeet, Madan and Babulal as he learns that they want to utilize him for their illegal work.

== Cast ==
- Raaj Kumar as Professor Satish Khurana
- Asha Parekh as Sarla Khurana
- Danny Denzongpa as Ranjeet Singh Lobo / Manjeet Singh Lobo (dual role)
- Kim as Leena Khurana
- Raj Kiran as Vikram "Vicky" Teja
- Kulbhushan Kharbanda as Viju Mohanty
- Kader Khan as Madan Teja
- Jeevan as Babulal Bhakri
- Krishan Dhawan as Bhanodaya Khatri
- Rakesh Bedi as Pawan Bhakri
- Bharat Kapoor as Harish
- C. S. Dubey as Professor
- Helen as item dancer in bar in song "Tera Dil O Re Babu"
- Siddharth Kak as Inspector Salim

== Soundtrack ==
Lyricist: Majrooh Sultanpuri

Song	Singer
"Abhi To Hum Hue Jawan"	Kishore Kumar
"Kaho Kahan Chale, Jahan Tum Le Chalo"	Kishore Kumar, Asha Bhosle
"Hum Jab Ek Saath Hai Phir Yeh To Koi Daur Nahin"	Mohammed Rafi, Asha Bhosle
"Ab Raat Ho Gayi Jawan, Gesu Kamar Tak Dhale, Naghme Sunake Pyar Ke, Kar De Savera Manchale"	Mohammed Rafi, Asha Bhosle, Amit Kumar, Dilraj Kaur
"Tera Dil O Re Babu"	Asha Bhosle
"Dil Se Dil Mile"	R. D. Burman
