= Kambadur Muralidhar =

Indian biologist

- Born: 25 December 1948 (age 77); Coimbatore, India
- Education: Osmania University, Indian Institute of Science
- Known for: Buffalo Hormones
- Scientific career
- Fields: Biology
- Workplaces: University of Delhi, University of Hyderabad, South Asian University
- Doctoral advisor: N. R. Moudgal

Notes
- Biochemical Endocrinology of the Indian water buffalo

Kambadur Muralidhar or K. Muralidhar is an Indian biologist, known for his work in biochemistry, endocrinology and reproductive biology. He taught at Delhi University for over thirty years, and was Head of its Department of Zoology. Currently, he is Jawaharlal Nehru Chair Professor, School of Life Sciences, University of Hyderabad. He is a Fellow of the Indian National Science Academy, the Indian Academy of Sciences and the National Academy of Sciences, India. He is also highly regarded as a teacher and educator, and has contributed to biology education at both high school and college levels.

== Early life ==
Kambadur Muralidhar was born on 25 December 1948 in Coimbatore, Tamil Nadu. After early schooling in several different places in Tamil Nadu and Andhra Pradesh, he graduated from St John's High School, Bellary, Karnataka. He obtained his Bachelor's and master's degrees in chemistry from Osmania University, Hyderabad. He went to the Indian Institute of Science, Bangalore, for his doctoral studies, where he worked with the well-known biochemist and endocrinologist N. R. Moudgal, and completed his Ph.D. in 1976. For his doctoral work, he was awarded the Professor K. V. Giri Memorial Gold Medal.

== Career ==
In August 1976, immediately after completing his Ph.D., Muralidhar joined the faculty of the newly established University of Hyderabad as Lecturer. After a postdoctoral stint at SUNY, Buffalo, New York, he moved to the University of Delhi as Reader in 1983. Subsequently, he became Professor. In 1989 and 1990, he had visiting assignments at the M D Anderson Cancer Center, Texas, USA. He was Head, Department of Zoology, during 2001–2004. After his retirement in December 2013, he joined South Asian University, New Delhi, as J. C. Bose National Fellow. In January 2017 he moved back to the University of Hyderabad as Jawaharlal Nehru Chair Professor.

== Role as educator ==
Apart from his work as a researcher, Muralidhar is highly regarded as a teacher and educator. He advocates an integrated approach to the teaching of biology at both high school and college level, which he has elaborated in an interview. He has also articulated his views on the nature of science and its relation to biology education in a lecture, published by INSA as part of the volume Frontier Lectures in Biology. He was the Chairman of a UGC committee for curricular reform in Zoology, and authored a report that is considered to be a benchmark. He was also the Chief Advisor of the biology textbooks published by NCERT in 2006–2008.

== Awards and honours ==
- Professor K V Giri Memorial Gold Medal
- Fellow, Indian National Science Academy (elected 1995)
- Fellow, National Academy of Sciences, India (elected 1995)
- Fellow, Indian Academy of Sciences (elected 1998)
- Jawaharlal Nehru Chair Professor, University of Hyderabad (2017)
