= Disco Dancer =

1982 Indian film by Babbar Subhash

- Theatrical release poster
- Directed by: Babbar Subhash
- Written by: Dr. Rahi Masoom Reza; Deepak Balraj Vij
- Produced by: Babbar Subhash
- Starring: Mithun Chakraborty; Kim; Om Puri; Geeta Siddharth; Rajesh Khanna
- Cinematography: Nadeem Khan
- Edited by: Mangesh Chavan; Shyam Gupte
- Music by: Bappi Lahiri
- Production company: B. Subhash Movie Unit
- Release date: 17 December 1982
- Running time: 135 minutes
- Country: India
- Language: Hindi
- Budget: ₹2 crore
- Box office: est. ₹100.68 crore

Disco Dancer is a 1982 Indian dance-action film, written by Rahi Masoom Raza and directed by Babbar Subhash. The film stars Mithun Chakraborty and Kim in leading roles, with Om Puri, Gita Siddharth, Karan Razdan in supporting roles with Rajesh Khanna in a special appearance.

The film tells the rags-to-riches story of a young street performer from the slums of Bombay. The film is known for its filmi disco Bollywood songs, composed by Bappi Lahiri and lyrics written by Anjaan and Faruk Kaiser. Popular songs include "Jimmy Jimmy Jimmy Aaja" sung by Parvati Khan, "I am a Disco Dancer" sung by Vijay Benedict, "Yaad Aa Raha Hai" sung by Bappi Lahiri, and "Goro Ki Na Kaalo Ki" sung by Suresh Wadkar with Usha Mangeshkar.

The film was a worldwide success, with its popularity extending across Asia, the Soviet Union, Eastern Europe, the Middle East, Turkey, and Africa. Disco Dancer was also the second highest-grossing film ever in the Soviet Union and the highest-grossing foreign film. Disco Dancer established Mithun as a household name wherever the film went well, with Jimmy becoming a more popular name for Chakraborty. The soundtrack album was also a success, going Platinum in India and receiving a Gold Award in China. Adjusted for inflation, it is still one of the highest-grossing Indian films of all time.

== Plot ==
Anil, a street performer and wedding singer from the slums of Bombay, is scarred by the memory of the rich P. N. Oberoi beating his mother in an incident during his childhood. When manager David Brown is fed up with the tantrums of current Indian disco champion Sam and looks for some new talent, he happens to see Anil dance-walking across a street. Rebranded as 'Jimmy', the rising disco star must take the throne from Sam and win the heart of Rita, Oberoi's daughter.

All seems to be going well until Oberoi hires men to connect Jimmy's electric guitar to 5,000 volts of electricity, causing Jimmy's mother to die in a tragic accident. Jimmy gets guitar phobia after witnessing his mother's death. Later, Oberoi's goons break his legs. With help from Rita, Jimmy begins to walk.

Jimmy must claim first place for Team India at the International Disco Dancing Competition amidst strong competition from Team Africa (Disco King and Queen) and Paris (Disco King and Queen). Jimmy is reluctant to dance, but Rita persuades him to do so. Sam arrives with a guitar to scare Jimmy. Rita manages to drag the show to encourage Jimmy to sing but to no avail. The crowd pelts him with stones which hit his head. Jimmy's uncle Raju arrives and advises him to infuse his mother and his music; he throws the guitar to Jimmy, after which Jimmy begins to sing. Oberoi's goons kill Raju, after which Jimmy travels to their lair and beats them up. In the ensuing fight, Oberoi is electrocuted.

== Cast ==
- Mithun Chakraborty as Anil / Jimmy
- Kim as Rita Oberoi
- Rajesh Khanna as Master Raju
- Om Puri as David Brown
- Amarnath Mukherjee as Gulam Nabi
- Om Shivpuri as P. N. Oberoi
- Gita Siddharth as Radha
- Karan Razdan as Sam
- Yusuf Khan as Vasco
- Bob Christo as a Russian goon
- Kalpana Iyer as Nikki Brown
- Chandrashekhar as Mayor Khandelwal
- Master Chhotu as Young Anil
- Baby Pinky as Young Rita

== Production ==
The title song "I am a Disco Dancer" was shot at Natraj Studio in Mumbai over three days, wherein scenes featuring Mithun Chakrobarty's signature moves were filmed. Thereafter, the shooting featured crowds scenes at Filmistan Studio in Mumbai.

== Soundtrack ==
Disco Dancer

Soundtrack album by Bappi Lahiri
- Released: 1982
- Genres: Bollywood; disco; EDM
- Language: Hindustani
- Producer: Bappi Lahiri

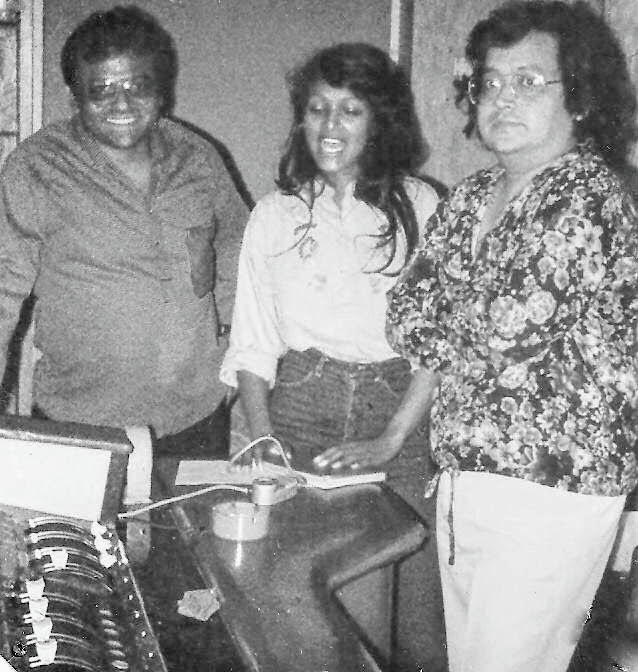
Babbar Subhash, Parvati Khan and Bappi Lahiri recording "Jimmy Jimmy Aaja Aaja" 1981

The music for all the songs were composed by Bappi Lahiri and the lyrics were penned by Anjaan and Faruk Kaiser. The song "Koi Yahaan Nache Nache" was copied from the 1979 song Video Killed the Radio Star. The tracks on the 1982 soundtrack album are as follows:

| No. | Title | Lyrics | Singer(s) | Length |
|---|---|---|---|---|
| 1. | "Ae Oh Aa" | Anjaan | Kishore Kumar | 05:58 |
| 2. | "Jimmy Jimmy Aaja" | Anjaan | Parvati Khan | 03:04 |
| 3. | "I Am A Disco Dancer" | Anjaan | Vijay Benedict | 07:49 |
| 4. | "Koi Yahan Nache Nache" | Faruk Kaiser | Bappi Lahiri, Usha Uthup | 05:28 |
| 5. | "Yaad Aa Raha Hai" | Anjaan | Bappi Lahiri | 06:22 |
| 6. | "Krishna Dharti Pe Aaja" | Anjaan | Nandu Bhende | 05:25 |
| 7. | "Goron Ki Na Kalon Ki" | Anjaan | Suresh Wadkar, Usha Mangeshkar | 05:23 |
| 8. | "Goron Ki Na Kalon (Sad)" | Anjaan | Suresh Wadkar | 02:48 |

"Yaad Aa Raha Hai"
Bappi Lahiri's "Yaad Aa Raha Hai" is a synthesized, minimalist, electronic disco song. It may have influenced the 1982 proto-acid house album Ten Ragas to a Disco Beat.

The song "Yaad Aa Raha Hai" has been described as a synthesized, minimalist, high-tempo, electronic disco song.

The song "Jimmy Jimmy Jimmy Aaja" has similarities to 1980 French disco song "T'es OK" by Ottawan. The song "Auva Auva" (picturized on Karan Razdan's character Sam) was inspired by the 1979 synth-pop hit "Video Killed the Radio Star" by The Buggles. The song "Cerrone's Paradise" by Cerrone was used in the scene when David Brown discovers Anil who is dance-walking down a street. The song "Krishna Dharti Pe Aaja Tu" was inspired by "Jesus" by Tielman Brothers. This version was used in the movie where Jimmy is practicing dance.

The Disco Dancer soundtrack was popular worldwide, particularly in India, the Soviet Union, and China. The soundtrack went Platinum in India, equivalent to 1 million sales, and received a Gold Award in China.

== Box office ==
Worldwide gross (est.)
| Territory | Gross revenue | Inflation-adjusted gross revenue (2016) | Footfalls |
|---|---|---|---|
| Domestic (India) | ₹6.4 crore (US$6.54 million) (Note: 9.79 Indian rupees per US dollar in 1982) | ₹135 crore (US$14 million) | 15 million |
| Overseas (Soviet Union) | 60 million Rbls – US$75.85 million (Note: 0.791 Rbl per US dollar in 1984) (₹94.28 crore) (Note: 12.43 Indian rupees per US dollar in 1984) | US$235 million (₹1,176 crore) | 120 million |
| Worldwide | ₹100.68 crore (US$106 million) | ₹1,261 crore (US$189 million) | 135 million |

In India, the film grossed ₹6.4 crore in 1982. It was the 7th or 14th highest-grossing film at the domestic Indian box office in 1982, with its strongest commercial performance in the West Bengal state, home to actor Mithun Chakraborty and composer Bappi Lahiri.

In the Soviet Union, the film released in 1984, with 1,013 prints. It drew an audience of 60.9 million viewers in 1984, becoming the most successful film at the Soviet box office that year, the biggest foreign hit in the 1980s, the fourth biggest box office hit of the decade, the eighth biggest foreign hit of all time, and one of the top 25 biggest box office hits of all time. Including re-runs, the film sold an estimated 120 million tickets in the Soviet Union. In terms of gross revenue, it earned 60 million Soviet rubles (US$75.85 million, ₹94.28 crore), the highest for an Indian film, surpassing Awaara's 29 million roubles. This made it the highest-grossing Indian film overseas up until it was surpassed by the over ₹100 crore overseas gross of My Name is Khan (2010) and 3 Idiots (2009).

Disco Dancer was also a success in China, when it released there in 1983. The song "Jimmy Jimmy" was popular there. According to Aamir Khan, Mithun Chakraborty is famous in China due to the song.

Worldwide, Disco Dancer grossed a combined ₹100.68 crore (US$82.39 million) in India and the Soviet Union. This surpassed the ₹35 crore gross of Sholay (1975), making Disco Dancer the highest-grossing Indian film worldwide up until it was surpassed by the ₹135 crore gross of Hum Aapke Hain Koun (1994). Disco Dancer was the first Indian film to gross ₹100 crore worldwide.

== Remakes ==
It was remade in Tamil as Paadum Vaanampadi with Anand Babu, and in Telugu as Disco King with Nandamuri Balakrishna. In 2023, there were news reports of Babbar Subhash and Nitin Kumar Gupta producing a remake of a same name and is tentatively being written by V. Vijayendra Prasad.

== Cultural impact and legacy ==
Upon release, Disco Dancer was a phenomenon, both domestically and internationally. Prior to the film's release, Bollywood was dominated by "angry young man" Bombay underworld films, an action crime film genre pioneered by screenwriter duo Salim–Javed a decade earlier in the early 1970s. These films often explored socialist and "hero versus system" themes, often presented a poor hero's journey from rags-to-riches, and involved violent revenge plots against villains. Disco Dancer took the "angry young man" genre and subverted it: instead of having Jimmy fight the villains or get revenge through violence, he instead gets revenge and defeats the villains through disco dancing. This led to a wave of disco-themed Bollywood musicals in India, and it become a global phenomenon outside of India. It was a blockbuster in Asia and the former Soviet Union, and drew a large global cult following, from Japan where a Jimmy statue was built in Osaka, to the West where Disco Dancer became the defining example of a stereotypical "Bollywood" film. Retrospectively, the film has received a polarizing critical reception, with praise for its music and dance numbers but criticism towards its plot, with Anuvab Pal calling it an ironic comedy film.

=== Popular culture ===
The title song "I Am a Disco Dancer" was the inspiration for Devo's song "Disco Dancer" (1988).

The British Sri Lankan alternative rapper M.I.A. covered "Jimmy Jimmy Jimmy Aaja" as "Jimmy" in 2007 for her album Kala. There have been cover versions of "Jimmy Jimmy Aaja Aaja" from other international musicians, including the 1998 hit "Jimmy" by Russian techno group Ruki Vverh, "Jimmy Jimmy" by Russian artists DJ Slon and Angel-A, and a cover version by Tibetan artist Kelsang Metok.

The music from "Jimmy Jimmy Aaja Aaja" was used in the final fight scene in the Adam Sandler film You Don't Mess with the Zohan.

In 2010, the songs "I Am a Disco Dancer" and "Yaad Aa Raha Hai" were used in the 2010 Bollywood comedy film, Golmaal 3, directed by Rohit Shetty. The songs were relevant to the performance of Mithun Chakraborty's character Pritam, who reflected on his past as a young mega-hit disco dancer.

Aamir Khan's special appearance as Disco Fighter in the Imran Khan starrer 2011 film Delhi Belly is inspired by Mithun Chakraborty's role in Disco Dancer.

"Jimmy Jimmy Aaja Aaja" and "I Am a Disco Dancer" are very popular in countries such as Mongolia and post-Soviet states such as Russia, Azerbaijan, and Uzbekistan.

Baimurat Allaberiyev, an ethnic Uzbek from Tajikistan, became an internet sensation by singing "Goron Ki Na Kalon Ki" and "Jimmy Aaja" in a warehouse. The 2008 video recorded on a mobile phone got over 1 million views on YouTube. He landed an acting role in a Russian comedy film, Six Degrees of Celebration (2010).

The film's soundtrack was used during the end credits of the 2019 Tamil film Super Deluxe.

Korean K-pop artist Aoora in collaboration with Saregama released the K-pop version of "Jimmy Jimmy Aaja Aaja".

== See also ==
- 100 Crore Club
- List of highest-grossing Indian films
- List of highest-grossing Indian films in overseas markets
- List of highest-grossing films in the Soviet Union
