= Naseeb (1981 film) =

1981 Indian Hindi-language masala film

- Theatrical release poster
- Directed by: Manmohan Desai
- Written by: Kader Khan; Prayag Raj; K. K. Shukla
- Produced by: Manmohan Desai
- Starring: Amitabh Bachchan; Shatrughan Sinha; Rishi Kapoor; Hema Malini; Reena Roy; Kim; Pran; Prem Chopra; Shakti Kapoor
- Cinematography: Jal Mistry
- Music by: Laxmikant–Pyarelal
- Distributed by: Aasia Films Pvt. Ltd.
- Release date: 1 May 1981
- Running time: 182 mins
- Country: India
- Language: Hindi
- Budget: ₹4 crore (equivalent to ₹82 crore or US$8.5 million in 2023)
- Box office: ₹14.5 crore (equivalent to ₹297 crore or US$31 million in 2023)

Naseeb (transl. Destiny) is a 1981 Indian Hindi-language masala film produced and directed by Manmohan Desai, and written by Kader Khan. It stars Amitabh Bachchan, Shatrughan Sinha, Rishi Kapoor, Hema Malini, Reena Roy, Kim in lead roles and Pran, Prem Chopra, Shakti Kapoor, Kader Khan, Amjad Khan, Amrish Puri and Jeevan. The music is composed by Laxmikant–Pyarelal.

The film was a box office success and was later remade in Tamil as Sandhippu (1983) and in Telugu as Trimurtulu (1987).

== Plot ==
Naseeb, a story of destiny and fate, begins with a lottery ticket. In 1961 A drunken man who cannot pay his tab trades: he decides to sell his ticket to the waiter, Namdeo (Pran). Namdeo purchases this ticket with his three friends Damu (Amjad Khan), Raghu (Kader Khan) and Jaggi (Jagdish Raj). Using a system of drawing out the highest card to decide who keeps the ticket, Jaggi wins, and the ticket stays with him. When the ticket turns out to be a winner, Damu and Raghu turn on the other two, murdering Jaggi and framing Namdeo, However, Damu takes a photo of Raghu killing Jaggi. Namdev goes on the run, but Raghu and Damu intervene and throw him over a bridge into a river. Namdev is presumed dead.

Twenty years later in 1981 Damu and Raghu have used their stolen lottery money to build a fabulous hotel and make millions, becoming very successful businessmen. Damu has used a share of his money to send his youngest son, Vicky (Shatrughan Sinha), to school in England. They have even employed Namdev's oldest son Johnny (Amitabh Bachchan), Vicky's best friend, as a waiter in the hotel. By coincidence (or by fate!) Johnny and Vicky fall in love with the same beautiful singer, Miss Asha (Hema Malini). Julie (Reena Roy) is a childhood friend of Vicky's who is in love with him, but he only sees her as a friend. When Johnny discovers this, he and Julie sacrifice their own love to ensure that Vicky and Asha get together. At the same time, Johnny's younger brother Sunny (Rishi Kapoor) has fallen for Asha's younger sister, Kim (Kim Yashpal). Namdev has revealed to be rescued by a person called Don. He sends Namdev undercover to investigate the death of KK after Damu kills him. Mrs Gomes sees him and in excitement, falls off a bus and becomes unconscious. Raghu's and his sons plan to kill Damu and Vicky for their own financial gains. His younger son Ashok shoots at them but they survive. Namdev knocks out Ashok and Vicky and takes them away. Johnny follows him. Namdeo gets into a fight with Johnny and is about to kill him just as Mrs. Gomes regains consciousness and reveals that Johnny is Namdev's son. Kim and Asha happen to be the daughters of Jaggi, the man Namdev supposedly murdered.

Damu confronts Raghu and reveals the photo he took of him killing Jaggi. Raghu gets into a fight with Damu, ending with Raghu's elder son Prem pushing him off the balcony, killing him. Before dying, he reveals to Sunny that the proof of Namdev's innocence is somewhere near. Sunny finds the photo but Raghu and his son hold him at gunpoint and burn the evidence. Namdev, Johnny and Vicky capture Raghu's younger son Ashok. Namdev and Raghu exchange their sons at the rotating hotel with Sunny revealing another photo of Jaggi's killing. Don however, holds them hostage and takes the photo. He tells Namdev that if he confesses to murdering Jaggi that he will free him later on. He also tells Raghu that his men will shoot Johnny, Vicky and Sunny when they get home. Asha, Julie and Kim overhear this. Don's son Zabisco tries to kill them, motivated by revenge due to Vicky closing down his casino in London. Asha, Julie and Kim break in and take Zabisco down. Johnny, Vicky and Sunny beat him up and force him to tell his father that they are all dead. That night they go to the hotel during a performance, take the photo off Don and hand it over to the police. Namdev, Johnny, Vicky and Sunny fight their enemies. While doing so, the hotel catches fire with Zabisco and Raghu falling to their deaths. Johnny, Vicky and Sunny narrowly escape and Namdev is proved innocent. The film ends with Namdev owning the hotel and allowing the man who sold them his lottery ticket free food from the hotel forever, telling him never to sell his destiny.

== Cast ==
- Amitabh Bachchan as John Jani Janardan 'Johnny' (Naamdev's Elder Son)
- Shatrughan Sinha as Vikram 'Vicky' (Damu's son)
- Rishi Kapoor as Sunny (Naamdev's Younger son)
- Hema Malini as Asha
- Reena Roy as Julie
- Kim as Kim
- Pran as Naamdev
- Amjad Khan as Damodar 'Damu'
- Kader Khan as Raghuvir 'Raghu'
- Meena Rai as Shanti (Johnny mother)
- Uma Khosla as Salma (Sunny mother)
- Shammi as bus passenger
- Prem Chopra as Prem (Raghu's Elder Son)
- Shakti Kapoor as Ashok (Raghu's Younger Son)
- Amrish Puri as Don
- Lalita Pawar as Mrs. Gomes (Julie's Mother)
- Yusuf Khan as Zebisco (Don's Son)
- Jagdish Raj as Jaggi (Asha & Kim's Father)
- Om Shivpuri as K.K.
- Mukri as Mehboob Bhai
- Shubha Khote as Ms. Prema (School Principal)
- Jeevan as Professor Prem (School Principal)
- Viju Khote as Rodricks
- Manik Irani as Fighter
- Asrani as Himself (Shooting Advert with Asha)
- Sunder as Chef
- Bhagwan Dada as Chef
- Keshto Mukherjee as Ad Director
- Satyen Kappu as Lottery Ticket Owner

== Soundtrack ==
All the songs were composed by Laxmikant–Pyarelal and the lyrics were penned by Anand Bakshi.

Song	Singer
"Rang Jamake Jayenge, Chakkar Chalake Jayenge, Jhumke, Ghumke Sabko Ghumake Jayenge"	Kishore Kumar, Mohammed Rafi, Shailendra Singh, Asha Bhosle, Usha Mangeshkar
"Pakdo Pakdo Pakdo, Jakdo Jakdo Jakdo, Dekho Jane Na Paye"	Kishore Kumar, Usha Mangeshkar
"John Jani Janardan"	Mohammed Rafi
"Chal Mere Bhai, Tere Haath Jodta Hoon, Haath Jodta Hoon, Tere Paon Padta Hoon"	Mohammed Rafi, Amitabh Bachchan, Rishi Kapoor
"Mere Naseeb Mein"	Lata Mangeshkar
"Zindagi Imtihan Leti Hai"	Kamlesh Awasthi, Anwar, Suman Kalyanpur

== Cameo appearances ==
One of the songs in the film sung by Mohammed Rafi, "John Jani Janardan", has cameo appearances by many actors playing themselves. The appearances include Raj Kapoor, Shammi Kapoor, Randhir Kapoor, Dharmendra, Rajesh Khanna, Rakesh Roshan, Vijay Arora, Waheeda Rehman, Sharmila Tagore, Mala Sinha, Bindu, Simi Garewal, Simple Kapadia and Prema Narayan. According to an interview, the opening line was composed by Manmohan Desai himself. The tune was inspired by a catchy line from the song "Aksar Koi Ladka" from Bobby.

The star-studded song was shot at R. K. Studios and the shooting spanned one week. Showman Raj Kapoor played an integral part in the song and during the shooting. The one-week shoot was a gala event.

== Box office ==
The film was an "All Time Earner", got the highest verdict (equivalent to All Time Blockbuster today) present at that time by Trade Guide Bollywood box office magazine, and was among those rare movies which crossed 1 crore per territory. There were only 13 All Time Earners (crossing 1 crore per territory) before 1984, and Naseeb was among them.

== Awards and nominations ==
- Filmfare Best Actress Award – Hema Malini – nominated

== See also ==
- Predestination in Islam
- Salat al-Istikharah
