= Parvati Khan =

Indian-Trinidadian singer and model

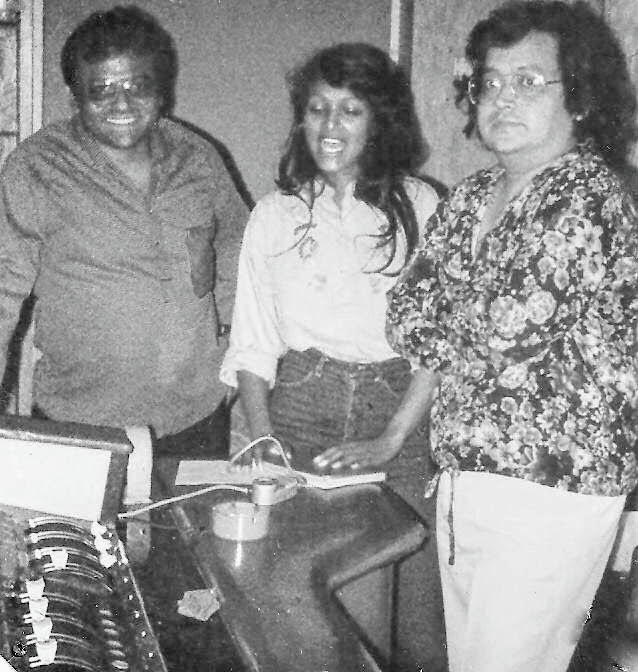
- Khan in a recording session, standing alongside Babbar Subhash and Bappi Lahiri
- Born: Parvati Maharaj; Port of Spain, Trinidad and Tobago
- Citizenship: Trinidad and Tobago
- Occupations: Singer, model
- Years active: 1982–present
- Known for: "Jimmy Jimmy Aaja Aaja" from Disco Dancer
- Spouse: Nadeem Khan (m. 1979)
- Relatives: Rahi Masoom Raza (father-in-law)

Parvati Khan (née Maharaj) is a Trinidadian pop singer and model based in India. She is best known as the singer who sang the song "Jimmy Jimmy Aaja" in the 1982 Bollywood hit movie Disco Dancer, which won a Gold Disc award. She is also known for the song Khula Tala Chod Aayi.

== Early life ==
Parvati Khan (née Maharaj) was born into an Indian family in Trinidad and Tobago. At the age of 12, she had won Mastana Bahar, a TV talent contest in Trinidad and Tobago. Later she studied in England to be a nurse.

== Career ==
Parvati Khan is known for her work in Disco Dancer (1982), Love Love Love(1989), and Maa Kasam (1985). In 2000, she performed her compositions focused on themes of peace and unity at a concert held at the United Nations General Assembly Hall in New York. Since 2002, she has focused on performing devotional songs, known as Bhajans, dedicated to Hindu deities such as Shiva, Shirdi Sai Baba and Ma Amritanandamayi. Her song 'Jimmy Jimmy' is well-known and received recognition, including a reported Golden Peacock Award in China..

Parvati Khan resumed her singing career after being invited by Bappi Lahiri to perform at a program held at Shanmukhanand Hall in Mumbai, Maharashtra, India on 2 June 2017.

== Personal life ==
Parvati is married to the Bollywood director and cinematographer Nadeem Khan, stepson of Dr. Rahi Masoom Raza. She has a son named Jatin with him.

She stirred up significant controversy in India by offering prayers in Kashi Vishwanath temple, she admitted to having performed abhishek at the temple in Varanasi during Mahashivratri despite having been banned earlier from doing so due to opposition from the Shiv Sainiks in 2004. She has engaged in various initiatives, including serving as a spiritual guru at the Tihar Jail, believing that she has been chosen as a peace envoy. With an intention to promote peace, unity, love and oneness, she has visited various prisons in India and held 'satsang'.
