= K. Hariharan =

K. Hariharan may refer to:

- K. Hariharan (director), Indian film director
- Krishna Hariharan (born 1955), Indian Test cricket umpire
