= Phir Wahi Raat =

- Directed by: Danny Denzongpa
- Produced by: N.N.Sippy
- Starring: Rajesh Khanna; Kim; Danny Denzongpa; Aruna Irani; Suresh Oberoi; Shashikala
- Music by: R. D. Burman
- Release date: 15 August 1980
- Country: India
- Language: Hindi

Phir Wahi Raat (transl. That Same night) is a 1980 Indian Hindi-language horror film directed by Danny Denzongpa and starring Rajesh Khanna as a psychologist doctor opposite Kim, then girlfriend of Danny. The film also features Danny Denzongpa, Aruna Irani, Suresh Oberoi and Shashikala in supporting roles. The film music and scores composed by R. D. Burman. This is the first and the only film directed by Danny Denzongpa.

== Plot ==
Asha lives in a hostel and is troubled by the nightmares of her deceased aunt. The hostel warden and her friend Shobha take her to a psychiatrist Dr Vijay. Doctor finds nothing wrong with her and advises her to get away from old memories. Parents of other girls from the hostel complain to the administration about Asha's behaviour and she is told to vacate the place.

Asha decides to go to her ancestral home. Dr Vijay and Shobha accompany her. The huge manor is taken care of by Vishwanath and his daughter Gauri. Dr Vijay and Asha develop a bond and after a few days Dr Vijay goes back to city for some work. Same night Asha sees a scary looking woman walking in the corridors. The woman keeps haunting her every night and Asha's condition worsens. Dr Vijay comes back to help her and meets Asha's cousin Ashok in the manor.

Dr Vijay and Ashok plan a big party on the occasion of Asha's birthday. Ashok calls his wife who lives abroad to join them. Ashok's wife arrives, when Asha is cutting her birthday cake. Asha gets shocked to see her as she is the same woman who is haunting her from last many days in the house. She panics and stabs Ashok's wife, who succumbs to her injuries and dies on the spot. Police inspector Sharma (Suresh Oberoi), who is a guest of the party arrests Asha on the charge of murder. The court suspends the hearing as Asha's condition is not stable and she is not suitable to go through the legal process.

Dr Vijay treats Asha and tries to get her to answer as to why did Asha kill Ashok's wife. He tells Asha that Ashok's wife arrived in India on the same day and there is no possibility that Asha saw her before her birthday in that house. But Asha is adamant that it was Ashok's wife who was haunting her.

Gauri also gets killed after a few days. Shobha starts watching another woman walking around the house. Dr Vijay investigates further with the help of Inspector Sharma and solves the mystery at the end exposing a web of lies and greed.

== Cast ==
- Rajesh Khanna as Dr. Vijay
- Kim as Asha
- Danny Denzongpa as Ashok Verma
- Aruna Irani as Shobha
- Shubha Khote as Shobha's Sister
- Jagdeep as Krupachand Reswani
- A. K. Hangal as Vishwanath
- Tamanna as Gauri
- Lalita Pawar as Hostel Warden
- Shashikala as Aunty
- Suresh Oberoi as Inspector Sharma
- Bhagwan Dada as Gendamal
- Mukri as Drunken Man
- Mohan Choti as Man at Bar
- Birbal as Man at Bar
- Om Shivpuri as Dr. Desai

== Crew ==
- Direction; Danny Denzongpa
- Production; N. N. Sippy
- Camera; Sudarshan Nag, S.N. Dubey
- Music Direction; Rahul Dev Burman
- Lyrics; Majrooh Sultanpuri
- Playback; Asha Bhosle, Kishore Kumar, Lata Mangeshkar, Mohammad Rafi, Sushma Shrestha

== Soundtrack ==
Song	Singer
"Bindiya Tarse"	Lata Mangeshkar
"Sang Mere Nikle"	Kishore Kumar, Lata Mangeshkar
"Chhalkao Jhumke"	Kishore Kumar
"Dekho Idhar Dekho"	Kishore Kumar, Asha Bhosle, Sushma Shrestha
"Phir Wahi Raat"	Asha Bhosle
"Aa Gaye Yaaron"	Mohammed Rafi
