= Bandhu (1992 film) =

1992 Hindi film

- Directed by: Ugyen Chopel
- Written by: Danny Denzongpa (story)
- Screenplay by: Danny Denzongpa; Tulsi Ghimeray; Ugyen Chopel
- Produced by: Romesh Sharma
- Cinematography: Bashher Ali
- Edited by: Mohinder Ashish
- Music by: Ranjit Gazmer
- Production company: Romesh Films Pvt. Ltd.
- Distributed by: A Narendra Hirawat & Co.
- Release date: 2 October 1992
- Running time: 128 minutes
- Country: India
- Language: Hindi

Bandhu (transl. The Friend) is a 1992 Hindi-language action drama film directed by Ugyen Chopel and produced by Romesh Sharma under the banner of Romesh Films Pvt. Ltd. This film was also released in Bengali. Bandhu is the Hindi remake of 1987 Nepali film Saino directed by the same director.

== Plot ==
Dipak leaves Bombay to stay in a hill station with his wife Nita and their only child Binu. A Local evil landlord, Ajit Bihari, tries to capture Dipak's land. After few days, Dipak dies in a road accident. One night Bihari intrudes into Dipak's house and tries to rape a helpless Nita. Suddenly a stranger enters the house and saves her. Nita's son Binu calls him Bandhu (Friend). A friendly relationship forms between them, and the stranger lives with them. A local older woman advises the stranger to marry Nita. But police come to arrest the stranger for killing Dipak.

== Cast ==
- Danny Denzongpa as Bandhu
- Abhishek as Deepak
- Geetanjali as Neeta
- Sunil Thapa as Police Inspector (special appearance)
- Farida Jalal as Old Woman
- Deb Mukherjee as Ajit Bihari
- Archana Puran Singh as Bandhu's wife
- Tapas Paul as a Special Appearance
- Joya Mathur
- Tarun Ghosh

== Music ==
Ranjit Gazmer composed all the songs while Kiran Mishra wrote them.

- "Ek Jyoti Chita Se Jalakar" - Asha Bhosle
- "Chalo Chalen Saathiyan" - Asha Bhosle, Kumar Sanu
- "Kaun Ho Mere Tum" - Danny Denzongpa
- "Mausi Oh Mausi" - Sudesh Bhosle, Jolly Mukherjee, Anupama Deshpande
