= Andar Baahar =

- Theatrical release poster
- Directed by: Raj N. Sippy
- Written by: Kader Khan (dialogues)
- Screenplay by: Sachin Bhowmick
- Based on: 48 Hrs. by: Roger Spottiswoode; Walter Hill; Larry Gross; Steven E. de Souza
- Produced by: Romu N. Sippy
- Starring: Anil Kapoor; Jackie Shroff; Moon Moon Sen; Kim; Danny Denzongpa
- Cinematography: Ashok Mehta
- Edited by: Waman Bhosle; Gurudutt Shirali
- Music by: R. D. Burman
- Production company: Uttam Chitra
- Release date: 7 September 1984
- Country: India
- Language: Hindi

Andar Bahaar (English: Inside and Outside) is a 1984 Indian Hindi-language action comedy film. Produced by Romu Sippy and directed by Raj N. Sippy, the film is a remake of the 1982 American film 48 Hrs. It stars Anil Kapoor, Jackie Shroff, Moon Moon Sen, Kim, Danny Denzongpa in the key roles. The film's music is by R. D. Burman.

== Story ==
The notorious criminal Shamsher Singh, shortly called Shera enlists the help of small time crook and expert safe-cracker Raja to help him rob a bank. The robbery goes without a hitch, but Shera, wanting all the loot for himself, shoots Raja. Their third partner Gulshan flees with the loot, abandoning Shera. The sound of a gunshot brings Inspector Ajay Sahni to the scene. He arrests Shera and Raja, who are only wounded by the bullet.

With help from his loyal crony Gangu, Shera escapes from prison. He then kidnaps Gulshan's sister and keeps her with him until Gulshan can give him all the money from the loot. Gulshan panics and informs the police about Shera's hideout. Inspector Ajay Sahni and his friend Inspector Ravi Khanna both reach the scene but fail to apprehend Shera, who flees after fatally shooting Inspector Ajay.

Filled with rage and vengeance, Ravi gets permission from the Police Commissioner to release Raja into his custody so that he may help him track down Shera. Initially, Ravi and Raja knock heads and often get into arguments. But after Raja saves Ravi's life, they become good friends. After a lot of investigative work and dangerous encounters, the two eventually manage to arrest Shera.

== Cast ==
- Anil Kapoor as Raja
- Jackie Shroff as Inspector Ravi Khanna
- Moon Moon Sen as Reema
- Kim as Monica
- Danny Denzongpa as Shamsher Singh "Shera"
- Gulshan Grover as Gulshan
- Huma Khan as Gulshan's Sister
- Parikshit Sahni as Inspector Ajay Sahni
- Beena Banerjee as Beena Sahni
- Jayshree T. as Reshma
- Viju Khote as Bartender
- Sulochana Latkar as Ravi's Mother
- Murad as Judge
- M. Rajan as Jailor
- Gurbachan Singh as Gangu

== Music ==
=== Soundtrack ===
The music for the film was composed by R. D. Burman, with lyrics by Gulshan Bawra. The playback singers used were Shailendra Singh (for Jackie Shroff) and Suresh Wadkar (for Anil Kapoor), along with Asha Bhosle for all actresses.

Song	Singer
"Andar Bahar, Bahar Andar"	Suresh Wadkar
"Humko To Yaari Se Matlab Hai" (Happy)	Suresh Wadkar, Shailendra Singh
"Humko To Yaari Se" (Sad)	Shailendra Singh
"Mausam Bada Suhana Hai, Iska Ek Afsana Hai"	Shailendra Singh, Asha Bhosle
"Meri Aankhon Mein"	Asha Bhosle
"Kaise Kaise Hain"	Asha Bhosle
