= Jeeo Aur Jeene Do =

- Theatrical release poster
- Directed by: Shyam Ralhan
- Written by: Kader Khan (dialogues); Sahir Ludhianvi (lyrics); Varma Malik (lyrics)
- Screenplay by: Prayag Raj
- Story by: B. K. Rao
- Produced by: Ratan Mohan
- Starring: Jeetendra; Reena Roy; Nutan; Danny Denzongpa; Pran
- Cinematography: Sudershan Naag
- Edited by: Bhaskar Rao
- Music by: Laxmikant-Pyarelal
- Production company: R. M. Art Productions
- Release date: 8 October 1982
- Running time: 153 minutes
- Country: India
- Language: Hindi

Jeeo Aur Jeene Do (transl. Live and Let Live) is a 1982 Hindi-language action film, produced by Ratan Mohan under the R.M. Art Productions banner and directed by Shyam Ralhan. It stars Jeetendra, Reena Roy, Nutan, Danny Denzongpa and Pran and music composed by Laxmikant-Pyarelal.

== Plot ==
"Jeeo Aur Jeene Do" implies "live and let live" the famous English phrase, and whenever any human being tries to snatch the fundamental right of the entire humanity on earth, irrespective of time and place, take it for granted that this is beginning of a revolution, whether the happenings are new, or whether this is Mahabharat or Ramayan. Much like Sita of The Ramayan, the Sita in this story is a woman, who for the sake of her "Suhag" (principles) sacrifices not only her child, but her husband too. Sita is a husband-devoted woman whose husband Jwala Singh is a brave and gallant police inspector. They have a child around one year of age. Sita is a doctor. Jwala Singh is transferred in the area of dreaded and dangerous dacoits, the leader being Maherban Singh. This Chief dacoit, in fact, rules the heart of poor men. Jwala Singh has been directed to arrest Meherban Singh alive or dead. Sita too finds herself a job in the hospital here. Meherban Singh's wife is about to give birth and is in a serious condition. On coming to know that Sita is the only lady doctor available in this area, Meherban Singh at the risk of his own life, manages to kidnap Sita and brings her to his den, not knowing that she is the wife of police Inspector Jwala Singh, his natural enemy. Sita agrees to perform the operation on his wife only on the condition that he surrenders to her husband. After a great deal of mental conflict, Meherban Singh accepts her as his sister and agrees to her wish, the child is born, Meherban Singh's wife dies, he surrenders the child's responsibility and he is accepted by Sita. This creates a misunderstanding between her husband and mother-in-law and ultimately she is discarded by both of them.

Twenty-five years elapse. The son of the outlaw Meherban Singh becomes the preserver of law, he is Inspector Vijay. At a young age, this brave Inspector is an example in himself as an ideal police officer and a devoted son to Sita. Within this period, Jwala Singh has become the Commissioner of Police and is posted to Mumbai. Incidentally, Inspector Vijay becomes Jwala Singh's subordinate. The identity of his father always remains secret for Vijay as Sita never told him that he happens to be the son of a dacoit. This feeling always tortured Vijay. Incidentally, Vijay discovers a picture of Commissioner Jwala Singh in the Ramayana book of his mother. This creates complications between son and mother. Vijay wants to know everything that had happened in the past. On the other hand, the dacoit, Meherban Singh is released from the prison after the completion of his sentence.

== Cast ==
- Jeetendra as Inspector Vijay J Singh
- Reena Roy as Renu
- Nutan as Dr. Seeta J Singh
- Danny Dengzongpa as Inspector / Police Commissioner Jwala Singh
- Pran as Meharban Singh
- Kader Khan as Sher Singh
- Om Shivpuri as Ajit Singh
- Satyendra Kapoor as Bade Thakur
- Jagdeep as Constable Eagle
- Vijayendra Ghatge as Dr. Rajesh Singh
- Kajal Kiran as Radha
- Lalita Pawar as Jwala's Mother
- Jagdish Raj as Police Inspector
- Raza Murad as Vikram A Singh
- Tej Sapru as Madhav Singh
- Narendranath as Thakur Narendra Singh
- Sharat Saxena as Kallu
- Mehmood Jr. as Kallu's Sidekick
- Raj Kiran as Himself

== Soundtrack ==
Lyrics: Verma Malik

Song	Singer
"Seeta Ke Liye"	Mohammed Rafi
"Hathapai Na Karo"	Asha Bhosle
"Bulbula Pani Ka"	Asha Bhosle
"Kurta Malmal Ka"	Asha Bhosle, Suresh Wadkar
"Alibaba Alibaba"	Kavita Krishnamurthy, Suresh Wadkar
"Chudi Ki Chhun Chhun"	Anuradha Paudwal
