= Yusuf Khan (actor) =

Egyptian actor

Yusuff Abousher (1 May 1940 – 1985) was an Egyptian actor based in India who worked in Hindi-language films. He was known as Bollywood's most handsome villain. Although Khan acted in 35 films and remained popular as a rather sympathetic villain through the 1970s and 1980s with films like Muqaddar Ka Sikandar (1978) and Disco Dancer (1982), he is best remembered for his role as Zebisko, Parveen Babi's bodyguard in Manmohan Desai's film Amar Akbar Anthony (1977).

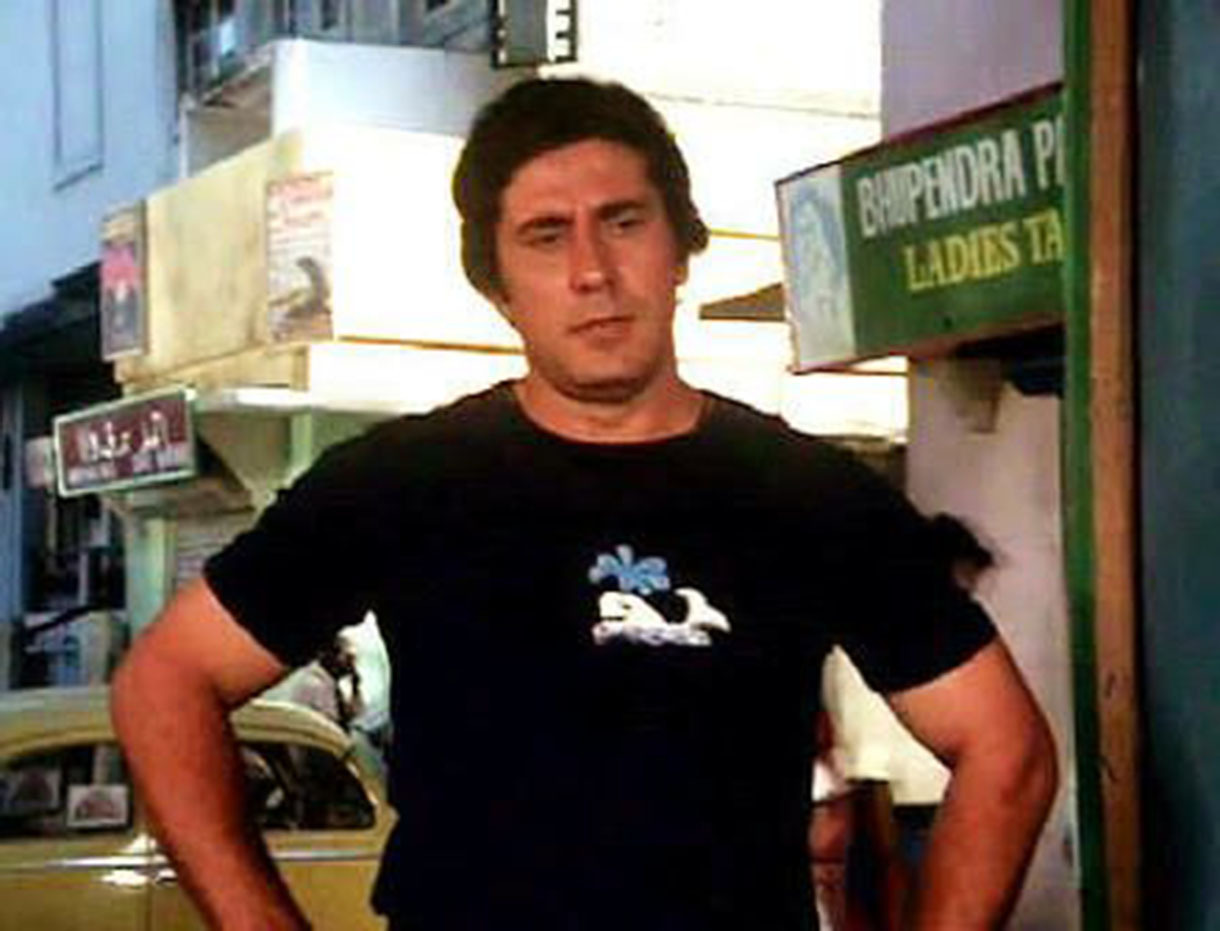

Yusuf Khan was born in Egypt as Yousuff Abousher. He was of Egyptian and Syrian descent Khans parents moved the family to Hyderabad, India where he spend his early childhood. His family later moved to Bangalore where he attended Baldwin Boys' High School. In the late 1960s he moved to Bombay to become a Bollywood actor.

He is the father of Bollywood and television actor Faraaz Khan. He died in Hyderabad in 1985 from a brain hemorrhage.

== Filmography ==
Year	Title	Role	Notes
1969	Jungle Ki Haseena	Hero	Debut film
1970	Kaalam Vellum	Fighter	
1971	Haatim Tai		
1972	Bombay to Goa	Boxer Pedro	
1972	Garam Masala	Motu	
1973	Naina	Tony	
1974	Do Phool	Smuggler's Chief	
1974	Duniya Ka Mela	John	
1975	Dharmatma	Bandit	
1976	Harfan Maulaa		
1977	Chhailla Babu	Man who tries to trick Pratap	
1977	Amar Akbar Anthony	Zebisko	Jenny's bodyguard
1977	Hum Kisise Kum Naheen	Henchman	
1977	Parvarish	Mangal's Henchman	
1977	Chandi Sona	George	
1978	Vishwanath	Henchman	
1978	Don	Vikram	
1978	Des Pardes	Goon	
1978	Phandebaaz	Boxer	
1978	Muqaddar Ka Sikandar	Seth Paul	
1980	Dhan Daulat	Goon	
1980	Aap Ke Deewane	Yusuf	
1980	Karz	Roxi	
1980	Ram Robert Rahim		Telugu film
1981	Naseeb	Zebisco	Don's Son
1981	Hotel	Abdul	
1981	Zamaane Ko Dikhana Hai	Maulha	
1981	Professor Pyarelal	Sammy's Associate	
1981	Kondaveeti Simham		Telugu film
1982	Dial 100	Goon	
1982	Ashanti	Johnny	
1982	Khud-Daar	Killer / Molester	
1982	Desh Premee	Thakur Pratap Singh's aide	
1982	Disco Dancer	Vasco	
1982	Main Intequam Loonga	Boxer Gopinath	
1983	Mangal Pandey	Peter	
1983	Nastik	Franco	
1984	Boxer	Goon	
1984	Ghar Ek Mandir	Shera's Henchman	
1984	Danavudu	Rudraiah	Telugu film
1984	Kasam Paida Karne Wale Ki	Udaybhan Singh's Henchman	
1985	Bond 303	Henchman	
1985	Bhavani Junction	Gautam	
1986	Inteqam Ki Aag	Henchman	
1991	Bhediyon Ka Samooh: A Pack of Wolves		Delayed release
