= Ajnabi =

1994 Indian TV drama series

- Genre: Drama
- Written by: Danny Denzongpa
- Screenplay by: Danny Denzongpa
- Directed by: Mohinder Batra
- Starring: Danny Denzongpa, Annu Kapoor, Tinnu Anand, Goga Kapoor, Jeet Upendra, Sooraj Thapar, Deepshikha
- Country of origin: India
- Original language: Hindi
- No. of seasons: 1
- No. of episodes: 75

Production
- Producer: Romesh Sharma

Original release
- Network: DD Metro
- Release: 1994 – 1996

Ajnabi is an Indian drama series broadcast on DD Metro channel. The serial's story and screenplay was written by acclaimed actor Danny Denzongpa. It was directed by Mohinder Batra and produced by Romesh Sharma.

The series was loosely based on the Nepali film Saino, written by Denzongpa and directed by his nephew Ugyen. The series comprised 75 episodes.

Denzongpa played an army official who retires and moves to Jammu and Kashmir. The series showed insurgency and terrorism in the state, the bravery of the armed forces and the emotional lives of everyone affected by the insurgency.

== Cast ==
- Danny Denzongpa as Captain
- Parikshit Sahni
- Annu Kapoor
- Deep Dhillon as Passa
- Tinnu Anand
- Goga Kapoor
- Mahendra Sandhu
- Deepshikha Nagpal
- Jeet Upendra
- Amita Nangia
- Sooraj Thapar
- Gajendra Chauhan
- Ibteesam
- Arun Bakshi
