= Aashiq Hoon Baharon Ka =

- Directed by: J. Om Prakash
- Produced by: Raj Bhatija; K.K. Talwar
- Starring: Rajesh Khanna; Zeenat Aman
- Music by: Laxmikant–Pyarelal
- Release date: 16 December 1977
- Country: India
- Language: Hindi

Aashiq Hoon Baharon Ka (transl. I am a lover of Spring) is a 1977 Indian Hindi-language action romance film drama, directed by J. Om Prakash starring Rajesh Khanna and Zeenat Aman..

== Plot ==
Ashok, the protagonist, successfully completes his academic journey by earning a Master of Science (M.Sc.) degree. His mother aspires for him to continue his education in Switzerland. Despite Ashok's initial reluctance due to financial concerns, his mother persuades him to pursue this opportunity. In Switzerland, Ashok resides in accommodations arranged by a friend of his principal, who owns a hotel. This hotel owner is also the stepfather of Vikram, a troubled young man who develops a hostile attitude towards Ashok.

While en route to a car race, Ashok encounters Veera, an arrogant young woman attempting to steal his vehicle. Despite this altercation, Ashok successfully wins the race and sends the prize money to his mother. Subsequently, Veera's father proposes a business collaboration with Ashok in the field of atomic science, as Ashok needs uranium for his research. However, Vikram, who wishes to marry Veera and inherit her wealth, schemes against Ashok. With the assistance of Ashok's own research assistant, Vikram frames Ashok for the theft of uranium.

As a result of the accusations, Veera's father has Ashok imprisoned, with Veera initially trusting her father's judgment. However, Ashok manages to prove his innocence by obtaining a confession from Vikram, revealing the true perpetrator. Veera apologizes to Ashok for her previous actions, and her father consents to their relationship on the condition that Ashok remains in Switzerland permanently. Ashok declines this condition, and Veera supports his decision.

Subsequently, Vikram kidnaps Veera and demands a ransom from her father. In desperation, Veera's father turns to Ashok for assistance. Ashok confronts Vikram, successfully rescues Veera, and the two are finally united.

== Cast ==
- Rajesh Khanna as Ashok Sharma
- Zeenat Aman as Veera Rai
- Danny Denzongpa as Vikram (Jamunada's son)
- Preeti Ganguli as Mary John
- Julie as Olga
- Pinchoo Kapoor as Mr. John
- Sulochana Latkar as Ashok's mother
- Nadira as Heera (Jamunda's wife)
- Om Prakash as Mr. Jamunadas
- Rehman as Mr. Chandidas Rai
- Asrani as Murlidhar

== Soundtrack ==
| # | Title | Singer(s) |
|---|---|---|
| 1 | "Tera Dil Kya Kehta Hai" | Kishore Kumar |
| 2 | "Aashiq Hoon Baharon Ka" | Kishore Kumar |
| 3 | "I Am in Love" | Kishore Kumar, Lata Mangeshkar, Annette Pinto |
| 4 | "Mere Gore Galon Ka" | Lata Mangeshkar |
| 5 | "Mashriq Se Jo Aaye" | Kishore Kumar |
