= Danny Denzongpa =

Indian actor, playback singer and film director

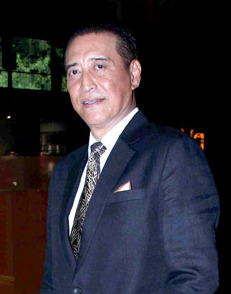
- Danny Denzongpa in 2015
- Born: Tsering Phuntsok Denzongpa; 25 February 1948 (age 78); Yuksom, Kingdom of Sikkim (present-day Sikkim, India)
- Education: St Joseph's College, Darjeeling; Film and Television Institute of India
- Occupations: Actor; playback singer; film director
- Years active: 1971–present
- Works: Filmography
- Spouse: Gawa Denzongpa (m. 1990)
- Awards: Padma Shri (2003)

Danny Denzongpa (born Tsering Phuntsok Denzongpa; 25 February 1948) is an Indian actor, playback singer, film director, and liquor baron. His film career was primarily in Hindi, but also occasionally in Bengali, Nepali, and Tamil films. In a career spanning five decades, has acted in over 190 films since 1971. In 2003, Denzongpa was awarded the Padma Shri, India's fourth-highest civilian honour.

He has also starred in some international films, the most famous being Seven Years in Tibet where he appeared alongside Brad Pitt. His best known villainous roles are in Dhund, 36 Ghante, Bandish, Jeeo Aur Jeene Do, Pyar Jhukta Nahin, Aandhi-Toofan, Agneepath, Hum, Krantiveer, Ghatak, Indian and Enthiran whereas his best known positive roles were in Chor Machaye Shor, Fakira, Kalicharan, Devata, Bulundi, Adhikar, Aag Hi Aag and China Gate. His directorial venture Phir Wahi Raat was considered among the top five best horror suspense films of Hindi Cinema.

== Personal life and education ==
Born as Tshering Phintso Denzongpa on 25 February 1948 to a Bhutia family in Yuksom, Kingdom of Sikkim, he did his schooling in Birla Vidya Mandir, Nainital and thereafter completed college coursework at St Joseph's College, Darjeeling, in 1964. Denzongpa's love of horses and horse-riding began at an early age, as his family was into horse breeding. He is also a painter, a writer and a sculptor.

He had an ambition to join the Indian Army and won the Best Cadet award from West Bengal and participated in the Republic Day parade. In an interview to The Times of India newspaper, he claimed that he had qualified for the Armed Forces Medical College, Pune, but withdrew admission to join the Film and Television Institute of India (FTII), Pune. He decided to change his name to a simpler sounding "Danny", on recommendation from his then-classmate Jaya Bachchan, as his original name of Tshering Phintso Denzongpa was considered difficult for some to pronounce. His son Rinzing Denzongpa made his acting debut in the action film Squad.

== Career ==
=== Acting ===
He started out with B.R. Ishara's Zaroorat in 1971(released in 1972), which was his debut film. He got his major break in Gulzar's Mere Apne (1971), where he had a positive role. He first played an antagonist in B.R.Chopra's Dhundh (1973), where he played the role of a cripple and frustrated husband.

He played the second lead hero and had more positive roles in commercially successful critically acclaimed films in the seventies, such as Chor Machaye Shor, 36 Ghante, Fakira, Kalicharan, Kaala Sona and Devata. After his performance in the film Devata, he started getting more significant lengthy roles. He was simultaneously part of big budget films such as Aashiq Hoon Baharon Ka, Paapi, Bandish, The Burning Train and Chunoti in negative roles.

In the early 1980s period, he had thought of quitting films. He said in an interview, when asked why he decided to direct a film, "I remember in 80s I was so fed up of the films I was doing. Those days every villain was a dacoit and I remember going on the sets where an actor called Tiwari was my henchmen and my den was a cave with lanterns. Next day I went on another set and I saw Tiwari again as my henchman, and the same lanterns. I asked myself what was I doing? I left Mumbai. I did lot of trekking and did not do films for a couple of years. I told NN Sippy about a script that I had in mind. and he asked me to direct. I made Phir Wohi Raat with Rajesh Khanna and my then girlfriend Kim." After the success of his directorial debut, he received offers to act as the hero again in the films such as Bulundi and Hum Se Badkar Kaun in 1981, which became successful. He played a double role in the film Bulundi. However, most subsequent films between 1981 and 1983 were not successful. He was disappointed with the failure of his recently released film Abhi Toh Jee Ley, which had popular songs such as "Tu Laali Hai Saveriwali". Hence, Danny started accepting supporting roles, often playing a character quite older than his real age. He played Kumar Gaurav's father-in-law in Love Story (1981) and Mithun Chakraborty's father in Boxer (1984).

He started getting more frequent offers to play the negative character in Hindi films, after the success of the films Phir Wahi Raat, Jeeo Aur Jeene Do and Dharm Aur Qanoon. He then went on to play the role of villain many times since 1984. From 1984 and through the 1990s, Danny mainly was featured as the lead negative character opposite all the leading actors of that time such as Rajesh Khanna, Dharmendra, Jeetendra, Mithun Chakraborty, Vinod Khanna, Anil Kapoor and Sunny Deol. He stated in an interview; "Had it not been that I had not done the four special negative roles – with Rajesh Khanna, in the lead – Phir Wahi Raat, Dharm Aur Qanoon, Bandish and Aashiq Hoon Baharon Ka, people would not have considered me for villainous roles. In Adhikar I had positive role. He holds special place in my heart as he recognized and stood by me in my tough times which was early eighties."

His most applauded negative characters are in Bandish (1980) as Kapil Kumar, Phir Wahi Raat as "Ashok", Dharm Aur Qanoon (1984), as SP "Kader", Kanoon Kya Karega (1984), as "Raghuvir Singh", Andar Baahar (1984), as "Shera", Oonche Log (1985), as "Thakur Maan Singh", Aandhi Toofan (1986), as "Balbir" Bhagwaan Dada (1986), as "Gangwaa", Agneepath (1990), as "Kancha Cheena", Hum (1991), as "Bakhtawar", Ghatak, as "Kaatya", Krantiveer (1994), as "Chatur Singh", Pukar, (2000) as "Abhrush" and Indian, as "Shankar Singhania". He was pitted against Pran in the film Sanam Bewafa, Paap Ki Duniya, Gurudev and 1942: A Love Story. His command over the Urdu language came in handy in films such as Sawan Kumar's Sanam Bewafa and Mukul Anand's Khuda Gawah.

At one time, when he was increasingly doing negative lead roles, Rajkumar Santoshi cast him as the positive role in China Gate. In the early 2000s, Denzongpa appeared in films such as Asoka and 16 December. Some of the antihero roles he played included an unscrupulous politician, corrupt policeman, traitor, and stingy landlord. He has also starred in some international films, the most famous being Seven Years in Tibet, where he appeared.

In early 2003 Denzongpa decided to take a break from films as he wanted to do different but strong roles, even if it was a negative character. He appeared in only 10 films between 2003 and 2009.

He then made a strong comeback as the villain with his role in Enthiran. He made his debut in Tamil films with Enthiran, co-starring Rajinikanth and Aishwarya Rai in the leads. Denzongpa played the antagonist role of Bohra, a prominent scientist who transforms "Chitti", (played by Rajinikanth) into an evil robot. He then started playing villains in big budget movies such as Jai Ho (2014), co-starring Salman Khan and Bang Bang (2014), co-starring Hrithik Roshan.

He has recently played the role of a coordinator, "Feroz Khan" in the 2015 hit Baby co-starring Akshay Kumar. He reprised his role of "Feroz Khan" in the film's spin-off prequel Naam Shabana.

=== Singing ===
He is an accomplished singer, having sung with Kishore Kumar, Lata Mangeshkar, Mohammed Rafi and Asha Bhosle, the stalwarts of Indian music.

He was first given a chance to sing by S. D. Burman in the film Yeh Gulistan Hamara in 1972. Denzongpa sang a duet with Lata Mangeshkar.

Danny Denzongpa has quoted on S.D. Burman, "My dream to be a playback singer in films came with the number, 'Mera Naam Aao' in 'Yeh Gulistan Hamara' (1972). The maestro that he was, S.D. Burman recognised my singing abilities and conducted the daring experiment of making me sing my first duet with Lata Mangeshkar. He advised me to produce a comic effect yet maintain melody whilst singing. The song was a raging hit." This was told to Ranjan Das Gupta in 'The Hindu' on 8 January 2012.

He has released Nepalese songs, and has sung for Nepalese movies. His two most famous songs recorded in the 1970s but still popular are "Chiso Chiso Hawama" ("In the cool air") and "Manko kura lai bandhi narakha... ("Do not keep the words of the heart tied").

He sang the duet "Suno Suno Kasam Se" in Kaala Sona with Asha Bhosle and sang "Mujhe Doston Tum Gale Lagaa Lo" with Mohammed Rafi, Asha Bhosle and the duet song "Botal Khaali Hone To Do" with Kishore Kumar in the 1978 film Naya Daur – all of which were composed by R.D. Burman.

"Hiun vanda chiso, Aago vanda taato..." ("Colder than snow, hotter than fire..."), "Naachana hoi maichyan hau nachana", ("Dance o lovely girl"), "Jhimkai deu pareli manma bajchha mitho murali...", ("Please blink your eyes and sweet sound of flute plays in the heart), "Raatko rani phulay jhain sanjhama", "Pani Hai Paryo Jhyaure" etc. are some of his few hit numbers. He gained popularity as a singer in the period 1975–1990 especially in Nepal and parts of India like Darjeeling, Sikkim and Assam.

He has sung a Nepali duet with Asha Bhosle, "Aage aage topai ko gola pachhi pachhi machinegun barara" in 1976. This song was shown by Danny to Rajesh Khanna who liked the song tremendously. Then Rajesh Khanna requested R.D. Burman to compose the song – "Sang Mere Nikle The Sajan" from the 1981 film Phir Wohi Raat, which was directed by Danny himself – after getting inspired by the melody of the Nepali folk song sung by Danny – "Aage Aage Topaiko Gola". R. D. Burman changed the interludes and tunes of stanzas but retained the tune at the beginning.

Denzongpa wrote and acted in the Nepali film Saino. His nephew Ugyen Chhopel directed it. He has sung its title song and a duet with Deepa Narayan, wife of Udit Narayan. Later, this film was made in Hindi as Bandhu (1992) by Chopel himself and loosely adapted as the Indian television series Ajnabi for Doordarshan by Denzongpa.

Business

Danny Denzongpa launched Yuksom Breweries in Sikkim in 1987. The company quickly advanced to become the number one brewery in Northeast India.

== Awards and nominations ==
Civilian award

- 2003 – Padma Shri – India's fourth highest civilian honour from the Government of India.

Film awards

Year	Award	Category	Film	Result
1979	Filmfare Awards	Best Supporting Actor	Devata	Nominated
1985	Filmfare Awards	Best Supporting Actor	Kanoon Kya Karega	Nominated
1992	Filmfare Awards	Best Supporting Actor	Sanam Bewafa	Won
1992	Filmfare Awards	Best Performance in a Negative Role	Hum	Nominated
1993	Filmfare Awards	Best Supporting Actor	Khuda Gawah	Won
1995	Filmfare Awards	Best Performance in a Negative Role	Krantiveer	Nominated
1995	Filmfare Awards	Best Performance in a Negative Role	Vijaypath	Nominated
1996	Filmfare Awards	Best Performance in a Negative Role	Barsaat	Nominated
1997	Filmfare Awards	Best Performance in a Negative Role	Ghatak: Lethal	Nominated
