= Dilip Kumar filmography =

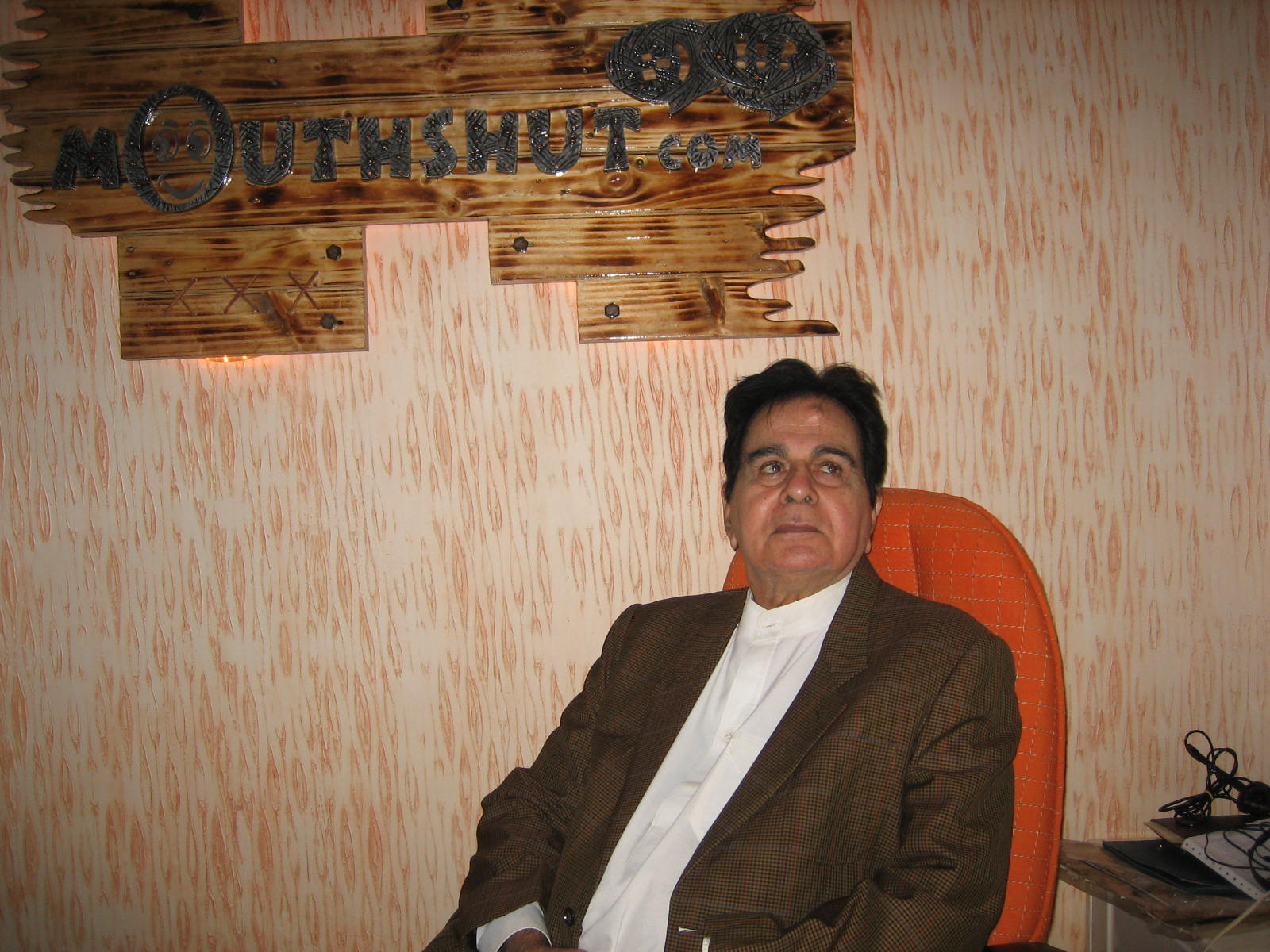
Dilip Kumar in 2006

Dilip Kumar (born Muhammad Yusuf Khan; 11 December 1922 – 7 July 2021) was an Indian actor, screenwriter, and film producer. He made his acting debut in 1944 with Jwar Bhata. The 1947 drama Jugnu opposite Noor Jehan was his first major success. Nadiya Ke Par was similarly that year's highest grossing Indian film. In 1949, he featured alongside Raj Kapoor in Mehboob Khan's Andaz opposite Nargis. This love triangle at the time of its release was the highest-grossing Indian film ever.

The 1950s saw Kumar in a number of popular films playing a variety of roles. Kumar won the first-ever Filmfare Award in the Best Actor category for his performance in 1954 release Daag. Two years later, Kumar played the title character in the drama Azaad, which earned him his second Filmfare Best Actor Award. His title role in Devdas (1955) earned him his third Filmfare Best Actor Award. Some of these films established his screen image as the "Tragedy King" because of his ill-fated characters in films. He also appeared alongside Dev Anand in Insaniyat (1955). Nine of Kumar's films were among the Top 30 highest-grossing films of the decade.

In 1960, Kumar appeared in K. Asif's big-budget epic historical film Mughal-e-Azam. He played Mughal Prince Salim, who falls in love with Anarkali (a court dancer, played by Madhubala), and later revolts against his father Akbar (Prithviraj Kapoor). The film was successful at the box office earning a net revenue of ₹55 million (US$11,530,000). The film became the highest-grossing Indian film of all time. He played dual roles in the drama film Ram Aur Shyam (1967) which earned him his seventh Filmfare Award for Best Actor.

In 1981, Dilip Kumar appeared in historical drama Kranti, in the role of a revolutionary fighting for India's independence from British rule. He collaborated with director Subhash Ghai in films Vidhaata (1982), action film Karma, and Saudagar. He made his last film appearance in Qila. His two films Aag Ka Dariya and Kalinga are completed but remain unreleased.

In total, Kumar worked as a lead in 57 films. Also he was doing many cameo/guest appearances and many unreleased films in his 54 years film career. He also worked off-screen as a background narrator, ghost director and ghost editor as well, without taking credits for them. He was the most choosy and selective actor at that time. He earned 19 nominations for best actor at the Filmfare Awards in his career, winning 8, three of them back to back (which is a record in itself). He received the Filmfare Lifetime Achievement Award in 1994.

== Films ==
List of performances in feature films
Year	Title	Role	Notes	Ref.
1940s
1944	Jwar Bhata	Jagadish	Debut film; Credited as Dileep Kumar	
1945	Pratima	Rajan	Credited as Dileep Kumar	
1946	Milan	Ramesh	Credited as Dileep Kumar	
1947	Jugnu	Suraj	First credit as Dilip Kumar	
1948	Ghar Ki Izzat	Chandra		
1948	Shaheed	Ram		
1948	Mela	Mohan		
1948	Anokha Pyar	Ashok		
1948	Nadiya Ke Par	Kunwar Singh	Credited as Dileep Kumar	
1949	Andaz	Dilip		
1949	Shabnam	Manoj		
1950s
1950	Jogan	Vijay		
1950	Arzoo	Baadal		
1950	Babul	Ashok		
1951	Hulchul	Kishore		
1951	Deedar	Shyamu		
1951	Tarana	Dr. Motilal		
1952	Daag	Shankar	Filmfare Award for Best Actor	
1952	Aan	Jai Tilak Hada		
1952	Sangdil	Shankar		
1953	Shikast	Dr. Ram Singh		
1953	Footpath	Noshu		
1954	Amar	Amarnath		
1954	Angarey	Narrator	Uncredited	
1955	Devdas	Devdas Mukherjee	Filmfare Award for Best Actor	
1955	Uran Khatola	Kashi		
1955	Azaad	Kumar alias Azaad alias Abdul Rahim Khan	Filmfare Award for Best Actor	
1955	Insaniyat	Mangal		
1957	Musafir	Raja		
1957	Naya Daur	Shankar	Filmfare Award for Best Actor	
1958	Yahudi	Marcus		
1958	Madhumati	Anand (previous birth) and Devendra (present birth)	Nominated—Filmfare Award for Best Actor	
1959	Paigham	Rattan Lal	Nominated—Filmfare Award for Best Actor	
1960s
1960	Kohinoor	Yuvraj Rana Dhivendra Pratap Bahadur "Kohinoor"	Filmfare Award for Best Actor	
1960	Mughal-E-Azam	Salim	Nominated — Filmfare Award for Best Actor	
1960	Kala Bazar	Himself	Cameo appearance as one of the stars in the premiere scene of Mother India (1957)	
1961	Dharmputra	Narrator	Uncredited;	
1961	Gunga Jumna	Gungaram	Nominated—Filmfare Award for Best Actor	
1964	Leader	Vijay Khanna	Filmfare Award for Best Actor	
1966	Dil Diya Dard Liya	Shankar alias Raja Sahib	Nominated—Filmfare Award for Best Actor	
1966	Paari	Jailor	Guest appearance; Bengali film	
1967	Ram Aur Shyam	Ram and Shyam (Double Role)	Filmfare Award for Best Actor	
1968	Aadmi	Rajesh alias Raja Sahib	Nominated—Filmfare Award for Best Actor	
1968	Sunghursh	Kundan Prasad alias Bajrangi	Nominated—Filmfare Award for Best Actor	
1970s
1970	Gopi	Gopiram "Gopi"	Nominated—Filmfare Award for Best Actor	
1970	Sagina Mahato	Sagina Mahato	Bengali film	
1972	Dastaan	Diwan Anil Kumar / Sunil Kumar alias Judge Vishnu Sahay		
1972	Koshish	Himself	Guest appearance	
1972	Anokha Milan	Jailor	Guest appearance; Hindi dubbed version of the Bengali film Paari (1966)	
1974	Naya Din Nai Raat	Background narrator	Uncredited; didn't act in this film	
1974	Sagina	Sagina Mahato	Nominated—Filmfare Award for Best Actor	
1974	Phir Kab Milogi	Teja Singh	Guest appearance	
1976	Bairaag	Kailash, Bholanath "Bhola" and Sanjay (Triple Role)	Nominated—Filmfare Award for Best Actor	
1980s
1981	Kranti	Sanga		
1982	Shakti	DCP Ashwini Kumar	Filmfare Award for Best Actor	
1982	Vidhaata	Shamsher Singh / Shobhraj		
1983	Mazdoor	Dinanath Saxena		
1983	Film Hi Film	Ram	Footage of his shelved film Shikwa (1954) were used in the film	
1984	Mashaal	Vinod Kumar	Nominated — Filmfare Award for Best Actor	
1984	Duniya	Mohan Kumar		
1986	Dharm Adhikari	Dharamraj		
1986	Karma	Jailor Vishwanath Pratap Singh alias Rana alias Dada Thakur		
1989	Kanoon Apna Apna	Collector Jagatpratap Singh		
1990s
1990	Izzatdaar	Brahma Dutt		
1991	Saudagar	Thakur Veer Singh "Veeru"	Nominated—Filmfare Award for Best Actor	
1998	Qila	Judge Amarnath Singh and Jagannath Singh (Double Role)	Final film	
