= Dilip Kumar: The Substance and the Shadow =

Autobiography of the Indian actor and politician Dilip Kumar

- Author: Udaya Tara Nayar
- Language: English
- Subject: Dilip Kumar
- Genre: Autobiography
- Published: 20 June 2014
- Publisher: Hay House
- Publication place: India
- Media type: Print
- Pages: 450
- ISBN: 978-93-81398-86-9

Dilip Kumar: The Substance and the Shadow is a book about the filmmaker and politician Dilip Kumar that was written by the film journalist Udaya Tara Nayar. The first part of the book chronicles Kumar's and career; using first-person narrative, the autobiography chronicles Kumar's childhood in Peshawar, British India (present-day Pakistan); his education, his 62-year-long cinematic and political career, and his two marriages. The other part contains recollections from 43 of his collaborators and acquaintances. It was published on 20 June 2014 by Hay House.

The idea for the book occurred to Nayar in mid-2004, when he was helping to rearrange Kumar's bookshelf. Nayar picked up a biography of Kumar and found some inaccurate information in it; Kumar's wife Saira Banu suggested Nayar should write an autobiography instead. Dilip Kumar: The Substance and the Shadow is based on a series of conversations between Nayar and Kumar that occurred in Bandra that year. Critical reviews of the book were generally positive; the writing and the photographs garnered praise but Kumar's selectiveness was criticised.

== Summary ==
The book's first 25-chapter segment focuses on Dilip Kumar's life and career; he was born Yousuf Khan on 11 December 1922 in Peshawar, British India (now Pakistan), and, having been educated at Barnes School and Khalsa College, moved to Bombay (now Mumbai) following the partition of India in 1947. His acting debut came in the drama film Jwar Bhata (1944), in which he used the stage name "Dilip Kumar". Kumar's commercially and critically successful films include Andaz (1949), Tarana (1951), Aan (1952), Azaad (1955), Devdas (1955), Naya Daur (1957), Madhumati (1958), Kohinoor (1960), Mughal-e-Azam (1960), Gunga Jumna (1961), and Ram Aur Shyam (1967). Kumar's well-publicised six-year relationship with the actor Madhubala, his marriages to Saira Banu in 1966 and Asma Rehman in 1982, and his political career are also detailed. The book's second part includes commentary from 43 of Kumar's collaborators and acquaintances.

== Development and release ==
"It has always been an arduous task to prevail upon him to talk about himself ... I understand it is neither proper nor right for me to extol the virtues of the book ... the primary reason being my widely known admiration for my husband and the ardent pride ... I have always hung on to every word he has uttered to me or to anyone ... "

— Saira Banu in the foreword of the book^{:1}

In June 2004, Udaya Tara Nayar, a film journalist and former editor of Screen, was helping Saira Banu to rearrange Banu's husband Dilip Kumar's bookshelf. Occasionally, Nayar read Kumar's collection of poems, in both English and Urdu. Kumar picked up a biography of himself; he said the information in it was mostly incorrect, though the author claimed to know him personally. Banu, who had always wanted Kumar to write an autobiography, asked him to do so with enthusiasm. She believed his story would motivate young people "in any walk of life who have chased dreams of making it big in their chosen professions".^{:11}

Concurring with her idea, Kumar wanted someone to compile his own words. Banu recommended Nayar, who was both happy and frightened because Kumar rarely publicly talked about his personal life and achievements. Nayar thought Kumar's introversion was the main reason authors who write books on him use his interviews with the media and information from his close friends.^{:11–12} Writing an analytical column in Scroll.in, Gautam Chintamani said previous publications about Kumar are more about his career than his pre-acting and private lives.

Nayar began writing the book the same day. According to Nayar, who found Kumar's marriage to Banu the most interesting part of his life, said the "real picture began to emerge" as the writing continued.^{:12–13} The book was titled Dilip Kumar: The Substance and the Shadow, which according to Nayar was suggested by Kumar; the "substance" means Kumar's life as Yousuf Khan and the "shadow" is his life as Dilip Kumar, according to whom; "when we walk our shadow grows larger than our actual image". The Press Trust of India announced the book in 2012, and Hay House released it on 20 June 2014 with a hardcover book. Its Amazon Kindle version was released on 28 July 2014.

== Critical reception ==
Nayar's writing met with critical acclaim. Deepa Gahlot concluded: "The book ... is a precious addition to the Bollywood bookshelf—at least it all comes from the star himself and the words are not recycled." Arvind Gigoo of Daily News and Analysis commended Nayar for having "performed the role of an understanding Father Confessor". Madhu Jain from India Today called it "measured, evidently calibrated and impossibly calm". Mahbubar Rahman of The Independent said Dilip Kumar: The Substance and the Shadow "exceeds all expectations of readers" and is a "lucid reminiscence" that "is intricately laced with candid observation and comments which are uniquely his own". Jawed Naqvi of Dawn said the book is "crammed with ... abiding sentiment". Meghnad Desai praised Nayar for doing a good job, and Saibal Chatterjee from Tehelka said the book is a "goldmine of information". In The Free Press Journal, P. P. Ramachandran commented of the book's authentic and deep narration, calling it "outstanding". Raza Rumi of The Friday Times, conversely, said Nayar's writing is "mellow and somewhat dispassionate".

The contents and photographs were also praised. Gigoo described the book as "a captivating literary tour de force". Asif Noorani said the photographs, though not all present in fine quality, add to the book's value. Rumi spoke of Kumar's "reflective tone and tender voice that makes it a book worth reading", saying that the book sums up the history of Indian cinema of almost the twentieth century; she further said the "Reminiscences" part is interesting but that it needs more editing and that the photographs make the book more attractive. S. Nanda Kumar of Deccan Herald wrote that Kumar told his stories with attention to even the tiniest details, and likened the book's opening to the introduction of a film. and Ziya Us Salam, sharing similar thoughts, said it "sheds fair light on the person he is". Another Daily News and Analysis review, this time by Boski Gupta, labelled it a "treat for every cinema lover". Sanjukta Sharma, in her review for Mint, wrote:

The first few chapters ... have the architecture and visual breadth of a novel. He writes about his youth with self-deprecating honesty. Given the tone of the book until it reaches the phase of his youth, middle age and late life read like parodies. A voice so different, it seems someone else took over the project entirely. The last section of the book is a series of tributes by close friends—a strange section to have in an autobiography.

Kumar's selectiveness of giving information regarding his personal life was met with a somewhat mixed reception. The News International's Sarwat Ali gave a scathing comment, saying the book should have been written when Kumar was younger and had the energy to give more attention "to the final product which suffers badly from supervision in editing and graphic design". Ali bemoaned that some events of Kumar's life, such as his second marriage and his affair with Madhubala, are not explained detailly. Gahlot felt "it has the informality of a diary rather than a serious memoir". Baradwaj Rangan described Dilip Kumar: The Substance and the Shadow as "a lopsided autobiography" that "sheds light on his early life and career, but skimps on what we really want to know". According to Shahabuddin Gilani of The Express Tribune, Kumar was not entirely open in the book, having noted that many events he did not speak of in detail.

Sangeetha Devi Dundoo included it in her "Reading List" of the year in The Hindu.

== Sources ==
- Ali, Sarwat (27 July 2014). "The man behind the star". The News International.
- Beegum, Naseem (8 November 2017). "Meet Bollywood's no-gossiping journalist". Khaleej Times. Archived from the original on 10 March 2018.
- Chatterjee, Saibal (30 June 2014). "Thespian declares". Tehelka. Archived from the original on 27 September 2020.
- Chintamani, Gautam (30 November 2014). "Star biographies: can a film-star's life be an open book?". Scroll.in. Archived from the original on 3 May 2021.
- Desai, Meghnad (17 September 2014). "Dilip Kumar's autobiography reveals his journey from Peshawar to Bombay". The Indian Express. Archived from the original on 15 July 2021.
- "Dilip Kumar's biography to be launched". The Times of India. Press Trust of India. 27 June 2012. Archived from the original on 22 October 2021.
- Dundoo, Sangeetha Devi (23 November 2014). "Their stories, their voices". The Hindu. Archived from the original on 21 October 2021.
- Gahlot, Deepa (9 August 2014). "Dilip Kumar's autobiography is a precious addition to Bollywood bookshelf". Hindustan Times. Archived from the original on 27 September 2016.
- Gigoo, Arvind (20 July 2014). "Book review: The Substance and the Shadow – An Autobiography". Daily News and Analysis. Archived from the original on 9 July 2021.
- Gilani, Shahabuddin (7 December 2014). "Book review: The Substance and the Shadow – no holds barred". The Express Tribune. Archived from the original on 8 January 2016.
- Gupta, Boski (17 September 2014). "Book review: More shadow than substance". Daily News and Analysis. Archived from the original on 19 September 2014.
- Jain, Madhu (26 June 2014). "Dilip Kumar: Legend on the couch". India Today. Archived from the original on 30 July 2020.
- Kumar, S. Nanda (3 August 2014). "A tale of his own". Deccan Herald. Archived from the original on 22 October 2021.
- Naqvi, Jawed (29 July 2014). "Looks like the work of the wife". Dawn. Archived from the original on 15 June 2019.
- Nayar, Udaya Tara (20 June 2014). Dilip Kumar: The Substance and the Shadow. Hay House. ISBN 978-93-81398-86-9.
- Nayar, Udaya Tara (28 July 2014). Dilip Kumar: The Substance and the Shadow. Hay House. ISBN 978-93-81398-96-8.
- Noorani, Asif (28 July 2014). "Cover story: Dilip Kumar: The Substance and the Shadow". Dawn. Archived from the original on 28 May 2015.
- P., Nidhi (6 June 2014). "Interview: Udaya Tara Nayar". Glamsham. Archived from the original on 18 January 2021.
- Rahman, Mahbubar (19 June 2015). "Dilip Kumar: The Substance And The Shadow An Autobiography". The Independent. Archived from the original on 21 October 2021.
- Ramachandran, P. P. (29 June 2014). "Dilip Kumar". The Free Press Journal. Archived from the original on 22 October 2021.
- Rangan, Baradwaj (28 July 2014). "The king of tragedy". The Hindu. Archived from the original on 11 July 2021.
- Rumi, Raza (21 November 2014). "The legend's shadow". The Friday Times. Archived from the original on 21 October 2021.
- Salam, Ziya Us (13 March 2015). "Of Cinema Excelsior and a star without peer". The Hindu. Archived from the original on 14 July 2015.
- Sharma, Sanjukta (28 June 2014). "Amma's boy". Mint. Archived from the original on 24 July 2016.
