= Anthiveyilile Ponnu =

- Poster
- Directed by: Radhakrishnan (RK)
- Written by: Perumbadavam Sreedharan
- Based on: Perumpadavam Sreedharan's Novel; Anthiveyilile Ponnu
- Produced by: Monai Erali
- Starring: Kamal Haasan; Lakshmi; Jagathy Sreekumar; Kalpana
- Cinematography: Indu
- Edited by: A. Ramesan
- Music by: Salil Chowdhury
- Production company: Panchami Enterprises
- Distributed by: Panchami Enterprises
- Release date: 12 February 1982
- Country: India
- Language: Malayalam

Anthiveyilile Ponnu (transl. The Gold in the Dusk) is a 1982 Indian Malayalam-language film, directed by Radhakrishnan (RK) and produced by Panchami Enterprises. The film stars Kamal Haasan, Lakshmi, Jagathy Sreekumar and Kalpana. The film has musical score by Salil Chowdhury. The film was dubbed and released into Tamil-language as Ponmaalai Pozhudhu. The film was adapted from novel of same name by Perumpadavam Sreedharan.

== Cast ==
- Kamal Haasan
- Lakshmi
- Jagathy Sreekumar
- Kalpana
- Sankaradi
- Sukumaran
- Nithya
- M. A. Nishad (Child actor)

== Soundtrack ==
Anthiveyilile Ponnu

Soundtrack album by Salil Chowdhury
- Released: 1982
- Genre: Feature film soundtrack
- Language: Malayalam
- Label: AVM Music Service

The music was composed by Salil Chowdhury and the lyrics were written by O. N. V. Kurup.

No.	Song	Singers	Lyrics
1	"Allimalarkkaavil"	S. Janaki & Chorus	O. N. V. Kurup
2	"Bhoomithan Sangeetham Nee"	K. J. Yesudas, Sabitha Chowdhary & Chorus	O. N. V. Kurup
3	"Shraavaam Vannu"	K. J. Yesudas	O. N. V. Kurup
4	"Shraavanam Vannu" (Slow)	K. J. Yesudas	O. N. V. Kurup
