= Thulavarsham =

1976 film by N. Sankaran Nair

- Directed by: N. Sankaran Nair
- Written by: C. Radhakrishnan
- Produced by: Sobhana Parameswaran Nair
- Starring: Prem Nazir; Hema Choudhary; Sridevi; Sudheer; Kaviyoor Ponnamma; Prema
- Cinematography: J. Williams
- Edited by: V. P. Krishnan
- Music by: V. Dakshinamoorthy; Salil Chowdhary
- Production company: Sobhana Prem Combines
- Release date: 19 March 1976
- Country: India
- Language: Malayalam

Thulavarsham (transl. Rain in the month of Thula) is a 1976 Indian Malayalam-language film directed by N. Sankaran Nair and produced by Sobhana Parameswaran Nair. The film stars Prem Nazir, Hema choudhary, Sridevi, Sudheer, Kaviyoor Ponnamma, and Prema. The film has musical score by V. Dakshinamoorthy and Salil Chowdhary. This was the first Malayalam film where Sridevi played a leading role.

== Cast ==
- Prem Nazir as Balan
- Sridevi as Ammini
- Hema Chaudhary as Neeli
- Sudheer as Maniyan
- Kaviyoor Ponnamma as Balan's mother
- Prema Menon as Maniyan's mother
- Alummoodan as Balakrishnan Nair
- Anuradha
- Bahadoor as Ayyappan
- Kuthiravattam Pappu
- Premji
- Treesa

== Soundtrack ==
All music is composed by Salil Chowdhury and V. Dakshinamoorthy.

Track listing
No.	Title	Lyrics	Artist(s)	Length
1.	"Keli Nalinam (Salil)"	Vayalar Ramavarma	K. J. Yesudas
2.	"Maadathakkili (Dakshina)"	P. Bhaskaran	Selma George
3.	"Paarayidukkil Mannundo (Dakshina)"	P. Bhaskaran	S. Janaki, Kamala, Selma George
4.	"Swapnaadanam (Salil)"	Chowalloor Krishnankutty	S. Janaki
5.	"Yamune Nee Ozhukoo (Salil)"	Vayalar Ramavarma	K. J. Yesudas, S. Janaki
