= Udaya Tara Nayar =

- Born: Udaya Tara Nayar
- Parent: Shri S Ayyappan Pillai (father)

Udaya Tara Nayar is a film journalist in India.

== Career ==
=== Early career ===
In 2000, Nayar once again left Screen to help raise her grandchildren. It was at this time that Dilip Kumar approached her to write his biography, The Substance and the Shadow,

== Awards and honours ==
Nayar has won the following honours, recognitions and awards for her contribution to cinema journalism:

- Head of the National Jury for Books in the National Film Awards three times 1996, 1998 and 2004.
- Member of the Script Advisory Committee of Children's Film Society, India in 1998-1999.
- Member of the Advisory Council of Film and Television Institute of India in 1998-1999.
- Head of the Jury for the Aravindan Awards in Kerala.
- Honoured by the Chief Minister of Kerala, Shri A.K. Antony as a Global Malayalee in 2000, an award bestowed on distinguished Malayalees for their contribution to social betterment.
- The Best Junior Citizen award by the South Bombay Jaycees Committee in 1989 for creating a healthy trend in clean journalism.
- The Salaam Bombay Magazine award for the Best Cinema Journalist in 1989.
- The K.A. Abbas Memorial Award for Excellence in Film Journalism in 1989.
- The Priyanka Gandhi Award for Excellence in Film Journalism and championing of clean film journalism in 2004, given by the World of Priyanka Gandhi magazine.
- The 50th National Film Awards, presented by Directorate of Film Festivals, were announced by a committee headed by Prakash Jha, Rajiv Mehrotra and Udaya Tara Nayar for the feature films, non-feature films and books written on Indian cinema.
