= Thomasleeha =

1975 film by P. A. Thomas

- Poster of the film
- Directed by: P. A. Thomas
- Based on: Apocryphal missionary work of St. Thomas in India
- Produced by: P. A. Thomas
- Starring: Mohan Sharma; Thikkurissy Sukumaran Nair; Bahadoor
- Music by: Salil Chowdhury
- Release date: 19 July 1975
- Country: India
- Language: Malayalam

Thomasleeha (also known as St. Thomas) is a 1975 Indian Malayalam-language historical drama film based on the life of St. Thomas the Apostle and his missionary work in India. It was directed and produced by P. A. Thomas.

== Plot ==
The film tells the story of St. Thomas the Apostle who reached the Malabar Coast in AD 52 to spread the Gospel among the Jews and locals who are today known as Saint Thomas Christians or Nasranis. He eventually established the Ezharappallikal or Seven and Half Churches in Kerala. These churches are at Kodungallur, Palayoor, Kottakkavu (Paravur), Kokkamangalam, Niranam, Nilackal (Chayal), Kollam and Thiruvithamcode (half church). He became a martyr in AD 72, at St. Thomas Mount near Mylapore, Chennai.

== Cast ==
- Mohan Sharma as St. Thomas
- Thikkurissy Sukumaran Nair
- T. R. Omana
- Prathapachandran
- Unnimary
- Bahadoor
- Kanakadurga
- Murali
- T. G. Ravi
- Umesh Chandran
- Ushakumari
- Vidhubala

== Soundtrack ==
The music was composed by Salil Chowdhary and Sebastian Joseph.

No.	Song	Singers	Lyrics	Length (m:ss)
1	"Dhoomthana"	Vani Jayaram	Vayalar	
2	"Dukhithare Peedithare"	K. J. Yesudas, Chorus	Vayalar	
3	"Malayattoor Malayumkeri"	K. P. Brahmanandan, Selma George, Zero Babu, Ramani	Kedamangalam Sadanandan	
4	"Vrischikappenne"	K. J. Yesudas, Sabitha Chowdhary	Vayalar	
