= Madhuri Chattopadhyay =

Srimati Madhuri Chattopadhyay

Background information
- Born: 16 December 1939; Calcutta, Bengal, British India
- Died: 19 October 2013 (aged 73) Kolkata, West Bengal, India
- Genre: Playback singer
- Occupation: Singer

Madhuri Chattopadhyay (16 December 1940 – 19 October 2013) was a Bengali singer from Kolkata, who sang numerous songs in popular Bengali language during the 1960s, 1970s and 1980s. Madhuri Chattopadhyay is noted for her contribution in Geet, Gazal, Bengali Modern Songs, light Classical songs, Najrul Geeti and Rabindra Sangeet. She was playback singer for a few Bengali movies. She also published album in Shyama Sangeet in later years.

== Family ==
Her father is Shibnath Bandyopadhyay, her husband is Arun Kumar Chattopadhyay, and her daughter is Rupa Chattopadhyay.

== Early life ==
According to the accounts of Shankarlal Bhattacharya, Madhuri was born in a nursing home in Park Street, and was raised in her maternal uncle's house in Balaram Bose Ghat Road in North Kolkata in her early years. Her father Sri Shibnath Bandyopadhyay was a famous Kirtaniya (Kirtan Singer), and her main inspiration. Since her early years Madhuri was trained in Hindusthani Classical Music under eminent artists such as singer Uma De, Ustad Keramatullah Khan and Pandit Harihar Shuklaji. Apart from her father, she was trained in Kirtan from eminent singer Sri Rathin Ghosh.

== Singer ==
Madhuri appeared in the audition in All India Radio in 1955 and started her career as a singer at the age of fourteen. In 1959 she was offered to publish her first record from Megaphone as Puja album. Music for the two songs were composed by Nachiketa Ghosh. "Oli omon kore noy" and "Tomay amay prothom dekha", these two songs became legends on their first appearance and created a permanent place in the romantic psyche of Bengalis. In the first disk her name was mentioned as Madhuri Bandyopadhyay.

Madhuri was introduced to Salil Chowdhury by Sri Kamal Ghosh, owner of Megaphone Records. in 1961 Madhuri published her Puja Album with two songs composed by Salil Chowdhury, "Nijere haraye khuNji" and "Ebar amar somoy holo jabar". In the same year she married Sri Arun Kumar Chattopadhyay.

Madhuri sang a few songs of Salil Chowdhury. Salilda while composing "Oi je sobuj bono bithika" that spans two and a half octaves, used glimpses of Beethoven's 6th symphony (Pastorale) in the interlude, that blended with Madhuri's voice.

== Playback singer in Bengali movies ==
Maestro Rathin Ghosh was Guru of Madhuri Chattopadhyay and under his music direction Madhuri appeared as playback singer in the Bengali movie "Moha Teertha Kalighat" in 1964. It was a chorus song sang along with Nilima Bandopadhyay, Binay Adhikary and Manas Mukhopadhyay. In the same year she sang in Bengali movie "Radhakrishna". In 1965 she sang in "Rup Sanatan" a kirtan. Manabendra Mukhopadhyay gave her a break in the movie "Uttor Purush" in 1966. The song, "ekbar broje chalo Brajeswar", became immense popular. Other movies where she lent her voice were "Shachimar Sonsar" (1971), "Swarnaa Mahal" (1982), "Tania" (1987) etc.

== Events and memoirs ==
Pratima Bandopadhyay presented Sundar Narayan Bandyopadhyay Smriti Sandhya on 13 July 2010, at 6 pm at Vidya Mandir hall. Madhuri Chattopadhyay was felicitated on that occasion for her lifetime achievement. In spite of her unmatched talent and her outstanding renditions, Madhuri Chattopadhyay kept herself away from the spotlight of media and publicity.

== Discography ==
Madhuri Chattopadhyay Discography
Song	Year	Film/album	Lyrics	Music
Aaji sharater aakashe		-		
Amar Sandhya Pradip (Original song by Gayatri Basu)		-	Pranab Roy	Rabin Chattopadhyay
Bou kotha kao	1975	-	Gauriprasanna Majumdar	Anupam Ghatak
Ebar amar somoy holo	1960	-		Salil Chowdhury
Ek phota chokher jole			Subir Hazra	Salil Mitra
Ekbar broje chalo Brajeswar	1966	"Uttor Purush"		Manabendra Mukhopadhyay
Ekti kothai likhe jabo	1955		Gauriprasanna Majumdar	Shyamal Mitra
Emoni borosha chhilo se din	1975	-	Pranab Roy	Kamal Dasgupta
Ganga sindhu narmada	1972	Nazrul geeti	Nazrul Islam	Nazrul Islam
Gun gun phalgun	1967	-	Salil Chowdhury	Salil Chowdhury
Jani na aaj prane	-	-		Rabin Chattopadhyay
Je mala shukaye (original song by Talat Mahmood 1956)	-	-	Pabitra Mitra	Shyamal Mitra
Jedin jibone tumi	-	-	Shyamal Gupta	Satinath Mukhopadhyay
Jethay gele haray sobai	-		Shyamal Gupta	Satinath Mukhopadhyay
Joubane mou jhore	1969	-	Lakshikanta Roy	Himangshu Biswas
Ke tumi amare dako	-	-	Gauriprasanna Majumdar	Anupam Ghatak
Ki aar kohibo balo	-	-		
Kon banshuriya banshite amay	1968	-	Pulak Bandyopadhyay	Ratu Mukhopadhyay
Kono kono phul subas diye	-	-	Biggnaswar Bhattacharya	Krishna Chattopadhyay
Kuhu kuhu koyel jodi daake	1969	-	Lakshikanta Roy	Himangshu Biswas
Nijere haraye khNuji	1960	-		Salil Chowdhury
Ogo aaj ei sondhyay	-	-		
Ogo shuni tabo banshi	-	-		Rabin Chattopadhyay
Oi banka nodi	-	-		
Oli omon kore noy	1959	Puja album	Pulak Bandyopadhyay	Nachiketa Ghosh
Ore o shaapla phul	-	-		
Paarul bon aamar	-	-		
Phul phutuk na phutuk aaj basanto	-	-	Subhas Mukhopadhyay	Jatileswar Mukhopadhyay
Protidin ami tomay dekhi	-	-		
Sanjher taroka ami (original song by Juthika Roy 1934)	1968	-	Pranab Roy	Kamal Dasgupta
Tomay amay prothom dekha	1959	Puja album	Pulak Bandyopadhyay	Nachiketa Ghosh
Tumi nai aaj		-	Shyamal Gupta	Ratu Mukhopadhyay

== Awards ==
Srimati Madhuri Chattopadhyay was awarded with "Sangeet Samman" by Government of West Bengal in 2012.
