= Anokha Milan =

- Poster
- Directed by: Jagganath Chatterjee
- Produced by: R. J. Vazirani
- Starring: Dilip Kumar; Dharmendra
- Edited by: Waman B. Bhosle
- Music by: Salil Choudhury
- Release date: 1972
- Country: India
- Language: Hindi

Anokha Milan is a 1972 Hindi film produced by R. J. Vazirani and directed by Jagganath Chatterjee. The film is a remake of director's own 1966 Bengali film Paari which was based on a story by Jarasandha and which also had the same cast as the original version. The film stars Dharmendra, Pronati Ghosh and Dilip Kumar in a guest appearance. This is the only Hindi movie that Dilip Kumar and Dharmendra appeared together in and was the second movie they appeared together after Paari. The film's music is by Salil Choudhury.

== Plot ==
Tara Sen lives in a small town in India with her parents, a younger brother, sister and an elder brother who lives in Calcutta. She is friendly with Ghanshyam, affectionately called "Ghana", and often spends time with him near the river bank. When her brother returns home, he brings along a friend named Bijesh, who takes a liking to Tara and molests her. He is asked to leave the very next day, but the news spreads like wildfire, resulting in her parents to decide to get her married immediately, in vain though, as no one wants to come forward to marry her. During the Devi Pooja ceremonies, people crowd around the Sen household and spread vicious rumors about Tara, Ghana does not take kindly to this, a fight ensues, and a man is killed. The police are summoned, Ghana is arrested and held in prison. Sen attempts to reason with the local Police Inspector Badal Gupta, known for womanizing and being an alcoholic, who agrees to withdraw all charges provided Tara marries him. Sen is reluctant, but Tara readily accepts, and their marriage takes place. Tara's husband does not give up on his bad habits, neither does he fulfill his promise of releasing Ghana. One day an argument ensues between Tara and him, followed by a struggle, blows are exchanged, with Tara hitting him on the head with an axe. He is hospitalized and Tara is arrested, but when he regains consciousness he refuses to press charges, then subsequently succumbs to his injuries and Tara is sentenced to prison. When she finds out that Ghana is doing time in Andamans, she requests a transfer there, which is granted. When she reaches Andamans, she is told by the Warden that the only way she can meet with Ghana is by marrying him. But Ghana is old-fashioned and refuses to marry Tara on grounds that she is wealthy and he a lowly servant. Tara now has an option - return home and live alone for the rest of her life, or kill herself.

== Cast ==
- Dilip Kumar... Warden (Guest Appearance)
- Brahm Bhardwaj... Voice
- Abhi Bhattacharya... Anant Sen
- Dharmendra... Ghanshyam "Ghana"
- Pranoti Ghosh... Tara Sen / Tara Gupta (as Pronoti)
- Raj Mehra... Voice
- Shivraj... Voice

== Soundtrack ==
Song title	Singer
"Bandhu Re Ye Mann Dole"	Manna Dey
"Mann Na More Sata"	Sabita Chowdhury
