= Salil Chowdhury =

Indian music director and singer (1922–1995)

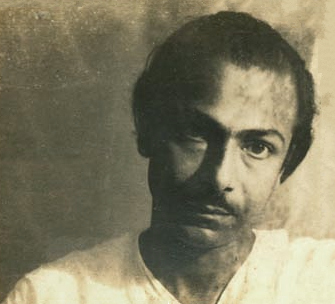

Background information
- Born: 19 November 1925; Ghazipur, 24 Parganas, Bengal Presidency, British India (present-day Baruipur, South 24 Parganas, West Bengal, India)
- Died: 5 September 1995 (aged 69) Calcutta, West Bengal, India
- Genres: Bengali, folk, film base, western classical fusion, Indian classical fusion
- Occupations: Singer-Songwriter, Composer, Arranger, Poet, Lyricist, Story-writer

Salil Chowdhury (19 November 1925 – 5 September 1995) was an Indian music director, songwriter, lyricist, writer and poet who predominantly composed for Bengali, Hindi and Malayalam films. He composed music for films in 13 languages. This includes over 75 Hindi films, 41 Bengali films, 27 Malayalam films, and a few Marathi, Tamil, Telugu, Kannada, Gujarati, Odia and Assamese films. His musical ability was widely recognised in the Indian film industry. He was an accomplished composer and arranger who was proficient in several musical instruments, including the flute, the piano, and the esraj. He was also widely acclaimed and admired for his inspirational and original poetry in Bengali.

The first Bengali film for which Chowdhury composed music was Paribortan, released in 1949. Mahabharati, released in 1994, was the last of the 41 Bengali films where he rendered his music. He is affectionately called Salilda by his admirers. He mentored famous music directors like R. D. Burman and Hridaynath Mangeshkar.

== Career ==
=== Early influences – childhood and teenage ===
Salil Chowdhury was born on 19 November 1925, in a village called Ghazipur in South 24 Parganas, West Bengal. Salil's childhood was spent in the Tea Gardens Region of Assam. His father was reputed to stage plays with coolies and other low-paid workers of the tea-gardens. While his father, Dr Gyanendra Chowdhury, was the Medical Officer at Hathikuli Tea Estate near Kaziranga in Assam, between 1931 and 1951, the Chief Medical Officer was Dr Maloni, an Irish national. During his early years, he used to listen to western orchestral music on Dr Maloni's gramophone. To date, this information stands engraved in black granite in Hathikuli Tea Estate in his memory. During the second world war Chowdhury got the opportunity to closely observe human sufferings, hunger and problem of the refugees. He studied in Harinavi D.V.A.S High School and there after graduating from Bangabasi College, affiliated to the University of Calcutta in Kolkata, and during this period his political ideas were formulated along with a considerable maturity in his musical ideas.

As a teenager in school, Chowdhury already had an interest in music, and played the flute, harmonium and esraj. He learnt to play the piano from his elder brother at the age of 6. Once in college, he also began to compose tunes. His first popular song was "Becharpoti tomar bichaar" (lit. the days of new judgement have come because people are now awake), set to a kirtan tune. Chowdhury composed it in 1945 during the Indian National Army trials when the freedom fighters had returned from Andaman jail. Chowdhury shifted to a village in 24 Parganas to live with his maternal uncles, when he was witness to a big peasant uprising there in 1943. He got involved with them and began writing songs for the peasant movement. In 1944, while studying for his MA, Chowdhury witnessed people dying on the streets of Calcutta, as 50 lakh Bengalis died during the famine. The famine was human-made as local rice was instead directed to Britain's war effort overseas, leading to scarcity, aggravated by black marketeers and hoarders. This led Chowdhury to become fully involved in the peasant movement, and he became a full-time member of IPTA and the Communist Party. Subsequently, arrest warrants were issued in his name, and he went underground in the Sunderbans, hiding in paddy fields and supported by local peasants. During this time, he continued writing plays and songs.

In 1944, a young Salil came to Calcutta for his graduate studies. He joined the IPTA (Indian Peoples Theater Association) the cultural wing of the Communist Party of India. He started writing songs and setting tunes for them. The IPTA theatrical outfit travelled through the villages and the cities bringing these songs to the common man. Songs like Bicharpati, Runner and Abak prithibi became extremely popular with the general population at the time.

Songs like Gnaayer bodhu (গাঁয়ের বধূ), which he composed at the age of 20, brought about a new wave of Bengali music. Almost every notable singer at the time from West Bengal had sung at least one of his songs. A few examples are Debabrata Biswas, Kishore Kumar, Manna Dey, Hemanta Mukherjee, Shyamal Mitra, Sandhya Mukherjee, Manabendra Mukherjee, Subir Sen and Pratima Banerjee.

=== Film career ===
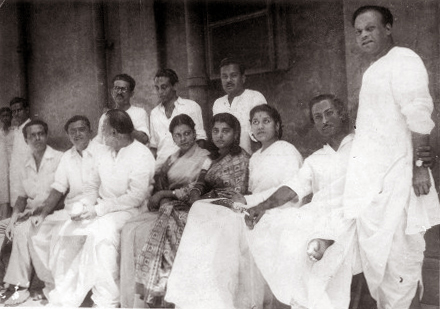
Sitting from left: Robin Majumdar, Bhanu Banerjee, Robin Chatterjee, Ila Bose, Bani Ghoshal, Sabita Chowdhury and Salil Chowdhury Standing from left: V. Balsara, Shyamal Mitra, Montu Bose and Jahar Roy

The first Bengali film in which Salil Chowdhury composed music was Paribortan, released in 1949. Mahabharati, released in 1994, was the last of the 41 Bengali films where he rendered his music.

Shortly after, he was kidnapped at 21 Manor House Court for 3 days.

In an interview with All India Radio, Salil Chowdhury described his coming to Bombay in 1953 as a "stroke of luck". He was writing the script for a Bengali film about a peasant who was disowned of his land and had gone to Calcutta to earn money as a Rickshaw puller. Hrishikesh Mukherjee, who heard of it from Chowdhury during a visit to Calcutta, liked it immensely and suggested that he narrate it to the director Bimal Roy. Roy heard it, and asked him to meet him again the next morning. However, when Chowdhury went to meet him the next day, he learnt that Roy had rushed to Bombay on an urgent call. A week later, he received a telegram from Roy that he wanted to turn his script into a movie. This resulted in Chowdhury's debut in the Hindi film industry in 1953 as the music director for Do Bigha Zamin (1953). The movie was based on Tagore's poem by the same name, but the story was different and was written by Salil Chowdhury himself. Directed by Bimal Roy, this film took his career to new heights when it became the first film to win the Filmfare Best Movie Award and won the international Prize at the Cannes Film Festival.

After working for about 20 years in Bengali and Hindi films, he entered the Malayalam film industry and, in 1964, composed music for the movie Chemmeen. He went on to compose music for films in 13 languages. This includes over 75 Hindi films, 41 Bengali films, around 27 Malayalam films, and a few Marathi, Tamil, Telugu, Kannada, Gujarati, Odia and Assamese films. Asked about his method, Chowdhury described it thus – He would usually ask the film maker to explain the situation to him, then Chowdhury would compose a tune to suit the mood, and the lyric writer would set in words. This remained his practice for most of his films including Madhumati, in which Shailendra wrote the lyrics subsequently.

During the 1971 Bangladesh Liberation War, Chowdhury contributed to the programmes of the Swadhin Bangla Betar Kendra based in Kolkata. His 1971 album Bangla Amar Bangla was meant for the liberation struggle. Later, when Chowdhury visited Bangladesh in 1990, he was given the welcome of a mass leader in Dhaka. Chowdhury was posthumously awarded the Muktijoddha Maitreye Samman in 2012.

Poet, Playwright, Short story writer, Salil also directed a film Pinjre Ke Panchhi starring Meena Kumari, Balraj Sahani and Mehmood based on his own story and screenplay in 1966. Salil Chowdhury was the Founder of Bombay Youth Choir, the first ever Secular Choir in India in 1958 as its composer and conductor - he inspired scores of secular choir groups to be formed throughout India formulating a new genre of music using vocal polyphony for Indian Folk and Contemporary Music.

== Personal life ==
Salil Chowdhury married his first wife, the painter Jyoti Chowdhury in July 1952; the couple had three daughters named Aloka, Tulika, and Lipika. Salil and Jyoti later separated, and he married singer Sabita Chowdhury, with whom he had two sons, Sukanta and Sanjoy, and two daughters, Antara and Sanchari. Sanjoy Chowdhury is a music composer and has scored background music for over 100 feature films. Antara Chowdhury too is a well-known musician and singer. Jyoti Chowdhury never married again and she died at the age of 94 on January 7, 2023. Sabita Chowdhury died on 29 June 2017.

== Legacy ==
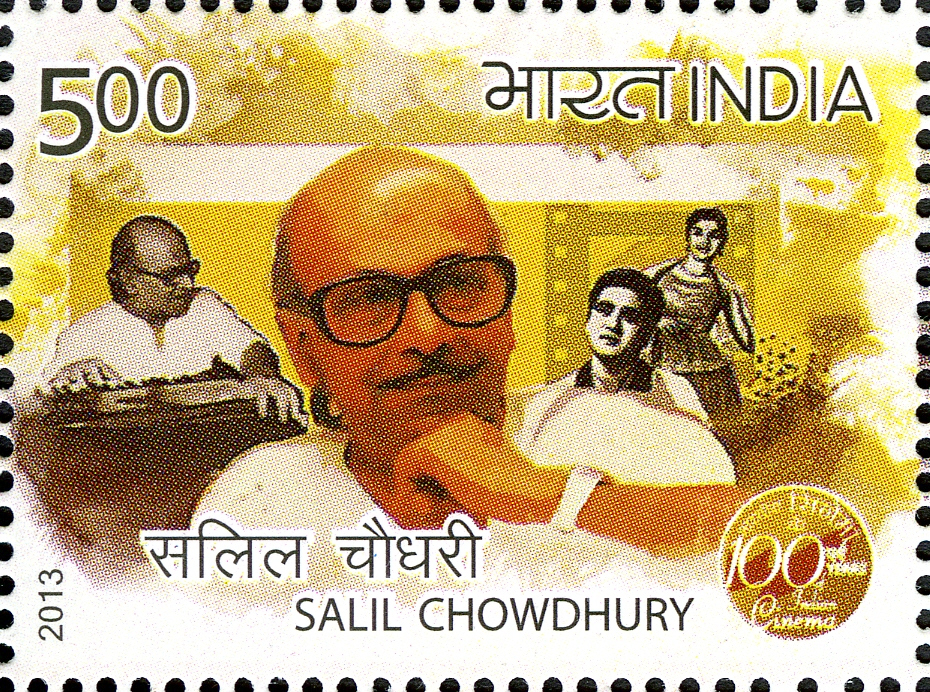
Chowdhury on a 2013 stamp of India

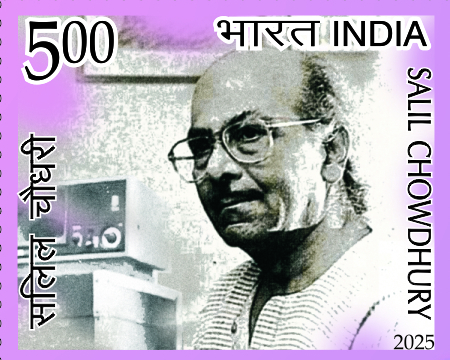
Chowdhury on a 2025 stamp of India

- Salil's music was a blending of Eastern and the Western music traditions. He had once said: "I want to create a style which shall transcend borders – a genre which is emphatic and polished, but never predictable". He dabbled in a lot of things and it was his ambition to achieve greatness in everything he did. But at times, his confusion was fairly evident: "I do not know what to opt for: poetry, story writing, orchestration or composing for films. I just try to be creative with what fits the moment and my temperament", he once told a journalist.
- Salil's love for Western classical music started when he was a young boy growing up in an Assam tea garden where his father worked as a doctor. His father inherited a large number of western classical records and a gramophone from a departing Irish doctor. While Salil listened to Mozart, Beethoven, Tchaikovsky, Chopin and others everyday, his daily life was surrounded by the sound of the forest, chirping of the birds, sound of the flute and the local folk-music of Assam. This left a lasting impression in young Salil. He became a self-taught flute player and his favourite composer was Mozart. His compositions often used folk melodies or melodies based on Indian classical ragas but the orchestration was very much western in its construction. According to his daughter Antara, (Ref.: Ek Fankar @ Vividbharati Radio Programme at 10.00 pm on 19 November 2013), Salil himself once joked that he was Mozart, reborn.
- Salil being a composing exponent, he even sensed the talent of a guitarist who played in his orchestra and uttered that, "I think he's going to be the best composer in India". The guitarist eventually turned out to be maestro Ilaiyaraaja. A. R. Rahman's father, R. K. Shekhar used to conduct Salil Chowdhury's arrangements in South Indian film music. Rahman once said that his musical understanding was greatly influenced by the musical sessions conducted by Salil Chowdhury.
- "The Salil Chowdhury Foundation of Music, Social Help & Education Trust" was created in 2002 by Sabita Chowdhury, wife, and Antara Chowdhury, daughter of the late composer, to carry forward the legacy and preserve the works of Salil Chowdhury. In 2015 the Salil Chowdhury Memorial Concert and Honours were established in memory of the Genius to honour some of the greatest Indian singers and musicians.

== Filmography ==
Salil Chowdhury Filmography
Year	Title	Language	Other Notes	Director
1949	Poribartan	Bengali		Satyen Bose
1951	Barjatri	Bengali		Satyen Bose
1952	Pasher Bari	Bengali		
1953	Bansher Kella	Bengali		
1953	Bhore hoye elo	Bengali		
1953	Do Bigha Zamin	Hindi		Bimal Roy
1954	Biraaj bahu	Hindi		Bimal Roy
1954	Naukari	Hindi		
1954	Aaj Sondhyay	Bengali		
1954	Mohila Mahal	Bengali		
1954	Monohara	Tamil		
1955	Amaanat	Hindi		
1955	Ek Din Ratre	Bengali		Shombhu Mitra and Amit Moitra
1955	Tangewali	Hindi		
1955	Rikshawala	Bengali	Story written by Salil Chowdhury. In 1952 story was used by Bimal Roy to create "Do Bigha Zameen"	Satyen Bose
1956	Raat Bhore	Bengali		Mrinal Sen
1956	Parivar	Hindi		
1956	Jagte Raho	Hindi		
1956	Aawaz	Hindi		
1957	Apradhi Kaun?	Hindi		
1957	Ek Gaon Ki Kahani	Hindi		Dulal Guha
1957	Gotoma the Buddha	Hindi	A documentary film	
1957	Lal Batti	Hindi		
1957	Musafir	Hindi		Hrishikesh Mukherjee
1957	Zamaana	Hindi		
1958	Bari Theke Paliye	Bengali		
1958	Madhumati	Hindi	Won – Filmfare Award for Best Music Director	Bimal Roy
1959	Heeramoti	Hindi		
1959	The River	Hindi		
1960	Jawaahar	Hindi		
1960	Gangaa	Bengali		Rajen Tarafdar
1960	Parakh	Hindi		
1960	Honeymoon	Hindi		
1960	Kanoon	Hindi	Background Score only.	B. R. Chopra
1960	Usne Kaha Tha	Hindi		Moni Bhattacharjee
1961	Rai Bahadur	Bengali		
1961	Kabuliwala	Hindi	From – Tagore's story Kabuliwala in Bengali film 1960	
1961	Char Diwari	Hindi		
1961	Chhaya	Hindi		Hrishikesh Mukherjee
1961	Maya	Hindi		
1961	Mem-Didi	Hindi		
1961	Sapne Suhane	Hindi		
1962	Half Ticket	Hindi		
1962	Sunbai	Marathi		
1962	Jhoola	Hindi		
1962	Prem Patra	Hindi	– From a Bengali film " Sagarika"	
1964	Kinu Goaalaar Goli	Bengali		
1964	Ayanaanto	Bengali		
1964	Lal Pathore	Bengali		
1965	Chand Aur Suraj	Hindi		
1965	Poonam Ki Raat	Hindi		
1966	Paari	Bengali		
1966	Pinjre Ke Panchhi	Hindi		
1966	Netaji Subhash Chandra Bose	Hindi		
1966	Jawaab Aayega	Hindi		
1965	Chemmeen	Malayalam		
1968	Mitti Ka Dev	Hindi		
1968	Anokhi Raat	Hindi	Background Score only	
1968	Chehere	Hindi	TV series	
1968	Ezhu Rathrikal	Malayalam		
1969	Ittefaq	Hindi	Background Score only	
1969	Sara Akash	Hindi	Background Score only	
1970	Abhayam	Malayalam	Background Score only	
1970	Aparajeyo	Assamese		CHATURANGA – Phani Talukdar, Munin Bayan, Atul Bardaloi & Gauri Barman
1971	Anand	Hindi		Hrishikesh Mukherjee
1971	Samshaya Phala	Kannada	Won – Karnataka State Film Award for Best Music Director	
1971	Uyir	Tamil	Background Score only	
1971	Gehraa Raaz	Hindi		
1971	Mere Apne	Hindi		
1971	Ghar Sansaar	Gujarati		
1972	Marjina Aabdullah	Bengali		
1972	Raktaakto Banglaa	Bengali		
1972	Anokha Milan	Hindi		
1972	Mere Bhaiya	Hindi		
1972	Sabse Bada Sukh	Hindi		
1972	Annadata	Hindi		
1972	Anokha Daan	Hindi		
1973	Swapnam	Malayalam		
1973	Achanak	Hindi	Background Score only	
1973	Karumbu	Tamil		
1974	Nellu	Malayalam		
1974	Chairman Chalamayya	Telugu		
1974	Rajnigandha	Hindi		
1975	Rasaleela	Malayalam		
1975	Sangat	Hindi		
1975	Mausam	Hindi	Background Score only	
1975	Chhoti Si Baat	Hindi		
1979	Pratheeksha	Malayalam		
1975	Neela Ponman	Malayalam		
1975	Onde Roopa Eradu Guna	Kannada		
1975	Raagam	Malayalam		
1975	Thomasleeha	Malayalam		
1976	Jeevan Jyoti	Hindi		
1976	Udaan Chhoo	Hindi		
1976	Thulavarsham	Malayalam		
1977	Kobita	Bengali		Bharat Shamsher
1977	Minoo	Hindi		
1977	Sister	Bengali		
1977	Mrigayaa	Hindi		
1977	Anand Mahal	Hindi		
1977	Aparadhi	Malayalam		
1977	Chinna Ninna Muddaduve	Kannada		
1977	Dweep	Malayalam	Background score only	
1977	Vishukkani	Malayalam		
1977	Kokila	Kannada		
1978	Ee Ganam Marakkumo	Malayalam		
1978	Madanolsavam	Malayalam		
1978	Naukri	Hindi	Background Score. Also Story Writer	
1978	Samayamayilla Polum	Malayalam		
1978	Etho Oru Swapnam	Malayalam		
1979	Jibon Je Rakam	Bengali		
1979	Rupaali Soikate	Bengali		Alamgir Kabir
1979	Srikaanter Will	Bengali		
1979	Azhiyadha Kolangal	Tamil		
1979	Chuvanna Chirakukal	Malayalam		
1979	Kaala Patthar	Hindi	Background Score only	
1979	Jeena Yahan	Hindi		
1979	Puthiya Velicham	Malayalam		
1980	Byapika Bidaay	Bengali		
1980	Parabesh	Bengali		
1980	Antarghaat	Bengali		
1980	Air Hostess	Malayalam		
1980	Doorathu Idi Muzhakkam	Tamil		
1981	Agni Pareeksha	Hindi		
1981	Akaler Sandhaney (In Search of Famine)	Bengali		Mrinal Sen
1981	Chehre Pe Chehra	Hindi	Background Score only	
1981	Batasi Jhada	Odia		
1981	Plot No. 5	Hindi	Background Score only	
1982	Artap	Bengali		
1982	Anthiveyilile Ponnu	Malayalam		
1984	Kanoon Kya Karega	Hindi	Background Score only	
1984	Vellam	Malayalam	Background Score only	
1985	Protiggya	Bengali		
1985	Debikaa	Bengali		
1985	Mowchor	Bengali		
1985	Manas Kanya	Assamese		Phani Talukdar
1986	Jibon	Bengali		
1987	Zevar	Hindi	Background Score only	
1988	Trishagni	Hindi		
1989	Swarnatrishaa	Bengali		
1989	Aakhri Badla	Hindi		
1989	Kamla Ki Maut	Hindi	Background Score only	
1990	Nehru: The Jewel of India	Hindi		
1990/91	Aashrita	Bengali	Background Score only	
1991	Haaraaner Naatjamaai	Bengali		
1991/92	Thamburan	Malayalam		
1991	Vasthuhara	Malayalam		
1994	Mahabharoti	Bengali		
1994	Sei Somoy	Bengali		
1994	Triyacharitra	Hindi		
1994	Swami Vivekananda	Hindi		G. V. Iyer
1995	Thumboli Kadappuram	Malayalam		
1995	Mera Damad	Hindi		
1995	Agar Aisa Ho Toh	Hindi	Television series	

Bengali

Year	Film
1949	Poribartan
1951	Barjaatri
1952	Paasher Baadi
1953	Baansher Kella
1953	Bhor Hoye Elo
1954	Aaj Sondhaay
1954	Mohila Mahal
1955	Rickshawaala
1956	Raat Bhore
1956	Ak din Raatre
1959	Baadi Thekey Paaliye
1960	Gangaa
1961	Rai Bahadur
1964	Kinu Goaalaar Goli
1964	Ayanaanto
1964	Laal Paathor
1966	Paari
1972	Marjina Aabdullah
1972	Raktaakto Banglaa (made in Bangladesh)
1977	Kobita
1977	Sister
1979	Jibon Je Rakam;Rupaali Soikate (made in Bangladesh)
1979	Srikaanter Will
1980	Byapika Bidaay
1980	Parabesh
1980	Akaler Sandhaney
1980	Antarghaat
1982	Artap
1985	Protiggya
1985	Debikaa
1985	Mowchor
1986	Jibon
1989	Swarnatrishaa
1990/91	Aashrita **(background: Salil) (MD:Hridaynath Mangeskar)
1991	Haaraaner Naatjamaai
1994	Mahabharoti
1994	Sei Somoy
1961	Komol Gandhaar
1981	Aswamedher Ghoraa

Malayalam

Year	Film
1965	Chemmeen
1968	Ezhuraathrikal
1970	Abhayam
1973	Swapnam
1974	Nellu
1975	Neelaponman
1975	Raagam
1975	Rasaleela
1975	Thomasleeha / St. Thomas)
1976	Aparadhi
1976	Thulavarsham
1977	Dweepu (background music only)
1977	Vishukkanni
1978	Samayamayilla polum
1978	Etho Oru Swapnam
1978	Madanolsavam
1978	Devdasi (Unreleased)
1978	Ee Ganam Marakkumo
1978	Chuvanna Chirakukal
1979	Pratheeksha
1979	Puthiya Velicham
1980	Air Hostess
1982	Anthiveyilile Ponnu
1985	Vellam (background music only)
1991	Vasthuhara (background music only)
1992	Thamburan (Unreleased)
1995	Thumboli Kadappuram

Others

Language	Year	Film
Tamil	1971	Uyir (Salilda composed background music only - MD was Ramana Sridhar)
Tamil	1973	Karumbu
Tamil	1978	Paruvamazhai
Tamil	1979	Azhiyatha Kolangal
Tamil	1980	Thooraththu Idimuzhakkam
Telugu	1974	Chairman Chalamayya
Telugu	1978	Amara Prema
Kannada	1971	Samsayaphala
Kannada	1975	Onde Rupa Eradu Guna
Kannada	1977	Chinna Ninna Muddaduve & Kokila
Gujarati	1978	Ghar Sansaar
Assamese	1970	Aparajeyo
Assamese	1985 1989	Manas Kanya Bangshadhar (Background Score)
Odia	1981	Batasi Jhada
Marathi	1962	Sunbai

== Discography ==
List of some songs for which music or lyrics were composed by Salil Chowdhury (in alphabetical order)

Salil Chowdhury Discography
Year	Song	Singer	Language	Film/album	Lyrics	Versions/Music
1962	Aa rahe the	Kishore Kumar	Hindi	Half Ticket	Shailendra	Salil Chowdhury
1946	Aage chalo aage chalo	Chorus	Bangla	IPTA	Salil Chowdhury	Salil Chowdhury
1963	Aaji soroter akaashey	Madhuri Chattopadhyay	Bangla	Puja album	Salil Chowdhury	Salil Chowdhury
1958	Aaja Re Pardesi	Lata Mangeshkar	Hindi	Madhumati	Shailendra	Salil Chowdhury
1953	Aaja tu aa	Lata Mangeshkar	Hindi	Do Bigha Zameen (Story written by Salil Chowdhury "Rikshawala")	Salil ChowdhuryShailendra	Salil Chowdhury
1953	Aajab teri duniya	Md Rafi with Chorus	Hindi	Do Bigha Zameen (Story written by Salil Chowdhury "Rikshawala")	Shailendra	Salil Chowdhury
1954	Aaji shunye gagan pothe	–	Bangla	Mohila Mahal	Salil Chowdhury	Salil Chowdhury
1962	Aa ke seedhi lagi dil pe jaise	Kishore Kumar	Hindi	Half Ticket	Shailendra	Salil Chowdhury
1961	Aakela tujhe jaane na du	Lata	Hindi	Chaar Deewaari	Shailendra	Salil Chowdhury
1961	Aankho mein masti sharaab ki	Talat Mahmood	Hindi	Chhayaa	Rajinder Krishan	Salil Chowdhury
1962	Aankhon mein tum dil mein tum ho	Gita and Kishore	Hindi	Half Ticketn	Shailendra	Bengali: Ei haashi ei gaan (1995) by Usha Utthup
1945	Aalor desh thekey aandhaar paar hoyee	Chorus	Bangla	IPTA	Salil Chowdhury	Salil Chowdhury
1962	Aamar e jibone shudhu	Jatileswar Mukhopadhyay	Bangla			Salil Chowdhury
1953	Aamar kichhu moner asha	Utpala Sen	Bangla	-		Hindi: Chale thumak thumak - Hindi (1957) Lata Mangeskar (Ek Gaaon Ki Kahaani)
1953	Aamay kichhu khete dao ma	Mahananda Baul	Bangla	Bhor Hoye Elo		Salil Chowdhury
1955	Aamay Proshno Kore Neel Dhrubotara	Hemanta Mukherjee	Bangla	Sera Shilpi Sera Gaan	Salil Chowdhury	Hindi: Kahin Door Jab Din Dhal Jaaye from Anand (1971 film) by Mukesh
1962	Aami paarini bujhite paarini	Manobendra Mukhopadhyay	Bangla	-	-	Hindi: Teri yaad na dil se jaa saki (1965) by Lata in Chaand Aur Sooraj
1949	Aamra kishore dal	Chorus	Bangla	Poribartan	Bimal Ghosh	Salil Chowdhury
1962	Arey, waah mere maalik	Kishore Kumar	Hindi	Half Ticket	Shailendra	Salil Chowdhury
1962	Arey le lo, ji le lo hai	Kishore Kumar	Hindi	Half Ticket	Shailendra	Salil Chowdhury
1954	Aarzi hamari	Kishore Kumar	Hindi	Naukri	Shailendra	Salil Chowdhury
1961	Aanshu samajhke kyun mujhe	Talat Mahmood	Hindi	Chhayaa	Rajinder Krishan	Salil Chowdhury
1955	Ab machal utha hain dariya	Chorus	Hindi	Non-Film 78 rpm record ( N76006)	Govind Munshi	Salil Chowdhury
1949	Abujh mon re bol more	Chorus	Bangla	Poribartan	Bimal Ghosh	Salil Chowdhury
1980	Alaiyendi Kollvom	S. P. Balasubramaniam, P. Susheela	Tamil	Doorathu Idi Muzhakkam	Ku. Ma. Balasubramaniam	Salil Chowdhury
1961	Ay dil kahan teri manjil	Dwijen Mukherjee & Lata Mangeshkar	Hindi	Maya	Majrooh	Salil Chowdhury
1961	Ay dil kahan teri manjil	Lata Mangeshkar	Hindi	Maya	Majrooh	Salil Chowdhury
1961	Ay mere pyaare watan	Manna Dey	Hindi	Kaabuliwaalaa	Prem Dhawan, Gulzaar	Salil Chowdhury
1946	Ay re o ay re	Chorus	Bangla	IPTA	Salil Chowdhury	Salil Chowdhury
1955	Ay re o paushali batase	Chorus	Bangla	Rikshawala	Salil Chowdhury	Salil Chowdhury
1995	Aaye naa aisaa waqt kisi pe	Kavita Krisnhamurthy	Hindi	Mera Damaad	Yogesh and Prem	Salil Chowdhury
1955	Baa.nki adaayei.n dekhnaa ji dekhnaa	Geeta Dutt	Hindi	Amaanat	Shailendra	Salil Chowdhury
1957	Baat koi matlab ki hai zaroor	Asha Vonsle	Hindi	Aparadhi Kaun	Majrooh	Bengali: Jay jay din - (1967) by Biswajit
1972	Baaje Go Beena	Manna Dey	Bangla	Marjina Abdulla	Salil Chowdhury	Salil Chowdhury
1969	Baaje jhanana jhanan	Biswajit	Bangla			Kannada: Kuniyutha jhanana jhana (1971) P. Susheela (Samasayaphala)
1982	Beeti dino ki sapne	Arundhati Home Chowdhury	Hindi	Non-Film	Yogesh	Hindi: Kayse manaao (1961) by Mukesh] Begali: Chanchal sonali pakhnay (1982) by Arundhati
1953	Bhaai re.. Dharti kahe pukar ke	Lata Manna Chorus	Hindi	Do Bigha Zameen (Story written by Salil Chowdhury "Rikshawala")	Shailendra	Salil Chowdhury
1944	Bhango bhango bhango bhango bhango kaaraa	Chorus	Bangla	IPTA	Salil Chowdhury	Salil Chowdhury
1947	Bichaarpoti tomaar bichaar korbey jaaraa	Chorus	Bangla	IPTA	Salil Chowdhury	Salil Chowdhury
1954	Bodhua lagiya basraso sajanu	–	Bangla	Aaj Sandhyay	–	Salil Chowdhury
1957	Bole pihu pihu pi papiharaa	Lata Mangeshkar	Hindi	Ek Gaaon Ki Kahaani	Shailendra	Salil Chowdhury
1956	Bone noy mone aaj ronger mela	Sandhya Mukhopadhyay	Bangla	Raat Bhore	Gouriprasanna Mazumdar	Salil Chowdhury
1954	Bristi pare tapur tupur	Hiralal Sarkhel	Bangla	IPTA	Bhaskar Bose	Salil Chowdhury
1958	Chadh Gayo Papi Bichhua	Lata Mangeshkar & Manna Dey	Hindi	Madhumati	Shailendra	Salil Chowdhury
1957	Chale thumak thumak taare	Lata Mangeskar	Hindi	Ek Gaaon Ki Kahaani	Shailendra	Bengali: Amaar kichhu moner aasha (1953) by Utpala Sen
1982	Chanchal sonali pakhnay	Arundhati Home Chowdhury	Bangla	Non-Film	–	Hindi: Kayse maano piyawa (1961) by Mukesh
1962	Chaa.nd raat, tum ho saath	Lata Mangeskar & Kishore Kumar	Hindi	Half Ticket	Shailendra	Salil Chowdhury
1955	Chet re moorakh..re moorakh tu kyaa	Asha & Manna Dey	Hindi	Amaanat	Shailendra	Salil Chowdhury
1955	Chhal chhal paani hamaari zindagaani	Asha & Manna Dey	Hindi	Amaanat	Shailendra	Salil Chowdhury
1961	Chham chham naachata aayee bahaar	Lata Mangeshkar	Hindi	Chhayaa	Rajinder Krishan	Salil Chowdhury
1954	Chhotasa ghar hoga	Kishorekumar & Shaila Belle	Hindi	Naukri	Shailendra	Salil Chowdhury
1982	Cholechhe aaj cholbey kaal shantir ei michhil	Calcutta coir	Bangla		Salil Chowdhury	Salil Chowdhury
1954	Chhotasa ghar hoga	Hemanta Mukherjee	Hindi	–	Shailendra	Salil Chowdhury
1957	Chuk chuk chhaiya chhaiya	Manna Dey, Chorus	Hindi	Lal Batti	Majrooh	Salil Chowdhury
1955	Dekho tangaa mera nirala	Md. Rafi	Hindi	Taangewaali	Prem Dhawan	Salil Chowdhury
1957	Desi kyaa bidesi, goraa bhi kitnaa	Shamshad Begum, Manna Dey	Hindi	Lal Batti	Majrooh	Salil Chowdhury
1946	Dheu uthchhey karaa tutchhey	Chorus	Bangla	IPTA	Salil Chowdhury	Salil Chowdhury
1954	Dil mera	Shamshad Begam	Hindi	Biraj Bahoo	Prem Dhawan	Bengali: Na jani re (1954) Gayatri Basu
1958	Dil Tadap Tadap Ke	Mukesh, Lata	Hindi	Madhumati	Shailendra	Tune influenced by a Hungarian folk song
1961	Dil se dil ki Dor baandhe	Lata, Mukesh	Hindi	Chhayaa	Rajinder Krishan	Salil Chowdhury
1954	Do matwale do dilwale	Samshad Begum, Chorus	Hindi	Manohar	V.M.Adil and J.S. Kashyap	Salil Chowdhury
1954	Dol gayee dharti	Md Rafi	Hindi	Biraj Bahoo	Prem Dhawan	Salil Chowdhury
1956	Dukher simaa naai	Satinath Mukherjee	Bangla	Raat Bhore	Gouriprasanna Mazumdar	Salil Chowdhury
1954	Duru duru duru guru guru guru [Aarzi hamari - Hindi - Kishore]	–	Bangla	Mohila Mahal	Salil Chowdhury	Salil Chowdhury
1956	E maajhi re	Shyamal Mitra	Bangla	Raat Bhore	Gouriprasanna Mazumdar	Salil Chowdhury
1960	Ebar Amar Somoy Holo	Madhuri Chattopadhyay	Bangla	Puja Album		Salil Chowdhury
1961	Ebar aami aamar theke	Sachin Gupta	Bangla			Salil Chowdhury
1956	Ei duniyay bhai sob i hoy	Manna Dey	Bangla	Ak Din Raatre	Salil Chowdhury	Salil Chowdhury
1995	Ei haansi ei gaan	Usha Utthup	Bangla			Hindi: Aankhon mein tum dil mein tum ho (1962) by Gita, Kishore in Half Ticket
1954	Ek chhotisi naukri ka talabgaar hoon	Kishore, Shyamal Mitra, Shankar Dasgupta	Hindi	Naukri	Shailendra	
1991	Ek dapha ki baat hai	Mahendra Kapoor	Hindi	Raat Ki Uljhan	Gulzar	Salil Chowdhury
1993	Eso aaj ei shubhodine onkikaar kori bondhu	Calcutta coir	Bangla	Doordarshan	Salil Chowdhury	Salil Chowdhury
1991	Eso nababarsha	Salil, Sabita, Antara	Bangla	Doordarshan	Salil Chowdhury	Salil Chowdhury
1961	Gangaa aaye kahaa.n se	Hemant Kumar	Hindi	Kaabuliwaalaa	Prem Dhawan, Gulzaar	Bengali: Uthaali paathaali amaar buuk (1960) Manna Dey in Ganga
1958	Ghadi Ghadi Mora Dil Dhadke	Lata Mangeshkar	Hindi	Madhumati	Shailendra	Bengali: Halud gandar phool; Sabita Chowdhury (1957)
1961	Gori babul ka	Lata, chorus	Hindi	Chaar Deewaari	Shailendra	Salil Chowdhury
1946	Gowrisringa tulechhe sheer	Chorus	Bangla	IPTA	Shailendra	Salil Chowdhury
1955	Ghoom Aay Re Aay	Pratima Bandyopadhyay	Bangla	Puja album	Mangala Charan Chattopadhyay	Salil Chowdhury
1979	Habuchandra Raja from "Chhotasa ghar hoga"	Antara Chowdhury	Bangla	–	–	Salil Chowdhury
1958	Hai Bichhua Hai Re Hai	Lata Mangeshkar	Hindi	Madhumati	Shailendra	
1957	Hain pyaar ke do matwaale	Geeta Dutt, Manna Dey	Hindi	Aparadhi Kaun	Majrooh Sultanpuri	
1957	Hay jhilmil jhilmil ye shaam ke saaye [Shyamameghame - Malayalam (1977) K.J.Yesudas ]	Lata Mangeshkar	Hindi	Lal Batti	Majrooh Sultanpuri	
1957	Hay koi dekh lega	Lata Mangeskar, Talat Mahmood	Hindi	Ek Gaaon Ki Kahaani	Shailendra	
1957	Halud gandar phool	Sabita Chowdhury	Bangla	-	Salil Chowdhury	Hindi: GhaDi ghaDi meraa dil dhaDke; Movie: Madhumati (1958) Lata Mangeskar
1957	Halke halke chalo saa.nware [Unaru Unaru (Malayalam) Movie- Air Hostess (1980) K.J.Yesudas, Vani Jairam]	Lata Mangeskar, Hemant Mukherjee	Hindi	Taangewaali	Prem Dhawan	Salil Chowdhury
1953	Hariyaala sawaan dhol bajaata aaya	Lata Manna Chorus	Hindi	Do Bigha Zameen (Story written by Salil Chowdhury "Rikshawala")	Shailendra	Bengali: Uru taka taka taghina taghina (1944)
1948	Hei samaalo dhaan ho, kasteyta dao shaan ho	Chorus	Bangla	IPTA	Salil Chowdhury	Salil Chowdhury
1961	Ho ya qurbaan.. o sabaa kehnaa mere dildaar ko	Mohammed Rafi	Hindi	Kaabuliwaalaa	Prem Dhawan, Gulzaar	Salil Chowdhury
1957	Holi Hain....	Lata Mangskar, Manna Dey	Hindi	Ek Gaaon Ki Kahaani	Shailendra	Bengali: O kanai paar karo amare - by Nirmalendu Choudhury
1958	Hum Haal-e-Dil Sunaenge	Mubarak Begum	Hindi	Madhumati	Shailendra	Salil Chowdhury
1961	Hum to ghar mein choolha phoonke	Lata, Mahendra Kapoor, chorus	Hindi	Memdidi	Shailendra	
1961	Humko samajh baiThi hai, ye duniyaa	Mukesh	Hindi	Chaar Deewaari	Shailendra	Bengali: Ei duniyay bhai sob i hoy (1956) Manna dey (Ek Din Raatre)
1991	In bahaaron ki kasam	Hemant Kumar, Krishna Kalle	Hindi	Raat Ki Uljhan	Gulzar	Salil Chowdhury
1980	Indro Manam kalangi	K. J. Yesudas	Tamil	Doorathu Idi Muzhakkam	Ku. Ma. Balasubramaniam	Salil Chowdhury
1954	Iskaboner deshe	Bani Ghoshal	Bangla		-	Salil Chowdhury
1961	Itnaa na mujhse tu pyaar baDhaa	Lata Mangeshkar, Talat Mahmood	Hindi	Chhayaa	Rajinder Krishan	Inspired by Mozart's Symphony number 40 in G minor
1995	Itharo chembaruntho	-	Malayalam	Thumboli Kadappuram	-	Hindi: Machalti Aarzoo from Usne Kaha Tha (1960)
1959	Jaa re ure jare pakhi	Lata Mangeshkar	Bangla	Puja Album	Salil Chowdhury	Salil Chowdhury
1961	Jaa re ur jare panchhi	Lata Mangeshkar	Hindi	Maya	Majrooh	Salil Chowdhury
1995	jab main bhaiyaa sharaab hun peeta	Jolly Mukherjee	Hindi	Mera Damaad	Yogesh and Prem	Salil Chowdhury
1956	Jaago mohan pritam	Lata Mangeshkar	Hindi	Ak Din Raatre	Salil Chowdhury	
1955	Jab tumne mohabaat chheen lee	Asha Bhonsle	Hindi	Amaanat	Shailendra	Salil Chowdhury
1961	Jaani na jaani na kon	Sachin Giupta	Bangla			Salil Chowdhury
1969	Jaay jaay din	Biswajit	Bangla			Hindi: baat koi matlab ki hai zaroor (1957) Asha (Aparadhi Kaun)
1995	Jhir jhir barse aaj gagan se	Anuradha Paudwal, Sabita Chowdhury, Amit Kumar and Shailendra Singh	Hindi	Mera Damaad	Yogesh and Prem	Hindi, Bengali (O phuler dal sung by Usha Mangeskar), Malayalam, Tamil, Telugu
1952	Jhir jhir jhir jhir jhiri barosa	Dhananjay Bhattacharya	Bangla	Pasher Bari	Salil Chowdhury	Salil Chowdhury
1967	Jhir jhir jhir jhir jhare	Biswajit	Bangla			Salil Chowdhury
1967	Jhor jhor more	Biswajit	Bangla			Salil Chowdhury
1954	Jhoom re	Geeta Dutta	Hindi	Naukri	Shailendra	Salil Chowdhury
1957	jhoome re neela ambar jhoome	Talat Mahmood	Hindi	Ek Gaaon Ki Kahaani	Shailendra	
1961	Jhuk jhuk jhuk jhoom ghaTaa aayee re	Lata	Hindi	Chaar Deewaari	Shailendra	Salil Chowdhury
1968	Jhunjhun moinaa naacho na	Mukesh	Bangla			Salil Chowdhury
1954	Jibano mono charane tomar	Gayatri Basu	Bangla	Aaj Sandhyay	Salil Chowdhury	Salil Chowdhury
1962	Jodi jaante, O tumi jaante	Manobendra Mukhopadhyay	Bangla	-	-	Salil Chowdhury
1982	Juddha keno hoy	Calcutta coir	Bangla	-	Salil Chowdhury	Salil Chowdhury
1958	Jungle Mein Mor Naacha	Md Rafi	Hindi	Madhumati	Shailendra	Salil Chowdhury
1961	Kaabuliwaalaa.. nanhi munni kyo.n kumhalaaya	Hemant, Usha, Sabita Chowdhury, Ranu Mukherj	Hindi	Kaabuliwaalaa	Prem Dhawan, Gulzaar	Salil Chowdhury
1958	Kaancha Le Kanchi Lai Lajo	Asha Bhonsle, Sabita Chowdhury & Ghulam Mohammad	Hindi	Madhumati	Shailendra	Salil Chowdhury
1957	Kaanha khubDa langDa loolaa, buDDhaa	Asha Bhonsle	Hindi	Ek Gaaon Ki Kahaani	Shailendra	Salil Chowdhury
1944	Kaaraar duaar bhaango bhaango oikker bajra kothin hathey	Chorus	Bangla	IPTA	Salil Chowdhury	Salil Chowdhury
1995	Kaathil Thenmazhayaay	K.J Yesudas	Malayalam	Thumboli Kadappuram	O.N.V Kurupp	Salil Chowdhury
1964	Kashmir Punjab Hind Rajasthan	Hemant Mukherjee	Hindi	-	Salil Chowdhury	Abhijit Banerjee
1961	Kayse maano piyawaa	Mukesh	Hindi	Chaar Deewaari	Shailendra	Salil Chowdhury
1953	Ke jaabi ay	Geeta Mukherjee	Bangla	Bhor Hoye Elo		Salil Chowdhury
1963	Ki aar kohibo balo	Madhuri Chattopadhyay	Bangla	Puja album	Salil Chowdhury	Salil Chowdhury
1961	Ki je kori, durey jetey hoi taai	Lata Mangeshkar	Bangla	-		Hindi:Aanshu samajhke kyun mujhe (1961) Talat Mahmood
1952	Klaanti naame go	Dwijen Mukherjee	Bangla	-	-	Salil Chowdhury
1957	Koi dekhe to kahey tujhko	Asha Vonsle	Hindi	Aparadhi Kaun	Majrooh	Salil Chowdhury
1991	Koi pukaare kahise	Krishna Kalle	Hindi	Raat Ki Uljhan	Gulzar	Bengali: Jibone jaa kichhu chhilo (1967) Sandhya Mukherjee
1961	Koi sone ki dil wala	Md Rafi	Hindi	Maya	Majrooh Sultanpuri	Salil Chowdhury
1957	Kyaa se kyaa ho gayaa re	Nirmalendu Chowdhury, Chorus	Hindi	Lal Batti	Majrooh Sultanpuri	Salil Chowdhury
1956	Lo se wai wai	Sandhya Mukherjee and others	Hindi	Ak Din Raatre	Shailendra	Salil ChowdhurySalil Chowdhury
1954	Maajhi re chal naiya, raam karega paar	Nirmalendu Chowdhury	Hindi	Biraj Bahoo	Prem Dhawan	Salil Chowdhury
1960	Machalti aarjoo [ Itharo chembaruntho from Thumboli Kadappuram (Malayalam, 1995)]	-	Hindi	Usne Kaha Tha	-	Salil Chowdhury
1954	Maharaja jaago ji	Asha Bhonsle & Chorus	Hindi	Manohar	V.M.Adil and J.S. Kashyap	Salil Chowdhury
1955	Main lut gayee duniyaa waalon	Lata Mangeskar	Hindi	Taangewaali	Prem Dhawan	Salil Chowdhury
1966	Manzil teri khoj mein	Lata Mangeskar	Hindi	Pinjre Ki Panchhi	Shailendra	Bengali: O aamaar joto saadh (1979) Arati Mukherjee (Srikaanter Will); Gun gun phaagun shesh holey (1967) Madhuri Chattopadhyay
1954	Meghe meghe rim jhim	Alpana Banerjee	Bangla	Aaj Sandhyay	Anil Chatterjee	Salil Chowdhury
1957	Mera dil dil dil dil dil laa...	Asha Vonsle	Hindi	Aparadhi Kaun	Majrooh	Salil Chowdhury
1954	Mere man bhula bhula kahe dole	Hemanta Mukherjee	Hindi	Biraj Bahoo	Prem Dhawan	Salil Chowdhury
1955	Meri wafaaei.n tumhaari jafaaei.n	Asha Bhonsle	Hindi	Amaanat	Shailendra	Salil Chowdhury
1968	Mon maataal saanjh sakaal	Mukesh	Bangla			Hindi: Shaam se (1968) Mukesh (Mitti ka Dev); Malayalam: Yaathrayay (1991) Unni Menon; Bengali: Ei pather sesh kothaay (1983) Gautam Dasgupta
1980	Mone pore sei sob din	Kishore Kumar	Bangla	Antarghaat; Released as Swarnatrishaa in 1990	Salil Chowdhury	Hindi: Man kare yaad wo din by Kishore Kumar in Aakhiri Badlaa (1989); Malayalam: Parannupoy nee by Jesudas in Chuvanna Chirakkukal (1979)
1975	Na jaane kyun	Lata Mangeskar	Hindi	Chaand Aur Sooraj	Shailendra	Bengali: Pagol Hawa
1954	Na jani re	Gayatri Basu	Bangla	Aaj Sandhyay	Salil Chowdhury	Hindi: Dil mera by Shamshad Begam in Biraj Bahu (1954)
1959	Na jeo na	Lata Mangeshkar	Bangla	Puja Album	Salil Chowdhury	Salil Chowdhury
1955	Nao gaan bhorey	Pratima Bandopadhyay	Bangla	Puja Album		Salil Chowdhury
1959	Naach re dharti ke pyaare	–	Hindi	Heera Moti	Shailendra	Bengali: Aay re o pousaali bataasey
1961	Nind pari lori gaayi	Lata Mangeshkar	Hindi	Chaar Deewaari	Shailendra	Bengali: Prantorer gaan by Utpala Sen, (1953)
1960	Nijere Haraye KhNuji	Madhuri Chattopadhyay	Bangla	Puja Album		Salil Chowdhury
1948	Nondito nondito desh aamaar	Geeta Mukherjee & Salil Chowdhury	Bangla	IPTA	Salil Chowdhury	Salil Chowdhury
1947	Nobaaruno raage raange re	Chorus	Bangla	IPTA	Salil Chowdhury	Salil Chowdhury
1955	Nao Gaan Bhore Naoy	Pratima Bandyopadhyay	Bangla	Puja album	Salil Chowdhury	Salil Chowdhury
1979	O amaar joto saadh	Arati Mukherjee	Bangla	Srikaanter Will	Salil Chowdhury	Bengali: Gun gun phaagun shesh holey by Madhuri Chattopadhyay (1967); Hindi: Manzil teri khoj mein (1966) Lata (Pinjre Ki Panchhi)
1959	O banshi hay	Lata Mangeshkar	Bangla	Puja Album	Salil Chowdhury	Salil Chowdhury
1955	O jab se milee.n to se ankhiyaa.n	Geeta Dutt & Hemant Mukherjee	Hindi	Amaanat	Shailendra	Bengali: Dola o dola
1995	O maajhi bhaiyo	Usha Utthup	Bangla	-	-	Salil Chowdhury
1954	O man re	Lata Mangeshkar	Hindi	Naukri	Shailendra	Salil Chowdhury
1960	O sajna barkha bahar ayi	Lata Mangeshkar	Hindi	Parakh	Shailendra	Salil Chowdhury
1967	Oi je sobuj bono beethika	Madhuri Chattopadhaay	Bangla	Puja Album	Salil Chowdhury	Hindi: Ek dapha ki baat hai (19??) Mahendra Kapoor (Raat Ki Uljhan) Lyrics Gulzar
1954	Om namo namo	Hemanta Mukherjee	Hindi	Biraj Bahoo	Prem Dhawan	Salil Chowdhury
1980	Onnam kunnin from "Chhotasa ghar hoga"	K.J.Yesudas	Malayalam	Air Hostess	ONV Kurup	Salil Chowdhury
1960	Ogo ar kichu to nai	Lata Mangeshkar	Bangla	Puja Album	Salil Chowdhury	Salil Chowdhury
1962	Pagol hawa	Jatileshwar Mukhopadhyay	Bangla		Salil Chowdhury	Hindi: Na jaane kiyun by Lata in ChhoTi si Baat (1975)
1958	Path Harabo Bolei Ebar	Hemanta Mukherjee	Bangla		Salil Chowdhury	Also recorded by KJ Yesudas in 1985
1954	Patthar se badle huye	–	Hindi	Mohila Mahal	Salil Chowdhury	Salil Chowdhury
1961	Phir ekbar kaho	Dwijen Mukherjee & Lata Mangeshkar	Hindi	Maya	Majrooh	Salil Chowdhury
1957	Phir wohi dard hai phir wohi jigar	Manna Dey	Hindi	Aparadhi Kaun	Majrooh	Salil Chowdhury
1953	Prantorer gaan	Utpala Sen	Bangla	-		Hindi: Neend pari lori gaaye (1961) Lata Mangeskar (Chaardeewaari)
1977	Ponnushassin	P. Jayachandran	Malayalam	Vishukkani	SreeKumaran Thampi	Hindi: Jhuk jhuk jhuk - (1961) by Lata Mangeskar; Bengali: Monobinaay akhoni boojhi by Sabita (1962)
1951	Puntimachh dangay uithya foot katey	Tarja Gaan	Bangla	Barjatri	Gurudas Pal	Salil Chowdhury
1965	Puthan valakkaare	Manna Dey	Malayalam	Chemmeen	Vayalar	Salil Chowdhury
1957	Raat ne kyaa kyaa khwaab dikhaaye	Talat Mahmood	Hindi	Ek Gaaon Ki Kahaani	Shailendra	Salil Chowdhury
1956	Rim jhim jhim	Sandhya Mukhopadhyay	Bangla	Raat Bhore	Gouriprasanna Mazumdar	Salil Chowdhury
1955	Rimjhim jhim jhim badarvaa barse	Lata Mangeskar	Hindi	Taangewaali	Prem Dhawan	Bengali: Jhir jhir jhir jhiir jhiri barosa by Dhananjoy Bhattyacharya in the movie Pasher Bari (1952); Malayalam: Jil jil jil by Jayachandran, P.Susheela in the movie- Puthiya Velicham (1979)
1951	Roop nagarer pothik ogo	Supriti Ghosh	Bangla	Barjatri	Bimal Ghosh	Salil Chowdhury
1961	Sanam tu chal	Md Rafi	Hindi	Maya	Majrooh	Salil Chowdhury
1956	Se gaan ami jai je bhule	Sandhya Mukherjee	Bangla	Ak Din Raatre	Salil Chowdhury	Salil Chowdhury
1985	Sedin aar kato dure	Calcutta coir	Bangla	-	Salil Chowdhury	Salil Chowdhury
1980	Sevvali Poove	P. Susheela	Tamil	Doorathu Idi Muzhakkam	Ku. Ma. Balasubramaniam	Salil Chowdhury
1954	Shyam re	Hemanta Mukherjee	Hindi	Biraj Bahoo	Prem Dhawan	Salil Chowdhury
1952	Shyamal baroni ogo kanya	Dwijen Mukherjee	Bangla	-	-	Hindi: Aankhon mein masti sharaab ki - (1961) Talat Mahmood (Chhaya)
1951	Shimul shimul shimulti	Bharati Basu	Bangla	Barjatri	Salil Chowdhury	Salil Chowdhury
1977	Shuno Shuno Go Sabe	Kishore Kumar	Bangla	Kabita	Salil Chowdhury	Salil Chowdhury
1955	Siaram Siaram (Hindi)	Dhananjay Bhattacharya and Chorus	Bangla	Rikshawala	Govind Munshi	Salil Chowdhury
1958	Suhana Safar Aur Yeh Mausam	Mukesh	Hindi	Madhumati	Shailendra	Salil Chowdhury
1964	Swadesh aamar swapno aamar	Dwijen Mukherjee	Bangla	-	Salil Chowdhury	Abhijit Banerjee
1954	Taare udaas	Gayatri Basu	Hindi	Aaj Sandhyay	Prem Dhawan	Salil Chowdhury
1958	Tan Jale Man Jalta Rahe	Dwijen Mukherjee	Hindi	Madhumati	Shailendra	Salil Chowdhury
1961	Tasbeer teri dil me	Lata Mangeshkar & Md. Rafi	Hindi	Maya	Majrooh Sultanpuri	-
1954	Teler shishi bhaanglo boley	Bani Ghoshal	Hindi	Biraj Bahoo	Annada Shankar Roy	-
1954	Tera ghar aabad rahe	Lata Mangeshkar & Shyamal Mitra	Hindi	Biraj Bahoo	Prem Dhawan	Salil Chowdhury
1955	Tere nayno ne	Lata Mangeshkar and Md. Rafi	Hindi	Taangewaali	Prem Dhawan	Salil Chowdhury
1954	Tomra kebal moner sukhe	–	Bangla	Mohila Mahal	Salil Chowdhury	Salil Chowdhury
1958	Toote Huye Khwabon Ne	Md. Rafi	Hindi	Madhumati	Shailendra	Salil Chowdhury
1954	Tore tokka tokka tore	–	Bangla	Mohila Mahal	Salil Chowdhury	Salil Chowdhury
1965	Tumhe Dil Se Chaha	Suman Kalyanpur and Mohammed Rafi	Hindi	Chand Aur Suraj	Shailendra	Salil Chowdhury
1953	Ujjwal Ek Jhank Paayra	Sandhya Mukherjee	Bangla	-	Bimal Chandra Ghosh	
1980	Ullam Ellam Thalladuthe	K. J. Yesudas & S. Janaki	Tamil	Doorathu Idi Muzhakkam	Ku. Ma. Balasubramaniam	Salil Chowdhury
1944	Uru taka taka taghina taghina	Chorus	Bangla	IPTA	Salil Chowdhury	Hindi: Hariyaali sawaan dhol bajaata aaya in Do Bigha Zameen (1953)
1960	Uthaali paathaali amaar buuk	Manna Dey	Bangla	Ganga	Salil Chowdhury	Salil Chowdhury
1962	Wo ek nighaah kya milee	Lata Mangsekkar & Kishore Kumar	Hindi	Half Ticket	Shailendra	Salil Chowdhury
1960	Ye banshi kiun gay	Lata Mangeshkar	Hindi	Parakh	Shailendra	Salil Chowdhury
1961	Ye kahde hum insaan nahi	Md. Rafi	Hindi	Chhayaa	Rajinder Krishan	Salil Chowdhury
1961	Zadu daale hai	Asha Bhosle & Chorus	Hindi	Maya	Majrooh	Salil Chowdhury
1961	Zindegi hai kya	Md Rafi	Hindi	Maya	Majrooh	Salil Chowdhury
1958	Zulmi Sang Aankh Ladi	Lata Mangeshkar	Hindi	Madhumati	Shailendra	Salil Chowdhury

IPTA: Indian People's Theater Association

== Awards and recognitions ==
1953 – Do Bigha Zamin

A Hindi film directed by Bimal Roy based on a story in Bengali "Rikshawalaa" written by Salil Chowdhury.

1st Filmfare Awards (1954) Winner – Best Film; Winner – Best Director – Bimal Roy;

1st National Film Awards (India) Winner – All India Certificate of Merit for Best Feature Film

7th Cannes Film Festival (1954) Winner – Prix International (International Prize) Nominated – Grand Prize (Best Film)

Karlovy Vary International Film Festival Winner – Prize for Social Progress

1965 – Chemmeen

A Malayalam film directed by Ramu Kariat, based on a novel of the same name written by the renowned writer Thakazhy Shivshankar Pillai, where Music Direction was done by Salil Chowdhury.

Recipient of president's gold medal in 1965.

1958 – Madhumati

Received Filmfare Best Music Director Award along with eight other Filmfare awards Madhumati won the National Film Awards for Best Feature Film in Hindi

The Uttar Pradesh Film Patrakar Sangh Puraskar in 1966 for his only Hindi directorial film 'Pinjre Ke Panchhi'

The Bengal Films Journalist Award, Kolkata in 1973

The Allauddin Smriti Puraskar in 1985 from the Govt of West Bengal

1988 – Salil Chowdhury received Sangeet Natak Akademi Award

The Maharashtra Gaurav Puraskar Award in 1990

Posthumously he was awarded the Mukti Judhho Maitreyi Samman Award by the Govt Bangladesh in 2012.

Poet, Playwright, Short story writer, he also directed a film Pinjre Ke Panchhi starring Meena Kumari, Balraj Sahani and Mehmood b

The 56th International Film Festival of India taking place from 20 to 28 November 2025, will celebrate centenary and pay tribute to Salil Chowdhury by screening his classic films.
