= Thumboli Kadappuram =

- VCD Cover
- Directed by: Jayaraj
- Written by: Unni Joseph
- Screenplay by: Kaloor Dennis
- Starring: Manoj K. Jayan; Priya Raman; Vijayaraghavan; Silk Smitha
- Music by: Salil Chowdhury
- Release date: 1995
- Country: India
- Language: Malayalam

Thumboli Kadappuram is a 1995 Indian Malayalam film, written by Unni Joseph, directed by Jayaraj, starring Manoj K. Jayan and Priya Raman in the lead roles.

== Plot ==
Methrinju is a local ruffian at the village Thumboli Kadappuram who doesn't care for anyone. Philippose is a rich guy in the area whose fishing boats are blocked by the local fishermen of Thumpoly Kadappuram under Methrinju. He sends goons to rough up the fishermen, but they are driven away by Methrinju. Clara is in love with Methrinju and wants to marry him. Williams is another fisherman in the village who is often at loggerheads with Methrinju over trivial issues. He sees Mary during a fair at a local church festival, falls in love with her, and is beaten up by her brothers who are sons of Solomon, another rich businessman from the area. Williams eventually elopes with Mary and comes back to Thumboli Kadappuram but is threatened by the hostile villagers against staying there since they will have to face repercussions from the influential Solomon and his sons. However, Methrinju stands up to them and offers to help Williams which leads to them becoming thick friends. Clara advises Methrinju to turn over a good leaf and lead a family life with her, upon which he visits the church, makes amends with the priest, and confesses his sins. On his return, he learns of Solomon's sons attacking Williams and trying to take away Mary. He helps William beat them up and drives them away.

When Philippose turns up in the area during the annual fish thronging season (Chaakara) to do business, he is turned away by Williams and Methrinju because of their earlier issues. Philippose who is on the lookout to break away their resistance seeks the help of Paashanam. He plots to create a split between Methrinju and Williams and starts to spread a rumor in the village that Methrinju is having an affair with Mary behind Williams's back and is cheating on Clara, whom he had agreed to marry eventually. Clara believes the rumor and has an argument with Methrinju which ends up in him slapping her. The next day, Clara's corpse washes up on the shore and everyone deduces that she commits suicide not being able to bear what had happened. Methrinju gets depressed and plans to leave the village for good since no one believes him. Paashanam overhears Philippose one day plotting to kill Paashanam himself since he is aware of the tactics played by Philippose on the villagers fearing that he might spill the beans someday. A frightened Paashanam runs to the village and reveals to Williams and Methrinju that Clara had not committed suicide and was in fact killed by Philippose’ s wayward son when he tried to molest her. Philippose and Solomons sons comes behind him to the village where they have a fight with Williams and Methrinju and are eventually beaten up by the villagers who learn the truth. Methrinju kills Philippose’ s son and is arrested.

== Cast ==
- Manoj K. Jayan as Williams
- Priya Raman as Mary
- Vijayaraghavan as Methrinju
- Silk Smitha as Clara
- Rajan P. Dev as Solomon
- Indrans as Pushpangathan
- Kuthiravattam Pappu as Gee Varghese
- Kunjandi as Vareed
- Kozhikode Narayanan Nair as Priest
- Jose Prakash as Antony
- A. C. Zainuddin
- Adoor Bhavani
- Adoor Pankajam as Kakkamma
- Eliyas Babu as Philippose
- Jose Pellissery as Valappad Velayudhan
- Kaduvakulam Antony
- Augustine as Pashanam
- Santhosh
- Spadikam George as Rhomichayan
- Philomina as Chanchamma
- Sonia Baiju Kottarakkara as Kochu Thresia
- Rani Laurius
- Thodupuzha Vasanthy
- Prem Kumar as Chalappan
- K. R. Vatsala
- Ragini
- Baburaj
- Kozhikode Sarada

== Soundtrack ==
The film's soundtrack contains 5 songs, all composed by Salil Chowdhary, with lyrics by O. N. V. Kurup.

#	Title	Singer(s)
1	"Kaathil Thenmazhayaay" (M)	K. J. Yesudas
2	"Kaathil Thenmazhayaay" (F)	K. S. Chitra
3	"Ithaaro Chemparuntho"	K. J. Yesudas, Chorus
4	"Olangale Odangale"	K. S. Chitra, Chorus
5	"Varavelkkayaay"	K. J. Yesudas
