= Samayamaayilla Polum =

- Directed by: U.P Tomy
- Written by: Parrapuram Mathai
- Produced by: Ajantha Films
- Starring: Chinni Prakash; Urmila; Ambika; K. P. Ummer
- Music by: Salil Chowdhary
- Production company: Marina Films
- Distributed by: Marina Films
- Release date: 12 August 1978
- Country: India
- Language: Malayalam

Samayamaayilla Polum is a 1978 Indian Malayalam film, produced by Brian Joseph. The film stars Chinni Prakash, Urmila, Ambika and K. P. Ummer in the lead roles. The film has musical score and songs composed by Salil Chowdhary.

== Cast ==
- Chinni Prakash as Rajan
- Urmila as Lakshmi
- Ambika as Latha
- K. P. Ummer as Krishnadas
- Mala Aravindan as KK Kanichukulangara
- Kaviyoor Ponnamma as Savithri
- Mallika Sukumaran as Mayavathi
- Kuthiravattam Pappu as Edakoodam Chanchalakshan
- Veeran as Chandikunju
- Thrissur Elsy as Meenakshi/Rajan's mother

== Soundtrack ==
The music was composed by Salil Chowdhary and the lyrics were written by O. N. V. Kurup.

No.	Song	Singers	Lyrics	Length (m:ss)
1	"Devi Devi"	K. J. Yesudas	O. N. V. Kurup	
2	"Mayilukalaadum"	K. J. Yesudas, Sabitha Chowdhary	O. N. V. Kurup	
3	"Onnaamthumbi Nee"	P. Susheela	O. N. V. Kurup	
4	"Shyaama Meghame"	K. J. Yesudas	O. N. V. Kurup	
