= Asif Noorani =

Newspaper journalist

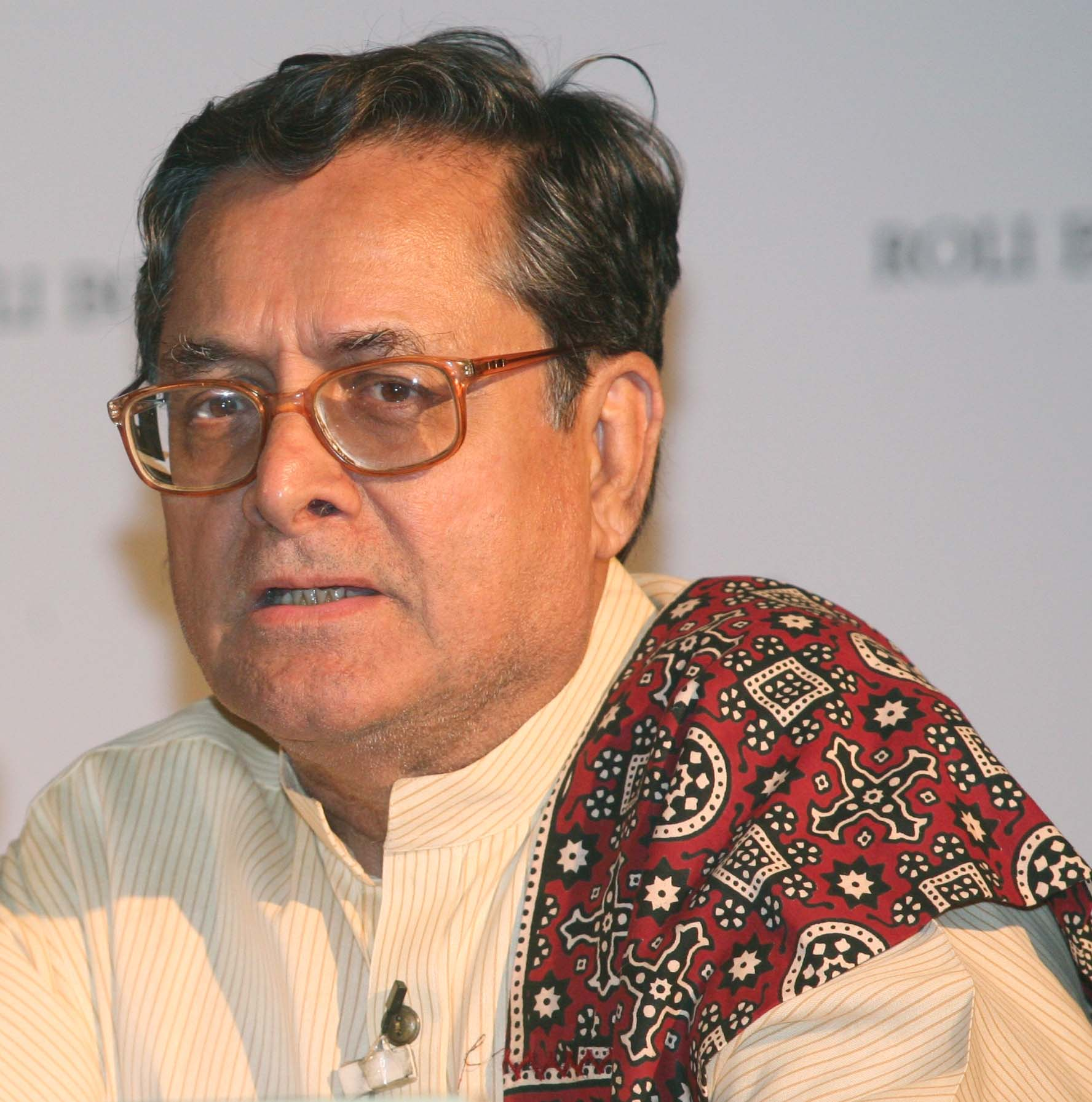
- Asif Noorani pictured in 2008
- Born: 1942 (age 83–84); Mumbai, India
- Occupations: Journalist, Writer, Music critic
- Known for: Promoting friendship and cultural relationship between India and Pakistan

Asif Noorani (Urdu: آصف نورانی; born 1942) is a Pakistani newspaper and television journalist and writer.

== Personal life ==
Asif Noorani was born in Bombay, British India, in 1942. He belongs to a secular Urdu-speaking family. His family migrated to Pakistan from Bombay in 1950. He obtained his Masters in English Literature in 1965 from the University of Karachi. Two years earlier, he joined the magazine, Eastern Film as Assistant Editor and rose to the position of Editor in merely one year. Noorani was married to Ajmal Noorani an English Language and Literature teacher who has taught for decades and is currently teaching English Final O'level students at Reflections.

== Career ==
Asif Noorani contributes to leading Pakistani, and occasionally Indian publications, articles on art, literature and music. He reviews books and music recordings. He is particularly known for his humorous writings and travelogues. He also appears on television and radio programs. He writes both in English and Urdu.

He works with the Dawn Group of Newspapers as a consultant. He has written a book titled Tales of Two Cities with the noted Indian journalist Kuldip Nayar, whose family migrated from Sialkot to Delhi, while Asif Noorani, who was only five at the time of Partition writes about his family's migration from Mumbai to Karachi, Pakistan, in 1950 when he was only eight.

The ensuing communal riots and the migration of millions of people in the aftermath of independence of Pakistan and The partition of india affected him deeply. At the same time, this independence brought with it great hope for both India and Pakistan as well. The communal riots and the resulting events he witnessed as a young child helped change his thinking later as he was growing up. In addition, the writings of progressive writers like Krishan Chander, Rajendra Singh Bedi, Khwaja Ahmad Abbas and Ismat Chughtai made his outlook completely secular.

An ardent crusader of the need for close contacts between Pakistanis and Indians, as also warm cultural relationship between their two countries, Asif Noorani has spoken on the subject at various forums in Boston, New Delhi and Karachi. These subjects have been a recurring theme in his writings, too.

As a music critic, Asif Noorani has a long-held view that music transcends all geographical, cultural barriers worldwide and specifically among people of Pakistan and North India.

== Books ==
- His labour of love, a book on Mehdi Hassan, with two CDs, one of rare renditions of ghazals, and the other a medley of folk, film and semi-classical numbers.
- His second book, on the flamboyant Pakistani cricketer Shahid Afridi, is titled 'Boom Boom Shahid Afridi'.
- In 2012, he rewrote and updated his book Journey Through Pakistan.
