= Qila (film) =

- Original poster
- Directed by: Umesh Mehra
- Written by: Humayun Mirza; Umesh Mehra
- Produced by: Parvesh Mehra
- Starring: Dilip Kumar; Rekha
- Cinematography: S. Pappu
- Edited by: Kamal Sehgal
- Music by: Anand Raaj Anand (songs); Raju Singh (score)
- Production company: Eagle Films
- Distributed by: Eagle Films
- Release date: 1998
- Country: India
- Language: Hindi

Qila (translation: Fort) is a 1998 Indian Hindi-language mystery drama thriller directed by Umesh Mehra and starring Dilip Kumar (in a Dual Role), Rekha, Mukul Dev, Mamta Kulkarni, Smita Jaykar and Gulshan Grover.

The film marked the final film appearance of Dilip Kumar before his death on 7 July 2021.

The film is a mystery thriller in which Kumar plays dual roles as an evil landowner who is murdered and as his twin brother who is a court judge tasked with investigating who killed him.

== Plot ==
A cruel and evil landowner Jagannath Singh is murdered and his twin brother Amarnath Singh decides to investigate. He finds the list of suspects is endless. The prime suspects are Jagannath's son Amar, Jagannath's abused wife Suman and a woman named Yamini who claims she was raped by Jagannath. Eventually, Jagannath's son Amar confesses to killing his father. He reveals that on the night of his father's death he accidentally shot him while trying to fight him off when Jagannath held Amar and his mother at gunpoint. Soon after the list of suspects grow, it is discovered that Jagannath's had many more enemies who could have killed him, including landowner Mangal Singh and even Jagannath's brother Amarnath, who doesn't seem to have got on well with Jagannath himself in the past. Yamini killed Jagannath for his wrongdoings to her brother.

== Cast ==
- Dilip Kumar as Thakur Jagannath Singh / Judge Amarnath Singh (Dual Role)
- Rekha as Yamini
- Mukul Dev as Amar Singh
- Mamta Kulkarni as Neeta
- Smita Jaykar as Suman Singh
- Satish Kaushik as Ghanya Seth
- Gulshan Grover as Mangal Singh
- Pramod Moutho as Prosecuting Attorney
- Rajeshwari Sachdev as Laajo
- Malay Chakrabarty as Kundan
- Avtar Gill as Inspector Khan
- Shahbaz Khan as Inspector Rana
- Kunickaa Sadanand as Neelam
- Dr Sahil Chheda as Child Artist Raja

== Music ==
Qila

Soundtrack album by Anand Raaj Anand
- Released: 4 February 1998
- Genre: Feature film soundtrack
- Label: Sony Music India

All songs are composed by Anand Raaj Anand with lyrics by Dev Kohli.

No.	Title	Singer(s)	Length
1.	"Layi Hai Mehndi Wali Raat"	Mohammed Aziz, Nayan Rathod, Sadhana Sargam, Preeti Singh	04:17
2.	"Prem Hai Radha Prem Hai Meera"	Sadhana Sargam	05:39
3.	"Wah Bhai Wah"	Udit Narayan, Poornima	05:24
4.	"Ankhiyan Yeh Ankhiyan"	Asha Bhosle, Udit Narayan	05:29
5.	"Kurte Ki Banhiya"	Amit Kumar, Udit Narayan, Preeti Singh	05:03
6.	"Tere Bin O Dilbar"	Alka Yagnik	05:25
Total length:			31:17

== Reception ==
India Today wrote, "Qila, the story of a good twin and a bad twin, is more than just outdated, it's prehistoric. Dilip Kumar's long-drawn-out dialogue delivery is out of sync with the times. Only the still-lovely Rekha survives this mess." Screen wrote, "Director Umesh Mehra fails to retain audience interest. It’s a pity that he couldn’t utilise two of the most talented artistes of the country and exploit their potential to the fullest, instead of making them act in a hotch-potch of a movie".
