= Paari (1966 film) =

1966 Bengali film directed by Jagannath Chattopadhyaya

- Directed by: Jagganath Chatterjee
- Written by: Jarasandha
- Produced by: Pronoti Ghosh
- Starring: Dharmendra; Dilip Kumar; Abhi Bhattacharya
- Music by: Salil Chowdhury
- Release date: 1966
- Country: India
- Language: Bengali

Paari (Bengali: পাড়ি) is a 1966 Bengali film directed by Jagganath Chatterjee, based on a story by Jarasandha. It stars Dharmendra in his first Bengali film and Pronoti Ghosh, with Dilip Kumar in a guest appearance as a jailor in Andaman and was successful. It was later remade in 1972 by the same director in Hindi as Anokha Milan with the lead actors reprising their roles. This was the first movie in which Dilip Kumar and Dharmendra appeared together.

== Cast ==
- Dharmendra
- Pronoti Ghosh
- Abhi Bhattacharya
- Dilip Roy
- Keshto Mukherjee
- Dilip Kumar (Guest Appearance)

== Soundtrack ==
The soundtrack of Paari consists of three songs with music composed and lyrics written by Salil Chowdhury. The last song "tora sundor saami paabi" (you all will get handsome husbands) is a Bengali pre-marriage folk song and was given to Salil by Nirmalaendu Chowdhury (a famous Bengali folk singer). Salil Chowdhury changed a few words of the lyrics as required by the film.

Song	Singer	Lyrics
"Bondhu re"	Hemanta Mukherjee	Salil Chowdhury
"Bokul boner katha"	Asha Bhonsle	Salil Chowdhury
"Toraa sundor saami paabi"	Sabita Chowdhury and chorus	Bengali folk song

The three songs were later reused in Hindi version, Anokha Milan, with Hindi lyrics for the first two songs, while the folk song "Toraa sundor saami paabi" remained the same. The tune of "Bokul boner katha" was also used in a 1975 Malayalam film Raagam, with music by Salil Chowdhury, in the song "Naadanpaattile Maina".
