= Dilip Kumar =

Indian actor (1922–2021)

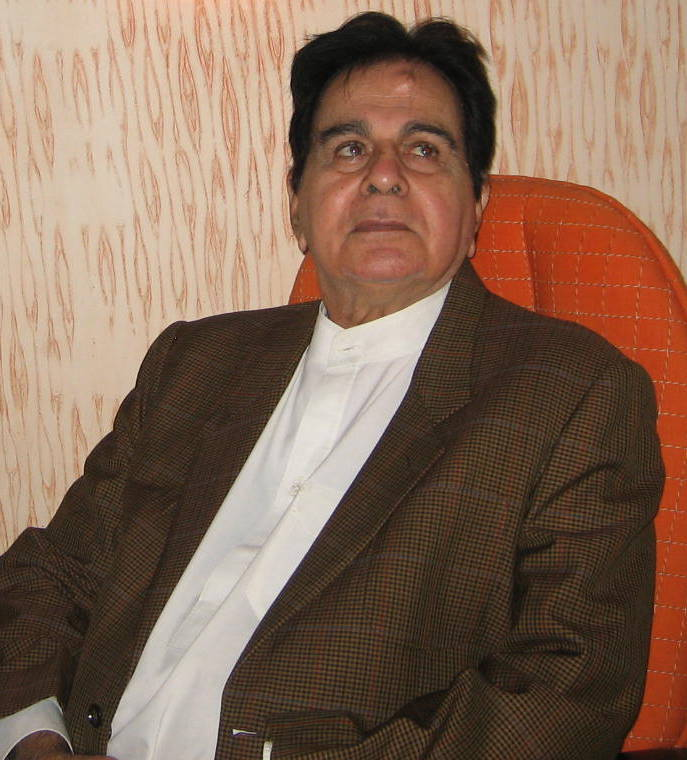
- Kumar in 2006
- Pronunciation: [d̪ɪliːp kʊmɑːɾ]
- Born: Muhammad Yusuf Khan; 11 December 1922; Peshawar, North-West Frontier Province, British India
- Died: 7 July 2021 (aged 98); Mumbai, Maharashtra, India
- Resting place: Juhu Qabrastan, Mumbai
- Occupations: Actor; writer; ghost director; film producer
- Years active: 1944–1998
- Works: Full list
- Spouses: Saira Banu (m. 1966); Asma Rehman (m. 1981; div. 1983)
- Relatives: Nasir Khan (brother); Begum Para (sister-in-law); Ayub Khan (nephew); K. Asif (brother-in-law); Mian Ehsan-ul-Haq (father-in-law); Naseem Banu (mother-in-law); Sayyeshaa (grandniece)
- Awards: Filmfare Award for Best Actor (8 times); Dadasaheb Phalke Award (1994)
- Honours: Padma Bhushan (1991); Nishan-E-Imtiaz (1998); Padma Vibhushan (2015)

Member of Parliament, Rajya Sabha
- In office 3 April 2000 – 2 April 2006
- Constituency: Maharashtra

Muhammad Yusuf Khan (Note: Pashto pronunciation: [mu(h)ɐˈmad jusuf xɑn].) (11 December 1922 – 7 July 2021), known professionally as Dilip Kumar (Note: Hindustani pronunciation: [d̪ɪliːp kʊmɑːɾ].) (Hindustani: [d̪ɪliːp kʊmɑːɾ]), was an Indian actor, writer and film producer best known for his work in Hindi cinema. Credited with pioneering method acting in Hindi cinema, he dominated Indian cinema from the 1950s throughout the 1960s and is widely regarded as the greatest and most influential actor in the history of Indian Cinema.

In a career spanning over five decades, Kumar worked in 66 released films. He debuted as an actor in the film Jwar Bhata (1944), produced by Bombay Talkies. Following a series of unsuccessful ventures, he had his first box office hit in Jugnu (1947). He consistently starred in top–grossing Indian films from the late-1940s to the 1960s, such as Shaheed, Andaz, Babul, Deedar, Aan, Uran Khatola, Insaniyat, Azaad, Naya Daur, Madhumati, Paigham, Kohinoor, Mughal-E-Azam, Gunga Jumna and Ram Aur Shyam. Some of his most acclaimed performances, include Nadiya Ke Paar, Shabnam, Jogan, Tarana, Daag, Sangdil, Shikast, Footpath, Amar, Devdas, Musafir, Yahudi, Leader, Aadmi and Sunghursh.

The 1970s saw Kumar's career take a downturn, with only one major success, Gopi (1970). In 1976, he went on a brief hiatus from film performances and returned with the revolutionary drama Kranti (1981), which was the highest-grossing Indian film of the year. He continued to play leading roles in films such as Vidhaata (1982), Karma (1986), and Saudagar (1991). His last on-screen appearance was in the commercially unsuccessful Qila (1998), which saw him in a dual role. Kumar later served as a member of the Rajya Sabha, the upper house of India's parliament, from 2000 to 2006.

Kumar's personal life was the subject of much media attention; however, he himself had largely avoided media limelight and endorsements. He was in a long-term relationship with actress and frequent co-star Madhubala that ended after the Naya Daur court case in 1957. He married actress Saira Banu in 1966 and resided in Bandra, a suburb of Mumbai, until his death in 2021. For his contributions to film, the Government of India awarded him with the Padma Bhushan in 1991 and the Padma Vibhushan in 2015, the country's third and second-highest civilian awards respectively. He was also awarded India's highest accolade in the field of cinema, the Dadasaheb Phalke Award in 1994. In 1998, the Government of Pakistan conferred Kumar with Nishan-e-Imtiaz, their highest civilian decoration, making him the only Indian to have received the honour. The house that Kumar grew up in, located in Peshawar, was declared a national heritage monument in 2014 by the Pakistani government.

== Early life ==
Dilip Kumar was born Muhammad Yusuf Khan on 11 December 1922, into a Hindko-speaking Hindkowan Awan Muslim family in the Qissa Khawani Bazaar neighbourhood of Peshawar, a city in the North-West Frontier Province of British India. He was one of the twelve children of Lala Ghulam Sarwar Ali Khan (1890–5 March 1950) and his wife Ayesha Bibi (1897–27 August 1948). His father was a fruit merchant.

Khan studied at the Barnes School in Deolali (now in Maharashtra), where his father owned orchards. He grew up in the same neighbourhood in Peshawar as Raj Kapoor, his childhood friend, and later his colleague in the film industry. In 1940, he moved to Pune and set up a dry fruit supply shop and a canteen. Despite hailing from Peshawar, Khan's family decided to remain in Bombay following the Partition of India in 1947.

Khan never acted under his birth name, debuting in Jwar Bhata in 1944 under the stage name Dilip Kumar. In his autobiography, Dilip Kumar: The Substance and the Shadow, he wrote that the name was a suggestion from Devika Rani, who was one of the producers on Jwar Bhata. In an interview in 1970, he said that he adopted this name out of fear of his father, who never approved of his acting career because of the general poor image of cinema back then.

== Career ==
=== 1940s: First film roles and initial success ===
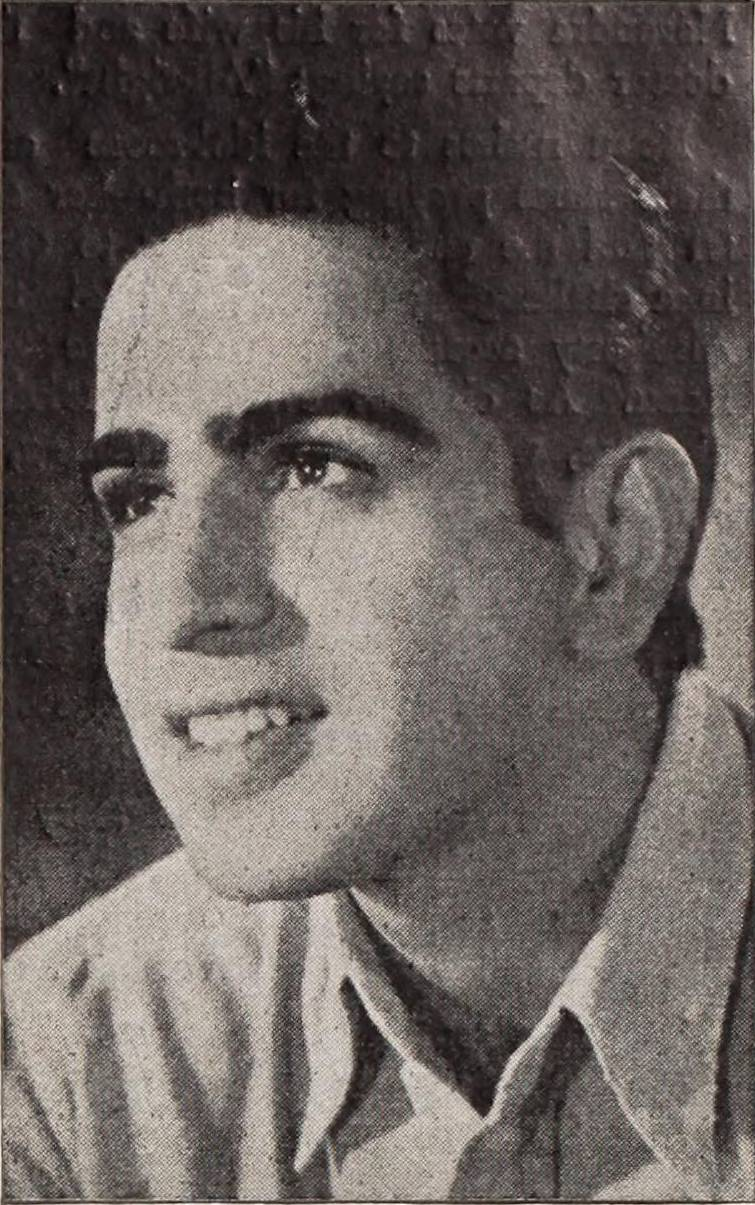
Kumar in Jwar Bhata, his first film.

Kumar's first film was Jwar Bhata in 1944, which went unnoticed. After two more unsuccessful films, it was his fourth film Jugnu (1947), in which he starred alongside Noor Jehan, that became his first major hit at the box office. His next major hits were the 1948 films Shaheed and Mela. Both Jugnu and Shaheed were the highest grossing Hindi films of their respective year of release.

He got his breakthrough role as an actor in 1949 with Mehboob Khan's Andaz, in which he starred alongside Raj Kapoor and Nargis. At the time of its release, Andaz was the highest-grossing Indian film ever, until its record was broken by Kapoor's Barsaat that same year. Shabnam was another box office hit that was also released in 1949.

=== 1950s and 1960s: Superstardom ===
The 1950s was Kumar's most successful and prolific decade with him playing leading roles in several box office hits such as Jogan (1950), Babul (1950), Deedar (1951), Tarana (1951), Daag (1952), Aan (1952), Uran Khatola (1955), Insaniyat (1955), Devdas (1955), Naya Daur (1957), Yahudi (1958), Madhumati (1958) and Paigham (1959). He also provided the background narration for Angaray (1954) which starred his brother Nasir Khan as the main lead, albeit uncredited. During this period, Kumar formed popular on-screen pairings with many of the top actresses at the time including Vyjayanthimala, Madhubala, Nargis, Nimmi, Meena Kumari and Kamini Kaushal. Together with fellow contemporaries Raj Kapoor and Dev Anand, he dominated the 1950s which is considered a part of the golden era of Hindi cinema. Though the three did not appear in any one film together, Kumar did appear with Raj Kapoor in Andaz (1949) and Dev Anand in Insaniyat (1955).

Several of his films established his screen image as the "Tragedy King". Kumar briefly suffered from depression due to portraying many tragic roles and on the advice of his psychiatrist, he also took on light-hearted roles. Mehboob Khan's big-budget 1952 swashbuckling musical Aan featured him in one of his first lighter roles and marked his first film to be shot in technicolor. Aan was the first Indian film to have a wide release across Europe with a lavish premiere in London. Aan was the highest-grossing Indian film ever at the time, domestically and overseas. He had further success with lighter roles as a thief in the hit comedy Azaad (1955). In 1957, he appeared in the third segment of the anthology film Musafir, which was the directorial debut of Hrishikesh Mukherjee. He also did playback singing for a song in the film with Lata Mangeshkar.

By this time, he had developed his distinct, signature style of understated acting of mumbling his dialogues while giving myriad expressions and meanings to lines that his characters uttered.

He was the first actor to win the Filmfare Best Actor Award (for Daag) and went on to win it a further seven times. 9 of his 21 films in the 1950s were ranked in the Top 30 highest-grossing films of the decade.

In the 1950s, Kumar became the first Indian actor to charge 1.5 lakh per film. (equal to 60 cr or above of 2024)

In 1960, he portrayed Prince Salim in K. Asif's big-budget epic historical film Mughal-e-Azam, which was the highest-grossing film in Indian film history for 15 years until it was surpassed by the 1975 film Sholay. Mughal-e-Azam was in the making for over a decade and was originally shot in black and white, with only two songs and the climax scenes shot in colour. 44 years after its original release, it was fully colourised and theatrically re-released in 2004 and was once again a box office success. That same year he played another lighter role in the musical comedy Kohinoor which was also among the highest grossers of the year.

In 1961, Kumar wrote, produced, and starred in the dacoit drama Gunga Jumna alongside his brother Nasir Khan, playing the title roles of Gunga and Jumna respectively. Kumar produced the film under his production company 'Citizen Films' and despite it being the highest-grossing film of the year, it would be the only film he produced. Though the directing credit went to the veteran director Nitin Bose, it was rumoured that Kumar had ghost directed the film as well as being involved in every aspect of its production. He chose the shade of saree that his co-star Vyjayanthimala would wear in every scene. The film received the National Film Award for Second Best Feature Film in Hindi, the Paul Revere Silver Bowl at the Boston International Film Festival, the Special Honour Diploma from the Czechoslovak Academy of Arts in Prague, and the Special Prize at the Karlovy Vary International Film Festival. The same year, he also worked uncredited as a background narrator for B. R. Chopra's Dharmputra (1961).

In 1962, British director David Lean reportedly offered him the role of "Sherif Ali" in his film Lawrence of Arabia (1962), but Kumar declined to perform in the movie. The role eventually went to Omar Sharif, the Egyptian actor. Kumar commented in his much later released autobiography, "he thought Omar Sharif had played the role far better than he himself could have". Kumar was reportedly also being considered for a leading role opposite Elizabeth Taylor in a film that Lean was working on called Taj Mahal, before the project was cancelled.

After a three-year hiatus, he returned in 1964 with his next film Leader, which underperformed at the box office and ended up being only an average grosser. Kumar was also credited with writing the story of this film. His next film Dil Diya Dard Liya (1966), opposite Waheeda Rehman was a box office flop. It was rumoured that he had ghost directed the film but the final credit was given to Abdul Rashid Kardar.

That same year, he made his debut in Bengali cinema with a guest appearance in Paari, which starred Dharmendra in the lead role. In 1967, Kumar played a dual role of twins separated at birth in the hit film Ram Aur Shyam. In 1968, he starred alongside Manoj Kumar in Aadmi and opposite Sanjeev Kumar and Balraj Sahni in Sunghursh, which were both average grossers at the box office.

=== 1970s: Slump and hiatus ===
In 1970, Kumar played the title role in the Bengali film Sagina Mahato, which marked his first onscreen pairing with his wife Saira Banu. In the same year, he starred alongside Banu again in Gopi, which was a box office success. In 1972, he once again played dual roles as twin brothers in Dastaan, which was a box office flop and began a decline in Kumar's career as a leading man. The same year, he made an uncredited friendly appearance in Gulzar's Koshish starring Sanjeev Kumar. A Hindi remake of Sagina Mahato, simply titled Sagina was made in 1974 with both Kumar and Banu reprising their roles which also failed to do well at the box office. He also provided the uncredited voice narration for Naya Din Nai Raat (1974) in which he was originally supposed to essay nine different characters which he refused to do and suggested Sanjeev Kumar's name who, ultimately, performed the job. 1976, he played triple roles as a father and twin sons in Bairaag. Though his performance in triple roles was acclaimed, the film was his third consecutive failure at the box office. He personally regarded M. G. Ramachandran's performance in Enga Veettu Pillai better than his role in Ram Aur Shyam. He regards his performance in Bairaag much higher than that of Ram Aur Shyam. The rise of actors like Rajesh Khanna, Amitabh Bachchan and Sanjeev Kumar led to Kumar losing film offers from 1970 to 1980. He took a five-year hiatus from films from 1976 to 1981.

=== 1980s: Return to success ===
In 1981, he returned to films, reinventing himself in elderly character roles. His comeback film was the star-studded historical epic Kranti which was the biggest hit of the year. Appearing alongside an ensemble cast including Manoj Kumar, Shashi Kapoor, Hema Malini and Shatrughan Sinha, he played the title role as revolutionary fighting for India's independence from British rule. In the post-Kranti phase, Kumar reinvented himself to play the "Angry Old Man" In 1982, he collaborated with director Subhash Ghai for the first time with Vidhaata, in which he starred alongside Sanjay Dutt, Sanjeev Kumar and Shammi Kapoor. Vidhaata was the highest-grossing film of the year. Later that year he starred alongside Amitabh Bachchan in Ramesh Sippy's Shakti, which was an average grosser at the box office, but won him critical acclaim and his eighth and final Filmfare Award for Best Actor. In 1984, he starred in Yash Chopra's social crime drama Mashaal opposite Anil Kapoor, which failed at the box office, but his performance was critically acclaimed. He also appeared alongside Rishi Kapoor in Duniya (1984) and Jeetendra in Dharm Adhikari (1986).

His second collaboration with Subhash Ghai came with the 1986 ensemble action film Karma. Karma marked the first film which paired him opposite fellow veteran actress Nutan, although they were previously paired in an incomplete and unreleased film in the 1950s titled Shikwa. He acted opposite Nutan again in the 1989 action film Kanoon Apna Apna which also reunited him with Sanjay Dutt.

=== 1990s: Directorial debut and final works ===
In 1990, he co-starred with Govinda in the action thriller Izzatdaar. In 1991, Kumar starred alongside fellow veteran actor Raaj Kumar in Saudagar, his third and last film with director Subhash Ghai. This was his second film with Raaj Kumar after 1959's Paigham. Saudagar was to be Kumar's penultimate film and last box office success. In 1994, he won the Filmfare Lifetime Achievement Award for his contributions to the industry.

In 1991, producer Sudhakar Bokade who had previously worked with Kumar in Izzatdaar announced a film titled Kalinga which would officially mark Kumar's directorial debut after he had allegedly previously ghost-directed Ganga Jamuna (1961) and Dil Diya Dard Liya (1967). Kumar was also set to star in the title role with the cast including Raj Babbar, Raj Kiran, Amitoj Mann and Meenakshi Seshadri. After being delayed for several years, Kalinga was eventually shelved with only 70% filming completed.

In 1998, Kumar made his last film appearance in the box office flop Qila, where he played dual roles as an evil landowner who is murdered and as his twin brother who tries to solve the mystery of his death.

=== 2000s–2021: Shelved projects and political career ===
In 2001, Kumar was set to appear in a film titled Asar – The Impact alongside Ajay Devgan and Priyanka Chopra, which was shelved due to Kumar's declining health. He was also set to appear in Subhash Ghai's war film Mother Land, alongside Amitabh Bachchan and Shah Rukh Khan, but this film was shelved after Khan decided to leave the project.

His classic films Mughal-e-Azam and Naya Daur were fully colourised and re-released in cinemas in 2004 and 2008 respectively. An unreleased film he had shot and completed titled Aag Ka Dariya was set for a theatrical release in 2013 but has not been released to date.

Kumar was a member of the Rajya Sabha, the upper house of India's parliament, from 2000 to 2006. He was nominated by the Indian National Congress to represent Maharashtra. Kumar utilised a significant portion of his MPLADS fund towards the construction and improvement of the Bandstand Promenade and the gardens at Bandra Fort at Lands End in Bandra.

== Personal life ==
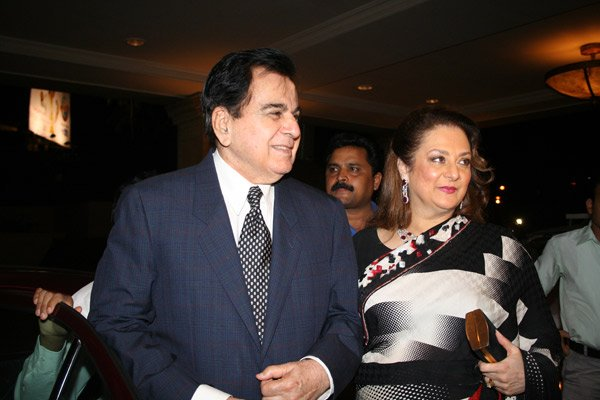
Kumar with his wife Saira Banu in 2007

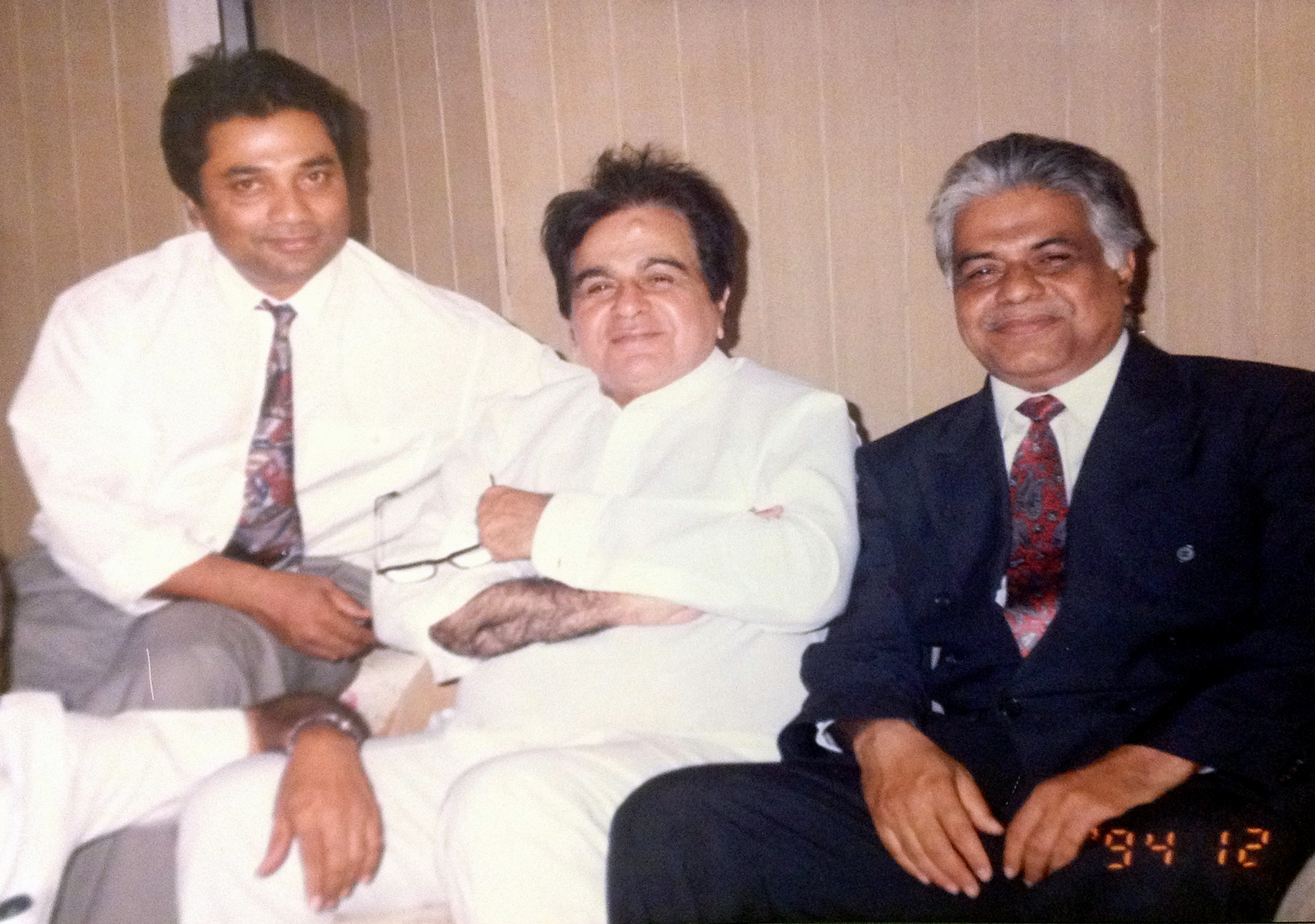
Kumar hosting his Bangladeshi friends Annisul Huq and A. K. A. Firoze Noon at his home in Bombay.

Kumar and Madhubala were drawn to each other during the shooting of Tarana (1951). They were in a relationship for seven years until the Naya Daur court case, during which Kumar testified against Madhubala and her father, ending their relationship. They never worked together again after Mughal-e-Azam (1960). Kumar later expressed in his autobiography, "Was I in love with Madhubala as the newspapers and magazines reported at that time? As an answer to this oft-repeated question straight from the horse's mouth, I must admit that I was attracted to her both as a fine co-star and as a person who had some of the attributes I hoped to find in a woman at that age and time...She, as I said earlier, was very sprightly and vivacious and, as such, she could draw me out of my shyness and reticence effortlessly." However, Kumar shared in his biography that contrary to popular notion, Madhubala's father Ataullah Khan wasn't opposed to their match but instead, wanted to turn this marriage into a business venture which did not land well with him.

On 11 October 1966, Kumar married actress Saira Banu. He was 43 and she was 22 at the time of their wedding, theirs being a love marriage. He later married Hyderabad socialite Asma Rahman, taking her as a second wife in 1981. That marriage ended in January 1983. Banu and he lived in Bandra. They did not have any children. In his autobiography, Dilip Kumar: The Substance and the Shadow, he revealed that Banu had conceived in 1972, but developed complications in the pregnancy, leading to a miscarriage. Following this, they did not try to have children again, believing it to be God's will.

Kumar was fluent in his native Hindko, in his later years aiming to establish a Hindko Academy in Peshawar in order to safeguard the language, as well as Urdu, Hindi, English, Punjabi, Marathi, Pashto and Farsi. He was also a great music enthusiast and also learnt how to play the sitar for a film. He loved cricket and played it often. He led a cricket team against Raj Kapoor in a friendly cricket match held for charity. Both growing up in Peshawar and in Bombay, Dilip Kumar and his family had a close relationship with the Kapoor family.

His younger brother Nasir Khan (1924 – 1974) was also a noted film actor. Two of his younger brothers, Aslam Khan (1932 – 2020) and Ehsan Khan (1930 – 2020), died after testing positive for COVID-19 in 2020, within a space of two weeks.

He was a first cousin to Arshad Sami Khan, a Pakistani pilot-turned-diplomat and father of Adnan Sami, a naturalized Indian singer.

== Death ==
Kumar died at Hinduja Hospital, Mumbai, on 7 July 2021 at 7:30 am, aged 98, after a prolonged illness. He had been suffering from several age-related issues and was diagnosed with pleural effusion. The Government of Maharashtra approved his burial with state honours under COVID-19 restrictions at the Juhu Muslim Cemetery that same day.

Expressing their condolences, Prime Minister Narendra Modi stated in a tweet that Kumar would be remembered as a cinematic legend, while the President, Ram Nath Kovind, stated that "he was loved across the subcontinent". The Prime Minister of Pakistan, Imran Khan, also expressed condolences for his death and remembered his efforts in raising funds for the Shaukat Khanum Memorial Cancer Hospital in a tweet. and the former President of Afghanistan, Hamid Karzai also expressed condolences to Kumar and his family.

== Artistry and legacy ==
Kumar is widely considered one of the greatest and most influential actors in the history of Indian cinema, and cinema in general. He inspired many great Indian cinema actors from contemporaries like Balraj Sahni to succeeding generations of artists, including Rajendra Kumar, Dharmendra Deol, Manoj Kumar, Amitabh Bachchan, Naseeruddin Shah, Raj Babbar, Kamal Haasan, Anupam Kher, Anil Kapoor, Mammootty, Aamir Khan, Shah Rukh Khan and Irrfan Khan among others. Besides his wife and actress Saira Banu, he is the favourite actor of actresses Asha Parekh, Mumtaz and Shabana Azmi among others. Kumar, who pioneered his own form of method acting without any acting school experience, was described as "the ultimate method actor" by renowned filmmaker Satyajit Ray. Actress Asha Parekh, in her autobiography The Hit Girl stated, "I admired Dilip Kumar unconditionally – whenever his films had a tragic ending, I would cry my heart out." Despite never getting to work with Kumar apart from a shelved film Zabardast, she always cited Dilip Kumar as her favourite actor in many of her interviews. In an online interview with Junoon–e–Kishore Studios, singer Amit Kumar stated that his father Kishore Kumar considered Dilip Kumar his (Kishore's) favourite Indian actor, followed by his eldest brother Ashok Kumar and Motilal.

A part of the "Trinity – The Golden Trio" (along with Dev Anand and Raj Kapoor), Kumar is popularly referred to as "Abhinay Samrat" (Hindi for "Emperor of Acting") by the audience. He was also dubbed in the media as "Tragedy King" because of the acclaimed dramatic roles he took early in his career and is also retrospectively known as the "The First Khan of Bollywood." Other than these, of recent, he is often referred in the media as "The Kohinoor of Indian Cinema". Kumar was the biggest Indian star of the 1950s and 1960s era, a national icon and the country's highest paid actor during this period. His prolific period as a leading artist coincides with what retrospectively came to be known as the "Golden Age of Hindi Cinema", with him playing a key role in its legacy. Film historian Maithili Rao states, "He towered like a mountain in the middle of Hindi film history, obscuring his predecessors and dwarfing his contemporaries." He is retrospectively recognised as "The First Superstar of Indian cinema". He became one of the earliest and most revered stars in the history of Indian cinema having legions of fans across the subcontinent and among the South Asian diaspora worldwide. In 2013, on the occasion of the centenary of Indian cinema, he was declared the "Biggest superstar of all time" by Filmfare in its poll of the same title.

As of 2020, he is by far, the most successful Bollywood star of all time with over 80% box-office successes and numerous gross records. Kumar appeared in Box Office India's "Top Actors" list nineteen times from 1947 to 1965. He topped the list sixteen times (1948–1963). Trade analysts have acknowledged that many of his films were commercially successful despite their heavy theme and non-commercial nature because the masses gathered in cinemas across India only to see him act, a unique feat as anything such hasn't happened with any other actor. This had been particularly apparent in the late 1940s and early 1950s, a period in which he got the title of "Tragedy King" in media outlets. In the review of the last film of his initial phase, the 1976 musical Bairaag, The Hindu, remarked, "For more than 25 years Dilip Kumar was the king at the box office. His name was almost a guarantee of success not only at the time of the release of the film but even in re-runs his films made more money than fresh releases of many of his contemporaries." Renowned director, Hrishikesh Mukherjee, called him "a phenomenon at the time", stating all his films had the hype, "he was absolutely a one-man industry".

In the second phase of his career, which saw him playing mature roles that were the main leads of his films, often driving them to immense success, Box Office India notes, "This was the part of his illustrious career which sets him apart from all other actors as no one else has managed to such success as a character artist." Renowned actor Irrfan Khan, remarked, "Till date, no other actor has had that kind of an impact on people's hearts. The kind of combination he brought along – of an actor and a star – was never seen before him. It started with him, and ended with him. His career, his working style, his personal lifestyle or his choice of films, nothing sets a wrong example. He is a true legend. These days, the word 'legend' is used loosely, but I strongly believe that he is the only one who deserves to be called the legend".

== Accolades ==
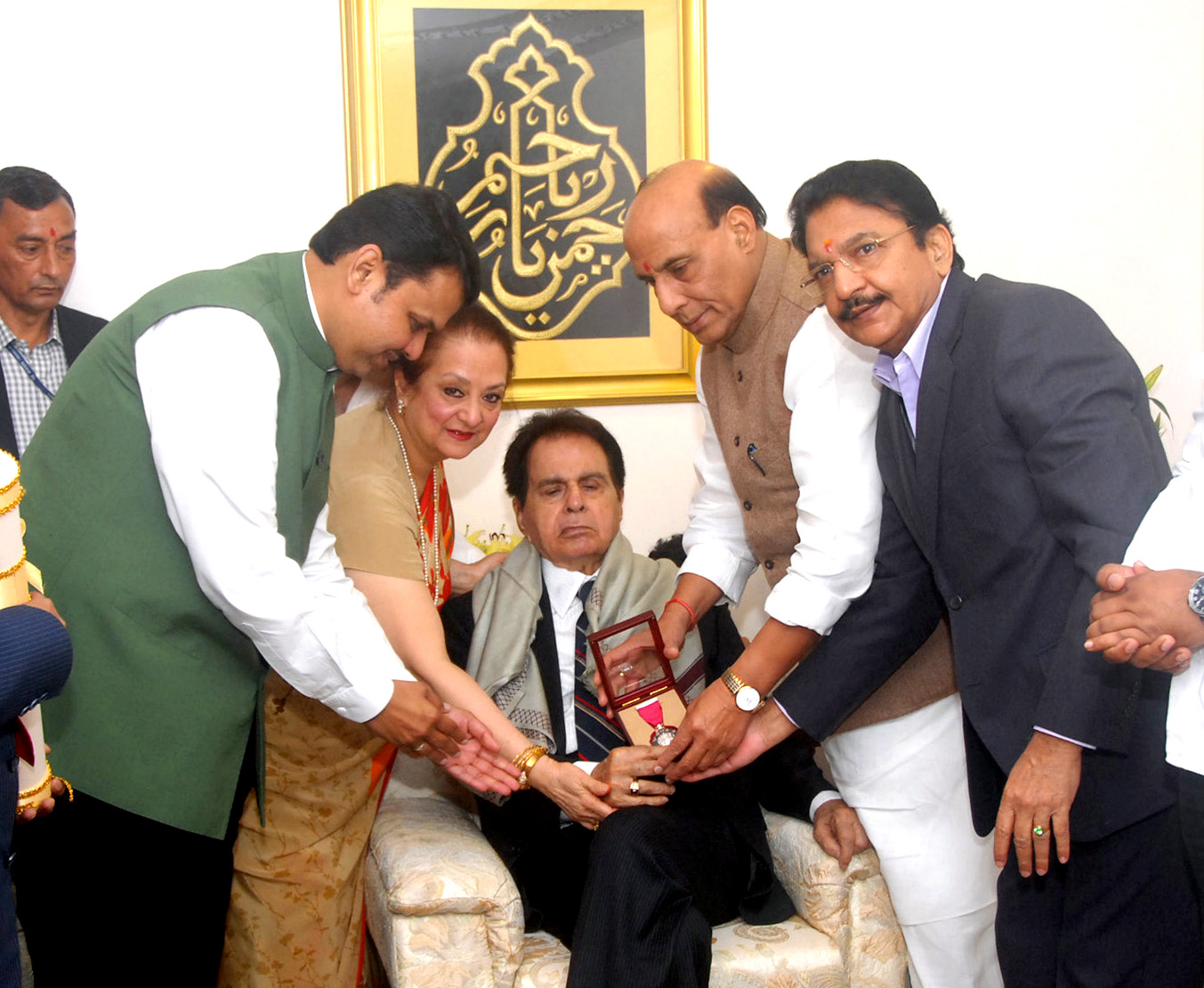
Kumar being awarded Padma Vibhushan by Home Minister Rajnath Singh (right), Chief Minister of Maharashtra Devendra Fadnavis (extreme left) and governor C. Vidyasagar Rao (extreme right) (c. 2015).

Kumar, Raj Kapoor and Dev Anand together formed "the golden trio" of Indian cinema in the 1950s and 1960s, with the camaraderie between the three contemporary actors, all renowned for their own style. Kumar was the biggest Indian star of this era, a national icon, holding the status of a matinée idol. He was the country's highest-paid actor during this period.

From the independence of India in 1947 to the late 2010s, Kumar held the record of performing in the highest number of highest-grossing films of the year (9 films), until his record was broken by Salman Khan, who performed in 10 such films. However, as per new reports from Box Office India, highest grossing Indian film in 1991 was Kumar's Saudagar (1991) instead of Khan's Saajan (1991), thus perhaps re-establishing his record.

He is the only actor in India to have delivered at least one bonafide "hit" at the box office for 15 years straight, from 1947 to 1961. He also did not give a single flop in a period of 15 years from 1952 to 1965. According to many sources, he is the only Indian actor to have more than one film (3 or 4) among the top 10 highest-grossing films of Indian cinema when adjusted for ticket-price inflation. These films are Naya Daur (1957), Mughal-e-Azam (1960), Gunga Jumna (1961), and Kranti (1981).

Over his career, Kumar received eight Filmfare Awards for Best Actor (with 19 total nominations), the most of any actor (and was also its inaugural recipient), and a Filmfare Lifetime Achievement Award (1993). He holds the record for most consecutive Filmfare award for Best Actor wins. He also received a Special Recognition Filmfare Award at the 50th Filmfare Awards for being one of the first recipients of Filmfare Awards along with Lata Mangeshkar and Naushad Ali. and a cine icon for his enduring legacy at the 70th Filmfare Awards along with Bimal Roy, Nutan and Meena Kumari.

Kumar was appointed Sheriff of Mumbai (an honorary position) in 1980. The Government of India honoured Kumar with the Padma Bhushan in 1991, the Dadasaheb Phalke Award in 1994 and the Padma Vibhushan in 2015. The Government of Andhra Pradesh honoured Kumar with NTR National Award in 1997. He was honoured with CNN-IBN's Lifetime Achievement Award in 2009. The Government of Madhya Pradesh honoured Kumar with Rashtriya Kishore Kumar Samman in 2015.

The Government of Pakistan conferred Kumar with the Nishan-e-Imtiaz, the highest civilian award in Pakistan, in 1998. The ruling political party of Shiv Sena in Maharashtra, India, had objected to this award and questioned Kumar's patriotism. However, in 1999, in consultation with the then Prime Minister of India Atal Bihari Vajpayee, Kumar retained the award. Vajpayee declared, "There is no doubt about film star Dilip Kumar's patriotism and commitment to the nation." Kumar later said in his autobiography that returning it "could have only soured relations further and produced bad vibes between India and Pakistan." Many believe this incident prolonged his wait for Bharat Ratna.

The House of Dilip Kumar in Peshawar, Pakistan, was declared a national heritage monument in 2014 by the then Pakistani Prime Minister Nawaz Sharif.

Kumar was voted the "Greatest Indian Actor of All Time" in a Rediff Readers poll in 2011. He holds the Guinness World Record for having received the most awards by an Indian actor. He was honoured by the World Book of Records on his 97th birthday for his "matchless contribution to Indian cinema and promoting social causes".
