= Ways That Are Dark =

Book by Ralph Townsend

Ways That Are Dark: The Truth About China
- Cover of the Barnes Review edition
- Author: Ralph Townsend
- Language: English
- Subject: Chinese society and culture
- Publisher: Putnam
- Publication date: 10 November 1933
- Publication place: United States
- Pages: 336

Ways That Are Dark: The Truth About China is a 1933 non-fiction book by Ralph Townsend which presents Townsend's observations on the state of then-contemporary China. The book is considered an anti-Chinese polemic by scholars.

A harsh critique of Chinese society and culture, Ways That Are Dark was written at a time when China was in the grip of considerable civil strife. Townsend claimed that the source of China's problems lay in fundamental defects in the ethnic characteristics of the Chinese people. Although the book was a bestseller in the United States, it met with highly polarized reactions from its supporters and detractors. Though praised by some periodicals, it was denounced by missionaries and sinologists, including Owen Lattimore who condemned it as "a general indictment of a whole race". It was banned by the government of China.

After World War II, the book fell into obscurity. It was reprinted in 1997 by the white nationalist publisher Barnes Review and subsequently gained renewed popularity in Japan in 2004 when a Japanese translation was published.

== Background ==
Ways That Are Dark is based on its author's experience of living in China for more than one year. Townsend had worked as a journalist and educator in New York before joining the United States Foreign Service on 16 December 1930. He served as a vice-consul in Shanghai between 10 December 1931 and 9 January 1932 and then in Fuzhou until 1 March 1933. The book was released on 10 November 1933 by G. P. Putnam's Sons.

== Summary of contents ==
In his introduction, Townsend describes the book as "an honest attempt to present the facts as they are, however unpleasant" and a counterbalance to the "maudlin sentiment" and "misinformation" of other writers on China who have made "fatuous attempts to sprinkle bright hopes over dark facts." He notes that while China's virtues will speak for themselves, "in appraising a stranger with whom we are to deal, it is important to know his shortcomings".

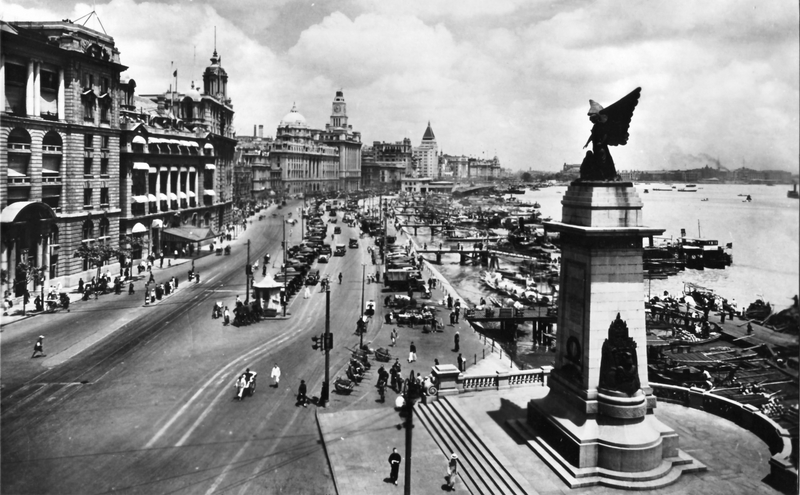
A 1928 photograph of the Bund of Shanghai where Townsend starts his story

In the first two chapters he describes the atrocious conditions he witnessed in China. Shanghai is depicted as a squalid, noisy, and polluted den of crime, poverty, and disease, and yet still comparatively wealthy compared to the rest of the country. The interior of China is difficult to access due to lack of infrastructure, is mostly unsafe for travel, and is wracked constantly by famine and starvation.

Townsend asserted in chapter one that the cause of China's present misery lies in the fundamental defects that exist in the ethnic characteristics of the Chinese people. In chapters three and four he explains what he believes these defects are. Townsend states that dishonesty is "the most prominent characteristic in the Chinese mentality as opposed to our own". Townsend gives many examples of him being lied to by Chinese employees, coolies, shopkeepers, and government officials, and notes that many other consuls were driven out of the service by this relentless and "aimless lying, with each lie merely a pretext for another".

According to Townsend, the other highly salient trait of the Chinese is their "indifference to fellow suffering". Through a large number of personal and second-hand anecdotes, Townsend argues that the Chinese may be the only people in the world who are completely unable to comprehend the basic human impulses of sympathy or gratitude toward other people. Because the Chinese feel no empathy toward others, they behave in an unbelievably sadistic and cruel fashion toward one another, and they view altruistic foreigners as targets to be mercilessly taken advantage of.

Other traits Townsend identifies as being typically Chinese are cowardice, lust for money, lack of a sense of personal hygiene, lack of critical thinking skills, insincerity, and obsession with hollow rites. Townsend believes that these personality traits are as notable among China's leaders and educated strata, as much as they are in the poor masses. Townsend's analysis of historical documents leads him to believe that they are not a recent product of the present chaos, but rather are deeply ingrained traits of China's national character. He concludes that the "outstanding characteristics" of the Chinese people "neither enable other peoples to deal satisfactorily with them, nor enable the Chinese to deal satisfactorily with themselves."

In chapters five and six, Townsend discusses US-funded charitable organizations in China, especially missions. He points out that although the United States had given at least $160 million in philanthropy to China, these charities in China, even secular hospitals and schools, are generally preyed upon by the very Chinese people whom the charitable workers seek to help. These charities are subject to rampant looting, arson, and murderous mob violence by Chinese people, who their government refuses to prosecute. Much of this violence is incited by the anti-foreigner propaganda of the KMT, a party described as being "worse than the Ku Klux Klan at its most degenerate stage", and through US aid to China Townsend suggests that America is actually bankrolling propaganda against itself.

Though the missionaries are sincere and hard-working, Townsend finds that they suffer from extreme delusion over the ultimate futility of their goal of reforming the Chinese. The missionaries, he states, have willfully ignored overwhelming evidence that no degree of care or education can uproot the intrinsic sickness of Chinese culture. He calls for an end to all missionary and charitable work in China.

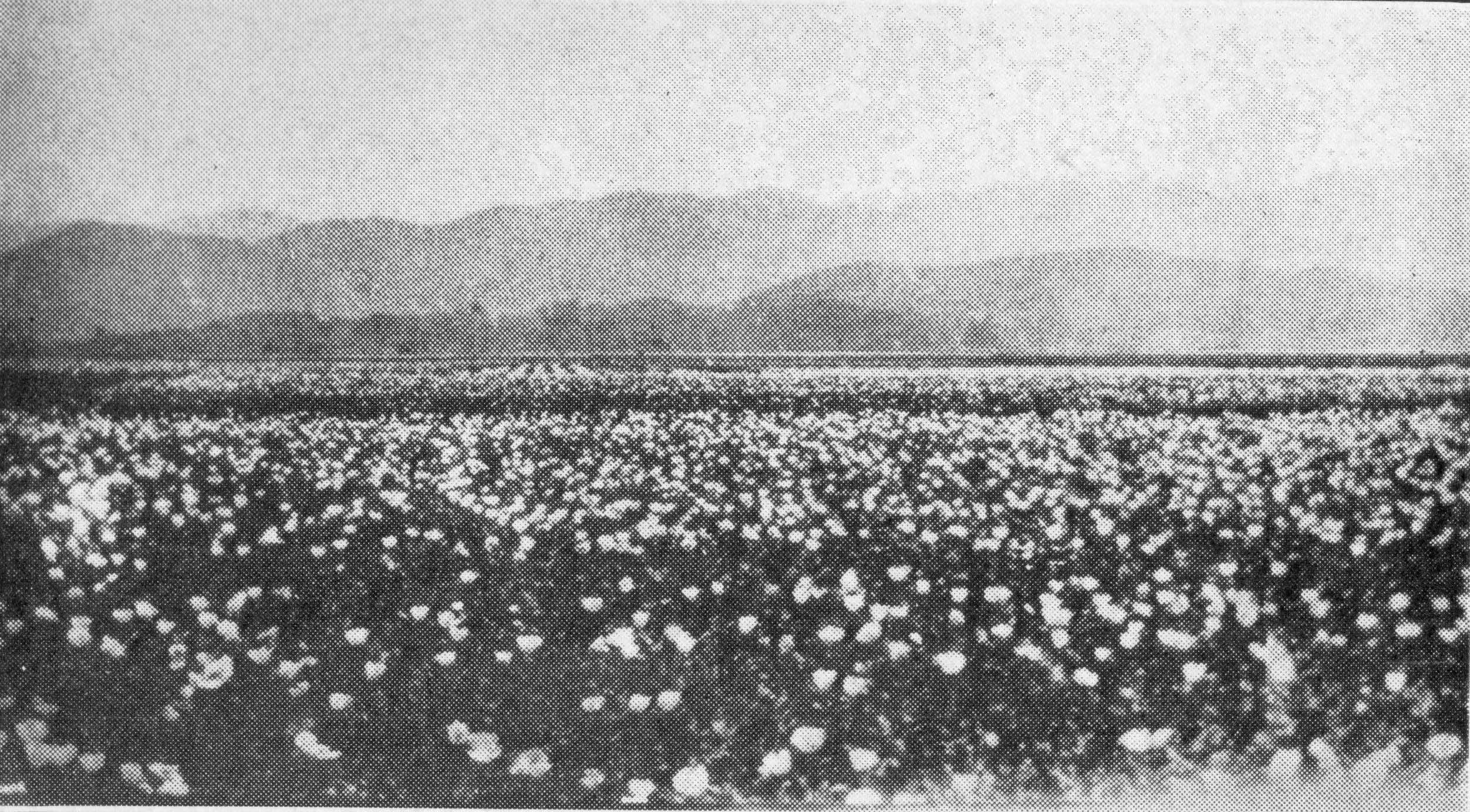
An opium field photographed in 1932 not far from Townsend's home in Fuzhou

In chapter seven, Townsend details the sheer horror of China's ongoing civil war. Among the factions competing for power in China, Townsend believes that none of them, neither the leaders nor their men, have any fixed loyalties or higher motivations apart from desire for loot. With every man only out for himself and "China's microscopically few good men... too weak to be felt", Townsend predicts no end to the chaos.

In chapter eight, much of the violence, Townsend explains, is fuelled by opium, the addiction of one out of every eight Chinese. Peasants are often compelled to plant opium by local administrators and warlords to pay for their armies, to such an extent that many districts are more heavily planted with opium than food, and all the while KMT officials lie incessantly to the international community about their efforts to suppress the trade.

In chapter nine, in contrast to the depredations of the KMT and other warlords, Townsend praises the positive influence of the Japanese in China. Townsend considered the Japanese to be a loyal, brave, reliable, honest, and cleanly people, and thus the polar opposites of the Chinese. Townsend provides his own firsthand account of the Shanghai Incident of 1932, which he claims was probably provoked by Chinese aggression, and similarly sees the Japanese decision to invade Manchuria as a fitting response to the "foredoomed contest of covert violence against the Japanese" waged by Zhang Xueliang (Chang Hsueh-liang). Townsend lavishes praise on the puppet state of Manchukuo as "a blessing to the thirty million or so Chinese living there" which has achieved "stability and well-being for millions". Townsend concludes that informed observers are grateful for Japan's role in dealing with an unruly China.

In chapter ten, Townsend affirms that the "backward Chinese" are America's "only legitimate problem in Asia" and asks what can be done to deal with a nation that spends aid money corruptly, does not respect its loans, mistreats and attacks foreigners, ignores international drug laws, will not protect foreign investment, and does not engage in productive diplomacy with other nations. He warns Americans that the Chinese see kindness only as weakness and thus can never respond to any type of positive reinforcement. "For every Chinese, from highest to lowest," he argues, "all the acts of life are concentrated upon extracting, from those who mean nothing to him, what he can for the benefit of himself and his clan." By contrast, he believes that the Chinese do understand force and respect strength. Therefore, he advocates that the United States forgo naive "sentimentalist" thinking and adopt a policy of "stern insistence upon our rights without cruel abuse of our strength", including withholding further loans without strict conditions and holding on to foreign concessions and extraterritoriality.

== Reception ==
Ways That Are Dark hit the bestsellers list in the United States, and The Robesonian noted that the book "was given lavish praise and bitter abuse by some of the leading newspapers in America". It was advertised as doing "for China what Katherine Mayo did for Mother India", and Foreign Affairs magazine described it as "a sensationally unorthodox and unvarnished picture of the Chinese".

=== Praise ===
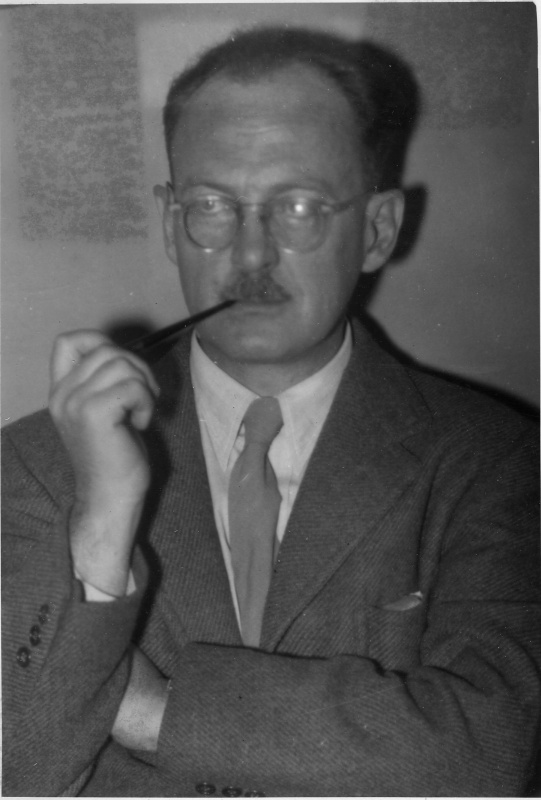
Owen Lattimore denounced the book as "a general indictment of a whole race"

E. Francis Brown, writing for Current History, approved of the book's comprehensive and frank discussion of conditions within China. Though the book takes a strongly negative stance towards China, Brown argued that "this very unfriendliness makes the book a welcome antidote to much that has been written in recent years and some of its conclusions might be well pondered by those who shape America's Far Eastern Policy."

Willis J. Abbot of the Christian Science Monitor especially praised Townsend's study of the social life and customs of the Chinese and claimed that "Any capable observer with a few weeks at his disposal in China will corroborate much that appears in this volume." His praise was echoed by Douglas Jerrold of The English Review who found the work "brilliant and outspoken".

=== Negative criticism ===
By contrast, Lewis S. Gannett of The Nation criticized Townsend for writing an "apology for Japan" and painting the Chinese as "all alike, all generically different from Japanese and Westerners". A similarly negative assessment published in The China Weekly Review observed that "A Chinese might easily write a similar book and by emphasizing the activities of the Capones and Dillingers, the bootleggers, kidnappers and racketeers, prove to his own satisfaction at least that the Americans constituted a degenerate branch of the white race." The Republican concluded its review of the book with "Throughout the presentation of his observations runs a thread of ill-considered bias which taints his words. We must look to other... more discerning writers for the truth about China."

Prominent sinologists were also critical of the work. In the pages of The New York Times, Owen Lattimore condemned Ways That Are Dark as "a general indictment of a whole race" which lacks insight, contains factual errors, and relies on second-hand accounts. He stated that the book would "only convince people who are convinced already."

Nathaniel Peffer denounced the book as "a rehash of all the old patter of the outport hotel lobbies, with all its half-truths, inaccuracies, provincialism, ignorance and sometimes crassness... [Townsend] has not managed to observe accurately the most simple and superficial things." JOP Bland, though deeming Townsend's conclusions "as a whole... unconvincing", at least found the chapter on opium "particularly instructive."

Among the book's detractors were missionaries, whom Townsend had criticized. They reviewed the book negatively in a variety of periodicals, including The Chinese Recorder, which accused Townsend of having "gathered a lot of stories and put them together in a clever, cynical and unusually warped way". Other negative reviews appeared in The Missionary Review of the World, The China Christian Year Book, and The Missionary Herald at Home and Abroad.

Ways That Are Dark continues to be noted for its Sinophobic viewpoint. In 1985, the historian Frank P. Mintz called it "a classic in the literature of Sinophobia." In 2000, the scholar Yong Chen referred to Townsend's attitude towards the ethnic characteristics of the Chinese people as being derivative of "the anti-Chinese prejudice that nineteenth-century writers had propagated." In 2004, the writer Gregory Clark described it as "a viciously anti-China book" that "contrasts an allegedly dirty, devious Chinese nation with the trustworthy, hardworking Japanese".

Though the book was originally to be called "Chinese Merry-Go-Round", the title under which it was ultimately published is a quote from Bret Harte's poem "The Heathen Chinee". Though "The Heathen Chinee" had been used a rallying cry by opponents of Chinese immigration to the United States, Harte had intended it as a parody of the anti-Chinese bigotry prevalent in the United States of the nineteenth century.

=== Political responses ===
The Japanese Army and Navy strongly approved of the book. Several thousand copies of it were bought by the War Ministry and Naval Ministry who by the beginning of 1934 were distributing the books for free to foreign journalists and officials. By contrast, the Nationalist Government of China responded by banning Townsend's book throughout China from 1935. Even so, the journalist George Moorad reported that in 1946 Chinese communists distributed contraband copies of the book to American China Marines in the hopes of disillusioning them about conditions in China.

== Revival in Japanese translation ==
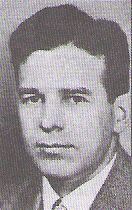
Ralph Townsend

Ways That Are Dark was already in its fifth printing by 1937, but in 1942 Townsend was imprisoned for having accepted money from the Japanese Committee on Trade and Information between 1937 and 1940 without registering as a foreign agent. The book was not re-printed again until the white supremacist magazine Barnes Review published a new edition in 1997.

In 2004, the Barnes Review edition was translated into Japanese by a pair of Japanese translators, Hideo Tanaka and Kenkichi Sakita. It became an instant success, selling out 10 successive re-printings before 2007, when it was reissued as a mass market paperback. In 2004, Gregory Clark noted that the Japanese edition of Ways That Are Dark, which was entitled Ankoku Tairiku Chūgoku no Shinjitsu ("The Truth About the Dark Continent China"), had garnered widespread popularity among members of the Japanese right-wing.

Tanaka, one of the translators of the book, praised Townsend in Shokun! magazine for his "penetrating insight" in reporting "starkly and vividly on the true nature of the Chinese that he had witnessed firsthand". Sakita, the other translator, likewise lauded the book in an article written for Nobukatsu Fujioka's Association for Advancement of Unbiased View of History, which aims to remove accounts of wartime atrocities committed by Japan during World War II from Japanese textbooks. Sakita called the book "essential reading to understand what China really is" and argued that Townsend's ideas continue to offer important lessons in conducting Sino-Japanese relations today. In 2004, the book was also reviewed positively by the newspaper Yomiuri Shimbun.

== See also ==
- America First
- Second Sino-Japanese War

== Bibliography ==
- Townsend, Ralph (1933). Ways That Are Dark: The Truth About China. New York: Putnam.
