= Ralph Townsend =

American author, consul, and political activist

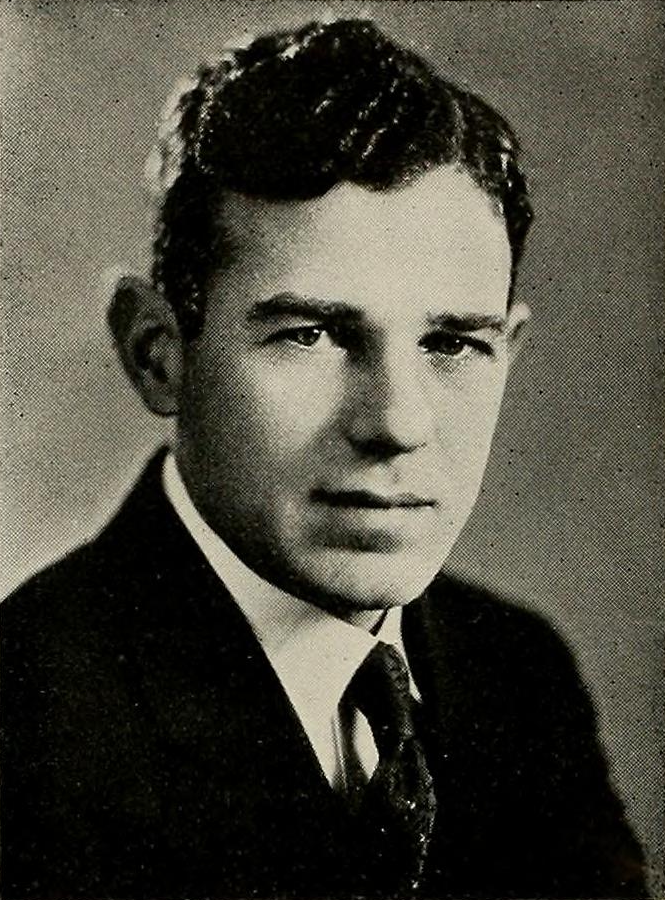
- Townsend in 1934
- Born: November 27, 1900; Raynham, North Carolina, U.S.
- Died: January 25, 1976 (aged 75); Fairfax, Virginia, U.S.
- Education: Columbia University Graduate School of Journalism
- Known for: advocacy of non-interventionism, arrest and imprisonment as a Japanese agent
- Notable work: Ways That Are Dark: The Truth About China
- Spouse: Janet (from 16 October 1926)

Ralph Townsend (November 27, 1900 – January 25, 1976) was an American writer, consul and political activist noted for his opposition to the entry of the United States into World War II. He served in the foreign service as a consul stationed in Canada and China from 1931 to 1933. Shortly after returning to the United States he came to prominence through his book Ways That Are Dark: The Truth About China, a harsh critique of Chinese culture which became a widely controversial bestseller. Townsend became a prominent advocate of non-interventionism, and in the 1930s and 1940s was well known for his vocal opposition to the Roosevelt administration's foreign policy from a pro-Japanese and pro-neutrality point of view.

Following the US entry into World War II, Townsend was arrested for acting as a Japanese agent without registering under the Foreign Agents Registration Act. He pleaded guilty, admitting that he had accepted payments before the war from a propaganda organization funded by the Japanese government, but denying that he was a Japanese agent. He was sentenced to 8 months to two years in prison. While serving his sentence, Townsend was a defendant in the Great Sedition Trial. After the war, he moved to Fairfax, Virginia, where he died on January 25, 1976. His writings continue to be influential in far-right circles.

== Early life, 1900–33 ==
Ralph Townsend was born on November 27, 1900, in Raynham, North Carolina to "one of Robeson county's oldest and most prominent families." He was the son of Richard Walter Townsend (1859–1937) and Mara Aurora McDuffie Townsend (1866–1906). He had four sisters and brothers, including Dallas Townsend, Sr. After graduating from Mount Hermon Preparatory School in Massachusetts, he attended Columbia University in New York City and in 1924 received his degree from Columbia University Graduate School of Journalism. He worked as a journalist in San Francisco for several years before returning to New York where he taught English at Columbia University from 1927 to 1930. On November 11, 1930, he passed the foreign service test and was posted to Montreal, Canada, as vice-consul on December 20, 1930.

His second assignment was to Shanghai, where he officially served as vice-consul between December 10, 1931, and January 9, 1932, though a two-month temporary detail kept him in the city long enough to witness the Shanghai Incident firsthand. After that he was stationed in Fuzhou up to his resignation from the service on March 1, 1933.

== Writing on Asian affairs, 1933–37 ==
Townsend's experiences in China formed the basis of his first book Ways That Are Dark: The Truth About China, the release of which on November 10, 1933, put Townsend in the spotlight both nationally and internationally. Billed as doing "for China what Katherine Mayo did for Mother India", Townsend's book included a controversial critique of Chinese society and culture. At a time when China was in the grip of civil strife, Townsend believed that the source of its problems lay in fundamental defects in the ethics of its people, including above all their propensity for dishonesty, lack of fixed loyalties outside of their family group, and inability to cooperate effectively with one another, as well as their greed, physical cowardice, and lack of critical thinking skills. He concludes that the "outstanding characteristics" of the Chinese people "neither enable other peoples to deal satisfactorily with them, nor enable the Chinese to deal satisfactorily with themselves" and predicts no end to chaotic conditions within the country. He also favorably contrasts what he considers Japan's sensible policies toward China with the naively "sentimentalist" ones adopted by the United States.

Ways That Are Dark became a bestseller and attracted vociferous reactions from both critics and supporters. Writing for Current History, E. Francis Brown praised the book as "a welcome antidote to much that has been written in recent years and some of its conclusions might be well pondered by those who shape America's Far Eastern Policy," but by contrast the prominent sinologist Owen Lattimore denounced the work as "a general indictment of a whole race" which lacked insight, relied on second-hand accounts, and would "only convince people who are convinced already." The book itself was entangled in the political turmoil it discussed, being banned by the government of China but distributed free of charge by the government of Japan.

The Robesonian, a newspaper of Townsend's native county, reported in February 1934 that he had "aroused more glowing praise and bitter abuse for his lectures and written comments on China than any other recent speaker and writer on Far East affairs." Townsend moved from New York back to San Francisco in 1934 where he continued to write and give lectures on Asian issues as well as teaching classes at Stanford University and advertising for the San Joaquin Light and Power Corporation. Until 1941, he resided in a number of Californian cities near San Francisco.

In 1936, Townsend published his second book, Asia Answers, in which he heaps praise on what he deems to be Japan's thriving political, economic, and cultural model and its growing and positive influence in Asia. He attributes anti-Japanese sentiment in the United States to pro-communist "liberals", above all the sensationalist newspaper editors and journalists who, he believes, despise Japan due to its status as the leading capitalist nation in Asia. He condemns liberals for having already wrecked the US economy, warns of a possible communist takeover of the United States, and ends by advocating that America resist anti-Japanese warmongering and adopt a foreign policy of neutrality towards Asia.

Townsend predicted that Asia Answers might have a frosty reception from reviewers because of what he alleged to be the pro-Soviet biases of the media, and indeed, the book received negative coverage in The China Weekly Review, The Times Literary Supplement, The Times of India, and The Living Age, the last of which deemed Asia Answers a work "suspiciously similar to press releases by the Tokyo Foreign Office" which would appeal to "none except avowed Fascists". Among the book's detractors was also Pearl S. Buck who described it as "so fraught with the prejudices and personality of the writer that it is impossible to criticize any of it without involving the author's whole scheme." On the other hand, the book was received more positively in Japan and in Manchukuo, where Sadatomo Koyama, a leader in the Manchuria Youth League, declared that "[Townsend's] understanding of China is impeccable" and strongly promoted the work. In 1937 Townsend made a trip to Japan coinciding with the release of the book's Japanese translation.

== Advocate of non-interventionism, 1937–41 ==
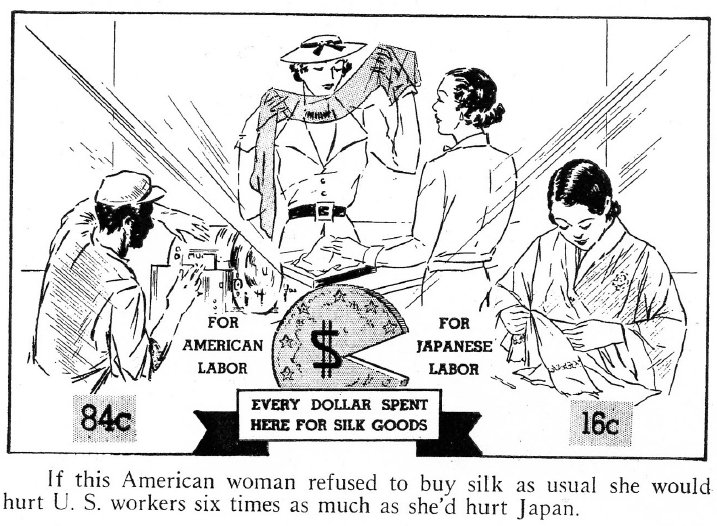
Townsend often used economic arguments in opposition to confrontation with Japan. This picture, from the pamphlet, There Is No Halfway Neutrality, argues that boycotting raw silk from Japan would mainly harm US clothes-makers.

After returning from Japan, Townsend, who described himself as a "conservative", was highly active in writing articles, delivering lectures, and making radio broadcasts in support of the movement to keep the United States out of the conflicts in Asia and Europe. In explaining the reason for his participation in the pro-neutrality movement, Townsend stated that while serving as a consul abroad he had "learned enough of the rottenness of international politics ... to wish to do my part of peace for this country."

Claiming that publishers would no longer accept anti-interventionist books, Townsend began self-publishing pamphlets. Between 1938 and 1940 he wrote a series of pamphlets which were extremely popular and widely circulated among anti-interventionists. Two of them, The High Cost of Hate and America Has No Enemies In Asia, had a circulation of at least 60,000 copies, while another, There Is No Halfway Neutrality printed 30,000 copies. The last pamphlet in the series, Seeking Foreign Trouble, attracted the attention of the German embassy in Washington, D.C. which bought and distributed more than 500 copies of it.

In his pamphlets, Townsend spoke out against boycotting products from Japan, noting that the United States conducted considerably more trade with Japan than China and arguing that peaceful trade with the Empire of Japan and Nazi Germany would serve the interests of American workers and consumers. He blamed "red elements" within China for starting the Second Sino-Japanese War, but praised Japan for the "humane" manner in which its armed forces have behaved in China, believing that it was only the Soviet Union and "a powerful minority" of pro-communist Americans who are conspiring to push America to war with Japan. Townsend predicted that if the Chinese won their war with Japan, the result would be a communist takeover of China, but he dismissed the idea that Japan might launch an attack on the United States as "simply too idiotic to discuss." On Europe, he averred similarly that German conduct was largely a defensive reaction to attempts by the British and French governments to "obliterate the Germans as an entity."

Townsend became an active member of America First after its formation in 1940, and was invited to speak at America First meetings on at least two occasions. Townsend, however, would appear as a private citizen when he came before the Senate Foreign Relations Committee on 8 February 1941 in opposition to the Lend-Lease Act. In a widely publicized testimony, Townsend condemned the legislation as tantamount to "a war bill" that would "assign dictatorial powers to the President" and would "make America the unmistakable aggressor against nations which have not sought objectively to molest us."

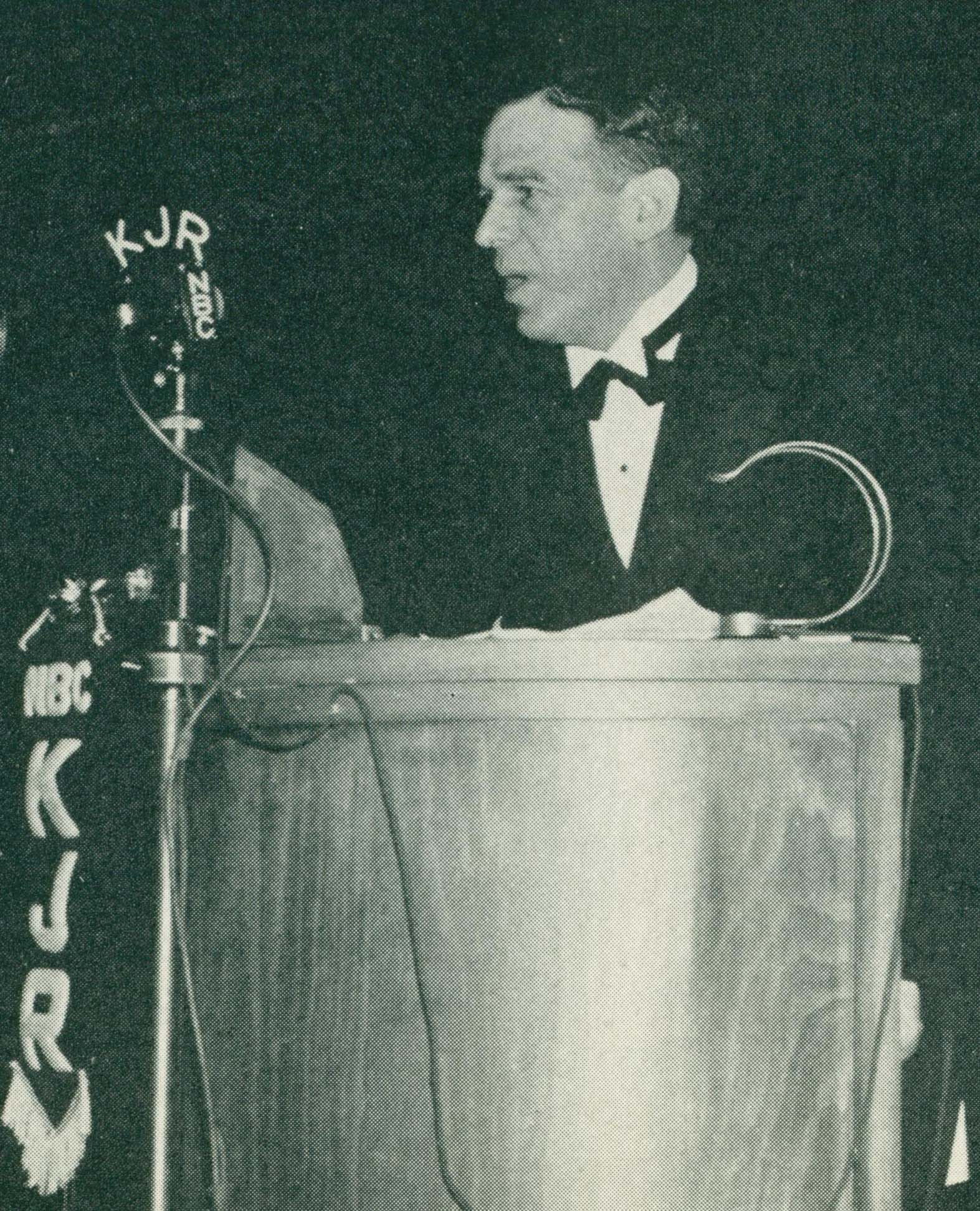
Townsend argues against interventionism in Asia at a nationally broadcast town hall meeting in Seattle in March 1941

Townsend's defense of Germany and Japan led him to be labelled as an "agent" and a "propagandist" by his opponents, charges which he denied. His activism brought him to the attention of George Teeple Eggleston, editor of Scribner's Commentator, an anti-interventionist magazine based in Lake Geneva, Wisconsin, and in June 1941 Townsend accepted an offer to move to Lake Geneva to serve as a contributor to the magazine. Shortly after Townsend became an assistant editor of The Herald.

== Arrest and imprisonment, 1941–44 ==
Townsend's first run-in with the law occurred on November 25, 1941, when federal prosecutors investigating German-funded propaganda in the United States sought him to answer questions before a grand jury about Scribner's Commentator. When he could not be found at his home in Lake Geneva a nationwide manhunt was launched, but three weeks later Townsend came forward willingly, claiming he had simply been on vacation in the southern United States and hadn't known he was wanted by the government. On 15 December, Townsend stated that he had no knowledge about how Scribner's Commentator was financed, but had strong confidence in the magazine's owners who he knew to be "good Americans." He added that while he had worked to prevent the outbreak of a conflict, he was now fully supportive of the US war effort. It emerged later that Nazi German agents had been surreptitiously bankrolling the magazine.

In January 1944, Douglas MacCollum Stewart, the former co-publisher of the publication, was sentenced to 90 days in jail for contempt of court for refusing to fully explain to a grand jury where he had obtained the $36,000 he used to purchase The Herald. In 1946, Stewart was charged with perjury for lying about the source of $15,000 in funds, which he'd received from Nazi Germany. A former German secretary, Baron Heribert von Strempel, identified Stewart as the man in whose New York hotel room he'd left $10,000 to $15,000 to help finance a Nazi propaganda magazine before the attack on Pearl Harbor. However, Stewart was acquitted in 1947. He died in 1949.

On January 28, 1942, FBI agents arrived at Townsend's home and arrested him for having acted as a Japanese agent without registering under the Foreign Agents Registration Act of 1938. A federal investigation into Japanese propaganda which had begun in November 1941 discovered that Townsend had received payments from the Japanese Committee on Trade and Information, a Japanese propaganda organization which had existed between 1937 and 1940. Though Townsend denied being a paid Japanese agent and claimed to be a victim of political persecution, he did admit to having accepting money from the committee, stating that it was merely a payment in exchange for the bulk sale of his pamphlets. Even so, Townsend opted to plead guilty on March 27 and requested a lenient sentence on the grounds that he was not aware his acts were illegal. Townsend also solicited the support of anti-interventionist politicians and received favorable character references by both former Senator Rush D. Holt and his longtime friend Senator Gerald Nye, the latter of whom described Townsend as "a loyal and patriotic American citizen". The presiding justice T. Alan Goldsborough was, however, unmoved, deeming his crimes "repulsive, obscene and macabre". On June 12, he sentenced Townsend, whom he called a "Hirohito hireling", to 8 months to two years in prison.

=== Defendant in the Great Sedition Trial ===
While in prison, Townsend became a defendant in what would become known as the "Great Sedition Trial". The trial arose from Roosevelt's conviction, against advice from his Attorney-General Francis Biddle, that the most vocal in defending Nazi Germany be tried for subversion. On July 23, 1942, Townsend and 27 other Americans were charged under the Smith Act and the Espionage Act with having participated in a German-backed conspiracy to publish seditious literature seeking to undermine the morale of members of the United States military. The indictment cited the following statement of Townsend's, which he had written in 1941 prior to US entry into the war, as proof that he had committed sedition:

With a fifth of the earth's people kept under their rule by force, [the British] bleat of fighting to liberate subject populations. Fighting now for the triumph of the bloodiest dictatorship ever known – Soviet Russia – they microphone to listening Americans their pious horror of dictatorships.

Townsend was arraigned on August 20, but strongly questioned the view that his writings were subversive as well as the legal foundations of the charges. Along with the other defendants, Townsend was as before strongly defended by senators with anti-interventionist sympathies, including Gerald Nye, who said the defendants were no more guilty of sedition than he had been for speaking out against intervening in the war. In fact there were from the beginning many concerns even within the US government about the validity of the proceedings and their constitutionality, as no clear evidence had yet been uncovered to demonstrate that the defendants were in collusion with Nazi Germany or with each other.

These problems led to repeated delays in the formal opening of the trial and the indictment had to be laid down a second time on 4 January 1943 after the first had expired. More delays arose, however, and when the indictment was laid down for a third time on 3 January 1944, Townsend's name had been dropped from the list. Although Francis Biddle initially said that Townsend would still be subject to prosecution in the future, in the end no further actions were taken. By then Townsend was bankrupted by legal costs and was deserted by most of his friends. Biddle himself later called the sedition case "a dreary farce".

At the time, The Washington Post reported that before the war, Townsend had accepted money from an individual connected to German agents in return for circulating anti-British pamphlets. Despite all this Townsend still insisted that, "I was never anybody's foreign agent. All I published was independently written and 100 per cent American", a stance which he maintained for the remainder of his life.

== Post-war life, 1945–76 ==
In the early-1950s Townsend moved to Fairfax, Virginia and by the time of his death was considered a "prominent resident". He helped organize the Fairfax Chamber of Commerce, of which he was the executive director, and in this capacity played a leading role in lobbying the CIA to locate its headquarters in Virginia. He also worked in advance of conservation. In 1967 he appeared before the House Committee on Interior and Insular Affairs as a member of Defenders of Wildlife and between 1972 and 1976 served on that organization's board of directors where he was known for "his insistence on sound financial management."

Townsend maintained friendships with far-right figures after the war, including Harry Elmer Barnes and Willis Carto, and for a time he worked as an editor and contributor to Carto's anti-Semitic magazine, The American Mercury, which introduced Townsend as "a former Foreign Service officer who made the mistake of fighting FDR's war plans". Townsend died in Fairfax on 25 January 1976 at the age of 75.

== Legacy and assessment ==
Historians have noted the stridency with which Townsend put forward his pro-Japanese views before World War II. Justus Doenecke, for instance, described Townsend, "The most adamant and extreme of the voices in America defending Japanese policy." Judith Papachristou concurs: "Few anti-imperialists were as extreme as isolationist Ralph Townsend." However, Townsend himself rejected the "isolationist" label during his life, and instead called himself a "realist" and "Pro-Peace".

Townsend is still held in esteem by many members of the extreme right in the United States and recently in Japan as well. After his death, his widow Janet turned over his papers to Larry Humphreys, an Oklahoma multimillionaire and supporter of right-wing militia and Christian Identity groups, who referred to Townsend as a man who "knew Roosevelt was trying to entice Japan into attacking the United States, and FDR had him jailed." Humphreys stored Townsend's papers in his so-called "Heritage Library," but today many of them are held by Barnes Review, an anti-Semitic organization under the leadership of Townsend's old friend Willis Carto. In 1997, Barnes Review re-published Ways That Are Dark: The Truth About China for the first time since World War II with a new foreword written by Carto, who praised Townsend as "a profound, genuinely courageous and painfully honest writer". In 2004, a Japanese translation of the Barnes Review edition of Ways That Are Dark was released in Japan, where it became a runaway success and quickly elevated Townsend to "hero" status among the Japanese far right.

The opinion of recent scholars on the quality of his writing have been mixed. Limin Chu, who analyzed his articles on China for the Overland Monthly and Out West Magazine, considered some of the claims as "either incredibly gullible or deliberately vicious," and the historian Justus Doenecke described his pamphlets as "crudely written." In contrast, Peter O'Connor, professor at Musashino University, found the same pamphlets "well-argued and researched."

== Bibliography ==
=== Books ===
- Ways That Are Dark: The Truth About China. New York: Putnam, 1933. OCLC 2274633
- Asia Answers. New York: Putnam, 1936. OCLC 3561777

=== Pamphlets ===
- Does Japan Slam the Door against American Trade in Areas of Japanese Influence in Asia? San Francisco: Japanese Chamber of Commerce, 1938. OCLC 2812462
- There Is No Halfway Neutrality. San Francisco: self-published, 1938. OCLC 12360876
- America Has No Enemies In Asia. San Francisco: self-published, 1938. OCLC 1541811
- The High Cost of Hate. San Francisco: self-published, 1939. OCLC 58937759
- Seeking Foreign Trouble. San Francisco: self-published, 1940. OCLC 11256314
- An Appeal to Patriotic Americans. Washington DC: self-published, 1943. OCLC 750182191

=== Articles ===
- "China Submits to Chaos," Current History, June 1933.
- "Our Slump in Foreign Pets," The North American Review, August 1933.
- "Mission Schools Curbed in China," New York Times, November 12, 1933.
- "America Watches Sino-Japanese Relations," Contemporary Japan, June 1934.
- "Let's Stop Baiting Japan," Overland Monthly and Out West Magazine, December 1934.
- "Meeting Japan's Challenge," Overland Monthly and Out West Magazine, June 1935.
- "Easing the Pacific Tension," Overland Monthly and Out West Magazine, July 1935.
- "La Chine, terre de l'opium," Revue Belge, January 15, 1936.
- "日本なくばアジアは「赤」," Asahi Shimbun, December 16, 1937.
- "Soviet Propaganda in America," The Far Eastern Review, August 1938.
- "Pidgin English 'Can Do'," New York Times, January 23, 1939.
- "Japan: Our Commercial Prize," Scribner's Commentator, November 1940.
- "Mercy – Strictly Political," Scribner's Commentator, March 1941.
- "Must We Fight Japan?," Scribner's Commentator, June 1941.
- "Publicity Reversal Technique," Scribner's Commentator, December 1941.
- "Sedition ... Then and Now," The American Mercury, Summer 1968.
- "The Context of Pearl Harbor," The American Mercury, Winter 1969.
- "Saving the Great Dismal Swamp," Defenders of Wildlife News, March 1973.

== Books cited ==
- Carlson, John Roy, Under cover: My four years in the Nazi underworld of America (Philadelphia: Blakiston, 1943).
- Cole, Wayne S., America First: The Battle Against Intervention, 1940–41 (Madison: University of Wisconsin Press, 1953).
- Doenecke, Justus, Storm on the Horizon: The Challenge to American Intervention 1939–1941 (Lanham, Maryland: Rowman & Littlefield Publishers, 2000).
- Doenecke, Justus, Anti-intervention: a bibliographical introduction to isolationism and pacifism from World War I to the early Cold War (New York: Garland, 1987).
- Eggleston, George Teeple, Roosevelt, Churchill, and the World War II Opposition : A Revisionist Autobiography (Old Greenwich, Connecticut: Devin-Adair Co., 1979).
- Hoke, Henry, It's A Secret (New York: Reynal & Hitchcock, 1946).
- Martell, Edward et al., Who Was Who Among English and European Authors, 1931–1949 (Detroit: Gale Research Co., 1978).
- Mintz, Frank P., Revisionism and the Origins of Pearl Harbor (Lanham, Maryland: University Press of America, 1985).
- O'Connor, Peter, "General Introduction," in Japanese Propaganda: Selected Readings, Series 2, Volume 1, ed. Peter O'Connor (Tokyo: Edition Synapse, 2005).
- Rogge, O. John, The Official German Report: Nazi penetration 1924–1942 (New York: T. Yoseloff, 1961).
- Schonbach, Morris, Native American Fascism During the 1930s and 1940s (New York: Garland, 1985).
- Steele, Richard W., Free speech in the Good War (New York: St. Martin's Press, 1999).
- Tanaka, Hideo, "ラルフ・タウンゼントの思想が現代にうったえてくるもの," in 暗黒大陸中国の真実, (Tokyo: Fuyo Shobo, 2007).
- Townsend, Ralph, Ways That Are Dark: The Truth About China (New York: Putnam, 1933).
- Townsend, Ralph, Asia Answers (New York: Putnam, 1936).
- Walker, Samuel, Presidents and Civil Liberties from Wilson to Obama: A Story of Poor Custodians (New York: Cambridge University Press, 2012).
