= K. L. Gauba =

Indian lawyer and politician (1899–1981)

- Born: 1899
- Died: 1981 (aged 81–82)
- Other names: Khalid Latif Gauba
- Occupations: lawyer, author, politician
- Father: Lala Harkishen Lal

K. L. Gauba (Urdu: کے ایل گابا, lived 1899-1981), also known as Kanhaiya Lal Gauba or Khalid Latif Gauba, was an Indian lawyer, writer, politician, and son of Lala Harkishen Lal. Born into a Hindu family, Gauba later converted to Islam and was elected to the Punjab Legislative Assembly by a Muslim constituency. He emigrated to India following partition and died in poverty.

== Life ==
K. L. Gauba was born on the day of Krishna Janmashtami in 1899 to prominent businessman Lala Harkishen Lal and his mother who was the daughter of police inspector Malik Amirchand. She passed a few years later in 1903. His childhood was filled with material luxury and exposure to Lahore's politics and high society due to his father's illustrious career and connections. Educated in upper class schools as well as English tutors, Gauba excelled at reading and writing from an early age, and published in Spink's Journal and Hindustan Review as a teenager. He studied law in England, where he was a member of the original Cambridge Majlis society.

He returned to practice law in the Lahore High Court. His civil marriage to a Muslim woman in 1923 raised both scandal and praise among newspapers and society. His conversion to Islam in 1933 is speculated to be related to his public differences with his father, however it was a major public event for Punjabi Muslims, with Mohammad Ali Bogra, Muhammad Iqbal, Feroze Khan Noon, Muhammad Zafarullah Khan and the Nawab of Mamdot in attendance. Hindu press reacted strongly against the conversion and politician Bhai Parmanand claimed that Gauba must be mentally ill. Gauba went on to represent Muslim clients in high profile cases, and in 1933 won a seat in the Indian Legislative Assembly in a highly contested election against a Muslim League candidate.

When his father was under judicial investigation and imprisoned by Chief Justice Douglas Young, Gauba wrote a book critical of the judge, titled Sir Douglas Young’s Magna Carta. He was found in contempt of the court and jailed. The book was never published, but copies circulated among political leaders in India and London, and Young was advised to resign his post. Despite winning public favor in the affair, Gauba suffered significant financial losses.

During the Partition of India, Gauba decided that his opposition to the Muslim League would compromise his political career in newly established Pakistan and moved to Mumbai, India to continue practicing law and writing. He returned to Pakistan for a month-long visit on invitation of Prime Minister Zulfikar Ali Bhutto in 1975. Following his death in Mumbai, Khushwant Singh wrote "Fifty years ago, K.L. Gauba’s cortege would have been followed by half the city of Lahore; last week he did not have a dozen to mourn his departure."

== Select Publications ==
Gauba's first novel, Uncle Sham, was written as a response to Katherine Mayo's Mother India, and particularly notable from contemporary responses for his choice to use parody rather than identify and counter Mayo's false claims. He borrowed Mayo's style to criticize American colonial practices and what he saw as a morally corrupt culture of promiscuous women. He was particularly alarmed by the birth control movement in the United States and mixed-race relationships, even as he criticized institutions of American racism. Having never visited the United States, he relied on sources sent by friends, including Chicago Commission on Race Relations and True Story (magazine). The book circulated worldwide, including translations and a temporary ban in the US. Gauba claimed that the bestseller was reprinted twenty times in the first year and he built a bungalow in Lahore with the profits.

His next bestseller, His Highness, gave scandalous descriptions of sex orgies involving Indian princes.

1. Uncle Sham, being the strange tale of a civilisation run amonk 1929
2. His Highness 1932
3. The Rebel Minister 1938
4. The Consequences of Pakistan 1946 (Gauba's argument against Partition)
5. Verdict on England 1946
6. Famous and Historic Trials 1946
7. Inside Pakistan 1948
8. Hyderabad or India 1948
9. Battles at the bar 1956
10. The Prophet of the Desert 1934 (biography of Muhammad)
11. Famous Trials for Love and Murder 1967
12. The Pakistani Spy and other famous trials 1968
13. The Assassination of Mahatma Gandhi 1969
14. The Shamim Rahmani case and other famous trials 1971
15. Meena Tandon's Honeymoon and other noted cases or marriage and divorce 1971
16. Famous and Historical Trials 1972
17. Passive Voices: A Penetrating Study of Muslims in India - study of the Muslim minority in India post-1947 1973
18. Friends and Foes (Auto biography) 1974
19. Women 1975
20. The Mystery of Nagarwala Case 1977
21. Pakistan Today 1977
22. Consequences of Pakistan Published 1946 Lion Press, Lahore

== Sources ==
- https://openlibrary.org/authors/OL2107A/Khalid_Latif_Gauba
