= Babubhai =

Babubhai is a given name. Notable people with the name include:

- Babubhai Bokhiria (born 1953), part of the Council of Ministers of Gujarat in 13th Gujarat Legislative Assembly of the Indian state of Gujarat
- Babubhai Maneklal Chinai, Indian politician
- Babubhai Desai, Member of Legislative assembly and a Best MLA Award Winner from Kankrej constituency in Gujarat for its 12th legislative assembly
- Babubhai Khimabhai Katara (born 1961), member of the 14th Lok Sabha of India until suspended
- Babubhai Mehta, writer of stories for Bollywood Hindi films
- Babubhai Mistry (1918–2010), Indian film director and special effects pioneer who is best known for his films based on Hindu mythology
- Babubhai J. Patel, the chief minister of Gujarat state in India
- Babubhai Patel (cricketer) (born 1911), Indian cricketer
- Babubhai Patel (politician), member of Gujarat Legislative Assembly from Daskroi constituency in Ahmedabad district of Gujarat
- Narendra Babubhai Patel, KT, FMedSci, FRSE (born 1938), British obstetrician, cross bench peer, former Chancellor of the University of Dundee
- Babubhai P. Vaidya (1909–1979), Indian freedom-fighter, author, journalist, and champion of human rights
- Vaja Babubhai, Member of Legislative Assembly representing the Mangrol assembly constituency in the Gujarat Legislative Assembly, India
