= Mother India =

1957 film directed by Mehboob Khan

- Film poster
- Directed by: Mehboob Khan
- Written by: Wajahat Mirza; S. Ali Raza
- Story by: Babubhai A. Mehta
- Based on: Aurat by Mehboob Khan
- Produced by: Mehboob Khan
- Starring: Nargis; Sunil Dutt; Rajendra Kumar; Raaj Kumar
- Cinematography: Faredoon A. Irani
- Edited by: Shamsudin Kadri
- Music by: Naushad
- Production company: Mehboob Productions
- Distributed by: Mehboob Productions (India); Columbia Pictures (US/UK)
- Release date: 25 October 1957 (India)
- Running time: 172 minutes
- Country: India
- Language: Hindi
- Budget: est. ₹6 million
- Box office: est. ₹80 million (India); 120–150 million tickets (worldwide)

Mother India is a 1957 Indian epic drama film, directed by Mehboob Khan and starring Nargis, Sunil Dutt, Rajendra Kumar and Raaj Kumar. A remake of Khan's earlier film Aurat (1940), it is the story of a poverty-stricken village woman named Radha (Nargis), who in the absence of her husband, struggles to raise her sons and survive against a cunning money-lender amidst many troubles.

The title of the film was chosen to counter American author Katherine Mayo's 1927 polemical book Mother India, which vilified Indian culture. Mother India metaphorically represents India as a nation in the aftermath of its independence in 1947, and alludes to a strong sense of Indian nationalism and nation-building. Allusions to Hindu mythology are abundant in the film, and its lead character has been seen as a metonymic representation of an Indian woman who reflects high moral values and the concept of what it means to be a mother to society through self-sacrifice. While some authors treat Radha as the symbol of women's empowerment, others see her cast in female stereotypes. The film was shot in Mumbai's Mehboob Studios and in the villages of Maharashtra, Gujarat, and Uttar Pradesh. The music by Naushad introduced global music, including Western classical music and the orchestra, to Hindi cinema.

The film was one of the most expensive Indian productions and earned the highest revenue for any Indian film at that time. Adjusted for inflation, Mother India still ranks among the all-time Indian box office hits. It was released in India amid fanfare in October 1957 and had several high-profile screenings, including one at the capital, New Delhi, attended by the country's president and prime minister. Mother India became a definitive cultural classic and is regarded as one of the best films in Indian cinema and is one of three Hindi-language films to be included on the list of 1001 Movies You Must See Before You Die. The film won the All India Certificate of Merit for Best Feature Film, and at the 1957 Filmfare Awards, it won the Best Film Award, and Nargis and Khan won the Best Actress and Best Director awards, respectively. It was also nominated for the Academy Award for Best International Feature Film, becoming the first Indian film to be nominated.

== Plot ==
In 1957, the construction of an irrigation canal to the village is completed. Radha, considered to be the "mother" of the village, is asked to inaugurate the canal. She reminisces about her past when she was newly married.

The wedding between Radha and Shamu is paid for by Radha's mother-in-law, who borrows money from the moneylender Sukhilala. The conditions of the loan are disputed, but the village elders decide in favour of the moneylender. Subsequently, Shamu and Radha are forced to pay three-quarters of their crop as interest on the loan of ₹500. (Note: valued at about US$105 in 1957.) (Note: The exchange rate in 1957 was 4.762 Indian rupees (₹) per 1 US dollar (US$).(Statistical Abstract of the United States 1959, p. 944)) (Note: The exact year when the loan was borrowed is not mentioned in the film, so the value is given in 1957 (year of release of the film) exchange rate.)

While Shamu works to bring more of their rocky land into use, his arms are crushed by a boulder. Ashamed of his helplessness (being without arms) and humiliated by Sukhilala for living on the earnings of his wife, Shamu decides that he is of no use to his family and permanently leaves Radha and their three sons, walking to his probable death by starvation. Soon after, Radha's youngest son and her mother-in-law die. A severe storm and the resulting flood destroy houses in the village and ruin the harvest. Sukhilala offers to save Radha and her sons if she trades her body to him for food. Radha vehemently refuses his offer but also loses her infant to the atrocities of the storm. Although the villagers initially begin to evacuate the village, they decide to stay and rebuild it, persuaded by Radha.

Several years later, Radha's two surviving children, Birju and Ramu, are young men. Birju, embittered since childhood by the demands of Sukhilala, takes out his frustrations by pestering the village girls, especially Sukhilala's daughter, Rupa. Ramu, by contrast, has a calmer temperament and is married soon after. Birju's anger finally becomes dangerous, and after being provoked, he attacks Sukhilala and his daughter, stealing Radha's kangan (marriage bracelets) that were pawned with Sukhilala. He is chased out of the village and becomes a bandit. Radha promises Sukhilala that she will not let Birju cause harm to Sukhilala's family. On Rupa's wedding day, Birju returns with his gang of bandits to exact his revenge. He kills Sukhilala and kidnaps Rupa. When he tries to flee the village on his horse, Radha, his mother, shoots him. He dies in her arms. In 1957, Radha opens the gate of the canal, and its reddish water flows into the fields.

== Cast ==
- Nargis as Radha, the heroine and an archetypal Indian woman
- Sunil Dutt as Birju, Radha's rebellious younger son, who turns into a bandit
  - Master Sajid as young Birju
- Rajendra Kumar as Ramu, Radha's righteous elder son, who follows his mother's path of virtue
  - Master Surendra as young Ramu
- Raaj Kumar as Shamu, Radha's husband
- Kanhaiya Lal as Sukhilala "Lala" Baniya, a cunning money-lender
- Jilloo Maa as Sundar, the mother-in-law of Radha
- Kumkum as Champa, Ramu's wife
- Chanchal as Rupa Jaiswal, Sukhilala's daughter
- Sheela Naik as Kamala, a family friend
- Muqri as Shambu Jaiswal, a family friend and Kamala's husband
- Sitaradevi as Holi Dancer
- Azra as Chandra Shekhar, daughter of a schoolmaster of the village

Supported by

- Siddiqui, Ram Shastri, Faqir Mohomed, Geeta, Hameeda, Mastan, Nawab Khan and Master Alec

== Production ==
=== Title ===
The title Mother India was inspired by American author Katherine Mayo's 1927 polemical book of the same name, in which she attacked Indian society, religion and culture. Written against the Indian demands for self-rule and independence from British rule, the book pointed to the treatment of India's women, the untouchables, animals, dirt, and the character of its nationalistic politicians. Mayo singled out what she thought to be the rampant and fatally weakening sexuality of its males to be at the core of all problems, allegedly leading to masturbation, rape, homosexuality, prostitution, venereal diseases, and, particularly, premature sexual intercourse and maternity. The book created an outrage across India, and it was burned along with her effigy. It was criticised by Mahatma Gandhi as a "report of a drain inspector sent out with the one purpose of opening and examining the drains of the country to be reported upon". The book prompted over fifty angry books and pamphlets to be published to highlight Mayo's errors and false perception of Indian society, which had become a powerful influence on the American people's view of India.

Mehboob Khan had the idea for the film and the title as early as 1952, five years after India's independence; in October that year, he approached the import authorities of the Indian government to seek permission for importing raw stocks for the film. (Note: At that time (early 1950s) the Joint Chief Controller of Imports, Government of India, regulated import of film stocks. The maximum number of prints for a film in those days were usually around 60. However, Mehboob applied for the permission to import stocks needed for 180 prints. As a result, a prolonged negotiation between the import authorities and Mehboob Production ensued. The data on the exact import amount is not available.) In 1955, the ministries of External Affairs and Information-and-Broadcasting learned of the title of the forthcoming film and demanded that the director send them the script for review, suspicious that it was based on the book and thus a possible threat to the national interest. The film team dispatched the script along with a two-page letter on 17 September 1955 saying:

There has been considerable confusion and misunderstanding in regard to our film production Mother India and Mayo's book. Not only are the two incompatible but totally different and indeed opposite. We have intentionally called our film Mother India, as a challenge to this book, in an attempt to evict from the minds of the people the scurrilous work that is Miss Mayo's book.

=== Script ===
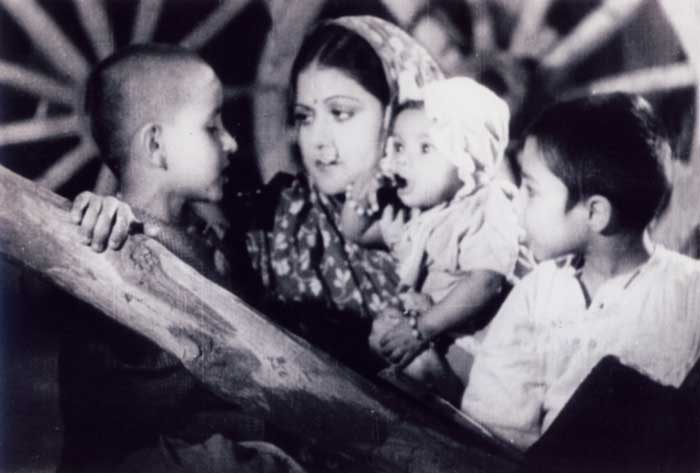
The 1940 film Aurat (Woman) was remade as Mother India. Khan's future wife Sardar Akhtar played Radha in Aurat.

Khan was inspired by American author Pearl S. Buck and her books The Good Earth (1931) and The Mother (1934); he also saw the film The Good Earth (1937), directed by Sidney Franklin. The Mother chronicled the life of a Chinese woman, including her married life and lonely struggle after being abandoned by her husband. Aspects of Mother India, such as moneylenders, toiling on land, and rearing children through hardship were part of the story. Khan originally drew upon these influences in making his 1940 film Aurat, the original version of Mother India. Khan bought the rights of Aurat from the production company National Studios for ₹35,000 (valued at about US$7,350 in 1957). Stylistic elements of Mother India show similarities with Vsevolod Pudovkin's Soviet silent film Mother (1926); Our Daily Bread (1934), directed by King Vidor; and films of Alexander Dovzhenko. Certain imagery in the film, such as "happy farmers, sickles in their hand, smiling from behind ripening crops", resemble posters by Soviet constructivist artists.

The script of Aurat was devised by Wajahat Mirza, based upon a story by Babubhai Mehta. For Mother India, it was reworked by Mirza and the young screenwriter S. Ali Raza. Apart from Mehboob Khan, Mirza and Raza, prominent screenwriters Aghajani Kashmeri, Zia Sarhadi, Akhtar Mirza, music director Naushad, assistant director Chimankant Desai and many others were consulted. The dialogue, reworked by Mirza and Raza, is in vernacular Hindi, and its literary counterpart. As Mirza and Raza were from the Urdu literary tradition, they wrote the dialogues in Urdu script.

The script was intentionally written in a way that promoted the empowerment of women in Indian society (including the power to resist sexual advances) and the maintenance of a sense of moral dignity and purpose as individuals; this was contrary to what Mayo had claimed in her book. These themes, present in Aurat, were further developed with a strong sense of nationalism and nation-building, using characters personifying abstract qualities such as "beauty and goodness, wealth and power, poverty and exploitation, and community spirit".

=== Casting ===
Nargis was the director's first choice for the role of Radha, and despite only being aged 26 at the time, she played the new wife, young single mother and an aged mother of two sons. Nargis—the reigning queen of Hindi cinema at the time—had started her career in a leading role with Khan's Taqdeer (1943) and acted under his direction in Humayun (1945) and Andaz (1949). Mother India is generally regarded as Nargis's best performance and was her last major film before retirement after marriage.

Khan had wanted to cast Sabu Dastagir, a Hollywood star of Indian origin, as Birju. Dastagir travelled to India from Los Angeles, stayed in a hotel in Mumbai (then known as Bombay) and received a retainer. However, delays and obstacles in beginning shooting and getting a work permit for Dastagir led to his dismissal from the project. Dilip Kumar, an established actor in the Hindi film industry, had originally expressed an interest in playing Birju, which Khan found agreeable; Dilip Kumar agreed to play Shamu as well. However, Nargis objected that the public would not accept their casting as mother and son because she had done several romantic films alongside him. Sunil Dutt—with the experience of just one film—was finally cast, after Mukri, a comedian in the film, introduced him to Khan. Sajid Khan, the actor who portrayed the young Birju, was unknown at the time and was from a poor family from the Mumbai slums. Sajid's salary in the film was ₹750. He was later adopted by Mehboob Khan. Subsequently, Raaj Kumar was cast as Shamu and Rajendra Kumar as Ramu. Mother India was the first successful film and a turning point in the careers of Sunil Dutt, Raaj Kumar and Rajendra Kumar.

Before principal photography began, Nargis and Raaj Kumar familiarised themselves with farming practices such as ploughing the fields, reaping and sowing, and cotton picking. The extras in the song and dance sequences of the film were from local dance groups in villages where the shooting took place instead of the usual ones from Mumbai.

=== Filming ===
The initial filming for Mother India began unexpectedly, even before the script and cast were finalised. In 1955, parts of Uttar Pradesh suffered from major flooding. Cinematographer Faredoon Irani travelled to flood-afflicted districts to shoot generic flood scenes. The scheduled principal photography started in 1955 with a budget of ₹25 lakh (approximately $525,000 in 1957). However, the budget increased by ₹35 lakh to ₹60 lakh (approximately $1.3 million in 1957) by the end of the filming because of the outdoor sessions and cast and crew's salaries.

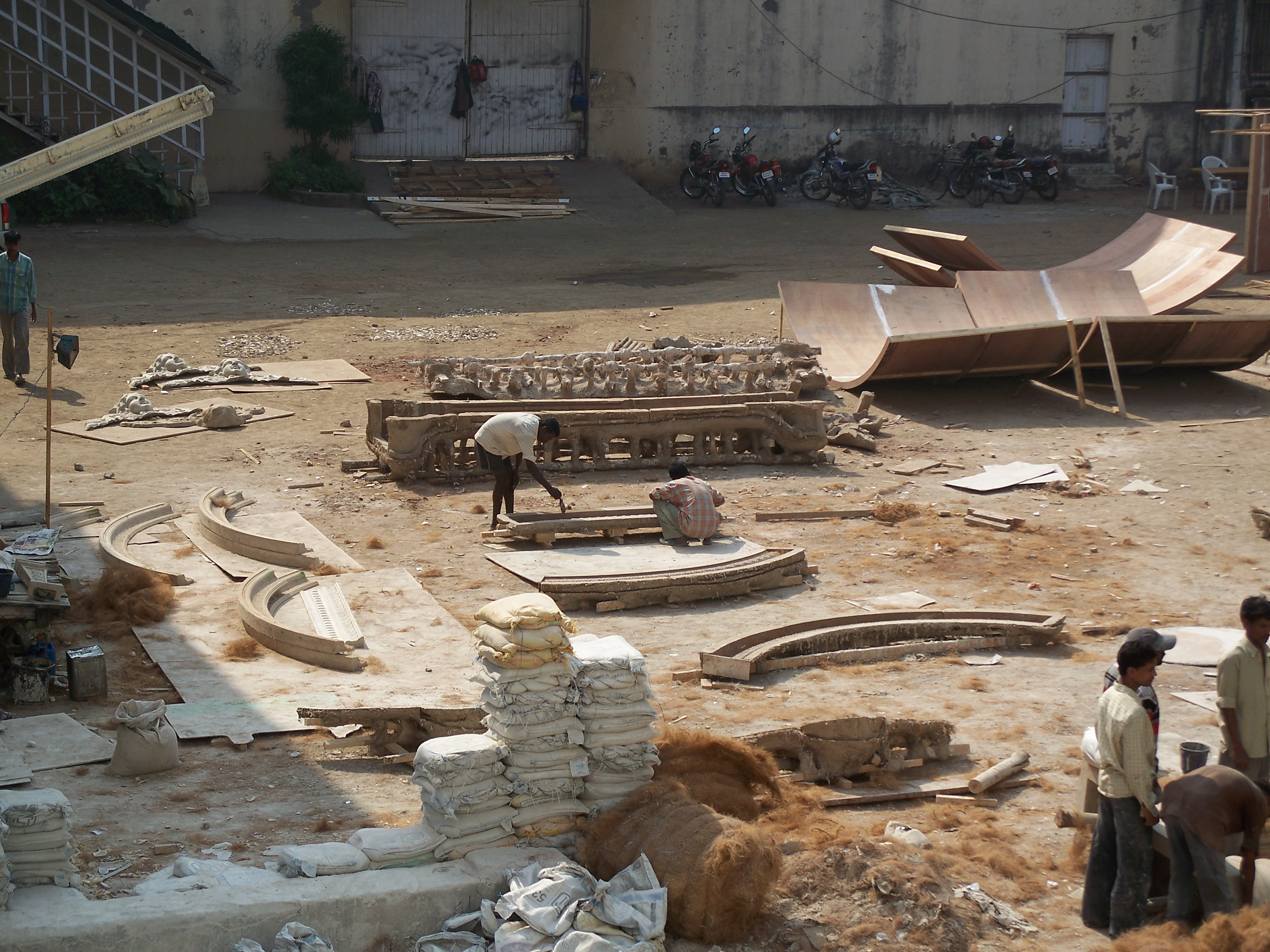
Mehboob Studios in Mumbai (in 2006), where most of the indoor shots of the film were taken.

Several indoor scenes for the film were shot in 1956 at Mehboob Studios in Bandra, Mumbai. Khan and Irani attempted to shoot frequently on location to make the film as realistic as possible. Locations included various villages in Maharashtra, Gujarat (Maharashtra and Gujarat together formed Bombay State then) and Uttar Pradesh. The film was shot in 35mm. Contemporary cinematographer Anil Mehta has noted the mastery of Irani's cinematic techniques in shooting the film, including his "intricate tracks and pans, the detailed mise en scène patterns Irani conceived, even for brief shots—in the studios as well as on location". The film took about three years to make, from early organisation, planning, and scripting to completion of filming. In a November 1956 interview, Nargis described the film shoot and her role as the most demanding of her career. Mother India was shot in Gevacolor, later converted to Technicolor. It was shot mostly using the sync sound technique, which was common at the time; some scenes were dubbed.

For shooting the flood scene, a farmer agreed to flood 500 acres (200 ha) of his land. In the exodus scene following the flood, 300 bullock carts, 200 farmers and many horses, tractors and ploughs were used. Gayatri Chatterjee writes about the popular belief that all these were made available by villagers without reimbursement, in her book. However, account ledgers of the production revealed that the villagers were paid. There was a protracted scene in the film in which Radha runs between burning haystacks in search for her son Birju, a renegade bandit, who was hiding there. The fire scene was shot in the Umra area of Surat, Gujarat, by burning bales of hay. Nargis and Dutt acted in the fire scene without doubles. On 1 March 1957, an accident occurred during the fire scene when the wind direction changed and the fire grew out of control, trapping Nargis. She was saved by Dutt, who quickly grabbed a blanket, plunged inside, and rescued her. Shooting halted temporarily as both had sustained injuries. Dutt was hospitalised for the burns and Nargis helped nurse him, at Khan's place in Billimora. Nargis—a popular actress at the time—fell in love with Dutt, who was in early stages of his film career and played her son in the film; they married on 11 March 1958. Nargis wished to marry soon after the film, but Khan protested that real-life marriage of the onscreen mother-son would be disastrous for the film. Owing to their relationship, Nargis also found it difficult to perform a scene where she beat Dutt with a lathi.

== Themes ==
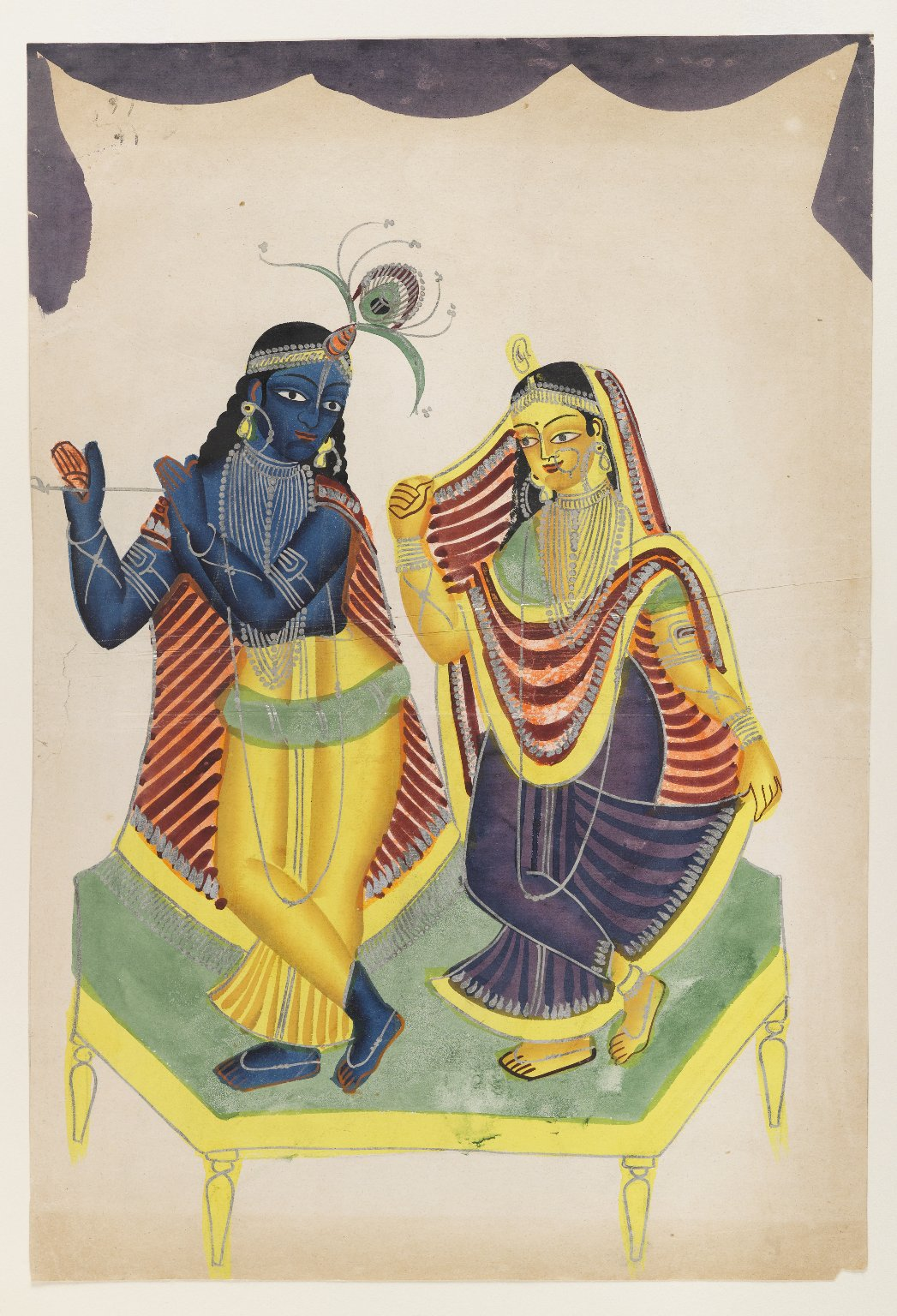
In Hindu mythology, Radha is the lover of the god Krishna. Scholars have noted that the character Radha in the film personifies the love and romance of mythological Radha.

Various authors identify the character of Radha with Hindu mythological goddesses and characters, such as Radha (the lover of the god Krishna, personifying love and romance), Sita (the divine heroine of the Hindu epic Ramayana, personifying high moral value), Savitri (representing great morality and loyalty to husband), Draupadi (personifying duty and morality), Dharti-mata (earth-mother goddess) and Lakshmi (Hindu goddess of prosperity). Besides these gentle goddesses, the character of Radha has shades of more ferocious warrior goddesses such as Durga and Kali. Film scholars have compared the mild-mannered, obedient son Ramu with the god Rama of the epic Ramayana, and the romantic outlaw Birju—a name of Krishna—with the god Krishna, known for his transgressions. Shamu (another name of Krishna), Radha's husband who leaves her, is also equated with Krishna, who left his lover Radha in mythological accounts. The title Mother India and Radha's character are described to be allusions not only to the Hindu Mother Goddess, but also to Bharat Mata (literally "Mother India"), the national personification of India, generally represented as a Hindu goddess. (Note: The idea of the nation as mother (Bharat Mata, or Mother India) was prevalent in pre-independence India, and was an important trope for nationalism and Indian independence movement. Representation of the nation as mother were evident in paintings, literature, music and commodities such as calendars.(Chatterjee 2002, p. 49))

According to professor Nalini Natarajan of the University of Puerto Rico, Nargis's Mother India is a metonymic representation of a Hindu woman, reflecting high Hindu values, with virtuous morality and motherly self-sacrifice. Film scholar Jyotika Virdi wrote that Mother India could also be seen as a metaphor of the trinity of mother, God, and a dynamic nation. Vijay Mishra, in his 2002 book Bollywood Cinema: Temples of Desire, opined that the Mother India figure is an icon in several respects—being associated with a goddess, her function as a wife, as a lover, and even compromising her femininity at the end of the film by playing Vishnu the Preserver and Shiva the Destroyer, masculine gods.

According to Indian film scholars Gokulsing and Dissanayake, while aspiring to traditional Hindu values, the character of Mother India also represents the changing role of the mother in Indian cinema and society in that the mother is not always subservient or dependent on her husband, refining the relationship to the male gender or patriarchal social structures. The New Internationalist said in a 1999 review that Radha transforms from a submissive wife to an independent mother, thereby breaking female stereotypes in Hindi film. In contrast, in a 2012 article in the newspaper The Hindu, author Tarini Sridharan has pointed out themes such as upholding female chastity, wifely devotion and saintly motherhood that reinforce gender stereotypes. While the action of sacrificing motherhood to uphold a woman's dignity is termed as feminist by some, other authors see it as an attempt of a community woman to protect the patriarchal village structure, that esteems izzat (honour) of women. A promotional pamphlet to introduce the social context of the film to western audiences described Indian women as being "an altar in India", and that Indians "measure the virtue of their race by the chastity of their women", and that "Indian mothers are the nucleus around which revolve the tradition and culture of ages."

In a 2002 review in The New York Times, film critic Dave Kehr compares the film with Stella Dallas (1937) for the thematic similarity of the series of sacrifices made by the female lead, and with Gone with the Wind (1939) as an epic mirroring social upheavals. Film critic Mark Cousins and author Tejaswini Ganti agree that the film is the Gone with the Wind of Indian cinema.

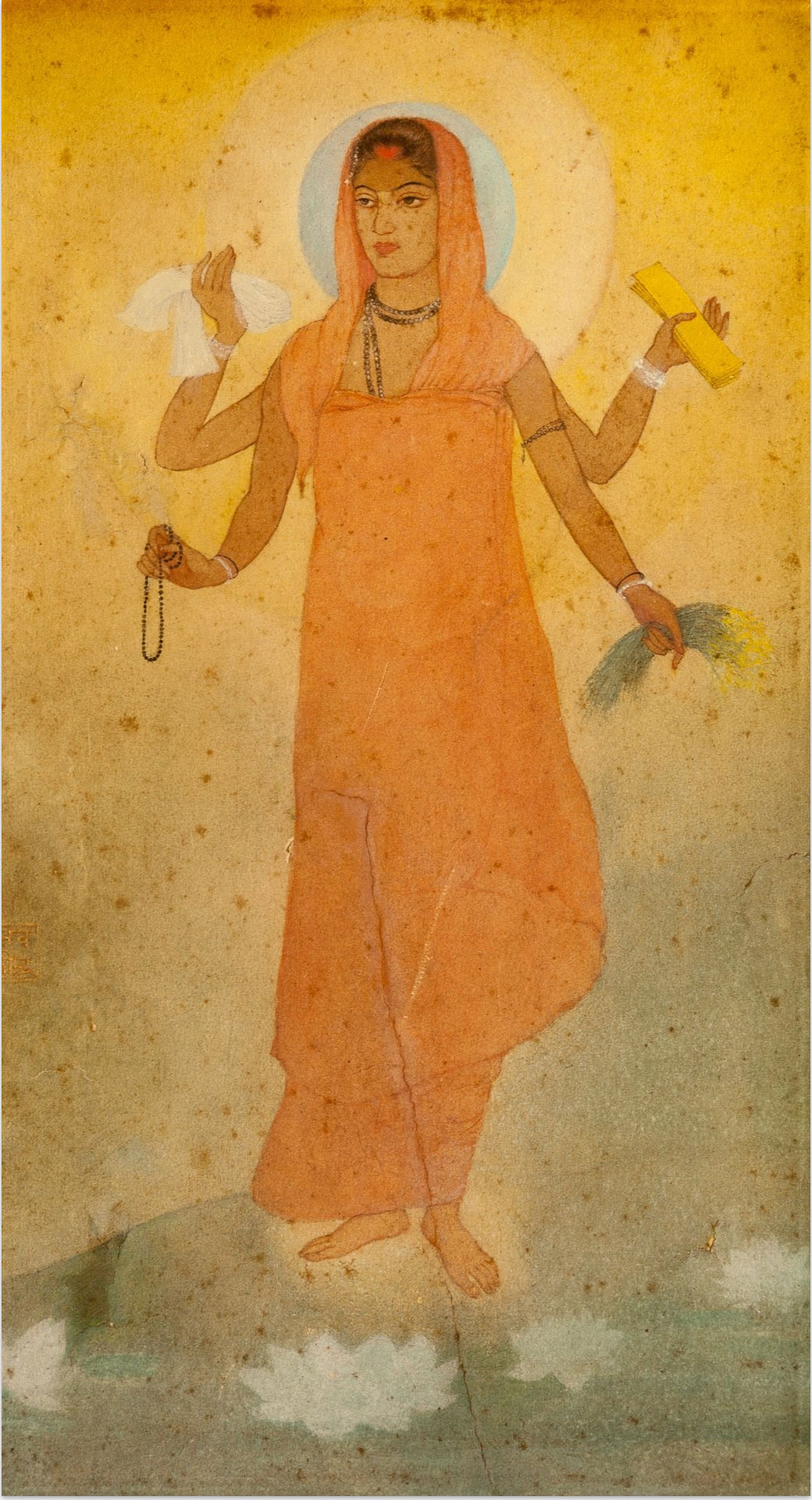
Bharat Mata (literally "Mother India"), the national personification of India. Scholars have noted allusions to this goddess in the protagonist Radha and in the film Mother India, which is interpreted as an allegorical representation of India after independence.

The term "Mother India" has been defined as "a common icon for the emergent Indian nation in the early 20th century in both colonialist and nationalist discourse". Many authors, including Gayatri Chatterjee, author of Mother India (2002), interpret the film as an allegory signifying patriotism and the changing situation in the newly independent nation, and how India was functioning without British authority. It echoes the tale of a modern India, liberating itself from "feudal and colonial oppression". The film, an archetypal nationalistic picture, is symbolic in that it demonstrated the euphoria of "Mother India" in a nation that had only been independent for 10 years, and it had a long-lasting cultural impact upon the Indian people. Film scholar Saibal Chatterjee considers Mother India a "mirror of independent India", highlighting problems of a nascent nation, including rural exploitation of farmers by money-lenders, in a dramatic fashion understandable to the common viewer. It also represents the agrarian poverty and hardship of the people at the time. The red water that flows from the canal irrigating the green fields at the end of the film is seen by Chatterjee as a metaphor to represent the blood of Indians in the struggle for independence, flowing to nourish a new free India. The canal is described by Virdi to signal the imminent end of the feudal order. However, despite Radha's struggle against feudal oppression depicted in the film, her action of stopping the rebellious Birju and upholding status quo—the feudal and patriarchal order—is seen as "regressive" by various authors.

In a study of media and popular culture in South Asia, author Mahasveta Barua draws a parallel between the film's metaphorical representation of the mother as a nation, and the metonymic identification with India that Indira Gandhi, India's only woman prime minister, sought and tried for during her tenure (1966–77, and 1980–84). In his book Terrorism, Media, Liberation, John David Slocum argues that like Satyajit Ray's classic masterpiece Pather Panchali (1955), Khan's Mother India has "vied for alternative definitions of Indianness". However, he emphasises that the film is an overt mythologising and feminising of the nation in which Indian audiences have used their imagination to define it in the nationalistic context, given that in reality, the storyline is about a poverty-stricken peasant from northern India, rather than a true idea of a modernising, powerful nation.

The Radha–Birju relationship is described to have "Oedipal elements" by many authors; Virdi has argued that in her chastity, Radha channels her sexual desires into maternal love for her sons who effectively become "substitute erotic subjects". Mishra opines that the crushing of the arms of Radha's husband and the mellowness of the older son symbolise castration, which is in contrast with the rebellion of Birju, identified with sexual potency. Birju's obsession with his mother's bracelets is an expression of his oedipal longings, according to Chakravarty. Rachel Dwyer, Professor of Indian Cultures and Cinema at SOAS, describes how "suspiciously smoothly" the Oedipal elements fit into the film and the off-screen romance between Nargis and Dutt, playing mother and son in the film. Radha's actions at the end of the film in shooting her own son was a breaking of traditional mother-son relationship to safeguard morality, according to author William Van der Heide. Virdi points out that this brought ambiguity to the mother figure who acts as a sacrificing provider and also as a destroyer, annihilating her own son, something rare in Hindi cinema. She interprets Birju's sexual advances on a village girl (which is incest in north Indian village culture (Note: Jyotika Virdi writes, "In north Indian village culture men and women of the same village are conventionally considered siblings."(Virdi 2003, p. 117))) as being a substitute in the plot for the incestuous mother-son relationship and his death at the end as a punishment for violation of the taboo.

Authors such as Eshun and Woods state that Radha and Ramu are the archetypal champions of virtue in battling hardship and injustice, while Birju is a mischievous child who becomes the anarchist whose uncontrollable rebellion destroys order. Mishra has noted that although Radha upholds Dharma (the natural law or order) in the film, it is Birju who achieves identification from the spectators; in his rebellion lies the agenda of political action that will usher social change. Mishra notes that due to such conflicting ideas, the film is very much conforming, and yet "defiantly subversive".

Film scholar Vijay Mishra has pointed out the presence of the "highly syncretic hyphenated Hindu–Muslim nature" of Hindi film industry in the film. Parama Roy has interpreted that Nargis's legendary status as the titular Mother India is due to Hinduisation of the role and her real-life marriage with a Hindu; she is, according to Roy, scripted as a renouncer of Muslim separatism in the film. Mishra has found metacritical value in Salman Rushdie's commentary on the film in his novel The Moor's Last Sigh (1995) in which Rushdie describes:

In Mother India, a piece of Hindu myth-making directed by a Muslim socialist, Mehboob Khan, the Indian peasant women is idealised as a bride, mother, and producers of sons, as long-suffering, stoical, loving, redemptive, and conservatively wedded to the maintenance of the social status quo. But for Bad Birju, cast out from his mother's love, she becomes, as one critic mentioned, 'that image of an aggressive, treacherous, annihilating mother who haunts the fantasy of Indian males'.

== Music ==
Mother India

Soundtrack album by Naushad
- Released: 25 October 1957
- Recorded: Mehboob Studios
- Genre: Film soundtrack
- Label: EMI

Naushad chronology
Uran Khatola (1955)	Mother India (1957)	Sohni Mahiwal (1958)

The score and soundtrack for Mother India were composed by Naushad. Mehboob Khan had worked on eight films with Naushad and developed a rapport with him. The lyrics were by Shakeel Badayuni. The soundtrack consists of 12 songs and features vocals by Mohammed Rafi, Shamshad Begum, Lata Mangeshkar, and Manna Dey. It was not particularly well-received upon release, and critics said it did not match the high pitch and quality of the film. However, its later reception has been more positive: the soundtrack made Planet Bollywood's list of "100 Greatest Bollywood Soundtracks Ever", compiled in the 2000s. The review gave the album 7.5 stars out of 10.

Mother India is the earliest example of a Hindi film containing Western classical music and Hollywood-style orchestra. An example is a coda during the scene in which Birju runs away from his mother and rejects her. It features a powerful symphonic orchestra with strings, woodwinds and trumpets. This orchestral music contains extensive chromaticism, diminished sevenths, and augmented scales. It also features violin tremolos. Anne Morcom writes in Hindi Film Songs and the Cinema that the piece is unmelodic and "profoundly disturbing". This use of a western-style orchestra in Indian cinema influenced many later films, such as Mughal-e-Azam (1960), which features similar dissonant orchestral music to create the atmosphere at tense moments. The song "Holi Aayi Re Kanhai", sung by Shamshad Begum, and dance by Sitaradevi has been cited as a typical Hindi film song which is written for and sung by a female singer, with an emotional charge that appeals to a mass audience.

No.	Title	Singer(s)	Length
1.	"Chundariya Katati Jaye (Raga Khamaj)"	Manna Dey	3:15
2.	"Nagari Nagari Dware Dware"	Lata Mangeshkar	7:29
3.	"Duniya Mein Hum Aaye Hain (Raga Shivaranjani)"	Lata Mangeshkar, Meena Mangeshkar, Usha Mangeshkar	3:36
4.	"O Gaadiwale"	Shamshad Begum, Mohammed Rafi	2:59
5.	"Matwala Jiya Dole Piya (Raga Sarang)"	Lata Mangeshkar, Mohammed Rafi	3:34
6.	"Dukh Bhare Din Beete Re (Raga Megh Malhar)"	Shamshad Begum, Mohammed Rafi, Manna Dey, Asha Bhosle	3:09
7.	"Holi Aayi Re Kanhai"	Shamshad Begum	2:51
8.	"Pi Ke Ghar Aaj Pyari Dulhaniya Chali (Raga Pilu)"	Shamshad Begum	3:19
9.	"Ghunghat Nahin Kholoongi Saiyan"	Lata Mangeshkar	3:10
10.	"O Mere Lal Aaja (Raga Bhairavi)"	Lata Mangeshkar	3:11
11.	"O Janewalo Jao Na"	Lata Mangeshkar	2:33
12.	"Na Main Bhagwan Hoon"	Mohammed Rafi	3:24
Total length:			42:30

== Reception ==
=== Release and box office ===
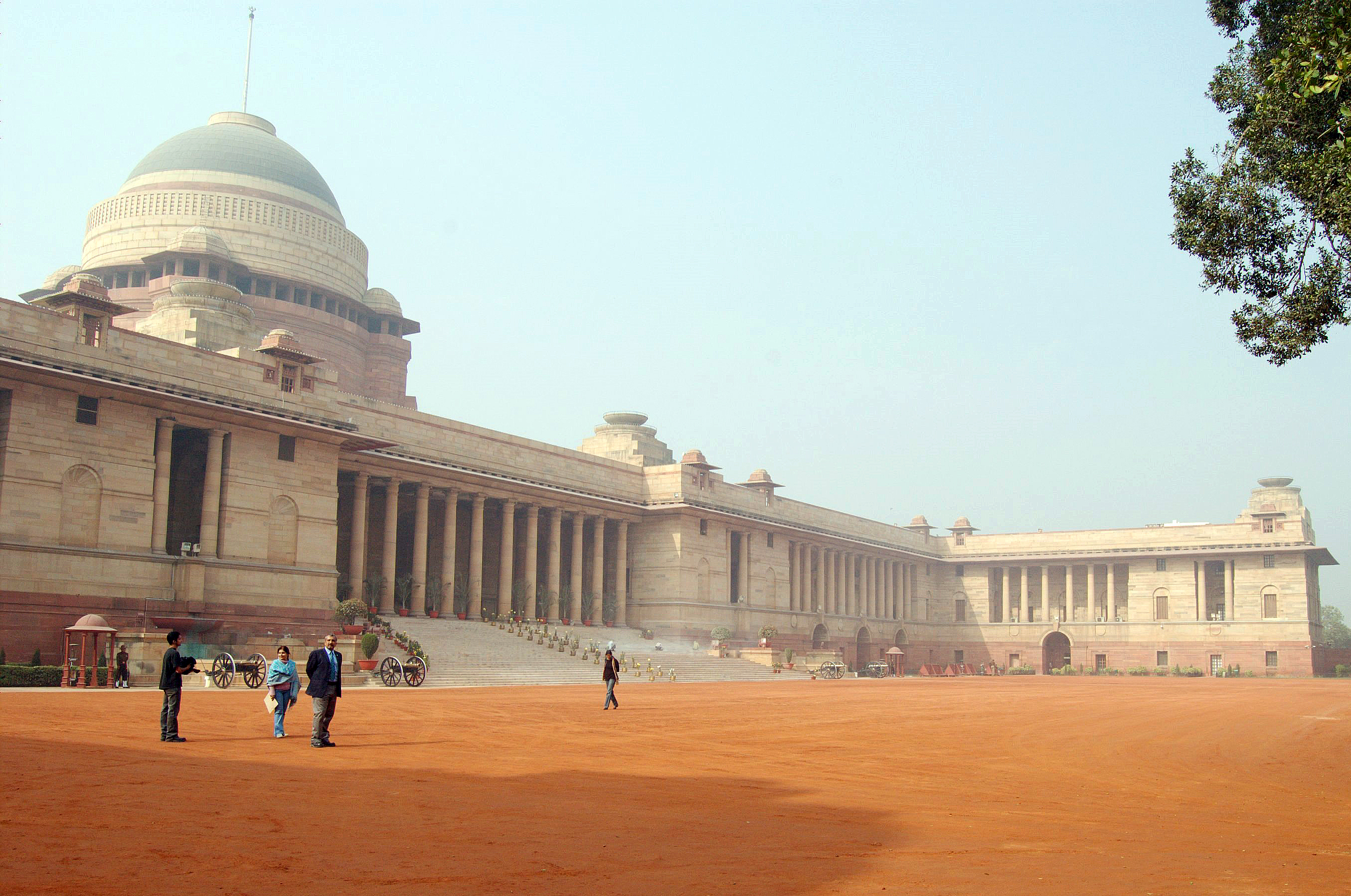
A special screening of Mother India was held in the residence of the Indian president (pictured) on 23 October 1957, two days before its release.

The production team had planned to release Mother India to commemorate the tenth anniversary of India's independence on 15 August 1957, but the film was released over two months later. (Note: Possible reason for the delayed release is lengthy post-production. Chatterjee mentions that the director undertook "tremendous effort to bring the film to the release print stage as quickly as possible and dispatch it to the Technicolor office in London. Mehboob then proceeded to London for the final editing and colour correction, and Irani accompanied him for sound editing."(Chatterjee 2002, p. 21)) It premiered at the Liberty Cinema in Mumbai on 25 October 1957, during Diwali; it ran continuously at Liberty for over a year. It was released in Kolkata (then called Calcutta) the same day and in Delhi a week later. It had reached all regions of India by the end of November. Government ministers and other officials were invited to the premieres, and a special screening was held in Rashtrapati Bhavan (the presidential quarter) in New Delhi on 23 October 1957; the event was attended by President Rajendra Prasad, Prime Minister Jawaharlal Nehru and his daughter Indira Gandhi. Chief Minister of West Bengal Bidhan Chandra Roy and Governor Padmaja Naidu attended a screening in Kolkata. Impressed with the film's nationalistic message, Chief Minister of Bombay State Morarji Desai granted it an exemption from the entertainment tax in the state.

No reliable data is available on the box office earnings of Mother India. It was in continuous distribution in theatres in India until the mid-1990s. There was a renewed interest in the film in the 1970s causing an upsurge in ticket sales. According to Chatterjee, it did exceptionally good business in Delhi, Uttar Pradesh, Gujarat, Karnataka (then called Mysore State) and Maharashtra. Film trade websites provide estimates of its business. Box Office India gave the film's net collection as ₹40 million and its gross as ₹80 million, the highest for an Indian film up until Mughal-e-Azam (1960), while estimating that Mother India's inflation-adjusted net would be equivalent to ₹1.173 billion in January 2008. Box Office India later estimated in 2017 that Mother India had over 100 million footfalls at the domestic box office, making it one of the highest-grossing Indian films of all time when adjusted for inflation. In 2024, DNA India estimated footfalls between 120 million and 150 million tickets sold worldwide. The film's success led Khan to name his next film Son of India. Released in 1962, it was not well received.

Mother India was dubbed in several European languages including Spanish, French and Russian; it did substantial business in Greece, Spain and Russia and was released in the Eastern Bloc countries. Technicolor arranged one screening of the film in Paris on 30 June 1958, under the name Les bracelets d'or ("The Gold Bracelets"). It did minimal business in Paris, but fared better in French colonies. It was successful in the Latin American countries of Peru, Bolivia, and Ecuador. Mother India was also acclaimed across the Arab world, in the Middle East, parts of Southeast Asia, and North Africa and continued to be shown in countries such as Algeria at least ten years after its release. It was released in the US on 9 July 1959 to lukewarm response, and the UK release in 1961 was also a commercial failure. The initial international version with English subtitles was 40 minutes shorter than the Indian release.

As of 2013, Mother India is available on DVD in all regions NTSC format, distributed by the Eros Entertainment.

=== Reviews ===
A contemporary review in Filmfare praised the cast's enthusiastic performances and said that the film "will be remembered for a long time to come". Baburao Patel of Filmindia (December 1957) described Mother India after its release as "the greatest picture produced in India" and wrote that no other actress would have been able to perform the role as well as Nargis. A review in a British magazine Monthly Film Bulletin in 1958 remarked that audiences in UK should be grateful that the international version was shortened by 40 minutes, and termed it a "rag-bag pantomime". After its US release in 1959, Irene Thirer reviewed the film in the New York Post in which she praised its "striking dramatic appeal", but feared it might not be accepted by American audiences due to cultural differences. In a 1976 article in the journal Studies: An Irish Quarterly Review, author Michael Gallagher found the film "an amazing mixture of political allegory and cheap musical, a cross between the impressiveness of Eisenstein and the banality of Show Boat". The New Internationalist in 1999 found Nargis's acting "exemplary", and noted "a clever interplay—artistically and politically—between the traditional and the radical" evident in Mother India.

On the review aggregator website Rotten Tomatoes, 82% of 11 critics' reviews are positive, with an average rating of 6.7/10.

In a 2002 article in The Village Voice, film critic J. Hoberman described the film as "an outrageous masala of apparently discordant elements." He characterised it as a mixture of "indigenous versions of Soviet-style tractor-opera, Italian neo-realism, Hollywood kiddie-cuteness, a dozen Technicolor musical numbers, and, most significantly, a metaphoric overlay of pop Hinduism." Hoberman criticised the acting as "broad", and also wrote about the "vaguely left-wing" nationalist overtone of the film. Phill Hall, writing for Film Threat in 2002, described the film as exceptionally sluggish and one-dimensional, and lampooned it saying "it takes the strongest of constitutions to endure this film without entertaining notions of matricide." Jonathan Romney of The Independent observed the earth-mother Radha as "India's answer to Anna Magnani" and the film as "an all-out exercise in ideological myth-making." Women's Feature Service, in a 2007 article, noted Mother India as "one of the most outstanding films of the post-Independence era." Ziya Us Salam of The Hindu wrote in 2010: "Mehboob was able to blend the individual with the universal, thereby enhancing the film's appeal without compromising on its sensitivity."

== Awards ==
Mother India, Nargis, and Mehboob Khan received many awards and nominations. Nargis won the Filmfare Best Actress Award in 1958 and became the first Indian to receive the Best Actress award at the Karlovy Vary International Film Festival in present-day Czech Republic. Mother India won the Filmfare Award for Best Film and scooped several other Filmfare awards including Best Director for Khan, Best Cinematographer for Faredoon Irani, and Best Sound for R. Kaushik. In 1958, the film became India's first submission for the Academy Award for Best Foreign Language Film and was chosen as one of the five nominations for the category. (Note: The other nominations were the West German film The Devil Strikes at Night (director Robert Siodmak), the French-Italian Gates of Paris (director René Clair), the Italian Nights of Cabiria (director Federico Fellini) and the Norwegian Nine Lives (director Jan Baalsrud).(Chatterjee 2002, p. 79)) The international version, 120 minutes long, was sent for the Oscars. Additionally, this version had English subtitles, and dropped Mehboob Productions' logo, which featured the Communist hammer and sickle, to appease the academy. The 120-minute version was later distributed in the US and UK by Columbia Pictures. The film came close to winning the Academy Award but lost to Federico Fellini's Nights of Cabiria by a single vote. Khan was utterly disappointed at not winning the award. "He had seen the other films in the fray and believed Mother India was far superior to them" recalled Sunil Dutt decades later. It also won two awards at the 5th National Film Awards in 1957: an All India Certificate of Merit for Best Feature Film and Certificate of Merit for Best Feature Film in Hindi.

Award	Category	Nominee	Outcome
11th Karlovy Vary International Film Festival	Best Actress	Nargis	Won
30th Academy Awards	Best Foreign Language Film	Mehboob Khan	Nominated
5th National Film Awards	Best Feature Film in Hindi	Mehboob Khan	Won
5th Filmfare Awards	Best Film	Mehboob Khan	Won
5th Filmfare Awards	Best Director	Mehboob Khan	Won
5th Filmfare Awards	Best Actress	Nargis	Won
5th Filmfare Awards	Best Cinematography	Faredoon Irani	Won
5th Filmfare Awards	Best Sound Design	R.Kaushik	Won

== Legacy ==
All Hindi films come from Mother India.

— Javed Akhtar, Hindi cinema poet, lyricist and scriptwriter

Mother India has been described as "perhaps India's most revered film", a "cinematic epic", a "flag-bearer of Hindi cinema and a legend in its own right", Mehboob Khan's magnum opus and an "all-time blockbuster", which ranks highly among India's most successful films. It was in continuous distribution, being played in theatres for more than three decades; the record ended in the mid-1990s with the advent of satellite television and a change in Indian film-viewing habits. Mother India belongs to only a small collection of films, including Kismet (1943), Mughal-e-Azam (1960), Sholay (1975) Hum Aapke Hain Koun..! (1994), and Dilwale Dulhania Le Jayenge (1995) which are repeatedly watched throughout India and are viewed as definitive Hindi films with cultural significance. It is also among the only three Indian films to be nominated for the Academy Award for Best Foreign Language Film (the others being Salaam Bombay! and Lagaan). The Hindustan Times (in 2007) identifies the "film's pungent social references" which are "too harsh to be sold at a profit today. But this heartrending tale filled Indians with hope and pride then." The film was remade in the Telugu language as Bangaru Talli in 1971, in Turkish as Toprak Ana in 1973 and in Tamil as Punniya Boomi in 1978.

Mother India is ranked No. 80 in Empire magazine's "The 100 Best Films of World Cinema" in 2010. It is listed among the only three Hindi films in the book 1001 Movies You Must See Before You Die (the others being Dilwale Dulhania Le Jayenge and Deewaar). Film critic Anupama Chopra included it in her list of top 100 films in world cinema. In 2005, Indiatimes Movies ranked the film amongst the "Top 25 Must See Bollywood Films". It was ranked third in the British Film Institute's 2002 poll of "Top 10 Indian Films". It was also included in TIME's list of the best Bollywood classics in 2010, and in CNN-IBN's list of the "100 greatest Indian films of all time" in 2013. The film was premiered in the Cannes Classics section of the 2004 Cannes Film Festival.

Rajeev Masand of CNN-IBN notes that Mother India "didn't just put India on the world map, it also defined Hindi cinema for decades that followed." Film critic Dave Kehr agrees that it influenced Indian films for the next 50 years. A 1983 Channel 4 documentary on Hindi cinema describes the film as setting a benchmark in Indian cinema. The shooting stance of Nargis at the end of the film is one of the all-time iconic images of Hindi cinema. Other iconic scenes include Radha pulling the plough through the field (see film poster at the top) and feeding chapatis to her two sons as they pull the plough. The Hindustan Times states that Nargis symbolised mothers in "which all the mothers [in later films] had the same clichéd roles to play. Representing both motherhood and Mother Earth, who also nurtures and occasionally punishes, Nargis immortalised the Indian mother on celluloid." The film pioneered the portrayal of two morally opposed brothers personifying good and evil, which became a repeated motif in Hindi films, including Gunga Jumna (1961) and Deewaar (1975). The rebellious Birju also inspired the "angry young man" stock character that arose in 1970s Hindi cinema. According to scholar Brigitte Schulze, Mother India played a key role in shaping the young Republic of India's national identity in its early years following independence from the British Raj, due to how the film was able to successfully convey a sense of Indian nationalism to the urban and rural masses.

== See also ==
- List of Indian submissions for the Academy Award for Best Foreign Language Film
- List of submissions to the 30th Academy Awards for Best Foreign Language Film
