= Lahore Electric Supply Company =

Pakistani electric distribution company

- Type: Public utility
- Industry: Electric power
- Founded: 1912; 114 years ago
- Founder: Lala Harkishen Lal
- Headquarters: Lahore, Pakistan
- Website: lesco.com.pk

Lahore Electric Supply Company (LESCO) is a Pakistani government-owned electric distribution company. It is based in Lahore, Punjab, Pakistan.

The company was founded in 1912 by Lala Harkishen Lal. It supplies electricity to the districts of Lahore, Okara, Sheikhupura, Nankana and Kasur in Pakistan. It is owned by the Government of Pakistan.

== History ==
The Lahore Electric Supply Company (LESCO) was established in February 1912 by industrialist Lala Harkishen Lal with an initial capital of Rs 5 lakh. Lala Harkishen Lal also served as its first chairman. At that time, it was based in McLeod-Cooper Road, Lahore. In its early years, LESCO expanded its services to 12 towns in various provinces such as the Central Provinces, the United Provinces, Sindh, and the North-West Frontier Province, making it the largest power generator outside the Government Electric Supply Branch by 1941. However, starting from a conflict with the Punjab Government in May 1934, the company faced a series of challenges. The implementation of the Punjab Electricity (Emergency Powers) Act, 1941, further contributed to its decline.

By 1942, LESCO had relinquished all its licenses except for the one in Lahore.

== See also ==
- List of electric supply companies in Pakistan
- Pakistan Water & Power Development Authority (WAPDA)
- National Electric Power Regulatory Authority (NEPRA)
