= Patrick M. Martin =

American politician (1924–1968)

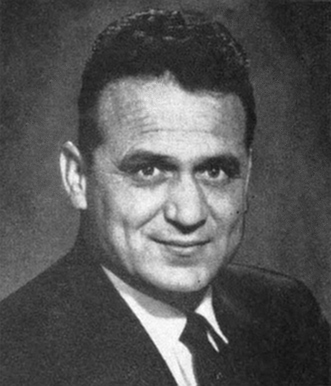

Member of the U.S. House of Representatives from California's 38th district
- In office January 3, 1963 – January 3, 1965
- Preceded by: Dalip Singh Saund (redistricting)
- Succeeded by: John V. Tunney

Personal details
- Born: Patrick Minor Martin; November 25, 1924 Norfolk, Nebraska, US
- Died: July 18, 1968 (aged 43) Long Beach, California, US
- Resting place: Arlington National Cemetery
- Party: Republican

Patrick Minor Martin (November 25, 1924 – July 18, 1968) was an American lawyer and World War II veteran who served one term as a U.S. representative from California from 1963 to 1965.

== Early life and education ==
Martin was born in Norfolk, Nebraska. Originally named Minor Carl Martin, he was known as "Pat", and in 1963 he had his name legally changed to Patrick Minor Martin. He was raised in Nebraska and California. He graduated from Riverside Junior College in 1947, the University of California at Berkeley in 1949, and the Hastings College of Law in 1953. He was admitted to the bar and began the practice of law in Riverside, California.

== World War II ==
Martin was a veteran of World War II, having served as a radioman in the United States Coast Guard from 1943 to 1945.

== Congress ==
Martin was elected as a Republican to the Eighty-eighth Congress (January 3, 1963 – January 3, 1965). He voted against the Civil Rights Act of 1964.

== Later career and death ==
He was an unsuccessful candidate for reelection in 1964 to the Eighty-ninth Congress, after which he resumed the practice of law.

Martin was diagnosed with melanoma, and died in Long Beach, California on July 18, 1968. He was buried at Arlington National Cemetery, Section 13, Grave 14684-F.

== Electoral history ==
1962 United States House of Representatives elections in California
Party	Candidate	Votes	%
Republican	Patrick M. Martin	68,583	55.9
Democratic	Dalip Singh Saund (incumbent)	54,022	44.1
Total votes		122,605	100.0
Republican gain from Democratic			

1964 United States House of Representatives elections in California
Party	Candidate	Votes	%
Democratic	John V. Tunney	85,661	52.8
Republican	Patrick M. Martin (incumbent)	76,525	47.2
Total votes		162,186	100.0
Democratic gain from Republican			

U.S. House of Representatives
Preceded by District Created	Member of the U.S. House of Representatives from California's 38th congressional district 1963–1965	Succeeded by John V. Tunney
