= Dalip Singh Saund =

American politician (1899–1973)

- ਦਲੀਪ ਸਿੰਘ ਸੌਂਧ
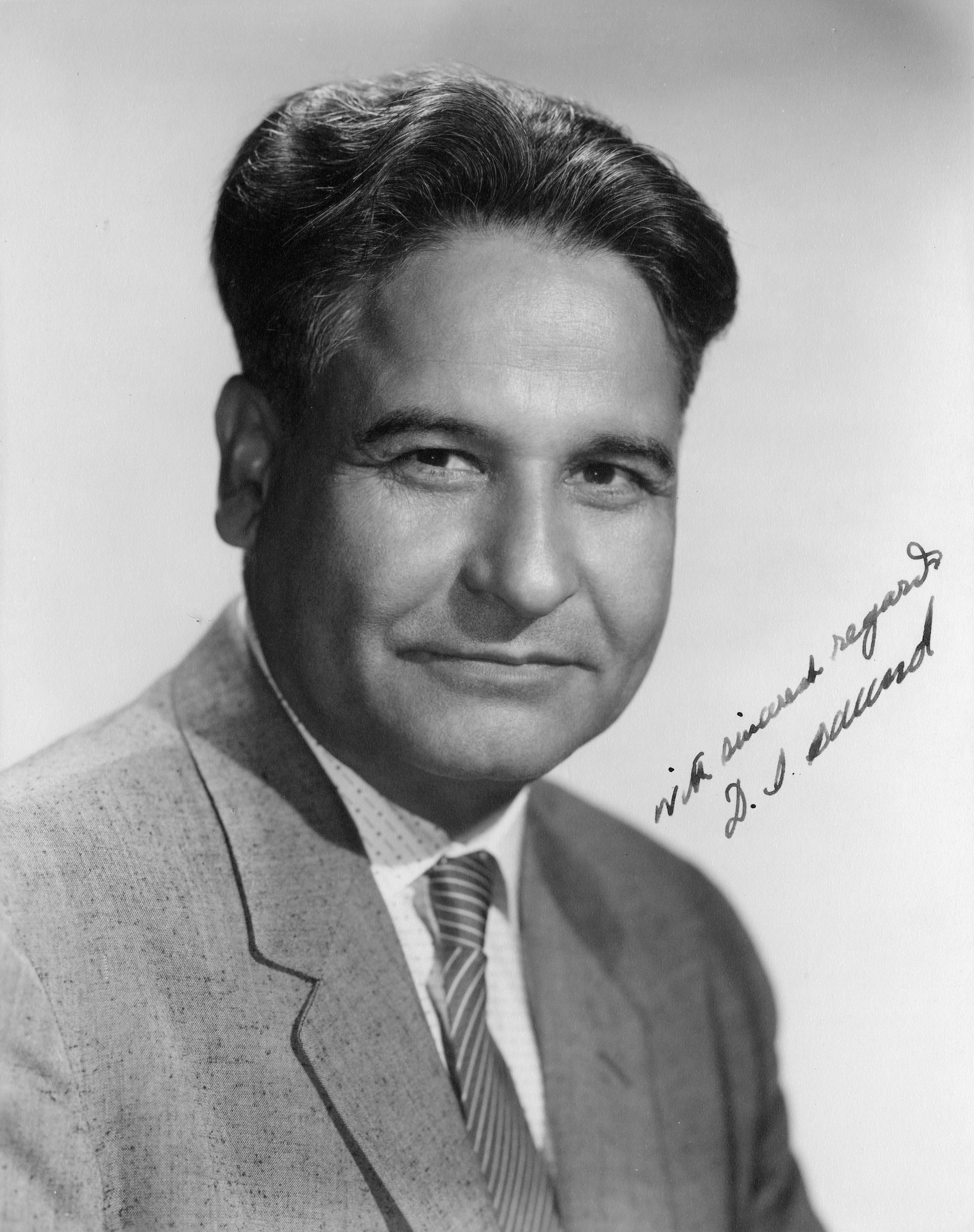
- Official portrait c. 1961

Member of the U.S. House of Representatives from California's 29th district
- In office January 3, 1957 – January 3, 1963
- Preceded by: John J. Phillips
- Succeeded by: Patrick M. Martin (redistricting)

Personal details
- Born: September 20, 1899 Chhajulwadi, Amritsar district, Punjab Province, British India (present-day Punjab, India)
- Died: April 22, 1973 (aged 73) Los Angeles, California, U.S.
- Citizenship: British India (1899–1947); India (1947–1949); United States (1949–1973)
- Party: Democratic
- Spouse: Marian Kosa
- Relatives: Daleep Singh (Great-grandnephew)
- Education: University of the Punjab (BS); University of California, Berkeley (MA, PhD)

Dalip Singh Saund (Punjabi: ਦਲੀਪ ਸਿੰਘ ਸੌਂਧ, romanized: Dalīp Siṅgh Saundh; September 20, 1899 – April 22, 1973) was an Indian-born American farmer, lobbyist, judicial officer, academic, and Democratic Party politician who served in the United States House of Representatives from 1957 to 1963. He was the first Sikh, Punjabi American, Indian American, and Asian American elected to the United States Congress. As a resident of Westmoreland, California, Saund represented California's 29th congressional district, which at the time consisted of Imperial and Riverside counties.

Born in Chhajulwadi, Punjab, British India, Saund studied at Prince of Wales College and University of the Punjab, where he was active in the Indian independence movement. In 1920, he immigrated to the United States to continue his studies at the University of California, Berkeley, where he earned a Master of Arts and Ph.D. After marrying and settling in California's Imperial Valley as a farmer, he continued his activism for Indian independence and established the Indian Association of America, lobbying for the eligibility of Indians for naturalization, which was permitted under the Luce–Celler Act of 1946. He became a naturalized citizen of the United States in 1949.

As a long-time supporter of President Franklin D. Roosevelt, Saund became active in local Democratic Party politics, winning a local election for a justice of the peace in 1952. Despite the area's strong Republican tendency at the time, Saund was elected to an open seat in the U.S. House of Representatives in 1956. As a member of the House Committee on Foreign Affairs, he was a critic of United States foreign policy in the Middle East and conducted a tour of Asia where he met with David Ben-Gurion, Sukarno, and Jawaharlal Nehru. He won election to three terms before he was hospitalized for a debilitating stroke in 1962 and defeated by Republican Patrick M. Martin. He died after a second stroke in 1973.

== Early life ==
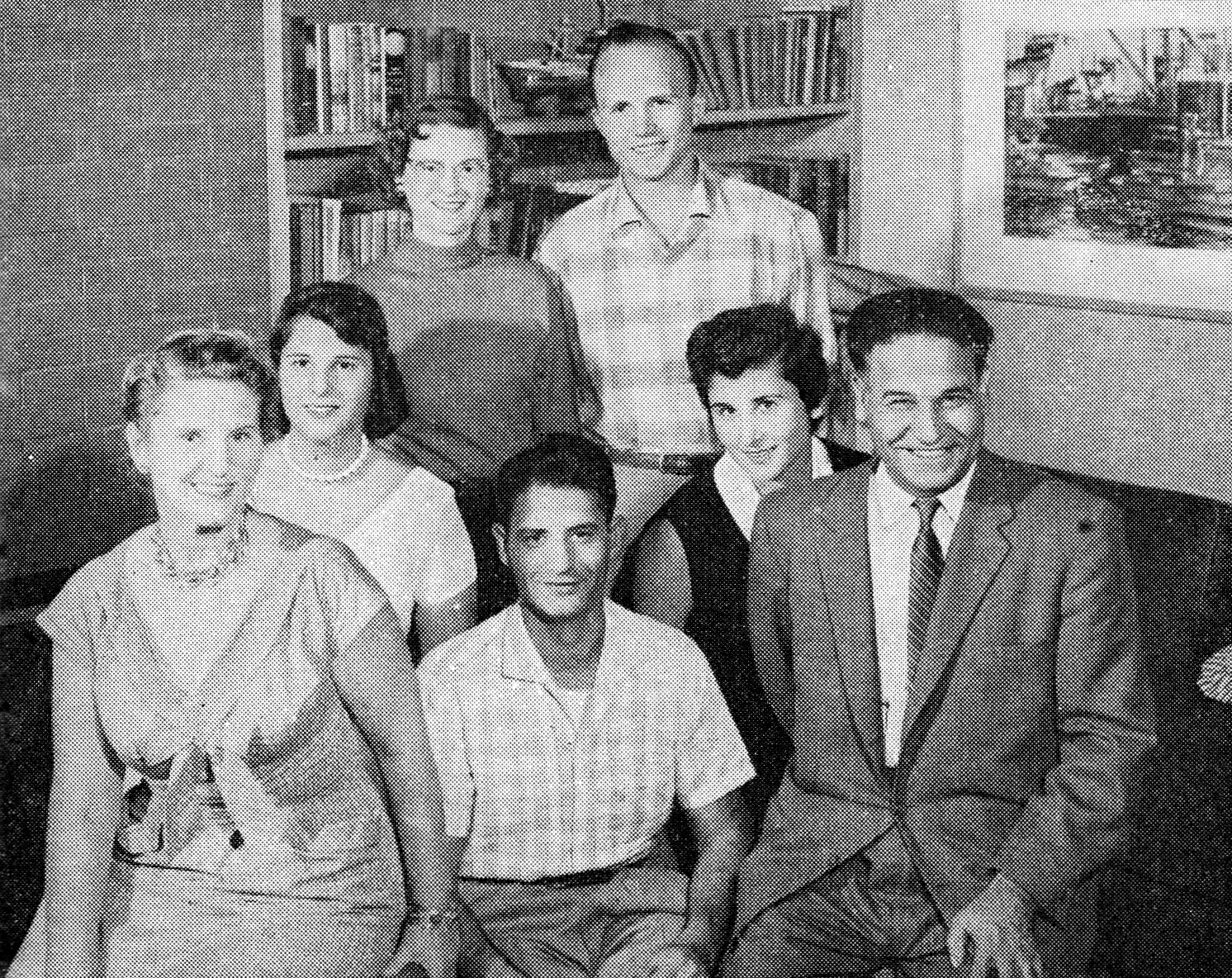
Family portrait photograph of the Saund family in 1957

Dalip Singh Saund was born in Chhajulwadi, Punjab Province, British India, on September 20, 1899, to Punjabi Sikh parents Natha Singh and Jeoni Kaur. His father died when he was ten years old. He attended Prince of Wales College. Saund supported the Indian independence movement while studying at the University of the Punjab. In 1919, he graduated with a Bachelor of Science in mathematics from the University of Punjab.

In 1920, Saund immigrated to the United States using money from his brother to study food preservation at the University of California, Berkeley and arrived on September 27. He did not return to India until 1957. He graduated with a Master of Arts in 1922, and Ph.D. in 1924. He married Marian Z. Kosa, with whom he had three children, on July 21, 1928.

Saund became a farmer in the Imperial Valley in 1925. His book My Mother India, a response to Katherine Mayo's Mother India, was published by Stockton, California's Sikh temple in 1930. He organized the Indian Association of America and served as its first president in 1942. He and the organization lobbied for legislation to allow Indians to be eligible for naturalization. The Luce–Celler Act was passed in 1946, and Saund gained American citizenship on December 16, 1949.

== Career ==
=== Early politics ===
Saund supported Franklin D. Roosevelt during the 1932 presidential election. He worked for Glen Killingsworth, the Justice of the Peace of Westmoreland in Imperial County. Saund was elected to the Imperial County Democratic Central Committee without opposition in 1950, with the aid of Killingsworth, who died shortly afterwards. He was later elected as head of the committee in 1954. He served as a delegate to the 1952, 1956, and 1960 Democratic National Conventions.

Saund ran for Justice of the Peace in the 1950 election, but was not allowed to take the position as he had not been a U.S. citizen for long enough. In 1951, Saund attempted to be appointed by the Imperial County Board of Supervisors, but they selected Frank Lyall instead. Saund defeated Lyall in the 1952 election to become Justice of the Peace of Westmoreland. He claimed to be the only native Indian holding office in the United States at the time.

=== United States House of Representatives ===
==== Elections ====
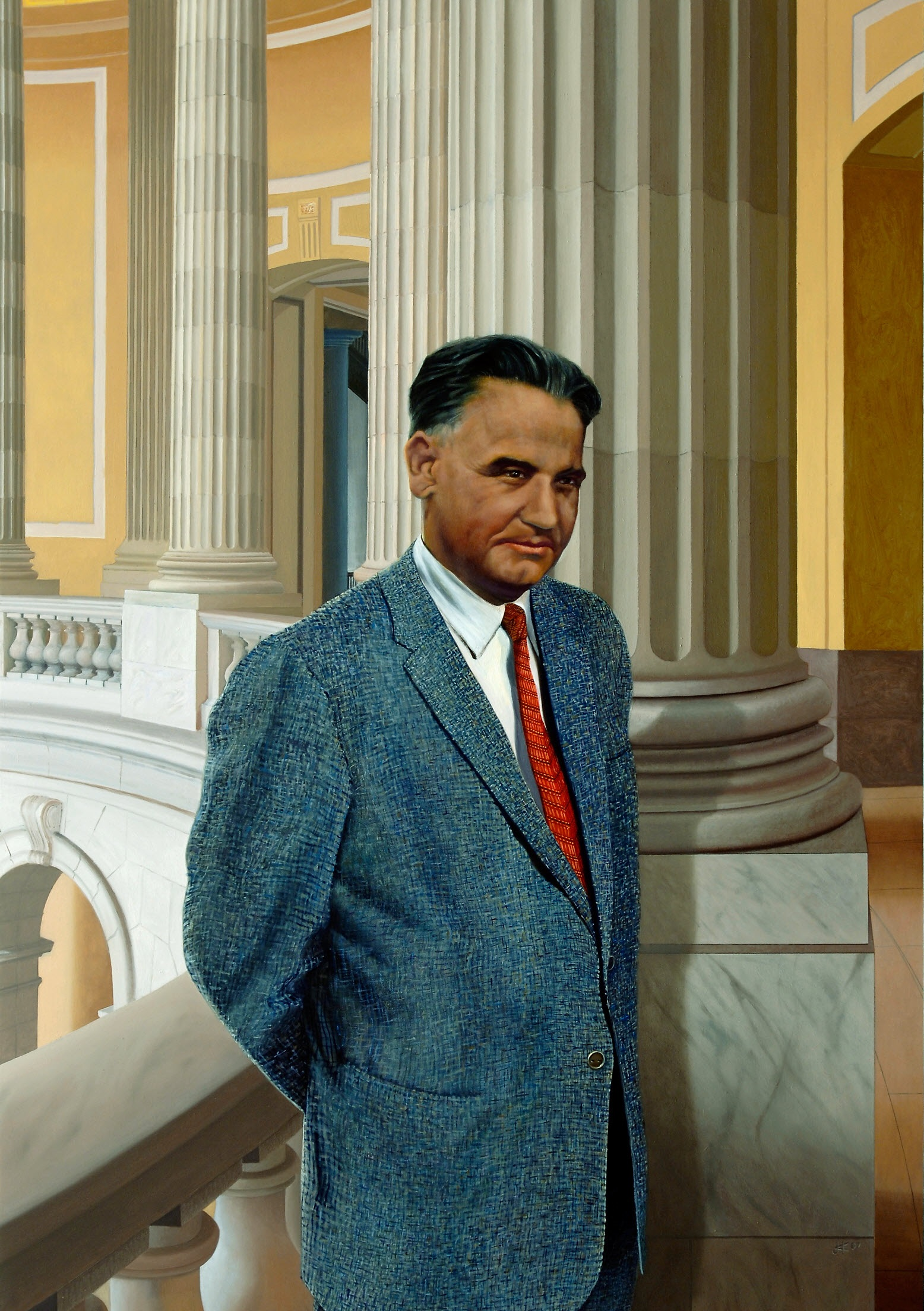
Portrait of Saund during his tenure in the United States House of Representatives

During the 1956 election, Saund ran to replace John R. Phillips, who was retiring, as the United States representative from California's 29th congressional district. On April 16, a legal challenge was filed against Saund claiming that he had not been a U.S. citizen long enough to run in the election, but the challenge was dismissed by the 4th District California Court of Appeal. He won the Democratic nomination and later defeated Republican nominee Jacqueline Cochran in the general election despite Dwight D. Eisenhower winning the area in the presidential election. He became the first and only Sikh elected to the United States Congress as well as the first Indian and Asian American elected to Congress.

Saund defeated John Babbage, a former member of the California State Legislature, in the 1958 election and Charles H. Jameson in the 1960 election. He won renomination against Rya E. Hiller during the 1962 election, despite being hospitalized for a stroke he had on May 1, but was defeated by Republican nominee Patrick M. Martin after being hospitalized at the National Naval Medical Center for the entire campaign.

==== Tenure ====
Following his election to the United States House of Representatives, Saund stated that he wanted a seat on the House Interior Committee to make sure that his district received a fair share of the Colorado River's water. In 1957, he was appointed to serve on a sub-committee in the United States House Committee on Foreign Affairs.

Saund stated during the 1956 election that he would travel to Asia if elected. He conducted a tour of multiple eastern Asian countries which included visits to Japan, Taiwan, British Hong Kong, the Philippines, South Vietnam, Indonesia, Thailand, Burma, India, and Pakistan in 1957. He also visited Israel, where he met with Prime Minister David Ben-Gurion, on his way returning to the United States. In Indonesia he met with President Sukarno and in India he met with Prime Minister Jawaharlal Nehru. Singh voted in favor of both the Civil Rights Act of 1957 and the Civil Rights Act of 1960.

== Death ==
Saund was moved to be hospitalized at UCLA Medical Center in January 1963 following the earlier stroke he had suffered in May 1962 while flying to Washington, D.C. He died on April 22, 1973, following a second stroke in Hollywood, California. Twenty-four members of the United States House of Representatives paid tribute to Saund on the House floor and a memorial service was held.

== Political positions ==
In 1957, Saund criticized the United States for its policy of "buying kings and protecting oil" in the Middle East while ignoring the people. He stated that the British had done a similar policy in India and were "tossed out of India". He stated that the same thing would happen to the United States if it continued the policy. He praised President Dwight D. Eisenhower for his stand against the United Kingdom, France, and Israel during the Suez Crisis. He criticized the United States Department of State for giving a more elaborate welcome to Queen Elizabeth II than any Asian leader. He defended the United States during the Little Rock Crisis while on tour in Japan stating that in "thirty-five out of the forty-eight states of the Union there was no discrimination against Negroes in schools or public places".

== Electoral history ==
1956 United States House of Representatives California's 29th congressional district election
Party	Candidate	Votes	%	±%
Democratic	Dalip Singh Saund	54,989	51.55%	
Republican	Jacqueline Cochran	51,690	48.45%	
Total votes		106,679	100.00%	

1958 United States House of Representatives California's 29th congressional district election
Party	Candidate	Votes	%	±%
Democratic	Dalip Singh Saund (incumbent)	64,518	62.39%	+10.84%
Republican	John Babbage	38,899	37.61%	−10.84%
Total votes		103,417	100.00%	

1960 United States House of Representatives California's 29th congressional district election
Party	Candidate	Votes	%	±%
Democratic	Dalip Singh Saund (incumbent)	76,139	57.05%	−5.34%
Republican	Charles H. Jameson	57,319	42.95%	+5.34%
Total votes		133,458	100.00%	

1962 United States House of Representatives California's 38th congressional district election
Party	Candidate	Votes	%	±%
Republican	Patrick M. Martin	68,583	55.94%	+12.99%
Democratic	Dalip Singh Saund (incumbent)	54,022	44.06%	−12.99%
Total votes		122,605	100.00%	

== See also ==
- List of Asian Americans and Pacific Islands Americans in the United States Congress
- List of Asian American jurists

== Works cited ==
- Moore, John; Preimesberger, Jon; Tarr, David, eds. (2001). Congressional Quarterly's Guide to U.S. Elections. Congressional Quarterly. ISBN 1568026021.
- Pradhan, Sachin (1996). India in the United States: Contributions of Indian & Indians in the United States of America. SP Press International. ISBN 0961712910.
- Saund, Dalip (1960). Congressman From India. E. P. Dutton.

U.S. House of Representatives
Preceded by John J. Phillips	Member of the U.S. House of Representatives from California's 29th congressional district 1957–1963	Succeeded by George Brown Jr.
