= Lala Harkishen Lal =

Indian industrialist, entrepreneur and politician

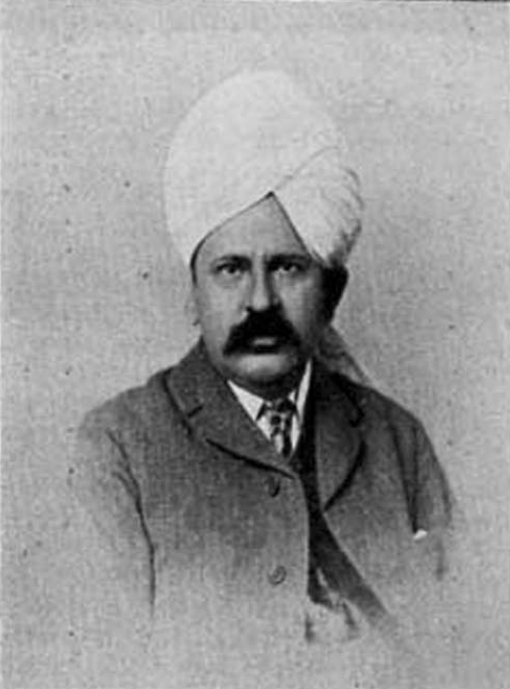
- Born: Lala Harkishan Lal; 1864/66; Layyah, Punjab, British India (now in Punjab, Pakistan)
- Died: 13 February 1937; Lahore, Punjab, British India (now in Punjab, Pakistan)
- Occupations: Industrialist, entrepreneur, politician
- Years active: 1895–1937
- Children: 3 sons including K. L. Gauba; Jeevan Lal Gauba

Lala Harkishen Lal (1864/66 – 13 February 1937) was an Indian industrialist, entrepreneur and politician. He was a co-founder of Punjab National Bank, and founder of factories and banks Punjab Cotton Press Company Ltd., the People's Bank of India Ltd., Amritsar Bank Ltd.; the Kanpur Flour Mills Ltd. in pre-independent India. He was also instrumental in the establishment of Indian Associated Chamber of Commerce, the precursor, of the formation of the Federation of Indian Chambers of Commerce & Industry. As politician, he served as the Minister of Agriculture of the government of Punjab Province between 1920 and 1923.

== Early life ==
Born in the town of Layyah near Dera Ghazi Khan in the Punjab Province, of British India (now in Punjab, Pakistan) into an Arora Khatri family. Harkishen Lal was educated at the Government College in Lahore. He later went to the Trinity College, Cambridge on a scholarship and secured a distinction in Mathematical Tripos there. Upon returning to India, he worked as a Mathematics lecturer.

== Career ==
On the advice of banker Dyal Singh Majithia, to pursue "money" to do what one 'likes', Harkishen Lal started his career in business by becoming the Honorary Secretary of the Punjab National Bank. The following year, he founded the Bharat Insurance Company in Lahore and subsequently was one of the trustees during the launch of the newspaper The Tribune. By 1899, he quit the bar and involved himself in industrial and commercial organizations. He was recognized by Lieutenant Governor Louis Dane for establishing the Lahore Electric Supply Company which built the initial electricity infrastructure of Lahore in 1913.

Following this commercial success, Harkishen Lal encountered difficulties from religious extremists and the British colonial government. He was targeted by members of Arya Samaj, who reportedly created disturbance and panic among his banking clientele. In April 1919, he was arrested on charges of conspiracy and "waging war against the King." He served a brief sentence and returned to business dealings. Later he faced charges related to the People's Bank and died before the case closed. His son, lawyer and writer K. L. Gauba, retaliated against the Chief Justice with a book titled Sir Douglas Young’s Magna Carta, and served a jail sentence in contempt.
