= Japanese Committee on Trade and Information =

Photos, from left to right, of Japanese agents Ralph Townsend, Frederick Vincent Williams, and David Warren Ryder

The Japanese Committee on Trade and Information was a Japanese-run propaganda organization that was active in the United States between 1937 and 1940. In Japanese it was called the Jikyoku Iinkai (時局委員会) , literally the "Current Affairs Committee".

Many of its former members and paid propagandists were tried and imprisoned in the aftermath of the bombing of Pearl Harbor.

== Founding of the Japanese Committee on Trade and Information ==
The Japanese Committee on Trade and Information was established on September 26, 1937 by the Japanese consulate in San Francisco with the close cooperation of local Japanese businessmen. Located at 549 Market Street, it was created soon after the outbreak of the Second Sino-Japanese War with the objective of influencing public opinion in the United States towards Japan and against China. Officially, the Committee sought to foster the "traditional friendship" between the USA and Japan.

== Operations ==
A secret cable sent by the Japanese consulate to the Foreign Affairs Ministry notes that the Japanese Committee on Trade and Information was the main organization responsible for the "creation of propaganda and information for the United States". It was headed by K. Takahashi, a local manager of Nippon Yusen Kaisha, until March 15, 1940, and from then on by Mitsubishi executive S. Takeuchi, with one Tsutomu Obana, secretary of the Japanese Chamber of Commerce in San Francisco, serving also as the Committee's secretary.

Following the passage of the Foreign Agents Registration Act in 1938, the Japanese Committee on Trade and Information registered as an agency controlled by Japanese nationals, though when registering Tsutomu Obana concealed information that the organization was directly funded and guided by the government of Japan. Over the course of its existence the Committee spent at least $175,000 to promote pro-Japanese causes, money which was distributed at the Japanese consulate. Among the individuals the organization funded were Frederick Vincent Williams, who was paid $300 monthly to make pro-Japanese articles, speeches, and radio broadcasts, David Warren Ryder, who wrote a series of pamphlets entitled "Far Eastern Affairs", and Ralph Townsend, who also printed pamphlets with the Committee's support.

== Termination of the organization and aftermath ==
As the FBI stepped up its surveillance of foreign agents the Japanese consulate became increasingly concerned about exposure of the organization's covert activities. The Japanese Committee on Trade and Information was therefore disbanded on August 22, 1940.

However a federal investigation into Japanese propaganda which was launched in November 1941 discovered the work that the Japanese Committee on Trade and Information had undertaken from 1937 to 1940. The two special prosecutors who spearheaded the case, Albert E. Arent and Arthur B. Caldwell, made their case before a federal grand jury in San Francisco and on 28 January 1942 succeeded in having the United States government indict Townsend, Ryder, and Williams for violations of the Foreign Agents Registration Act, as well as Obana for filing false and incomplete statements on behalf of the organization. Townsend and Ryder were accused of acting as foreign agents without registering, and while Williams had registered, he was charged with making false declarations and concealing information when registering. All four were also charged with entering a criminal conspiracy. Obana and Townsend pleaded guilty, though Townsend denied that he was acting on behalf of Japan. Upon pleading guilty to violating the Foreign Agents Registration Act, the charge of conspiracy was dropped against Townsend. Ryder and Williams professed their innocence and claimed ignorance about the extent to which the Japanese government had controlled the Committee, but both were convicted on all counts in June. All four were given prison sentences. The United States government also indicted Takahashi and Takeuchi, and named two Japanese consuls as co-conspirators, but they had all already left the country before the indictment was laid down.

== See also ==
- Ralph Townsend
- Nihon Boeki Shinko Kyokai (Ja) - Literary "Japan Trade Association" (1941-1947).
- Nihon Boeki Kai (Ja) - Literary "Japan Trade Committee" (1942-).
