= Babubhai Mehta =

Babubhai Mehta was a writer of stories for Bollywood Hindi films. His notable work include the story of 1940 film Aurat, which was remade as Mother India in 1957.

== Filmography ==
=== As writer ===
- 1941 Bahen
- 1940 Aurat
- 1939 Ek Hi Raasta (writer)
- 1939 Jeevan Saathi (writer)
- 1938 Teen Sau Din Ke Baad (writer)
- 1937 Jagirdar
