= Mother India (book) =

1927 book by Katherine Mayo

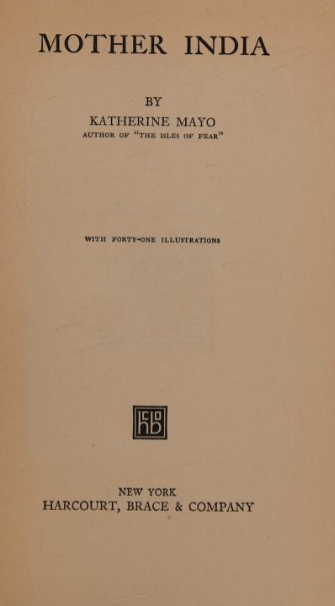
- Title page for Mother India (1927)
- Author: Katherine Mayo
- Language: English
- Subject: Indian society, British colonialism, women's rights
- Genre: Non-fiction, polemic
- Publisher: Harcourt, Brace & Company (US); Jonathan Cape (UK)
- Publication date: 1927
- Publication place: United States
- Media type: Print (hardcover)
- Pages: 440
- Preceded by: The Isles of Fear (1925)
- Followed by: The Face of Mother India (1935)

Mother India (1927) is a polemical book by American journalist Katherine Mayo on the status of women and girls in Indian society as well as her perception of Hindu culture. The book was translated into more than a dozen languages and reprinted many times in the US.

== Content ==
Written in opposition to the movement for Indian independence, the book criticized India's treatment of women, the untouchables in the caste system in India, animals, the countryside, and the character of its nationalistic politicians. A large part of the book dealt with the problems resulting from the marriage of young girls. This was considered to be one of the main causes that led to an uproar across India after many Indian newspapers declared the book "scurrilous libel" against Hindus and Hinduism.

== Reception ==
Mayo's book created outrage across India, and it was burned along with effigies of her. Mayo’s book also sparked controversy among American liberal scholars, who were also critical of Mayo. A major opponent to Mother India was Jabez Sunderland, a longtime pro-India activist. Sunderland made comparisons between Indian leaders and American revolutionaries who played a part in the fight for American freedom to counteract Mayo’s racial nationalism. In his book India, America and World Brotherhood, Sunderland asserted that imperialistic rule over India was unjustifiable, parasitic, and destructive. His book included personal testimonies and statistics mainly gathered from the Indian government to counteract Mayo’s claims about Indian society. Instead, Sunderland attributed the problems that Mayo blamed as intrinsic to Indian society, as symptoms “rooted in centuries of colonial oppression.”

Mayo's book was criticized by Indian independence activist Mohandas Karamchand Gandhi as a "report of a drain inspector sent out with the one purpose of opening and examining the drains of the country to be reported upon." Gandhi reminded Western readers of the shortcomings of their own societies, as did Sunderland who stated, “India knows nothing so bad as our American lynching and burning of Negroes.” Sunderland drew on how at one time Irish playwright George Bernard Shaw had used the example of lynching as justification for why America was not civilized enough for self-governance and commented that “the United States is not fit to rule itself and ought forthwith to be taken in hand and civilized by some foreign nation say England or France or Japan.”

=== Response books ===
The book prompted over fifty critical books and pamphlets to be published, which highlighted Mayo's incorrect assertions and distorted perception of Indian society, which had become a powerful influence on the American public's view of India. The controversy caused by Mayo's work was helpful to aid nationalist India in the reversal of Western colonial propaganda. The outrage caused led to a new school of liberal Indian feminism and a new vision for Indian women. This new ideal of an Indian woman was viewed as the model embodiment of what it meant to be Indian in an independent nation state.

Annie Besant called Mother India "a remarkably wicked book slandering the whole Indian people". The book was cited as an example of imperial feminism by American historian Liz Wilson, who wrote that Mayo employed feminist rhetoric to support her criticisms of the Indian independence movement. Wilson also explored alternative conclusions that some Western reviewers had come to after reading Mayo’s book. For example, one anonymous 1927 review in the New Statesman claimed that the Indian vices supposedly detailed in Mayo's book were exclusive to Hindus, and Muslims in India were "comparatively free of these sub-human vices". The review provoked a furious response from Bengali intellectual Rabindranath Tagore, who accused Western commentators of hypocrisy.

Mayo's initial inspiration for her assertions against India came from a British intelligence agent working for the Indian Political Intelligence Office (IPIO), which was based in London. The IPIO was formed in response to the dissemination of anarchist and revolutionary elements of Indian nationalism in Europe during the First World War.

In 1929, Harry H. Field, whom Mayo had acknowledged in the foreword of Mother India, wrote a book called After Mother India in which he responded to the criticisms levelled against Mayo's work, added more commentaries and wrote a brief biography of Katherine. A chapter was dedicated to the most notable critique, which was the one written by Gandhi.

After its publication Dalip Singh Saund, who later became a U.S. Congressman, wrote My Mother India in 1930, to counter Mayo's assertions. Saund’s writing focused largely on rebutting Mayo’s claims about Indian men’s behaviour towards women. Saund clarified that in the eyes of Indian law, women were seen as exact equals to men with the same rights to possess property, the same rights to go before the courts of justice and to ask the protection of the law. He also corrected Mayo’s conclusions regarding child marriage in India which was a focal issue in Mother India. He noted that whilst child marriage was prevalent, the child did not cohabit with her husband until she had reached puberty. He added that although these young Indian wives may have lacked formal education, they were fully trained to run a household and to raise their children. Saund used statistics from the Census Report of 1921 that showed that sixty percent of Indian girls remained unmarried at the beginning of their sixteenth year, as evidence for the situation in India regarding marriage developing.

Saund's work shifted focus onto American culture and the sexual issues that were prevalent in the US stating, “When fifteen to twenty-five girls out of every hundred in any country indulge in irresponsible sexual relationships between the ages of fifteen and eighteen, that country is not in a healthy moral condition The effect of these early sexual intimacies between young girls and boys is ruinous to their later spiritual growth. How the situation may be remedied is a serious problem, which is not the task of any foreigner, however honest and friendly, to solve.”

Another response to Mayo's book was written by Dhan Gopal Mukerji in 1928, in his A Son of Mother India Answers. Mukerji disputed much of the facts that did not receive much backing in Mayo's writing and used statistics to highlight the inaccuracies in Mayo's writing. For example, he rebuts Mayo's assertion that it was commonplace for Indian girls to give birth between the ages of eight and fourteen, with figures recorded by Indian doctors showing that out of 304 births in a Bombay hospital, only three mothers were aged 14. The average age of the mothers was 18 years old. When discussing these figures, Mukerji stated, “I think the figures I have given prove that the cases instanced by Miss Mayo do not in the least represent the common customs of the country.”

The response from lawyer and journalist K. L. Gauba came in the form of parody in his 1929 book Uncle Sham: A Strange Tale of a Civilization Run Amok. The book criticizes America's growing global power, settler colonial and racist violence, as well as gender norms. Having never visited the United States, Gauba relied on sources ranging from the Chicago Commission on Race Relations to True Story to critique his perception of American women and sexuality. It was reported as a world best seller, translated into other languages, and temporarily banned in the United States.

The title of Mehboob Khan's 1957 Hindi epic film Mother India is a deliberate rebuke to Mayo's book.
