= Katherine Mayo =

American historian and nativist (1867–1940)

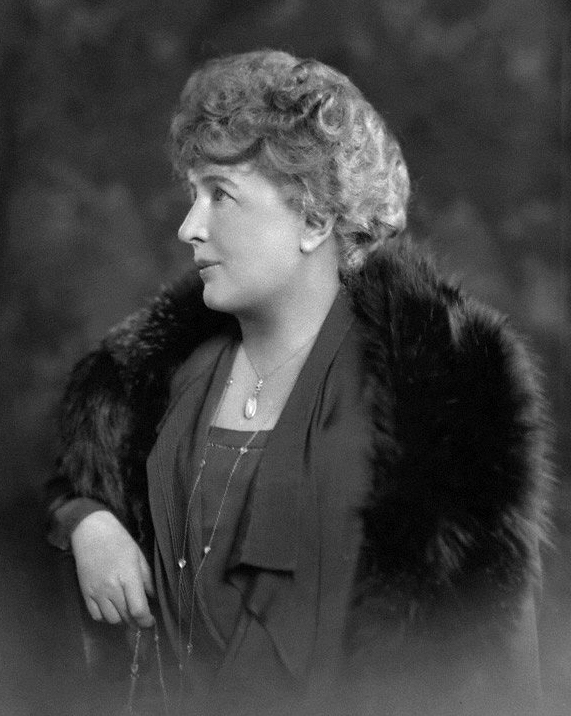
- Mayo in 1928
- Born: January 27, 1867; Ridgway, Pennsylvania
- Died: October 9, 1940 (aged 73); Bedford Hills, New York
- Citizenship: American
- Occupation: Writer
- Years active: 1892–1940
- Known for: Mother India (1927)

Katherine Mayo (January 27, 1867 – October 9, 1940) was an American historian and nativist. Mayo entered the public sphere as a political writer advocating American nativism, opposition to non-white and Catholic immigration to the United States, along with promoting racist stereotypes of African Americans. She became known for denouncing the Philippine Declaration of Independence on racialist and religious grounds. She published and promoted her best-known work, Mother India (1927), a deeply critical book on Indian society, religion, and culture. Written in opposition to the Indian independence movement, the book received a sharply divided reception upon its publication and was accused by several authors of being Indophobic, including Mahatma Gandhi.

== Life and career ==
Mayo was born in Ridgway, Pennsylvania, to James Henry and Harriet Elizabeth (Ingraham) Mayo, and was educated privately. Shortly after graduation, she started work as a researcher and historian by helping Oswald Garrison Villard of the New York Evening Post, whose father owned the newspaper, prepare his book John Brown 1800–1859: A Biography Fifty Years After, a biography of the abolitionist John Brown, published in 1910.

Villard was a founder of the American Anti-Imperialist League and an officer of the National Association for the Advancement of Colored People. He influenced Mayo to become active in several social reformist circles. Mayo also became a member of the Mayflower Society and maintained links with the Daughters of the American Revolution, which at the time largely shared her hostility towards non-white and Catholic immigration to the United States.

Several of Mayo's early writings promoted anti-Catholicism and racist views towards people of color. Mayo combined anti-Catholicism and anti-Filipino sentiment in her writings that opposed the Philippine Declaration of Independence. Mayo's early journalistic works promoted an "Anglo-Saxon" version of American nationalism and contained xenophobic remarks towards Irish immigrants, as well as racist views of African Americans.

Mayo claimed that "negroes" were sexually aggressive and lacked self-control, thus rendering them a threat to "innocent white Anglo-Saxon women". Mayo put her writing skills behind the effort to establish the New York State Police and supported their efforts to suppress immigrants and African Americans whose involvement in labor rights movements were viewed by Mayo as a threat to white supremacy.

=== Mother India ===
In 1927, Mayo published a polemical book, Mother India, in which she attacked Indian society, religion, and culture. Mayo's book quickly became controversial in both India and the West, where critics criticized her depiction of India and its culture as Indophobic. Conversely, some admirers of her work pointed to the accuracy of many of her claims.

The book created a sensation on three continents. Written in opposition to the movement for Indian independence, Mayo criticized India's treatment of women, the Dalits, its animals, and the character of its nationalistic politicians. Mayo singled out what she perceived to be the "rampant" and fatally weakening sexuality of Indian males, which she claimed to be at the core of all problems in India as developmental trends which lead to masturbation, rape, homosexuality, prostitution, venereal diseases, early sexual intercourse, and premature maternity. Mayo's claims were supported by the colonial government as a countermeasure to growing sympathies for the Indian independence movement among outside observers. The book was also propagated among Americans who connected the movement for Indian independence with the American Revolution.

The book prompted the publication of over fifty books and pamphlets critical of Mayo's claims as well as the production of an eponymous film, presenting an epic drama which constituted a rebuttal to the claims made in the book. The book was burned in India and New York, along with effigies of Mayo. It was criticized by Indian independence activist Mohandas Karamchand Gandhi, who wrote in response:

This book is cleverly and powerfully written. The carefully chosen quotations give it the false appearance of a truthful book. But the impression it leaves on my mind is that it is the report of a drain inspector sent out with the one purpose of opening and examining the drains of the country to be reported upon, or to give a graphic description of the stench exuded by the opened drains. If Miss Mayo had confessed that she had come to India merely to open out and examine the drains of India, there would perhaps be little to complain about her compilation. But she declared her abominable and patently wrong conclusion with a certain amount of triumph: 'the drains are India'.

After its publication Dalip Singh Saund, who later became a U.S. congressman, wrote My Mother India to counter Mayo's assertions. Another response to Mayo's book was Dhan Gopal Mukerji's A Son of Mother India Answers. The title of the 1957 Hindi epic film Mother India was a deliberate rebuke to Mayo's book. Lala Lajpat Rai wrote a book in response to Mayo's work, called Unhappy India in 1928.

== Works ==
- Justice to All: History of the Pennsylvania State Police (1917)
- The Standard Bearers: True Stories of Heroes of Law and Order (1918)
- That Damn Y (1920)
- Mounted Justice: True Stories of the Pennsylvania State Police (1922)
- The Isles of Fear: The Truth about the Philippines (1925)
- Mother India (1927)
- Slaves of the Gods (1929)
- Volume II (1931)
- Soldiers What Next! (1934)
- The Face of Mother India (1935)
- General Washington's Dilemma (1938)
- Selections from Mother India (1998, Mrinalini Sinha, editor)
