= List of Hindi films of 1952 =

A list of films produced by the Bollywood film industry based in Mumbai in 1952:

== 1952 in Indian cinema ==
- Dilip Kumar went on to win the first Filmfare Best Actor Award in 1954 for his performance in Daag.
- Meena Kumari went on to win the first Filmfare Best Actress Award for her role in Baiju Bawra.

== Highest-grossing films ==
The ten highest-grossing films at the Indian box office in 1952:

Rank	Title	Gross collection
1	Aan	₹2.80 crore
2	Baiju Bawra	₹2.30 crore
3	Jaal	₹1.85 crore
4	Daag	₹1.50 crore
5	Anhonee	₹1.40 crore
6	Maa	₹1.10 crore
7	Sangdil	₹95 lakh
8	Nagina	₹75 lakh
9	Bewafa	₹65 lakh
10	Aandhiyan	₹60 lakh

== A-B ==
Title	Director	Cast	Genre	Notes
Aan	Mehboob Khan	Dilip Kumar, Premnath, Nimmi, Nadira, Murad, Cuckoo, Sheela Nayak, Mukri, Amir Bano	Swashbuckling Musical Romance	Music: Naushad Lyrics: Shakeel Badayuni
Aandhiyan	Chetan Anand	Dev Anand, Nimmi, Kalpana Kartik, Durga Khote, K. N. Singh, Leela Mishra, Johnny Walker	Romance Drama	Music: Ali Akbar Khan Lyrics: Narendra Sharma
Aasmaan	D. M. Pancholi	Shyama, Nasir Khan, Anwar Hussain, Lalita Pawar, Veera, Badri Prasad, David, Asha Parekh, Achala Sachdev	Family Drama	Music: O. P. Nayyar Lyrics: Prem Dhawan
Ajeeb Ladki	Mohammed Ehsan	Naseem Banu, Rehman, Shashikala, Cuckoo, Agha, Jayant, Shyam Kumar	Social	Music: Ghulam Mohammed Lyrics: Shakeel Badayuni
Aladdin Aur Jadui Chirag	Homi Wadia	Mahipal, Meena Kumari, B. M. Vyas, S. N. Tripathi, W. M. Khan, Jilloo, Vasantrao Pahelwan	Costume Fantasy	Music: S. N. Tripathi Lyrics: Shyam Hindi
Amber	Jayant Desai	Nargis, Raj Kapoor, Agha, Bipin Gupta, Baby Tanuja, Cuckoo, Helen, Nayampalli, B. M. Vyas	Romance Drama	Music: Ghulam Mohammed Lyrics:Shakeel Badayuni
Anmol Sahara	Amar Dutt	Jayshree, Ameeta, Krishna Kumari, Raj Kumar, Geeta, Nilima	Social	Music: Santosh Mukherjee Lyrics: B. M. Sharma
Anand Math	Hemen Gupta	Prithviraj Kapoor, Bharat Bhushan, Geeta Bali, Pradeep Kumar, Ajit, Ranjana, Murad	Patriotic Historical	Music: Hemant Kumar Lyrics: Bankim Chandra Chattopadhyaya, Jayadeva
Anhonee	K. A. Abbas	Nargis, Raj Kapoor, Achala Sachdev, Om Prakash, Agha, David, Jankidas, Shaukat Hashmi	Social Drama	Music: Roshan Lyrics: Ali Sardar Jafri
Anjaam	Shanti Kumar	Premnath, Vyjayantimala, Kuldip Kaur, Yakub, Dulari, Jankidas, Shammi	Social Drama	Music: Madan Mohan Lyrics: Qamar Jalalabadi
Annadata	Ismail Memon	Ajit, Veena, Sheikh Mukhtar, Murad, Neena Maker, Mukri, Kanhaiyalal, N. A. Ansari	Social	Music: Mohammed Shafi Lyrics: Anjum Jaipuri, Hasrat Jaipuri, Ali Sardar Jafri
Apni Izzat	Nanabhi Bhatt	Motilal, Munawwar Sultana, Yakub, Sulochana Chatterji, Gope, Yashodhara Katju, Agha, Raj Mehra	Family Drama	Music: Hansraj Behl Lyrics: Bharat Vyas, Varma Malik
Ashiana	B. Trilochan	Raj Kapoor, Nargis, Iftekhar, Master Rattan, Mohana, Randhir	Romance, Supernatural	Music: Madan Mohan Lyrics: Rajendra Krishan
Badnam	D. D. Kashyap	Balraj Sahni, Shyama, Prabhu Dayal, Sheila, Ulhas, Jankidas, Murad	Melodrama	Music: Basant Prakash Lyrics: Hasrat Jaipuri, Shailendra
Baghdad	Nanabhi Bhatt	Ranjan, Begum Para, Bhagwan, Anwar Hussain, Yashodhara Katju, Hari Shivdasani	Fantasy	Music: Bulo C. Rani Lyrics: Raja Mehdi Ali Khan
Bahu Beti	S. L. Dheer	Geeta Bali, Amarnath, Jaswant, Vijayalaxmi, Leela Mishra, Rashid Khan, S. Nazir	Family Drama	Music: S. D. Batish Lyrics: Kaifi Azmi
Baiju Bawra	Vijay Bhatt	Meena Kumari, Bharat Bhushan, Surendra, Kuldip Kaur, Radhakrishan, Manmohan Krishna, Bipin Gupta	Legend Romance Musical	Music: Naushad Lyrics: Shakeel Badayuni
Betaab	Harbans Singh	Naseem Banu, Geeta Bali, Ashok Kumar, Motilal, Murad, Kumar, Kamal	Social Drama	Music: S. D. Batish Lyrics: Bharat Vyas, Roopbani, Kaif Irfani
Bewafa	M. L. Anand	Raj Kapoor, Nargis, Ashok Kumar, Bhudo Advani, Neelam, Siddiqi	Romance Drama	Music: A. R. Qureshi Lyrics: Sarshar Sailani
Bhakta Puran	Dhirubhai Desai	Shahu Modak, Nirupa Roy, Sapru, B. M. Vyas, Lalita Pawar, Niranjan Sharma, Naaz, Shanta Kumari, S. N. Tripathi	Devotional	Music: Chitragupta Lyrics: Ramesh Chandra Pandey, Gopal Singh Nepali
Bhule Bhatke	Brij Mohan	Bhagwan, Shyama, Dulari, Baburao Pendharkar, Leela Gupte, Habib, Nihal	Action	Music: Manohar Lyrics: Shams Azimabadi

== C-J ==
Title	Director	Cast	Genre	Notes
Chamkee	J. K. Nanda	Shekhar, Ragini, Roopmala, Jeevan, Leela Mishra, Ulhas, Murad, Cuckoo, Shashikala	Social	Music: Manna Dey Lyrics: Kavi Pradeep
Chhatrapati Shivaji	Bhalji Pendharkar	Prithviraj Kapoor, Ranjana, Vanmala, Baburao Pendharkar, Vasantrao Pahelwan, Gajanan Jagirdar, Ratnamala, Lalita Pawar	Biopic	Music: C. Ramchandra Lyrics: Shailendra
Chhoti Maa	Hemchunder	Meera Misra, Pahari Sanyal, Asit Baran, Molina, Shakoor, Manorama, Hiralal	Family Drama	Music: Pankaj Mullick Lyrics: P. Bhushan, B. M. Sharma
Daag	Amiya Chakravarty	Dilip Kumar, Nimmi, Usha Kiran, Kanhaiyalal, Chandrashekhar, Leela Mishra, Lalita Pawar, Jawahar Kaul	Social Drama	Music: Shankar Jaikishan Lyrics: Shailendra, Hasrat Jaipuri
Dahej	V, Shantaram	Prithviraj Kapoor, Karan Dewan	Drama	
Devyani	Vasant Painter	Mahipal, Sapru, Minaxi, Baburao Pendharkar, Shakuntala	Fantasy	Music: Purushottam Lyrics: Manohar Khanna
Diwana	Abdul Rashid Kardar	Suraiya, Suresh, Sumitra Devi, Shyam Kumar, Madan Puri, Amirbai Karnataki	Social	Music: Naushad Lyrics: Shakeel Badayuni
Do Raha	Bal Chhabra	Shekhar, Nalini Jaywant, Agha, Murad, K. N. Singh, Pratima Devi, Jagdish Sethi	Social	Music: Anil Biswas Lyrics: Sahir Ludhianvi, Prem Dhawan
Draupadi Vastraharan	W. Garcher	Shahu Modak, Ratnamala, Mangla, Vasantrao Pahelwan, W. Garcher, Sapru, Amarnath	Mythological	Music: Shanker Rao Vyas Lyrics: Saraswati Kumar Deepak, Pandit Shivraj
Ghungroo	Hiren Bose	Om Prakash, Sumitra Devi, Kuldip Kaur, Murad, K. N. Singh, Badri Prasad	Social	Music: C. Ramchandra Lyrics: Rajendra Krishan
Goonj	Phani Majumdar	Suresh, Suraiya, Bhagwan, Sapru, Madan Puri, Manju, Randhir		Music: Sardul Kwatra Lyrics: D. N. Madhok, Verma Malik
Hamari Duniya	Sushil Sahu	Bharat Bhushan, Kishore Sahu, Asha Mathur, Kuldip Kaur, Om Prakash, Jankidas, Menaka Devi, Hiralal	Social	Music: S. B. Pathak Lyrics: Indeevar, Hasrat Jaipuri
Hangama	Ram Kamlani	Nasir Khan, Nutan, Yakub, Gope, K. N. Singh, David, Raj Mehra, Cuckoo	Social Drama	Music: C. Ramchandra Lyrics: Rajendra Krishan
Hyderabad Ki Nazneen	S. M. Yusuf	Manhar Desai, Nigar Sultana, Wasti, Murad, Durga Khote, W. M. Khan	Costume	Music: Vasant Desai Lyrics: Noor Lakhnavi
Indrasen	Raja Nene	Prem Adib, Ranjana, Durga Khote, Paro Devi, Nand Kishore, Ishwarlal	Mythological	Music: Shankar Rao Vyas Lyrics: Ramesh Gupta, Neelkanth Tiwari
Insaan	Jagdish Sethi	Prithviraj Kapoor, Ragini, Kamal Kapoor, Cuckoo, Roopmala, Kanhaiyalal, K. N. Singh, Raj Kumar	Social	Music: B. N. Bali Lyrics: Sajan Bihari, Balwant Kapoor
Izzat	Taimur Bahramshah	Nirupa Roy, Amarnath, Manorama, Agha, Jeevan, Pesi Patel	Social Drama	Music: Bulo C. Rani Lyrics: Raja Mehdi Ali Khan
Jaal	Guru Dutt	Dev Anand, Geeta Bali, Johnny Walker, Rashid Khan, K. N. Singh, Purnima, Krishna Kumari	Romance Suspense	Music: S. D. Burman Lyrics: Sahir Ludhianvi
Jaggu	Jagdish Sethi	Shyama, Kamal Kapoor, Kuldip Kaur, Tiwari, Jagdish Sethi, Baby Nanda	Social	Music: Hansraj Behl Lyrics: Naqsh Lyallpuri, Asad Bhopali, Verma Malik, A. Shah Shikarpuri, Bharat Vyas
Jalpari	Mohan Sinha	Ashok Kumar, Nalini Jaywant, Geeta Bali, Bipin Gupta, Tiwari, Sunder	Fantasy	Music: Gobindram Lyrics: Bharat Vyas
Jeet Kiski	Vasant Joglekar	Shalini, Rajan, Baburao Pendharkar, Salvi	Social	Music: Datta Devjekar

== K-R ==
Title	Director	Cast	Genre	Notes
Kafila	Arvind Sen	Ashok Kumar, Nalini Jaywant, Motilal, Ranjan, Ameeta, Nazir Hussain	Social	Music: Husanlal Bhagatram, Bhola Shreshtha Lyrics: Kavi Pradeep, Vrajendra Gaur
Khubsurat	S. F. Hussain	Suraiya, Nasir Khan, Yakub, Noor, Husn Banu, Jankidas, Bhudo Advani, Baby Zubeida	Social	Music: Madan Mohan Lyrics: Shams Azimabadi
Krishna Kanhaiya	S. Nadkarni	A L Raghvan, Narishnh Bharti, T Premavati, R. Balasubramaniam, Laxmi, Prabha	Mythological	Music: B. S. Kalla, Shufi Lyrics:
Kyonji	Nari Ghadiali	Agha, Urvashi, Leela Kumari, Sheikh, Habib	Action	Music: Nasir Bazmi Lyrics: Ratanlal Khanjar, Sheikh Adam
Lal Kunwar	Ravindra Dave	Suraiya, Nasir Khan, Usha Kiran, P. Jairaj, Agha, Durga Khote	Historical Romance Drama	Music: S. D. Burman Lyrics: Sahir Ludhianvi
Lanka Dahan	Raja Nene	Sapru, Usha Kiran, Ranjana, Paro Devi, Ranjit Kumari	Religious	Music: Hansraj Behl Lyrics: S. P. Kalla
Maa	Bimal Roy	Bharat Bhushan, Shyama, Nazir Hussain, Achala Sachdev, B. M. Vyas, Bikram Kapoor, Asit Sen, Leela Chitnis	Family Drama	Music: S. K. Pal Lyrics: Bharat Vyas
Mamta	Gunjal	Ulhas, Sumitra Devi, Paro Devi, Kamal Mehra, Rajan Haksar, Ramesh	Social Drama	Music: Sonik, Hansraj Behl Lyrics: Verma Malik, Shyam Hindi
Mordhwaj	Balwant Bhatt	Prem Adib, Durga Khote, Tiwari, Shashi Kapoor, Leela Mishra, Ram Singh, Raj Adib, Nand Kishore, Manju, Babu Raje	Mythological	Music: Narayan Dutt Lyrics: Bharat Vyas
Moti Mahal	Ravindra Dave	Suraiya, Ajit, Pran, Jeevan, Veera, Baby Tabassum, Rattan Kumar, Roopmala	Costume Drama	Music: Hansraj Behl Lyrics: Asad Bhopali, Prem Dhawan
Mr. Sampat	S. S. Vasan	Motilal, Padmini, Kanhaiyalal, Agha, Badri Prasad, Vanaja, Sundari Bai, Narayan Rao	Social Drama	Music: Shanker Shastri Lyrics: Pandit Indra, J. S. Kashyap
Najariya	Murtaza Changezi	Geeta Bali, Sajjan, David, Begum Para, Madan Puri, Radhakrishan, Mumtaz Ali	Social	Music: Bhola Shreshtha Lyrics: Pyarelal Santoshi
Nanhe Munne	Datta Dharmadhikari	Sulochana, Raja Nene, Raja Gosavi, Shakuntala	Family Melodrama	Music: Vasant Pawar Lyrics: Pandit Phani
Nau Bahar	Pt. Anand Kumar	Ashok Kumar, Nalini Jaywant, Kuldip Kaur, Sunalini Devi, Jagdish Sethi, Indu Shivraj	Romantic Drama	Music: Roshan Lyrics: Shailendra
Neelam Pari	Dhirubhai Desai	Geeta Bali, Sajjan, Kuldip Kaur, Sapru, Naranjan Sharma, Gope, Samson	Fantasy	Music: Khurshid Anwar Lyrics: Hasrat Jaipuri, Saraswati Kumar Deepak
Nirmohi	Baij Sharma	Nutan, Sajjan, Amarnath, Chaman Puri, Rattan Kumar, Neeru, Leela Mishra, Raj Mehra	Social	Music: Madan Mohan Lyrics: Uddhav Kumar, Indeevar, P. N. Rangeen
Nishan Danka	Jayant Desai	Shyama, Ranjan, Jeevan, Baby Tabassum	Action Costume	Music: Basant Prakash Lyrics: Raja Mehdi Ali Khan, S. H. Bihari, Hasrat Jaipuri
Parbat	O. P. Dutta	Premnath, Nutan, Purnima, Shobhana Samarth, K. N. Singh, Ulhas, Raj Mehra	Social	Music: Shanker Lyrics: Shailendra, Hasrat Jaipuri
Parchhain	V. Shantaram	Sandhya, V. Shantaram, Jayshree, Asit Baran, Lalita Pawar, Ulhas, Wasti, Saroj Khan, Nimabalkar	Romantic Melodrama	Music: C. Ramchandra Lyrics: Noor Lakhnavi
Poonam	M. Sadiq	Ashok Kumar, Kamini Kaushal, Sajjan, Asha Mathur, Om Prakash, Ram Avtar	Drama	Music: Shankar Jaikishan Lyrics: Shailendra, Hasrat Jaipuri
Raag Rang	Digvijay	Ashok Kumar, Geeta Bali, Madan Puri, Ruma Devi, Jankidas, Agha, Sunder, Nand Kishore, Raja Paranjpe		Music: Roshan Lyrics: Kaif Irfani, Prakash Bakshi
Raja Harishchandra	Raman B. Desai	Prem Adib, Sumitra Devi, Gope, Tiwari, Lalita Pawar, Bipin Gupta	Mythological	Music: Husnlal Bhagatram Lyrics: Ramesh Gupta, Gulshan Jalalabadi, Qamar Jalalabadi, Bharat Vyas
Rajrani Damayanti	Raja Nene	Nirupa Roy, Usha Kiran, Trilok Kapoor, Ramsingh, Tabassum, Shakila, Rattan Kumar	Mythology	Music: Avinash Vyas Lyrics: Neelkanth Tiwari, Devendra Mohan, Mukhram Sharma
Rangeeli	Najam Naqvi	Raaj Kumar, Rehana, Yakub, Mumtaz Ali, S Nasir, Leela Mishra	Social	Music: Chic Chocolate Lyrics: Raja Mehdi Ali Khan
Rani	L. V. Prasad	Anoop Kumar, P. Bhanumati, Raja, Wahab Kashmiri	Costume Drama	Music: D. C. Dutt Lyrics: Vishwamitra Adil, J. S. Kashyap
Ratnadeep	Debaki Bose	Anuva Gupta, Abhi Bhattacharya, Manju Dey, Pahari Sanyal, Molina, Chhaya Devi, Nitish Mukerji	Social Drama	Music: Robin Chatterjee Lyrics: Mahendra Pran, Vidyapati, Madhur, Meerabai
Resham	Lekhraj Bhakri	Suraiya, P. Jairaj, Sunder, Sapru, Naaz, Achala Sachdev, Ramesh Thakur, Jagdish	Social	Music: Hansraj Behl Lyrics: Prem Dhawan

== S-Z ==
Title	Director	Cast	Genre	Notes
Saloni	J. P. Advani	Ashok Kumar, Nalini Jaywant, Mohana, Jayant, Purnima, Shakila, Achala Sachdev	Social	Music: Basant Prakash Lyrics: Raja Mehdi Ali Khan, Arjun Dev Ashq, Aziz Kashmiri, Hasrat Jaipuri
Sandesh	Bal Gajbar	Kumud, Umesh Sharma, Meenaxi, Durga Khote, Lalita Pawar, Nana Palsikar	Social	Music: S. Purushottam Lyrics:
Sangdil	R. C. Talwar	Dilip Kumar, Madhubala, Kuldip Kaur, Dara Singh, Leela Chitnis, Randhawa, Shammi	Romantce Drama	Debut film of Dara Singh. Adaptation of Charlotte Brontë's Jane Eyre. Music: Sajjad Hussain Lyrics: Rajendra Krishan
Sanskar	V. M. Vyas	Ishwarlal, Mumtaz Shanti, Pran, Veera, Shashi Kapoor, Purnima, Murad, Sapru	Social Drama	Music: Roshan Lyrics: Shailendra
Sapna	Kidar Sharma	Kishore Sahu, Bina Rai, Shakuntala, Moni Chatterjee, Hiralal, Cuckoo	Drama	Music: Shyam Babu Pathak Lyrics: Bharat Vyas
Saqi	H. S. Rawail	Prem Nath, Madhubala, Gope, Mohna, Bipin Gupta, Cuckoo, Iftekhar	Costume Drama	Music: C. Ramchandra Lyrics: Rajendra Krishan
Sheesha	Shahid Lateef	Nargis, Sajjan, Amar, Achala Sachdev, Zebunissa, Majnu, Anwari	Social Drama	Music: Ghulam Mohammed Lyrics: Majrooh Sultanpuri, Shakeel Badayuni
Shin Shinaki Boobla Boo	P. L. Santoshi	Ranjan, Rehana, Sadhana Bose, Goldstein, Radhakrishan, Mumtaz Ali, Tiwari	Action Comedy	Music: C. Ramchandra Lyrics: P. L. Santoshi
Shisham	Kishore Sharma	Nasir Khan, Nutan, Gope, Kuldip Kaur, Cuckoo Gulab	Romance Drama	Music: Roshan Lyrics: Indeevar
Shiv Leela	Govind Ghanekar	Mahipal, Ratnamala, Sumati Gupte, Shyam Kumar	Mythological	Music: Vasant Kumar Lyrics: Saraswati Kumar Deepak
Shiv Shakti	Jayant Desai	Nirupa Roy, Trilok Kapoor, Jeevan, Niranjan Sharma, Vasantrao Pahelwan	Religious	Music: Avinash Vyas Lyrics: Munshi Sagar Hussain
Shrimati Ji	I. S. Johar	Shyama, Nasir Khan, I. S. Johar, Murad, Majnu	Social Comedy	Music: S. Mohinder, Jimmy Lyrics: Raja Mehdi Ali Khan, Hasrat Jaipuri, Shailendra
Sinbad Jahazi a.k.a. Sinbad The Sailor	Nanabhai Bhatt	Ranjan, Nirupa Roy, Bhagwan, Yashodhara Katju, Jayant, Shakila, Pran, Samson	Fantasy Action	Music: Chitragupta Lyrics: Anjum Jaipuri
Tamasha	Phani Majumdar	Ashok Kumar, Dev Anand, Meena Kumari, Sunalini Devi, Randhir, S. N. Banerjee, Bipin Gupta	Social Drama	Music: Khemchand Prakash, Manna Dey, S. K. Pal Lyrics: Bharat Vyas
Tarang	I. C. Kapoor	Ajit, Munawwar Sultana, Bhagwan, Manju, Jeevan, Manorama, Niranjan Sharma	Social Action	Music: Chitragupta Lyrics: I. C. Kapoor, D. N. Madhok (1)
Usha Kiron	Javed Hussain	Nimmi, Geeta Bali, Altaf, Lalita Pawar, Mazhar Khan	Drama	Music: Hanuman Prasad Lyrics: Anjum Pilibhiti, Kamil Rashid
Vanraj	Mohammed Hussain	John Cawas, Krishna Kumari, Habib, Sheikh, Vimla	Action	Music: S. B. Pathak Lyrics: Indeevar
Vasna	Rameshwar Thakur	Ajit, Kaushalya, Urmila, Ranjit Roy, Paresh Bannerjee	Costume Drama	Music: Avinash Vyas Lyrics:
Veer Arjun	Ramchandra Thakur	Mahipal, Trilok Kapoor, Nirupa Roy, Dulari, Suryakant, Vasant Rao, Tiwari	Mythology	Music: Avinash Vyas Lyrics: Saraswati Kumar Deepak, Pandit Indra
Vidyasagar	K. P. Ghose	Utpal Dutt, Pahari Sanyal, Molina Devi, Ahindra Choudhury, Chhabi Biswas	Biopic	Music: Umapati Seel Lyrics: Madhur, Manohar Khanna (1)
Vishwamitra	Baburao Painter	Sapru, Sheela Naik, M. Kale, Sudha Apte	Mythology	Music: B. Laxman Lyrics: Manohar Khanna
Yatrik	Kartik Chatterjee	Abhi Bhattacharya, Basanta Choudhury, Arundhati Devi, Maya Mukherjee	Social	Music: Pankaj Mullick Lyrics:
Zalzala	Paul Zills	Dev Anand, Geeta Bali, Kishore Sahu, Sunalini Devi	Social Drama	Music: Pankaj Mullick Lyrics: Ali Sardar Jafri, Vrajendra Gaur, Uddhav Kumar
Zamane Ki Hawa	Walli	Mumtaz Shanti, Suresh, Pran, Husn Banu, Majnu	Social Melodrama	Music: Z. Sherman Lyrics:
