= S. Ali Raza =

Film screenwriter from India (1925–2007)

S. Ali Raza (9 January 1925 – 1 November 2007) was an Indian film screenwriter and director associated with writing the script for hit films such as Aan (1952), Andaz (1949), Mother India (1957), Reshma Aur Shera (1971), Raja Jani (1972) and Dus Numbri (1976).

== Awards ==
In 1968, he won the Filmfare award as the best dialogue writer for Saraswatichandra (1968 film).

== Career and Personal life ==
He was married to actress Nimmi (1965–2007) who appeared in Uran Khatola (1955), Barsaat (1949), Deedar (1951), Amar (1954), Aan (1952), Char Paise (1955), Rajdhani (1956), Shama (1946), Pooja Ke Phool (1964), Mere Mehboob (1963) for which he had written the dialogues.

As a director, he had only two movies to his credit – Pran Jaye Par Vachan Na Jaye (1974) and Jaanwar (1982).

== Death ==
S. Ali Raza and his wife Nimmi lived in Mumbai, India until his death at the age of 82 on 1 November 2007 due to a heart failure. A week earlier, he was admitted to Nanavati hospital for a heart artery blockage surgery.
