= Rajadhani =

Rajadhani may refer to:

- Rajdhani (film), 1956 Indian film
- Rajadhani (1994 film), a Malayalam-language film directed by Joshy Mathew, starring Babu Antony and Charmila
- Rajadhani (2011 film), a Kannada-language film directed by Sowmya Sathyan.N.R, starring Yash and Sheena Shahabadi
- Rajdhani Express, premium passenger train service in India
- Rajadhani Express, a railway service provider in Sri Lanka

== See also ==
- Rajdhani (disambiguation)
