= Love and God =

- Poster
- Directed by: K. Asif
- Starring: Sanjeev Kumar; Nimmi
- Music by: Naushad
- Release date: 27 May 1986
- Country: India
- Language: Hindi

Love and God (also known as "Kais Aur Laila") is a 1986 Indian Hindi-language film which was the final film produced and directed by K. Asif. This film was his only directorial venture to be made completely in color. Through this film, the director wanted to convey the legendary love story of Laila Majnu, starring Nimmi as Laila and Sanjeev Kumar as Qais a.k.a. Majnu.

Starting production in 1963, the film had a long and troubled production history with the death of the original lead actor Guru Dutt and then K. Asif in 1971. The film was revived and released incomplete on 27 May 1986. At the time of its release, its lead actor Sanjeev Kumar had also died six months earlier and Nimmi had already retired from films more than a decade earlier.

== Plot ==
The film is based on the famous Arab love story of Laila and Majnun. Kais, also known as Emir-E-Yemen (played by Sanjeev Kumar), is the son of Emir-E-yemen. Laila (Nimmi) is the daughter of the Emir of Basra. Kais and Laila have loved each other since childhood. When he was young, Kais was so consumed by his love for Laila that, when his teacher asked the class to practise writing the word 'Allah' in their books, Kais kept writing 'Laila' instead. 'Allah' is the Arabic word for God. The teacher became angry and hit Kais on the hands with a stick. At that moment, Laila began to bleed from her palms. The teacher believed this was a miracle that proved Kais and Laila were meant to be together. The lovers want to marry, but their families have hated each other for generations. Laila and Kais regularly meet in the desert. People gossip about their relationship, and Laila's reputation is ruined. Her father forbids her from leaving the house. Armed guards surround Laila's house and she cannot venture out to meet Kais. Kais sends a messenger pigeon to Laila. Tied to the pigeon's leg is a letter disclosing that he is on his way to meet her at her house. When Laila's father reads the message, he becomes furious at Kais's audacity. He orders his guards to kill Kais if he enters their territory. Scared for Kais's safety, Laila sends her maid, Nauheed, to warn him of the impending danger. Laila's father, the Emir of Basra, goes to Kais's house and threatens his father, saying that if Kais dares to enter Basra, he will be killed by the guards. Kais's mother sends their Abyssinian slave to rescue him. The guards grievously wound Kais. He is brought home, where his wounds are tended. Laila's father decides to move to a new city, far from Kais. Some days later, Kais's health improves and he leaves home to search for Laila. He wanders across the desert and nearly loses his sanity. People start calling him 'Majnu', meaning 'crazy, obsessed lover'. Laila's father forces her to marry Ibn-e-Salaam. Laila refuses to allow her husband to come near her. She is distraught at being separated from Kais. Gazala comforts her and advises her to visit a nearby dargah. It is said that if a devotee prays earnestly enough, their prayers will be answered. A dargah is a Sufi Islamic shrine built over the grave of a revered religious figure, often a Sufi saint or dervish. Laila eventually visits the dargah, where she prays with great fervour. Outside, she sees an extremely tired, sick and dying Kais. She embraces him, and they die in each other's arms.

== Cast ==
- Sanjeev Kumar as Kais-E-Emir / Majnu
- Nimmi as Laila
- Simi Garewal as Ghazala
- Pran as Shehzada Ibn-E-Salaam
- Amjad Khan as Kais' Servant
- Nazima as Nahid
- Agha as Adam
- Jayant as Emir-E-Basra
- Nazir Hussain as Emir-E-Yemen
- Murad as Peer-O-Mursheed
- Achala Sachdev as Laila's Mother
- Lalita Pawar as Kais' Mother
- Randhir as Moulavi

== Production ==
The film had a long and troubled production history with shooting starting in 1963 with Guru Dutt as Kais and Nimmi as Laila. However Guru Dutt's sudden death in 1964 left the film incomplete and it was shelved. Then, Asif recast Sanjeev Kumar as Kais and resumed production of the film in 1970. Unfortunately, the director K. Asif died on 9 March 1971 at the age of 48/49 and the film was once again left incomplete due to the climax not being filmed.

Fifteen years later, Asif's senior widow Akhtar Asif decided to release the incomplete film with the help of producer-director-distributor K. C. Bokadia. In a few months, they managed to salvage some usable portions of the incomplete film from three different studios and pieced them together. This cut-paste incomplete version was finally released on 27 May 1986. By the time of the film's release, its leading actor Sanjeev Kumar had also died in November 1985. The songs were composed by music director Naushad Ali, Dialogues by Wajahat Mirza and the lyrics were written by lyricist Khumar Barabankvi.

== Soundtrack ==
Song	Singer
"Allah Tere Saath Hai"	Mohammed Rafi
"Phoolon Mein Tu"	Mohammed Rafi
"Baitha Hoon Raahon Mein"	Mohammed Rafi
"Tasavvur Tera Ibaadat Hai"	Mohammed Rafi
"Yeh Nadaanon Ki Duniya Hai"	Mohammed Rafi
"Gulshan Gulshan Sehra Sehra"	Mohammed Rafi
"Rahega Jahan Mein Tera Naam"	Mohammed Rafi, Talat Mahmood, Mukesh, Manna Dey, Hemant Kumar, Suman Kalyanpur, Khan Mastana, S. Balbir
"Mohabbat Ke Nagme Khuda"	Lata Mangeshkar, Manna Dey
"Loote Hamara Pyar Yeh Kiski Majaal Hai"	Lata Mangeshkar
"Tum Nahin Ya Hum Nahin"	Lata Mangeshkar
"Mohabbat Khuda Hai"	Asha Bhosle
