= Rajdhani =

Rajdhani may refer to:

- Rajdhani (film), 1956 Indian film
- Rajadhani (1994 film), Indian Malayalam-language film
- Rajadhani (2011 film), Indian Kannada-language film
- Rajdhani, Kotli, a village in Pakistan
- Rajdhani, Gorakhpur, a village in India
- Rajdhani Park metro station, Delhi Metro, India
- Rajdhani Express, premium passenger train service in India
- Rajadhani Express, a railway service provider in Sri Lanka
- Rajdhani (newspaper), a daily newspaper from Kathmandu Nepal.

== See also ==
- Rajadhani (disambiguation)
