= Sazaa (1951 film) =

- Theatrical release poster
- Directed by: Fali Mistry
- Written by: Hasrat Lacknow (dialogues)
- Story by: Hasrat Lacknow
- Produced by: G. P. Sippy
- Starring: Dev Anand; Nimmi; Shyama; K. N. Singh; Durga Khote
- Cinematography: Jal Mistry
- Edited by: Shankerlal Nayar
- Music by: S. D. Burman
- Production company: G. P. Productions
- Distributed by: G. P. Productions
- Release date: 5 October 1951
- Country: India
- Language: Hindi

Sazaa (transl. Punishment) is a 1951 Indian Hindi-language film directed by Fali Mistry. The film stars Dev Anand, Nimmi and Shyama. This was the first film of G. P. Sippy as a producer, under the banner G. P. Productions, which he renamed Sippy Films a few years later with the film Marine Drive (1955).

== Plot ==
A lady's loud shreik is heard from the first floor of a bungalow. Ashok (Dev Anand) hurriedly descends the staircase, apparently running away from the source of shreik, runs into a street where he meets with an accident with Kamini's (Shyama) car. Kamini rushes him to a hospital. Kamini visits Ashok daily at the hospital without fail unless he recovers. Upon knowing Ashok is jobless and homeless, Kamini offers him a manager's job at her father Muthumal's (Gope) company and arranges for him to meet Mothumal over dinner. At Kamini's house, Ashok meets and falls in love with the maidservant Asha (Nimmi) who also happens to be his childhood mate. In due course, Asha reciprocates his feelings.

In reality, Ashok is the only son of a wealthy widower, Major Durjan (K. N. Singh), who gets him locked in a room with the instruction “to cremate him if he died of suffocation” after a chance discovery of another character, Rani Maa (Durga Khote), a look-alike of his deceased wife. Rani Maa is angry at Ashok, as her only daughter was abandoned by him on the night of their marriage, leading to her going mad. Durjan defies Rani Maa and decides to get Ashok married to Asha. The couple unite.

== Cast ==
- Dev Anand as Ashok
- Nimmi as Asha
- Shyama as Kamini
- K. N. Singh as Major Durjan
- Durga Khote as Rani Maa
- Lalita Pawar as Asha's Mother
- Mukri as Batwa
- Gope as Muthumal

== Soundtrack ==
Sazaa (1951 film)

Soundtrack album by S. D. Burman
- Released: 1951
- Label: HMV
- Producer: S. D. Burman

The music was composed by S. D. Burman, while Rajendra Krishan wrote the lyrics for the songs except the song "Tum Na Jaane Kis Jahan Mein Kho Gaye" which was written by Sahir Ludhianvi who, in turn, was initially assigned to write all the songs but left the project after writing this song. On the album, film critic Suresh Kohli of The Hindu noted that all the songs "have thoughtful lyrics that provide a sense of permanency through S. D. Burman's immortal compositions."

Song	Singer(s)	Lyricist
"Tum Na Jane Kis Jahan"	Lata Mangeshkar	Sahir Ludhianvi
"Dhak Dhak Jiya Kare"	Lata Mangeshkar	Rajendra Krishan
"Hum Pyar Ki Baazi Hare"	Lata Mangeshkar	Rajendra Krishan
"Ho Gayi Re Teri Ho Gayi"	Lata Mangeshkar	Rajendra Krishan
"Aaja Aaja Tera Intezar Hai, Tujhe Dhund Raha Mera Pyar Hai"	Lata Mangeshkar, Talat Mahmood	Rajendra Krishan
"O Roopnagar Ke Saudagar, O Rang Rangeele Jadugar"	Lata Mangeshkar, Pramodini Desai	Rajendra Krishan
"Aa Gupchup Gupchup Pyar Karen"	Hemant Kumar, Sandhya Mukherjee	Rajendra Krishan
"Yeh Baat Koi Samjhaye Re"	Sandhya Mukherjee	Rajendra Krishan

== Reception ==
Kohli wrote, "Given the limited scope of the script, the cast performs well with the dreamy-eyed Nimmi particularly excelling".
