= G. P. Sippy =

Indian film producer and director (1914–2007)

- Born: Gopaldas Parmanand Sipahimalani; 14 September 1914; Hyderabad, Bombay Presidency, British India (present-day Pakistan)
- Died: 25 December 2007 (aged 93)
- Occupations: Film producer; Film director
- Organization: Sippy Films
- Spouse: Mohini Sippy
- Children: 5 (including Ramesh Sippy)
- Relatives: Rohan Sippy (grandson); Kiran Juneja (daughter-in-law)

Gopaldas Parmanand Sipahimalani (14 September 1914 — 25 December 2007), better known as G. P. Sippy, was an Indian film producer and director who worked in the Bollywood industry.

== Biography ==
Sippy was born in Sindh, British India (now in Pakistan) into a wealthy trading family. Sippy's father's name was Parmanand Sipahimalani and the family are Sindhi Hindus. The family was based in Karachi until 1947, when the partition of India took place and Pakistan was created. The entire province of Sindh became part of Pakistan. Most of the Hindus of Sindh were compelled to abandon their homes, lands and properties to go as refugees to India. This was the fate of the Sipahimalani family, whose wealth made them the target of particular spite and attack. Sippy and his wife Mohini were already the parents of two sons, and the entire family, including several other members, was compelled to abandon their home and property in Sindh and take refuge in India. G.P.Sippy was himself a lawyer. They moved to Mumbai (then known as Bombay) where they already had trading interests and some properties. Indeed, they were far from being penniless; they owned valuable properties in downtown Mumbai and also received partial compensation from the government for the properties they had abandoned in Pakistan. With these resources, Sippy decided to become a builder and property developer. He built and sold several buildings in Colaba and Churchgate, which are upscale neighbourhoods of downtown Bombay.

It was during the construction of Govind Mahal building on sea-facing Marine Lines that Sippy sold the construction rights to a Muslim builder and used the money to finance his first film, Sazaa. His friend Fali Mistry, a Parsi gentleman, directed the film, which starred Dev Anand and Nimmi. Released in 1951, the film met with moderate success, but the film bug had taken hold of Sippy by this time, and he was to make his career in that field. After that, he went on to become a film producer and made films under the banner of Sippy Films.

Sippy is known for producing several popular Bollywood blockbusters such as Seeta Aur Geeta (1972), Shaan (1980), Saagar (1985), Raju Ban Gaya Gentleman (1992) and his magnum opus, Sholay (along with his son Ramesh Sippy).

Sippy remained the President of the Film Federation of India (FFI) for many years, first 1972–73, 1985–86, and then 1988–92. He was the Chairman of the Film and TV Producers Guild of India for several years, and won the Filmfare Award in 1968 and 1982.

== Personal life ==
Sippy was married at a young age to Mohini Devi, a lady of his own community and similar background, in a match arranged by their families in the usual Indian manner. They had four sons (Ajit, Ramesh, Vijay and Suresh) and a daughter (Soni Uttamsingh).

Sippy was a race horse owner as well and one of his female horses was named after his hit film Woh Kaun Thi.

Sippy's second son, Ramesh Sippy, is a successful filmmaker, most famous for the all-time blockbuster hit Sholay (1975) and the hugely successful TV serial Buniyaad which was telecast in the 1980s. His other son Vijay was also active in the film industry, but success largely eluded him. Vijay died in 1998 by falling off the balcony of his house, shortly after his last film, Hameshaa had flopped, and it is suspected that he committed suicide. His death was a great blow to Sippy, who was also fated to witness the death of his only daughter Soni Uttamsingh.

Sippy died in 2007 at the age of 93.

== Filmography ==
=== Producer ===
- Hameshaa (1997)
- Zamaana Deewana (1995)
- Aatish: Feel the Fire (1994)
- Raju Ban Gaya Gentleman (1992)
- Patthar Ke Phool (1991)
- Bhrashtachar (1989)
- Saagar (1985)
- Shaan (1980)
- Ahsaas (1979)
- Trishna (1978)
- Sholay (1975)
- Seeta Aur Geeta (1972)
- Andaz (1971)
- Bandhan (1969)
- Brahmachari (1968/I)
- Mere Sanam (1965)
- Bhai-Bahen (1959)
- 12 O'Clock (1958)
- Shahenshah (1953)
- Sazaa (1951)

=== Director ===
- Mr. India (1961)
- Bhai-Bahen (1959)
- Light House (1958)
- Shrimati 420 (1956)
- Adl-e-Jehangir (1955)
- Marine Drive (1955)
