= Najma (1943 film) =

Indian film from 1943

- Theatrical release poster
- Directed by: Mehboob Khan
- Written by: Agha Jani Kashmiri
- Produced by: Mehboob Khan
- Starring: Ashok Kumar; Veena
- Cinematography: Faredoon Irani
- Music by: Rafiq Ghaznavi; Anjum Pilibhiti (lyrics)
- Production company: Mehboob Productions
- Release date: 30 July 1943
- Country: India
- Language: Hindi/Urdu

Najma

Najma (Hindi: नजमा) is a 1943 Indian film directed by Mehboob Khan and starring Ashok Kumar and Veena. The film's music is by Rafiq Ghaznavi and lyrics by Anjum Pilibhiti.

Najma was the first film under Mehboob Khan's Mehboob Productions banner. Mehboob Khan paid Ashok Kumar Rs. 1 lakh for his role in the film, a record at the time. Due to its financial success upon release, the film became a blueprint for Muslim socials that followed.

== Plot ==
Lucknow medical student Yusuf has fallen in love with Najma, the daughter of his wealthy neighbor, after seeing her only once. Encouraged by his friend Bedil, he decides to pursue her. Najma thinks he is too forward and tries to punish him by putting salt in his food at her family's Eid celebration, but accidentally serves it to his father Dr. Khan instead. Najma then falls in love with Yusuf, who has now become a doctor. Najam meets him secretly in the garden. Their romance is interrupted when Dr. Khan announces that he has betrothed his son to his cousin Raziya. Although Yusuf initially refuses to marry Raziya because she is an uneducated village girl and he loves Najma, Najma convinces him to marry Raziya to preserve his family's honor. Heartbroken, they both marry other people; Yusuf marries Raziya and Najma weds the wealthy Nawab Mukarram. Indian Muslim culture at that time demanded that a Nawab's daughter marry into another Nawab's family. Najma and Yusuf had kept it a secret love and never made it public, due to social class differences, that in fact they were secretly in love with each other. Raziya finds out about Yusuf's hidden love and becomes very jealous. Meanwhile, Yusuf sinks into depression and Najma becomes ill with worry over him. Mukarram overhears Raziya jealously berating Najma over her love for Yusuf and resolves to kill him. But Mukarram has a serious accident and Doctor Yusuf is the only one who can save his life. Yusuf saves Mukarram's life and assures him and Raziya that he does not wish to take Najma away. Giving up each other forever, Yusuf and Najma part.

== Cast ==
- Ashok Kumar as Yusuf Khan
- Sitara Devi as Raziya
- Veena as Najma
- Kumar as Mukarram
- Yakub as Bedil
- Majid as Nawab Rafatjah
- Shantari as Tilat
- Rajkumari Shukla as Mukarram's Mother
- Murad as Dr. Khan, Yusuf's father
- Laddan as Mir Banney
- Wasker as Nawab Nabbanc
- Bibibai as Najma's Mother
- Maheshar as Ahmed Hussain

== Themes ==
Najma emphasises the importance of education and the necessity for modern development within the Muslim community, but also portrays the value of family honor and upholding traditions like arranged marriage. The film's upper class Lahknawi protagonists live in an economically privileged world and follow the traditional tehzeeb etiquette of Lucknow. The film mainly deals with family relationships and the effects of tehzeeb on them. Many of these elements became the prototype for later Muslim social films which usually focused on male-female relationships in upper-class Muslim communities.
