= Amber (film) =

1952 film

- Song synopsis booklet cover
- Directed by: Jayant Desai
- Written by: Arjun Dev Rashk
- Screenplay by: Urmila Devi
- Story by: Dwarka Khosla; Bachoobhai Shukla
- Produced by: Seth Jagat Narain
- Starring: Nargis; Raj Kapoor; Agha; Bipin Gupta
- Cinematography: Saju Naik
- Edited by: Dharamvir
- Music by: Ghulam Mohammed
- Production company: Jagat Pictures
- Distributed by: Jagat Pictures
- Release date: 1952
- Running time: 140 minutes
- Country: India
- Language: Hindi

Amber (transl. The Sky), also called Ambar, is a 1952 Hindi costume action romance thriller film directed by Jayant Desai.

The story was by Dwarka Khosla and Bachoobhai Shukla, with dialogues by Munshi Sagar Hussain and Arjun Dev Rashk. The screenplay was credited to Uma Devi. The film was produced by Seth Jagat Narain for his banner, Jagat Pictures, with music by Ghulam Mohammed. The actress Tanuja was credited as Baby Tanuja and played the role of a young Nargis. The film starred Raj Kapoor, Nargis, Agha, Bipin Gupta, Vyas, Cuckoo, Helen and Samson.

== Plot ==
The story involves intrigue in a palace, a king blamed for a murder and a daughter avenging her father's death. Nargis plays Amber, out for revenge, while Raj Kapoor plays the man sent to save the king.

Amber (Baby Tanuja), a young orphaned tribal girl, stays with her maternal grandfather, who is the Chief. She learns that her father was a prince who had married her mother but was killed. The cause of the murder was unknown, and the killers were never caught. Her mother had committed suicide soon after. The grandfather sends her to the palace to stay with her paternal grandfather, the King (Bipin Gupta). The King comes to love Amber, and she grows up (Nargis) surrounded by love and luxury. However, she is let know through palace intrigue that her grandfather, the King, had her father killed. She decides to avenge her father's death by killing her grandfather. Ambar, on one of her outings, meets Raj (Raj Kapoor), and the two fall in love. Raj turns out to be a bandit, but his father is a loyal servant to the king. Raj's father fears that someone is going to harm the king, so he sends Raj to the palace. Raj arrives there pretending to be a teacher.

The King's minister, Diwanji (Ramesh Sinha) and his son Johar (Nayampally), are also plotting to kill the King and take over the kingdom. Raj, meanwhile, starts suspecting Amber of harbouring murderous intentions towards her grandfather. One night, intent on killing the King, Amber goes to his chambers. The Diwanji is already there with plans to kill the King, too; the ensuing chaos brings everyone to the royal chambers, and Amber is caught. Raj gathers an army and saves the King and Amber. Finally, everything is revealed with the Diwan and his son being found out as the real murderers of Amber's father, the Prince.

== Cast ==
- Raj Kapoor as Raj
- Nargis as Princess Amber
- Bipin Gupta as the Maharaja
- Agha as Veenu Bilasi
- Ramesh Sinha as Diwanji
- Nayampally as Johar
- B. M. Vyas as Raj's Father
- Tanuja as Young Amber
- Cuckoo as the singer, dancer
- Helen as a chorus singer and dancer
- Tun Tun
- Samson

== Soundtrack ==
=== Songlist ===
One of the popular songs from the film was "Hum Tum Yeh Bahar, Dekho Rang Laya Pyar", sung by Lata Mangeshkar and Mohammed Rafi. The music was composed by Ghulam Mohammed with lyrics written by Shakeel Badayuni. The playback singing was provided by Lata Mangeshkar, Mohammed Rafi and Shamshad Begum.

Song	Singer
"Hum Pyar Tum Hi Se Kartein Hain"	Lata Mangeshkar
"Tootegi Na Pyar Ki Dorr"	Lata Mangeshkar
"Dil Deke Sanam, Tumhe Pacchtai Hum, Mil Gaye Gham Hi Gham, Aur Khushi Na Mili"	Lata Mangeshkar
"Hum Tum Yeh Bahar, Dekho Rang Laya Pyar"	Lata Mangeshkar, Mohammed Rafi
"Shama Jali, Parwana Aaya, Shama Jali"	Lata Mangeshkar, Mohammed Rafi
"Duniya Mein Nahin Koi Yaar Wafadaar"	Lata Mangeshkar, Mohammed Rafi
"Chale Jana Tum Door, Bade Shauq Se Huzoor Haaye"	Mohammed Rafi
"Chhum Chakare Alar Yama Chhum Chakare"	Mohammed Rafi, Shamshad Begum
"Dhoom Dhadakka, Bolo Bolo Dhoom Dhadakka"	Mohammed Rafi, Shamshad Begum
"Dil Ki Sheeshmahal Mein Aaya Ek Matwala Chor"	Zohrabai Ambalewali, Shamshad Begum
