= Raja Jani =

- Poster
- Directed by: Mohan Sehgal
- Written by: S. Ali Raza
- Screenplay by: Nabendu Ghosh
- Story by: Nabendu Ghosh
- Produced by: Madan Mohla
- Starring: Dharmendra; Hema Malini; Premnath; Prem Chopra; Johnny Walker
- Cinematography: Madan Sinha
- Edited by: Lachchmandas
- Music by: Laxmikant–Pyarelal
- Production company: Seven Art Pictures
- Distributed by: Seven Art Pictures
- Release date: 1972
- Running time: 155 mins
- Country: India
- Language: Hindi

Raja Jani (transl. Raja and His Sweetheart) is a 1972 Indian Hindi-language film, produced by Madan Mohla, directed by Mohan Segal, and written by S. Ali Raza. The film stars Dharmendra, Hema Malini, Premnath, Prem Chopra, Johnny Walker, Durga Khote, Sajjan, Helen and Bindu. The music is by Laxmikant–Pyarelal. Raja Jani was the fourth highest-grossing film of the year. It is a remake of the 1965 Bengali film Rajkanya, which itself is loosely based on the 1956 American film Anastasia. It was itself remade in Tamil in 1983 as Adutha Varisu.

== Plot ==
Raj Kumar Singh "Raja" tries to find a girl who would be a perfect impostor to take the place of the missing princess Ratna. During an assassination of her parents she disappeared, and during the last ten years her grandmother, queen Rajmata has been looking for her. Raja finds a street dancer named Shanno, and finally, after extensive training concerning the etiquette, they can disguise and present her as the long lost princess in order to get the reward money for finding her. Shanno enters the house as the long-awaited princess. What Raja does not know is that Shanno is in fact the real princess.

== Cast ==
- Dharmendra as Raj Kumar Singh "Raja"
- Hema Malini as Ratna / Shanno
- Premnath as Diwan Gajendra Singh
- Prem Chopra as Pratap Bahadur Singh
- Johnny Walker as Imartilal
- Durga Khote as Rajmata
- Sajjan as Khairati
- Nadira as Shanno's foster mother
- Jankidas as Dr. Nigam
- C. S. Dubey as Bagla Seth's Servant
- Helen as Item Dancer (Guest Appearance)
- Suresh
- Manmohan as Latpat Seth (Guest Appearance)
- Bindu as Raja's Ex-Girlfriend (Guest Appearance)
- Rajan Haskar

== Soundtrack ==
The music composed by Laxmikant–Pyarelal.

Track listing
No.	Title	Singer(s)	Length
1.	"Jani O Jani"	Kishore Kumar
2.	"Aa Aaja Aaja"	Lata Mangeshkar
3.	"A B C D Chhodo"	Lata Mangeshkar
4.	"Duniya Ka Mela"	Lata Mangeshkar
5.	"Kitna Maza Aa Raha Hai"	Lata Mangeshkar
6.	"Mubarak Ho Tujhe Ae Dil"	Lata Mangeshkar
