= Sohni Mahiwal (1958 film) =

- Poster
- Directed by: Raja Nawathe
- Written by: Sardar Jafri
- Based on: Sohni Mahiwal
- Produced by: J. N. Choudhary
- Starring: Bharat Bhushan; Nimmi; Om Prakash
- Edited by: G.G.Mavekar
- Music by: Naushad
- Release date: 31 October 1958
- Country: India
- Language: Hindi

Sohni Mahiwal is a 1958 Indian Hindi-language historical romance film directed by Raja Nawathe and produced by J. N. Choudhary. The film stars Bharat Bhushan, Nimmi and Om Prakash in lead roles. The film's music is composed by Naushad. It is based on the tragic romance of Sohni Mahiwal.

== Cast ==
- Bharat Bhushan
- Nimmi
- Om Prakash
- Mukri
- Achala Sachdev
- M. Kumar
- Chand Burke
- Lotan

== Soundtrack ==
Sohni Mahiwal

Soundtrack album by Naushad
- Released: 1958
- Genre: Feature film soundtrack

Naushad chronology
Mother India (1957)	Sohni Mahiwal (1958)	Kohinoor (1960)

The score and soundtrack for the movie was composed by Naushad, with lyrics penned by Shakeel Badayuni. The soundtrack consists of 13 songs, featuring vocals by Mohammed Rafi, Lata Mangeshkar and Mahendra Kapoor.

#	Song	Singer	Raag
1	"Mahiwal's Call-Music"	Mohammed Rafi	
2	"Title Music"	Mahendra Kapoor	
3	"Panghat Pe Najariya Lad Gayi"	Lata Mangeshkar	Pahadi
4	"Teri Mehfil Tera Jalva"	Mohammed Rafi	
5	"Tumhare Sang Main Bhi Chaloongi"	Lata Mangeshkar	Bhairavi
6	"Aanewale Ko Aana Hoga"	Mohammed Rafi, Lata Mangeshkar	
7	"Duniya Hai Isika Naam"	Mohammed Rafi	
8	"Ae Mere Malik Mere Parwardigar"	Lata Mangeshkar	
9	"Mera Bichhda Yaar Mila De"	Mohammed Rafi, Lata Mangeshkar	
10	"Eid Ka Din Tere Bina Hai Pheeka"	Lata Mangeshkar, Mohammed Rafi	
11	"Aaj Galiyon Mein Teri Aaya Hai"	Mohammed Rafi	
12	"Milti Hai Bheekh Maula"	Lata Mangeshkar	
13	"Chand Chhupa Aur Tare Doobe"	Mahendra Kapoor	
