= Mehboob Studio =

Film and recording studio in Mumbai, India

- Type: Private
- Industry: Entertainment
- Founded: 1942; 84 years ago
- Founder: Mehboob Khan
- Headquarters: 100 Hill Road, Bandra (W), Mumbai, India
- Products: Mehboob Productions Private Limited
- Services: Film studio, recording studio

Mehboob Studio is an Indian film studio and recording studio in Bandra (W), Mumbai, founded in 1954 by director and producer Mehboob Khan, who previously owned Mehboob Productions (founded 1942), and is most known for films such as Mother India (1957), which won the Filmfare Awards for Best Film and Best Director and was a nominee for the Academy Award for Best Foreign Language Film.

It is spread over 20,000 square yards (4.2 acres) and includes five shooting stages. It soon become popular with directors such as Guru Dutt, Chetan Anand and Dev Anand. In the following decades it was used by Manmohan Desai extensively. A recording studio was added in the 1970s and both remain in use.

The studio was used from November 2010 to January 2011 for the first-ever exhibition of sculptor Anish Kapoor in India; the other part was held at the National Gallery of Modern Art, New Delhi.

== History ==
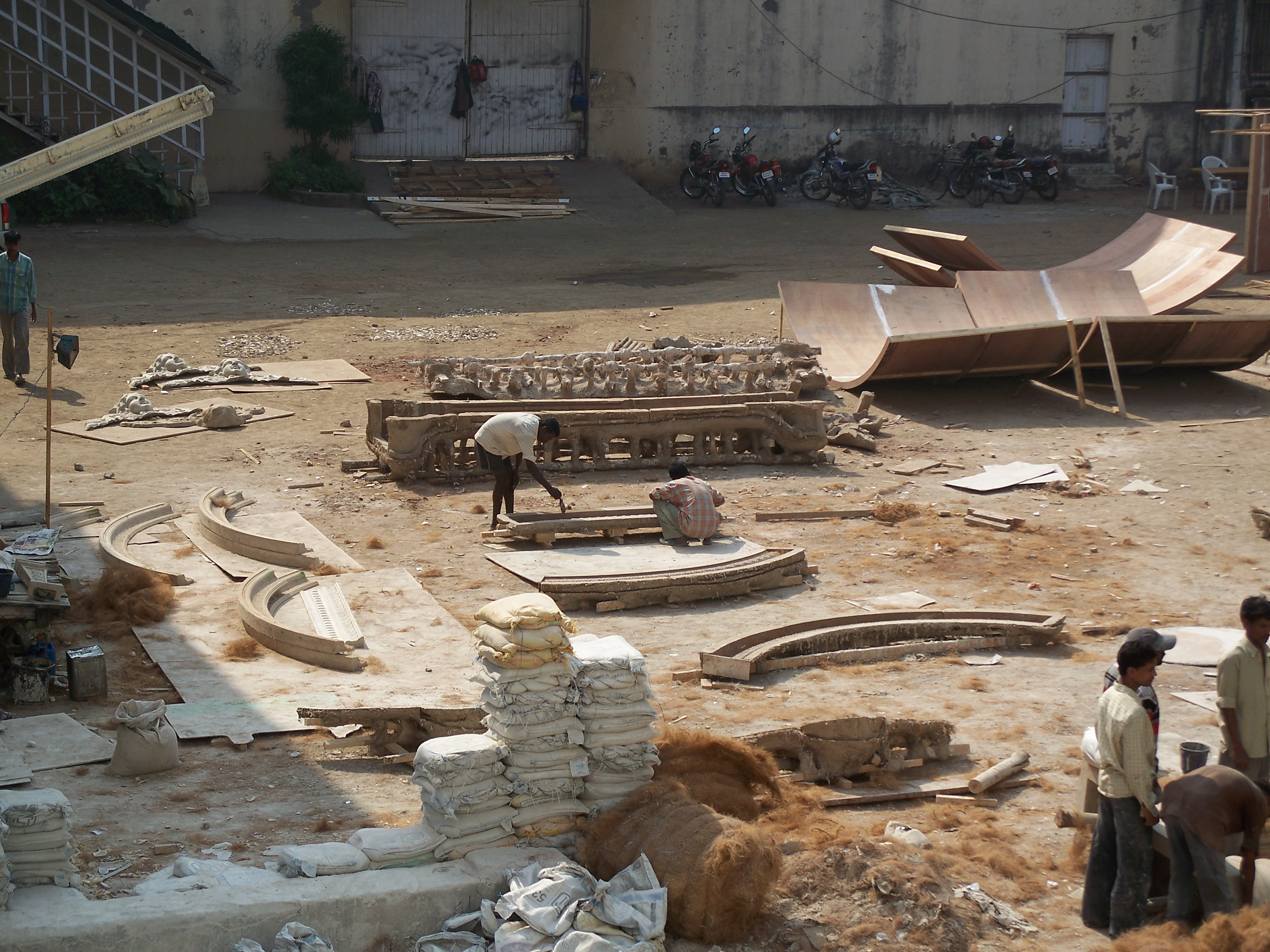
A film set in making at Mehboob Studio's courtyard, in 2007.

Director Mehboob Khan, who started his directorial journey in 1935, had already established Mehboob Productions in 1942 and had made hits such as Anmol Ghadi (1946) and Andaz (1949). He started looking for land closer to central Mumbai, compared with older studios such as Filmistan and Bombay Talkies, which were in far-flung Goregaon and Malad. Eventually, he settled for seaside Bandra, then a quiet and marshy area, long before the Reclamation that took place later. The plot, close to historic Mount Mary's Church was bought in 1951 from Jaffer Bhai, a local Bohra Muslim. A portion of the land housed a school run by a Parsi woman and the rest had farmland for vegetables. The construction was completed in 1954.

Mehboob had made Aan (1952) and was in the midst of shooting the Dilip Kumar starrer, Amar (1954), when the studio opened its doors. Mehboob shot his next two films, Paisa hi Paisa and Awaaz, but it was not until he made Mother India here in 1957, that he tasted both critical and cinematic success again. Mother India went on to receive an Academy Award for Best Foreign Language Film nomination and won the Best Film and Best Director Best Film Awards at that year's Filmfare Awards. A decade after its inception, Mehboob Studio was being preferred by stars and directors alike, as many stars lived close by. When Mehboob Khan was not shooting his films, it was leased out to other producers and directors.

Guru Dutt shot his iconic Kaagaz Ke Phool here, and actor-director Dev Anand shot many of his movies under the Navketan Films banner here, starting with Hum Dono and followed by Guide; he even maintained an office at the studio complex for 20 years.

Mehboob Khan could never recapture his mantle after the success of Mother India. His subsequent films flopped including his last one: Son of India (1962). When he died in 1964 at the age of 56, he left behind financial debts on his family. Son of India was the last film produced under the Mehboob Productions banner. The fortunes of the studio revived in the 1970s with the rights of Mother India reverting to the family, and a recording studio was added. In the coming decades it survived the onslaught of real estate development and a fire, which gutted stages 1 and 2 in December 2000.

== Commemorative postage stamp ==
As a part of Khan's birth centenary celebrations, the Indian postal department released a commemorative stamp at a function held at the studios in September 2007.

The studio saw its reinvention as an arts and cultural space when its stage no. 3 was used from for the first-ever exhibition of sculptor Anish Kapoor in India, November 2010–January 2011 and later became the venue for the Mahindra Blues Festival 5 and 6 February 2011 and 11 and 12 February 2012.

== Filmography at Mehboob Studio ==
Year	Film	Notes
1992	Tirangaa	
1957	Mother India	
1962	Hum Dono	
1962	Son of India	
1963	Sapni	
1964	Sangam	
1965	Guide	
1966	Amrapali	
1970	Johny Mera Naam	
2005	Black	
2006	Golmaal: Fun Unlimited	
2007	Aap Kaa Surroor	Producer
2009	De Dana Dan	
2010	Ethan's House	
2012	Housefull 2	
2012	Dabangg 2	
2013	Chennai Express	
2018	Alexa	
