= Akashdeep =

- Poster
- Directed by: Phani Majumdar
- Screenplay by: Nabendu Ghosh; Vishwamitter Adil (dialogue)
- Story by: Phani Majumdar
- Produced by: Phani Majumdar
- Starring: Dharmendra; Ashok Kumar; Nanda; Nimmi
- Cinematography: Roque M. Layton
- Edited by: G. G. Mayekar
- Music by: Chitragupta
- Release date: 1965
- Country: India
- Language: Hindi

Akashdeep is a 1965 Hindi film directed by Phani Majumdar. The film stars Dharmendra, Mehmood, Ashok Kumar, Nanda and Nimmi. The film's music was composed by Chitragupta in notable songs like "Dil Ka Diya Jala Ke Gaya", sung by Lata Mangeshkar.

== Cast ==
- Dharmendra As Tarun
- Mehmood As Madhu Gupta
- Ashok Kumar As Shankar Gupta
- Nanda As Roma Gupta
- Nimmi
- Shubha Khote As Sheela
- Chaman Puri
- Moni Chatterjee as Mama Of Ashok Kumar
- Chandrima Bhaduri as Vani Sinha
- Gopal Sehgal, in the song "Jaa Raha Hoon Main"
- Tarun Bose
- Achala Sachdev
- Keshto Mukherjee as Ramu
- Ramayan Tiwari

== Soundtrack ==
- "Dil Ka Diya Jala Ke Gaya" - Lata Mangeshkar
- "Gaya Ujala" - Manna Dey
- "Ghar Mein Na Chawal" - Manna Dey
- "Gudiya Banke Naacho" - Asha Bhosle & Usha Mangeshkar
- "Jaa Raha Hoon Main" - Asha Bhosle, Manna Dey & S. Balbir
- "Mile Tu Phir Jhuke Nahin" - Lata Mangeshkar
- "Mujhe Dard E Dil Ka" - Mohammad Rafi
- "Suniye Jaanam" - Lata Mangeshkar & Mahendra Kapoor
