= Bhai-Bhai (1956 Hindi film) =

- Directed by: M. V. Raman
- Written by: Rajendra Krishan
- Screenplay by: Javar Seetharaman
- Story by: C. V. Sridhar
- Produced by: A. V. Meiyappan
- Starring: Ashok Kumar; Kishore Kumar; Nimmi; Nirupa Roy; Om Prakash
- Cinematography: T. Muthuswamy
- Edited by: M. V. Raman; Ramamoorthy
- Music by: Madan Mohan
- Production company: AVM Productions
- Distributed by: AVM Productions
- Release date: 20 April 1956
- Running time: 120 minutes
- Country: India
- Language: Hindi

Bhai-Bhai (transl. Brothers) is a 1956 Indian Hindi-language drama film directed by M. V. Raman for A. V. M. Productions. It had screenplay by Javar Seetharaman, with Hindi screen adaptation of the Tamil film Ratha Paasam directed by C.V. Sridhar. The music director was Madan Mohan, with dialogues and lyrics written by Rajendra Krishan. One of the popular songs from the film was "Ae Dil Mujhe Bata De", sung by Geeta Dutt, "in an unabrasive fast tempo". The song became one of Madan Mohan's earliest hits, and the music of the film in journalist-author Bharatan's words, went on to "conquer the box office".

The film starred Ashok Kumar, who played the lead role, and Kishore Kumar (real-life brothers) as the two brothers, with the film being referred to as one of Kishore Kumar's prominent films. The cast included Nirupa Roy, who played the role of Ashok Kumar's "homely" wife, while Shyama played the "seductress". The film co-starred Nimmi, Om Prakash, David, Daisy Irani (credited as Roop Kumar) and Shivraj. Amrish Puri makes his acting debut with this film in an uncredited fleeting appearance.

The story is of two brothers, with the younger brother running away from home at an early age. The older brother gets entangled with another woman, leaving his wife and child at home. This situation leads to the meeting of the brothers, with the older one mending his errant ways.

Kannada remake of this movie Kavaleradu Kulavodu was made in 1964 directed by T. V. Singh Thakur. Starring Udaykumar, Jayanthi, Kalpana, T.N. Balakrishna and Ramesh.

== Plot ==
A rich businessman, Dayashankar Kumar, who is a widower, lives with his two young sons Ashok and Raj. When he catches the younger boy Raj stealing money, he punishes him and threatens to cut off his fingers. A frightened Raj runs away from home. Years pass and the older brother Ashok, becomes the owner of his father's business and property, running Superior Motors, which also extends to Bombay. Ashok is married to Lakshmi and is a caring and loving husband. They have a young son, Munna.

Ashok goes on business to Bombay to meet his branch manager Bulbul. He comes in contact with a young woman, Sangeeta B. Anand and is soon involved in an affair with her, intending to marry her. On his return home, Lakshmi finds him changed and is shocked when he decides to sell his entire business and move to Bombay. He tells her that he's leaving and gives Lakshmi some money. Lakshmi takes her son and follows her husband to Bombay, but both get lost in the big city.

Raj, the younger brother, now called Raja, had reached Bombay making his living as a pickpocket. He stays with a street dancer Rani and her mentor, Baba. Rani tries to get Raja to give up his thieving habits and is in love with him. Lakshmi and Munna accidentally meet Raja who gives them shelter. With Raja's help, Lakshmi finds Ashok, but is upset when she discovers him living with Sangeeta. Soon it's exposed that Sangeeta is married to Bulbul, who is a rogue and wanted to get money off Ashok. Lakshmi and Munna are reunited with a repentant Ashok. Their joy is doubled when they find that Raja is Ashok's younger brother.

== Cast ==
- Ashok Kumar as Ashok Kumar
- Kishore Kumar as Raj Kumar alias Raja
- Nimmi as Rani
- Nirupa Roy as Lakshmi
- Om Prakash as Bulbul
- Shyama as Sangeeta B. Anand
- David as Baba
- Daisy Irani (credited as Roop Kumar) as Munna
- Shivraj as Dayashankar Kumar
- Amrish Puri (uncredited cameo) as one of the street goons who tries to assault Lakshmi

== Soundtrack ==
The music was composed by Madan Mohan, while the lyrics by Rajendra Krishan. The singers were Kishore Kumar, Lata Mangeshkar, Mohammed Rafi, Geeta Dutt and Asha Bhosle.

The film had total 12 songs, which included seven Lata Mangeshkar solos, a duet with Kishore Kumar and Lata Mangeshkar, a song by Kishore Kumar, a song by Mohammed Rafi, and a song by Asha Bhosle, and the song, "Ae Dil Mujhe Bata De", sung by Geeta Dutt.

=== Song list ===
Song	Singer	Raga
"Mera Naam Abdul Rehman Pishtawala Main Hoon Pathan"	Kishore Kumar, Lata Mangeshkar	
"Mera Bangla Hai Sansar"	Kishore Kumar	
"Ae Dil Mujhe Bata De"	Geeta Dutt	
"Apna Hai Phir Bhi Apna"	Mohammed Rafi	
"Is Duniya Mein Sab Chor"	Lata Mangeshkar	
"Mera Chhota Sa Dekho Yeh Sansar Hai" (happy)	Lata Mangeshkar	
"Mera Chhota Sa Dekho Yeh Sansar Hai" (Sad)	Lata Mangeshkar	
"Bhagwan Jo Tu Hai"	Lata Mangeshkar	
"Sharabi Ja Ja Ja"	Lata Mangeshkar	
"Raja Jani Pyare"	Lata Mangeshkar	
"Kadar Jane Na"	Lata Mangeshkar	Bhairavi (Hindustani)
"Dil Teri Nazar Mein Atka Re Atka Re Atka"	Asha Bhosle	
