= Jaanwar (1982 film) =

- Poster
- Directed by: S. Ali Raza
- Written by: S. Ali Raza
- Produced by: Pardyuman Mohla
- Starring: Rajesh Khanna; Zeenat Aman; Pran; Pradeep Kumar; Prem Chopra; Nirupa Roy; Yogeeta Bali
- Cinematography: Jal Mistry
- Music by: Laxmikant–Pyarelal
- Distributed by: Shree Krishna International
- Release date: 24 December 1982
- Country: India
- Language: Hindi
- Box office: 3.5 crores

Jaanwar (lit. 'Animal') is an Indian Bollywood fantasy film directed by S. Ali Raza, released in 1982. The film stars Rajesh Khanna and Zeenat Aman as the main lead characters of the film. This film was of different genre than the other films of the pair. The film gives a social message of saving animals. The film takes place in a mythical kingdom and tells the tale of Raju who gets separated from his father and has to live in a village next to forest and of Rajkumari who as a newborn girl is forced by circumstances to be abandoned in a forest and subsequently is brought by animals.

== Plot ==
Murad is a king and he makes a wish that if a baby girl is born in his house, he will ensure that animals are not caged in his kingdom. The little Rajkumari is born afterwards to the Queen Veena and Murad keeps his promise of freeing the animals and visiting the temple of Eagle God with the newborn baby. Soon after the girl is born, without even allowing Veena to even get a glimpse of the newborn, Murad decides to take her on pilgrimage. On his way to the place via the forest, he is attacked by Kamal Kapoor, who is sent by Pradeep to steal the treasury and kill Murad so that he can be the King, being next in line after Murad and all the bodyguards of Murad are killed. Murad asks his elephant driver Ram Singh to take the baby away and give all the gold jewels in the elephant cast to the God Eagle. Ram Singh being an honest servant, decides to take the baby, but is attacked so he orders his elephant to take the cart and hand over the baby to God Eagle. At the palace, Pradeep receives word that the Rajkumari and the treasure have vanished, but that the king is dead. He announces that Ram Singh has betrayed his king and offers his baby girl Taramati to poor grieving Veena as compensation for her lost daughter. Ram Singh's wife (Nirupa Roy) flees with her young son Raju as their house is burned to the ground by Pradeep's men.

The elephant promptly takes the newborn and places it in the temple. The baby then is brought up by the animals of the forest and is taught animal language. She grows up as a sexy girl who has never met men and does not know to talk any language. Pradeep takes his brother's throne and makes Kamal his right-hand man. Kamal wants his son Mangal (Prem Chopra) to marry Pradeep's daughter Tara (Yogeeta Bali) in order to inherit the throne. They continue to search for the treasure which they had thought of stealing from Murad, but are unable to find it.

Later Mangal and Tara arrive in the forest for a hunting expedition and wound a tiger, causing it to ravage the surrounding villages in its pain. The fearful villagers ask Raju for his help in finding the angry tiger and putting it out of its and their misery. Now Tara decides to take along Raju with her for hunting so that no animal attacks them. But Raju tells Mangal and Tara that he is against hunting but still accompanies them. Tara shoots a deer even though Raju stops her and then Eagle God gets angry and a host of animals attack Taramati and Mangal. But just because of Raju, they are saved and as their jeep is destroyed by elephants they set up a tent. Tara becomes thirsty and asks for water and Raju says he would being it from the nearby river. There, when he goes, he sees a semi-clad young woman and is impressed with her looks. But he is bitten by a cobra and becomes unconscious. On seeing this that girl calls on the snake to remove the poison. This girl turns out to be none other than the baby girl who has been brought up by animals in the dense forest. The nameless young woman had never seen a man before and is amazed by the difference in his looks from other living beings she has seen. She even remembers his smell. When Raju regains consciousness, the girl hides. Later, the girl being attracted to Raju, visits the tent and Taramati gets afraid on seeing her, so he raises an alarm. Raju then, to find out who she was, goes in her search and then gets to meet that girl. Raju then starts interacting with her and asks why she wears banana leaves to cover her body and what is her name. Later, he realizes that the girl behaves like a monkey and that she does not know to talk like human beings. Being attracted to each other they keep meeting and fall in love.

When Raju introduces her to his mom in his village, his mom teaches her how to wear and behave like woman. Gradually, in months' time she learns the language in bits. Raju gives her the name Rajkumari. After few days, Nirupa sees the birthmark-eagles mark on Rajkumari's back. On seeing this, Nirupa Roy realizes that this girl brought up by animals has blessing of Eagle God and is none other than Murad's daughter. Meanwhile, Mangal on realizing that the girl who can speak with animals lives with Raju, he arranges for men to take the girl with him so that he can make use of her. But Raju opposes this and takes the girl back to the forest.

The rest of the story is about how Ram Singh proves his innocence, how he makes the Maharani Veena realize that this girl is her own long lost daughter, how Mangal changes the girl into a modern woman worthy of being princess and how Pradeep arranges for a treatment by which the girl forgets Raju and how Raju makes Rajkumari remember her past and how treasure is not allowed to be taken by Pradeep back to the kingdom.

== Cast ==
- Rajesh Khanna as Raju Singh
- Zeenat Aman as Rajkumari
- Pradeep Kumar as Maharaja Kunwar Singh
- Pran as Ram Singh
- Nirupa Roy as Durgavati Singh
- Yogeeta Bali as Taramati Singh
- Prem Chopra as Mangal Singh
- Veena Sapru
- Kamal Kapoor
- Om Shivpuri

== Soundtrack ==
The soundtrack was composed by Laxmikant-Pyarelal while the lyrics were written byMajrooh Sultanpuri.

Song	Singer
"Mehbooba Meri Mehbooba"	Kishore Kumar
"Insanon Se Jaanwar Achhe"	Kishore Kumar
"Pyar Ki Wadiyan De Rahi Hai"	Kishore Kumar
"Yeh Kaisa Nasha Sa Chhane Laga, Dil Geet Milan Ke"	Kishore Kumar, Asha Bhosle
"Dilbar Janam Janam"	Lata Mangeshkar

== Reception ==
It received three and a half stars in the Bollywood guide Collections. The film grossed 3 crores at the box office in 1982. It took two years in making 1980-82 and the muhurat was lavish with MGR switching on the camera. The movie was a hit.
