= Son of India (1962 film) =

- Film poster
- Directed by: Mehboob Khan
- Written by: Mehboob Khan
- Produced by: Mehboob Khan
- Starring: Kamaljit; Simi Garewal; Sajid Khan; Kumkum; Jayant
- Music by: Naushad
- Release date: 1962
- Country: India
- Language: Hindi

Son of India is a Bollywood film released in 1962. This film was written and directed by Mehboob Khan, starring Sajid Khan, Kamaljit, Simi Garewal, Jayant and Kumkum. The music was composed by Naushad and with Shakeel Badayuni as the lyricist. It was a spiritual successor to Mehboob Khan's previous film, Mother India (1957).

This movie's soundtrack consisted of some iconic Bollywood songs including the popular patriotic song titled "Nanha Munna Rahi Hoon Desh Ka Sipahi Hoon". The film was a box office bomb.

== Cast ==
- Sajid Khan
- Kamaljit as Kishore
- Simi Garewal as Lalita
- Kumkum as Kamla
- Jayant as Jung 'JB' Bahadur
- Ruby Mayers as Paro
- Kanhaiyalal as Paro's father
- Tun Tun as Gopal's foster mother
- Durga Khote as Head Nun
- Murad as Judge
- Mukri
- Bakhtawar Singh
- Kumar
- Lilian

== Box office ==
With a net collection of ₹60 lakh and a total gross of ₹1.2 crore, the film was declared a "Flop" by Box Office India.

== Soundtrack ==
Son of India

Soundtrack album by Naushad
- Released: 31 December 1962
- Genre: Feature film soundtrack
- Label: Saregama

Naushad chronology
Gunga Jumna (1961)	Son of India (1962)	Mere Mehboob (1963)

The soundtrack for the movie was composed by Naushad and lyrics penned by Shakeel Badayuni. The soundtrack consists of 9 songs, featuring vocals by Mohammed Rafi, Lata Mangeshkar, Geeta Dutt and Shanthi Mathur.

All lyrics are written by Shakeel Badayuni; all music is composed by Naushad.

Songs
No.	Title	Playback	Length
1.	"Aaj Chhedo Mohabbat Ki"	Lata Mangeshkar	3:57
2.	"Aaj Ki Taaza Khabar"	Shanti Mathur	3:58
3.	"Chal Diye Peeke Gham"	Lata Mangeshkar	3:05
4.	"Dil Todne Wale"	Lata Mangeshkar, Mohammed Rafi	4:28
5.	"Diya Na Bujhe Ri Aaj" (Raga Bhairavi)	Lata Mangeshkar, Chorus	3:14
6.	"Insan Tha Pehle Bandar"	Shanti Mathur	2:47
7.	"Mujhe Huzoor Tum Se"	Geeta Dutt	2:18
8.	"Nanha Munna Rahi Hoon"	Shanti Mathur, Chorus	4:13
9.	"Zindagi Aaj Mere Naam" (Raga Jaijaivanti)	Mohammed Rafi	3:48

== See also ==
- Mother India
