= Film Federation of India =

Organization

The Film Federation of India (FFI) is an apex body of the Indian film producers (around 18,000), distributors (around 20,000), exhibitors (around 12,000) and studio owners, headquartered in Mumbai.

The FFI selects the Indian official entry for the Academy Award for Best International Feature Film each year. In 2013 they had a shortlist of fourteen films.

Notable presidents of FFI include Mehboob Khan, G. P. Sippy, and J. Om Prakash.

== See also ==
- List of Indian submissions for the Academy Award for Best International Feature Film
- L. V. Prasad
