= Aan =

1952 film by Mehboob Khan

- Film poster
- Directed by: Mehboob Khan
- Written by: S. Ali Raza
- Story by: R. S. Choudhury
- Produced by: Mehboob Khan
- Starring: Dilip Kumar; Nimmi; Nadira; Premnath
- Cinematography: Faredoon A. Irani
- Edited by: Shamsudin Kadri
- Music by: Naushad
- Production company: Mehboob Productions
- Distributed by: Mehboob Productions
- Release date: 4 July 1952
- Running time: 161 minutes
- Country: India
- Language: Hindi
- Budget: ₹35 lakhs
- Box office: ₹3.5 crore

Aan

Aan (transl. Pride; also released as The Savage Princess) is a 1952 Indian adventure film, produced and directed by Mehboob Khan. It stars Dilip Kumar, Nimmi, Nadira (in her debut role) and Premnath.

It was India's first technicolor film, as it was shot in 16mm Gevacolour and was blown up in technicolor. It was the most expensive Indian film at the time subsequently becoming the highest grossing Indian film ever, both domestically and overseas, a record it held for several years.

Aan was the first Indian film to have a worldwide release in many countries, was subtitled in 17 languages and released in 28 countries, including the United Kingdom, United States, France, and Japan. The film also received critical acclaim in the British press at the time. In South India, it was also dubbed and released in Tamil with the same title.

== Plot ==
The plot centers around an Indian royal family, which consists of the Maharaj (Murad), his brother Shamsher Singh (Premnath) and sister Rajshree (Nadira). A local young man named Jai Tilak (Dilip Kumar) enters a contest to tame Princess Rajshree's horse, and after he is successful, Shamsher challenges Jai to a bout of fencing. Jai is declared the winner of the match after much dispute and Shamsher is enraged at losing to a poor villager. Jai falls in love with Rajshree and tries to woo her, but despite being attracted to him the princess's arrogance prevents her from revealing her true feelings.

Shamsher, who counted upon becoming the ruler after the Maharaj's death, becomes enraged when the Maharaj reveals that he plans to abolish the monarchy and make the kingdom a democracy.

Shamsher then plans to gain control of the kingdom by killing the Maharajah on the night before he is due to travel to England for a medical procedure. However, he is unsuccessful after the Maharajah escapes an attempt on his life by Shamsher's henchmen and disguises himself as a servant in his own palace.

Shamsher then sets his eyes on Mangala (Nimmi) who is a village girl and a childhood friend of Jai's. Mangala loves Jai, but her love is not reciprocated as he is in love with Princess Rajshree. Mangala is kidnapped by Shamsher Singh, who plans to keep her as his prisoner in his palace. Before he can assault her, Mangala commits suicide by drinking poison. Jai tries to kill Shamsher to avenge Mangala's death. After Shamsher apparently dies, Jai provokes Princess Rajshree to launch an attack on his village to avenge her brother's death. Jai manages to kidnap Rajshree in the confusion. He sets out to teach her a lesson by taking her to his village and forcing her to live as a peasant. Just when Rajshree begins to realize what a peasant's life is like and begins to admire Jai, Shamsher Singh reemerges and seeks to get revenge against Jai.

== Cast ==
- Dilip Kumar as Jai Tilak Hada
- Nimmi as Mangala
- Nadira as Princess Rajeshwari
- Premnath as Prince Shamsher Singh
- Sheela Naik as Maid of the Princess
- Mukri as Chandan
- Murad as Maharaja
- Cuckoo as Dancer
- Nilam Bai as Jai's Mother

== Production ==
This prestigious production was to be India's first full-length feature in Technicolor. The film was made with an extremely large budget. Dilip Kumar, Nimmi and Prem Nath, then at the height of their popularity and success, were quickly signed on for starring roles, but the second female lead proved more troublesome to cast. Initially, Nargis was cast but left the film to concentrate on her association with R. K. Studios. For a time, Madhubala was considered, with considerable lobbying from Dilip Kumar who was romantically involved with her at the time, but for reasons unknown, she was never cast. Finally Mehboob Khan decided to launch a newcomer and selected the then unknown Nadira and promoted her as his new star discovery.

When a first edit of the film was shown to the film's financiers and distributors, they objected that Nimmi's character died too early. This was due to Nimmi's vast popularity as an actress. Therefore, a lavish and extended dream sequence was filmed and edited in to give Nimmi more prominence and screen time in the film.

The production cost of the film was ₹35 lakh (equivalent to ₹37 crore or US$3.8 million in 2023). It was the most expensive Indian film ever at the time.

== Music ==
A major highlight of Aan is Naushad's music which was highly acclaimed. Both the music of film songs and the grand background score that was so innovative and played a key role in the box office success of this film. Reportedly, Naushad used a 100-piece orchestra while recording the music of this film, something unprecedented in those days. To create the sound effects that had better bass, Naushad had special rugs put on the walls of the sound studio. Finally, the film songs were mixed in London. Naushad worked very long hours for three whole months to complete this film's music. The symphony with the 100 musicians was much praised and even played on the BBC Radio.

Aan

Soundtrack album by Naushad
- Released: 1952
- Genre: Feature film soundtrack

Naushad chronology
Jadoo (1951)	Aan (1952)	Baiju Bawra (1952)

Hindi/Urdu lyrics were by Shakeel Badayuni

No.	Song	Singers	Length (m:ss)
1	"Maan Mera Ehsan, Arrey Nadaan"	Mohammed Rafi	02:48
2	"Dil Mein Chhupake Pyar Ka Toofan Le Chale"	Mohammed Rafi	02:55
3	"Takra Gaya Tumse Dil HI Toh Hai" (film version)	Mohammed Rafi	03:36
4	"Tujhe Kho Diya Hamne Paane Ke Baad"	Lata Mangeshkar	03:14
5	"Aaj Mere Man Mein Sakhi Baansri Bajaaye"	Lata Mangeshkar	03:55
6	"Mohabbat Choome Jinke Haath" (film version)	Mohammed Rafi & Shamshad Begum	03:36
7	"Gao Tarane Man Ke"	Mohammed Rafi, Lata Mangeshkar & Shamshad Begum	04:41
8	"Khelo Rang Hamare Sang"	Lata Mangeshkar & Shamshad Begum	04:18
9	"Aag Lagi Tan Man Mein"	Shamshad Begum	03:32
10	"Mein Rani Hoon Raja Ki"	Shamshad Begum	03:10
11	"Mohabbat Chume Jinke Haath" (cover version)	Hemant Kumar	03:35
12	"Takra Gaya Tumse Dil HI Toh Hai" (cover version)	Hemant Kumar	03:35

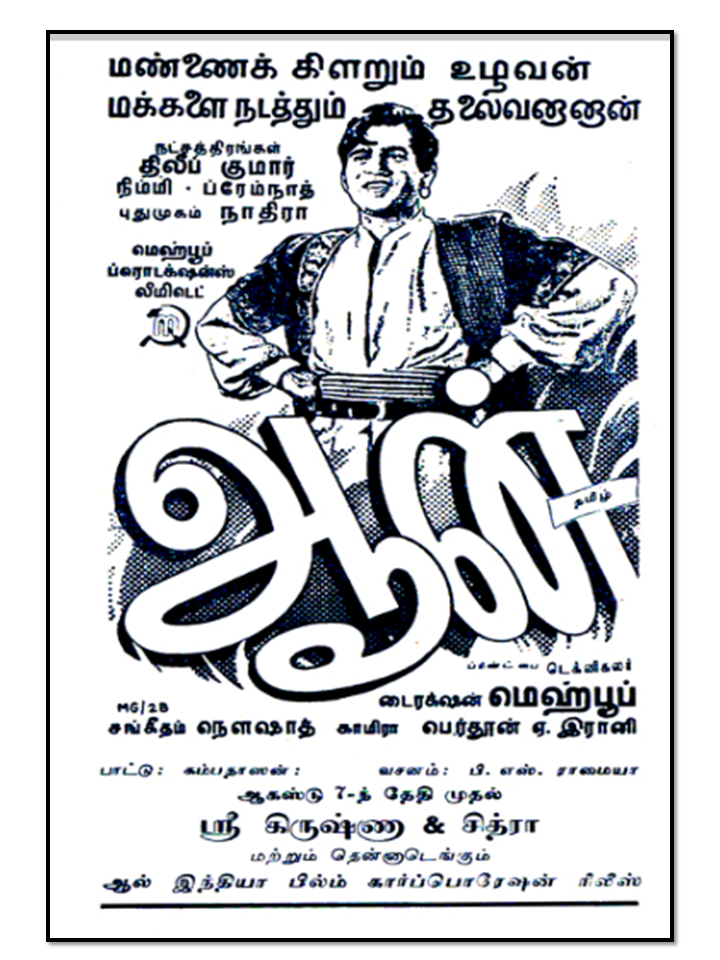
Aan Tamil-language film poster

The Tamil lyrics were by Kambadasan. Lata Mangeshkar and Shamshad Begum rendered the Tamil songs also. However, it appears that the lyricist did not approve of their diction, and so songs sung by Lata Mangeshkar were recorded again with M. S. Rajeswari and songs sung by Shamshad Begum were recorded with Soolamangalam Rajeswari. While the film had the original recordings, the records (plates) had both versions. So, there are 14 songs recorded on the gramophone records.

No.	Song	Singers	Length (m:ss)
1	"Yetriduvaai Arul Thaan"	S. M. Sarkar	02:48
2	"Manadhil Mei Kaadhal"	S. M. Sarkar	02:55
3	"Mohamuththam Tharum"	S. M. Sarkar	03:36
4	"Sandai Moondathuve"	S. M. Sarkar	03:44
5	"Izhandhen Unai Anbe"	Lata Mangeshkar	03:14
6	"Indru Endhan Nenjil Sakhi"	Lata Mangeshkar	03:55
4	"Izhandhen Unai Anbe"	M. S. Rajeswari	03:14
6	"Indru Endhan Nenjil Sakhi"	M. S. Rajeswari	03:55
8	"Paadu Singara Paadalai"	S. M. Sarkar, Lata Mangeshkar & Shamshad Begum	04:41
10	"Nagaru Nagaru Mel Jal Jal"	Lata Mangeshkar & Shamshad Begum	04:18
11	"Aah Sududhe En Maname" (1st version)	Shamshad Begum	03:32
12	"Naan Raniye Rajavin" (1st version)	Shamshad Begum	03:10
12	"Aah Sududhe En Maname" (2nd version)	Soolamangalam Rajalakshmi	03:32
14	"Naan Raaniye Rajavin" (2nd version)	Soolamangalam Rajalakshmi	03:10

== Release ==
=== International ===
Aan was the first Indian film to have a worldwide release in many countries with the English title - Savage Princess. It was subtitled in 17 languages, and released in 28 countries. Its distribution in the United Kingdom and Europe was handled by Alexander Korda. The film had a lavish London premiere, attended by Mehboob Khan, his wife Sardar Akhtar, and Nimmi. The English version was entitled Savage Princess. On the London trip, they met many Western film personalities, including Errol Flynn. When Flynn attempted to kiss Nimmi's hand, she pulled it away, exclaiming, "I am an Indian girl, you cannot do that!" The incident made the headlines, and the press raved about Nimmi as the "...unkissed girl of India". The premiere was also attended by the British prime minister Lord Attlee, among other Indian and British elites at the time.

Although Nimmi was not the romantic lead, she made a big impact on audiences, and her character, Mangala, emerged as the most popular in the film. This was to such an extent that, when the film was released dubbed in French in 1954, it was retitled Mangala, fille des Indes (Mangala, the Girl of India) and Nimmi was promoted as the main star of the film in the theatrical posters and trailers for the French language release. One reason for her popularity was the incident with Errol Flynn which made headlines. Nimmi further revealed in a 2013 interview, that at the London premiere of Aan, she received four serious offers from Hollywood, including from Cecil B. DeMille who greatly admired the production design and Mehboob's vision as a director. He was in fact, so impressed by the film, that he personally wrote a letter of commendation to Mehboob Khan praising the film and the performances of Nimmi, Dilip Kumar and Nadira in particular.

Aan was also released in Japan in January 1954, as the first Indian film to ever release in Japan. Aan was accepted by audiences there, and it earned a considerable profit in Japan. In 1995, the film had its Bangladeshi television premier on Bangladesh Television on the occasion of a personal visit of Dilip Kumar and Saira Banu to the country.

== Reception ==
=== Box office ===
Domestically in India, it was the highest grosser of 1952, grossing ₹2.5 crore ($5.88 million). (Note: 4.76 Indian rupees per US dollar from 1951 to 1965) Adjusted for inflation, this is equivalent to $71 million (₹486 crore). It was the highest-grossing film in India at the time, and the first to net ₹1.5 crore. It held the record for several years, until it was surpassed by Shree 420 (1955).

It was also an overseas success, earning considerable profit from overseas. In overseas markets, the film was released in 28 countries and earned ₹773,060 ($162,410). Adjusted for inflation, this is equivalent to $2.79 million (₹19 crore). In Japan, the film earned ¥2,386,032 in ten days following its release in January 1954, the highest for an Indian film in the territory at the time. Aan was the highest-gross Indian film overseas at the time, until it was surpassed by Awaara (1951) after its Soviet release in 1954.

Worldwide, the film grossed ₹3.2731 crore ($6,042,410). Adjusted for inflation, this is equivalent to ₹395 crore ($58 million). It was the highest-grossing Indian film ever at the time, up until it was surpassed by Awaara after its Soviet release in 1954.

=== Critical reception ===
Aan received critical acclaim in the British press at the time. The Times, for example, wrote a positive review of the film, comparing it favourably with Hollywood productions at the time. They stated that "Hollywood has nothing to reach up to handsome Dilip Kumar and seductive Nadira."

Hollywood producer Cecil B. DeMille himself wrote a letter to Mehboob Khan saying, "I believe it is quite possible to make pictures in your great country which will be understood and enjoyed by all nations without sacrificing the culture and customs of India. We look forward to the day when you will be regular contributors to our screen fare with many fine stories bringing the romance and magic of India."
