= Marine Drive (film) =

- Directed by: G. P. Sippy
- Starring: Ajit; Bina Rai; K. N. Singh; Johnny Walker
- Music by: N. Datta
- Release date: 1955
- Country: India
- Language: Hindi

Marine Drive is a 1955 Indian Hindi-language film, starring Ajit, Bina Rai in lead roles.

The film deals with the smuggling business and underworld crime.

It was the first film that G. P. Sippy released under his production house Sippy Films. Sahir Ludhianvi composed lyrics for the film and told Sippy that because Sippy did not drink, he would never understand the lyrics "Mujhko na koi hosh na gham, main nashe main hoon" (English: "Neither me nor any conscious sorrow, I'm drunk, I am") from the film.

== Cast ==
- Ajit as Ajit Prasad
- Bina Rai as Bina
- K. N. Singh as Mr. Khanna
- Johnny Walker as Johny
- Mohana Cabral as Dolly

== Soundtrack ==
Song	Singer
"Apne Khayalon Ko"	Lata Mangeshkar
"Main Nashe Mein Hoon"	Mohammed Rafi
"Mohabbat Yun Bhi Hoti Hai, Mohabbat Yun Bhi Hoti Hai"	Mohammed Rafi, Asha Bhosle
"Bata Ae Aasmanwale, Tere Bande Kidhar Jaye"	Mohammed Rafi, Asha Bhosle
"Tum Aur Hum Ho Saath Saath"	Asha Bhosle
"Raaten Jagake Sapne Sajake"	Asha Bhosle
"Main Hoon Phooljhadi"	Asha Bhosle
"Raat Sunsan Hai"	Asha Bhosle
