= Deedar (1951 film) =

- Poster
- Directed by: Nitin Bose
- Written by: Azm Bazidpuri
- Produced by: Rajendra Jain
- Starring: Nargis; Ashok Kumar; Dilip Kumar; Nimmi
- Cinematography: Dilip Gupta
- Edited by: Bimal Roy
- Music by: Naushad; Shakeel Badayuni (lyrics)
- Production company: Filmkar Productions Ltd.
- Distributed by: Filmkar Productions Ltd.
- Release date: March 16, 1951
- Running time: 130 minutes
- Country: India
- Language: Hindi

Deedar is a 1951 Hindi-language romantic musical film directed by Nitin Bose, starring Nargis, Ashok Kumar, Dilip Kumar and Nimmi. It is a story of unfulfilled love, where the hero's childhood love is separated from him due to class inequalities. It is one of noted tragedies made in early Hindi cinema. It became a popular film of the Golden era and further established Dilip Kumar as the "King of Tragedy".

Many years later, when Deedar was having a rerun at Mumbai theatres, actor Manoj Kumar asked director Raj Khosla to accompany him to the show. Thereafter, the story of Do Badan (1966) was written after reworking its story line, that film was also a hit. It is referred to repeatedly in the Vikram Seth's 1993 novel A Suitable Boy, in which people watching it burst into tears and people who can't get tickets start a riot. The film was remade in Tamil as Neengadha Ninaivu (1963) and in Turkish as Seven Unutmaz (1978).

== Cast ==
The whole film

- Nargis as Mala
- Ashok Kumar as Dr. Kishore
- Dilip Kumar as Shyamu
- Nimmi as Champa
- Murad
- Tabassum as Baby Mala
- Tun Tun as Rai's maidservant
- Surendra (as Surrender)
- Yakub as Bhalla
- Parikshit Sahni as Master Shyamu

== Soundtrack ==
The soundtrack was composed by the Naushad, with lyrics by Shakeel Badayuni. It featured notable singers such as Mohammed Rafi, Lata Mangeshkar, Shamshad Begum and G. M. Durrani. This was also amongst those few soundtracks in which the career of veteran Mohammed Rafi coincided with that of his idol G. M. Durrani.

Song	Singer
"Bachpan Ke Din Bhula Na Dena" (Part 1 - Happy)	Shamshad Begum, Lata Mangeshkar
"Bachpan Ke Din Bhula Na Dena" (Part 2 - Sad)	Shamshad Begum, Mohammed Rafi
"Bachpan Ke Din Bhula Na Dena" (Part 3 - Sad)	Mohammed Rafi
"Naseeb Dar Pe Tera Aazmane Aaya Hoon"	Mohammed Rafi
"Meri Kahani Bhulnewale"	Mohammed Rafi
"Huye Hum Jinke Liye Barbaad" (Part 1 - Sad)	Mohammed Rafi
"Huye Hum Jinke Liye Barbaad" (Part 2 - Happy)	Mohammed Rafi, Lata Mangeshkar
"Dekh Liya Maine Kismat Ka Tamasha"	Mohammed Rafi, Lata Mangeshkar
"Tu Kaun Hai Mera Kehde Balam"	Lata Mangeshkar
"Le Ja Meri Duayen Le Ja"	Lata Mangeshkar
"Duniya Ne Teri Duniyawale"	Lata Mangeshkar
"Chaman Mein Rakhe Veerana"	Shamshad Begum
"Nazar Phero Na Humse"	Shamshad Begum, G. M. Durrani

Several songs are set in Hindustani ragas: "Huye Hum Jinke Liye Barbaad" (Bhairavi), "Le Ja Meri Duayen Le Ja" (Desh), "Dekh Liya Maine Kismat Ka Tamasha" (Maand) and "Meri Kahani Bhulnewale" (Tilang).
