= Amar (1954 film) =

1954 film

- Theatrical release poster
- Directed by: Mehboob Khan
- Written by: Agha Jani Kashmiri; S. Ali Raza
- Story by: S. Ali Raza; Mehrish; S. K. Kalla; B. S. Ramaiah
- Produced by: Mehboob Khan
- Starring: Dilip Kumar; Madhubala; Nimmi; Jayant
- Cinematography: Faredoon A. Irani
- Edited by: Shamsudin Kadri
- Music by: Naushad
- Production company: Mehboob Productions
- Distributed by: Mehboob Productions
- Release date: 10 September 1954
- Country: India
- Language: Hindustani
- Box office: ₹7.5 million

Amar (transl. "Immortal") is a 1954 Indian Hindi-language romantic drama film produced and directed by Mehboob Khan. Dealing with the controversial subject of rape, the film revolves around the titular upper-class lawyer (Dilip Kumar), his feminist fiancé, the social worker Anju Roy (Madhubala), and Sonia (Nimmi), a poor milkmaid.

== Plot ==
Amarnath (Dilip Kumar), a well-known lawyer, is known for his sense of justice. One day, he meets Soniya (Nimmi), a milkwoman. She is awed by him and he finds her interesting. Amar's father wants him to get married and sends him Anju's (Madhubala) photograph. Anju has graduated from a foreign university and believes in justice and aiding the poor. Both she and Amar take a liking to each other and they are soon engaged. One night, after attending a local fair, Soniya is attacked by the local ruffian Shankar (Jayant) who wants to possess her at any cost. In a bid to escape him, Soniya runs heedlessly into Amar's house as a thunderstorm begins. In the lonely house, Amar ends up raping Soniya. Amar's conscience torments him as he tries to hide his misdeed and proceed with his engagement to Anju. Anju senses something is amiss, but cannot fathom what it is. Meanwhile, it is revealed that Soniya is pregnant. She refuses to name the father of her child and is cast out by the villagers as a fallen woman. Shankar manages to figure out who the father of Soniya's child is and wants to avenge her. He ends up dying by his own hands. Amar is accused of murdering him and the truth regarding him and Soniya comes out. The villagers eventually want to lynch Soniya. Anju supports and protects her. In the end, she ensures that Amar officially marries Soniya and leaves the village once her duty is done.

== Cast ==
- Dilip Kumar as Advocate Amarnath
- Madhubala as Anju Roy
- Nimmi as Sonia
- Jayant as Sankat
- Ulhas as Rai Saheb Mohanlal
- Mukri as Advocate
- Husn Banu
- Amar
- Siddiqui
- Murad as The Judge
- Pande

== Production ==
For the role of Anju Roy, Mehboob Khan had initially cast the actress Meena Kumari. However, due to some reasons, Kumari could not continue shooting and left the film. Following Kumari's departure, the shooting came to a halt and several actresses made unsuccessful tries to achieve the high-profile role. In late 1952, Raj Kapoor phoned Mehboob Khan requesting him to cast Nargis (whom Kapoor was dating then) in the role. However, at this time, there was a considerable amount of lobbying from Dilip Kumar's side also, to take Madhubala in the film. Finally, Khan had to refuse Kapoor and choose Madhubala on Kumar's insistence.

== Soundtrack ==
Amar

Soundtrack album by Naushad
- Released: 1954
- Genre: Feature film soundtrack

Naushad chronology
Deewana (1952)	Amar (1954)	Shabaab (1954)

The music was composed by Naushad with lyrics by Shakeel Badayuni.

Song	Singer(s)	Raag
Insaaf Ka Mandir Hai Ye Bhagavaan Ka Ghar Hai	Mohammed Rafi	Bhairavi (Hindustani)
Khamosh Hai Khewanhar Mera	Lata Mangeshkar	Bhairavi (Hindustani)
Tere Sadake Balam Na Kar Koi Gham	Lata Mangeshkar	Bhimpalasi
Na Milta Gham Tau Barbadi Ke Afsaane Kahan Jaate	Lata Mangeshkar	Yaman Kalyan
Jaane Vaale Se Mulaqat Na Hone Payi	Lata Mangeshkar	Yaman Kalyan
Naa Shikwa Hai Koyi Naa Koyi Gila Hai	Lata Mangeshkar	
Umangon Ko Sakhi Pi Ki Nagariyaa Kaise Le Jaaun	Lata Mangeshkar	
Uudi Uudi Chhaai Ghataa Jiyaa Laharaaye	Lata Mangeshkar	
Ik Bat Kahun Mere Piya Sun Le	Asha Bhosle	
Radha Ke Pyare Krishina Kanhai	Asha Bhosle	
Dance Music (Amar)	No	

== Release ==
Amar was released on 10 September 1954. It premiered at Liberty Cinema, Bombay, on 8 October 1954.

== Reception ==
=== Critical reception ===
Baburao Patel, the editor of Filmindia, called it "a brilliant picture with a gripping human story superbly directed and acted with flawless perfection. A masterpiece of film craft." Swatantrata magazine was highly impressed by Khan's direction and commented that "Mehboob can really be proud of this achievement." The magazine also defended Kumar's anti-hero role, quoting Jawaharlal Nehru as "films must amuse and at the same time educate."

Retrospectively in 2010, Deepak Mahaan of The Hindu lauded the film for its characterization of strong female protagonists and photography of rape scenes without any nudity. Mahaan added: "The black and white canvas lent the story a quiet dignity, appropriate to the ethical tussle between truth and desire, moral turpitude and justice." Khalid Mohammed noted that the protagonists were not portrayed as "snow-white paragons of virtue" but are instead shown with "human weaknesses", which is a rarity in Indian cinema.

Amar is stated to be the most favourite film of Mehboob Khan. Actor Naseeruddin Shah called Dilip Kumar's performance in Amar as one of his favourites. In 2019, Rachit Gupta of Filmfare mentioned Madhubala's portrayal of Anju among her finest performances.

=== Box office ===
Trade website Box Office India reported that Amar grossed ₹7 million (US$75,000) at the box office and was a below-average earner at box-office. Film historians attribute the film's commercial failure to its controversial subject matter.

== Awards ==
- Filmfare Best Sound Award for R. Kaushik

== Bibliography ==
- Akbar, Khatija (1997). Madhubala: Her Life, Her Films. UBS Publishers Distributors. ISBN 9788174761538.
- Lanba, Urmila (2012). Bollywood's Top 20: Superstars of Indian Cinema. Penguin Books. ISBN 9780670085729.
- Lanba, Urmila (2002). Life and Films of Dilip Kumar, the Thespian. Vision Books. ISBN 8170944961.
