= Daag (1952 film) =

1952 film

- Theatrical poster
- Directed by: Amiya Chakravarty
- Written by: Rajinder Singh Bedi
- Screenplay by: Amiya Chakravarty; Rajendra Shankar
- Story by: Amiya Chakravarty; Rajendra Shankar
- Produced by: Amiya Chakravarty
- Starring: Dilip Kumar; Nimmi
- Cinematography: Vastad Babasaheb
- Edited by: D. B. Joshi
- Music by: Shankar–Jaikishan
- Production companies: Mars & Movies Productions
- Distributed by: Mars & Movies Productions
- Release date: 4 July 1952
- Running time: 149 mins
- Country: India
- Language: Hindi
- Box office: ₹ 1,50,00,000

Daag (lit. 'The Stain') is a 1952 Indian Hindi romantic drama film produced and directed by Amiya Chakravarty. The film stars Dilip Kumar, Nimmi, along with Usha Kiran, Lalita Pawar, Kanhaiyalal, Leela Mishra in pivotal roles. The film's music is composed by Shankar–Jaikishan.

Madhubala was Chakravarty's first choice to play the female lead in the movie, but she left it because of hectic schedule. She was also shooting for Tarana and Sangdil at this time, which starred her alongside Kumar.

Dilip Kumar won the first ever Filmfare Award in the Best Actor category for his performance in this film. The Awards were instituted from 1954. The film fared well at the box office and was declared a hit, despite its heavy theme.

== Plot ==
Shankar (Dilip Kumar) and his mother live a life of poverty. To earn money, he makes and sells mud toys. Being the lone breadwinner of the family, he is unable to meet the needs. His debt starts rising steadily when he gets addicted to alcohol. He is attracted to Parvati (Nimmi), a poor neighbour who lives with her stepbrother Jagat Narayan, his wife and their daughter Pushpa (Usha Kiran). After an argument with his mother, Shankar leaves for the city, manages to give up drinking and earns a lot of money. He then returns home and pays off his mortgage. With new confidence, he proposes to marry Parvati. But he is then told that Parvati's marriage has been arranged elsewhere. Broken, he starts drinking again, and his mother also dies at this stage. He starts drinking heavily and starts walking on the path of self-destruction. The only thing which can save his life is Parvati's love. But her parents are an obstacle as they believe that the alcoholic Shankar can never become a good man in life. In a dramatic turn of events, however, Jagat Narayan agrees to get Parvati married to him. Shankar again manages to quit the drinking habit and the film finally concludes with a happy ending.

== Cast ==
- Dilip Kumar as Shankar
- Nimmi as Parvati "Paro"
- Usha Kiran as Pushpa "Pushpi"
- Lalita Pawar as Shankar's Mother
- Kanhaiyalal as Lala Jagatnarayan
- Leela Mishra as Mrs. Jagatnarayan
- C. S. Dubey as Heera
- Jawahar Kaul as Shyam Sundar
- Krishnakant as Money Lender
- Laxman Rao as Raghunath

== Soundtrack ==
While Shankar-Jaikishan provided the music direction, the lyrics were penned by :-

- Shailendra (Songs 3-8)
- Hasrat Jaipuri (Songs 1,2 and 9)

Sl No.	Song	Singer
1.	"Koi Nahin Mera Iss Duniya Mein..."	Talat Mahmood
2.	"Hum Dard Ke Maron Ka, Itna Hi Fasana Hai..."	Talat Mahmood
3.	"Ae Mere Dil Kahin Aur Chal, Gham Ki Duniya Se Dil Bhar Gaya..." (Part 1 - Male sad)	Talat Mahmood
4.	"Ae Mere Dil Kahin Aur Chal, Gham Ki Duniya Se Dil Bhar Gaya..." (Part 2 - Male Happy)	Talat Mahmood
5.	"Ae Mere Dil Kahin Aur Chal, Gham Ki Duniya Se Dil Bhar Gaya..." (Part 3 - Female Sad)	Lata Mangeshkar
6.	"Dekho Aaya Ye Kaisa Zamana, Yeh Duniya Ajayab Khana Re..."	Lata Mangeshkar
7.	"Laage Jabse Nain Laage, Ho Dil Toh Gaya Kya Jaane Ulfat Mein Kya Hoga Aage..."	Lata Mangeshkar
8.	"Preet Yeh Kaisi Bol Ri Duniya, Reet Yeh Kaisi Bol Duniya, Bol Ri Duniya Bol..."	Lata Mangeshkar
9.	"Kaahe Ko Der Lagayi Re, Aaye Na Ab Tak Balmaa..."	Lata Mangeshkar

Two songs are set in Hindustani ragas: "Ae Mere Dil Kahin Aur Chal" (all three versions, Bhairavi) and "Preet Yeh Kaisi Bol Ri Duniya" (Pahadi).

== Awards ==
- Filmfare Best Actor Award for Dilip Kumar.
