= Nimmi =

Indian actress (1933–2020)

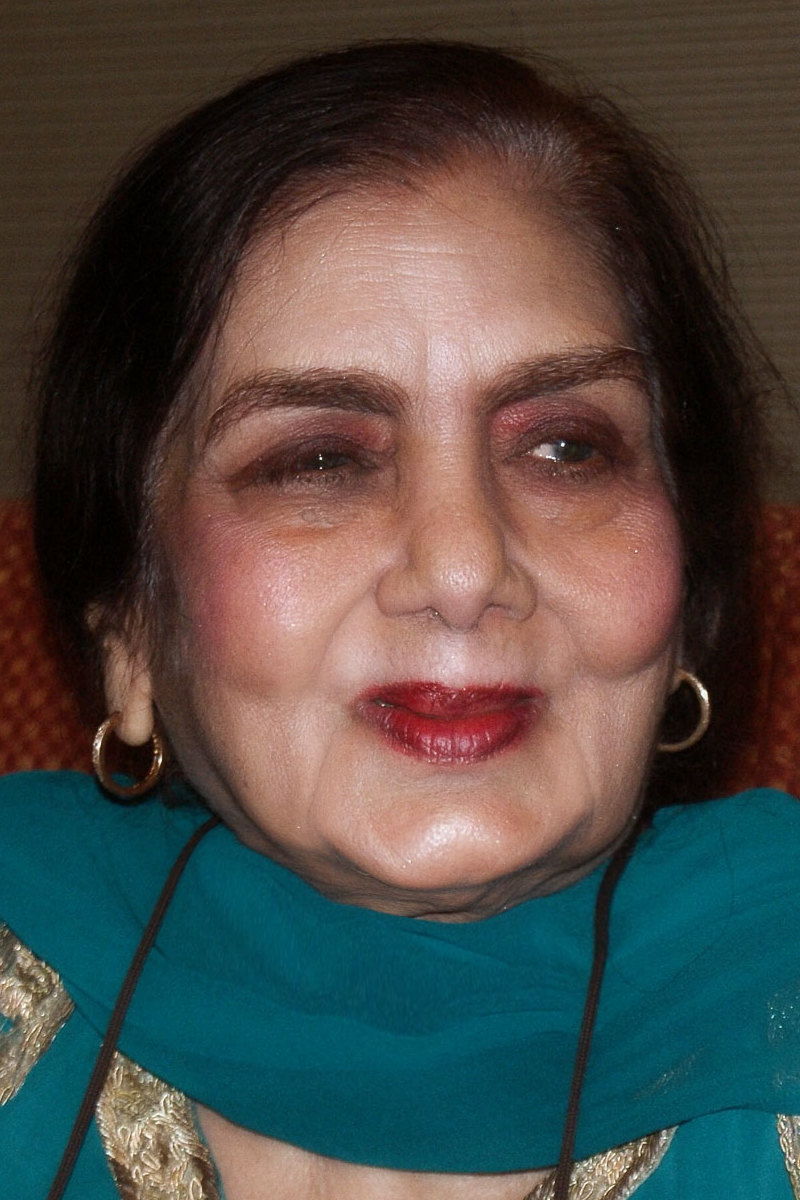
- Nimmi in 2015
- Born: Nawab Bano; 18 February 1933; Agra, United Provinces of Agra and Oudh, British India (present-day Uttar Pradesh, India)
- Died: 25 March 2020 (aged 87); Mumbai, Maharashtra, India
- Years active: 1949–1965
- Notable work: Barsaat (1949); Deedar (1951); Daag (1952); Aan (1952); Amar (1954); Uran Khatola (1955); Kundan (1955); Basant Bahar (1956)
- Spouse: S. Ali Raza (m. 1965; died 2007)

Nimmi (born as Nawab Bano; 18 February 1933 – 25 March 2020), was an Indian actress who worked in Hindi and Urdu films. Considered as one of the leading actresses of the "golden era" of Indian cinema, Nimmi was among the highest paid actresses of the 1950s.

Nimmi gained popularity by playing spirited village belle characters, but has also appeared in diverse genres such as fantasy and social films. She received critical acclaim for her performances inBarsaat (1949), Deedar (1951), Sazaa (1951), Aan (1952), Daag (1952), Amar (1954), Uran Khatola (1955), Kundan (1955) and Basant Bahar (1956).

== Early life and background ==
Nawab Bano was born in Agra. Her mother was a tawaif, singer and an actress, known as Wahidan. She was well connected within the film industry. Nimmi's father, Abdul Hakim, worked as a military contractor. Nimmi's birth forename of "Nawab" was given by her grandfather and "Bano," meaning princess, is conventionally added to a girl's name. As a young child, Nimmi had memories of visiting Bombay, and her mother being on good terms with Mehboob Khan and his family, who were prominent and influential within the movie-making business.

When Nimmi was 11 years old, her mother suddenly died. Her father lived in Meerut where he worked and had another family; by this time, his contact with Nimmi's mother was minimal. Nimmi was therefore sent to live in Abbottabad near Rawalpindi with her maternal grandmother. The partition of India happened in 1947, and Abbottabad went to Pakistan. Nimmi's grandmother moved to Mumbai (then known as Bombay) and settled in the household of her other daughter, Sitara Begum (known by the screen name Jyoti). Herself a former actress, Sitara was married to G. M. Durrani, a popular Indian playback singer, actor, and music director.

== Career ==
=== Debut ===
In 1948, via the connection with her mother Wahidan who had worked with him in the 1930s, the famous filmmaker Mehboob Khan, invited the young Nimmi to watch the making of his current production Andaz at Central Studios. She had shown an interest in movies and this was an opportunity to understand the film making process. On the sets of Andaz, Nimmi met Raj Kapoor, who was starring in the film. At that time, Raj Kapoor was filming his production of Barsaat (1949). Having already cast the famous actress Nargis in the female lead role, he was on the lookout for a young girl to play the second lead. After observing Nimmi's unaffected and shy behaviour as a guest on the sets of Andaz, he cast the teenaged Nimmi in Barsaat opposite the actor Prem Nath. Nimmi played the role of an innocent mountain shepherdess in love with a heartless city man. Barsaat, released in 1949, made movie history. It was a phenomenal commercial success. Despite the presence of established and popular stars Nargis, Raj Kapoor and Prem Nath, Nimmi had a very prominent and well-received role and was an instant hit with the audiences.

=== Rise to stardom ===
==== 1950s ====
She worked with top heroes like Raj Kapoor (Banwara), and Dev Anand (Sazaa, Aandhiyan). To her great advantage, Nimmi formed a very popular and dependable screen pair with Dilip Kumar, after the success of films like Deedar (1951) and Daag (1952). Aside from Nargis with whom she co-starred in Barsaat and Deedar, Nimmi also appeared alongside many notable leading ladies including Madhubala (Amar), Suraiya (Shama), Geeta Bali (Usha Kiran), and Meena Kumari (Char Dil Char Rahen). Nimmi was also a singer and sang her own songs in the film Bedardi (1951) in which she also acted. However, she never continued singing, and recorded songs only for this film.

Mehboob Khan cast her in Aan (1952). The film was made with an extremely large budget. Nimmi played one of the female leads. Such was Nimmi's popularity at this point that when a first edit of the film was shown to the film's financiers and distributors, they objected that Nimmi's character died too early. An extended dream sequence was added to give Nimmi more prominence and screen time in the film. Aan was one of the first Indian movies to have a worldwide release. The film had an extremely lavish London premiere which Nimmi attended. The English version was entitled Savage Princess. On the London trip, Nimmi met many western film personalities including Errol Flynn. When Flynn attempted to kiss her hand, she pulled it away, exclaiming, "I am an Indian girl, you cannot do that!" The incident made the headlines and the press raved about Nimmi as the "... unkissed girl of India".

Nimmi further revealed in a 2013 interview, that at the London premiere of Aan, she received four serious offers from Hollywood, including one from Cecil B. DeMille who greatly admired the film and Nimmi's performance. Nimmi declined these offers, choosing to focus on her flourishing career in India. After the great box-office success of Aan, India's first technicolor film, Mehboob Khan asked her to appear in his next film Amar (1954). Nimmi played a poor, milkmaid seduced by a lawyer (Dilip Kumar). The film also starred Madhubala as Kumar's wronged fiancée. Its controversial subject of rape was way ahead of its time and although the film was not a commercial success, Nimmi's intense performance and the film were applauded by critics. It remained the favorite film of Mehboob Khan amongst his own productions. She acted and turned producer with the popular film Danka (1954) which was released under her own production banner. Kundan (1955), produced by Sohrab Modi co-starring newcomer Sunil Dutt, gave Nimmi a memorable double role as mother and daughter. Her sensitive portrayal earned her further recognition as a talented and spirited actress. In Uran Khatola (1955), her last of five films with Dilip Kumar, she starred in one of the biggest box-office successes of her career.

Nimmi next had two big successes in 1956 with Basant Bahar and Bhai-Bhai. In 1957, at the age of 24, Nimmi received the critic's award for best actress for her role in Bhai Bhai. These films were also notable for her songs which were dubbed by Lata Mangeshkar. By this point, with a largely consistent run of success at the box-office, Nimmi had firmly established herself as one of the most bankable and popular leading ladies in Hindi cinema.

In the late 1950s, Nimmi worked with renowned directors Chetan Anand (Anjali ), K. A. Abbas (Char Dil Char Rahen) and Vijay Bhatt (Angulimala). Prepared to take risks, Nimmi took on controversial characterizations, such as the prostitute of Char Dil Char Raahen (1959). It was during this phase that Nimmi became very selective as she strove for better quality projects and roles. However, her judgment was sometimes questionable when she rejected films like B. R. Chopra's Sadhna (1958), and Woh Kaun Thi? (1963). Later both these film became big successes for Vyjayanthimala and Sadhana, respectively.

==== Completion of Love & God ====
At this point, Nimmi opted for early retirement and marriage, but not before investing her best efforts into one last film production. Director K. Asif had started his version of the Laila–Majnun love legend, Love and God even before completing his magnum opus Mughal-e-Azam (1960). Nimmi believed that Love & God would be a fitting swan song to her career and her claim to eternal fame just as Mughal-e-Azam had immortalised its leading lady, Madhubala. K. Asif had problems casting the male lead before finally selecting Guru Dutt as Nimmi's co-star. However, Guru Dutt's sudden and premature death put a halt to the film's shooting. Sanjeev Kumar was cast as his replacement but the film was shelved altogether when the director K. Asif died. Nimmi had retired from films for over two decades by the time K. Asif's widow Akhtar Asif released Love & God on 6 June 1986 in incomplete form.

== Personal life ==
In her interview with Irfan and Rajya Sabha TV, Nimmi recounted that she first saw a photo of her husband Ali Raza, himself a scriptwriter with Mehboob studios, during a shooting at Famous studio. Her hairdresser had shown her Raza's photo in the film magazine "Filmindia" and asked her why she did not want to marry him. She liked the idea as she had heard about Ali Raza. Soon, her co-actor Mukri also suggested the same. They acted as cupids, subsequently, their parents met, and then they were married. Thus, the match was arranged by the two families in the usual Indian way. The couple did not have children, and they were both deeply disappointed by this. They subsequently adopted Nimmi's sister's son, who now lives in Manchester. Her husband Ali Raza died in 2007.

== Legacy ==
Nimmi is considered among the highest paid actresses of the 1950s and leading actresses of Indian cinema. In 2022, she was placed in Outlook India's "75 Best Bollywood Actresses" list. Khalid Mohamed from The Quint noted, "The petite-framed, soft-spoken Nimmi’s forte was in incarnating roles in which she was heartbreakingly vulnerable, and was victimised by males." In an interview for Rajya Sabha TV in 2013, Nimmi recounted her complete Hindi film career, from her beginnings as a child in Agra, her first break in Barsaat to the current day, and her experiences during this time. For her contribution to Hindi films, Nimmi received the Living Legend Award at Kalakar Awards.

== Death ==
On 25 March 2020, she died at age 87. After a prolonged illness, she was taken to the Juhu hospital after complaining of being unable to breathe. That same evening, doctors confirmed she had died. She had been in and out of hospitals during the last year of her life.

== Filmography ==
Year	Film	Role	Notes
1949	Barsaat	Neila	Debut film
1950	Banwra		
1950	Jalte Deep		
1950	Raj Mukut / Raj Mukat / Rajmukut		
1950	Wafa		
1951	Badi Bahu		
1951	Bedardi		Also sang the song "Nanadiya Jaane Na De..." under the music direction of Roshan Lal Nagrath.
1951	Buzdil	Chandni	
1951	Deedar	Champa	
1951	Sabz Bagh		
1951	Sazaa	Asha	
1952	Aan	Mangala	Dubbed in English and released as The Savage Princess
1952	Aandhiyan	Rani	
1952	Daag	Parvati (Paro)	
1952	Usha-Kiran		
1953	Aabshar		
1953	Alif Laila		
1953	Dard-E-Dil		
1953	Hamdard		
1953	Mehmaan		
1954	Amar	Sonia	
1954	Danka		Also Producer
1954	Kasturi	Kasturi	
1954	Pyase Nain		
1955	Bhagwat Mahima		
1955	Kundan	Radha (mother) and Uma (daughter)	Dual Role
1955	Shikar		
1955	Society		
1955	Uran Khatola	Sohni	
1956	Basant Bahar	Gopi	
1956	Bhai-Bhai	Rani	
1956	Jayshri		
1956	Rajdhani	Naina Singh	
1957	Anjali	Mohini	Abridged version of Arpan (1957)
1957	Arpan	Mohini	
1957	Chhote Babu		
1958	Sohni Mahiwal	Sohni	
1959	Char Dil Char Rahen	Pyari	
1959	Pehli Raat	Bina	
1960	Angulimala	Maya	
1961	Shama	Shama	
1963	Mere Mehboob	Najma	
1964	Daal Me Kala	Manju	
1964	Pooja Ke Phool	Gauri	
1965	Aakash Deep	Bani	
1986	Love And God	Laila	Delayed release

== Sources ==
- Interview, Nimmi: "I have a dream to be Queen", The Indian Express Newspaper, Issue date: Friday, 30 May 1997. Copyright © 1997 Indian Express Newspapers (Bombay) Ltd.
- Reuben, Bunny. Mehboob: India's DeMille, South Asia Books
- Raheja, Dinesh. The Hundred Luminaries of Hindi Cinema, India Book House Publishers.
- Reuben, Bunny. Follywood Flashback, Indus publishers
- Rajadhyaksha, Ashish and Willemen, Paul. The Encyclopedia of Indian Cinema, Fitzroy Dearborn Publishers.
- Akbar, Khatija. Madhubala: Her Life, Her Films, New Delhi: UBS Publishers' Distributors
- Lanba, Urmila. The Life and Films of Dilip Kumar, Orient Paperbacks, India; New e. edition
- Ritu, Nanda. Raj Kapoor: His Life, His Films, Iskusstvo
