= Uran Khatola (film) =

1955 film

- Poster
- Directed by: S. U. Sunny
- Written by: Azm Bazidpuri
- Produced by: Naushad
- Starring: Dilip Kumar; Nimmi; Jeevan
- Cinematography: Jal Mistry
- Edited by: Vasant Borkar
- Music by: Naushad
- Production company: Sunny Art Productions
- Release date: 13 May 1955
- Country: India
- Language: Hindi

Uran Khatola (lit. 'Flying Bedstead') is a 1955 Indian Hindi-language romantic-drama film produced by music director Naushad and directed by S.U. Sunny.

The film stars Dilip Kumar, Nimmi, Jeevan and Tun Tun. The film's music was composed by Naushad. Songs were written by Shakeel Badayuni.

Madhubala was initially offered the film, but she refused due to her fluctuating health.

== Plot ==
Kashi travels by an ill-fated plane, which crashes on the outskirts of an isolated city that is ruled by women, who worship Sanga, their God. Kashi is rescued by pretty Soni and taken to her home, where she lives with her widowed dad, and brother, Hira. Since the roads are blocked, Kashi is unable to return home, and in order to continue to stay there, he must first obtain permission from the Raj Rani, the ultimate ruler. He meets with her and she finds him attractive and charming, and invites him to stay with her at her palace and sing for him, which he does. Kashi and Soni have given their hearts to each other, they meet secretly, with Soni disguised as a man, Shibu. The rest of the story follows how both Soni and Raj Rani try to make Kashi their own.

== Cast ==
- Dilip Kumar as Kashi
- Nimmi as Soni / Shibu
- Jeevan as Shanu
- Agha as Heera
- Tun Tun as Heera's girlfriend
- Suryakumari as Raj Rani

== Music ==
Uran Khatola

Soundtrack album by Naushad
- Released: 1954
- Genre: Feature film soundtrack

Naushad chronology
Shabaab (1954)	Uran Khatola (1955)	Mother India (1957)

The film's music was composed by Naushad. Vocalists were Mohammed Rafi and Lata Mangeshkar.

No.	Title	Singer(s)	Length
1.	"Chale Aaj Tum Jahaan Se, O Dur Ke Musaafir"	Mohammed Rafi	03:26
2.	"Na Ro Ae Dil"	Lata Mangeshkar	03:13
3.	"Haal-E-Dil Main Kya Kahoon" (Raga Bhairavi)	Lata Mangeshkar	03:25
4.	"Na Toofan Se Khelo"	Mohammed Rafi	03:30
5.	"Ghar Aaya Mehman Koi"	Lata Mangeshkar	03:15
6.	"Mera Salam Le Ja, Dil Kaa Payaam Le Ja"	Lata Mangeshkar	03:37
7.	"Hamare Dil Se Na Jana" (Raga Bihag)	Lata Mangeshkar	03:14
8.	"Mohabbat Ki Rahon Mein"	Mohammed Rafi	03:18
9.	"More Saiyan Ji Utrenge Paar, Nadya Dheeray Baho" (Raga Pilu)	Lata Mangeshkar	03:25
10.	"Dooba Tara Ummeedon Ka"	Lata Mangeshkar	03:34
11.	"Sitaron Ki Mehfil"	Lata Mangeshkar	03:31
Total length:			37:28
