= Shakeel Badayuni =

Indian lyricist (1916–1970)

- شکیل بدایونی
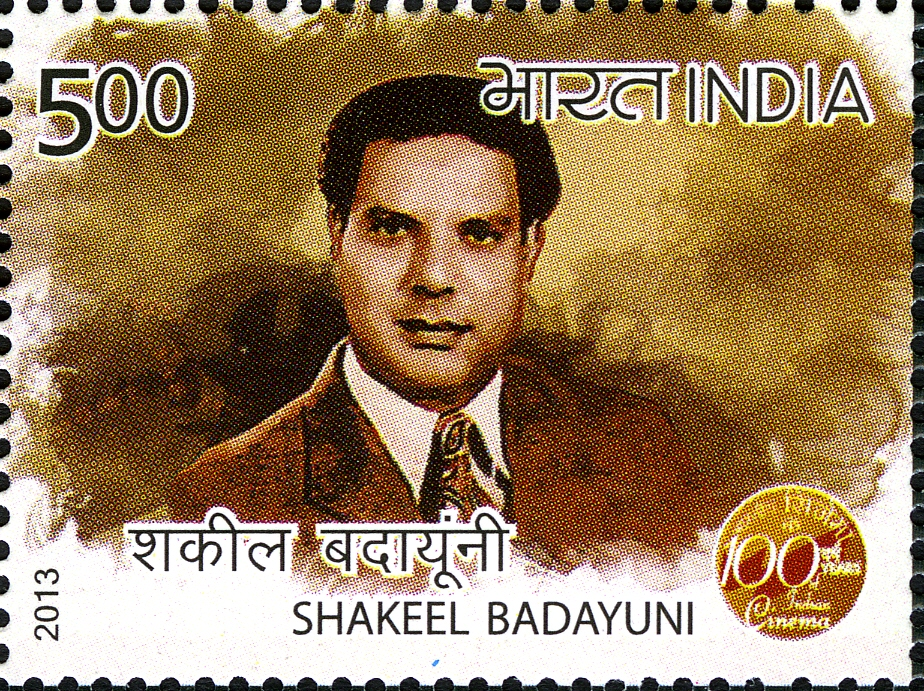
- Shakeel Badayuni on a 2013 stamp of India
- Born: Shakeel Ahmed; 3 August 1916; Badaun, United Provinces of Agra and Oudh, British India (present-day Uttar Pradesh, India)
- Died: 20 April 1970 (aged 53); Bombay, Maharashtra, India
- Occupation: Poet
- Writing career
- Pen name: Shakeel Badayuni
- Years active: 1946 – 1970
- Genres: Love, philosophy
- Notable awards: Filmfare Award for Best Lyricist in 1961, 1962 and 1963 during his career

Shakeel Badayuni (3 August 1916 – 20 April 1970) was an Indian Urdu poet, lyricist and songwriter in Hindi / Urdu language films.

== Early life ==
Shakeel Ahmed (pen name Shakeel Badayuni) was born on 3 August 1916 in Badaun, also called Badayun, Uttar Pradesh, British India. His father, Mohammed Jamaal Ahmed Sokhta Qadiri, wanted him to have a successful career, thus he arranged Arabic, Urdu, Persian, and Hindi tuition for Shakeel at home. His inclination towards poetry was not hereditary like other shayars. One of his distant relatives, Zia-ul-Qadiri Badayuni, was a religious shayar. Shakeel Masoodi was influenced by him and the contemporary environment of Badayun led him to poetry.

When he joined Aligarh Muslim University in 1936, he started participating in inter-college, inter-university mushairas, or poetry recitation symposiums, and won frequently. In 1940, he married Salma, who was his distant relative and had been living in a common house with him since childhood. However, the purdah system was strictly observed in their family and they were not close. After completing his BA degree, he moved to Delhi as a supply officer, but continued participating in mushairas, earning fame nationwide. Those were the days of shayars who wrote about the downtrodden sections of society, their emancipation, and the betterment of society. But Shakeel had an altogether different taste – his poetry was romantic and close to the heart. Shakeel used to say:

Mein Śhakīl Dil Kā Huun Tarjuman
Keh Mohabbatoṁ Kā Huun Rāzadān
Mujhē Fakhr Hai Mērī Śhāyarī
Mērī Zindagī Sē Judā Nahīn

During his Aligarh days, Badauni also started learning Urdu poetry formally from Hakim Abdul Waheed 'Ashk' Bijnori.

== Career ==
Shakeel moved to Bombay in 1946, to write songs for films. He met film producer, A.R. Kardar and music composer, Naushad Ali, who asked him to sum up his poetic skills in one line. Shakeel wrote, Hum Dard Ka Afsana Duniya Ko Suna Denge, Har Dil Main Mohabbat Ki Ek Aag Laga Dengey. Naushad immediately retained him for Kardar's film, Dard (1947). The songs of Dard proved to be very successful, especially Uma Devi (Tun Tun)'s Afsana Likh Rahi Hoon. Only a few are so lucky that they attain success in their first film, but Shakeel deserved success which started with Dard and continued on over the years.

Together, he and Naushad became one of the most sought – after composer/lyricist duos in the industry. Among the scores they churned out together, are those of Deedar (1951), Baiju Bawra (1952), Mother India (1957), and Mughal-e-Azam (1960), that stand out. Other films they scored together include Dulari (1949), Shabab (1954), Ganga Jamuna (1961), and Mere Mehboob (1963). Although Shakeel Badayuni worked most extensively with Naushad, he also collaborated with Ravi and Hemant Kumar. His lyrics for the song Husnwale Tera Jawab Nahin and Ravi's music score both won Filmfare Awards for the hit film Gharana. His other notable film with Ravi is Chaudhvin Ka Chand (1960), while Sahib Bibi Aur Ghulam (1962) is his biggest hit with Hemant Kumar. The title song from Chaudhvin Ka Chand, rendered by Mohammed Rafi, won Badayuni the Filmfare Award for Best Lyricist in 1961.

Shakeel penned numbers for around 89 films. In addition, he wrote many popular ghazals sung by Begum Akhtar, which are still sung by vocalists like Pankaj Udhas and others.

The Indian government had honoured him with the title Geet Kar-e-Azam.

Association with Naushad

Shakeel shared a close friendship with Naushad, Ravi, and Naushad's former assistant, Ghulam Mohammed, with whom he enjoyed his life to the fullest. Naushad used Shakeel as the lyricist for his tunes for most of his films for a period of 24 years. Baiju Bawra, which was a milestone in both of their careers, was supposed to go to Kavi Pradeep. Vijay Bhatt, the director of the movie was insistent on using Kavi Pradeep as the lyricist, since the film was supposed to have many devotional songs. Naushad requested Vijay Bhatt to hear the lyrics written by Shakeel. Vijay Bhatt agreed.

When Shakeel Badayuni was diagnosed with tuberculosis, he was put up in a sanatorium in Panchgani for treatment. Naushad knowing that his financial condition was not good, took three films to him, having the lyrics written in the sanatorium, and got him a payment of nearly ten times more than his normal fees.

Association with Ravi

Shakeel also wrote many songs for music director Ravi Sharma. Prominent amongst them were Chaudhvin Ka Chand (1960), Gharana (1961), Ghunghat, Grahasti (1963), Nartaki (1963), as well as Phool Aur Patthar and Do Badan (both released in 1966).

Association with Hemant Kumar

Shakeel wrote for Hemant Kumar for movies like Bees Saal Baad (1962), Sahib Bibi Aur Ghulam (1962), Bin Badal Barsaat (1963 film).

Association with S.D. Burman

Shakeel penned lyrics for the tunes of S.D. Burman for movies Kaise Kahoon & Benazir.

Others

C. Ramachandra – Zindagi Aur Maut, Wahan Ke Log.

Roshan – Bedaag, Noorjahan.

== Personal life and death ==
Shakeel Badayuni succumbed to diabetes complications at the age of fifty-three, on 20 April 1970, at Bombay Hospital leaving behind his wife, two sons and two daughters. One daughter, Najma, died soon afterwards, while still a college student. His elder son Javed and grandson Zeeshan work in the travel and tourism industry. His other son's name is Tariq. Shakeel's friends Ahmed Zakaria and Rangoonwala formed a trust called Yaad-e-Shakeel after his death and this trust became the source of some income for his bereaved family.

Shakeel loved to play badminton, go on picnics and hunting trips and fly kites with his friends from the industry, Naushad and Mohammed Rafi. Sometimes Johnny Walker would join them in kite-flying competitions. Dilip Kumar, writers Wajahat Mirza, Khumar Barabankvi and Azm Bazidpuri were among Shakeel's other close friends within the industry.

== Popular songs ==
Badayuni penned several memorable songs in his career. Some of his popular works include the musical Baiju Bawra (1952), historical epic Mughal-e-Azam (1960) and social Sahib Bibi Aur Ghulam (1962).

1. Suhani Raat Dhal Chuki, Na Janay Tum Kab Aao Gay (Dulari) (1949)
2. Man Tarpat Hari Darshan Ko Aaj (Baiju Bawra) (1952)
3. O Duniya Ke Rakhwale (Baiju Bawra) (1952)
4. Madhuban Me Radhika Naache Re (Kohinoor) (1960)
5. Pyar Kiya To Darna Kya (Mughal- E- Azam) (1960)
6. Chaudvin Ka Chand Ho (Chaudvin Ka Chand) (1960)
7. Dil Laga Kar Hum Ye Samjhe (Zindagi Aur Maut) (1965)
8. Yeh Zindagi Ke Mele Dunya Mein Kum Na Hongay, Afsos Hum Na Honge (Mela) (1948)
9. Hue Hum Jinke Liye Barbad (Deedar) (1951)
10. Maan Mera Ehsaan Aray Nadaan (Aan) (1952)
11. Tere Koche Mein Armanoo (Dillagi) (1949)
12. Milte Hee Ankhain Dil Hua Deewana Kisi Ka (Babul) (1950)
13. Mere Mehboob Tujhe Meri Mohabbat Ki Qasam (Mere Mehboob) (1963)
14. Jane Bahaar Husn Tera Bemisaal Hai (Pyar Kiya To Darna Kya) (1963)
15. Ek Shahenshah Ne Banwa Ke Haseen Taj Mahal (Leader) (1964)
16. Koi Saagar Dil Ko (Dil Diya Dard Liya) (1966)
17. Beqarar Kar Ke Humein Yun Na Jaiye (Bees Saal Baad) (1962)
18. Lo Aa Gai Unki Yaad, Woh Nahin Aaye (Do Badan) (1966)
19. Na Jao Saiyaan Chhuda Ke Baiyyan (Sahib Bibi Aur Ghulaam) (1962)
20. Meri Baat Rahi Mere Man Me (Sahi Bibi Aur Ghulam) (1962)
21. Aaj Puraani Raahon Se Koi Mujhe Awaz Na De (Aadmi) (1968)
22. Jab Dil Se Dil Takrata Hai (Sunghursh)
23. Ek Baar Zara Phir Keh Do Bin Badal Barsaat (1963)
24. Tumhe Paa Ke Hum Ne (Gehra Daag)
25. Zindagi Tu Jhoom Le Zara (Kaise Kahoon) (1964)

== Awards ==
- 1961 Filmfare Best Lyricist Award for the song Chaudvin ka chand ho in the film Chaudhvin Ka Chand (1960)
- 1962 Filmfare Best Lyricist Award for the song husnwale tera jawab nahin in the film Gharana (1961)
- 1963 Filmfare Best Lyricist Award for the song Kahin Deep Jale in the film Bees Saal Baad (1962)

== Government recognition ==
A postage stamp, bearing his face, was released by India Post to honour him on 3 May 2013.

== Filmography ==
Year	Film	Songs written	Music Director	Notes
1947	Dard	10 (All)	Naushad Ali	Debut film
1947	Natak	4	Naushad Ali	
1947	Shanti	11 (All)	B. S. Thakur	
1948	Anokhi Ada	10	Naushad Ali	
1948	Grahasti	2	Ghulam Mohammed	
1948	Kajal		Ghulam Mohammed	
1948	Mela	12 (All)	Naushad Ali	
1948	Pugree	8	Ghulam Mohammed	
1949	Chandni Raat	10 (All)	Naushad Ali	
1949	Char Din	10 (All)	Shyam Sundar Gaba	
1949	Dil Ki Basti	4	Ghulam Mohammed	
1949	Dillagi	12 (All)	Naushad Ali	
1949	Dulari	12 (All)	Naushad Ali	
1949	Paras	9 (All)	Ghulam Mohammed	
1949	Shair	10 (All)	Ghulam Mohammed	
1949	Singaar	3	Khwaja Khurshid Anwar	
1950	Babul	12 (All)	Naushad Ali	
1950	Dastan	9 (All)	Naushad Ali	
1950	Jan Pahechan	9 (All)	Khemchand Prakash and Manna Dey (separately)	
1950	Kunwara Pati	2	Mohammed Ibrahim and Saraswati Devi	
1950	Pardes	9 (All)	Ghulam Mohammed	
1951	Deedar	12 (All)	Naushad Ali	
1951	Jadoo	9 (All)	Naushad Ali	
1951	Lachak	1	Moti Ram	
1951	Nazneen	8 (All)	Ghulam Mohammed	
1952	Aan	11 (All)	Naushad Ali	
1952	Ajeeb Larki	10 (All)	Ghulam Mohammed	
1952	Amber	10 (All)	Ghulam Mohammed	
1952	Baiju Bawra	13 (All)	Naushad Ali	
1952	Diwana	8 (All)	Naushad Ali	
1952	Sheesha	4	Ghulam Mohammed	
1953	Dil-e-Nadaan	9 (All)	Ghulam Mohammed	
1953	Gauhar	6 (All)	Ghulam Mohammed	
1953	Hazaar Raten	10 (All)	Ghulam Mohammed	
1953	Laila Majnu	13	Ghulam Mohammed and Sardar Malik (separately)	
1953	Rail Ka Dibba	6 (All)	Ghulam Mohammed	
1954	Amar	10 (All)	Naushad Ali	
1954	Chor Bazar	6 (All)	Sardar Malik	
1954	Mirza Ghalib	3	Ghulam Mohammed	
1954	Shabaab	15 (All)	Naushad Ali	
1955	Hoor-e-Arab	8 (All)	Ghulam Mohammed and Sardar Malik (separately)	
1955	Kundan	10 (All)	Ghulam Mohammed	
1955	Rukhsana	2	Sajjad Hussain	
1955	Sitara	8 (All)	Ghulam Mohammed	
1955	Uran Khatola	12 (All)	Naushad Ali	
1957	Mother India	12 (All)	Naushad Ali	
1957	Pak Daman	11 (All)	Ghulam Mohammed	Also appeared on-screen as himself reciting his poetry.
1958	Maalik	8 (All)	Ghulam Mohammed	
1958	Sohni Mahiwal	11 (All)	Naushad Ali	
1960	Chaudhvin Ka Chand	10 (All)	Ravi Shankar Sharma	
1960	Ghunghat	10 (All)	Ravi Shankar Sharma	
1960	Kohinoor	10 (All)	Naushad Ali	
1960	Mughal-e-Azam	12 (All)	Naushad Ali	
1961	Gharana	9 (All)	Ravi Shankar Sharma	
1961	Gunga Jumna	8 (All)	Naushad Ali	
1961	Wanted	7 (All)	Ravi Shankar Sharma	
1962	Bees Saal Baad	5 (All)	Hemant Kumar	
1962	Sahib Bibi Aur Ghulam	9 (All)	Hemant Kumar	
1962	Son Of India	9 (All)	Naushad Ali	
1963	Bin Badal Barsaat	9 (All)	Hemant Kumar	
1963	Gehra Daag	6 (All)	Ravi Shankar Sharma	
1963	Kaun Apna Kaun Paraya	6 (All)	Ravi Shankar Sharma	
1963	Mere Mehboob	9 (All)	Naushad Ali	
1963	Mulzim	7 (All)	Ravi Shankar Sharma	
1963	Nartakee	8 (All)	Ravi Shankar Sharma	
1963	Pyaar Kiya Toh Darna Kya	9 (All)	Ravi Shankar Sharma	
1964	Benazir	11 (All)	Sachin Dev Burman	
1964	Door Ki Awaz	9 (All)	Ravi Shankar Sharma	
1964	Kaise Kahoon	7 (All)	Sachin Dev Burman	
1964	Leader	8 (All)	Naushad Ali	
1965	Bedaag	6	Roshan Lal Nagrath	
1965	Zindagi Aur Maut	6 (All)	Ramchandra Narhar Chitalkar	
1966	Dil Diya Dard Liya	8 (All)	Naushad Ali	
1966	Do Badan	6 (All)	Ravi Shankar Sharma	
1966	Phool Aur Patthar	6 (All)	Ravi Shankar Sharma	
1967	Aurat	6 (All)	Ravi Shankar Sharma	
1967	Noor Jehan	8 (All)	Roshan Lal Nagrath	
1967	Palki	9 (All)	Naushad Ali	
1967	Ram Aur Shyam	7 (All)	Naushad Ali	
1967	Wahan Ke Log	5 (All)	Ramchandra Narhar Chitalkar	
1968	Aadmi	6 (All)	Naushad Ali	
1968	Baazi	5 (All)	Kalyanji-Anandji	
1968	Sunghursh	7 (All)	Naushad Ali	
1969	Beti	8 (All)	Sonik-Omi	
1969	Mr. Murder	3	Sonik-Omi	
1971	Umeed	7 (All)	Ravi Shankar Sharma	Posthumous release
1973	Pyaar Ka Rishta	3	Shankar-Jaikishan	Posthumous release
1974	Jurm Aur Sazaa	1	Laxmikant-Pyarelal	Posthumous release
1982	Jogi	4	Ravi Shankar Sharma	Posthumous release
