= Murad (actor) =

Indian film actor (1911–1997)

- Born: 24 September 1911; Rampur, Rampur State, British India
- Died: 24 April 1997 (aged 85); Mumbai, Maharashtra, India
- Occupation: Actor
- Years active: 1943 – 1990
- Known for: Character Actor (Supporting Actor)
- Children: 4, including actor Raza Murad
- Relatives: Sonam (granddaughter); Sanober Kabir (granddaughter)

Hamid Ali Khan Murad (24 September 1911 – 24 April 1997), known simply as Murad, was an Indian character actor who appeared in more than 200 Hindi language films from the early 1940s through to the end of the 1980s, playing character roles of a father, police officer, judge and an emperor.

His son Raza Murad is also an actor in the Hindi film industry who is known for playing mostly villain roles. His niece is actress Zeenat Aman and his granddaughters are actresses Sonam and Sanober Kabir.

== Early life ==
Murad was born on 24 September 1911 in Rampur, Uttar Pradesh, British India. He studied at Minto Circle (STS High School), Aligarh Muslim University.

== Career ==
Murad's career began in the early 1940s, when he made his acting debut in the 1943 film Najma which was directed by Mehboob Khan. He became a regular fixture in director Mehboob Khan's films such as Anmol Ghadi (1946), Andaz (1949), Aan (1952) and Amar (1954). His other notable film roles included Do Bigha Zamin (1953) as a cruel landowner, Devdas (1955) as Devdas's father, Mughal E Azam (1960) as Raja Maan Singh and the Hollywood film Tarzan Goes to India (1962) as a maharajah. Throughout his career, he was frequently cast as a emperor, judge or police commissioner in over 200 films. He retired from acting in 1987 and several of his delayed films released until the early 1990s.

== Death ==
Murad died in Mumbai on 24 April 1997, at the age of 86.

His son, Raza Murad, also an actor, shared in an interview in 1996 that his father had had an attack of paralysis in 1981. He partially recovered from it but had a hard time walking after that attack. Murad then fully retired from his acting career in 1987. Some of his films later had delayed releases until 1990.

== Selected filmography ==
- Najma (1943) (his debut film in veteran film director Mehboob Khan's film)
- Anmol Ghadi (1946)
- Neecha Nagar (1946) as Hakim Yaqub Khan Sahab
- Anokhi Ada (1948)
- Andaz (1949)
- Shair (1949)
- Dastan (1950)
- Deedar (1951)
- Aan (1952)
- Do Bigha Zamin (1953)
- Mirza Ghalib (1954)
- Amar (1954)
- Devdas (1955)
- Azaad (1955)
- Kundan (1955)
- Yahudi (1958)
- Mughal-e-Azam (1960)
- Tarzan Goes to India (1962)
- Taj Mahal (1963)
- Fauladi Mukka (1965)
- Love in Tokyo (1966)
- Dil Diya Dard Liya (1966)
- Neel Kamal (1968)
- Nadir Shah (1968)
- Jeevan Mrityu (1970)
- Caravan (1971)
- Be-Imaan (1972)
- Yaadon Ki Baaraat (1973)
- Saudagar (1973)
- Imtihan (1974)
- Manoranjan (1974)
- Majboor (1974)
- 5 Rifles (1974)
- Aap Ki Kasam (1974) as Kamal's employer
- Faraar (1975)
- Sanyasi (1975)
- Aadalat(1976)
- Hum Kisi Se Kum Nahin (1977)
- Mukti (1977) as Kapoor
- Chakravyuha (1978 film)
- Ganga Ki Saugandh (1978)
- Nalayak (1978)
- Jaani Dushman (1979)
- Khanjar (1980)
- Thodisi Bewafaii (1980)
- Kaalia (1981)
- Sannata (1981) as Judge
- Andar Baahar (1984)
- Dilwaala (1986)
- Adhikar (1986 film)
- Tamacha (1988)
- Shahenshah (1988) as Judge Jaiswal
- Falak (1988 film)
- Anjaane Rishte (1989)
- Bhrashtachar (1989)
- Pyar Ke Naam Qurbaan (1990)
