= Rajdhani (film) =

- Directed by: Naresh Saigal
- Starring: Sunil Dutt; Nimmi; Durga Khote
- Music by: Hansraj Behl
- Distributed by: N. C. Films
- Release date: 1956
- Country: India
- Language: Hindi

Rajdhani is a 1956 Indian action film directed by Naresh Saigal. Talat Mahmood and Lata Mangeshkar were playback singers for the film.

== Cast ==
- Sunil Dutt
- Nimmi
- Durga Khote
- Johnny Walker
- Ramayan Tiwari
- Purnima
- Kumari Naaz

== Music ==
1. "Bhul Ja Sapne Suhane Bhul Ja" – Talat Mahmood, Lata Mangeshkar
2. "Pehli Mulakat Me Diwana Dil" – Lata Mangeshkar
3. "Chhut Jaaen, Chhut Gayaa" – Lata Mangeshkar
4. "De De Mora Kangna Tu" – Lata Mangeshkar
5. "Din Khushiyo Ke Loot Gaye" – Lata Mangeshkar
6. "Haathon Men, Aa Jaa" – Lata Mangeshkar
7. "Mai To Chanda Se Gori" – Lata Mangeshkar
