= List of Hindi films of 1955 =

This is a list of films produced by the Bollywood film industry based in Mumbai in 1955:

== Highest-grossing films ==
The ten highest-grossing films at the Indian box office in 1955 were:

Rank	Title	Gross collection
1	Shree 420	₹3.90 crore
2	Azaad	₹2.90 crore
3	Jhanak Jhanak Payal Baje	₹2.45 crore
4	Uran Khatola	₹2.15 crore
5	Mr. & Mrs. '55	₹1.75 crore
6	Insaniyat	₹1.45 crore
7	Munimji	₹1.25 crore
8	Seema	₹1.15 crore
9	Baradari	₹1.08 crore
10	Devdas	₹1 crore

== A-C ==
Title	Director	Cast	Genre	Notes
Aaj Ki Baat	Leela Chitnis	Ajit, Chitra, Bipin Gupta, Manmohan Krishan, Sunder, Leela Chitnis	Social	Music: Snehal Bhatkar Lyrics: Hasrat Jaipuri, Raj Baldev Raj, Kaif Irfani
Abe-Hayat	Ramanlal Desai	Premnath, Shashikala, Ameeta, Pran, Mubarak, Kanu Roy, Chaman Puri, S L Puri, P Kailash, Helen, Smriti Biswas	Costume Drama	Music: Sardar Malik Lyrics: Hasrat Jaipuri
Adl-e-Jehangir	G. P. Sippy	Pradeep Kumar, Meena Kumari, Daljeet, Chitra, Sapru, Durga Khote, Kammo, Amir Bano, Darpan, Maruti	Costume Fantasy	Music: Husnlal Bhagatram Lyrics: Qamar Jalalabadi
Adivasiyon Ka Jeevan Srot	Ritwik Ghatak		Documentary	
Albeli	Devendra Goel	Geeta Bali, Pradeep Kumar, Johnny Walker, Om Prakash, Randhir, Tun Tun,	Social Drama	Music: Ravi Lyrics: Ravi
Alladin Ka Beta	Rafiq Rizvi	Mahipal, Chitra, Yashodara Katju, Tiwari, Yogesh Bhalla, Naaz, Maruti	Fantasy	Music: S. Mohinder Lyrics: Tanveer Naqvi
Amanat	Aravind Sen	Bharat Bhushan, Chand Usmani, Pran, Nazir Hussain	Social Drama	Produced by Bimal Roy. Music: Salil Chowdhary Lyrics: Shailendra
Amar Saigal	Nitin Bose	Pahari Sanyal, Tandon, G Mungeri, Akhtar Jahan, Padma Devi	Saigal Documentary	Music: Rai Chand Boral, Pankaj Mullick, Timir Baran, Apresh Lahiri. Singer: Main K. L. Saigal, songs used with scenes from his films.
Andher Nagari Chaupat Raja	Shamim Bhagat	Chitra, Amarnath, B. M. Vyas, Tun Tun, Gope, David	Costume	Music: Avinash Vyas Lyrics: Bharat Vyas
Azaad	S. M. S. Naidu	Dilip Kumar, Meena Kumari, Pran, Achala Sachdev, Om Prakash, Badri Prasad, Randhir, Murad, Shammi	Action Drama	Music: C. Ramachandra Lyrics: Rajendra Krishan
Baap Re Baap	A. R. Kardar	Kishore Kumar, Chand Usmani, Smriti Biswas, Nazneen, Leela Mishra, Jayant, Ulhas	Comedy Drama	Music: O. P. Nayyar Lyrics: Jan Nisar Akhtar
Baghdad Ka Chor	Shriram Bohra	Daljeet, Chitra, Krishna Kumari, Yashodara Katju, Ram Kumar, Maruti	Fantasy	Music: B. N. Bali Lyrics: Omar Khayyam Saharanpuri, Sartaj Rahmani, Khalish Lakhnavi, Harish Rana
Bahu	Shakti Samanta	Karan Dewan, Usha Kiran, Pran, Johnny Walker, Shashikala, Mehmood, Tun Tun, Bipin Gupta	Social Family Drama	Music: Hemant Kumar Lyrics: S. H. Bihari
Bandish	Satyen Bose	Ashok Kumar, Meena Kumari, Daisy Irani, Nazir Hussain, Bhagwan, Shammi, Pratima Devi, Bipin Gupta, Mehmood, Indira Bansal	Family Comedy Drama	Music: Hemant Kumar Lyrics: Jan Nissar Akhtar, Prem Dhawan, Ravi, S. H. Bihari
Bara-Dari	K. Amarnath	Geeta Bali, Ajit, Pran, Chandrashekhar, Tiwari, Gope, Murad, Cuckoo, Minu Mumtaz, Sapru	Social	Music: Shaukat Dehlvi Nashad Lyrics: Khumar Barabankvi
Bhagwat Mahima	V. Panchotia	Nirupa Roy, Prem Adib, Kishore Kumar, Ashok Kumar, Nimmi, Shyama, Krishna Kumari, Sunder, Madan Puri, Om Prakash, David, S. N. Tripathi	Devotional	Music: Hemant Kumar Lyrics: S. H. Bihari, Saraswati Kumar Deepak, Pandit Madhur
Bihar Ke Darshaniya Sthan	Ritwik Ghatak		Documentary	
Bindiya	Shamim Bhagat	Shekhar, Kumkum, Sulochana, Leela Mishra, Mukri, Tun Tun, Shakuntala	Social Family Drama	Music: Snehal Bhatkar Lyrics: Bharat Vyas
Carnival Queen	Noshir Engineer	Fearless Nadia, John Cawas, Sardar Mansur, Habib, Shanti Modak,	Action	Music: Shafi M. Nagri Lyrics: Preetam Dehlvi
Char Paise	N. K. Ziri	Kishore Kumar, Shyama, Nimmi, Jayant, Johnny Walker, Nishi, Agha, Anwar Hussain, Mukri, Roop Mala	Social Comedy	Music: B. D. Burman Lyrics: Sartaj Rahmani
Chhora Chhori	Kidar Sharma	Geet Bali, Johnny Walker, Agha, Tony Walker, Nazira, Pesi Patel, Pratima Devi, Nand Kishore, Rashid Khan	Social	Music: Roshan Lyrics: Kedar Sharma
Chingari	S. Srivastava	Shekhar, Nalini Jaywant, Pran, Leela Mishra, Sunalini Devi	Social	Music: Manohar Lyrics: Sahir Ludhianvi, Shailendra, Anjum
Chirag-e-Cheen	C. M. Trivedi, G. P. Pawar	Mahipal, Sumitra Devi, Vijaylaxmi, Sapru, Krishna Kumari, Bipin Gupta	Fantasy	Music: S. N. Tripathi Lyrics: Raja Mehdi Ali Khan

== D-J ==
Title	Director	Cast	Genre	Notes
Daku	Aspi Irani	Shammi Kapoor, Shashikala, Kuldip Kaur, Prem Adib, Anwar Hussain, W. M. Khan, Babu Raje, Azurie, Sheikh	Costume Action Drama	Music: Snehal Bhatkar Lyrics: Kaif Irfani, Manohar Khanna
Darbar	Nanubhai Vakil	Mahipal, Chitra, Tiwari, Sunder, Niranjan Sharma, Sunder	Costume	Music: Hansraj Behl Lyrics: Asad Bhopali
Deewar	S. Khalil, Ameen	Karan Dewan, Munnawar Sultana Sheikh Mukhtar, Murad, Bhagwan, Shammi, Sudhir, Sultan	Social	Music: Mohammed Shaikh
Devdas	Bimal Roy	Dilip Kumar, Suchitra Sen, Vyjayanthimala, Motilal, Murad, Pran	Tragedy Drama Romance	Music: Sachin Dev Burman Lyrics: Sahir Ludhianvi
Do Dulhe	K J Mahadevan	Shyama, Sajjan, Agha, David, Lalita Pawar, Kanhaiyalal, Achala Sachdev, Vanaja, Ishwarlal	Social	Music: B. S. Kalla Lyrics: Pandit Indra
Duniya Gol Hai	Om Prakash	Karan Dewan, Anita Guha, P. Jairaj, Kuldip Kaur, Shashikala, Madan Puri, Om Prakash, Indu Paul, Sunder	Social	Music: C. Ramchandra Lyrics: Rajendra Krishan
Ekadashi	Gunjal	Trilok Kapoor, Mala Sinha, Sulochana, Jeevan, Gopi, Ratan Kumar, Badri Prasad, Amar	Devotional	Music: Avinash Vyas Lyrics: B. C. Madhur
Faraar a.k.a. Dev Anand in Goa	Phani Mazumdar	Dev Anand, Geeta Bali, Mehmood, Manmohan Krishan, Randhir, Krishna Kant	Crime Social Drama	Music: Anil Biswas Lyrics: Prem Dhawan
Ganga Maiyya	Chandrakant	Prem Adib, Sumitra, Trilok Kapoor, Asha Mathur, Jeevan, Sapru, S. N, Tripathi, Bipin Gupta, Moni Chatterjee, Shakuntala Paranjpye	Devotional	Music: Shankar Rao Vyas Lyrics: Ramesh Chandra Pandey
Garam Coat		Balraj Sahni, Nirupa Roy, Jayant, Brahm Bhardwaj, Rashid Khan, Vijayalaxmi	Social Drama	Music: Amar Nath Lyrics: Majrooh Sultanpuri
Ghamand	Dharam Kumar	Shyama, Sheila Ramani, Kamal Mehra, Murad, Raj Kumar, Seeta Bose	Social Drama	Music: Gulshan Sufi Lyrics: Naqsh Lyallpuri
Ghar Ghar Mein Diwali	Gajanan Jagirdar	Shyama, Sajjan, Gajanan Jagirdar, Manorama, Eruch Tarapore	Social	Produced by Sohrab Modi. Music: Roshan Lyrics: Indeevar, Prem Dhawan
Ha Ha Hee Hee Ho Ho	P. L. Santoshi	Shyama, Sajjan, Radhakrishnan, Raja Gosavi, Ranjana, Ruby Myers	Comedy	Music: Vinod Lyrics: Pyarelal Santoshi
Haseena	J. P. Advani	Shyama, Amarnath, P. Jairaj, Durga Khote, Krishna Kumari, Manmohan Krishan, Kumkum	Costume Drama	Music: Bulo C. Rani Lyrics: Jan Nisar Akhtar
Hatimtai Ki Beti	Nanubhai Vakil	Mahipal, Chitra, Krishna Kumari, Kumkum, Helen, Maruti, Naaz, Hiralal	Fantasy	Music: A. R. Qureshi Lyrics: Shewan Rizvi, Kaifi Azmi
Hoor-E-Arab	P. N. Arora	Pradeep Kumar, Chitra, Sajjan, Shashikala, Om Prakash, Helen, Gope, Shammi	Fantasy	Music: Ghulam Mohammad Lyrics: Shakeel Badayuni
House No. 44	M. K. Burman	Dev Anand, Kalpana Kartik, K. N. Singh, Prabhu Dayal, Kumkum, Bhagwan, Kammo, Rashid Khan, Sheela Vaz	Thriller Romance	Music: S. D. Burman Lyrics: Sahir Ludhianvi|
Inam	M. I. Dharamsey	Suraiya, Nasir Khan, Yakub, Pratima Devi, Mukri, Bimla Kumari	Social	Music: S. N. Tripathi, Saraswati Devi
Insaniyat	S.S Vasan	Dilip Kumar, Dev Anand, Bina Rai, Jayant, P. Jairaj, Shobhna Samarth, Agha, Badri Prasad	Costume Social Drama	Music: C. Ramachandra Lyrics: Rajendra Krishan
Jagadguru Shankaracharya	Sheikh Fattelal	Abhi Bhattacharya, Krishna Kumari, Durga Khote, Sulochana Chatterjee, Helen, Sapru, Kanchanmala, Nanda	Biography Portrait	Music: Avinash Vyas Lyrics: Bharat Vyas
Jalti Nishani	Tara Harish	Geeta Bali, Kamal Kapoor, Kuldip Kaur, Ulhas, Sunder, Chaman Puri, Nazir Kashmiri	Social	Music: Anil Biswas Lyrics: Qamar Jalalabadi
Jalwa	Roop K. Shorey	Meena Shorey, Karan Dewan, Begum Para, Amarnath and Ratan	Social	Music: Vinod Lyrics: Raja Mehdi Ali Khan, Kaif Irfani, Verma Malik, Aziz Kashmiri, Saraswati Kumar Deepak
Jashan	S. Shamsuddin	Vyjayanthimala, Karan Dewan, Kuldip Kaur, Pran, Agha, Johnny Walker, Murad, Randhir	Social Drama	Music: Roshan Lyrics: Rajendra Krishan
Jasoos	R. D. Rajput	Kumkum, Kamran, Neeru, Nazir Kashmiri, Habib	Action	Music: Iqbal Lyrics: Faruk Kaiser, Khawar Zaman, Aziz Jamali, Bahaar Ajmeri
Jawab	Ismail Memon	Geeta Bali, Balraj Sahni, Nasir Khan, Johnny Walker, Mukri, Achala Sachdev, Tun Tun, Ashraf Khan	Social Drama	Music: Nashad Lyrics: Khumar Barabankvi
Jhanak Jhanak Payal Baaje	V. Shantaram	Sandhya, Gopi Krishna, Bhagwan, Keshavrao Date, Madan Puri, Manorama, Nana Palsikar	Musical Drama	Filmfare Awards for Best Movie, Direction (V. Shantaram), Best Art Direction (Kanu Desai), and Sound Design (A. K. Parmar). National Film Award for Best Feature Film. Music: Vasant Desai Lyrics: Hasrat Jaipuri, Saraswati Kumar Deepak, Deewan Sharar, Meera Bai
Joru Ka Bhai	Chetan Anand	Balraj Sahni, Sheila Ramani, Johnny Walker, Kumkum, Parveen Paul, Vijay Anand, Rashid Khan	Social Drama	Music: Jaidev Lyrics: Vishwamitra Adil, Sahir Ludhianvi
Jungle Ka Jadoo	Nari Ghadiali	John Cawas, Leela Gupta, Ashima Bannerjee, Manorama, Habib, Shanta Patel	Fantasy Action	Music: A. K. Prem Lyrics: Preetam Dehlvi, Ratanlal Khanjar, Sheikh Adam

== K-Q ==
Title	Director	Cast	Genre	Notes
Kanchan	Brij Sharma	P. Jairaj, Suraiya, Ranjana, Ajit Raj Mehra, Sapru	Social Drama	Music: Husnlal Bhagatram Lyrics: Rajendra Krishan
Khandaan	M. L. Anand	Shyama, Anwar Hussain, Lalita Pawar, Maruti, Badri Prasad, Murad, Manmohan Krishna, Sunder	Family Drama	Music: A. R. Qureshi Lyrics: Ravi
Kundan	Sohrab Modi	Sohrab Modi, Sunil Dutt, Nimmi, Kumkum, Pran, Murad, Om Prakash, Manorama, Roopmala	Social Drama	Music: Ghulam Mohammad Lyrics: Shakeel Badayuni
Lagan	O. P. Dutta	Nalini Jaywant, Sajjan, Om Prakash, Raj Mehra, Shammi, Randhir, Baby Naaz, David, Ram Avtar, Parshuram	Social	Music: Hemant Kumar Lyrics: Rajendra Krishan
Lakhon Mein Ek	Hira Singh	P. Jairaj, Asha Mathur, Smriti Biswas, Madan Puri, David, Raj Kumar	Comedy	Music: Bhola Shreshtha Lyrics: Hira Singh
Lutera	Ravindra Dave	Nasir Khan, Jabeen, Begum Para, Om Prakash, Nazir Hussain, Noor	Costume Action	Music: C. Ramchandra Lyrics: Rajendra Krishan, Jan Nisar Akhtar
Madhbhare Nain	Hem Chander	Bina Rai, Kishore Kumar, David, Nazir Hussain, Achala Sachdev, Yashodra Katju, Durga Khote, Badri Prasad, Misra	Social	Music:S. D. Burman Lyrics: Shailendra
Mahasati Savitri	Ramnik Vaidya	Nirupa Roy, Mahipal, Anjali Devi, B. M. Vyas, Amirbai Karnataki, S. N. Tripathi	Mythology	Music: Chitragupta Lyrics: Gopal Singh Nepali
Marine Drive	G. P. Sippy	Ajit, Bina Rai, Yakub, K. N. Singh, Vijayalaxmi, Johnny Walker, Hari Shivdasani, Tun Tun, Om Prakash, Anwar Hussain, Jankidas		Music: N. Dutta Lyrics: Sahir Ludhianvi
Mast Qalandar	Kidar Kapoor	Mahipal, Shakila, Kuldip Kaur, Tiwari, Johnny Walker, Maruti	Costume	Music: Hansraj Behl Lyrics: Asad Bhopali, Naqsh Lyallpuri
Mastani	Dhirubhai Desai	Nigar Sultana, Manhar Desai, Shahu Modak, Jankidas, Agha, Ratnamala	Costume	Music: B. N. Bali Lyrics: Raja Mehdi Ali Khan, Omar Khayyam Saharanpuri, B. D. Mishra
Milap	Raj Khosla	Dev Anand, Geeta Bali, K. N. Singh, Johnny Walker, Kumkum	Social	Music: N. Dutta Lyrics: Sahir Ludhianvi
Miss Coca Cola	Kedar Kapoor	Geeta Bali, Shammi Kapoor, Kuldip Kaur, Om Prakash, Johnny Walker, Kamal Kapoor, Helen, Lalita Pawar, Bhudo Advani, Master Romi	Social	Music: O. P. Nayyar Lyrics: Majrooh Sultanpuri
Mr. & Mrs. '55	Guru Dutt	Guru Dutt, Madhubala, Johnny Walker, Lalita Pawar, Yasmin (Vinita Bhatt), Kumkum, Cuckoo, Agha, Jagdeep	Romantic Comedy	O. P. Nayyar Lyrics: Majrooh Sultanpuri
Munimji	Subodh Mukherjee	Dev Anand, Nalini Jaywant, Pran, Prabhu Dayal, Ameeta, Nirupa Roy, Nazir Hussain	Thriller Romance	Music: S. D. Burman Lyrics: Sahir Ludhianvi, Shailendra
Musafirkhana (film)	M. Sadiq	Karan Dewan, Shyama, Johnny Walker, Jayant, Kumkum, Gope, Om Prakash, Shammi	Social	Music: O. P. Nayyar Lyrics: Majrooh Sultanpuri
Naata	D. N. Madhok	Madhubala, Chanchal, Abhi Bhattacharya, Gope, Kanhaiyalal, Vijaylaxmi, Hiralal	Social	Produced by Madhubala. Music: S. Mohinder Lyrics: Tanveer Naqvi, Kaif Irfani
Naqab	Lekhraj Bhakri	Madhubala, Shammi Kapoor, Ajit, Hiralal, Yashodara Katju, Maruti, Asha Mathur	Costume	Music: Gobindram Lyrics: Prem Dhawan
Navratri	Raman B. Desai	Nirupa Roy, Manhar Desai, Kumkum, Lalita Pawar, Sapru, S. N. Tripathi, Niranjan Sharma	Mythology	Music: Chitragupta Lyrics: Gopal Singh Nepali, Bharat Vyas
Oonchi Haveli	Dhirubhai Desai	Nirupa Roy, Karan Dewan, Lalita Pawar, Bhagwan, Yashodara Katju, B. M. Vyas, Jankidas, Niranjan Sharma, Kanchanmala	Social Drama	Music: Shivram Lyrics: Bharat Vyas
Oot Patang	Chandulal J. Shah	Usha Kiran, Agha, Anwar Hussain, Jankidas, Maruti, Vijaylaxmi, Rashid Khan, Mumtaz Begum	Social	Music: Vinod Lyrics: D. N. Madhok
Patit Pawan	Vasant Painter	Sapru, Sulochana Chatterjee, Ulhas, Jeevan, Lalita Pawar, Bipin Gupta, Tun Tun, Baby Naaz	Devotional	Music: Jamal Sen Lyrics: Bharat Vyas
Pehli Jhalak	M. V. Raman	Kishore Kumar, Vyjayanthimala, Begum Para, Jawahar Kaul, Shammi, Tun Tun, Asha Parekh, Om Prakash, Dara Singh, Randhawa, Randhir	Social	Music: C. Ramachandra Lyrics: Rajendra Krishan
Postmaster				Unreleased. Music: Ram Ganguly Lyrics: Verma Malik
Pyaara Dushman	Bhagwan	P. Jairaj, Nadira, Sulochana, Bhagwan, Kumkum, Leela Gupte, Baburao Pendharkar, Vasantrao Pahelwan		Music: Nisar Bazmi Lyrics: Saba Afghani

== R-Z ==
Title	Director	Cast	Genre	Notes
Raftar	Nakshab	Talat Mahmood, Nadira, Baby Naaz, Meenaxi, Chand Burque, Lotan,	Social	Music: Pandit Shivram Lyrics: Nakshab
Railway Platform	Ramesh Saigal	Sunil Dutt, Nalini Jaywant, Sheila Ramani, Johnny Walker, Raj Mehra, Jagdeep, Nana Palsikar, Manmohan	Social Drama	Music: Madan Mohan Lyrics: Sahir Ludhianvi
Raj Durbar	Balwant Bhatt	Nirupa Roy, Ranjan, Asha Mathur, B. M. Vyas, Ishwarlal	Costume	Music: Chitragupta Lyrics: Gopal Singh Nepali, Shyam
Rajkanya		Nalini Jaywant		
Rajkumari	T. R. Raghunath	Padmini, T. R. Rajakumari	Costume	Music: Ajit Merchant Lyrics: Saraswati Kumar Deepak,
Ratna Manjari	G. P. Pawar	Mahipal, Shakila, Rehana, Sapru, Maruti, Moni Chatterjee, Roopmala	Costume	Music: S. N. Tripathi Lyrics: B. D. Mishra
Ratnaghar	Yashwant Pethkar	Raja Paranjpe, Shakuntala Paranjpe, Lalita Pawar, Suryakant	Social	Music: Sudhir Phadke Lyrics: Narendra Sharma
Riyasat	Jaswant Jhaveri	Mahipal, Mala Sinha, Hiralal, Sunder, Raj Kumar, Narmada Shanker	Costume	Music: Avinash Vyas Lyrics: Prem Dhawan
Rukhsana	R. C. Talwar	Meena Kumari, Kishore Kumar, Madan Puri, Shammi, Kumkum, Amar, Sunder	Costume Drama	Music: Shankar Jaikishan Lyrics: Hasrat Jaipuri
Sabse Bada Rupaiya	P. L. Santoshi	Sunder, Shashikala, Agha, Alhad, and Achla Sachdev, Nana Palsikar, Krishnakant	Social	Music: O. P. Nayyar, Naushad Lyrics: Majrooh Sultanpuri
Sakhi Lutera	Mohammed Hussain	Kamran, Shashikala, Kamal Mehra, Habib, Nazir Kashmiri, Kammo	Costume Action	Music: Iqbal Lyrics: Faruk Kaiser
Sardar	Gyan Mukherjee	Ashok Kumar, Bina Rai, Nigar Sultana, Tiwari, Iftekhar, Mehmood, Samson, Jagdish Sethi, Sheela Vaz	Social Crime	Music: Jagmohan Sursagar Lyrics: Uddhav Kumar, Kaif Irfani
Sati Madalasa	Jayant Desai	Nirupa Roy, Manhar Desai, Kumkum, Jeevan, Niranjan Sharma	Devotional	Music: Chitragupta Lyrics: Gopal Singh Nepali
Sau Ka Note	Yashwant Pethkar	Karan Dewan, Geeta Bali, Begum Para, Krishna Kumari, Smriti Biswas, Chand Usmani, Leela Mishra, Badri Prasad	Social	Music: S. Mohinder Lyrics: Anjaan, Majrooh Sultanpuri, Surjit Sethi, Jeet
Seema	Amiya Chakravarty	Balraj Sahani, Nutan, Shobha Khote, Jagdish Raj, Sunder, Pratima Devi	Social Drama	Filmfare Best Actress Award: Nutan. Filmfare Best Story Award: Amiya Chakrabarty. Music: Shankar Jaikishan Lyrics: Hasrat Jaipuri, Shailendra
Shah Behram	Nanubhai Vakil	Mahipal, Asha Mathur, Tiwari, Sunder, Shanti Madhok, Helen, Hiralal, Kammo	Costume Action	Music: Hansraj Behl; Lyrics: Bedam Warsi, Asad Bhopali
Shahi Mehmaan	Balwant Bhatt	Ranjan, Shyama, Ulhas, Shammi, Johnny Walker	Costume	Music: Bipin Babul Lyrics: Anjum Jaipuri, Raja Mehdi Ali Khan, Hasrat Jaipuri
Shahzada	Mohan Sinha	Ajit, Sheila Ramani, Krishna Kumari, Begum Para, Johnny Walker, Achala Sachdev, Habib	Costume Action	Music: Naushad, S. Mohinder Lyrics: Tanveer Naqvi, Khumar Barabankvi
Shikar	Ravindra Dave	Shekhar, Nimmi, Smriti Biswas, Moti Sagar, Bipin Gupta, Bhudo Advani, Bir Sakuja	Double role Drama Social	Music: Bulo C. Rani Lyrics: Indeevar, Noor Devasi, Arshi Ajmeri
Shiv Bhakta	H. L. N. Simha	Shahu Modak, Padmini, Mishra, Pandari Bai, Anant Kumar, Kumari Devi, Sope, Rushendramani, Ramachandra Sastry, Ragini, Deshraj, Raju	Mythological Drama	Music: Chitrgupta Lyrics: Gopal Singh Nepali
Shree 420	Raj Kapoor	Raj Kapoor, Nargis, Nadira, Lalita Pawar, Nemo, Rashid Khan, Iftekhar, Hari Shivdasani, Nana Palsikar, Ali Mirajkar, Tun Tun, Anwaribai, Sheela Vaz	Social Romance	Music: Shankar Jaikishan Lyrics: Hasrat Jaipuri, Shailendra
Shri Krishna Bhakti	Babubhai Mistri Mahipal	Krishna Kumari, Lalita Pawar, Anwar Hussain, Bimon Banerjee, Bipin Gupta, Hiralal	Devotional	Music: Chitragupta Lyrics: Gopal Singh Nepali
Shri Ganesh Vivah	Jaswant Jhaveri	Nirupa Roy, Prem Adib, Durga Khote, Jeevan, B. M. Vyas, Sapru	Religious	Music: Chitragupta Lyrics: Bharat Vyas, Gopal Singh Nepali
Shri Nagad Narayan	I. S. Johar	Motilal, Meena Shorey, Om Prakash, Manju, Badri Prasad, Murad, Leela Mishra	Comedy	Music: Vinod Lyrics: Qamar Jalalabadi, Pyarelal Santoshi, Verma Malik, Madhup Sharma
Sitara	S. K. Ojha	Pradeep Kumar, Vyjayanthimala, Shashikala, Om Prakash, Begum Para, Jayant, Gope, Helen, Ram Avtar, Badri Prasad	Social	Music: Ghulam Mohammed Lyrics: Shakeel Badayuni
Society	Shahid Lateef	Nasir Khan, Nimmi, Johnny Walker, Amar, Iftekhar, Kumkum, Radhika, Minu Mumtaz, Pratima Devi	Social	Music: S. D. Burman Lyrics: Sahir Ludhiyanvi
Son Of Alibaba	Majnu	Mahipal, Chitra, Majnu, Chandrashekhar, Maruti, Nishi	Fantasy Action	Music: Sardul Kwatra Lyrics: Prem Dhawan
Swami Vivekananda	Amar Mullick	Ajit Prakash, Bharati Devi, Anubha Gupta, Manoranjan Bhattacharya	Biography	Music: R. C. Boral, Salil Chowdhary Lyrics: Shankar Sen, Surdas, Tandon Jodhpuri
Tonga-wali	Lekhraj Bhakri	Nirupa Roy, Balraj Sahni, Shammi Kapoor, Anita Guha, Jayant, Gope	Social Family Drama	Music: Salil Chowdhury Lyrics: Prem Dhawan
Teen Bhai	Hemchander Chunder	Nirupa Roy, Bharat Bhushan, Shyama, Nazir Hussain, Pahari Sanyal, Hiralal, Madan Puri, Leela Mishra	Family Drama	Music: Arun Kumar Lyrics: Bharat Vyas
Teerandaz	H. S. Rawail	Madhubala, P. Jairaj, Chandrashekhar, Ajit, Kuldip Kaur, Yashodara Katju, Chanchal, Helen, Gope, Sunder, Kammo	Costume	Music: C. Ramachandra Lyrics: Rajendra Krishan
Tismarkhan a. k. a. Tees Mar Khan	H. S. Kwatra	Shyama, Agha, Jeevan, Sunder, Madan Puri, Roopmala, Sheela Vaz	Action Comedy	Music: Sardul Kwatra Lyrics: Prem Dhawan, Shailendra
Uran Khatola	S. U. Sunny	Dilip Kumar, Nimmi, Surya Kumari, Jeevan, Nawab, Agha, Roop Mala, Amar, Tun Tun, Roopmala	Costume Drama	Music: Naushad Lyrics: Shakeel Badayuni
Vachan	Raj Rishi	Geeta Bali, Balraj Sahni, Rajendra Kumar, Neelima, Radhakrishan, S. K. Prem, Alhad	Family Drama	Music: Ravi Lyrics: Prem Dhawan
Veer Rajputani	JBH Wadia	Manhar Desai, Shakila, Anwar Hussain, B. M. Vyas, S. N. Tripathi, Bipin Gupta, Helen	Legend Drama	Music: Bulo C. Rani Lyrics: Gopal Singh Nepali
Waman Avatar	Raman B. Desai	Nirupa Roy, Trilok Kapoor, Jagdish Kanwal, Bipin Gupta, Sapru, Yashodara Katju, Jankidas, Roopmala, Maya Das	Religious	Music: Avinash Vyas Lyrics: Gopal Singh Nepali, Kavi Pradeep
Yasmin	A. R. Kardar	Vyjayantimala, Suresh, Jayant, Rashid Khan, Shyam Kumar, Rajan Haksar, Habib, Yasmeen Khan, Nawab	Costume Drama	Music: C. Ramachandra Lyrics: Jan Nissar Akhtar
