= 3rd Filmfare Awards =

1956 awards for Hindi cinema

- Date: 1956
- Site: Bombay, India

Highlights
- Best Film: Jagriti
- Best Actor: Dilip Kumar for Azaad
- Best Actress: Kamini Kaushal for Biraj Bahu
- Most awards: Biraj Bahu & Jagriti (2)
- Most nominations: Azaad (4)

The 3rd Filmfare Awards for Hindi cinema were held in 1956.

Azaad led the ceremony with 4 nominations, followed by Biraj Bahu and Jagriti with 3 nominations.

Biraj Bahu and Jagriti won 2 awards each, with the former winning Best Director (for Bimal Roy) and Best Actress (for Kamini Kaushal), and the latter winning Best Film and Best Supporting Actor (for Abhi Bhattacharya), thus becoming the most-awarded films at the ceremony.

== Main awards ==
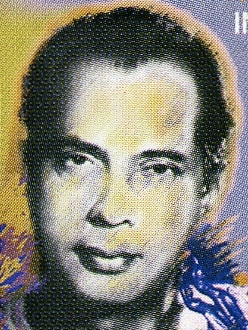
Bimal Roy, Best Director

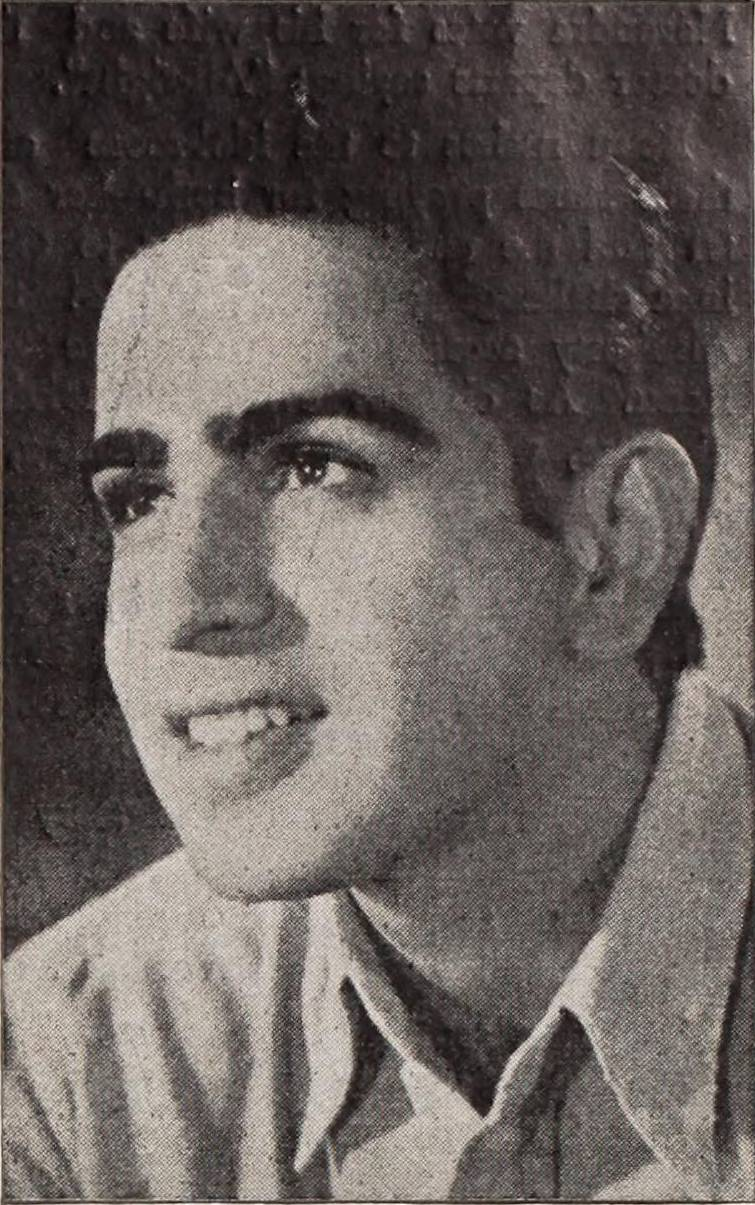
Dilip Kumar, Best Actor

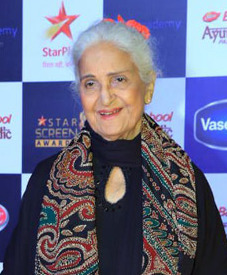
Kamini Kaushal, Best Actress

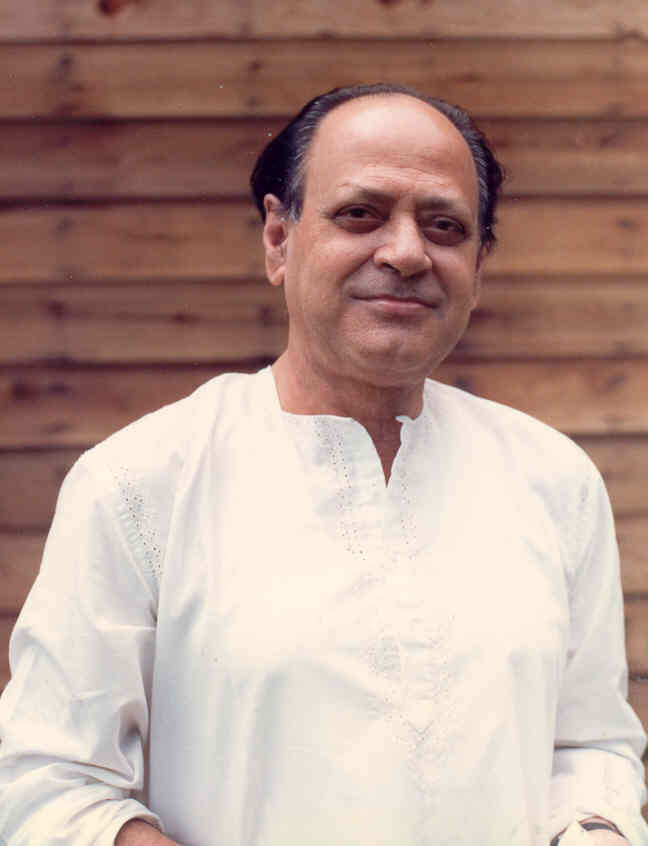
Abhi Bhattacharya, Best Supporting Actor

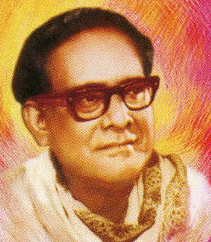
Hemant Kumar, Best Music Director

Best Film	Best Director
Jagriti – Filmistan Productions; Azaad – Pakshiraja Studios; Biraj Bahu – Hiten Chaudhary Productions	Bimal Roy – Biraj Bahu
Best Actor	Best Actress
Dilip Kumar – Azaad as Kumar / Azaad / Abdul Rahim Khan; Bharat Bhushan – Mirza Ghalib as Mirza Ghalib; Dev Anand – Munimji as Amar/Raj	Kamini Kaushal – Biraj Bahu as Biraj Chakravorty; Geeta Bali – Vachan as Kamala; Meena Kumari – Azaad as Shobha
Best Supporting Actor	Best Supporting Actress
Abhi Bhattacharya – Jagriti as Shekhar; Johnny Walker – Railway Platform as Johnny; Ulhas – Kundan as Inspector Sher Singh	Nirupa Roy – Munimji as Malti; Geeta Bali – Kavi as Basanti; Suryakumari – Uran Khatola as Raj Rani
Best Story	Best Music Director
Mukhram Sharma – Vachan; Manoranjan Ghose – Jagriti; Rajinder Singh Bedi – Garam Coat	Hemant Kumar – Nagin; C. Ramchandra – Azaad; Naushad – Uran Khatola

== Technical Awards ==
Best Cinematography	Best Sound Recordist
Dwarka Divecha – Yasmin	R. Kaushik – Amar
Best Art Direction	Best Editor
Rusi Banker – Mirza Ghalib	Hrishikesh Mukherjee – Naukari

== Superlatives ==
The following films had multiple wins and/or multiple nominations

Movie	Awards	Nominations
Biraj Bahu	2	3
Jagriti	2	3
Azaad	1	4
Mirza Ghalib	1	2
Munimji	1	2
Vachan	1	2
Uran Khatola	0	2
