= Faraar (1955 film) =

- Poster
- Directed by: Phani Majumdar
- Screenplay by: Krishan Chander
- Story by: Phani Majumdar
- Produced by: Tara Anand; Pradeep Maitra
- Starring: Dev Anand; Geeta Bali; Johnny Walker; K. N. Singh; Mehmood
- Cinematography: V. Ratra
- Edited by: Kamal Sen
- Music by: Anil Biswas
- Production company: Unique Pictures
- Distributed by: Unique Pictures
- Release date: 3 June 1955
- Country: India
- Language: Hindi

Faraar (transl. Absconding), also known as Dev Anand in Goa, is a 1955 Indian Hindi-language film directed by Phani Majumdar. The film stars Dev Anand and Geeta Bali.

== Plot ==
Set just before the Partition of India, Gora (Dev Anand) is an idealist who leads a group of revolutionaries. They plan to carry out bomb explosions in important places controlled by the British. One of the revolutionaries, Bipin (Anand Pal), betrays them. Bipin is shot and injured in a court trial by Gora, who along with his fellow revolutionaries Ajay (Shrawan Kumar) and Bipin's wife Anjali (Poonam), flee to Goa by sea. While the trio are on the run, Gora suffers a bullet injury and recuperates in a hospital headed by Dr. Pillay (Manmohan Krishna), a former revolutionary who has settled in Goa. Meenakshi (Poonam again), a nurse who works there, offers to help Gora by masquerading as her wife for his safety. Gora meets a singer-dancer Kitty (Geeta Bali) and falls in love with her, she too reciprocates his feelings and becomes his accomplice. Through an admirer of Kitty, Gora acquires the things he needs to set up a bomb making factory and is determined to make his plan a success. At this time however, Bipin arrives in Goa accompanied by a police officer (Krishan Dhawan) and mounts an operation against the revolutionaries, even succeeding in destroying the ship that carried boxes of ammunition, killing Anjali. Gora has no choice but to escape and foils the plans made by the police with Kitty's help. The film ends with both escaping to Bombay safely.

== Cast ==
Adapted from The Hindu.

- Dev Anand as Gora
- Geeta Bali as Kitty
- Manmohan Krishna as Dr. Pillay
- Gautam Mukherjee as Bipin
- Krishan Dhawan as the police officer
- Poonam as Anjali/Meenakshi
- Shrawan Kumar as Ajay
- Mehmood (Guest Appearance)

== Production ==
Faraar was the last film where Dev Anand worked with Geeta Bali, even though Pocket Maar was released a year later. It was also the last Dev Anand film where principal photography took place in Goa. The choreography was done by Sachin Shankar and Zohra Sehgal.

== Soundtrack ==
Faraar (1955 film)

Soundtrack album by Anil Biswas
- Released: 1955
- Label: HMV
- Producer: Anil Biswas

The music was composed by Anil Biswas while Ali Sardar Jafri and Kaifi Azmi wrote the lyrics for the songs "Aaya Aaya Bambai Wala" and "Pyar Ki Dastaan Tum Suno To Hum Kahe" respectively, Prem Dhawan wrote the lyrics for the rest. On the album, film critic Suresh Kohli of The Hindu called Geeta Dutt's rendition of all the songs she sang as "sonorous".

All music is composed by Anil Biswas.

No.	Title	Singer(s)	Length
1.	"Jee Bharke Pyar Karlo"	Geeta Dutt	4:06
2.	"Har Ek Nazar Idhar Udhar Hai Bekarar Tere Liye"	Geeta Dutt	3:04
3.	"Dil Chura Loon"	Geeta Dutt	2:47
4.	"Pyar Ki Dastaan Tum Suno To Hum Kahe"	Lata Mangeshkar, Hemanta Mukherjee	3:00
5.	"Ek Raat Ki Yeh Preet"	Geeta Dutt	5:33
6.	"Aaya Aaya Bambai Wala"	Anil Biswas	2:31

== Reception ==
Kohli appreciated the on-screen chemistry between Anand and Bali.
