= Do Mastane =

- Directed by: Harish Tara
- Starring: Geeta Bali; Motilal; Johny Walker
- Music by: Hemant Kumar; Mohammed Shafi
- Release date: 1958
- Country: India
- Language: Hindi

Do Mastane is a 1958 Hindi film directed by Harish Tara. It stars Geeta Bali, Motilal, Nigar Sultana, Begum Para, Sheikh Mukhtar, Johnny Walker, N. A. Ansari, Murad, Tun Tun and Sapru. It has music by Hemant Kumar and lyrics written by S.H. Bihari, Indeevar, Kaif Irfani, Anjum Jaipuri and Balkrishna Sharma Madhup.

== Cast ==
- Geeta Bali
- Motilal
- Nigar Sultana
- Begum Para
- Sheikh Mukhtar
- Johnny Walker
- N. A. Ansari
- Murad
- Tun Tun
- Sapru

== Soundtrack ==
#	Song	Singer
1	"Aa Nainon Mein Jhoom Kar Sajna"	Lata Mangeshkar
2	"Haye Re O Janewali"	Hemant Kumar
3	"Kabhi Akadkar Baat Na Karna"	Geeta Dutt, Hemant Kumar
4	"Goolon Ka Khilaoon"	Asha Bhosle
5	"Dil Se Mila Dil"	Lata Mangeshkar, Hemant Kumar
6	"Mohabbat Ke Janaaze Par"	Lata Mangeshkar
7	"Nazron Se Chhup Kar"	Lata Mangeshkar, Hemant Kumar
8	"Hum Pyaar Mein Jitne Kadam Chale"	Lata Mangeshkar
9	"Bandhan Hain Haathon Ke"	Lata Mangeshkar
10	"Do Bol Tere Meethe Meethe"	Lata Mangeshkar, Hemant Kumar
11	"Qaraar Jisko Na Aaye"	Lata Mangeshkar
