= Manassakshi =

- Directed by: S. K. A. Chari
- Written by: Kannadasan
- Produced by: A. L. Srinivasan
- Starring: Rajkumar; Bharathi; Narasimharaju; M. P. Shankar
- Cinematography: V. Selvaraj
- Edited by: V. P. Krishnan; Shanmugam
- Music by: G. K. Venkatesh
- Production company: ALS Productions
- Distributed by: ALS Productions
- Release date: 19 February 1968
- Running time: 140 minutes
- Country: India
- Language: Kannada

Manassakshi is a 1968 Indian Kannada-language film, directed by S. K. A. Chari and produced by A. L. Srinivasan. The film stars Rajkumar, Bharathi, Narasimharaju and M. P. Shankar. The film has musical score by G. K. Venkatesh. The movie was a remake of the 1956 Hindi movie Pocket Maar which was earlier remade in Tamil in 1961 as Thirudathe and later in Telugu in 1970 as Marina Manishi.

== Cast ==
- Rajkumar as Somanna
- Bharathi Vishnuvardhan as Gowri
- Sowcar Janaki in a cameo
- Narasimharaju as Bhoopathi
- M. P. Shankar
- Shylashri
- Ranga
- Nagappa
- Suryakumar
- H. R. Shastry
- Guggu
- Shivaji
- Govindaraj
- B. V. Radha
- Sadhana
- M. Jayashree
- Shanthamma
- Baby Nagamani

== Soundtrack ==
The music was composed by G. K. Venkatesh.

No.	Song	Singers	Lyrics	Length (m:ss)
1	"Alealeyali Vuliyulididhe"	P. B. Sreenivas	Vijaya Narasimha	03:07
2	"Mai Nimiri Ninthu Mudaveri"	P. Susheela	Vijaya Narasimha	03:46
