= Nishana (1950 film) =

1950 film by Wajahat Mirza

- Directed by: Wajahat Mirza
- Produced by: Makhanlal; M. & T. Films
- Starring: Madhubala; Ashok Kumar; Geeta Bali
- Music by: Khwaja Khurshid Anwar
- Release date: 1950
- Country: India
- Language: Hindi

Nishana (meaning "Target") is a 1950 Indian Hindi-language romantic drama film directed by Wajahat Mirza, and starring Madhubala, Ashok Kumar and Geeta Bali. The film's music was composed by Khurshid Anwar.

Nishana was the first time Madhubala appeared opposite Ashok Kumar after their blockbuster Mahal (1949). The film's box office success cemented her star status. It also further popularised the onscreen pairing of Madhubala and Kumar, who went on to star in Ek Saal (1957), Howrah Bridge (1958) and Chalti Ka Naam Gaadi (1958).

== Plot ==
The film revolves around Mohan (Kumar), a wealthy brat who is raised by his hot tempered, arrogant father (Kanhaiyalal). When his father forces him to get married and settle down, Mohan secretly employs a cheerful dancing girl, Chanda (Bali), to pose as his wife in front of his parents. Chanda however ends ups falling in love with Mohan. In the meantime, he meets Radha (Madhubala), an orphan. They are attracted towards each other and indulge in a sexual intercourse. Drama ensues when Radha becomes pregnant with Mohan's child and his father throws him out of his house for cheating with his "wife". His father dies soon. An ostracized Radha also kills herself after giving birth to her child. In the end, Mohan and Chanda adopt the girl child and name her Radha.

== Cast ==
The film's main cast includes:

- Madhubala as Radha
- Ashok Kumar as Mohan
- Geeta Bali as Chanda
- Kanhaiyalal as Mohan's father
- Durga Khote as Mohan's mother
- Shyama as Radha's friend

== Soundtrack ==
The score and soundtrack was composed by Khwaja Khurshid Anwar and the lyrics were penned by Nakhshab Jarchavi. The songs were sung by Shamshad Begum, Geeta Dutt and Rajkumari.

Song	Singer
Ishq Me Hum Mar Jayenge	Shamshad Begum, Rajkumari
Kaisee Muralee Bajaayee Shaam Ne	Geeta Dutt
Too Too Too Ghar Aaja	Geeta Dutt
Wo Ruth Gaye Dil Tut Gaya	Geeta Dutt
Seene Ki Dhadkan Tej Hui	Geeta Dutt
Katile Tore Naina	Shamshad Begum
Hato Jaao Pare Mat Chedo	Shamshad Begum
Koi Kisi Se Dil Na Lagana	Shamshad Begum
