= Albeli (1955 film) =

- Directed by: Devendra Goel
- Produced by: Devendra Goel
- Starring: Pradeep Kumar; Geeta Bali; Om Prakash; Johnny Walker
- Music by: Ravi
- Production company: Films And Televisions
- Release date: 1955
- Country: India
- Language: Hindi

Albeli is a 1955 Hindi romantic drama film produced and directed by Devendra Goel. The film starred Geeta Bali in the title role of Albeli. It was produced under the Films And Televisions banner. The music director and lyricist was Ravi, who had made his debut as a composer with Goel's film Vachan released the same year as Albeli. Besides Geeta Bali, the film co-starred Pradeep Kumar, Brijranjana Shukla, Om Prakash, Randhir, Johnny Walker and Tun Tun.

The film involves a girl infatuated by a theatre personality and her antics in trying to get his attention, to the extent of staging a false kidnapping, both falling in love midway through the drama. A side story focuses on the love affair and elopement of the heroine's sister.

== Plot ==
Geeta and Rita are sisters of Mr. Verma, the owner of Nan Ching Chung hotel. Rita is in love with Brij and Geeta helps her elope and get married. Geeta is infatuated by Pradeep, a singer and musician. When she finds out he is in town, she makes several attempts to meet him, but fails. Pradeep meets Geeta when she is helping Rita elope and in some scuffle and misunderstanding he thinks Geeta is trying to escape some people that are out to get her. He helps take her to the police station, where she claims to have been abducted by Pradeep himself. Mr. Verma arrives, and fed up with his daughter's antics, he sends them to another town where they enroll in a school to learn music. The music teacher is Pradeep, a fact Geeta knew from before. She again helps her sister to go off on her honeymoon with her husband, while pretending to be Rita to keep up pretenses of her still being at the academy. Her masquerade leads to several funny situations in the film. Eventually, the situation unravels, the father accepts Rita's wedding and Geeta and Pradeep are united.

== Cast ==
- Pradeep Kumar
- Geeta Bali
- Brijranjana Shukla
- Om Prakash
- Randhir
- Johnny Walker
- Tun Tun
- Jankidas
- Rajan Kapoor
- Ramola Devi

== Soundtrack ==
The music was composed by Ravi, who also wrote the lyrics for the film. The playback singing was provided by Asha Bhosle, Lata Mangeshkar and Hemant Kumar.

=== Song list ===
Song	Singer
"Gori Tujhe Aana Padega"	Hemant Kumar
"Hum To Peeke Chale"	Hemant Kumar
"Muskurati Hui Chandni, Jagmagata Hua Aasman"	Hemant Kumar, Lata Mangeshkar
"Ja Re Chanda Ja"	Lata Mangeshkar
"Tum Sang Lagi Balam"	Asha Bhosle
"O Balma Kyun Na Karoon"	Asha Bhosle
"Kabhi Kisise Dil Na Lagana"	Asha Bhosle
