= Jaal (1952 film) =

- Directed by: Guru Dutt
- Screenplay by: Guru Dutt; M. A. Lateef (dialogues)
- Story by: Guru Dutt
- Produced by: T. R. Fatehchand
- Starring: Dev Anand; Geeta Bali
- Cinematography: V. K. Murthy
- Edited by: J. S. Diwadkar
- Music by: S. D. Burman
- Production company: Film Arts
- Distributed by: Film Arts
- Release date: 3 October 1952
- Running time: 165 minutes
- Country: India
- Language: Hindi

Jaal (lit. 'The Trap') is a 1952 Indian Hindi-language crime noir film directed by Guru Dutt. The film stars Dev Anand and Geeta Bali in lead roles. Set in Goa, it follows gold smuggler Tony Fernandes (Anand), wooing a local fisherwoman Maria (Bali) against the backdrop of smuggling.

It was filmed on location in the coastal fishing villages of Goa by V. K. Murthy in black-and-white and marked the beginning of a longtime professional partnership between Dutt and Murthy. Its soundtrack by S. D. Burman, which incorporates Goan folk music, became popular, especially the songs "Yeh Raat Yeh Chandni" sung by Hemant Kumar and "Chandni Raaten" sung by Lata Mangeshkar.

It was one of the first films to be made in India which portrayed a morally ambiguous anti-hero in the lead role and established the idea of heroic characters with "no qualms about bending moral codes" in Hindi cinema, a smuggler who manipulates others without remorse, which served as a departure from the era's conventional romantic leads. Dutt explores the themes of crime, redemption, and love in this social melodrama.

The film was successful at box office and was the third-highest-grossing film of the year in India, behind Aan and Baiju Bawra.

In his autobiography Romancing with Life, Anand said that Jaal was inspired by the 1949 Italian film Bitter Rice.

== Plot ==
Set in a fishing village of 1950s Goa during Portuguese rule in India, the film depicts the ties between Tony, a good-for-nothing man from the city, and Maria, a village fisherwoman who loves him innocently. The spirit of Christian love and forgiveness lies at the base of the story, and the film has a strong religious colour to it.

After losing his vision during a storm, Carlos lives with his sister, Maria, on the Indian coast in a fishing village. One day a mysterious young woman, Lisa, enters their lives claiming to have been abandoned by her husband, followed by a mysterious man, Tony Fernandes. Maria and Tony fall in love with each other, much to the chagrin of Simon, who loves Maria and wants to marry her. Lisa then warns Maria that she has known Tony, they have had an affair together, and he had betrayed her, however, this warning has no effect on Maria. Then a gypsy palm-reader also cautions Maria that she may be headed for disaster at the hands of a stranger.

Tony is actually a gold smuggler plying his trade between Indian ports still under colonial rule, like Goa, he arrived in the village fleeing the police from Bombay and in pursuit of Lisa, his former accomplice who betrayed him out of his share. Tony integrates into the village by bidding at fish auctions to covertly recover smuggled gold and manipulates Maria into aiding his gold smuggling operations, planning to betray her by selling her to Arab traders to settle his debts. The police close in during a climactic chase and Tony abandons Maria at sea in a desperate bid to escape. Maria's unwavering faith and plea for his better nature convince Tony to surrender to authorities as she vows to wait for his return after imprisonment.

== Cast ==
- Dev Anand as Tony Fernandes, a gold smuggler
- Geeta Bali as Maria, a local fisherwoman
- Purnima as Lisa, Tony's former associate and ex-lover
- K. N. Singh as Carlos, Maria's blind brother
- Ram Sing as Simon
- Rasheed
- Krishna Kumari as a gypsy palm-reader
- Johnny Walker as Tony's associate
- Raj Khosla as Commissioner of the Bombay Police
- Guru Dutt as a fisherman

== Soundtrack ==
All the songs were composed by S. D. Burman and the lyrics were penned by Sahir Ludhianvi. Burman was assisted by N. Datta. The Goan folk-infused soundtrack accompanies the film setting of the Goa coast.

The romantic tracks "Yeh Raat Yeh Chandni" and "Chandni Raaten" sung by Hemant Kumar and Lata Mangeshkar have remained popular and are often featured in their compilations. The former visualized Geeta Bali as Maria ensnared in a fishing net (jaal) under moonlight, symbolizing her entrapment by Tony (Dev Anand). Burman's choice of Kumar as a playback singer for Anand faced initial resistance from the production team but he was chosen to evoke a deeper and more introspective tone.

"Jor Laga Ke Haiya" sung by Geeta Dutt, is a folk track set amid a fishing scene and features an uncredited cameo by director Guru Dutt as a fisherman. "Soch Samajhkar Dil Ko Lagana" is a warning track about love visualized on a gypsy palm-reader.

Song	Singer
"De Bhi Chuke Hum Dil Nazrana Dil Ka"	Kishore Kumar, Geeta Dutt
"Hans Le Ga Le, Dhoom Macha Le; Kaisi Yeh Jaagi Agan"	Lata Mangeshkar
"Pighla Hai Sona Door Gagan Par"	Lata Mangeshkar
"Chori Chori Meri Gali Aana Hai Bura"	Lata Mangeshkar
"Chandni Raaten, Pyar Ki Baaten"	Lata Mangeshkar, Hemant Kumar
"Yeh Raat Yeh Chandni Phir Kahan, Sun Ja Dil Ki Dastan"	Hemant Kumar
"Jor Laga Ke Haiya Pair Jama Ke Haiya; Haiya Hai, Haiya Hai"	Geeta Dutt
"Soch Samajhkar Dil Ko Lagana"	Geeta Dutt

== Production ==
Jaal was Guru Dutt's second directorial following the urban crime thriller Baazi (1951) which also starred Dev Anand. Anand and Dutt had viewed together the Italian neorealist film Bitter Rice (1949) directed by Giuseppe De Santis and adapted the story for a rural Indian context.

The film was shot on location in the rural coastal villages of Goa and faced transportation and equipment handling challenges. Cinematographer V. K. Murthy employed techniques such as stark lighting and deep shadows to evoke tension and isolation, frame-within-frame in coastal scenes, crane shots in village and sea scenes and sunset shots in the song "Pighla Hai Sona", with the sound of waves serving as a leitmotif throughout the film. These realist choices would be followed up in Dutt's classic films Pyaasa (1957) and Kaagaz Ke Phool (1959).

One of the shooting locations was Malvan in Sindhudurg district, Anand and Geeta Bali met with an accident on the return journey. Anand, after consuming local feni, was driving Bali and others back to Bombay in his Chevrolet Impala, losing control on the highway he crashed into a tree, which rammed the steering wheel into his chest and almost broke his ribs. They spent some time at the Sassoon Hospital in Pune for recovery.

Raj Khosla and Atma Ram served as assistant directors, while Nariman Irani was the assistant cinematographer and Maganlal Dresswala was one of the costume designers.

== Reception and legacy ==
Initial audience reactions were mixed, with some viewers uncomfortable with the lead character's negative traits, yet the film gained popularity through its romantic elements and memorable songs, contributing to its commercial success as a hit.

Jaal is considered an early Indian noir classic for its characters with shades of grey which were among the first of this type in Indian cinema. Filmfare listed it among the Best Bollywood Noir Films of '50s. As part of Dutt's centenary celebrations in 2025, Jaal featured in retrospectives and festivals such as the Indian Film Festival of Melbourne.

Director Dutt and cinematographer Murthy's visual style has been noted for its innovative techniques and themes, cementing Dutt as one of India's greatest filmmakers.

Jaal has also received praise for its realistic portrayal of the Goan Christian fisherfolk, which went against negative Goan Christian stereotypes of immorality. The film portrays them as hardworking and god-fearing and helped shape the popular representation of Christians in India.

=== Jaal movement ===
The film was licensed for release in East Pakistan. Film distributor Bari Malik illegally released the film in West Pakistan, at Regent Cinema in Lahore. Pakistan at the time maintained strict quotas for foreign films in the two provinces. The release sparked major protests by West Pakistani film workers on 9 July 1954, demanding a ban on Indian films viewing them as a threat against their nascent film industry. Known as the Jaal movement or Jaal agitation, the protests involved such figures as Noor Jehan, Santosh Kumar, Shaukat Hussain Rizvi, W. Z. Ahmed and Sudhir.

The protests forced the Pakistani government to implement a "film-for-film" barter system with India, restricting the number of Indian films released in Pakistan to that of Pakistani films released in India. A complete ban on Indian films was ultimately enforced following the Indo-Pakistani War of 1965.
