= Mai Baap =

- Directed by: M. Sadiq
- Written by: Rafi Ajmeri
- Screenplay by: M. Sadiq
- Story by: M. Sadiq
- Produced by: M. Sadiq
- Starring: Balraj Sahni; Shyama; Johnny Walker
- Cinematography: Minoo Billimoria
- Edited by: Moosa Mansoor
- Music by: O. P. Nayyar
- Production company: Sadiq Productions Ltd.
- Distributed by: Sadiq Productions Ltd.
- Release date: 1957
- Country: India
- Language: Hindi

Mai Baap is a 1957 Bollywood comedy film starring Balraj Sahni, Shyama, Johnny Walker, Minoo Mumtaz in lead roles and the music in the film was composed by O. P. Nayyar.

== Plot ==
Chandan wins a lottery ticket but Parker, ticket seller, plans to capture the winning ticket and make him fool.

== Cast ==
- Balraj Sahni as Chandan
- Shyama as Basanti
- Johnny Walker as Parker
- Minoo Mumtaz as Leela
- Nazir Hussain as Kaka
- Raj Mehra as Banwari
- S N Banerjee as Eye Doctor
- Baby Leela as Radha

== Music ==
Lyrics written by Jan Nisar Akhtar, Qamar Jalalabadi, Anjaan and Kapur.

Song	Singer
"Main Hoon Mr. Johny"	Mohammed Rafi
"Tu Dil Mera Lauta De Angrezi Sahibzade"	Mohammed Rafi, Geeta Dutt
"Dekho Ji Dekho Mithi Ada Se, Jalnewale Jale"	Mohammed Rafi, Geeta Dutt
"Dil To Razamand Hai" – 1	Asha Bhosle
"Dil To Razamand Hai" – 2	Asha Bhosle
"Galon Pe Tere Gori"	Asha Bhosle
