= Mr. India (1961 film) =

Mr. India (1961)
- Directed by: G. P. Sippy
- Written by: I.S. Johar
- Produced by: G.P. Sippy
- Starring: I.S. Johar; Geeta Bali; Helen; Feroz Khan
- Music by: G.S.Kohli
- Production company: Sippy Films
- Release date: 1961
- Country: India
- Language: Hindi

Mr. India is a 1961 romantic musical film directed by G. P. Sippy. The film is about a naive unemployed youth who is mistaken for a look-alike gangster. I.S. Johar stars as Gullu, and Geeta Bali portrays Miss Bembi. This is G.P Sippy's last film as a Director.

== Plot ==
Gulu Lala lives with his middle-class parents in Chinchpokli, Bombay. Believing himself to be Hindustani and speaking Hindi, he is unable to secure employment with Parsi, Sindhi, Marwari, and Tamil businessmen, and spends his time walking a stray dog, Charlie, along Marine Drive. One day, he comes to the rescue of Sindhi-speaking wealthy businessman, Rai Bahadur Himmatchand and his snobbish daughter, Bembi, who initially "borrow" Charlie and then Gullu himself to live in their mansion. Eventually, the couple get attracted to each other - little knowing that soon their lives will be changed drastically when Gullu is mistaken for a look-alike gangster named Jung Bahadur, while a disapproving Himmatchand is all set to get his daughter married to a wealthy man named Kamal Jeet.

== Cast ==
- Geeta Bali as Bembi
- I. S. Johar as Gullu Lala / Jung Bahadur
- Helen as Rita Sahu
- Hari Shivdasani as Rai Bahadur Himmatchand

== Soundtrack ==
The music was scored by G.S.Kohli to lyrics written by Jan Nisar Akhtar and Anjaan (lyricist).

#	Song	Singer	Lyricist
1	"Haay, Teri Aankh Mein Woh Kamal Hai"	Mohammed Rafi	Anjaan (lyricist)
2	"Mat Poochh Mera Hai Kaun"	Mohammed Rafi	Anjaan (lyricist)
3	"Kya Soch Raha Matwale"	Mohammed Rafi	Jan Nisar Akhtar
4	"Kahan Chali Chham Se"	Mohammed Rafi, Asha Bhosle	Jan Nisar Akhtar
5	"Chhodke Na Jaana"	Mohammed Rafi, Asha Bhosle	Jan Nisar Akhtar
6	"Nazar Yeh Teri"	Mohammed Rafi, Asha Bhosle	Jan Nisar Akhtar
7	"Mein Maachis Ki Tili"	Geeta Dutt	Jan Nisar Akhtar
8	"Dekha Na Jaaye"	Geeta Dutt	Jan Nisar Akhtar
