= Amanat (1955 film) =

- Directed by: Aravind Sen
- Produced by: Bimal Roy
- Starring: Bharat Bhushan; Chand Usmani; Pran
- Music by: Salil Chowdhury
- Production company: Bimal Roy Productions
- Release date: 1955
- Country: India
- Language: Hindi

Amanat is a 1955 Bollywood film directed by Arvind Sen and produced by Bimal Roy starring Bharat Bhushan, Chand Usmani, Pran in lead roles.

== Plot ==
A dying man entrusts his life savings to Purshotam, a stranger he just met, and asks him to promise to take this money to his wife, and son Pradeep, in a remote village in India.

== Cast ==
- Bharat Bhushan as Pradeep
- Chand Usmani as Meena
- Pran as Naresh
- Nazir Hussain as Purushottam
- Kanhaiyalal as Laxmidas
- Asit Sen as Ganesh
- Achala Sachdev as Pradeep's Mother

== Music ==
Song	Singer
"Banke Adayen Dekhna Ji"	Geeta Dutt
"Jab Se Mili Tose Ankhiyan, Jiyara Dole Re Dole"	Geeta Dutt, Hemant Kumar
"Chhal Chhal Pani Hamari Zindagani, Yeh Chalke Rukna"	Manna Dey, Asha Bhosle
"Re Murakh, Tu Kya Jane, Tune Sab Kuch Aaj Gavaya"	Manna Dey, Asha Bhosle
"Meri Wafaye, Tumhari Jafaye"	Asha Bhosle
"Jab Tumne Mohabbat Chhinli"	Asha Bhosle
