= Ameer (film) =

- Directed by: Chandu
- Starring: Geeta Bali; Kamal Kapoor
- Music by: Lachchiram Talwar
- Production company: Chandu Films
- Release date: 1954
- Country: India
- Language: Hindi

Ameer is a 1954 Bollywood drama film directed by Chandu starring Geeta Bali and Kamal Kapoor in lead roles.

== Cast ==
- Geeta Bali
- Kamal Kapoor
- Manju
- Babu Raje
- Ramayan Tiwari
- Vasantrao

== Music ==
No.	Title	Singer(s)
1	"Kaha Se Aay Hai"	Asha Bhosle, S Balbir
2	"Pyar Karo Pyar Badi Cheez Hai"	Asha Bhosle
3	"Tumhe Yaad Hoga"	Asha Bhosle
4	"Jo Koi Dil Se Mohabbat Ke"	Mubarak Begum, S. Balbir
5	"Lakh Tare Liye Jaise Soya"	Mubarak Begum
6	"Subah Ki Angadayi Hu"	Asha Bhosle
