= Milap (1955 film) =

- Poster
- Directed by: Raj Khosla
- Screenplay by: Nabendu Ghosh
- Story by: Raj Khosla
- Produced by: T. R. Fatechand
- Starring: Dev Anand; Geeta Bali; Johnny Walker; K. N. Singh; Tun Tun
- Cinematography: V. K. Murthy
- Edited by: S. E. Chandiwale
- Music by: Datta Naik
- Production company: Film Arts
- Distributed by: Film Arts
- Release date: 1955
- Country: India
- Language: Hindi

Milap (lit. 'The Union') is a 1955 Indian Hindi-language comedy drama film directed by Raj Khosla. The film featured Dev Anand and Geeta Bali in the lead roles.

== Plot ==
The whole film.

Rajendra Sayal becomes a millionaire from a poverty-stricken situation with the help of his friend Kalu. Jealous of his sudden elevation in status, a lawyer named Karamchand plots to rob Sayal of all his property. For this reason, he hires Asha to seduce Sayal and make him fall in love with her, but she ends up falling for him. He too reciprocates her feelings, and discovers Karamchand's nefarious schemes. The film ends in a courtroom, where Karamchand stands exposed for his misdeeds. Sayal and Asha happily unite.

== Cast ==
- Dev Anand as Rajendra Sayal
- Geeta Bali as Asha
- Johnny Walker as Kalu
- K. N. Singh as Lawyer Karamchand
- Krishan Dhawan (credited as "Krishin Dhawan") as Mohan Dayal
- Kumkum as courtesan
- Rajendra as Teju
- Tun Tun as Mrs. Akhrodwala
- Indira (actress) as Miss Rosy Akhrodwala
- Kesar bai as Rai Bahadur's step-sister
- Lily Kelkar as Rai bahadur's niece
- Rajan Kapoor as defence attorney
- T.N Charlie as Tailor of Tip Top
- Rirkoo as Insurance agent

== Soundtrack ==
Milap

Soundtrack album by Datta Naik
- Released: 1955
- Length: 23 minutes
- Label: HMV
- Producer: Datta Naik

The music was composed by Datta Naik, while Sahir Ludhianvi wrote the lyrics for the songs. On the album, film critic Vijay Lokapally of The Hindu called Geeta Dutt's rendition of the song "Jaate Ho To Jaao Par Jaaoge Kahaan" as "hummable" while terming the rest as "forgettable".

All lyrics are written by Sahir Ludhianvi; all music is composed by Datta Naik.

No.	Title	Singer(s)	Length
1.	"Ye Baharo Ka Sama"	Lata Mangeshkar	3:17
2.	"Jaate Ho To Jaao Par Jaaoge Kahaan"	Geeta Dutt	2:58
3.	"Bachanaa Zaraa Ye Zamaanaa Hai Buraa"	Geeta Dutt, Mohammed Rafi	3:11
4.	"Piya Khul Ke Na Nain Milaye Re"	Asha Bhosle	3:28
5.	"Chahe Bhi Jo Dil Jana Na Waha"	Geeta Dutt	3:26
6.	"Humse Bhi Kar Lo Kabhi To Kabhi Mithti Mitthi Do Baate"	Geeta Dutt	3:29
7.	"Dard Ka Saaz Bhi Hai Dil Ki Aawaz Bhi Hai"	Lata Mangeshkar	3:28

== Reception ==
Lokapally noted that Anand's "transformation from a naïve character to a sophisticated urban is expectedly breezy." He felt the film "was not the best offering from Raj Khosla".
