= C.I.D. (1956 film) =

1956 film by Raj Khosla

C.I.D
- Poster
- Directed by: Raj Khosla
- Written by: Inder Raj Anand
- Screenplay by: Inder Raj Anand
- Produced by: Guru Dutt
- Starring: Dev Anand; Shakila; Waheeda Rehman
- Cinematography: V. K. Murthy; Anwar
- Edited by: Y. G. Chawan
- Music by: O. P. Nayyar
- Production company: Guru Dutt Movies Pvt. Ltd.
- Distributed by: Guru Dutt Movies Pvt. Ltd.
- Release date: 2 November 1956
- Country: India
- Language: Hindi
- Box office: 2.5 Crore

C.I.D. is a 1956 Indian Hindi-language neo-noir crime thriller film directed by Raj Khosla and produced by Guru Dutt. It stars Dev Anand, Shakila, Johnny Walker, K. N. Singh and Waheeda Rehman. The film has Dev Anand playing a police inspector investigating a murder case. The music was given by O. P. Nayyar and the lyrics by Majrooh Sultanpuri and Jan Nisar Akhtar. It was Waheeda Rehman's screen debut in Hindi films, and future directors Pramod Chakravorty and Bhappi Sonie worked as assistant directors on this film.

== Plot ==
A newspaper editor, Shrivastav, is wounded when he was about to expose the underworld links of a rich and influential man. He calls over his friend, Inspector Shekhar, to talk to him about the threat he receives from the underworld. Srivastav dies by the time Shekhar arrives. He remembers that he saw a suspicious person by the elevator and borrows a woman's car to chase him. The woman throws a fit (and even throws the car keys in the mud when it is raining outside) and they lose the chase. In the morning, the two return home when they find the keys. Meanwhile, on the crime scene, petty pickpocket Master is found at scene and confesses to seeing the whole murder. Shekhar uncovers some of the gang, and Master identifies the killer Sher Singh, who is put in jail.

Meanwhile, the woman Rekha turns out to be the daughter of the Superintendent of Police, Shekhar's senior, and trust is formed. Shekhar is taken to the criminal's house in an attempt to bribe him to release the prisoner, but the attempt fails. The person who offers the bribe is Kamini. She spikes the drink offered to Shekhar, intoxicates him, and the gang leaves him on the street. He is found by Rekha, who brings him home. At Rekha's birthday party, Shekhar sees Kamini and follows her. Kamini turns out to be a childhood friend of Rekha. The mastermind, Dharamdas, now wants to incriminate Shekhar so that he can be clear of any fear. They take Master to a house and try to persuade him, but fail. The gang kills Sher Singh by sending their people to jail and frame Shekhar for it. This puts the blame on Shekhar for the two murders. He goes to trial and waits for the verdict the next day. By this point, romantic feelings have grown between Rekha and Shekhar. They talk, and Shekhar does not know what to do. He is persuaded by Master to run away, knowing that he will have to prove who the real killer is by getting a chance to investigate.

Shekhar runs away. Dharamdas knows that when Shekhar comes out of hiding, he will have the evidence to expose the mastermind. So, he sends his men to kill Shekhar. They shoot at him, and Shekhar manages to reach the killer's house unseen. He is confronted by Kamini, but he convinces her she can only plan a crime, not commit one. She feels for him, realizes that Dharamdas is evil and that she should no longer be a criminal, and nurtures Shekhar nearly to health.

Dharamdas returns and barely sees Shekhar escape into a hidden dungeon. Kamini follows, and it is Kamini and Shekhar vs. Dharamdas in a cat-and-mouse chase in a maze of hidden corridors and rooms. Kamini and Shekhar escape, and Shekhar calls the police station, saying that he is surrendering himself. Just before he reaches the gate of the police station, Kamini is shot by Dharamdas' men, and then Rekha's father tries to get a full idea of the picture. Shekhar explains that Dharamdas is the mastermind, yet the Chief does not believe him. Shekhar explains the whole thing and that if Kamini regains consciousness, she will testify. Yet he still has to prove that Dharamdas is the criminal, so the Chief can see for himself, and so they have confirmation that he is the criminal in case Kamini does not survive.

They plant an article in the newspaper saying that Kamini will testify, knowing Dharamdas will try to kill her in the hospital. They switch Kamini into Room 15, and tell the desk clerk to tell Dharamdas that Kamini is in Room 13, where they will be waiting for him. Dharamdas comes just before Shekhar and the Chief give up, and they wait. They realize that they left the door to Room 15 open, and Dharamdas realises the actual room as well. The Chief and Shekhar come just in time before Dharamdas attempts to kill Kamini. Dharamdas is convicted and Shekhar has to face trial for running away. The Chief promises to recommend bail or drop the charges, and Rekha and Shekhar continue their romantic relationship.

== Cast ==
- Dev Anand as CID Inspector Shekhar
- Shakila as Rekha Mathur
- Waheeda Rehman as Kamini
- K. N. Singh as SP Mathur, Rekha's father
- Johnny Walker as Master
- Kum Kum as Master's Girlfriend
- Mehmood as Sher Singh
- Minoo Mumtaz as Dancer
- Bir Sakhuja as Dharamdas
- Tun Tun as Complainant in police station
- Jagdish Raj as Inspector Jagdish
- Paul Sharma as Goon
- Shyam Kapoor as the harmonium player act in the song "Leke Pehla Pehla Pyaar"
- Sheela Vaz as the dancer in "Leke Pehla Pehla Pyaar"

== Soundtrack ==
C.I.D. (Original Motion Picture Soundtrack)

Soundtrack album by O. P. Nayyar
- Released: 30 December 1956
- Recorded: 1956
- Genre: Feature film soundtrack
- Length: 27:05
- Language: Hindi
- Label: Saregama

The music was composed by O. P. Nayyar. All lyrics are by Majrooh Sultanpuri except "Aankhon Hi Aankhon Mein", which was penned by Jan Nisar Akhtar.

Track listing
No.	Title	Singer(s)	Length
1.	"Boojh Mera Kya Naam Re"	Shamshad Begum	4:30
2.	"Yeh Hai Bombay Meri Jaan"	Mohammed Rafi and Geeta Dutt	4:08
3.	"Leke Pehla Pehla Pyaar"	Shamshad Begum, Asha Bhosle and Mohammed Rafi	6:45
4.	"Jaata Kahaan Hai Dewaane"	Geeta Dutt	3:14
5.	"Aankhon Hi Aankhon Mein"	Geeta Dutt & Mohammed Rafi	3:57
6.	"Kahin Pe Nigaahen Kahin Pe Nishaana"	Shamshad Begum	4:31
Total length:			27:05

In an interview, the famous harmonica player Milon Gupta (1933-1995) recounted how "Yeh Hai Bombay Meri Jaan" ("Ae Dil Hai Mushkil") was composed. Gupta, who was then the music arranger for O.P. Nayyar would often play short tunes on the basis of which O.P. Nayyar would compose entire songs. One day, Gupta, Guru Dutt, O.P. Nayyar and Majrooh Sultanpuri were at Famous Studios, and Nayyar asked Gupta to play a tune that he had played for him earlier. Gupta played it and Sultanpuri immediately penned the lyrics for the song. Gupta played the harmonica in the actual song too. However, the tune is not original but rather from an American folk song "Oh My Darling, Clementine".

== Production ==
=== Development ===
Dev Anand and Guru Dutt were friends when they struggled to get a break in films and had promised each other that Dev would give Guru Dutt a film to direct (which he did with Baazi) and Guru Dutt would cast Dev as a hero and direct him. As Guru Dutt did not direct C.I.D. he could fulfill only half his promise. The scriptwriter was Inder Raj Anand, father of actor-filmmaker Tinnu Anand.

=== Casting ===
Guru Dutt had spotted Waheeda Rehman in a Telugu movie and cast her in Pyaasa (1957), but gave her a key supporting role in C.I.D. to prepare her for Pyaasa. The choreography of this film was done by Zohra Sehgal. The costumes were credited to a debutant, Bhanumati, who is better known as Bhanu Athaiya. Johnny Walker and Kum Kum as his girlfriend offer a comedy track and social commentary on the honest criminals trying to get by. They interact with Bombay in a way that is more direct and hands-on than the others, and they know the ins-and-outs of the cops and robbers' games. Mehmood was the most effective when he had no lines. He looked the part, but sounds a little too hammy. Anyway, the boss takes no chances and has Sher Singh bumped off, and frames Shekhar for both murders. Produced by Guru Dutt and directed by Raj Khosla, C.I.D. is an entertaining and engaging thriller. Pitting a suave Dev Anand against a shadowy criminal mastermind, the story is told with tempo and light and shade. Add in the lush O.P Nayyar songs, a young and minxy Waheeda Rehman dancing to choreography by Zohra Sehgal, Johnny Walker actually being funny, and there is so much to love. There are a few points of judicial process that seem unlikely, but not enough to detract from the overall enjoyment of an accomplished yarn.

Assisting Raj Khosla on C.I.D. were Pramod Chakraborty and Bhappi Sonie who went on to become successful directors in their own right. One of the lyricists was Jan Nisar Akhtar, who wrote "Aankhon Hi Aankhon Mein." The song "Ae Dil Hain Mushkil" (also known as "Yeh Hai Bombay Meri Jaan"), performed by Mohammed Rafi and Geeta Dutt, is excellent for all times in the film.

== Release ==
The film was released on 30 July 1956 with a grand ceremony at the Strand, Minerva, Kohinoor and other theatres in Bombay (now known as Mumbai). It received critical as well as commercial success. The film was the highest-grossing film of 1956. Guru Dutt had reportedly gifted Raj Khosla a swanky foreign car after the success of C. I. D.

=== Critical reception ===
C. I. D received positive reviews from critics, with the music and performances gaining the most attention. On 14 September 1956, Filmfare wrote, "Designed as a crime thriller, C. I. D, directed by Raj Khosla, is a sleek entertainer which moves at a swift pace and is interspersed with good songs". However, the critic felt that the story had many inconsistencies due to lack of proper understanding of police-court procedure and crime detection methods. Nonetheless, the critic appreciated the performance of the lead cast writing, "As the police inspector, Dev Anand is very convincing. Johnny Walker is exceptionally good, while Kum Kum serves excellently as his foil." He felt that the film's highpoint was O. P. Nayyar's music. Concluding, the critic wrote, "choreography wasn't particularly good."
