= Sailaab (1956 film) =

1956 film

- Poster
- Directed by: Guru Dutt
- Produced by: Mukul Roy
- Starring: Geeta Bali
- Music by: Mukul Roy
- Release date: 1956
- Country: India
- Language: Hindi

Sailaab is a 1956 Hindi movie which tells the story of Gautam, a rich young man, who goes to Assam to visit his father's tea plantation. The plane in which he is travelling is forced to make an emergency landing due to bad weather. Gautam gets hurt and has amnesia. He falls in love with a young woman Kanchan, who responds to him even though she is part of a religious community that doesn't allow its members to marry. The film was directed by Guru Dutt and produced by Guru Dutt's wife, Geeta Dutt's brother, Mukul Roy. It stars Geeta Bali, as Kanchan and Abhi Bhattacharya as Gautam. Smriti Biswas, Bipin Gupta and Helen.

Baburao Patel, the most significant film critic of the time, noted, "Boring, stupid and incoherent – that is Sailaab in three words. It is a picture made without imagination and without any thoughts of mercy to the spectator. As an entertainment it is miserably amateurish but as a torture it is perfect."

== Plot ==
Gautam (Abhi Bhattacharya), a rich young man goes to Assam to visit his father's tea plantation. The plane in which Gautam is travelling is forced to make an emergency landing due to bad weather. Gautam gets hurt and has amnesia. He falls in love with a young woman Kanchan (Geeta Bali), who responds to him even though she is part of a religious community that doesn't allow its members to marry. Gautam's father takes him back to Calcutta. Gautam's mother dies and the shock of her death brings back Gautam's memory. But as his memory returns he forgets Kanchan. Kanchan comes to Calcutta in search of Gautam and sees that he fails to recognize her. She returns to her community deciding to renounce the world. In time, Gautam is able to recollect his association with her and he goes after her to Assam. The lovers are reunited.

== Cast ==
- Ram Singh
- Geeta Bali
- Smriti Biswas
- Abhi Bhattacharya
- Bipin Gupta
- Helen

== Soundtrack ==
Mukul Roy was also the music director of this movie which had good songs. The list of songs of the movie is as follows:

- "Hai Yeh Duniya Kaunsi" – Hemant Kumar
- "Hai Yeh Duniya Kaunsi" – Geeta Dutt
- "Baje Dil" – Lakshmi Roy
- "Yeh Rut Yeh Raat Jawaan" – Geeta Dutt
- "Tan Pe Rang Sakhi" – Geeta Dutt, Chorus
- "Jiyra Baat Nahin Maane" – Geeta Dutt
- "Kisi Ke Pyar Ki Tasveer" (Chand ke Aansoo Shabnam Bankar) – Geeta Dutt
- "Aa Gayi Aa Gayi Re Raat Rang Bhar Aa Gayi" – Geeta Dutt
- "Nahin Deri Karo Meri Baiyaan Dharo" – Geeta Dutt
- "Prabhu Aayi Pujaran Tere Angana" – Geeta Dutt
