= Jagmohan Sursagar =

Indian singer and composer (1918–2003)

- Born: 6 September 1918; Calcutta, West Bengal, India
- Died: 4 September 2003 (aged 84); Kolkata, West Bengal, India
- Other name: Jaganmoy Mitra
- Occupations: Singer; Music composer
- Years active: 1938-1999
- Known for: Indian light music
- Awards: Padma Shri

Jagmohan Sursagar, born Jaganmoy Mitra (1918–2003), was an Indian singer and music composer, best known for his composition, "Pyar Ki Yeh Talkhiyan", sung by Lata Mangeshkar in the 1955 Hindi language movie, Sardar. He sang several film and non-film songs for Kamal Dasgupta, renowned Bengali music composer, "O Varsha Ke Pahale Badal" from Meghdoot (1945), being the most notable among them. He performed on many stages, including the Yadein show, organised by Sangeet Manjari, in 1971, and sang alongside many old time singers. The Government of India awarded him the fourth highest civilian award of the Padma Shri in 1999. Saregama, the Indian music company, has brought out a collection of his songs, under the title, The Best Of-Sursagar Jagmohan, which features 21 of his tracks.

== Selected tracks ==
1. "Ulfat Ki Saza Do"
2. "Deewana Tumhara"
3. "Mujhe Khamosh"
4. "Prem Ki Rut Chal"
5. "Dil Deke Dard Liya"
6. "Yeh Na Bata Sakoonga Main"
7. "Ankhon Mein Chhupalo"
8. "Yeh Mana Ke Tum"
9. "Jal Rahe Hain"
10. "Niras Mein Aas Prabhu"
11. "Meri Ankhen Bani"
12. "Pyari Tum Kitni"
13. "Mat Kar Saaj Singar"
14. "Tum Mere Samne"
15. "Sapnon Men Mujhko"
16. "Mujhe Na Sapno Se"
17. "O Varsha Ke Pehle Badal"
18. "Chand Hai Mehman'
19. 'Yeh Chand Nahin"
20. 'Ek Bar Muskura Do"

== See also ==
- List of Bollywood films of 1955
