= Baaz (1953 film) =

1953 film by Guru Dutt

- Directed by: Guru Dutt
- Written by: Guru Dutt; Lalchand Bismil; Sarshar Sailani
- Produced by: Haridarshan
- Starring: Geeta Bali; Guru Dutt; K. N. Singh; Johnny Walker
- Cinematography: V. K. Murthy
- Edited by: Y.G. Chawhan
- Music by: O. P. Nayyar
- Release date: 1953
- Running time: 150 minutes
- Country: India
- Language: Hindi

Baaz (lit. 'Falcon') is a 1953 Hindi action film directed by Guru Dutt. This film is Guru Dutt's first starring film, an action film packed with adventure staged mainly on a ship.

== Plot ==
Set in the 16th century, the Malabar Coast. General Barbosa (KN Singh) signs a treaty with the queen (Sulochana) of a small state giving the Portuguese right to trade in exchange for military protection. With the help of the queen's nephew Jaswant (Ramsingh), he begins to meddle in the administration as well. He arrests merchant Ramzan Ali and his friend Narayan Das. Das' daughter Nisha (Geeta Bali) tries to save her father but is caught by Barbosa and both are sold to a cruel Portuguese pirate Cabral. Cabral kills Narayan Das. Nisha rouses her fellow slaves to revolt against Cabral and once Cabral is killed Nisha becomes a pirate queen pillaging all Portuguese ships in sight. One such ship includes heir to the throne Prince Ravi (Guru Dutt), a Portuguese woman Rosita (Kuldip Kaur) and a court astrologer (Johnny Walker). Nisha spares their lives as Ravi had saved her life earlier. They inevitably fall in love. Ravi joins the mutineers without revealing his identity. Back on shore, Ravi learns Jaswant is to be crowned king. Ravi is arrested and sentenced to death. Nisha saves him and they join forces with other local chiefs to defeat Barbosa.

== Cast ==
- Guru Dutt as Prince Ravi
- Geeta Bali as Nisha
- K. N. Singh as General Barborosa
- Johnny Walker as Court Astrologer
- Yashodhra Katju as Nisha's Friend
- Ruby Myers as Raj Mata
- Kuldip Kaur as Rosita
- Jankidas as Ramzan Ali Saudagar

== Soundtrack ==
The music was composed by O. P. Nayyar and the lyrics were penned by Majrooh Sultanpuri.

Song	Singer
"Mujhe Dekho, Hasrat Ki"	Talat Mahmood
"Jo Dil Ki Baat Hoti Hai"	Mohammed Rafi
"Majhi Albele"	Geeta Dutt
"Zara Samne Aa"	Geeta Dutt
"Ae Dil, Ae Deewane"	Geeta Dutt
"Tare Chandni Afsane"	Geeta Dutt
"Jago Jago Savera Hua"	Geeta Dutt
"Ae Watan Ke Naujawan"	Geeta Dutt
