= Miss Coca Cola =

- Directed by: Kedar Kapoor
- Produced by: Kuldip Kaur (Danny Films)
- Starring: Shammi Kapoor; Geeta Bali; Helen; Johnny Walker; Kuldip Kaur; Minoo Mumtaz
- Music by: O. P. Nayyar
- Release date: 1955
- Country: India
- Language: Hindi

Miss Coca Cola is a 1955 Indian Hindi-language romantic thriller film directed by Kedar Kapoor. The film was an early example of a brand (Coca Cola) being used in a film title. Some of the films that made use of the trade name were Shri 420, Chalti Ka Naam Gaadi, An Evening In Paris and others such as Taal and Yaadein. The film was produced by Kuldip Kaur, who also starred in this film, under the banner Danny Films and had music composed by O. P. Nayyar, with lyrics by Majrooh Sultanpuri. The film was one of the earlier Shammi Kapoor hits for lyricist Sultanpuri, both had previously collaborated in Mehbooba (1954) and particularly, Shama Parwana (1954). The duo went on to create some iconic numbers in the coming years.

The cast included Shammi Kapoor, Geeta Bali, Kuldip Kaur, Johnny Walker, Lalita Pawar, Om Prakash, Helen, Kamal Kapoor and Minoo Mumtaz. The film was a commercial success at the box office. Johnny Walker and Helen provided the comic interest as native Spanish lovers.

The film revolved around a poor girl, Ganga, who becomes a night club dancer called "Miss Coca Cola" when her father is implicated in a murder case. Helped by Kamal, a rich young man, she is able to prove her father's innocence.

== Plot ==
Ganga (Geeta Bali) comes from a poor family and lives with her father, sister Madhu, and brother Pappu. When her father is unable to pay the Rs. 1000 dowry money to the bridegroom at Ganga's wedding, the marriage is called off by the groom's family. Desperate, Ganga's father resorts to stealing the money from a man who is subsequently killed. The blame for the murder falls on Ganga's father who is arrested. The three siblings try to eke out a living by doing odd jobs. Pappu meets with an accident when he gets hit by Kamal's (Shammi Kapoor) car. Kamal helps the family and Ganga starts working as a night club dancer and goes by the name, Miss Coca Cola. Kamal and Ganga fall in love and together they try to find the real killer. Eventually they succeed and Ganga's father is freed.

== Soundtrack ==
The music was composed by O. P. Nayyar, with lyrics by Majrooh Sultanpuri who set a benchmark by finishing all 8 soundtrack lyrics in a mere 24 hours. The playback singers were Geeta Dutt, Mohammed Rafi, Shamshad Begum, Mukesh and Asha Bhosle. This film marked the first time when Mukesh sang a song for O. P. Nayyar. Their next collaboration came over a decade later in Sambandh (1969) followed by Ek Bar Mooskura Do (1972).

=== Song list ===
Song	Singer
"Koi Jab Dard Ka Mara Kabhi Aansoo Bahata Hai"	Mohammed Rafi, Shamshad Begum
"Sach Sach Bol"	Geeta Dutt
"Ban Dhadkan Kajrare"	Geeta Dutt
"Teri Kafir Nigah Kar Gayi"	Geeta Dutt
"Jeena Hai Kya"	Asha Bhosle
"Kabhi Kabhi Mere Dil"	Asha Bhosle
"Zara Humse Nigahen Mila"	Asha Bhosle
"Jhuka Jhukake Nigahen Milayi Jati Hai"	Asha Bhosle, Mukesh
