= Pocket Maar (1956 film) =

- Poster
- Directed by: Harnam Singh Rawail
- Written by: Harnam Singh Rawail
- Produced by: Khushi; Prem Sethi
- Starring: Dev Anand; Geeta Bali; Nadira; Lalita Pawar
- Cinematography: M.W. Mukadam
- Edited by: Pran Mehra
- Music by: Madan Mohan
- Release date: 6 January 1956
- Country: India
- Language: Hindi

Pocket Maar (transl. Pickpocket) is a 1956 Indian Hindi-language crime film. Produced by Prem Sethi and directed by Harnam Singh Rawail the film stars Dev Anand, Geeta Bali and Nadira. The film's music is given by Madan Mohan. Rajendra Kumar, who went on to become a successful star in the coming years, worked both as an assistant director (credited) as well as an actor playing a brief role (uncredited) in the opening scene of this film. The film was remade in Tamil as Thirudathe, in Kannada as Manassakshi and in Telugu as Marina Manishi.

== Plot ==
The movie revolves with the journey of Roshan, a Bombay based pickpocket and gambler. He steals money from a person who commits suicide later. Driven by guilt, he tries to remit this amount to the deceased man's family.

== Cast ==
- Dev Anand as Roshan
- Geeta Bali as Shukal
- Nadira as Rita
- Lalita Pawar as Roshan's mother
- Tun Tun
- Rajendra Kumar As Mukhiram Bairagi (uncredited; voice dubbed)
- Madan Bhandari
- Ramayan Tiwari as Shankar
- Sunder as Manglu mama
- Kumud Tripathi as money lender
- Bhagwan Sinha
- Pratima Devi
- Jagdish Kanwal

== Soundtrack ==
1. "Ye Nayi Nayi Preet Hai, Tu Hi To Mera Meet Hai" – Talat Mahmood, Lata Mangeshkar
2. "Chhoti Si Hai Zindagi Apni Khushi Se Ji" – Lata Mangeshkar
3. "Pyaase Nainon Ki Pyaas Bujhaa Le" – Lata Mangeshkar
4. "Duniya Ke Saath Chal Pyare" – Geeta Dutt
5. "Kisi Ke Thukra Kar Armaan Na Ja O Bedardi Nadan" – Lata Mangeshkar
6. "Ladi Aankh Se Aankh Mohabbat Ho Gai" – Lata Mangeshkar, Mohammed Rafi
7. "Teri Gali Kaise Aaoon Sajna" – Lata Mangeshkar
8. "Balma Anadi Manga De Ghoda Gadi" – Lata Mangeshkar
