= Char Paise =

- Directed by: N. K. Ziri
- Starring: Kishore Kumar; Shyama
- Music by: B. D. Burman
- Release date: 1955
- Country: India
- Language: Hindi

Char Paise(transl. "Four Cents") is a 1955 Indian crime drama Hindi film starring Kishore Kumar, and Shyama.

== Plot ==
Gangsters first try unknowingly to do business with a plain-clothed police officer, and after failing, they try to disrupt his personal life.

== Cast ==
- Kishore Kumar as CID Inspector Mohan
- Shyama as Seema
- Johnny Walker as Dasu
- Agha as Basu
- Jayant as Chandermohan "Chandu"

== Soundtrack ==
Song	Singer
"Chhan Chhan Baje Rupaiya"	Kishore Kumar
"Shama Parwana"	Lata Mangeshkar
"Majhi Mere Naiya Ko"	Lata Mangeshkar
"Badnaam Na Ho Jaun"	Lata Mangeshkar
"Tere Liye Hai Pyar Mera"	Lata Mangeshkar
"Dil Hai Nishana Naina Ke"	Asha Bhosle
