= Marina Manishi =

- Theatrical release poster
- Directed by: C. S. Rao
- Screenplay by: C. S. Rao
- Story by: Bhamidipati Radhakrishna
- Produced by: S. L. Nehata; S. Soudappan
- Starring: N. T. Rama Rao; Vijaya Nirmala
- Cinematography: J. Satyanarayana
- Edited by: V. Chakrapani
- Music by: T. V. Raju
- Production company: Srikanth Productions
- Release date: 24 September 1970
- Running time: 171 minutes
- Country: India
- Language: Telugu

Marina Manishi (transl. Transformed Person) is a 1970 Indian Telugu-language action-drama film co-written and directed by C. S. Rao. It stars N. T. Rama Rao and Vijaya Nirmala, with music composed by T. V. Raju. The movie is a remake of 1956 Hindi movie Pocket Maar.

== Cast ==
- N. T. Rama Rao as Raju
- Vijaya Nirmala as Gowri
- Satyanarayana as Bhupati & Rangoon Ranganna (dual role)
- V. Nagayya as Baba
- Ramakrishna as Murthy
- Prabhakar Reddy as Captain Dr. Brundavanam
- Allu Ramalingaiah as Senaiah
- Chalam as Gopi
- Mukkamala as Judge
- Jyothi Lakshmi as Taara
- Manimala as Janaki
- Hemalatha as Lakshmamma
- Malathi as Rajamma
- Sachu as Radha

== Soundtrack ==
Marina Manishi

Film score by T. V. Raju
- Released: 1970
- Genre: Soundtrack
- Length: 26:21
- Producer: T. V. Raju

Music composed by T. V. Raju.

S. No.	Song title	Lyrics	Singers	length
1	"Em Chestavoy Bullemma"	Dasaradhi	S. P. Balasubrahmanyam, S. Janaki	2:28
2	"Chinavada Oy Velatava"	C. Narayana Reddy	K..J.Yesudas, Vasantha	4:06
3	"Chakkani Dongoda"	Kosaraju	Vasantha	3:39
4	"Nuvve Naaku Taaraka Mantram"	Rajasri	S. P. Balasubrahmanyam, L. R. Eswari	3:36
5	"Dongatanam Panikiradu"	Dasaradhi	S. P. Balasubrahmanyam	4:21
6	"Ayyayyo"	Dasaradhi	L. R. Eswari	2:40
7	"Amrutam Kaavala"	Dasaradhi	P. Susheela	5:31
