= Geeta Bali =

Indian actress (1930–1965)

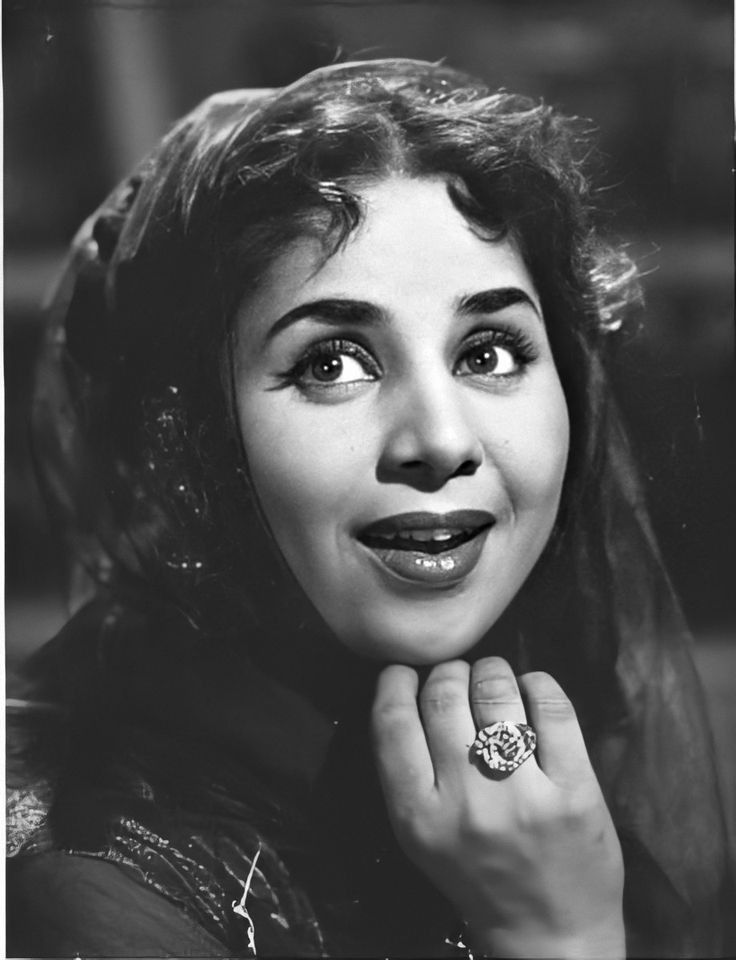
- Geeta Bali in Aji Bas Shukriya (1958)
- Born: Harikirtan Kaur; 30 November 1930; Amritsar, Punjab Province, British India (present-day Punjab, India)
- Died: 21 January 1965 (aged 34); Bombay, Maharashtra, India
- Years active: 1942–1964
- Spouse: Shammi Kapoor (m. 1955)
- Children: 2, including Aditya Raj Kapoor
- Family: Kapoor family (by marriage)

Geeta Bali (born as Harkirtan Kaur; 30 November 1930 ‒ 21 January 1965) was an Indian actress, who worked in Hindi films. She is regarded among the finest actresses in the history of Indian cinema, Bali acted in over 75 films in a career spanning over two decades. She was twice nominated for Filmfare Awards.

She started her career as a child artist with The Cobbler (1942) and had her first success with Sohag Raat (1948). After working in Badi Bahen (1949), Bali went onto establish herself as a leading lady of the 50s with films such as Bawre Nain (1950), Albela (1951), Baazi (1951), Jaal (1952), Anand Math (1952), Vachan (1955), Milap (1955), Faraar (1955), Jailor (1958) and Mr. India (1961). For Vachan, she was nominated for Filmfare Award for Best Actress.

She married actor Shammi Kapoor in 1955, with whom she has two children including actor Aditya Raj Kapoor. Bali died in 1965 due to small pox.

== Early life ==
Geeta Bali was born as Harkirtan Kaur in Amritsar in the Punjab Province of British India on 30 November 1930. She had an elder sister Hardarshan Kaur, whose daughter is former film actress Yogeeta Bali. Bali was trained in classical dance, horse riding and Gatka. Her father, Pandit Kartar Singh was a religious preacher. As a child, Geeta was selected to sing for a programme at the All India Radio, Lahore. Her family would travel to Burma, Sri Lanka where Bali and her sister used to give stage performances. She was noticed by Pt. Gyan Shankar, a choreographer who selected her for a documentary film, "The Cobbler" (1942) which was her debut film.

== Career ==
Bali started her film career as a child actress, at the age of 12, with the film The Cobbler (1942). She made her debut as a lead actress in Badnaami (1946). Bali went onto act in over 75 films. Sohag Raat (1948) and Badi Bahen (1949) were her early successes.

She became a star in the 1950s. She worked with her future brother-in-law Raj Kapoor in Bawre Nain (1950) and with her future father-in-law Prithviraj Kapoor in Anand Math, both of which were successful. Unlike other actresses who gave up films after marrying into the Kapoor family, Bali continued her career until her death. Bali helped Surinder Kapoor become a producer.

Bali was widely known for her comic timing and her range as an actor. Bali had her best onscreen pairing with Dev Anand, with whom she worked in several successful films including Baazi (1951), Jaal (1952), Ferry (1954), Milap (1955), Faraar and Pocket Maar (1956). She received a Filmfare Award for Best Actress nomination for Vachan (1955).

She worked with her husband Shammi Kapoor in films such as Miss Coca Cola (1955), Rangeen Raaten (1956), in which she sang a song and Coffee House (1957). Her other notable films are Dulari (1949), Nishana (1950), Albela (1951), Albeli (1955), and Kavi (1955). Her last film was Jab Se Tumhe Dekha Hai in 1963.

== Personal life and death ==
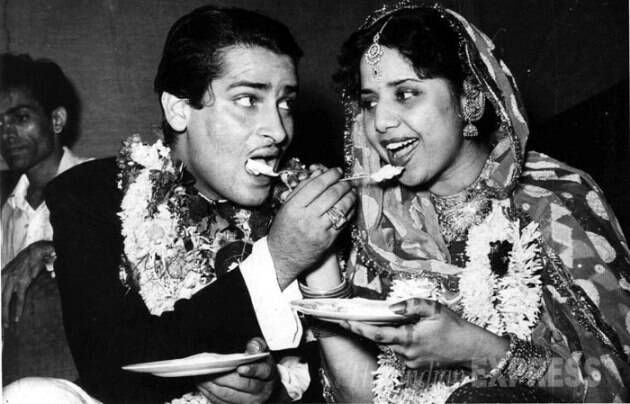
Shammi Kapoor and Geeta Bali after their wedding

Bali met actor Shammi Kapoor in 1955, during the film Miss Coca Cola. They fell in love during the shooting of the film Rangeen Raaten, where he was the leading actor and she played a male character. Four months later, the couple got married on 23 August 1955 at Banganga Temple, near Malabar Hill of Mumbai. They had a son, Aditya Raj Kapoor, on 1 July 1956, at Shirodkar's Hospital, Mumbai, a year after they were married. Five years later, on 8 August 1961, they had a daughter, Kanchan Kapoor née Desai.

Bali contracted smallpox around December, 1964 while shooting for the film "Rano" in Amritsar. In January, she returned to Bombay where she fell severely ill and subsequently died on 21 January 1965, at the age of 34, due to illness from smallpox. She was cremated at the Banganga crematorium. Ironically, it was near the same place where she had married 10 years prior.

After her death, Kapoor married Neila Devi, from Bhojapara, Gujarat, on 27 January 1969, who also took care of Bali's children.

== Artistry and legacy ==
"I consider her one of our great artistes. There was nobody who performed like her. She was very versatile. When she entered the industry, everybody had written her off. I believed in her and made her a star."

— Director Kidar Sharma on Geeta Bali

Bali is regarded as one of the greatest actors of Indian cinema. In 2022, she was placed in Outlook India's "75 Best Bollywood Actresses" list. One of the leading actresses of the '50s, Bali has appeared in Box Office India's "Top Actresses" list in 1951, 1952 and 1953. Bali was the first woman in the Kapoor family who did not give up acting after marriage.

Sukanya Verma of Rediff.com noted, "Geeta Bali’s terrific comic timing and natural manners made her stand out in a crowd of stilted, self-aware beauties. Yet, she was equally adept at moving the viewer in vulnerable, wounded parts." Megha Mathur of The Quint termed her one of the "most interesting actresses" of her time. Her son Aditya Raj Kapoor said, "If you see the way Shammi Kapoor danced, that was Geeta Bali’s personality." Pia Krishnankutty of The Print said that Bali had a "captivating on-screen presence" and wrote, "Given how she acted in a range of genres, whether tragedy, drama or comedy, Bali never fell into the trap of a typecast."

Subhash K. Jha of Firstpost termed her "ebullient" and said, "Geeta Bali was the original Sridevi…perky, bubbly and effervescent." Dinesh Raheja noted, "Geeta Bali's reputation as an actress rests more on her performances than her roles. Natural, spontaneous and gifted with a spot-on sense of comic timing." Journalist Rauf Ahmed added Bali on his "Biggest stars in Hindi filmdom" list and noted, "Bali was the first natural. The earliest tomboy among the actresses. Earthy, effervescent and uninhibited, she shed coyness and simpering so characteristic of the early Hindi film heroine."

In the 2016 film Ekk Albela, Bali was portrayed by actress Vidya Balan.

== Filmography ==
Year	Title	Role	Notes	Ref.
1942	The Cobbler		Child artist	
1946	Badnaami			
1946	Kahan Gaye			
1948	Sohag Raat	Kamini "Kammo"		
1948	Jalsa			
1948	Nai Reet			
1949	Neki Aur Badi	Baby		
1949	Dulari	Kasturi		
1949	Badi Bahen	Kiran		
1949	Bansariya			
1949	Garibi			
1949	Bholi	Bholi		
1949	Dil Ki Duniya			
1949	Girls' School	School student		
1950	Nishana	Chanda		
1950	Chhai	Gujri	Punjabi film	
1950	Bawre Nain	Tara		
1950	Bhai Bahen	Bahen		
1950	Gulnar			
1950	Shadi Ki Raat	Dulhan		
1950	Balo			
1951	Baazi	Leena		
1951	Ghayal			
1951	Albela	Asha		
1951	Nakhare			
1951	Bedardi			
1951	Johari			
1952	Jaal	Maria		
1952	Raag Rang			
1952	Anand Math	Shanti Dev Sharma		
1952	Betaab			
1952	Jalpari			
1952	Najariya			
1952	Neelam Pari	Pari		
1952	Zalzala			
1953	Bahu Beti			
1953	Baaz	Nisha		
1953	Jhamela			
1953	Firdaus			
1953	Gunah			
1953	Naina	Naina		
1954	Kashti / Ferry	Juhi		
1954	Daku Ki Ladki			
1954	Suhaagan			
1954	Ameer			
1954	Chora Chori			
1955	Jawab	Geeta		
1955	Vachan	Kamla	Nominated – Filmfare Award for Best Actress	
1955	Sau Ka Note			
1955	Miss Coca Cola	Ganga		
1955	Milap	Asha Dayal		
1955	Albeli	Geeta		
1955	Faraar	Kitty	Also producer	
1955	Kavi	Basanti	Nominated – Filmfare Award for Best Supporting Actress	
1955	Bara Dari	Gauri		
1956	Hotel			
1956	Inspector	Varsha		
1956	Pocket Maar	Shukal		
1956	Sailaab	Kanchan		
1956	Rangeen Raaten	Gulu		
1956	Lalten			
1957	Coffee House			
1958	Jailor	Chhaya		
1958	Aji Bas Shukriya	Geeta Kumar		
1958	Do Mastane	Geeta Kumar		
1958	10 O'Clock	Geeta		
1958	Mujrim	Hotel Dancer	Special appearance in song "Chanda Chandni Mein Jab Chamke"	
1959	C. I. D. Girl	Chand		
1959	Nai Raahen			
1959	Mohar			
1960	Bade Ghar Ki Bahu	Lata		
1961	Mr. India	Bembi		
1961	Sapne Suhane	Jamuna		
1963	Jab Se Tumhe Dekha Hai	Mohini	Last film	
1965	Rano		Filming abandoned	

== Discography ==
Year	Film	Song	Composer	Ref.
1956	Rangeen Raaten	"Main Ek Shola Aag Babola Re"	Roshan	

== Accolades ==
Year	Award	Category	Work	Result	Ref.
1956	3rd Filmfare Awards	Best Actress	Vachan	Nominated	
1956	3rd Filmfare Awards	Best Supporting Actress	Kavi	Nominated	
