= Thirudathe =

1961 film by P. Neelakantan

- Theatrical release poster
- Directed by: P. Neelakantan
- Screenplay by: Kannadasan; Ma. Lakshmanan
- Story by: Chinna Annamalai
- Produced by: V. Arunachalam
- Starring: M. G. Ramachandran; B. Saroja Devi; M. N. Nambiar
- Cinematography: V. Ramamoorthy
- Edited by: R. Devarajan
- Music by: S. M. Subbaiah Naidu
- Production company: A. L. S. Productions
- Distributed by: Emgeeyar Pictures
- Release date: 23 March 1961
- Running time: 173 minutes
- Country: India
- Language: Tamil

Thirudathe (/θɪrudɑːðeɪ/ transl. Do not steal) is a 1961 Indian Tamil-language crime drama film directed by P. Neelakantan. A remake of the Hindi film Pocket Maar (1956), it stars M. G. Ramachandran, B. Saroja Devi and M. N. Nambiar. The film was released on 23 March 1961, and ran for 100 days in theatres.

== Plot ==
Balu is a small-time thief. Once he steals money from a man. This loss devastates the victim—an honest executive—and drives him to his own death. After his death, the family becomes Balu's responsibility, and his attitude toward stealing changes when his mother discovers her son was a thief and sacrifices her life. How the family is saved forms the rest of the story.

== Cast ==
- M. G. Ramachandran as Balu
- B. Saroja Devi as Savithri
- M. N. Nambiar as Ponnambalam / Duraisingam
- K. A. Thangavelu as Jambu
- V. Nagayya as the orphanage owner
- M. N. Rajam as Tharaa
- A. Karunanidhi as Marikozhundhu
- Kula Deivam V. R. Rajagopal
- M. Saroja as Padma
- K. Kannan as Singaram
- G. Sakunthala as Kaveri
- S. Rama Rao as Money lender
- M. K. Mustafa as Raju
- Lakshmiprabha

== Production ==
The film, a remake of the Hindi film Pocket Maar (1956), was directed by P. Neelakandan and V. Arunachalam under A. L. S. Productions, with story written by Chinna Annamalai and dialogues written by Kannadasan and Ma. Lakshmanan. Lakshmanan came up with two titles for the film: Thirudathe (transl. Do not steal) and Nalladhukku Kaalamillai (transl. Goodness stands no chance), recommending the latter. M. G. Ramachandran objected, believing that audiences would think the title would represent his own opinion, and that the film actually exhorts people not to do wrong. Hence, the former title was finalised. B. Saroja Devi was cast as the lead actress at Ramachandran's insistence.

== Soundtrack ==
The music was composed by S. M. Subbaiah Naidu. The song "Ennaruge Nee Irundhal" was composed by Viswanathan–Ramamoorthy. It was recorded for an earlier film produced by A. L. S. Productions, but was not used due to that film's length. With the permission of S. M. Subbaiah Naidu, producer A. L. Srinivasan used that song in this film. However, credit was not given to Viswanathan–Ramamoorthy in the title.

Song	Singers	Lyrics	Length
"Acha Baguthacha"	S. C. Krishnan & A. G. Rathnamala	Ra. Pazhanisami	02:10
"Aasey Machchan.... Azhagaan Chinna Ponnu"	Seerkazhi Govindarajan & Jikki	Ku. Sa. Krishnamurthy	02:49
"Anthisayum Nerathiley"	A. L. Raghavan & A. G. Rathnamala	Ku. Sa. Krishnamurthy	
"En Aruge Nee Irundhaal"; Viswanathan–Ramamoorthy	P. B. Sreenivas & P. Susheela	Kannadasan	02:55
"Kannum Kannum Sernthathu"	P. B. Sreenivas & K. Jamuna Rani	Kannadasan	04:01
"Mama Mama Makku Mama"	P. Susheela &	Ku. Ma. Balasubramaniam	02:24
"O Mister Baalu"	Jikki	Ku. Ma. Balasubramaniam	02:47
"Thirudaadhe Paapa Thirudaadhe"	T. M. Soundararajan	Pattukkottai Kalyanasundaram	03:21
"Anbale Thannuyirai"	Seerkazhi Govindarajan	M. K. Athmanathan	01:11

== Release and reception ==
Thirudathe was released on 23 March 1961. Kanthan of Kalki gave the film a favourable review for many aspects, including Neelakanta's direction, the cast performances and the music. The film was a commercial success, running for 100 days in theatre. According to Ashish Rajadhyaksha and Paul Willemen in the book Encyclopedia of Indian Cinema, for Ramachandran this marked a beginning of transition to roles that had "a contemporary setting", as opposed to period settings. Historian M. S. S. Pandian considers the film "inaugurated the MGR persona of a subaltern in the service of society", a trend that continued through the 1970s.

== In popular culture ==
In Andha 7 Naatkal (1981), Gopi (Master Haja Sheriff) sells stolen goods on the street; when police seize the goods, the poster on which the items were kept is revealed to be that of Thirudathe.

== Bibliography ==
- Kannan, R. (2017). MGR: A Life. India: Penguin Random House. ISBN 978-93-86495-88-4.
- Rajadhyaksha, Ashish; Willemen, Paul (1998) [1994]. Encyclopaedia of Indian Cinema. British Film Institute and Oxford University Press. ISBN 0-19-563579-5.
