= Uran Khatola =

An uran khatola (Hindustani: उड़न खटोला, اُڑن کھٹولا) is a flying vehicle in the traditional folktales of North India and Pakistan. The term literally means 'flying bedstead' or 'flying cot' but in folklore the term is used more expansively to cover any flying vehicle. In modern-day Indian and Pakistani slang, it can refer to any vehicle that flies (such as a helicopter or an airplane) or appears to glide through the air (such as a gondola lift).

== See also ==
- Vimana
- Magic carpet
