= Vachan =

- Poster
- Directed by: Raj Rishi
- Written by: Mukhram Sharma
- Produced by: Devendra Goel
- Starring: Geeta Bali; Rajendra Kumar; Madan Puri
- Cinematography: M. W. Mukaddam
- Edited by: R. V. Shrikhande
- Music by: Ravi
- Production company: Goel Cine Corporation
- Distributed by: Goel Cine Corporation
- Release date: 1 July 1955
- Country: India
- Language: Hindi

Vachan (English: Word) is a 1955 Indian Bollywood film directed by Raj Rishi and produced by Devendra Goel. The film stars Geeta Bali and Rajendra Kumar in lead roles. The film marked the debut of composer Ravi. It was also Rajendra Kumar's first major film role. It received two nominations at the annual Filmfare Awards.

== Plot ==
Kamala lives a poor lifestyle in a small town in Uttar Pradesh along with her widowed dad, Dinanath, who works as an accountant, and two younger brothers, Kumar and Kishore. Her father's biggest dream is to get Kamla married to her lover, a wealthy man named Prem, and ensure that Kumar and Kishore get properly educated. As Dinanath's eyesight deteriorates, the quality of his work deteriorates and he loses his job. However, his employer, Laxmidas, promises to hire Dinanath's son Kumar once he completes his education. On the day of the results, Kumar dies in an accident. Devastated and desperate, Dinanath tries to commit suicide, but he is hospitalised. Later he recovers but loses his vision completely. Kamla's wedding is consequently cancelled, and Prem reluctantly marries Shyama. Kamla starts working and takes it upon herself to look after her dad and Kishore. Years pass by, Kishore grows up, graduates, gets a job, and marries a young girl named Tara, who happens to be the niece of Kashiram, Prem's friend. The family settles down to a fairly harmonious relationship which is shattered when Kishore and Tara accuse Kamla of stealing household items; following this incident, Kamla and her dad leave the house, and Kamla soon gets a job as a nurse for a sick Shyama, while her husband Prem is absent, without knowing that she is actually her ex-lover's wife.

== Cast ==
- Geeta Bali as Kamala
- Rajendra Kumar as Kishore
- Madan Puri as Laxmidas
- S. K. Prem as the father of Kamala, Kumar & Kishore
- Radhakishan as Ghasi Ram
- Balraj as Prem
- Neeroo as Shyama
- Praveen Paul as Prem's widowed mother

== Music ==
Song	Singer(s)	Lyricist
"O Babu, O Jaanewale Babu, Ek Paisa De De" (Duet version)	Mohammed Rafi & Asha Bhosle	Ravi Shankar Sharma
"O Babu, O Jaanewale Babu, Ek Paisa De De" (Male solo version)	Mohammed Rafi	Ravi Shankar Sharma
"O Babu, O Jaanewale Babu, Ek Paisa De De" (Female solo version)	Asha Bhosle	Ravi Shankar Sharma
"Chanda Mama Door Ke"	Asha Bhosle	Ravi Shankar Sharma
"Woh Din Kahaan Gaye Mere"	Asha Bhosle	Bharat Vyas
"Is Jahaan Mein Hamen Aise Jeena Pada"	Asha Bhosle	Prem Dhawan
"Zara Seekh Lo Ankhiyon Sharmana"	Asha Bhosle	Prem Dhawan
"Yun Hi Chupke Chupke Bahaane Bahaane"	Asha Bhosle & Ravi Shankar Sharma	Prem Dhawan
"Jab Liya Haath Mein Haath, Nibhana Saath"	Mohammed Rafi & Asha Bhosle	Prem Dhawan

== Awards ==
The film received two nominations at the 1956 Filmfare Awards. Geeta Bali received her first and only competitive Best Actress nomination at the Filmfare (she was a Best Supporting Actress nominee in 1956). Nominations are listed below:

- Nominated, Filmfare Best Actress Award - Geeta Bali
- Nominated, Filmfare Best Story Award - Mukhram Sharma
