= Johnny Walker (Indian actor) =

Indian film actor and comedian (died 2003)

- Born: Badruddin Jamaluddin Kazi; November 11, 1926; Indore, Indore State, British India (present-day Madhya Pradesh, India)
- Died: 29 July 2003 (aged 76); Mumbai, Maharashtra, India
- Occupations: Actor, comedian
- Years active: 1951–1997
- Spouse: Noorjahan (m. 1955)
- Children: 6
- Relatives: Shakila (sister-in-law)

Badruddin Jamaluddin Kazi (11 November 1926 (Note: Walker's son gives 11 November 1926 as his date of birth. See #Early life for details.) – 29 July 2003), professionally known as Johnny Walker, was an Indian actor and comedian who acted in around 300 films. He was best known for his humorous roles in Indian films, notably being typecast as a hapless drunkard.

== Early life ==
Badruddin Jamaluddin Kazi was born in Indore, British India (present-day Madhya Pradesh, India), one of twelve children of a weaving teacher. Walker's son, Nasirr Khan, gives his date of birth as 11 November 1926, while secondary sources generally place his date of birth in 1924 or 1926, either in March or November.

When his father lost his job, the family moved to Mumbai. Kazi, who got a job as a Bombay Electric Supply & Transport (BEST) bus conductor, took it upon himself to entertain his passengers with his comical way of calling out bus stops, funny impressions and tricks.

Throughout his youth, he dreamed of being involved in films, idolising Noor Mohammed Charlie and practicing stunts that he saw on-screen. He got a break in the film industry after actor Balraj Sahni introduced him to actor and director Guru Dutt after being amused by Kazi's antics.

== Career ==
Johnny Walker nurtured his desire to work in films and entertained passengers while working the BEST buses with amusing routines, hoping that he would at some point be spotted by someone with connection in a film. Balraj Sahni was either at that time writing the script for Baazi (1951), or acting in Hulchul, told Kazi to demonstrate his drunkard act to Guru Dutt. From that meeting, he gained a role in Baazi. It was Guru Dutt who gave him the name of Johnny Walker, a reference to the brand of Scotch whisky, when he was inspired by Kazi's display in the role of a drunkard.

Thereafter, Walker appeared in all but one of Dutt's movies and the director encouraged him to ad lib and to draw on his varied life experiences. He was primarily an actor of comedic roles but towards the end of his life became disenchanted, saying, "Earlier, comedians had a respectable position and an almost parallel role with the protagonist, now it is just to bring a touch of humour. I don't buy that." His attempts to portray heroic personae in the eponymous Johnny Walker and Mr. Qartoon M.A. were not successful but films such as Mere Mehboob, C.I.D., Pyaasa and Chori Chori made him a star. His heyday was in the 1950s and 1960s and his later career was affected by the death of Dutt, who had greatly influenced it, in 1964. He worked with directors such as Bimal Roy and Vijay Anand but his career faded in the 1980s. He was unwilling to adopt the cruder form of comedy and changed priorities that had become the vogue, saying that

"In those days we used to do clean comedy. We were aware that the person who had come to the cinema had come with his wife and children ... the story was the most important thing. Only after selecting a story would Abrar Alvi and Guru Dutt find suitable actors! Now it's all upside down ... they line up a big hero and find a story to fit in. The comedian has ceased to be a character, he's become something to fit in between scenes. ... I opted out because comedy had become hostage to vulgarity. I acted in 300 films and the Censor Board never cut even one line."

Johnny Walker was particularly satisfied with his work in B. R. Chopra's Naya Daur (1957), Chetan Anand's Taxi Driver (1954) and Bimal Roy's Madhumati (1958). His final film came after an absence of 14 years when he took a role in a remake of Mrs. Doubtfire titled Chachi 420 (1997). During the intervening period, he had a successful business dealing with precious and semi-precious stones.

Some songs were written especially for him. His drawing power at the box office was such that distributors would insist on him having a song and would pay extra to ensure it. He is the second actor (the first being the actress Madhubala with an eponymous 1950 film) to have one or more Hindi films in his name, but the only one with two (the 1957 film Johnny Walker and the 1992 Malayalam film Johnnie Walker). He was the first actor to keep a secretary/manager. He was the first actor to stop working on Sundays. He was the first actor to bring colloquialism to cinema through the film Taxi Driver. He also produced and directed the 1985 film Pahunche Huwey Log.

== Personal life ==
Johnny Walker married Noorjahan, sister of Indian actress Shakila, despite opposition from her family. They had three daughters and three sons. Regretting that he had been forced to leave school during 6th class, he sent his sons to the USA for schooling.

Despite often playing the roles of a drunkard and thief, Johnny Walker was a teetotaller and claimed to have never drunk alcohol in his life.

== Death ==
Johnny Walker died on 29 July 2003 after a long period of illness.

== Legacy ==
Johnny Walker is regarded as one of the greatest comedians in Indian Cinema. Many actors like Mehmood Ali, Johnny Lever and Govinda were influenced by his style of comedy. Actor Rajpal Yadav sees him as his inspiration and said, "He is such an actor in our lives that if we consider a century of actors, then Johnny Walker sahab is one of the greats."

The Hindu wrote, "He was known for his honesty, commitment and punctuality on sets". He was very fond of poetry too. He could recall hundreds of 'ashaars' to suit all occasions. A thorough gentleman, he would keep everyone in good humor through his jokes." In 2022, Walker was placed in Outlook India's "75 Best Bollywood Actors" list.

== Awards ==
- Filmfare Best Supporting Actor Award for his role in Madhumati
- Filmfare Best Comedian Award for his role in Shikar

== Filmography ==
Johnny Walker acted in around 300 films.

=== 1950–1959 ===
Year	Title	Role	Notes
1950s
1951	Baazi		Debut film
1952	Jaal	Tony Fernandes' associate	
1952	Aandhiyan	Mastram	
1953	Baaz	Court Astrologer	
1953	Aag Ka Dariya		
1953	Humsafar		
1953	Thokar		
1954	Lal Pari		
1954	Barati		
1954	Shaheed-e-Azad Bhagat Singh		
1954	Munna		
1954	Aar Paar	Rustom	
1954	Taxi Driver	Mastana	
1955	Bahu		
1955	Chhora Chhori		
1955	Marine Drive	Johnny	
1955	Char Paise	Dasu	
1955	Albeli		
1955	Devdas	One of Chandramukhi's patrons	
1955	Jashan		
1955	Jawab	Chandu	
1955	Joru Ka Bhai		
1955	Mr. & Mrs. '55	Johnny	
1955	Milap	Kalu	
1955	Mast Qalandar		
1955	Miss Coca Cola		
1955	Musafir Khana		
1955	Shahi Mehmaan		
1955	Railway Platform	Naseeb Chand	
1955	Shahzada		
1955	Society		
1956	Awara Shehzadi		
1956	Bharti		
1956	Anjaan - Somewhere in Delhi	Badri	
1956	C.I.D.	Master	
1956	Chhoo Mantar	Baijunath "Baiju"	
1956	Chori Chori	An aspiring Urdu poet	
1956	Chandrakanta		
1956	Ghulam Begum Badshah		
1956	Insaaf Justice		
1956	Naya Andaz	Karim	
1956	Shrimati 420		
1956	26 January		
1956	Samundari Daku		
1956	Rajdhani	Bahadur Singh	
1957	Changez Khan	Tez Khan	
1957	Do Roti	Anokhelal	
1957	Johnny Walker	Manohar	
1957	Pyaasa	Abdul Sattar	
1957	Mr. X		
1957	Naya Daur	Journalist	
1957	Duniya Rang Rangeeli	Manohar	
1957	Mai Baap	Parker	
1957	Gateway of India	Johnny Walker	
1957	Ek Saal	J. B. Pinto	
1957	Qaidi	A tramp	
1958	Sitaron Se Aage	Lattu	
1958	Naya Paisa		
1958	Mujrim	Pyarelal	
1958	Mr. Cartoon M. A.		
1958	Madhumati	Charandas	
1958	Light House		
1958	Zindagi ya Toofan	One of the two musicians-cum-servants-cum-general dogsbodies	
1958	Khota Paisa	Moti	
1958	Ghar Sansar	Banke	
1958	Do Mastane		
1958	Chandan		
1958	Detective	John Butler	
1958	Aji Bas Shukriya		
1958	Aakhri Dao	Popat	
1958	Amar Deep	Ustad	
1958	12 O'Clock	Motilal Sharma "Moti"	
1959	Bhai Bahen	Johnny	
1959	Pehli Raat		
1959	Satta Bazaar		
1959	Jawani Ki Hawa	Dhakosla	
1959	Kaagaz Ke Phool	Rakesh Verma "Rocky"	
1959	Paigham	Nandu	
1959	Mr. John		
1959	Zara Bachke	Bhola	
1959	Black Cat		

=== 1960–1969 ===
Year	Title	Role	Notes
1960s
1960	Chaudhvin Ka Chand	Mirza Musarraddique Shaida	
1960	Ghar Ki Laaj		
1960	Kaala Aadmi		
1960	Ek Phool Char Kante	Uncle no. 2, a rock-n-roll fanatic	
1960	Mughal-E-Azam	A tawaif	
1960	Rickshawala		
1960	Basant	Billoo	
1961	Chhote Nawab	Captain	
1961	Walayat Pass		
1961	Modern Girl		
1961	Suhag Sindoor		
1961	Wanted		
1962	Girls Hostel		
1962	Neeli Aankhen		
1962	Sachche Moti		
1962	Baat Ek Raat Ki	Chunnilal Ishwarlal Dholakia "C.I.D."	
1963	Ghar Basake Dekho	Jaikishan Ram Agnihotri "Jackson"	
1963	Kahin Pyaar Na Ho Jaaye		
1963	Kaun Apna Kaun Paraya		
1963	Mere Mehboob	Bindadeen Rastogi	
1963	Mulzim		
1963	Phool Bane Angaare	Mohan	
1963	Pyar ka Bandhan		
1963	Ustadon Ke Ustad	Babu	
1964	Door Ki Awaz	Motilal Rai "Moti"	
1964	Shehnai	Jan Mohammed	
1965	Bombay Race Course		
1965	Zindagi Aur Maut		
1966	Baharen Phir Bhi Aayengi	Chunnilal	
1966	Dil Diya Dard Liya	Murlidhar	
1966	Preet Na Jane Reet	Fernandes	
1966	Dillagi	Pyarelal alias Professor B. N. R. Chaubey	
1966	Insaaf		
1966	Pati Patni		
1966	Suraj	Bhola	
1967	Jaal	Prakash	
1967	Bahu Begum	Achchan	
1967	Milan Ki Raat		
1967	Dulhan Ek Raat Ki	Bansi	
1967	Nawab Sirazuddaula		
1967	Night in London	Bahadur Singh	
1967	Noor Jehan	A servitor	
1967	Palki	Sultan	
1967	Taqdeer	Johnny	
1967	Rajoo		
1967	Wahan ke Log	Johnny	
1967	Shrimant Mehuna Pahije		Marathi
1968	Baazi	Joe	
1968	Dil Aur Mohabbat	Sampat	
1968	Kahin Din Kahin Raat		
1968	Duniya	James Bond	
1968	Haseena Maan Jayegi	Ghasitaram Aashiq	
1968	Mere Huzoor	Pyarelal	
1968	Shikar	Tej Bahadur "Teju"	
1969	Aadmi Aur Insaan	Ghulam Rasool	
1969	Pyar Ka Sapna	Gupte	
1969	Nannha Farishta		
1969	Sachaai	Chaman	
1969	Wilait Pass	Ajit	Punjabi Movie

=== 1970–1979 ===
Year	Title	Role	Notes
1970s
1970	Gopi	Ramu	
1971	Anand	Issabhai Suratwala	
1971	Hungama	Naseeb Chand alias Chhote	
1971	Memsaab	Ramkhilavan	
1971	Sanjog	Mansukh	
1971	Dushman	Palmist	Special Appearance
1972	Ek Bechara	Gullu	
1972	Ek Hasina Do Diwane	Brahmachari	
1972	Raja Jani	Imartilal	
1972	Ye Gulistan Hamara	Tuna's boyfriend	
1973	Pyaar Ka Rishta	Lachho	
1974	Aarop	Dhondu Dada	
1974	Badla	Johny Ferbanda	
1974	Imaan	Amirchand	
1974	Dawat		
1974	Jurm Aur Sazaa	Arif	
1974	Madhosh	Gor	
1974	Dukh Bhanjan Tera Naam	Hakim	Punjabi Film
1975	Dhoti Lota Aur Chowpatty		
1975	Kaagaz Ki Nao		
1975	Sewak		
1975	Vandana	John	
1975	Pratiggya	Birju Thekedaar	
1975	Zakhmee	Johnny	
1975	Teri Meri Ek Jindri	Sadhu	Punjabi Film
1976	Bundalbaaz	Suleiman	
1976	Santan		
1976	Udanchoo		
1977	Farishta Ya Qatil		
1977	Khel Khilari Ka	Khairatilal	
1977	Mera Vachan Geeta Ki Qasam		
1978	Nawab Sahib	Hameed	
1978	Miya Fuski 007		Gujarati Film

=== 1980–2000 ===
Year	Title	Role	Notes
1980s
1980	Shaan	Renu's Uncle	
1980	Jaayen To Jaayen Kahan		
1981	Madine ki Galiyan		
1983	Mazdoor	Govinda	
1983	Rishta Kagaz Ka	Hanibhai	
1984	Bindiya Chamkegi	Rahim	
1984	Meraa Dost Meraa Dushman	Mulayam Singh	
1985	Hum Dono	Michael	
1987	Mera Karam Mera Dharam	Taraknath	
1988	Sagar Sangam	Inspector Shamsher Singh	
1988	The Perfect Murder	Jain	English Film
1990s
1991	Sapnon Ka Mandir		
1997	Chachi 420	Joseph	Final film appearance
