= Geeta Dutt =

Indian singer (1930–1972)

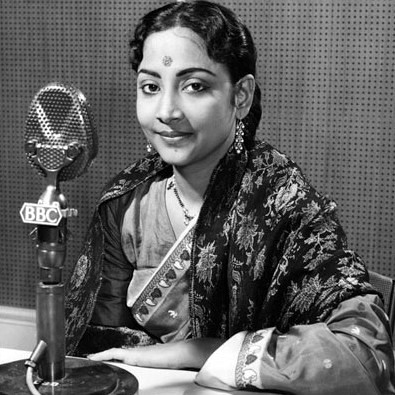
- Dutt, taken before 1958
- Born: Geeta Ghosh Roy Chowdhuri; 23 November 1930; Idilpur, Bengal Presidency, British India (present-day Dhaka Division, Bangladesh)
- Died: 20 July 1972 (aged 41); Bombay, Maharashtra, India
- Occupation: Singer
- Years active: 1946–1972
- Spouse: Guru Dutt (m. 1953; died 1964)
- Musical career
- Genres: Filmi; Classical; Devotional; Bengali music
- Instruments: Vocals

Geeta Dutt (Bengali pronunciation: [ɡita dɔtːo]; born Geeta Ghosh Roy Chowdhuri; 23 November 1930 – 20 July 1972) was an Indian classical and playback singer. She found particular prominence as a playback singer in Hindi cinema and Bengali cinema and is considered as one of the best playback singers of all time in Hindi films. She also sang many modern Bengali songs in the non-film genre.

== Early life ==
Geeta Ghosh Roy Chowdhuri was one of ten children born to a wealthy zamindar family in Idilpur village, Madaripur subdivision, Faridpur district, Bengal Presidency, British Raj. This area is now part of the Gosairhat upazila in the Shariatpur district of Bangladesh. In the early 1940s, her family moved to Calcutta and Assam, leaving their land and properties behind. In 1942, her parents moved to a flat in Bombay. Geeta was twelve years old at the time and continued her schooling at Bengali High School.

== Early career ==
She trained as a singer under her music teacher, Hirendranath Nandy, as a child, before her family left East Bengal in 1942 and settled in Bombay. In 1946, composer K. Hanuman Prasad launched her film career when she landed her first role in the mythological film Bhakta Prahlad, aged sixteen. She was given two lines to sing in two songs.

She rose to fame as a playback singer after appearing in the 1947 film Do Bhai, for which she recorded the popular song 'Mera Sundar Sapna Beet Gaya', composed by S. D. Burman. Within two years, she had worked on 15 films. By 1949, she had established herself as one of the era's leading playback singers, with hit songs in films such as Shaheed, Ek Thi Larki, Darogaji, Shabnam and Jeet.

Both Darogaji (1949) and Jogan (1950) featured 12 or more songs performed by Dutt and composed by Bulo C. Rani. Between 1947 and 1964, Dutt and Rani collaborated on 60 songs.

In 1951, her performances of the songs from the Hindi film Baazi, for which S. D. Burman composed the music, were very well received. In particular, the song 'Tadbeer se bigdi hui taqdeer bana le' became a favourite. She met and fell in love with the film's director, Guru Dutt, while recording this song. In the 1950s, she became one of the Hindi film industry's highest-paid and most in-demand singers, performing in around twelve films in 1948 and at least twenty-five the following year.

Despite not knowing the language, it was her performances in Gujarati films that brought her early success. She recorded songs for four films — Gunsundari, Kariyavar, Nanand Bhojai and Varasdar — all of which were released in 1948. She collaborated with composers Avinash Vyas and Ajit Merchant on these projects. In 1950, she recorded six more songs for films, as well as two for the six Gujarati films released the following year. She worked with Avinash Vyas again on five songs for Naagdevta (1955) and with her composer brother Mukul Roy on four songs for Vidhata (1956). Between 1948 and 1967, she recorded almost 80 songs for 25 Gujarati films.

== Works in Bengali ==
Geeta Dutt produced a significant body of work in her mother tongue, Bengali. She recorded two songs for the 1956 film Mahakobi Girishchandra, which were composed by Anil Bagchi. She collaborated several times with Nachiketa Ghosh, creating popular songs for films such as Prithibi Aamaare Chaay (1957) and Indrani (1958).

Dutt also frequently collaborated with Hemanta Mukherjee on eleven films, including Joutuk (1958), Sonar Harin (1959), Modhyoraater Taara (1961), and Sathi Hara (1961). Notably, she sang the song 'Shudhu Ektukhani Chaowa' with Kishore Kumar for the 1958 film Lukochuri, for which Mukherjee composed the score and Gauriprasanna Mazumdar wrote the lyrics.

Outside of Bengali film music, she worked with Kanu Ghosh, Sudhin Dasgupta, and Salil Chowdhury on devotional and folk music, as well as other genres of the Bengali music.

== Marriage with Guru Dutt ==
After meeting on the set of Baazi, Roy frequently visited Dutt and his family at their home in Matunga. As she was the sole earner in her family, her relatives were reluctant for her to marry Dutt, who was neither well-established nor Bengali, unlike the Roys. However, with the support of Dutt's family, the couple became engaged. Nearly three years later, on 26 May 1953, they were married at Roy's mother's home in Santa Cruz. Following the wedding, she adopted Guru Dutt's surname.

Their contrasting personalities and busy work schedules put a strain on their marriage. Guru Dutt was dedicated to his work and was having an affair with his co-star, Waheeda Rehman. Occasionally, the couple lived separately, with Guru Dutt staying at his mother's house and spending most of his time at work.

In an apparent attempt to repair their relationship, Guru Dutt started working on a film called Gouri, which was based on the 1943 Hindi film of the same name. He cast his wife in her first leading role. Filming began in Calcutta in 1957, with scenes to be shot in both Bengali and English. However, filming was suspended after just a few days for unclear reasons, resulting in the film being shelved and causing financial losses for Guru Dutt's production company. According to the film's scriptwriter, Nabendu Ghosh, and another writer, Bimal Mitra, Guru Dutt called off filming the following day after a heated argument on set. The crew then left Calcutta within two days.

In 1963, soon after demolishing their house on Pali Hill, Dutt moved to live separately with her three children in Bandra while Guru Dutt lived alone in a flat on Peddar Road.

== Later career ==
After they married, she sang in all of Guru Dutt's subsequent films, receiving widespread acclaim for her performances in Mr and Mrs '55, C.I.D., Pyaasa, Kaagaz Ke Phool and Sahib Bibi Aur Ghulam. She also regularly appeared in films starring Dutt's close associates, including Dev Anand in Nau Do Gyarah, Kala Bazar, and Ek Ke Baad Ek.

In 1956, Dutt was forced to declare personal bankruptcy following the financial failure of Sailaab, a film produced by her brother Mukul Roy.

Despite her consistent work in her husband's productions, her career declined in the late 1950s amid rumours of a troubled personal life, missed rehearsals, and alcohol abuse. Her regular collaborators including S.D. Burman and O. P. Nayyar drifted towards hiring, the more popular, Lata Mangeshkar and Asha Bhonsle.

Following Guru Dutt's death in 1964, her mental health issues worsened and she appeared in fewer films. However, she played the lead role in the 1967 Bengali film Badhu Baran, in which she starred alongside Pradeep Kumar. This was also the last Bengali film in which she sang. In 1971, she recorded three well-received songs for Basu Bhattacharya's film Anubhav, for which Kanu Roy composed the music. These songs have since become popular.

She made her final performance in the unreleased 1972 film Midnight, in which she sang two duets, one of which was with Talat Mahmood.

== Legacy ==
With over 25 years of performing experience, Geeta Dutt has recorded more than 1,400 songs in various Indian languages, including Bengali, Gujarati, Marathi, Maithili, Bhojpuri, Punjabi, Nepali and Hindi.

Of her singing, popular music critic Raju Bharatan remarked, "Of all her contemporaries her musical training was perhaps the sketchiest but what she lacked in training and technique, she more than made up with her ability to breathe life and emotion into any song she was singing."

Comparing her with the then-newcomer Asha Bhonsle, frequent collaborator and composer O. P. Nayyar said "As a singer, she [Asha Bhosle] sang all my songs with her heart and soul. However, Geeta Dutt’s voice modulation was far far better. It remains one of my greatest regrets that I phased out Geeta due to my emotional involvement with Asha, when it was Geeta who had introduced me to Guru Dutt. That’s when my career really took off."

Of her collaboration with S. D. Burman and them finding success together, Burman's son composer R. D. Burman said "Geeta Dutt was my father’s favourite and there was a family feeling between us. Geeta’s first hit song, Mera sundar sapna beet gaya...was composed by my father whom she called chacha (uncle). Geeta was very famous in her time; she could sing any type of song: soft songs, cabaret songs, aggressive and romantic songs...My father’s music was not recognized immediately...Then came Baazi, a big hit."

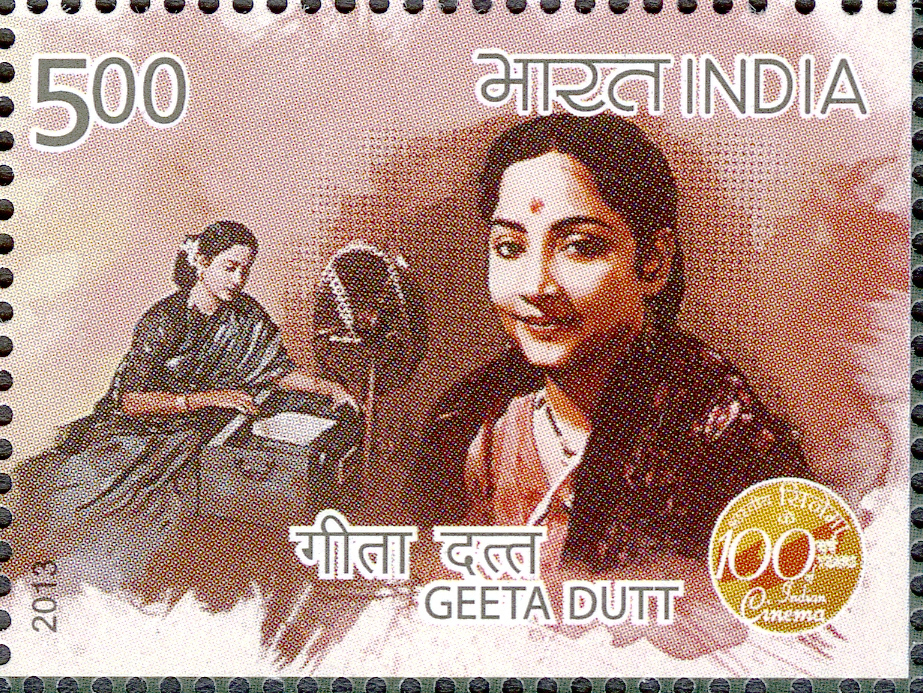
2013 stamp of India featuring Dutt

Postage stamps featuring Dutt were issued by India Post in 2013 and 2016.

== Personal life ==
With Guru Dutt, Geeta Dutt had two sons, Tarun (1954-1985), Arun (1956-2014) and a daughter, Nina (b. 1962).

She died on 20 July 1972 due to liver cirrhosis aged 41, in Mumbai, Maharashtra.

== Notable songs ==
Some of the songs sung under S. D. Burman's direction:

- "Mera Sundar Sapna Beet Gaya" (Do Bhai – 1947)
- "Woh Sapne Waali Raat" (Pyaar – 1950)
- "Tadbir Se Bigdi Hui Taqdeer" (Baazi – 1951)
- "Aan Milo Aan Milo" (Devdas – 1955) With Manna Dey
- "Aaj Sajan Mohe Ang Lagalo" (Pyaasa – 1957)
- " Jane kya tune kahi" (Pyaasa – 1957)
- "Hum Aap Ke Aankhon Main" (Pyaasa – 1957) with Mohd. Rafi
- "Hawa Dhire Aana" (Sujata – 1959)
- "Waqt Ne Kiya Kya Haseen Sitam" (Kaagaz Ke Phool – 1959)
- "Janu janu re" (Insaan Jaag Utha) with Asha Bhosle

Some of the songs she sang under O. P. Nayyar's direction:

- "Zara Saamne Aa" (Baaz – 1953)
- "Babuji Dhire Chalna" (Aar Paar – 1954)
- "Thandi Hawa Kali Ghata" (Mr. & Mrs. '55 – 1955)
- "Jaane Kahan Mera Jigar Gaya Ji" (Mr. & Mrs. '55 – 1955)
- "Jab Badal Lehraya" (Chhoomantar – 1956)
- "Mere Zindagi Ke Humsafar" (Shrimati 420 – 1956)
- "Jaata Kahan Hai" (CID – 1956)
- "Aye Dil Hain Mushkil" (Aka "Bombay Meri Jaan") (CID – 1956), With Mohammed Rafi
- "Chor, Lutere, Daku" (Ustad – 1957)
- "Mera Naam Chin Chin Chu" (Howrah Bridge – 1958)
- "Kaisa Jadoo Balam Tune Dara" (12 O'clock – 1958)

Some of the songs sung under Hemant Kumar's direction

- "Jai Jagadish Hare" Composed By A Sanskrit Poet Jayadeva Circa 1200 AD (Anand Math - 1951)
- "Na Jao Saiyaan Chhuda Ke Baiyaan" (Sahib Bibi Aur Ghulam – 1962)
- "Kaise Roko Ge Aise Toofan Ko" (Anandmath – 1952 ) With Talat Mahmood
- "Madbhari Hain Pyar Ki Palken" (Fashion – 1957)
- "Na Yeh Chand Ho Ga" (Shart – 1954)
- "Piya Aiso Jiya Mein Samaye Gayo" (Sahib Bibi Aur Ghulam – 1962)
- "Chale Aao Chale Aao" (Sahib Bibi Aur Ghulam – 1962)

Madan Mohan's direction

- "Aye Dil Mujhe Bata De'"(Bhai Bhai – 1956)

For movie Anubhav (1971)

- "Mujhe Jaan Nah Kaho Meri Jaan" (Anubhav – 1971) Music: Kanu Roy
- "Mera Dil Jo Mera Hota" (Anubhav – 1971) Music: Kanu Roy
- "Koi Chupke Se Aake" (Anubhav – 1971) Music: Kanu Roy

Several songs from Jogan:

- "Ghunghat Ke Pat Khol"
- "Mein Tou Girdhar Ke Ghar Jaon"
- "Mat Ja Mat Ja Jogi"
- "Dag Mag Dag Mag Dole Naiya"
- "Mein Tou Prem Diwani"

Some Bengali songs:

- 'Shachimata Go Char Juge Hai' (1950)
- Baalo (1951) ( Punjabi Film ) : Kothe Kothe Aa Kudiye : Music N Dutta : L Sahir Ludhiyanvi
- 'Ekhan-O Dustar Lajja' (1952)
- 'Ei Sundar Swarnali Sandhyay' (Hospital, 1960; Music: Amal Mukherjee)
- 'Katha Achhe Tumi Aj Asbe (Kanu Ghosh 1960)
- 'Ei Mayabi Tithi' (Shonar Horin, 1959; Music: Hemant Mukherjee)
- 'Tumi Je Amar' (Harano Sur, 1958; Music: Hemant Kumar)
- 'Nishi Raat Banka Chand Aakashe' (Prithibi Aamare Chaay, 1957; Music: Nachiketa Ghosh)
- 'Jhanak Jhanak Kanak Kankan Baaje' (Indrani, 1958; Music : Nachiketa Ghosh)
- ' Sundar, jano na ki.....' ( Indrani, 1958; Music : Nachiketa Ghosh)
- ' Nir chhoto kshati nei ' [duet with Hemanta Mukherjee]( Indrani, 1958; Music : Nachiketa Ghosh)
- ' Kancher churir chhata' ( Dak Harkara; Music : Sudhin Dasgupta)

A few Bengali songs of non-film genre:

- ' Kato gaan haralam tomar majhe ' (Music : Anal Chatterjee)
- ' Krishnachura aagun tumi ' (Music : Sudhin Dasgupta)
- ' Ektu chaoya, ektu paoya ' (Music : Sudhin Dasgupta)
- '..Aay aay moynamotir ganye ' (Music : Kanu Roy)
