= Ram Avtar =

Indian actor

Ram Avtar (born 1911) was a character actor turned comedian in Hindi cinema. He is best known for his roles in Nasir Hussain's films, especially Teesri Manzil (1967) and Yaadon Ki Baaraat (1973). These roles ranged from tickled train passenger in the former to the hero's sidekick in Jab Pyar Kisi Se Hota Hai (1961) and Tumsa Nahin Dekha (1957). He was known for his big belly and mirthful demeanor.

Avtar was born in 1911 in Rawalpindi. He began his career in the late-1930s and early 1940s, as a character actor. Over the 1950s he transitioned into a comedian as he began to put on more weight. Avtar's last film credit was in 1981.

== Filmography ==
Year	Title	Role
1949	Lahore	Ashok's Friend
1949	Paras	
1949	Bari Behen	Seth Amrit Lal
1950	Madhubala	
1950	Chhai	Punjabi Punjabi Movie
1951	Nazneen	
1953	Rail Ka Dibba	
1954	Nagin	
1954	Gul Bahar	
1954	Chor Bazar	
1954	Chakradhari	
1955	Char Paise	Suspect
1956	Some Where in Delhi	Doctor
1956	Ham Sab Chor Hain	Dayaram
1956	Heer	Ranjha's Brother
1957	Tumsa Nahin Dekha	Johny
1957	Samundar	
1959	Chand Ki Duniya	
1961	Jab Pyar Kisi Se Hota Hai	
1962	Anpadh	
1963	Godaan	
1963	Phir Wohi Dil Laya Hoon	Kamala
1964	Leader	
1964	April Fool	Hotel Manager
1964	Majboor	Lala
1965	Ek Sapera Ek Lutera	
1965	Guide	Pandit
1966	Teesri Manzil	Laughing Passenger
1966	Phool Aur Patthar	Fat Pickpocket
1966	Husn Aur Ishq	
1967	Latt Saheb	Mukadam Paras Ram
1967	Baharon Ke Sapne	
1968	Sadhu Aur Shaitaan	Pandit Chaturvedi
1968	Jhuk Gaya Aasman	Motumal
1969	Pyar Ka Mausam	
1969	Aradhana	
1969	Aadmi Aur Insaan	Sweets shop Owner (Uncredited)
1970	Samaj Ko Badal Dalo	
1970	Pagla Kahin Ka	Gangu Teli
1970	Mastana	Theatre Owner
1971	Patanga	
1971	Hungama	Hotel Manager
1972	Ek Hasina Do Diwane	
1972	Dil Daulat Duniya	Hari
1973	Yaadon Ki Baaraat	Subodh Mukherjee
1973	Kahani Kismat Ki	Ramu
1973	Loafer	Pan Seller
1974	Amir Garib	Stranger
1974	Dukh Bhanjan Tera Naam	mantri
1974	5 Rifles	Constable (fatso)
1975	Do Jasoos	Mr Thompson
1976	Fakira	
1976	Laila Majnu	
1980	Thodisi Bewafaii	Mr. Ram Avtaar
1981	Prem Geet	Patient
1986	Love and God	
