= Baharon Ke Sapne =

1967 film by Nasir Hussain

- Poster
- Directed by: Nasir Hussain
- Produced by: Nasir Hussain
- Starring: Asha Parekh; Rajesh Khanna; Premnath
- Cinematography: Jal Mistry
- Edited by: Babu Lavande, Gurudutt Shirali
- Music by: R.D. Burman
- Release date: 23 June 1967
- Country: India
- Language: Hindi

Baharon Ke Sapne (Dreams of Spring) is a 1967 Hindi film made under Nasir Hussain films' banner. It stars Asha Parekh and Rajesh Khanna in the lead roles. It also featured Premnath, Madan Puri and Rajendra Nath. Majrooh Sultanpuri wrote the lyrics and the music was composed by R.D. Burman. It is mostly a black-and-white film, except for one dream sequence: the song "Kya Janoo Sajan" was shot in color. In Baharon Ke Sapne, the response from the public in the first week of run forced the film's ending to be changed from a tragic one to happier one from the second week.

== Synopsis ==
In a small industrial town near Bombay lives Bholanath, who works at the local mill, and is the proud husband of Gauri, a daughter, Champa, and above all his son, Ramaiya, who is a graduate in the arts faculty—the only one in this town who has attained this degree. But times are hard, and jobs are difficult to come by. When Bholanath loses his job, Ramaiya decides to find employment, and does so as a menial worker in the same mill his dad used to work. Ramaiya is very popular with his co-workers and they soon elect him as their new union leader. This puts Ramaiya in conflict with the Management of the Mill, headed by the owner, Kapoor, who has ordered that Ramaiya be eliminated post haste. But Ramaiya is determined to address the workers' grievances, and he gets himself framed for theft; he has the police on the lookout for him, and so Ramaiya goes into hiding. When Ramaiya does not show up for a workers' meeting, some believe that he has been bought by the mill management, and they decide to take matters into their own hands—by burning the mill down, killing Kapoor and his family, and getting into direct confrontation with the local police, who have been issued orders to shoot-at-sight. The original end, where Ramaiya was supposed to die along with Geeta, taking a bullet from the leader of the agitation, but the response from the viewers forced the ending to be a happier one. In the end, both survive and the mill restarts.

== Cast ==
- Asha Parekh as Geeta
- Rajesh Khanna as Ramaiya
- Prem Nath as Mr. Kapoor
- Rajendra Nath as Pandu
- Madan Puri as Ranjeet
- Sulochana Latkar as Gouri
- Nana Palsikar as Bholanath
- P. Jairaj
- Anwar Hussain
- Ram Avtar
- Bela Bose as Guest Dancer
- Laxmi Chhaya as Guest Dancer

== Production ==
The film Teesri Manzil (1966) was originally supposed to be directed by Nasir Hussain and was to star Dev Anand in the lead. Baharon Ke Sapne was to be directed by Vijay Anand. However, on the occasion of Sadhana's engagement party, a misunderstanding erupted between Dev Anand and Nasir Hussain, when apparently, Nasir overheard Dev Anand saying "The film which Nasir is making with me is coloured and he has given Goldie some black-and-white film to make. Goldie is making the movie with some new boy, Rajesh Khanna". It was the next day that Nasir requested Vijay Anand to direct Teesri Manzil and offered to helm Baharon Ke Sapne, but specified that Teesri Manzil would not have Dev Anand in it. It was only then that Shammi Kapoor was approached.

Initially, Nanda was approached to play the female lead in the film. However, she declined the offer, as the role was not glamorous and therefore went against her modern image at the time. Thereafter, Nasir Hussain's frequent collaborator Asha Parekh was signed.

Parekh has revealed that during the shooting of the film, Khanna was introverted and had an inferiority complex as she was a far bigger star than he was. It was only after Aradhana (1969) was released two years later and Khanna became a superstar, that this tension was resolved in their subsequent films together.

== Soundtrack ==
Baharon Ke Sapne

Soundtrack album by R.D. Burman
- Released: January 1, 1967
- Genre: Feature film soundtrack
- Length: 34:13
- Label: Saregama India
- Producer: R.D. Burman

R.D. Burman chronology
Chandan Ka Palna (1967)	Baharon Ke Sapne (1967)	Padosan (1968)

All lyrics are written by Majrooh Sultanpuri; all music is composed by R.D. Burman.

Songs
No.	Title	Singer(s)	Length
1.	"Baharon Ke Sapne Theme (Instrumental)"	R.D. Burman	1:43
2.	"Do Pal Jo Teri Ankhon Se"	Asha Bhosle & Usha Mangeshkar	4:25
3.	"Aaja Piya Tohe Pyar Doon"	Lata Mangeshkar	4:11
4.	"Kya Janu Sajan"	Lata Mangeshkar	5:32
5.	"Chunri Sambhal Gori"	Lata Mangeshkar & Manna Dey	6:34
6.	"Zamane Ne Mare Jawan"	Mohammed Rafi	4:13
7.	"O Mere Sajna O Mere Balma"	Lata Mangeshkar	4:17
8.	"Zamane Ne Mare Jawan"	Mohammed Rafi	3:14
Total length:			34:10

== Awards ==
Filmfare Best Cinematographer Award—Black & White Film--Jal Mistry
