= Ham Sab Chor Hain (1956 film) =

1956 Indian Hindi-language film

- Starring: Shammi Kapoor; Pran; Nalini Jaywant; Ameeta
- Release date: 1956
- Country: India
- Language: Hindi

Ham Sab Chor Hain is a 1956 Indian Hindi-language film directed by I. S. Johar and produced under the banner of Filmistan. Its music was composed by O. P. Nayyar. One of the earliest films starring Shammi Kapoor, it performed well at the box office but failed to advance Kapoor's career. The film was described in a Times of India review as a "joyous feast of fun, comedy, satire and delightful music".

== Cast ==
- Shammi Kapoor
- Pran
- Nalini Jaywant
- I. S. Johar
- Majnu
- Ameeta
- Badri Prasad
- Ram Avtar
- Ramesh Sinha
- Rajendra Nath
- Shakuntala
- Mumtaz Begum
