= Rajendra Nath =

Indian actor (1931–2008)

- Born: 8 June 1931; Tikamgarh, Orchha State, British India (present-day Madhya Pradesh, India)
- Died: 13 February 2008 (aged 76); Mumbai, Maharashtra, India
- Occupation: Actor
- Years active: 1938–1998
- Known for: Comedy
- Relatives: Prem Nath (brother); Narendra Nath (brother); Raj Kapoor (brother-in-law); Prem Chopra (brother-in-law)

Rajendra Nath Malhotra (8 June 1931 − 13 February 2008) credited a Rajendra Nath was an Indian actor and comedian in Hindi and Punjabi films.

== Early life and family ==
Rajendra Nath was born on 8 June 1931 in Tikamgarh, which is now in Madhya Pradesh. His family was from the Karimpura locality of Peshawar but settled in Jabalpur in Madhya Pradesh. His father Rai Bahadur Kartar Nath Malhotra was a police officer of high cadre during British Raj whose frequent transfers led to his service tenure across different Indian states. Rajendra Nath studied at Darbar College, Rewa, where Arjun Singh (a Congress politician) and R.P. Agarwal were his classmates.

Rajendra's elder brother Prem Nath went to Mumbai to became an actor and Rajendra joined him in 1949 upon completing his schooling and on being called upon by Prem Nath who already had started working in films by then. They were good friends of Raj Kapoor and Shashi Kapoor. Rajendra and Prem's sister Krishna married actor-director Raj Kapoor. He had also another brother Narendra Nath who also became an actor who usually played some villain's role in the movies. While Bina Rai became his sister-in-law after her marriage to Prem Nath in 1952, Prem Chopra became his brother-in-law after his marriage to his younger sister Uma in 1969. Also Rajendra Nath became particularly close to Shammi Kapoor when they used to go for horse-riding at Rewa after Krishna Malhotra married Raj Kapoor in 1946 and used to stay at her father's home for some point of time. The duo later did several films together.

Rajendra, who was little interested in studies, quit college and landed in Bombay to work in films like his brother. He did some plays at Prithvi theatre namely Deewar, Pathan, Shakuntala and Ahuti and worked there for ten years during which he befriended Shammi Kapoor, Shashi Kapoor and even Shankar-Jaikishan duo who all were yet to make their mark in Hindi Cinema.

== Career ==
Apart from acting on plays, Rajendra Nath occasionally did brief roles in films which were insignificant to the extent that no one would notice his screen presence as such. Besides, he used to live a somewhat carefree life, least bothered about his career. It was only when an annoyed Prem Nath ousted him from home that he started thinking of his career deeply. However, Prem Nath did give Rajendra Nath another house to live (which he used to share with Yash Johar who later became a successful film producer) besides giving him significant roles in films Shagufa in 1953 and Golconda Ka Qaidi in 1954 in which he was the side hero. Both these films were produced by Prem Nath himself under his production banner P. N. Films which starred himself opposite his wife Bina Rai. However, these films flopped. The latter one was also directed by Prem Nath himself; it was also dubbed in English under the title Prisoner of Golconda completed in 1954 but remained unreleased until Prem Nath's younger son Kailash "Monty" Nath released the English version in YouTube in his channel Major Mood Entertainment excluding the songs (which will be in Hindi). Rajendra Nath got recognition in a small comic role in the film Hum Sab Chor Hain in 1956. This recognition was strengthened with his role in Shararat in 1959 and then the same year Sashadhar Mukherjee offered him a comedian's role in Dil Deke Dekho, a film directed by Nasir Hussain, starring Shammi Kapoor and Asha Parekh. Rajendra Nath along with Asha Parekh were a regular feature in many Nasir Hussain films like Phir Wohi Dil Laya Hoon, Jab Pyar Kisi Se Hota Hai, Baharon Ke Sapne and Pyar Ka Mausam. He also played a villainous role in Hamrahi opposite Shashikala whose character he kills. He was one of the most famous comedians. His best role as comedian was in Mere Sanam and Phir Wohi Dil Laya Hoon. He also played the role of Hero/Second Lead in Vachan and Teen Bahuraniyan. He played supporting roles in films like Dharkan by Devendra Goel and Jeevan Mrityu by Rajshri Productions. He played a buffoon called Popatlal in Jab Pyar Kisi Se Hota Hai, and since then the name became synonymous with Rajendra Nath. He used this name in the famous TV series Hum Paanch.

He then did many films, mostly in comic roles, such as in An Evening in Paris and Phir Wohi Dil Laya Hoon. One of his most lauded performances was in Manoj Kumar's Purab Aur Paschim though it was not a full-fledged comedy role. He also contributed to Nepal's first movie Maitighar which was shot in Kathmandu, Nepal. His career was badly affected following a car accident in 1969 as a result of which, he had to spend many months in hospital. Then in 1974, he started shooting for his home production The Gate Crasher starring Randhir Kapoor and Neetu Singh in main leads. However, his lack of experience in filmmaking led to him being betrayed by his associates and after falling in a huge debt owing to this, he had to stall the film after ten days of shoot.

He starred in a number of Punjabi films such as Jatt Punjabi and Do Posti. His last film was Laash.

As per the data provided by Surat (Gujarat) based senior film historian Harish Raghuvanshi, Rajendra Nath acted in 9 films of 1950s, 70 in 1960s, 67 in 1970s, 84 in 1980s and 23 in 1990s, thus in total 253 films in his entire acting career. Most of the information above was shared by Rajendra Nath himself to film historian Shishir Krishna Sharma of his column Kya Bhooloon Kya Yaad Karoon in the Hindi weekly paper Sahara Samay during the 2000s. He died on 13 February 2008 from cardiac arrest at the age of 76. He is survived by his wife, a son who used to work for Qatar Airlines and a daughter.

== Partial Filmography ==
Year	Title	Role	Notes
1953	Shagufa		One of his earliest roles, the first significant one
1954	Golconda Ka Qaidi (Hindi) alias Prisoner of Golconda (English)	Chandan	The English version remained unreleased until it was finally released on 16 January 2021 in YouTube by Prem Nath's son Kailash "Monty" Nath in his channel Major Mood Entertainment excluding the songs (which will be in Hindi)
1956	Hum Sab Chor Hain		
1959	Shararat		
1959	Dil Deke Dekho	Kailash	
1960	Usne Kaha Tha	Randheera	
1961	Jab Pyar Kisi Se Hota Hai	Popat Lal alias Charlie	
1962	Prem Patra	Kedar	
1962	Aarti	Jeevan	
1963	Tere Ghar Ke Samne	Captain Ranjit "Ronnie"	
1963	Hamrahi	Hanuman Sharma	Negative Role
1963	Mujhe Jeene Do	Dara Khan	
1963	Phir Wohi Dil Laya Hoon	Deepu	
1963	Yeh Rastey Hain Pyar Ke	Kewal Kapoor	
1964	Beti Bete	Shankar	
1964	Rajkumar	Kapil alias Jagatram	
1965	Mere Sanam	Pyarelal	
1965	Janwar	Chintu	
1966	Maitighar		Nepali film; Special Appearance
1966	Aaye Din Bahar Ke		
1967	Aamne Samne	Shubodh Mukherjee	
1967	Baharon Ke Sapne	Pandu	
1967	Parivar	Sitaram	
1967	An Evening in Paris	Makhan Singh	
1967	Chhoti Si Mulaqat	Sam Kapoor	
1967	Hare Kanch Ki Chooriyan	Jimmy	
1968	Teen Bahuraniyan	Kanhaiya	
1968	Jhuk Gaya Aasman	Hanuman Singh	
1969	Pyar Ka Mausam	Jhatpat Singh	
1969	Beti	Deepak	
1969	Raja Saab	Pratap Singh	
1969	Prince	Valiyatiram	
1969	Aya Sawan Jhoom Ke	Sadhuram Sood	
1970	Maharaja	Kishen	
1970	Jeevan Mrityu	Prem Prakash	
1970	Purab Aur Paschim	Shankar	
1970	Aan Milo Sajna	Manmauji	
1970	The Train	Pyarelal	
1970	Tum Haseen Main Jawaan	Romeo	
1971	Hare Rama Hare Krishna	Toofan	
1971	Mela	Bansilal	
1971	Aap Aye Bahar Ayee	Whisky	
1971	Maryada		
1971	Main Sunder Hoon	Director	
1972	Dharkan	Inspector Darshan K. Lal	
1972	Ek Bar Mooskura Do		
1973	Kahani Kismat Ki	Gopuchand	
1974	Hamrahi	Hanuman Sharma	
1974	Patthar Aur Payal	Shankar Dayak	
1975	Julie	Rahim	
1976	Chhoti Si Baat	Mauni Baba	
1976	Chadi Jawani Budhe Nu	Policeman	Punjabi Film
1978	Giddha		Punjabi Film
1979	Badmashon Ka Badmaash		
1979	Dada	Alibhai Motorwala	
1980	The Burning Train	Shambhunath	
1980	Guest House	Bawara	
1981	Hotel	Popatlal	
1981	Mangalsutra	Munim	
1981	Biwi-O-Biwi	Veer Singh	
1982	Taaqat		
1982	Prem Rog	Radha's Husband	
1983	Main Awara Hoon	Sardar Trilochan	
1984	Ghar Ek Mandi	Announcer during Bidding	
1984	Mera Faisla	Jaleel	
1984	Yaadgar	Chhote Lal	
1984	Phulwari	Dr. Gupta	
1985	Baadal	Sharbati	
1985	Haveli	Havildar Hingorani	
1986	Sasti Dulhan Mahenga Dulha	Fauja Singh	
1986	Ghar Sansar	Police Inspector Sharma	
1987	Dak Bangla	Gareebdas Daulat Ram	
1987	Hukumat	Charlie	
1988	Pyaar Ka Mandir	Astrologer Parmeshwar Shivaramakrishna	
1988	Veerana	Manager (Thakela Guest House)	
1989	Main Tera Dushman	Police Constable Dukhiram	
1989	Elaan-E-Jung	Manager of Massage Parlour	
1989	Sindoor Aur Bandook		
1989	Doosra Keval	Chowkidar	TV Series
1990	Naag Nagin	Sarpat	
1990	Pyar Ka Karz	Doctor	
1991	Farishtay	Mohanlal	
1991	Ajooba	Spectator in Public	Special appearance
1992	Tahalka	Lifeguard At Swimming Pool	
1992	Bol Radha Bol	Blind Man	
1994	Ekka Raja Rani	John	
1994	Eena Meena Deeka	Cashier in Bank	Guest appearance
1995	Taaqat	Rajendranath, host in Cookery program seen on television	
1995	Sauda	Real estate agent Deendayal "Deenu"	
1998	Laash		Last film
1995-2006	Hum Paanch	Jeetendra Bharadwaj as Popatlal, Anand's boss	TV series
