= Manzil Manzil =

- Theatrical release poster
- Directed by: Nasir Hussain
- Screenplay by: Sachin Bhowmick
- Dialogues by: Nasir Hussain
- Story by: Sachin Bhowmick
- Produced by: Nasir Hussain
- Starring: Sunny Deol; Dimple Kapadia; Danny Denzongpa; Kulbhushan Kharbanda; Asha Parekh (special appearance); Prem Chopra
- Cinematography: Munir Khan
- Edited by: Zafar Sultan
- Music by: R. D. Burman
- Production company: Nasir Hussain Films
- Distributed by: Eros International
- Release date: 16 November 1984
- Country: India
- Language: Hindi

Manzil Manzil is a 1984 Indian romantic drama film directed by Nasir Hussain. The film stars Sunny Deol and Dimple Kapadia, along with Danny Denzongpa, Kulbhushan Kharbanda, Prem Chopra and Asha Parekh. Parekh had been a heroine in Hussain's films from 1959 to 1971. She returned here in a supporting role as the hero's mother.

== Plot ==
The film's protagonist, Vijay, is a young man who lives in the hills with his mother. Vijay is undergoing the training to become a Range Forest Officer. In a different part of India, a wealthy businessman, Mr. Malhotra, has a daughter named Seema. Malhotra wants his daughter to marry Pawan, the son of his closest friend named Gautam, and Seema is open to this idea.

However, a twist of fate changes their plans. While traveling alone in the countryside, Seema's path crosses with Vijay's, and they fall in love. What they don't know is that Mr. Malhotra has also been approached by an international smuggler named Niranjan Das, who is impersonating Malhotra's childhood friend. The smuggler has a sinister agenda: he wants Seema to marry his son, Roopesh, to gain access to the Malhotra family's wealth and business.

Tragedy strikes when Seema is involved in an accident and loses her memory. She is taken in and cared for by Gautam, the man whose son her father initially wanted her to marry. Gautam, for reasons of his own, keeps Seema isolated and does not allow anyone, including Vijay, to see her. This creates a major obstacle for Vijay, who is desperately trying to reconnect with the woman he loves. Unknown to both Vijay and Gautam, Vijay is actually Gautam’s son.

The film's central conflict revolves around Vijay's struggle to reach Seema, and for Seema to regain her memory. Even if she does recover her memory, she faces the immense pressure of her father's choice, who has been manipulated into consenting to her marriage with the villainous Roopesh.

Manzil Manzil follows Vijay's quest to uncover the truth about Niranjan Das and his illegal activities, while also battling for the love of his life against formidable odds. The story is a journey of love, deception, and a fight for justice, culminating in a dramatic conclusion where the hero must overcome the bad people and reclaim his love.

== Cast ==
- Sunny Deol as Vijay / Sonu
- Dimple Kapadia as Seema Malhotra – Vijay’s girlfriend
- Danny Denzongpa as Gautam / Pahadi baba – Vijay's father
- Asha Parekh (special appearance) as Vijay's mother – Gautam’s wife
- Kulbhushan Kharbanda as Mr. Malhotra – Seema’s father, Gautam’s friend
- Prem Chopra as Niranjan Das
- Firoz as Roopesh – Niranjan’s associate
- Tariq Khan as Deepak
- Surendra Pal as Niranjan’s associate
- Aamir Khan as Assistant director.

== Music and soundtrack ==
The music of the film was composed by R. D. Burman and the lyrics of the songs were penned by Majrooh Sultanpuri.

#	Song	Singer
1	"Jhalak Dikhake"	Shailendra Singh
2	"O Meri Jaan" (Solo)	Shailendra Singh
3	"O Meri Jaan" (Duet)	Shailendra Singh, Asha Bhosle
4	"Loot Gaye Hum To Raahon Mein"	Shailendra Singh, Asha Bhosle
5	"Yeh Naina Yaad Hai Ke Bhool Gaye"	Shailendra Singh, Asha Bhosle
6	"Hey Baba"	Asha Bhosle
7	"Mitwa"	Asha Bhosle
8	"Man Re Pyar Hari Ke"	Chandrashekhar Gadgil
9	"Title Music"	R. D. Burman
