= Jhuk Gaya Aasman =

- Directed by: Lekh Tandon
- Based on: Here Comes Mr. Jordan (1941)
- Produced by: R. D. Bansal; Ramesh Lamba
- Starring: Rajendra Kumar; Saira Banu
- Cinematography: Dwarka Divecha
- Edited by: Pran Mehra
- Music by: Shankar Jaikishan
- Release date: 1 September 1968
- Country: India
- Language: Hindi

Jhuk Gaya Aasman (Note: The literal translation of this name is "The Skies Have Bowed". However in Hindi this metaphor is mostly used to indicate such huge efforts on the part of a human, that even the skies bow in respect to his efforts and courage. Here Sanjay gets killed due to a divine mistake and finds himself reincarnated in the body of a person, whom his erstwhile girl friend Priya loathes. The entire film is a story of his tireless efforts to win back his girl friend.) is a 1968 romantic comedy film directed by Lekh Tandon. It stars Rajendra Kumar, Saira Banu, Rajendranath and Prem Chopra. The music is by Shankar Jaikishan. The film is a remake of the American film Here Comes Mr. Jordan (1941). The film was commercially unsuccessful on its initial release, but has since garnered appreciation from both critics and audience. The rights to this film are owned by Shah Rukh Khan's Red Chillies Entertainment.

== Plot ==
Sanjay is a poor man making his living as a tourist guide in Darjeeling. He meets Priya Khanna, who has come from Calcutta. The duo fall in love. Everything is hunky dory for them, until Priya receives the news of her father's arrest. The duo decide to put their dreams on the hold until Priya's father is exonerated. Priya leaves, while Sanjay returns, hopeful and joyous. However, he dies in a car accident and is escorted by Hindu deity of death, Yamaraj, for the retribution of his sins.

It is revealed that Sanjay was never supposed to die. Yamaraj learns that he mistakenly killed Sanjay instead of his look alike, Tarun Kumar. As punishment, Yamaraj is tasked with sending Sanjay back to Earth. On Earth, Sanjay's body has already been cremated. Realizing that now Sanjay's soul has to be put in somebody else's body, Yamaraj takes him to Tarun's home. Unknown to them, Tarun has been shot in the back by his own brother mere seconds ago. Yamaraj retrieves the bullet and tells Sanjay to occupy Tarun's body.

Priya succeeds in bailing out her father and learns from him that he was framed by Tarun. Meanwhile, Sanjay learns that Tarun was a criminal and correctly deduces that he was killed for his money. Tarun's errant ways have dissociated him from his grandmother, his only living relative. Sanjay decides to right Tarun's wrongs. Tarun's brother is shocked to see him alive, but Sanjay feigns ignorance. Tarun's secretary Rita is working for his brother secretly. Here, Priya comes back to exact revenge on Tarun, but is obviously stunned to see him.

Sanjay is saddened by the turn of events. He succeeds in convincing his friend (Rajendra Nath) about his true identity. Later, he slowly starts shutting Tarun's illegitimate businesses and diverts the money to charity instead. This sudden change stuns and surprises Tarun's grandmother, while his brother is angered at losing money to this newfound philanthropy. Sanjay starts courting Priya again. Seeing that Tarun has reformed, everybody gives him their blessing to his marriage with Priya. However, Rita drops a bombshell that she is married to Tarun.

Sanjay is unable to prove or disprove anything, making matters worse for him again. However, Rita is acting as a mere pawn in the hands of Tarun's brother. He decides to confront Rita to know the truth, but Tarun's brother has already anticipated it. He kills Rita and Priya is framed for the murder. Sanjay succeeds in running away and confronting Tarun's brother. Tarun's brother finally confesses all his crimes in front of Sanjay, which is also heard by Sanjay's buddy. Just as Sanjay is going to be killed by Tarun's brother, the angel knocks him out.

In the end, Tarun's brother is arrested on the basis of his testimony. Realizing that Sanjay will now be able to live the life in form of Tarun, the very life that was unjustly taken from him, the angel unites him with Priya and returns to his heavenly abode.

== Cast ==
- Rajendra Kumar as
  - Sanjay Kumar "Refugee"
  - Tarun Kumar "T. K." "Battu" "Pappu" Saxena
- Saira Banu as Priya Khanna
- Rajendra Nath as Hanuman Singh
- Prem Chopra as Prem Kumar Saxena, Tarun's evil brother
- Durga Khote as Mrs. Saxena, Tarun's grandmother
- Parveen Choudhary as Rita Saxena, Tarun's wife
- Hari Shivdasani as B.K.
- Gajanan Jagirdar as Shankarlal Khanna, Priya's father
- Brahm Bhardwaj as Devilal
- Krishan Dhawan as Ramdas
- Ram Avtar as Motumal
- David Abraham Cheulkar as Yamaraj, Hindu deity of death
- Ratan Gaurang as Gaurang
- Randhir as Hanuman's maternal uncle
- Madhumati as Priya's hostel friend
- Ruby Mayer as Girl's hostel superintendent
- Meena T. as Priya's hostel friend

== Soundtrack ==
The song "Kaun Hai Jo Sapnon Mein Aaya" was a copy of Elvis Presley's "Marguerita" from the film Fun in Acapulco. The song "Kisi Ki Jaan Lete Hain" was sampled for beginning of Black Eye Peas's song My Humps.

No.	Title	Lyrics	Singer(s)	Length
1.	"Mere Tumhare Beech Mein"	Shailendra	Lata Mangeshkar
2.	"Meri Ankhon Ki Nindiya"	Hasrat Jaipuri	Mohammed Rafi, Lata Mangeshkar
3.	"Sachcha Hai Pyar Mera Agar"	Shailendra	Mohammed Rafi
4.	"Kahan Chal Diye Idhar To Aao"	Hasrat Jaipuri	Mohammed Rafi
5.	"Unse Mili Nazar Ke Mere Hosh Ud Gai"	Hasrat Jaipuri	Lata Mangeshkar
6.	"Sachcha Hai Pyar Mera Agar"	Shailendra	Mohammed Rafi
7.	"Kisi Ki Jaan Lete Hain"	S. H. Bihari	Asha Bhosle
8.	"Kaun Hai Jo Sapnon Mein Aaya"	Hasrat Jaipuri	Mohammed Rafi
