= Pyar Ka Mausam =

- Poster
- Directed by: Nasir Hussain
- Written by: Nasir Hussain
- Produced by: Nasir Hussain
- Starring: Shashi Kapoor; Asha Parekh; Nirupa Roy; Bharat Bhushan; Krishan Mehta; Rajendra Nath
- Cinematography: Munir Khan
- Edited by: Babu Rao Lavande; Gurudutt
- Music by: R. D. Burman
- Production company: Nasir Husain Films Pvt. Ltd.
- Release date: 1969
- Running time: 154 minutes
- Country: India
- Language: Hindi

Pyar Ka Mausam (transl. Season of love) is a 1969 Indian Hindi-language musical romance film under Nasir Hussain films banner. Its plot has much similarity to Hussain's own earlier film, Tumsa Nahin Dekha, with Ameeta and Shammi Kapoor in the lead roles. It starred Shashi Kapoor, and the Nasir Husain fixture, Asha Parekh. It also had Bharat Bhushan, Nirupa Roy, Madan Puri, Tahir Hussain and another Nasir Husain fixture, Rajendranath. Nasir's nephew Faisal Khan who was 3 years old at the time, plays Shashi Kapoor's character as a child. Two more Husain fixtures were responsible for the memorable songs: lyricist, Majrooh Sultanpuri and music composer, R.D. Burman. R.D. Burman also had an acting role in the film. The film became a silver jubilee hit.

== Analysis ==
The story was on Nasir Husain's favorite theme, a family whose members get separated at the start of the movie and after much action are reunited at the end of the movie, famously known as the "lost-and-found" theme or trope in Bollywood. The theme song (Tum Bin Jaoon Kahan) is played several times in the film: Mohammed Rafi's version is picturized on the hero Shashi Kapoor three times, while Kishore Kumar's version is picturized on Bharat Bhushan twice. The song is a key part of the movie like the key songs in later movies of Nasir Hussain (Yaadon Ki Baraat and Hum Kisise Kum Naheen). The key song helps in uniting long lost family/lovers in all three films.

== Plot ==
Seema is the only child of widowed Mohan, who is adopted by Mohan's boss, Sardar Ranjit Singh, who has no heir to his estate, as his daughter, Jamuna, eloped with a poor peasant, Gopal. Ranjit does not get along with his step-brother, Shankar. Jamuna manages to placate her dad, and he goes to her house, only to find it in flames with Gopal burned to death, and their son, Sunder, missing. Years later, Seema has now grown up and meets with a young man named Pyarelal in Ooty. She meets him a year later, but this time he introduces himself as Jhatpat Singh, a man she was supposedly engaged to in their childhood. Shortly thereafter she meets with the real Jhatpat Singh, and changes her mind about the fake Jhatpat Singh alias Pyarelal. Now, Sunil knows that he was adopted and understands that he was the lost son of Gopal. He goes to Sardar Ranjit Singh and appoints to be an estate manager. There, he meets Seema again and they rekindle their romance. By that time, planning to steal away property, Shankar sends his son as the lost son of Jamuna and Gopal. Ranjit Singh believes him and wants to marry Seema to Shankar's son. After some misunderstandings, family finally reunites and Jamuna's sanity returns. Movie ends with the marriage of Seema and Sunil/Sunder.

It is one of two films in which music director, Rahul Dev Burman, plays an acting role (of Jhatpat Singh's assistant) in the film apart from giving the music for the film; the other being Bhoot Bungla.

== Cast ==
- Shashi Kapoor as Sunder/Sunil/Pyarelal
- Asha Parekh as Seema Kumar
- Bharat Bhushan as Gopal
- Nirupa Roy as Jamuna
- Kishen Mehta as Ramesh
- Iftekhar as Keshav
- Rajendra Nath as Fake Jhatpat Singh
- Asit Sen as Kunvar Saheb
- Riyasat Ali Wasti as Sardar Ranjit Kumar
- M. B. Shetty as Samson
- Faisal Khan as Young Sunder
- Birbal as Real Jhatpat Singh
- Karen Lesley as Ms. Loveleena
- Dulari as Kamla Kumar
- Tabassum as Tara
- Laxmi Chhaya as Lajwanti 'Lajjo'
- Madan Puri as Shanker
- Rahul Dev Burman as Assistant of Real Jhatpat Singh

== Soundtrack ==
Pyar Ka Mausam

Soundtrack album by R.D. Burman
- Released: January 1, 1969
- Genre: Feature film soundtrack
- Length: 38:03
- Label: Saregama India
- Producer: R.D. Burman

R.D. Burman chronology
Abhilasha (1968)	Pyar Ka Mausam (1969)	Waris (1969)

Official audio
- Pyar Ka Mausam – Full Album on YouTube

All lyrics are written by Majrooh Sultanpuri; all music is composed by R. D. Burman.

Songs
No.	Title	Singer(s)	Length
1.	"Tum Bin Jaoon Kahan"	Kishore Kumar	3:30
2.	"Aap Chahen Mujhko"	Lata Mangeshkar	4:31
3.	"Aap Se Miliye"	Lata Mangeshkar	6:27
4.	"Main Na Miloongi"	Lata Mangeshkar	3:41
5.	"Na Ja Mere Hamdam"	Lata Mangeshkar	5:07
6.	"Ni Sultana Re"	Lata Mangeshkar, Mohammed Rafi	5:06
7.	"Che Khush Nazare"	Mohammed Rafi	4:24
8.	"Tum Bin Jaun Kahan - Sad Version"	Mohammed Rafi	1:48
9.	"Tum Bin Jaoon Kahan"	Mohammed Rafi	3:26
Total length:			38:03
