= Chirag =

- DVD cover
- Directed by: Raj Khosla
- Written by: Akthar Mirza; G. R. Kamat; O. P. Dutta; Akhtar ul Iman
- Produced by: Premji
- Starring: Sunil Dutt; Asha Parekh
- Cinematography: V. Gopi Krishna
- Edited by: Das Dhaimade
- Music by: Madan Mohan
- Distributed by: Suchitra
- Release date: October 10, 1969
- Country: India
- Language: Hindi

Chirag (English: Lamp) is a 1969 Indian Bollywood film directed by Raj Khosla. The film stars Sunil Dutt and Asha Parekh in the lead roles. The film features the songs "Teri Aankhon Ke Siwa", sung separately by Mohammad Rafi and Lata Mangeshkar, which became quite popular, as well as "Mere Bichhade Sathi Sunta Ja" and "Chhayi Barakha Bahar", both sung by Lata Mangeshkar. Another song "Chirag Dil Ka Jalao", sung by Mohammad Rafi, was not featured in the film. The film performed well at the box office.

In an interview, Asha Parekh said about Sunil Dutt, "Dutt Saab was God’s child. He was a saint in the truest sense of the word. We did Chirag together where I had played a blind girl. Dutt Saab was so supportive and gentle as if I was really blind."

== Plot ==
Ajay Singh meets Asha Chibber, and is led to believe that she belongs to a wealthy family. After a few misunderstandings, he does find out that she is a simple girl living a poor lifestyle. Both do fall in love, and Ajay goes to meet Asha's brother, Dr. O.P. Chibber, and his wife, Shanti. They are pleased to meet him, and Ajay's mother, Gayetridevi visits them and approves of Asha. Ajay and Asha get married and settle down. After marriage Asha is expected to conceive, but she is unable to do so. After a certain incident she also loses her eyesight and becomes dependent on Ajay. Frustrated Gayetridevi decides to ask Asha to leave the house while Ajay has gone for a business meeting. Asha then goes to live with her brother and sister-in-law who welcome her back with open arms. a little while later Ajay returns and heads to Dr. Chibber's house to collect Asha and bring her back. upon reaching the house, he is met coldly by Dr. Chibber who accuses him of allowing Asha to be abused by her mother-in law. Ajay assures him that he wholeheartedly loves Asha and that his mother means no such thing. While walking up the stairs to collect Asha from her room, he discovers that she is not there and has attempted to commit suicide by jumping into the raging river below her balcony. Dr. Chibber and Ajay rush frantically to search for her, but to no avail. Presuming that Asha has died, a heartbroken Ajay returns home to an anxious Gayetridevi who receives news from him that Asha has died, and her body has not been found. Asha survives her suicide attempt and is rescued by a washerman and his wife near a riverbank who take her to their home and assist her. A few days pass when it is revealed that Asha is finally pregnant with Ajay's child. A grieving Ajay subsequently has a car accident and lands in the hospital. when Ajay is discharged, Gayetridevi pressures him into agreeing to an arranged marriage with her secretary's niece as she believes the girl will bear an heir and carry their family legacy forward, as opposed to Asha. Unable to oppose his mother, Ajay agrees, promising her that the girl will get married. while still living with the washerman and his wife Asha gives birth to a boy. Knowing that the child will grow up without his father, the washerman convinces Asha to return to her husband with their child. The day of Ajay's wedding, Asha arrives to her Husband's house and hands her child to Gayetridevi, who is shocked, she runs with the child to stop Ajay's wedding and inform him that Asha is alive and has given birth to his son. the wedding is halted and Gayetridevi apologizes to Asha for her previous bullying. meanwhile Ajay and Asha reunite, embracing each other. Thus, ending the story happily.

== Cast ==
- Sunil Dutt as Ajay Singh
- Asha Parekh as Asha Chibber
- Om Prakash as Dr. O.P. Chibber
- Kanhaiyalal as Singh's employee
- Mukri as Tingu
- Sulochana Latkar as Shanti Chibber (as Sulochana)
- Dulari as Malinya
- Lalita Pawar as Gayetridevi Singh
- Nazir Hussain as Malinya's husband
- Snehlata as Sandhya

== Awards ==
- Nominated, Filmfare Best Actress Award - Asha Parekh

== Soundtrack ==
Chirag

Studio album by Madan Mohan
- Released: 1969 (India)
- Genre: Feature film soundtrack
- Label: Saregama
- Producer: Madan Mohan

Madan Mohan chronology
Ek Kali Muskai (1968)	Chirag (1969)	Dastak (1970)

The soundtrack of the film contains 7 songs. The music for all the songs were composed by Madan Mohan and the lyrics were penned by Majrooh Sultanpuri. Raj Khosla wanted Majrooh to use the line from faiz's poetry for the song "Teri Aankhon Ke Siwa Duniya", for which permission was obtained.

#	Title	Singer(s)	Duration	Raga
1	"Teri Aankhon Ke Siwa Duniya (Male)"	Mohammed Rafi	04:13	Jhinjhoti
2	"Chhai Barkha Bahar"	Lata Mangeshkar	06:15	
3	"Bhor Hote Kaga"	Lata Mangeshkar	03:53	
4	"Teri Aankhon Ke Siwa Duniya (Female)"	Lata Mangeshkar	04:29	Jhinjhoti
5	"Jab Dekh Liya"	Mohammed Rafi	04:45	
6	"More Bichhade Saathi"	Lata Mangeshkar	05:19	
7	"Chirag Dil Ka Jalao"	Mohammed Rafi	04:22	
