= Walk of the Stars =

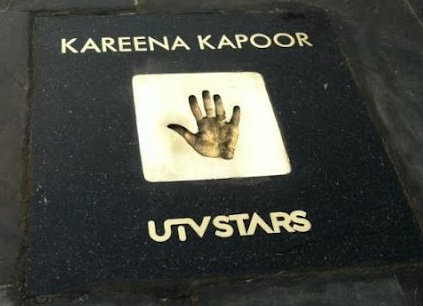
- Kareena Kapoor's hand print at the Walk of the Stars.

- Location within Mumbai
- Established: 28 March 2012
- Dissolved: 2014
- Location: Bandstand Promenade, Bandra, Mumbai
- Coordinates: 19.042718°N 72.819132°E
- Type: Entertainment hall of fame
- Founder: UTV
- Owner: UTV

The Walk of the Stars was a section of the Bandstand Promenade in Bandra, Mumbai honouring Bollywood film stars. The path features about six statues of famous Bollywood actors as well as about 100 brass plates embossed with the handprints and signatures of other stars. The walk is inspired by the Hollywood Walk of Fame. It is funded and privately managed by UTV and promoted through their UTV Stars television channel. The walk is 2 km long. It was inaugurated by actress Kareena Kapoor on 28 March 2012, with actor Randhir Kapoor and filmmaker Madhur Bhandarkar also present. The section was dissolved in 2014.

== Cost ==
A brass statue on the Walk of Stars cost ₹3.5 million (US$37,000).

== Stars honoured ==
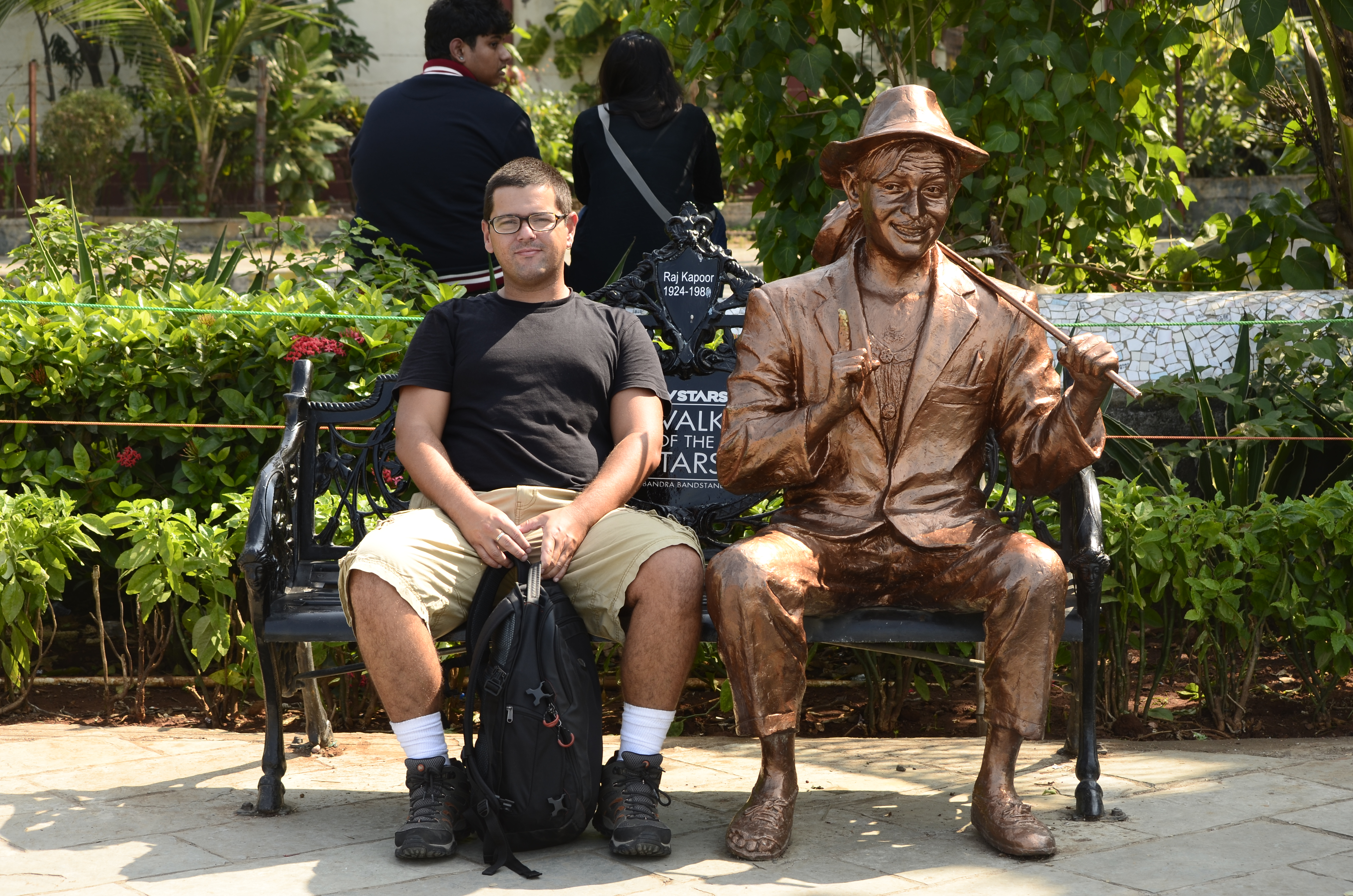
A tourist poses next to a statue of Raj Kapoor.

The following stars had been honoured with an autograph, tile or statue on the Walk of the Stars.

Name	Autograph	Handprint	Statue
Rajesh Khanna			check
Yash Chopra			check
Dev Anand	check		check
Shammi Kapoor	check		check
Raj Kapoor	check		check
Prithviraj Kapoor	check		
Ashok Kumar	check		
Guru Dutt	check		
Kishore Kumar	check		
Meena Kumari	check		
Nargis	check		
Sunil Dutt	check		
Anupam Kher		check	
Ajay Devgn		check	
Asha Parekh		check	
Kareena Kapoor		check	
Karisma Kapoor		check	
Neetu Kapoor		check	
Randhir Kapoor		check	
Rishi Kapoor		check	
Shabana Azmi		check	
Sharmila Tagore		check	
Shashi Kapoor		check	
Sonakshi Sinha		check	
Jeetendra		check	
Mahesh Bhatt		check	
Sridevi		check	
Vidya Balan		check	

== See also ==
- Bollywood
- Bandstand Promenade
- Hollywood Walk of Fame
