= Zabardast =

- Theatrical release poster
- Directed by: Nasir Hussain
- Screenplay by: Sachin Bhowmick
- Dialogues by: Nasir Hussain
- Story by: Sachin Bhowmick
- Produced by: Mushir Alam; Mohammad Riaz
- Starring: Sanjeev Kumar; Sunny Deol; Jaya Prada; Rajiv Kapoor; Rati Agnihotri
- Cinematography: Munir Khan
- Edited by: Zafar Sultan; Dilip Kotalgi
- Music by: R. D. Burman
- Production company: M R Productions Pvt. Ltd.
- Distributed by: Mushir-Riaz
- Release date: 21 June 1985
- Country: India
- Language: Hindi

Zabardast (meaning "Fantastic" in Hindi) is a 1985 Indian Hindi action film directed by Nasir Hussain, with his nephew Aamir Khan as assistant director, and produced by Mushir-Riaz. The film stars Sanjeev Kumar, Sunny Deol, Jaya Prada, Rajiv Kapoor, Rati Agnihotri and Amrish Puri. This was Hussain's final film as a director. He originally conceived the project with an entirely different cast in 1979 but then in 1983 he scrapped it and started from scratch.

== Plot ==
Ratan Kumar lives a middle-class existence with his wife, Pushpa and son, Sunder. When he is asked to commit a theft for Balram Singh, he does so, but decides to keep a suitcase full of diamonds for himself. An enraged Balram sets fire to his house. Believing his wife to be dead, Ratan flees, is rescued by Dr. Saigal, taken to the palace of a distraught Maharani Maanwati, who has just lost her son and husband, but is placated after being told that Sunder is her son. For years, Ratan, who now calls himself Ramesh, works for the Maharani, and when Sunder grows up, the Maharani learns of Ramesh's existence, finds that he closely resembles her husband, and marries him. Shortly thereafter, Pushpa re-surfaces, an enraged Maharani attempts to kill Ramesh, but ends up killing herself, before dying she asks Sunder to avenge her death. Sunder now hates Ramesh, not knowing that Ramesh is his real father. Fleeing from Sunder and the Police's wrath, Ramesh is apprehended by the Police, tried in Court, and sentenced to several years in jail. When he returns, he becomes an underworld don, with a sole motive of bringing an end to Balram. Meanwhile, Sunder, who now calls himself Shyam, is also on the lookout for Ramesh for taking his revenge, and has befriended Ravi, Ramesh's second son, who was born during his tenure in prison. When Balram finds this out, he plots to use Shyam to bring an end to Ramesh and his entire family - once and for all. Later, Shyam learns that Ramesh is his real father and innocent. It is now up to Shyam (Sunder) to save his father and family from Balram.

== Cast ==
- Sanjeev Kumar as Ratan Kumar/Ramesh Kumar - Pushpa's husband, Sunder and Ravi's father
- Sunny Deol as Sunder Kumar/Shyam - Ratan and Pushpa's son, Ravi's brother
- Jaya Prada as Mala Sehgal - Sunder's girlfriend
- Rajiv Kapoor as Ravi Kumar/Tony - Ratan and Pushpa's son, Sunder's brother
- Rati Agnihotri as Sunita - Ravi's girlfriend
- Tanuja as Maharani Maanwati - Sunder's adoptive mother
- Gita Siddharth as Puspha Kumar - Ratan's wife, Sunder and Ravi's mother
- Kulbhushan Kharbanda as Dr. Sehgal - Mala's father
- Amrish Puri as Balram Singh
- Tariq as Anwar - Sunder's friend
- Rajendra Nath as Monty
- Arjun as Vikram Singh - Balram's son
- Mac Mohan as Bheema
- Ravindra Kapoor as Dilawar Khan
- Vikas Anand as Police Inspector Verma

== Soundtrack ==
R. D. Burman provided the music and Majrooh Sultanpuri penned all the songs. The song "Jab Chaaha Yaara Tumne", sung by Kishore Kumar, is an evergreen classic.

Song	Singer
"Jab Chaaha Yaara Tumne, Aankhon Se Maara Tumne"	Kishore Kumar
"Dekho Idhar Janaab-E-Man, Kahan Kho Gaye"	Kishore Kumar
"Bhool Ho Gayi, Jaane De Sajna, Mar Jaaungi, Maan Jaa"	Kishore Kumar, Asha Bhosle
"Karega Zamana Kya, Sach Ko Chhupana Kya"	Kishore Kumar, Asha Bhosle
"Suno Sitamgar Mere"	R. D. Burman, Asha Bhosle
"Aise Na Thukrao, Ae Sanam"	Asha Bhosle
