= Chandan Ka Palna =

- Directed by: Ismail Memon
- Written by: Ismail Memon
- Produced by: Zaibunnisa Usman Ali
- Starring: Meena Kumari; Durga Khote; Dharmendra; Mehmood
- Cinematography: D.C. Mehta
- Edited by: Vitthal Bankar
- Music by: R. D. Burman
- Release date: 17 September 1967
- Running time: 166 Mins
- Country: India
- Language: Hindi

Chandan Ka Palna is a 1967 Bollywood film starring Dharmendra and Meena Kumari.

== Plot ==
Radha belonged to a rich family. Her sole aim in life after becoming a widow, was to see her son Ajit happy and fulfil the promise she had given to her husband that the family name and tradition would be perpetuated. Finding Ajit deeply in love with Shobha, the Raisaheb's daughter who too loved him no less, Radha got them married, hoping that Shobha would prove an ideal wife and daughter-in-law and their home would soon resound with merry laughter of a child, if not children. Three years went by and Radha was still waiting for the new arrival in the family. Her patience was running out. Desperate, she took Shobha to a doctor who, after prolonged examination and treatment, told her that God alone could help her fulfill her yearning for a grandchild. Radha's sorrow knows no bounds. She could not think of the family chain breaking off. She had to have a grandchild and fulfil her promise to her late husband. As a last resort, she takes Shobha to Gurudev, the spiritual soul revered by the family. Gurudev has pity on Radha's plight and after taking her into confidence, tells her the fact that Shobha can never have a child. Shobha after hearing this is left in a state of shock. Being very well aware of her mother-in-law's craving for a grandchild, life seems without a ray of hope for Shobha to live. She decides to put an end to it. It was better that way, she thinks, than to suffer the humiliation of being branded barren forever. She knows how deeply her husband loved her and can very well imagine his dilemma when forced to marry again for the sake of a child. Ultimately, she starts walking in the direction of fatal plunge to end all problems, to end herself. But destiny had other things written down for Shobha.

== Cast ==
- Meena Kumari as Shobha Rai
- Dharmendra as Ajit
- Mehmood as Mahesh Chandra Mukhopadhyay
- Mumtaz as Sadhana
- Durga Khote as Radha Laxmidas
- Asit Sen as Seth Sevaram
- Nazir Hussain as Rai Sahib Badrinath
- Bipin Gupta as Gurudev
- Dhumal as Gopi
- Mukri as Munshi Chhote Lal

== Soundtrack ==
Chandan Ka Palna

Soundtrack album by R.D. Burman
- Released: January 1, 1967
- Genre: Feature film soundtrack
- Length: 36:54
- Label: Saregama India
- Producer: R.D. Burman

R.D. Burman chronology
Teesri Manzil (1966)	Chandan Ka Palna (1967)	Baharon Ke Sapne (1967)

All lyrics are written by Anand Bakshi; all music is composed by R.D. Burman.

Songs
No.	Title	Singer(s)	Length
1.	"Sharabi Mera Naam"	Lata Mangeshkar	5:20
2.	"Zulfon Ko Aap Yun Na Sanwara Karo"	Asha Bhosle and Mohammed Rafi	4:49
3.	"O Ganga Maiya Paar Laga De"	Lata Mangeshkar	4:53
4.	"Tumhe Dekha Hai"	Mohammed Rafi	4:56
5.	"Nir Ta Ta Dhang"	Manna Dey and Mohammed Rafi	2:43
6.	"Kya Baat Karte Ho"	Asha Bhosle and Manna Dey	6:00
7.	"Kis Karan Kamini Sharmaye"	Lata Mangeshkar and Usha Mangeshkar	3:26
8.	"Mastana Huye Parwana Huye"	Asha Bhosle and Manna Dey	4:43
Total length:			36:54
