= Aaye Din Bahar Ke =

- Directed by: Raghunath Jalani
- Written by: Sachin Bhowmick
- Produced by: J. Om Prakash
- Starring: Dharmendra; Asha Parekh; Balraj Sahni; Nazima
- Cinematography: V. Babasaheb
- Edited by: Pratap Dave
- Music by: Laxmikant Pyarelal
- Release date: 4 November 1966
- Country: India
- Language: Hindi

Aaye Din Bahar Ke (transl. Here come the happy days or here come the days of spring) is a 1966 Indian Hindi-language film produced by J. Om Prakash. The film stars Dharmendra, Asha Parekh, Sulochana Devi, Balraj Sahni, Nazima and Rajindernath.

It became a box office hit and stood 7th in Indian box office collections that year.

== Plot summary ==
Ravi is a strapping young man who lives with his widowed mother and the family is one of modest means. While still studying in college, Ravi takes a position as tutor to Kanchan, beautiful daughter of Diwan Jankidas, a rich man belonging to a prestigious family. Ravi and Kanchan fall in love. Jankidas also grows fond of Ravi, who he sees as a responsible and hardworking young man. Ravi tops his batch in the final exams and his prospects look good. Jankidas approaches Ravi's mother with a marriage proposal and, after a little hesitation, Jamuna Devi gives her consent for her son to marry Kanchan.

The day of the engagement ceremony dawns. The guests are assembled in Jankidas's mansion, and among them is his sister, played by Leela Mishra. The lady guests are introduced by turn to Ravi's mother and they each say a few words of congratulation to her. When it is Leela Mishra's turn, she speaks a few words and then begins to feel that she has seen Jamuna Devi somewhere. Then it hits her: Jamuna Devi is the woman who had become notorious in Ambala town because she had become pregnant without marriage and borne an illegitimate child. Leela Mishra immediately informs her brother and confronts Jamuna Devi, who is overcome to the point of collapsing into a faint. Jankidas declares that there will be no engagement. He asks Ravi and to take his collapsed mother and leave his house forthwith. Reaching home, Ravi asks his mother to deny the allegations and explain the facts to him.

But fate has other plans for them, as Ravi soon finds out that he is the child of an unmarried lady and hence the marriage is called off.

Then he goes in search of his father and so does Kanchan, in search of Ravi. When he returns to his mother, along with his father, he cannot find his mother because she is reported dead.

Then he goes to live with his father, who is a judge, but doesn't tell him that he is his dad.

Then he learns the truth and finds his mother. A nurse who is a friend of Kanchan comes to take care of his mother, falls for him and tries hard to make him fall for him. But when she learns that he loves Kanchan, she brings them together.

== Cast ==
- Dharmendra... Ravi Shukla / Prakash
- Asha Parekh... Kanchan
- Balraj Sahni... Shukla (Ravi's father)
- Sulochana Devi... Jamuna Devi Shukla (Ravi's mother)
- Raj Mehra... Jankidas (Kanchan's father)
- Dulari... Kanchan's mother
- Leela Mishra... Jankidas's sister
- Nazima... Rachna, nurse who loves Ravi
- Sarita Devi... Jamuna's neighbour and confident who explains matters to Ravi
- Khairati...Sunder's customer discussing twelve children
- Rajendra Nath... Anmol Ratan, the film's comedy actor
- Sabita Chatterjee... seen opposite Anmol
- Sunder... astrologer, father of Anmol
- C. S. Dubey... in the bar with Ravi
- Nazir Kashmiri... Deenu
- Mubarak... Dr. Verma (?)
- Madhu Apte... Mujra dancer
- Brahm Bhardwaj... advocate

== Soundtrack ==
Music composed by Laxmikant Pyarelal and lyrics written by Anand Bakshi

#	Song	Singer	Raga
1	"Mere Dushman"	Mohammed Rafi	
2	"Khudaaya Khair"	Mohammed Rafi	
3	"Suno Sajna"	Lata Mangeshkar	
4	"Mera Mehboob"	Lata Mangeshkar	
5	"Yeh Kali Jab Talak"	Lata Mangeshkar, Mahendra Kapoor	
6	"Aaye Kaash Kisi Deewane Ko"	Lata Mangeshkar, Asha Bhosle	
7	"Khat Likh De"	Asha Bhosle	Khamaj
