= Jab Pyar Kisi Se Hota Hai =

1961 film by Nasir Hussain

- Poster
- Directed by: Nasir Hussain
- Written by: Nasir Hussain
- Produced by: Nasir Hussain
- Starring: Dev Anand; Asha Parekh; Pran; Rajendra Nath
- Cinematography: Dilip Gupta
- Edited by: Babu Rao
- Music by: Shankar Jaikishan
- Release date: 1961
- Country: India
- Language: Hindi
- Box office: ₹ 1,80,00,000

Jab Pyar Kisi Se Hota Hai (transl. When One Falls in Love) is a 1961 Hindi-language musical comedy film that became a box office hit. It was written, produced, and directed by Nasir Hussain. The first film Hussain ever produced, it featured Dev Anand and Hussain fixture Asha Parekh in the leading roles. Pran played the villain in the film and Rajindernath starred in a supporting role.

Hussain would rework some of the elements from this film into a later film, Teesri Manzil (1966). This was also the only time that he used Shankar Jaikishan as music directors and Dev Anand in a leading role. The playback singers were Mohammed Rafi and Lata Mangeshkar.

In 2010, Shammi Kapoor revealed that Nasir Hussain had brazenly offered the film to him. Unhappy with his attitude, Kapoor declined the role. But he opined that this may have been an excuse by Hussain as he had already signed Dev Anand.

== Plot ==
Nisha belongs to a very wealthy family in Neelgaon, India. Having reached marriageable age, she is expected by her businessman father, Sardar Roop Singh, to marry Sohan, the son of a close friend, but she dislikes him. While travelling to Darjeeling with a dance troupe, she meets Popat Lal, the son of one of Roop Singh's business associates. After several misadventures, the two fall in love.

Nisha later takes Popat to meet her father, where he also intends to finalise a business deal. However, when Roop Singh enters the room, Popat has vanished, and another man appears, claiming to be the real Popat Lal. Heartbroken and humiliated, Nisha begins to hate the man she believed she loved.

She later meets him again, and he reveals that his real name is Sunder. He explains that their parents had once promised them to each other in marriage, but that Roop Singh later changed his mind. Convinced by his story, Nisha agrees to marry Sunder despite her father's disapproval.

As the wedding ceremony is about to take place, a man named Khanna arrives and claims that Sunder is already married to a woman named Shanti, whom he allegedly murdered. Khanna further reveals that Sunder is the police's prime suspect in the case. The accusation threatens to destroy the marriage and forces Sunder to defend himself against the shocking allegations.

== Cast ==
- Dev Anand as Sunder / Monto
- Asha Parekh as Nisha R. Singh
- Sulochana Latkar as Malti
- Mubarak as Sardar Roop Singh
- Raj Mehra as Khanna
- Wasti as Shanti
- Rajendra Nath as Popat Lal / Charlie
- Tahir Hussain as Popat Lal's (Rajendra Nath's) secretary
- Dulari as Roop Singh's sister
- Bishan Khanna
- Ram Avtar as Sunder's friend
- Pran as Sohan Mofat Lal

== Soundtrack ==
The music was by Shankar–Jaikishan, and the soundtrack was sung by Mohammed Rafi and Lata Mangeshkar. The song lyrics were written by Hasrat Jaipuri and Shailendra.

The famous song "Aaj Kal Tere Mere Pyar Ke Charche" (used in Brahmachari (1968)) was written for this movie but was not included as Dev Anand rejected it.

Many of the songs went on to become classics and are still popular today, particularly, "Jiya O Jiya (Jab Pyar Kisi Se Hota Hai)" and "Teri Zulfon Se Judai," sung by Mohammed Rafi, were big hits, as was "Sau Saal Pehle," sung by Mohammad Rafi and Lata Mangeshkar. "Sau Saal Pehle" was later used in the Tamil film Vallavanukku Vallavan as "Manam Ennum".

In one scene, Popat Lal (Rajendra Nath) hums a song "Baba, Man Ki Aankhen Khol", which is originally from 1935 movie Dhoop Chhaon.

| # | Song | Singer(s) | Lyrics | Picturized on |
|---|---|---|---|---|
| 1 | "Jiya O Jiya" | Mohammed Rafi | Hasrat Jaipuri | Picturized on Dev Anand and Asha Parekh |
| 2 | "Yeh Aankhen Uff Yun Maa" | Mohammed Rafi and Lata Mangeshkar | Hasrat Jaipuri | Picturized on Dev Anand and Asha Parekh |
| 3 | "Sau Saal Pehle" | Mohammed Rafi and Lata Mangeshkar | Hasrat Jaipuri | Picturized on Dev Anand and Asha Parekh |
| 4 | "Tum Jaise Bigade Babu Se" | Lata Mangeshkar | Hasrat Jaipuri | Picturized on Asha Parekh |
| 5 | "Teri Zulfon Se Judai" | Mohammed Rafi and Lata Mangeshkar | Hasrat Jaipuri | Picturized on Dev Anand and Asha Parekh |
| 6 | "Bin Dekhe Aur Bin Pehchane" | Mohammad Rafi | Shailendra | Picturized on Dev Ananad |
| 7 | "Nazar Mere Dil Ke Paar Hui" | Lata Mangeshkar | Shailendra | Picturized on Asha Parekh |
| 8 | "Jiya O Jiya" | Lata Mangeshkar | Hasrat Jaipuri | Picturized on Dev Anand and Asha Parekh |
