= Phir Wohi Dil Laya Hoon =

- Directed by: Nasir Hussain
- Produced by: Nasir Hussain
- Starring: Joy Mukherjee; Asha Parekh; Pran
- Cinematography: Marshall Braganza
- Music by: O. P. Nayyar
- Release date: 1963
- Country: India
- Language: Hindi

Phir Wohi Dil Laya Hoon (transl. I've brought back the same heart) is a 1963 Indian Hindi-language film. The film became superhit at the box office. This was Nasir Hussain's second production (his first in colour), after the hit film Jab Pyar Kisi Se Hota Hai (1961). He also wrote and directed it. It starred Joy Mukherjee and the Nasir Hussain fixture Asha Parekh. Pran played the villain in the film and Rajindernath had a supporting role. It also contains many songs that Mohammed Rafi sang beautifully.

This Nasir Hussain film had O.P. Nayyar as the music director. Majrooh Sultanpuri was the lyricist.

The film included songs such as the classical "Dekho Bijli Dole Bin Badal Ki", sung by Asha Bhosle and Usha Mangeshkar. It also included the rhythmic solo melodies like "Aankhon Se Jo Utri Hai Dil Mein", "Mujhe Pyar Mein Tum Na Ilzam Dete" (both sung by Asha Bhosle), "Lakhon Hain Nigah Mein" and "Banda Parwar, Tham Lo Jigar" (both sung by Mohammed Rafi), which are popular even today.

== Plot ==
Due to a growing marital rift between Jamuna and her husband, she decides to leave him. He does not permit her to take their son, so she arranges his abduction, and disappears from her husband's life. Years later, Jamuna's son, Mohan, has grown up, and together they live a middle-class existence. One day, Mohan meets with Mona and both are attracted to each other. But Mona's guardian would like her to marry Biharilal alias Deepu, who is foreign returned and comes from a very wealthy family. Mona and her friends embark on a trip to Srinagar, and Mohan follows her there. Then Jamuna's overjoyed husband announces the return of his son, Mohan, back to his household. When Jamuna gets this news, she is shocked beyond words as the man claiming to be her son, is none other than an impostor named Ramesh. She will have to come out of hiding, admit to abducting Mohan, in order to bring the truth to light. But will Jamuna be willing to re-open the unpleasant past, or will she be content with the way things have turned out to be.

== Cast ==
- Joy Mukherjee as Mohan
- Asha Parekh as Mona
- Pran as Ramesh
- Rajendra Nath as Bihari Lal alias Deepu
- Veena as Jamuna
- Wasti
- Krishan Dhawan as Mr. Kapoor
- Tabassum as Mona's friend
- Ram Avtar as Kamala
- Amar
- Indira Bansal
- Rajendra Singh
- Kanchanamala
- Rani
- Ranjeet Kumar

== Songs ==
This Nasir Hussain film had O. P. Nayyar as the music director and Majrooh Sultanpuri as the lyricist.

Song	Singer	Raga
"Aji Qibla Mohtarma"	Mohammed Rafi	
"Banda Parwar Tham Lo"	Mohammed Rafi	
"Lakhon Hai Nigah Mein"	Mohammed Rafi	
"Aanchal Mein Saja Lena"	Mohammed Rafi	
"Zulfon Ki Chhaon Mein Chehre Ka Ujala Lekar"	Asha Bhosle, Mohammed Rafi	
"Humdum Mere, Khel Na Jano"	Asha Bhosle, Mohammed Rafi	
"Dekho Bijli Dole Bin Badal Ki"	Asha Bhosle, Usha Mangeshkar	
"Aankhon Se Jo Utri Hai"	Asha Bhosle	Kirwani
"Mujhe Pyar Mein Tum"	Asha Bhosle	
