= Dulari (actress) =

Indian actress

- Born: Ambika Gautam; 18 April 1928; Nagpur, Central Provinces and Berar, British India
- Died: 18 January 2013 (aged 84); Pune, Maharashtra, India
- Other names: Rajdulari, Ambika Jagtap
- Occupation: Actress
- Years active: 1943–2000
- Spouse: J. B. Jagtap (m. 1952)
- Children: 1

Dulari (real name Ambika Gautam) (18 April 1928 – 18 January 2013) was an Indian actress, who worked as character actors in Hindi cinema, appearing in 135 films, most notably Jab Pyar Kisi Se Hota Hai (1961), Mujhe Jeene Do (1963), Teesri Kasam (1966), Padosan (1968) and Deewaar (1975).

== Early life ==
Dulari was born on 18 April 1928 in Nagpur, Maharashtra. Her real name was Ambika Gautam. She was a Kanyakubja Brahmin from the Awadh region of Uttar Pradesh. She was nick-named Rajdulari and later on only Dulari remained by which she was known.

== Career ==
Forced to look for work after her father's illness, Dulari made her film debut with Bahen(1941), Hamari Baat (1943), produced by Bombay Talkies, and went to appear as a character actor in over 135 films in the following six decades. Her last screen appearance was in Ziddi (1997) directed by Guddu Dhanoa.

Her most notable role was in Jeevan Jyoti (1953). Her other important roles were in Pati Seva, Rangeen Kahani (1945) and some Gujarati films, Chundi ane Chokha (1957), Gunsundari (1948), Mangal Fera (1948).

Her other films are Karyavar (Gujarati), Aankh ka Taara, Akhri Daku, Darinda, Ahuti, Naastik, Dillagi and Darwaza.

She regularly played the loving but conservative mother figure in the late 1960s through the late 1970s. Prominent roles of that time include films like Padosan, Johny Mera Naam, and Deewaar, among others.

== Personal life ==
She married sound recordist J. B. Jagtap in 1952, and took a break from acting for nine years. There are limited details available about her family and personal relationships. It is known that Dulari's career did not overshadow her commitment to her family, and she maintained a balance between her professional and personal responsibilities. She retired from acting in the 1980s and lived a quiet life thereafter.

== Death ==
She died in an old age home in Pune, Maharashtra, aged 84. She had been suffering from Alzheimer's disease, and was bedridden for over two years. Through the last years of her life Cine & TV Artistes Association (CINTAA) had started providing her financial assistance after veteran actress Waheeda Rehman brought up her case.

== Selected filmography ==
Year	Name of the movie	Role	Notes
1941	Bahen	as nurse in hospital	
1941	Apna Paraya		
1943	Hamari Baat		
1947	Bhookh		
1048	Gunsundari	Kusum	Gujarati film
1949	Mangalfera	Chandrika	Gujarati film, parallel lead
1951	Albela	Malti, Pyarelal's sister	
1953	Jeewan Jyoti		
1955	Devdas	Street Singer	
1957	Johnny Walker	Shobha	
1957	Paying Guest	Uma	
1961	Jab Pyar Kisi Se Hota Hai		
1961	Passport	Benny Dayal's Wife	
1963	Mujhe Jeene Do		
1966	Dil Diya Dard Liya		
1966	Anupama	Sarla	
1966	Aaye Din Bahar Ke		
1966	Teesri Kasam	Hiraman's sister-in-law	
1968	Saraswatichandra	Saraswati Chandra's step-mother	
1968	Padosan	Bhola's aunt	
1969	Pyar Ka Mausam		
1969	Intaquam		
1969	Chirag		
1969	Aya Sawan Jhoom Ke	Jugal Kishore's Wife	
1969	Aradhana	Doctor	
1970	Ganwaar	Gopal's Mother	
1970	Johny Mera Naam		
1970	Holi Ayee Re		
1971	Maryada		
1971	Aan Milo Sajna		
1971	Lal Patthar		
1971	Mera Gaon Mera Desh		
1971	Caravan		
1971	Elaan		
1972	Ek Nazar		
1972	Annadata		
1972	Zameen Aasmaan		
1972	Bombay to Goa		
1973	Barkha Bahar	Ganga's Mother	
1975	Do Jasoos	Sarita Devi Verma	
1975	Deewaar	Chander's Mother	
1976	Sankoch		
1976	Jeevan Jyoti	Ratna Chaurasia	
1976	Bajrangbali	Devi Ma Shabri	
1978	Ankh Ka Tara		
1978	Do Musafir	Bholi, Shambhu's Wife	
1978	Aakhri Daku		
1978	Dillagi		
1980	Aasha		
1980	Hum Paanch		
1981	Biwi-O-Biwi	Chander's Mother	
1984	John Jani Janardhan	Fatima Bi	
1984	Gangvaa		
1984	Karishmaa	Radha's Mother	
1985	Haqeeqat	Amar's Mother	
1986	Dilwaala		
1989	Suryaa: An Awakening	Ramu's Mother	
1990	Amba	Nani Maa	
1997	Ziddi		
