= Nasir Hussain =

Indian film director and screenwriter (1926–2002)

- Born: Mohammad Nasir Hussain Khan; 16 November 1926; Bhopal, India
- Died: 13 March 2002 (aged 75); Mumbai, Maharashtra, India
- Occupations: Filmmaker, screenwriter
- Years active: 1948–1996
- Spouse: Ayesha Khan
- Children: Mansoor Khan
- Relatives: See Khan–Hussain family

Mohammad Nasir Hussain Khan (16 November 1926 – 13 March 2002), better known as Nasir Hussain, was an Indian film producer, film director, and screenwriter. With a career spanning nearly half a century, Hussain has been credited as a major trendsetter in the history of Hindi cinema. For example, he directed Yaadon Ki Baraat (1973), which created the Hindi language masala film genre that defined Hindi cinema in the 1970s and 1980s, and he wrote and produced Qayamat Se Qayamat Tak (1988), which set the Hindi language musical romance template that defined Hindi cinema in the 1990s. Akshay Manwani wrote a book on Hussain's cinema titled Music, Masti, Modernity: The Cinema of Nasir Hussain.

== Early life ==
Hussain was born in Bhopal State on 16 November 1926 to Jaffar Hussain Khan, a schoolteacher who belonged to a zamindar family of Pashtun descent, and Aamna, who traced her Arab roots to Jeddah (modern-day Saudi Arabia) and was the niece of Maulana Azad, and he was the fourth of five children, the youngest being Tahir Hussain, the father of Aamir Khan.

== Personal life ==
He married Ayesha Khan, who pre-deceased him. Their son Mansoor Khan is a former film director and producer whose daughter is actress Zayn Marie Khan. The couple are the maternal grandparents of Imran Khan, a former film actor.

== Career ==
=== Early career ===
Hussain first worked with Qamar Jalalabadi when he joined Filmistan as a writer in 1948. The famous films he wrote for Filmistan include Anarkali (1953), Munimji (1955), and Paying Guest (1957). Filmistan was the breakaway studio from Bombay Talkies; it used mid-budget formula productions and sold on star value and music. Sashadhar Mukherjee was a part of the breakaway team, and he gave Hussain Tumsa Nahin Dekha to direct. The film made a star of Shammi Kapoor.

Kapoor and Hussain made another hit, Dil Deke Dekho (1959), for Filmalaya, the breakaway group of Filmistan. The film introduced Asha Parekh, who would be the lead in all of Hussain's films until Caravan (1971). He was also in a long romantic relationship with her, but it ended because he was already a married man with two children, and Parekh didn't want to be labeled a homewrecker. Hussain's wife was Margaret Francina Lewis, an assistant choreographer he met at Filmistan. They married and then she changed her name to Ayesha Khan. She worked as an assistant choreographer on some of his productions.

=== Own production ===
Hussain then set up Nasir Hussain Films and turned producer-director. He made musical hits like Jab Pyar Kisi Se Hota Hai (1961), Phir Wohi Dil Laya Hoon (1963), Teesri Manzil (1966), Baharon Ke Sapne (1967), Pyar Ka Mausam (1969), Caravan (1971), Yaadon Ki Baraat (1973), and Hum Kisise Kum Naheen (1977).

Hussain, Majrooh Sultanpuri, and R.D. Burman collaborated on Teesri Manzil, Baharon Ke Sapne, Pyar Ka Mausam, Caravan, Yaadon Ki Baraat and Hum Kisise Kum Naheen.

Hussain wrote and produced the musical cult hit Teesri Manzil. Vijay Anand directed the film, which starred Hussain's regular actors Shammi Kapoor and Asha Parekh. Originally Dev Anand was signed for the film but due to differences with Hussain he opted out and Kapoor was cast. He also hired R.D. Burman for the first time to compose the songs ("O Haseena Zulfonwali", "O Mere Sona Re", "Deewaana Mujhsa Nahin", "Tumne Mujhe Dekha", "Aaja Aaja Main Hoon Pyaar Tera"). After the songs became evergreen hits, Burman would compose for all of Hussain's films for the next 19 years, ending with Zabardast (1985).

Hussain's Yaadon Ki Baraat was written by Salim–Javed, who had written Zanjeer the same year. Both films dealt with the hero wanting to avenge his father's death, and both featured Ajit as the villain. Yaadon Ki Baraat has been identified as the first masala film.

=== Late career ===
As Zamane Ko Dikhana Hai (1981), Manzil Manzil (1984) and Zabardast (1985) all flopped, Hussain's son Mansoor took over the reins of Nasir Hussain Films, although Hussain continued to write scripts and dialogues for films like Qayamat Se Qayamat Tak (1988) and Jo Jeeta Wohi Sikander (1992). In Qayamat Se Qayamat Tak, he introduced his nephew Aamir Khan as a hero. Qayamat Se Qayamat Tak was a milestone in the history of Hindi cinema, setting the template for Hindi language musical romance films that defined Hindi cinema in the 1990s.

Hussain received a special Filmfare Award in 1996 for his contribution to Hindi cinema. Javed Akhtar rates Hussain as the most underrated producer/director of his generation and credits him with changing the career trajectory of Shammi Kapoor and Dev Anand.

== Death ==
Hussain died in Mumbai on 13 March 2002 following a heart attack. After his death, Asha Parekh stated in an interview that she had not seen him the last year of his life, as he became reclusive because of his wife's death.

== Associations ==
Hussain had several "favourites" with whom he worked repeatedly.

- The first was mentor Sashadhar Mukherjee, for whose Filmistan Studio Hussain wrote and directed his earlier films.
- Sashadhar's brother Subodh Mukherjee directed two films that Hussain wrote for Filmistan, Munimji and Paying Guest. Both films had Dev Anand as the hero and S.D. Burman as the music composer. Hussain cast Dev Anand in his own first production, Jab Pyar Kisi Se Hota Hai.
- Pran was also a constant villain in Ziddi, Love in Tokyo, Paying Guest and Phir Wohi Dil Laya Hoon.
- Hussain also produced a film and cast his mentor Sashadhar's son Joy Mukherjee in Phir Wohi Dil Laya Hoon.
- Hussain used Majrooh Sultanpuri in 10 of his productions, apart from working with him in Paying Guest.
- Hussain directed Shammi Kapoor in his early hits and created Shammi's image with films like Tumsa Nahin Dekha and Dil Deke Dekho as well as his later production Teesri Manzil.
- Actor Rajindernath was a fixture in almost all of his early productions. He was in Dil Deke Dekho (1959), Jab Pyar Kisise Hota Hai (1961), Phir Wohi Dil Laya Hoon (1963), Baharon Ke Sapne (1967), Pyar Ka Mausam (1969), Zabardast (1985) and Zamaane Ko Dikhana Hai (1981).
- One of his longest associations was with leading lady Asha Parekh, from Dil Deke Dekho, through Jab Pyar Kisise Hota Hai, Phir Wohi Dil Laya Hoon, Teesri Manzil, Baharon Ke Sapne, Pyar Ka Mausam until Caravan. After a gap of 13 years, she did a cameo in his film Manzil Manzil (1984).
- He worked with R.D. Burman in 9 films from Teesri Manzil, through Baharon Ke Sapne, Pyar Ka Mausam, Caravan, Yaadon Ki Baraat, Hum Kisise Kum Naheen, Zamane Ko Dikhana Hai, Manzil Manzil and Zabardast.
- Hussain also collaborated with writer Sachin Bhowmick, comic Wasti, and editors Babu Lavande and Gurudutt Shirali in many of his films.
- Hussain's wife was assistant choreographer Ayesha Khan and she worked on several of his films: Baharon Ke Sapne, Hum Kisise Kum Naheen.

== Awards and nominations ==
- Filmfare Best Movie Award – Qayamat Se Qayamat Tak (1988)
- Filmfare Best Screenplay Award – Qayamat Se Qayamat Tak (1988)
- Filmfare Best Movie Award – Jo Jeeta Wohi Sikandar (1992)
- Filmfare Special Award (1996)

== Filmography ==
As director

Year	Film	Notes
1957	Tumsa Nahin Dekha	Debut film as director
1959	Dil Deke Dekho	
1961	Jab Pyar Kisi Se Hota Hai	
1963	Phir Wohi Dil Laya Hoon	
1967	Baharon Ke Sapne	
1969	Pyar Ka Mausam	
1971	Caravan	
1973	Yaadon Ki Baaraat	
1973	Aangan	Story also
1977	Hum Kisise Kum Naheen	
1981	Zamane Ko Dikhana Hai	
1984	Manzil Manzil	
1985	Zabardast	

As producer

Year	Film	Notes
1961	Jab Pyar Kisi Se Hota Hai	Debut film as producer
1963	Phir Wohi Dil Laya Hoon	First colour production
1966	Teesri Manzil	
1967	Baharon Ke Sapne	Starred Rajesh Khanna
1969	Pyar Ka Mausam	
1973	Yaadon Ki Baaraat	
1977	Hum Kisise Kum Naheen	
1981	Zamane Ko Dikhana Hai	
1984	Manzil Manzil	
1988	Qayamat Se Qayamat Tak	Directed by Mansoor Khan
1992	Jo Jeeta Wohi Sikandar	Directed by Mansoor Khan

As writer for others

Year	Film	Notes
1953	Anarkali	Story
1954	Biraj Bahu	Dialogue
1955	Munimji	
1957	Paying Guest	
1973	Aangan	Story, screenplay and dialogue
