= Jeewan Jyoti (1953 film) =

- Poster
- Directed by: Mahesh Kaul
- Written by: Mahesh Kaul; G. D. Madgulkar
- Starring: Shammi Kapoor; Chand Usmani; Shashikala
- Cinematography: Dwarka Divecha; Anwar Pabani
- Edited by: Sri Anekar; M. S. Haji
- Music by: S. D. Burman
- Production company: Musical Pictures
- Release date: 1953
- Running time: 98 min
- Country: India
- Language: Hindi

Jeewan Jyoti is a 1953 Indian Hindi-language romance drama film directed by Mahesh Kaul. It is the debut film of the lead actors Shammi Kapoor and Chand Usmani.

== Cast ==
- Shammi Kapoor as Shyam Sundar
- Chand Usmani as Kishori
- Shashikala as Leela
- Leela Mishra as Ganga
- Dulari as Jamna
- Nazir Hussain as Dr. Abdul Hamid
- Moni Chatterjee as Master Dinanath
- S. N. Banerjee as Chhote Lal
- Amir Banoo
- Jagadish Kadar

== Soundtrack ==
Song	Singer	Raga
"Sari Khushiyan Sath Aayi"	Shamshad Begum	
"Tum Se Mori Lag Gayi Ankhiyan, Hay Ram"	Mohammed Rafi, Geeta Dutt	Multani
"So Ja Re So Ja" – 1	Geeta Dutt	
"So Ja Re So Ja" – 2	Lata Mangeshkar	
"Chhayi Kari Badariya"	Lata Mangeshkar	
"Man Sheetal, Naina Suphal"	Lata Mangeshkar	
"Koi Aanewala Hai"	Asha Bhosle	
"Balma Ne Man Har Li Na"	Asha Bhosle	
