= Tumsa Nahin Dekha (1957 film) =

- Theatrical release poster
- Directed by: Nasir Hussain
- Written by: Nasir Hussain
- Screenplay by: Nasir Hussain
- Story by: Nasir Hussain
- Produced by: Shashadhar Mukherjee
- Starring: Shammi Kapoor; Ameeta; Pran
- Cinematography: Marshall Braganza
- Edited by: Babu Lavande
- Music by: O. P. Nayyar
- Production company: Filmistan Pvt. Ltd.
- Distributed by: Filmistan; Ultra
- Release date: 1957
- Running time: 141 minutes
- Country: India
- Language: Hindi
- Box office: ₹1 crore (US$100,000)

Tumsa Nahin Dekha (English: Saw nobody like you) is a 1957 Indian Hindi language romance drama film, produced by Sashadhar Mukherjee and written and directed by Nasir Hussain, of Filmistan Pvt. Ltd. The film marked Hussain's evolution into a director. He had written films such as Munimji and Paying Guest.

The film was conceived as a star vehicle for its heroine Ameeta, who was the protégée of Filmistan Studios owner Tolaram Jalan. Much care was taken with her make-up, wardrobe and lighting. Much of the film's extensive publicity was also built around the actress.

The film's huge success at the box office made the then-struggling Shammi Kapoor an overnight sensation instead. This was the film in which he developed his own individual look and youthful style, and was his first light-hearted musical and its success helped move him to acting in this genre. The film also stars the popular villain and character actor Pran. Its music is by O.P. Nayyar and lyrics by Majrooh Sultanpuri.

The film was originally offered to Dev Anand but he declined, due to which Shammi Kapoor was cast. However, the director Nasir Hussain was in a quandary as he had already read the script to Dev Anand and Vyjayanthimala, but Mukherjee prevailed and he also replaced Vyjayanthimala with Ameeta, who was the protégée of Filmistan Studios owner Tolaram Jalan. The film's original lyricist was Sahir, who wrote the title song, but he too opted out and Majrooh Sultanpuri took his place.

== Plot ==
Twenty years ago, after killing his friend, Sardar Rajpal had fled from his hometown in Shillong and re-located to the rural area of Assam along with his adopted daughter Meena. Twenty years later, he messages his wife Kamla, to send their son Shankar to him, so that he can employ him and get him married to Meena. Shankar arrives and he is welcomed by Sardar, who employs him and introduces him to Meena. A few days later, another young man shows up at his door claiming to be Kamla's son. A baffled Sardar also welcomes him, and puts both the young men under observation in order to find who the real Shankar is. The question remains: why would anyone want to impersonate Shankar, and what will happen to Sardar himself after the Police catch up with him for killing his friend 20 years ago?

== Cast ==
- Shammi Kapoor as Shankar Bhat
- Ameeta as Meena
- Pran as Sohan
- Raj Mehra as Vishnu
- B. M. Vyas as Gopal / Sardar Rajpal
- Sheela Vaz as Seema
- Kanu Roy as Bhola
- M. B. Shetty as Bhola's henchman
- Ram Avtar as Johnny
- Shilendra Kumar Singh as Shankar's chacha (uncle)
- Anjali Devi as Kamla
- Rajendra
- S. L. Puri
- Harbans Darshan M. Arora as Amarnath
- Tina Misquitta as Actress
- Bela Bose as a dancer in song 'Aaye he door se'

== Soundtrack ==
Tumsa Nahin Dekha

Soundtrack album by O. P. Nayyar
- Released: 10 December 1957
- Genre: Film soundtrack
- Label: Saregama

O. P. Nayyar chronology
Naya Daur (1957)	Tumsa Nahin Dekha (1957)	Howrah Bridge (1958)

Song	Singer	Lyricist
"Tumsa Nahin Dekha" (Female)	Asha Bhosle	Sahir Ludhianvi (uncredited)
"Tumsa Nahin Dekha" (Male)	Mohammed Rafi	Sahir Ludhianvi (uncredited)
"Jawaniyan Yeh Mast Mast"	Mohammed Rafi	Majrooh Sultanpuri
"Chhupnewale Samne Aa"	Mohammed Rafi	Majrooh Sultanpuri
"Aaye Hai Door Se, Milne Huzoor Se"	Asha Bhosle, Mohammed Rafi	Majrooh Sultanpuri
"Dekho Kasam Se Kehte Hai Tumse Haan"	Asha Bhosle, Mohammed Rafi	Majrooh Sultanpuri
"Sar Par Topi Lal, Haath Mein Resham Ka Rumal"	Asha Bhosle, Mohammed Rafi	Majrooh Sultanpuri
