= Paying Guest =

- Film poster
- Directed by: Subodh Mukherjee
- Written by: Nasir Hussain
- Screenplay by: Nasir Hussain
- Story by: Subodh Mukherjee
- Produced by: Sashadhar Mukherjee
- Starring: Dev Anand; Nutan; Shubha Khote
- Cinematography: Dronacharya
- Edited by: D. N. Pai (Supervising); Babu Lavande
- Music by: S. D. Burman
- Production company: Filmalaya
- Distributed by: Filmistan Ltd.
- Release date: 1957
- Running time: 157 minutes
- Country: India
- Language: Hindi

Paying Guest is a 1957 Bollywood Romance drama film directed by Subodh Mukherjee. The film stars Dev Anand and Nutan along with Shubha Khote.

The soundtrack, composed by Sachin Dev Burman, received a degree of popularity and made a lasting impression. The lyrics were written by Majrooh Sultanpuri. Paying Guest was the second hit film of the team of Mukherjee, Hussain, Dev Anand and S. D. Burman, who had combined two years earlier to make the successful Munimji.

== Plot ==
An incompetent lawyer Ramesh (Dev Anand) keeps on getting evicted as a tenant due his to failure to pay rent. He then dons the guise of an old man to gain entry in a house as a tenant and falls for the landlord's daughter Shanti (Nutan), whose best friend Chanchal (Shubha Khote) marries a famous barrister Dayal (Gajanan Jagirdar) for money and who is of her father's age. After marriage Chanchal becomes Shanti's neighbour. Dissatisfied with her marital life, Chanchal becomes jealous of Shanti and Ramesh's love. Shanti's older sister's rake and ruffian husband Prakash threatens Shanti's father to send him money or else he would come to his house. Ramesh is unable to pay the house rent and Shanti gives him the money her father had given her for monthly expenditure. When Ramesh gives Shanti's father the money that Shanti had given him, he is ready to send it to his son-in-law as money order so as to prevent him from coming to his home. Shanti dissuades him from doing so saying that she will do it. However, since there is no spare money, she fails to send the money to her brother-in-law. In the meantime, Prakash with his wife reaches Shanti's father's house and in an altercation, Prakash pushes Shanti's father and since he was frail, he subsequently dies. Shanti's elder sister also falls ill and Shanti gives her brother-in-law her gold bangles to get medicine but Prakash squanders the money on liquor. Ramesh has no income and Chanchal suggests to Shanti that she pick up a job. Shanti gets employed in a theatre. Meanwhile, Chanchal tries to entice Ramesh and gets him a job under her husband. Prakash, for want of money, allies with Chanchal and conspires to pull Ramesh and Shanti apart. Ramesh is made to drink by Chanchal during a party, and after the party, Dayal sees a drunken Ramesh and Chanchal in his own house together and changes his Will disowning Chanchal. Prakash, who surreptitiously enters their house, sees the rewriting of the Will and steals the Will. Dayal accuses Chanchal of misdemeanour but Chanchal somehow convinces him to take a break to a lakeside resort. Chanchal connives with Prakash to have Dayal removed and drowns Dayal in the lake. Prakash keeps blackmailing Chanchal over the Will and Dayal's murder and on one such occasion, Shanti sees shadows of someone strangling Chanchal. She reaches Chanchal's place only to find Prakash roughing up Chanchal. On seeing Shanti Prakash starts shooting her. Shanti runs to the outhouse of Chanchal's bungalow and disarms Prakash and threatens to shoot him. A shot is fired and Prakash is killed. Shanti confesses to the crime and is produced in front of the court on a charge of murdering Prakash. All top lawyers of the town refuse to take up her case. Finally, Ramesh becomes her lawyer. Will he be able to save his beloved from the gallows?

== Cast ==
- Dev Anand as Advocate Ramesh Kumar
- Nutan as Shanti
- Shubha Khote as Chanchal
- Gajanan Jagirdar as Barrister Dayal
- Sajjan as Jagat
- Dulari as Uma
- Yakub as Prakash

== Music ==
The music of the film is composed by S. D. Burman and lyrics by Majrooh Sultanpuri.

Song	Singer	Raga
"Hay Hay, Yeh Nigahen"	Kishore Kumar	
"Mana Janab Ne Pukara"	Kishore Kumar	Bhairavi (Hindustani)
"Chhod Do Aanchal, Zamana Kya Kahega"	Kishore Kumar, Asha Bhosle	
"O Nigahen Mastana, Dekh Sama Hai Suhana"	Kishore Kumar, Asha Bhosle	
"Chand Phir Nikla"	Lata Mangeshkar	Shuddh Kalyan
"Chupke Chupke"	Lata Mangeshkar	
"Gaaye Ghabraye Ke"	Geeta Dutt	
