= Laash =

- Directed by: D. Mansukhlal
- Written by: Basir Babbar
- Produced by: K. Mansukhlal
- Starring: Yunus Parvez; Lalita Pawar; Shakti Kapoor; Rakesh Bedi
- Music by: Usha Khanna
- Production company: Sonal films
- Release date: 6 February 1998
- Country: India
- Language: Hindi

Laash (The dead body) is a low budget Hindi horror film directed and produced by K. Mansukhlal. This film was released on 6 February 1998 under the banner of Sonal films.

== Plot ==
There was a haunted house in which there stays a ghost of a woman who kills everybody who tries to stay in that house.

== Cast ==
- Lalita Pawar
- Shakti Kapoor
- Rakesh Bedi
- Yunus Parvez
- Sonika Gill
- Rajinder Nath
- Chandni Gupta
- Kirti Rawal
- Raja Duggal
- Asha Sharma
