= Aangan (1973 film) =

- Directed by: Nazir Hussain
- Written by: Nazir Hussain
- Produced by: Jagdish Massand and Pratap Kumar
- Edited by: Nazir Hussain
- Music by: Sonik Omi
- Production company: J. P. Films
- Release date: 25 January 1973
- Country: India
- Language: Hindi

Aangan is a 1973 Bollywood family drama film directed by Nazir Hussain. It stars Farida Jalal, Deb Mukherjee, Indrani Mukherjee, Ashim Kumar, Dilip Raj, Leela Mishra and Nazir Hussain. The film revolves around two brothers and the misunderstandings caused by the younger brother's wife.

Hussain wrote the story, screenplay and dialogue for the film aside from directing it, for producers Jagdish Massand and Pratap Kumar, who produced the film under the J. P. Films banner. The music of the film was composed by the music director duo Sonik-Omi, with lyrics by Indeevar.

== Plot ==
The story is about two brothers leading a contented life in a joint family. The older one is married and he and his wife look after the younger brother as their own son. Misunderstandings occur when the younger one marries and brings his wife to live in the joint family. The younger brother's wife disturbs the equilibrium of the family maintained by the older brother and his wife. Finally, the disagreements are sorted out with the family living together cohesively.

== Cast ==
- Deb Mukherjee
- Farida Jalal
- Indrani Mukherjee
- Nazir Hussain
- Ashim Kumar
- Leela Mishra
- Tun Tun
- Jayshree T.
- Dilip Raj

== Music ==
Song list:

Song	Singer
"Jab Talak Asman Pe Sitare Rahenge"	Sulakshana Pandit, Mukesh
"Madira Hi Madira Tere Badan Me"	Asha Bhosle, Mukesh
"Holi Hai Rang De Kanha Ho Mujhe"	Asha Bhosle, Manna Dey
"Makhan Se Bhi Chikna Badan"	Asha Bhosle, Chandrani Mukherjee
"Khatre Jo Uthayega Tab Ho To Kuch Jaayega"	Asha Bhosle
