= Munimji =

- Poster
- Directed by: Subodh Mukherjee
- Written by: Nasir Hussain
- Produced by: Sashadhar Mukherjee
- Starring: Dev Anand; Nalini Jaywant; Pran; Ameeta; Nazir Hussain; Nirupa Roy
- Music by: S.D. Burman; Sahir Ludhianvi (lyricist); Shailendra (lyricist)
- Release date: August 5, 1955
- Country: India
- Language: Hindi

Munimji (transl. Clerk) is a 1955 Indian Hindi-language romantic comedy film starring Dev Anand and Nalini Jaywant, and directed by Subodh Mukherjee. While the story idea was by Ranjan, the actual story and screenplay was written by Nasir Hussain who, also co-wrote the dialogues alongside Qamar Jalalabadi. Pran played the villain in the film. It also starred Ameeta and Nirupa Roy. The team of Mukherjee, Nasir Hussain, Dev Anand and music director S.D. Burman later got together to produce another movie, Paying Guest, in 1957. The film was loosely adapted in Telugu as Inti Guttu (1958).

== Plot ==
The whole film

Roopa lives a wealthy lifestyle with her widowed dad, Captain Suresh, and brother, Shekhar. After she returns from abroad, she is told that she must now prepare to marry her betrothed, Ratan, who is the son of a close friend of Suresh.

Everything changes suddenly when Roopa meets a handsome young man, Raj, and they fall in love with each other. Raj then breaks her heart when he tells her that his mother, Malti, who works as a maidservant in Suresh's household, has always favored Ratan over him and has made him promise to step out of Ratan's way. Before she can find out why Malti prefers Ratan over Raj, a bandit, Kala Ghoda, who has been terrorizing the region, asks Suresh to pay Rs.50,000. The police lay a trap for this extortionist and capture him red-handed. He turns out to be none other than Suresh's Munim. Surprises are in store for everyone when they find out that Munim is Raj, who has been masquerading as the Munim for many years and may have embezzled another Rs.50,000. Now, the questions arise who is Raj? What is his profession? Is he really masquerading as Kala Ghoda?

== Cast ==
- Dev Anand as Amar alias Raj
- Nalini Jaywant as Roopa
- Nirupa Roy as Malti
- Pran as Rattan
- Ameeta as Bela
- Madan Mohan (music director) as Shekhar

== Soundtrack ==
The music of the film is composed by S. D. Burman and lyrics by Sahir Ludhianvi and Shailendra.

The song "Jeevan Ke Safar Mein Rahi Milte Hai Bichhad Jane Ko..." sung by Kishore Kumar, became a super hit. While the film had a happy and sad version of this song in the voices of Kishore Kumar and Lata Mangeshkar respectively, Kishore Kumar also sang a live sad snippet version of this song with different lyrics several years later at the time of S. D. Burman's death in 1975, lasting about a minute but having no music at all.

Munimji

Soundtrack album by S.D. Burman
- Released: 1955
- Label: Saregama

Song	Singer(s)	Lyricist	Raga
"Dil Ki Umangen Hain Jawan, Rang Mein Dooba Hai Sama..."	Hemant Kumar, Geeta Dutt and Thakur Desai	Sahir Ludhianvi	
"Jeevan Ke Safar Mein Rahi..." (Happy)	Kishore Kumar	Sahir Ludhianvi	
"Jeevan Ke Safar Mein Rahi..." (Sad)	Lata Mangeshkar	Sahir Ludhianvi	
"Ek Nazar Bas Ek Nazar..."	Lata Mangeshkar	Sahir Ludhianvi	
"Aankh Khulte Hi Tum Chhup Gaye Ho Kahan..."	Lata Mangeshkar	Sahir Ludhianvi	
"Ghayal Hiraniya Main Ban Ban Doloon..."	Lata Mangeshkar	Shailendra	Kafi
"Nain Khoye Khoye Tere Dil Mein Bhi Kuch Hoye..."	Lata Mangeshkar	Shailendra	
"Ik Taraf Haseen Jalwe Hain..."	Geeta Dutt	Shailendra	
"De Diya Toh Le Le Dil..."	Geeta Dutt	Shailendra	
"O Shiv Ji Bihane Chale Palki..."	Hemant Kumar	Shailendra	
