= Asha Parekh =

Indian actress (born 1942)

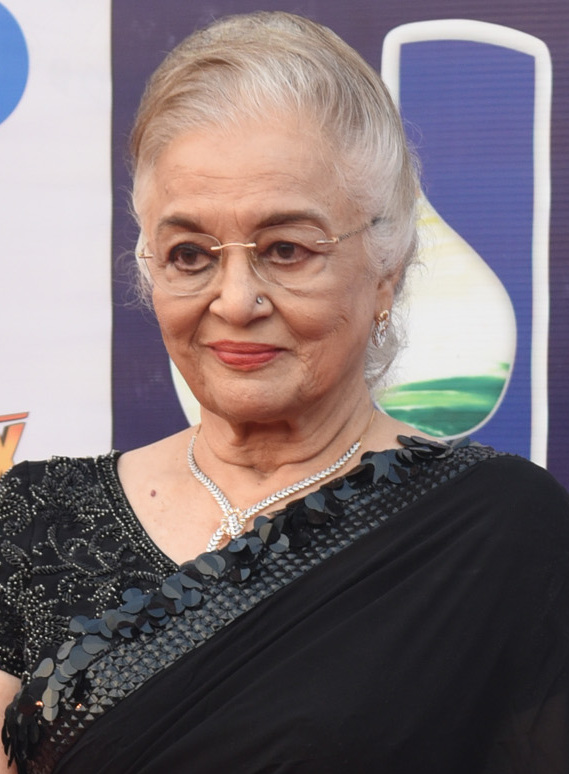
- Asha Parekh in 2022
- Born: 2 October 1942 (age 84); Santa Cruz, Mumbai, India
- Occupations: Actress; director; producer
- Years active: 1952–2008
- Works: Full list
- Honours: Padma Shri (1992); Dadasaheb Phalke Award (2020)

Asha Parekh (born 2 October 1942) is an Indian actress, film director and producer who has worked in more than 85 films in a career that has spanned over 40 years. In 1992, she was honoured with the Padma Shri by the Government of India for her contribution to the field of cinema and was honoured with Dadasaheb Phalke Award in 2020.

Parekh made her acting debut as a child in Maa (1952). As an adult, she appeared in Dil Deke Dekho (1959) and starred in several films in the 1960s and 1970, including Jab Pyar Kisi Se Hota Hai (1961), Bharosa (1963), Ziddi (1964), Mere Sanam (1965), Teesri Manzil (1966), Love in Tokyo (1966), Do Badan (1966), Aaye Din Bahar Ke (1966), Upkar (1967), Kanyadaan (1968), Shikar (1968), Aya Sawan Jhoom Ke (1969), Sajan (1969), Chirag (1969), Aan Milo Sajna (1971), Kati Patang (1971), Mera Gaon Mera Desh (1971), Caravan (1971), Samadhi (1972), Heera (1973), Udhar Ka Sindur (1976), Main Tulsi Tere Aangan Ki (1978) and Kaalia (1981).

She won a Filmfare Award for Best Actress, and was honoured with the Filmfare Lifetime Achievement Award in 2002. Her autobiography, The Hit Girl, was published in 2017.

== Early life ==
Asha Parekh was born on 2 October 1942 in Santa Cruz, Mumbai. Her mother, Sudha "Salma" Lakdawala, a Bohri Muslim, and her father, Bachubhai Parekh, a Gujarati Hindu, met while studying at Fergusson College in Pune. Lakdawala was a freedom fighter and participated in India's struggle for independence. She was briefly incarcerated for protesting against the British colonial rule while pregnant with Parekh.

Growing up, Parekh wanted to be a doctor but changed her mind after witnessing a train accident. She was also interested in dance from a young age, and veteran actor Prem Nath, while visiting Mukul Anand's family next door, was impressed by her abilities. He then asked Kathak-dancer Mohanlal Pandey to train Parekh for an upcoming performance at St. Xavier's College, Mumbai where director Bimal Roy first saw her. He would go on to cast Parekh as a child actor in the film Maa (1952).

== Career ==
=== 1952–1956: Early work as a child actor ===
Parekh started her career as a child actor at ten years old, appearing in Maa (1952) under the screen name Baby Asha Parekh. She was also seen in Aasman (1952), Shri Chaitanya Mahaprabhu (1953), Baap Beti (1954), Dhobi Doctor (1954), Ayodhyapati (1956), Aasha (1956) and Ustaad (1956). Parekh played a supporting role in Jwala (1971) that began shooting in 1956 but experienced production delays due to Madhubala's prevailing sickness. After Baap Beti was unsuccessful at the box office, Parekh decided to step away from acting and resumed her schooling.

=== 1959–1990: Rise to Stardom ===
At sixteen, Parekh tried to dabble in acting again, but was rejected from Vijay Bhatt's Goonj Uthi Shehnai (1959) in favour of actress Ameeta, because the filmmaker claimed she was not "star material". Eight days later, producer Subodh Mukherjee and writer-director Nasir Hussain cast her in Dil Deke Dekho (1959) opposite Shammi Kapoor. The film was the beginning of Parekh's long-standing association with Hussain, who went on to work with her in six more films: Jab Pyar Kisi Se Hota Hai (1961), Phir Wohi Dil Laya Hoon (1963), Teesri Manzil (1966), Baharon Ke Sapne (1967), Pyar Ka Mausam (1969), and Caravan (1971). Hussain was also the distributor of 21 of her films including Baharon Ke Sapne (1967). After Dil Deke Dekho, she was cast in Ramanand Sagar's Ghunghant (1960), an adaptation of Rabindranath Tagore's Noukadubi. She also appeared in Gharana (1961) featuring Rajendra Kumar and Raaj Kumar, and Chhaya (1961) alongside Sunil Dutt and Nirupa Roy. The film, including the song Hum Insaan Nahi by Mohammad Rafi, received positive reviews from the critics.

She starred in Ziddi (1964), Mere Sanam (1965), Love In Tokyo (1966), Aaye Din Bahaar Ke (1966) and Upkar (1967), all of which were successful at the box office. She also worked with director Raj Khosla on Do Badan (1966), Chirag (1969) for which she earned a nomination for the Filmfare Award for Best Actress, and Main Tulsi Tere Aangan Ki (1978) for which she earned a nomination for the Filmfare Award for Best Supporting Actress. In a BBC interview, Parekh said that until Do Badan she was considered a "glamour girl" but her performance in the film established her as a "good actor." She worked with director Shakti Samanta on Pagla Kahin Ka (1970) and Kati Patang (1970) for which she won her first and only Filmfare Award for Best Actress. She also played a supporting role in Udhar Ka Sindur (1976) for which she was nominated a second time for the Filmfare Award for Best Supporting Actress.

During this time, Parekh also worked in three Gujarati films, including Akhand Saubhagyavati (1963) and Kulvadhu (1977). She also appeared in two Punjabi films, Kankan De Ohle (1971) opposite Dharmendra and Lambhardarni (1976) with Dara Singh, as well as the Kannada film Sharavegada Saradara (1989). She starred in Kaalia (1981), her only film opposite Amitabh Bachchan and had a guest appearance in Hussain's 1984 film Manzil Manzil (1984).

=== 1990s: Directorial debut and other endeavours ===
After Kaalia, Parekh pivoted to television and directed a Gujarati-language show Jyoti (1988–1989). She started Akruti, the production company behind Palash ke Phool (1989–1990), Baaje Payal, Kora Kagaz (1998–2002) and Dal Mein Kaala (1998–1999).

From 1994 to 2000, Parekh was the president of the Cine and TV Artistes' Association (CINTAA) which was headed by actor Amjad Khan. In 1991, Parekh, along with Dilip Kumar, Sunil Dutt, Mithun Chakraborty and Amjad Khan, formed the Cine Artiste Welfare Trust to provide financial and medical assistance to deserving members of the Association. Parekh, Sunil Dutt, Amrish Puri, Chandrashekhar, and Dara Singh were on the Board of Trustees of the Trust. In 2011, when Times of India columnist Bharathi Dubey wrote about the ailing Indian actor and freedom fighter A.K. Hangal, Parekh and director Vipul Shah came forward to support his medical expenses.

Between 1998 and 2001, she became the first woman to be appointed as the chairperson of the Central Board of Film Certification (CBFC).

==== Controversies during CBFC tenure ====
Within days of assuming her position at CBFC, there was a controversy regarding Deepa Mehta's Fire (1996). The film released overseas in 1996, receiving critical acclaim at several international film festivals, and was released in India two years later. Protests were held outside the cinemas screening the film, with people claiming Fire was "alien to Indian culture" and calling for a ban. In her memoir, Parekh said the film portrayed "the bold theme of same-gender love between two women" aesthetically and without sensationalism. "There was no reason to ban it at all or delete a kissing scene between Shabana Azmi and Nandita Das," she wrote, "Sanjivani Kutti (regional manager of CBFC) and I stuck to the collective decision, the censors would not recall the film for a second opinion."

In 1998, Ronnie Mendonca, Mumbai's commissioner of police, requested Parekh to allow preemptive screening of films by the Maharashtra police before CBFC issues them a censor certificate. Parekh agreed to the proposal, and asked Mukesh and Mahesh Bhatt's Zakhm (1998) to be cleared with senior police officers before cinematic release. CBFC believed this to be "a cautionary measure" assuming that the depiction of communal riots in the film might cause a public backlash. The director-duo was unhappy with the decision, with Mukesh saying the matter be discussed with L.K. Advani, the then Minister of Home Affairs. Much back-and-forth ensued. The film was eventually released after minor cuts were imposed and "visuals indicating the party affiliations of the rioters were blurred." In the same year, CBFC cleared Bombay Boys (1998) for release after twenty audio and video cuts. Later, Mumbai Youth Association called for Parekh's resignation over the release of both Zakhm and Bombay Boys.

For Parekh, Shekhar Kapur's Elizabeth (1998) was the next "storm in a teacup." After CBFC suggested a few cuts and certified the film as 'Adults Only,' Kapur challenged her to a public debate in an open letter published in The Times of India. He insisted on a 'UA' certification for universal exhibition, and took the case to appellate tribunal; Justice Bhaktavar Lentin ruled in Kapur's favour.

Parekh agreed with the members of censorship committee on deleting one of the songs featured in Saawan Kumar Tak's Mother (1999). The song, Biwi Hai Cheez Sajawat Ki (A wife is meant to be a decorative object) picturised on Rekha, was deemed "offensive" and "insulting to women." The decision was supported by the Central Government. According to Parekh, a disgruntled Tak "raised a hue and cry" against the censorship in media interviews.

In the case of Chori Chori Chupke Chupke (2001), the Ministry requested Parekh to screen the film personally. The producer refused to make the print available, and a legal notice was left at his office door. Finally, a screening was arranged and several instances of double entendre dialogue were deleted. It was widely reported that the film, starring Preity Zinta, Salman Khan and Rani Mukerji, was financed by the Mumbai underworld elements. The Central Bureau of Investigation seized several prints of the film, and a formal investigation was launched. Parekh believed that the charges did not fall within the purview of the CBFC, and the film was released after a few cuts.

In her memoir, Parekh stated her aim as the CBFC chairperson was to only censor excessive vulgarity and violence, degradation of women, and use of non-essential abusive-language. "I had to strike a balance between carrying out the responsibilities as stated in the censorship guidelines and the filmmaker's right to freedom of expression," she said, "I was neither radical nor a dictator."

=== 2008–present: Later years and autobiography ===
In 2008, she was a judge on the Channel 9X reality show Tyohaar Dhamaaka. In 2017, her autobiography, co-written by Khalid Mohamed, titled The Hit Girl was published by Om Books International.

== Personal life ==
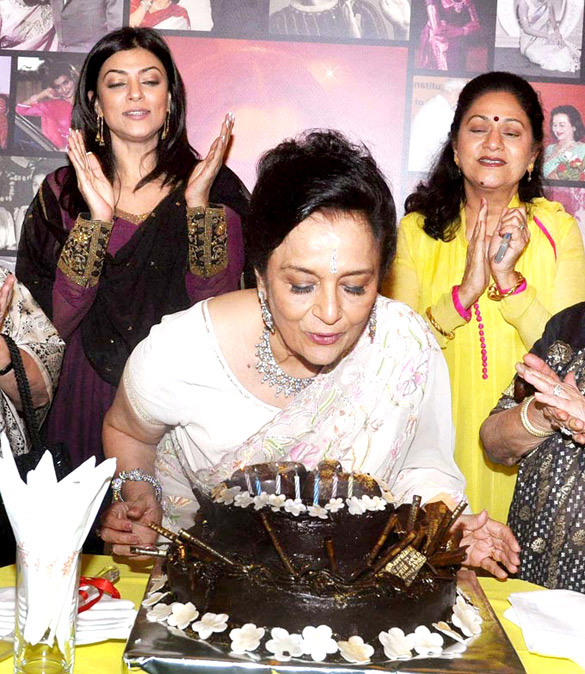
Parekh celebrating her 70th birthday with Sushmita Sen and Aruna Irani

Parekh has never married. At an event in 2017, she said that for her, "a good marriage mattered more than just getting married," as she didn't want to "marry just for the sake of having that title."

In her memoir, Parekh confirmed a relationship with director Nasir Hussain who was married to Ayesha Khan and had two children. While she considered him to be the "only man she ever loved," Parekh did not persuade Hussain for marriage to avoid being a "home breaker" and "[traumatising] his children." She has alluded to the absence of any ill-will between her and Hussain's family; his children, Nusrat and Imran, attended her book launch. After Hussain's death in 2002, Parekh recalled that she had not been in touch with him during the last year of his life, as he had become reclusive, but did speak to him before his demise.

Parekh almost married a US-based Indian professor before he confessed to having a girlfriend and the wedding plans fell through. Following her mother's advice, she explored arranged marriage prospects, but didn't find the "right kind of man" and felt "put off by the whole premise of marriage." She tried to adopt a child suffering from congenial defects, who "triggered a fervent maternal instinct" in her, but the doctors refused. "They asked me to select another child, but my love for this child I didn't even know was unrelenting and I was adamant on adopting only him," she told Verve Magazine. Her mother experienced a stroke soon after, and Parekh became occupied with caretaking. "I was very attached to [my mother] and the very notion of having another being to care for besides her then seemed inconceivable," she said.

Parekh is close with fellow-actors Nargis Rabadi, Helen, Waheeda Rehman, and Saira Banu.

As of 2025, Parekh dedicates her time to her dance academy Kara Bhavan. She established Bhikhubai Chandulal Jalundwala (BCJ) General Hospital and Asha Parekh Research Centre, also known as Asha Parekh Hospital, in Santacruz, Mumbai to honour her mother who died of cancer in September 1990. The 120-bed hospital was run by a Trust, and tended to 300 patients a day. It first closed in 2007 after the employees went on strike demanding a higher salary and reinstatement of five unfairly-dismissed staff members. In 2009, Suketu Shah, CEO of BCJ General Hospital announced that the hospital will reopen in March of that year. The hospital was closed again in 2018 owing to financial losses. Confirming the news, Parekh said the Trust "entered a joint venture to redevelop the building for a new hospital." In 2024, Shalby Hospitals, a multispecialty hospital franchise, acquired a thirty-year lease for running the BCJ General Hospital. The company announced that they are in the process of formalising a lease agreement with the Trust, and securing necessary permissions to construct a new 175-bedded facility.

After her mother's death, Parekh sold her Juhu bungalow and moved to an apartment to take care of her ailing father who died a few months later. In a Press Trust of India interview, she admitted to struggling with depression and suicidal thoughts following the death of both her parents.

== Artistry and legacy ==
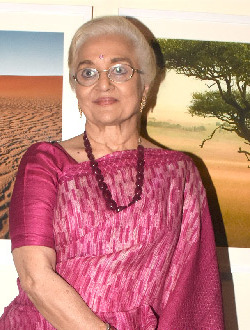
Parekh at an event in 2019

Parekh is regarded as one of the most accomplished actors of Hindi cinema. In 2022, she was placed in Outlook India's "75 Best Bollywood Actresses" list. One of the highest paid of late 1960s to early 1970s, Parekh appeared in Box Office India's "Top Actresses" list seven times, from 1966 to 1972 and topped the list thrice (1967–1969). In 2022, at 53rd International Film Festival of India, a retrospective was organised in her honour, where three of her films were screened. In her honour, Parekh's hand-print was unveiled at Walk of the Stars at Bandra Bandstand.

Farhana Farook of Filmfare said that "she's undeniably distinct from her peers" and noted, "Asha Parekh has gone way beyond the paradigm of stardom and its engulfing halo. She's a woman of many shades and much substance." Gautam Chintamani of Firstpost termed Parekh as "one of the biggest film stars to grace the silver screen". Outlook India noted, "Parekh was famed for her electrifying dance moves and the films that resulted from them." The Statesman noted, "Parekh earned the epithet of Bollywood's "jubilee girl" with her string of hits in the Hindi film industry's golden era." Arushi Jain of The Indian Express noted, "Parekh was associated with adjectives like effervescent, fashionista, cheerful, dancer and glamour girl. She struggled a lot to graduate from a conventional Bollywood heroine to one of the most sought after leading ladies of the 1960s with unconventional roles."

== Awards and nominations ==
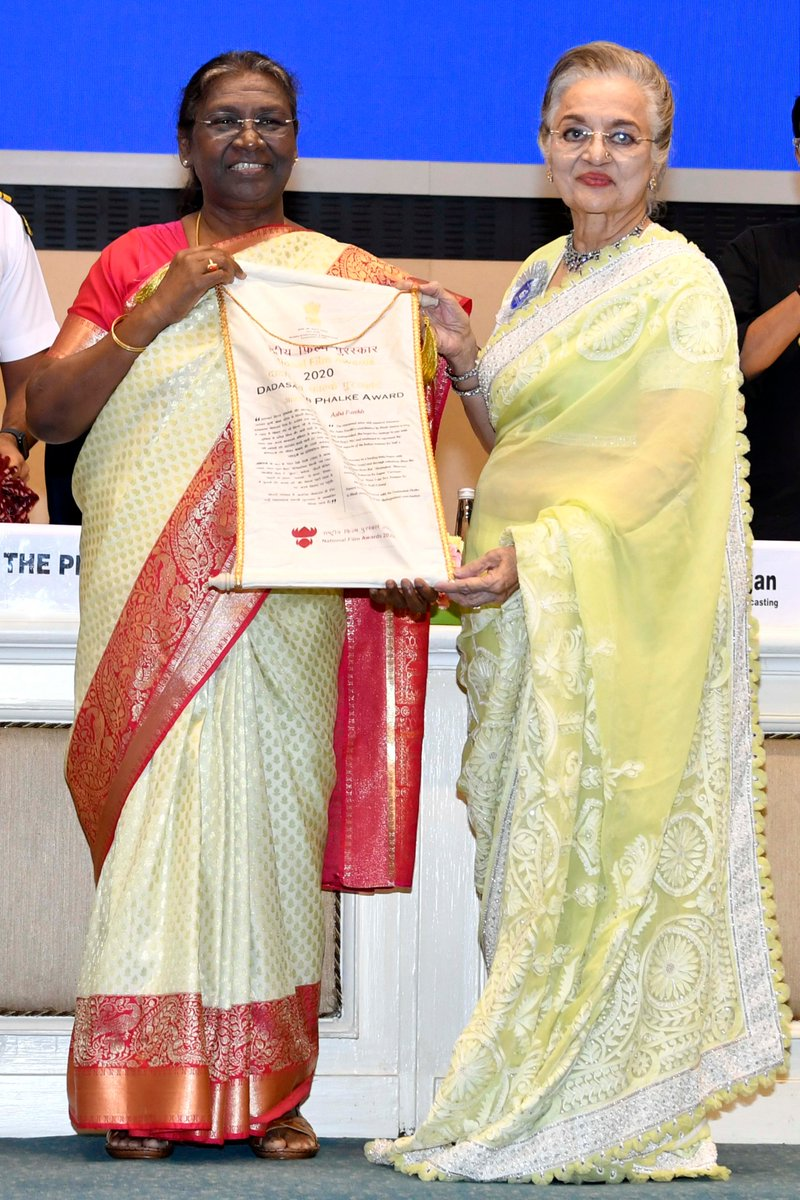
Parekh receiving the Dadasaheb Phalke Award for the year 2020

Parekh received the Filmfare Lifetime Achievement Award in 2002. She has continued to receive other Lifetime Achievement Awards: the Kalakar Award in 2004; the International Indian Film Academy Awards in 2006; the Pune International Film Festival Award in 2007; and the Ninth Annual Bollywood Award in Long Island, New York in 2007. She received the Living Legend Award from the Federation of Indian Chambers of Commerce & Industry (FICCI).

In 2016, Nitin Gadkari, Union Minister for Road Transport and Highways, said that Parekh had approached him at his Mumbai residence, climbing 12 floors of steps, to recommend her name for the Padma Bhushan, the third-highest civilian award. The claim was widely reported, however Parekh said she never lobbied for the award, and refused to say more on the matter. In her memoir The Hit Girl published a year later, Parekh said that meeting the minister was the "worst mistake" of her life. She said she had been hurt by the minister's claim, and recounted a different version of the event. Parekh had been awarded the Padma Shri in 1992. A close friend had arranged a meeting with the minister and suggested her to seek an upgrade of the award.

A chronological listing of awards and nominations is as follows:

1. Won – Gujarat State Award for Best Actress for Akhand Saubhagyavati (1963)
2. Nominated – Filmfare Award for Best Actress for Chirag (1969)
3. Won – Filmfare Award for Best Actress for Kati Patang (1971)
4. Nominated – Filmfare Award for Best Supporting Actress for Udhar Ka Sindur (1976)
5. Nominated – Filmfare Award for Best Supporting Actress for Main Tulsi Tere Aangan Ki (1978)
6. Padma Shri awarded in the Arts (1992)
7. Filmfare Lifetime Achievement Award (2002)
8. Indian Motion Picture Producers' Association (IMPPA) felicitated Parekh for her outstanding contribution to the Indian film industry (2003)
9. Kalakar Awards – Lifetime Achievement Award (2004)
10. International Indian Film Academy Awards for outstanding achievement in Indian cinema (2006)
11. Saptarang Ke Saptashee Award (2006)
12. Gujarati Association of North America (GANA)'s First International Gujarati Convention—Lifetime Achievement Award (2006)
13. Pune International Film Festival—Lifetime Achievement Award (2007)
14. Bollywood Award—Lifetime Achievement Award (2007)
15. Living Legend Award from the Federation of Indian Chambers of Commerce & Industry (FICCI).
16. Film Federation of India honoured Parekh at its Golden Jubilee celebration ceremony (2008)
17. Sahyadri Navratna Award given to Parekh for being a "woman of substance" (2008)
18. Solitaire for Life Award from the ABN Amro Solitaire Design Awards show (2008)
19. Nashik International Film Festival—Lifetime Achievement Award (2009)
20. 'Lachchu Mahraj Puraskar' Award for Parekh's contribution to dance and acting (2009)
21. 40th International Film Festival of India felicitated Parekh for completing 50 years in Hindi cinema (2009)
22. 'Legends Live Forever Award' from the Immortal Memories Event (2009)
23. Golden Laurel Award—Ninth Gr8 Women Achievers Awards (2010)
24. Prakarti Ratan Award (2010)
25. Jaipur International Film Festival—Lifetime Achievement Award (2011)
26. Bhishma Award by the Ashram Arts Academy (2012)
27. Kalakar Awards – Living Legend Award (2018)
28. "Walk of the Stars" honour, where a tile bears her handprint (2013)
29. Stardust-Lifetime Achievement Award (2015)
30. Most Stylish Lifetime Style Icon Award—Hindustan Times Most Stylish Awards (2017)
31. Second Best Book Award for her memoir "The Hit Girl" at the 5th annual Pune International Literary Festival (PILF) (2017)
32. Bimal Roy Memorial Lifetime Achievement Award (2019)
33. Global Cinema Festival-Lifetime Achievement Award (2020)
34. Master Deenanath Puraskar Award for "dedicated services in the field of cinema" (2022)
35. Dadasaheb Phalke Award presented for the year 2020 by Government of India (2022)
36. India International Film Festival of Boston - Lifetime Achievement Award (2022)
37. Girnar Gaurav Award - Lifetime Achievement Award (2023)
38. Amrit Ratna Samman Award (2023)
39. Raj Kapoor Award given by Maharashtra state government (2024)
40. Reel Legend honour (2026)
