= Shammi Kapoor =

Indian actor (1931–2011)

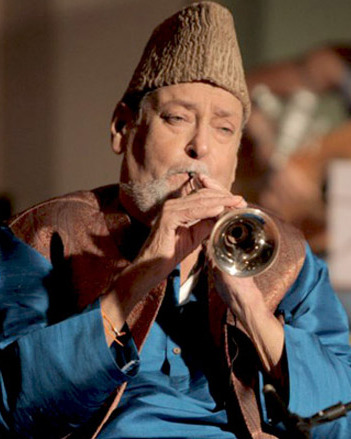
- Kapoor during the filming of Rockstar
- Born: Shamsher Raj Kapoor; 21 October 1931; Bombay, Bombay Presidency, British India (present-day Mumbai, Maharashtra, India)
- Died: 14 August 2011 (aged 79); Mumbai, Maharashtra, India
- Other names: Elvis Presley of India, First Rockstar of Indian Cinema
- Occupations: Actor; director
- Years active: 1953–2011
- Works: Full list
- Spouses: Geeta Bali (m. 1955; died 1965) Neila Devi Gohil (m. 1969)
- Children: 2, including Aditya
- Parents: Prithviraj Kapoor (father); Ramsarni Mehra Kapoor (mother)
- Family: Kapoor family
- Website: shammikapoor.net

Shammi Kapoor (born Shamsher Raj Kapoor; pronounced [ʃʌmːi kʌpuːɾ]; 21 October 1931 – 14 August 2011) was an Indian actor known for his work in Hindi cinema. Kapoor is regarded as one of the greatest actors in the history of Indian cinema. In a career spanning over five decades, he worked in over 100 films and was the recipient of three Filmfare Awards, including one for Best Actor.

Born to actor Prithviraj Kapoor and a member of the Kapoor family, he made his film debut with the commercially unsuccessful Jeewan Jyoti (1953). Following roles in continued box-office flops, he had his breakthrough with Tumsa Nahi Dekha (1957), which fetched him the image of a stylish playboy and dancer, and subsequently he gained further recognition with Dil Deke Dekho (1959). Kapoor rose to widespread recognition with the romantic blockbuster Junglee (1961), and went on to become one of the most marketable Bollywood stars throughout the 1960s, appearing in a number of highly successful films such as Professor (1962), Dil Tera Diwana (1962), China Town (1962), Rajkumar (1964), Kashmir Ki Kali (1964), Janwar (1965), Teesri Manzil (1966), An Evening In Paris (1967), Brahmachari (1968) and Prince (1969). For Brahmachari, he won the Filmfare Award for Best Actor.

Following his leading role in Andaz (1971), he began to appear in supporting roles. Such notable roles are in films including Parvarish (1977), Prem Rog (1982), Vidhaata (1982), Betaab (1983), Hero (1983), Sohni Mahiwal (1984), Wanted (1984), Hukumat (1987), Daata (1989), Tahalka (1992), Chamatkar (1992), Gardish (1993) and Rockstar (2011), which was his final film. For Vidhaata, he won the Filmfare Award for Best Supporting Actor. Apart from acting, Kapoor was widely considered among the best dancers.

== Early life and family ==
Kapoor was born as Shamsher Raj Kapoor in a Punjabi Hindu family in Bombay (now Mumbai) to Prithviraj Kapoor and Ramsharni Mehra Kapoor. Shammi was the second of the three sons of Prithviraj (the other two being Raj Kapoor and Shashi Kapoor, both successful Hindi film actors). He was the nephew of actor Trilok Kapoor. His father's first cousin was producer and filmmaker Surinder Kapoor. He was the first cousin of singer Juggal Kishore Mehra, whose granddaughter is the actress-singer Salma Agha. Former Bollywood actors Randhir, Rishi and Rajiv are his nephews, while actor Ranbir is his grand nephew and actresses Karisma and Kareena are his grand nieces.

Though born in Mumbai, he spent a major portion of his childhood in Calcutta (now Kolkata), where his father was involved with New Theatres Studios, acting in films. It was in Kolkata that he did his Montessori education and Kindergarten. After returning to Bombay, he first went to St. Joseph's Convent (Wadala) and then, to Don Bosco School. He finished his matric schooling from New Era School at Hughes Road.

Kapoor had a short stint at Ramnarain Ruia College after which he joined his father's theatrical company Prithvi Theatres. He entered the cinema world in 1948, as a junior artiste, at a salary of Rs. 50 per month, stayed with Prithvi Theatres for the next four years and collected his last paycheck of Rs. 300, in 1952. He made his debut in Hindi films in the year 1953, when the film Jeewan Jyoti was released. It was directed by Mahesh Kaul and Chand Usmani was Kapoor's first heroine.

== Career ==
Shammi Kapoor debuted into Hindi films in 1953, with the release of Jeewan Jyoti, starring Shashikala and Leela Mishra. Kapoor's career started unsuccessfully in the early 1950s with him acting with established actresses playing second fiddle in woman-oriented movies: with Madhubala in films such as Rail Ka Dibba (1953) and Naqab (1955), with Nutan in Laila Majnu, with Shyama in Thokar and with Nalini Jaywant in Ham Sab Chor Hain and Mehbooba; Shama Parwana (1954) with Suraiya, comedy flick Mem Sahib (1956) with Meena Kumari, and thrillers like Chor Bazar (1954), as well as in the tragic love story Mirza Sahiban (1957) opposite Shyama. From 1953 to 1957, none of his films made him popular.

He had his first major success with Filmistan's Nasir Hussain directed Tumsa Nahin Dekha (1957) opposite Ameeta and with Dil Deke Dekho (1959), he attained the image of a light-hearted, and stylish playboy. With the hugely successful Junglee (1961) his new image was cemented and most of his subsequent films were in the romantic comedy and musical thriller genres. Mohammed Rafi was frequently chosen as his playback voice in the movies that he did and contributed to the success of his films.

In the 1960s he was often paired with new actresses such as Asha Parekh, Saira Banu, Sharmila Tagore and Sadhana all of whom went on to have very successful careers. In the first half of the 1960s, Kapoor was seen in successful films like Rajkumar, Professor, Dil Tera Diwana, China Town, Kashmir Ki Kali, Bluff Master, Janwar and Teesri Manzil. In 1968, he received the first Filmfare Award for Best Actor of his career for Brahmachari. He made a unique place for himself in the industry as he was the only dancing hero in Hindi films from the late 1950s till the early 1970s. He used to compose dancing steps in the songs starring him and reportedly never needed a choreographer. This earned him the name of Elvis Presley of India.

His pairing opposite Southern heroines tended to be commercially successful. He played opposite B. Saroja Devi in Pyaar Kiya To Darna Kya and Preet Na Jane Reet, with Padmini in Singapore, and opposite Vyjayanthimala in College Girl and Prince and with Ragini in Mujrim. In the late 1960s, his successful films included Budtameez and Sachaai with Sadhana, Brahmachari with Rajshree, Latt Saheb with Nutan, Tumse Achha Kaun Hai with Babita, An Evening in Paris with Sharmila Tagore and Prince with Vyjayanthimala.

In the 1970s, Kapoor's weight problem proved an obstacle when playing the romantic hero, and the last such film he played in was Andaz (1971) co-starring superstar Rajesh Khanna and Hema Malini. Chhote Sarkar (1974) was his last movie in a lead role. He turned into a successful supporting actor in the 1970s, playing Saira Banu's father in Zameer (1975), when he had been her leading man a decade earlier in Junglee (1961) and Bluff Master (1963) and playing Vinod Khanna's father and Amitabh Bachchan's foster father in Parvarish (1977). He also directed Manoranjan (1974), a movie inspired from Irma La Douce and Bundal Baaz (1976). Neither were successful commercially though they got critical acclaim and were hailed as classics and ahead of their time.

In the 1980s, he continued to play many supporting roles in films like Prem Rog, Hero, Betaab and Vidhaata for which he won a Filmfare Award for Best Supporting Actor where big giants as Dilip Kumar and Sanjeev Kumar played major roles. He played a rare negative role in the 1992 film Tahalka.

In the 1990s he also appeared on television such as in the social drama serial called Chattan which aired on Zee TV for more than a year in the 1990s. He eventually cut down on film appearances by the late 1990s and early 2000s with appearances in the 1999 Salman Khan and Urmila Matondkar starrer Jaanam Samjha Karo, Dev Anand's 2001 film Censor, the 2002 release Waah! Tera Kya Kehna and the delayed 2006 release Sandwich.

Shortly before his death, he made his last film appearance in Imtiaz Ali's 2011 directorial venture Rockstar co-starring his grand-nephew Ranbir Kapoor, the grandson of his brother Raj Kapoor.

Director Shakti Samanta directed Shammi Kapoor in six films — Singapore, China Town, Kashmir Ki Kali, An Evening In Paris, Pagla Kahin Ka and Jaane Anjane (the last two were unsuccessful) — and said in an interview "I found Shammi to be a thoroughly good man. Even in his heyday, he was humble."

== Personal life ==
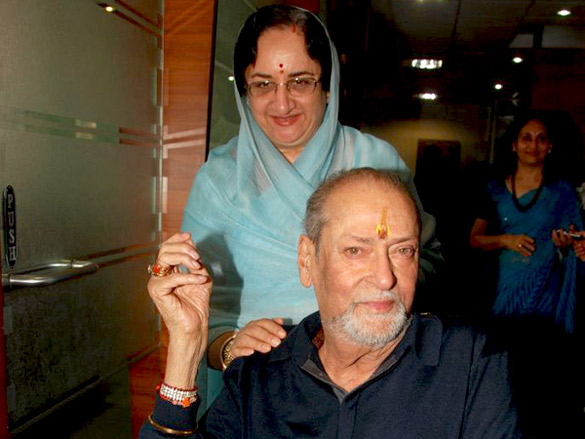
Kapoor with his second wife Neila Devi in 2010

From 1953 to 1955, he was in a relationship with Nadia Gamal, an Egyptian actress and belly dancer from Cairo, after they met in Sri Lanka on an occasion while he was on holiday there. Their relationship ended when she moved back to Cairo.

Kapoor met actress Geeta Bali in 1955, during the film Miss Coca Cola. They fell in love while shooting of the film Rangeen Raaten, where he was the leading actor and she played a cameo. Four months later, the couple got married at Banganga Temple, near Malabar Hill of Mumbai, on 23 August 1955. Their son, Aditya Raj Kapoor, was born on 1 July 1956, at Shirodkar's Hospital, Mumbai. Five years later, on 8 August 1961, they had a daughter, Kanchan Kapoor. Bali died on 21 January 1965, at the age of 34, of smallpox. Four years later, Kapoor married Neila Devi Gohil (born August 1941), a princess of the Gohil dynasty of Bhavnagar State, on 27 January 1969. They had known each other since she was 9 and he was 19.

In an interview in 2011, Mumtaz had stated that Kapoor had proposed marriage to her, as they had become close while shooting for Brahmachari. Mumtaz states that she had politely refused, as Kapoor wanted her to give up her career.

Kapoor was the founder and chairman of Internet Users Community of India (IUCI). He had also played a major role in setting up internet organisations like the Ethical Hackers Association. Kapoor also maintained a website dedicated to the Kapoor family. l

Kapoor was a follower of Haidakhan Babaji.

== Artistry and legacy ==
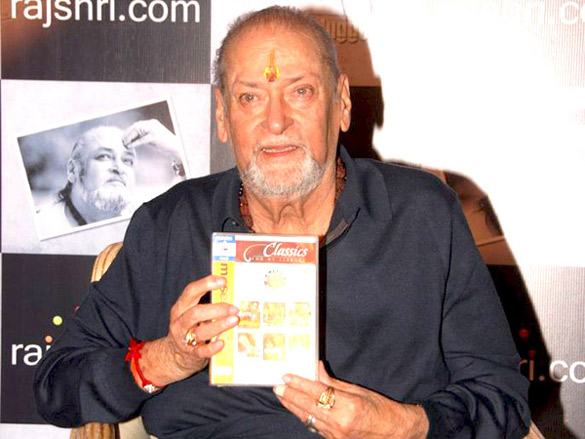
Kapoor in 2010

Kapoor is regarded as one of the most iconic actors of Hindi cinema. Kapoor was recognised for his stylish playboy image and dancing skills. One of the most successful actor of 1960s, Kapoor appeared in Box Office India's "Top Actors" list four times, (1962, 1964-1966). In 2022, he was placed in Outlook India's "75 Best Bollywood Actors" list. He was also known for his charismatic personality and unmatched talent. He was compared to the American actor Elvis Presley. Kapoor was also termed as the "Yahoo star". Filmfare placed him first in its "Bollywood's most stylish men" list.

Shaikh Ayaz of Indian Express said, "Shammi Kapoor, along with Dev Anand, set the template for our typical Bollywood hero. He was the quintessential modern Bollywood hero." Madhavi Pothukuchi of The Print noted that Kapoor seemed to have a different kind of influence with his "unparalleled energy" which could liven up any film. Limber, loose and complete with a signature head bob, his dance moves were "inimitable". Dinesh Raheja of Rediff.com noted that Shammi Kapoor was an effervescent hero who had so much energy that even a 35 mm screen could barely contain it. Journalist Rauf Ahmed added Kapoor on his "Biggest stars in Hindi filmdom" list and noted, "He was an original and a natural. He broke the mould of the Hindi film hero, gave him am erotic presence, revolutionised the love scene and invested the song-and-dance-routine."

== Filmography ==
Kapoor starred in over 100 films in his career. He won the Filmfare Award for Best Actor for his performance in Brahmachari (1968) and Best Supporting Actor for Vidhaata (1982).

== Death and tributes ==
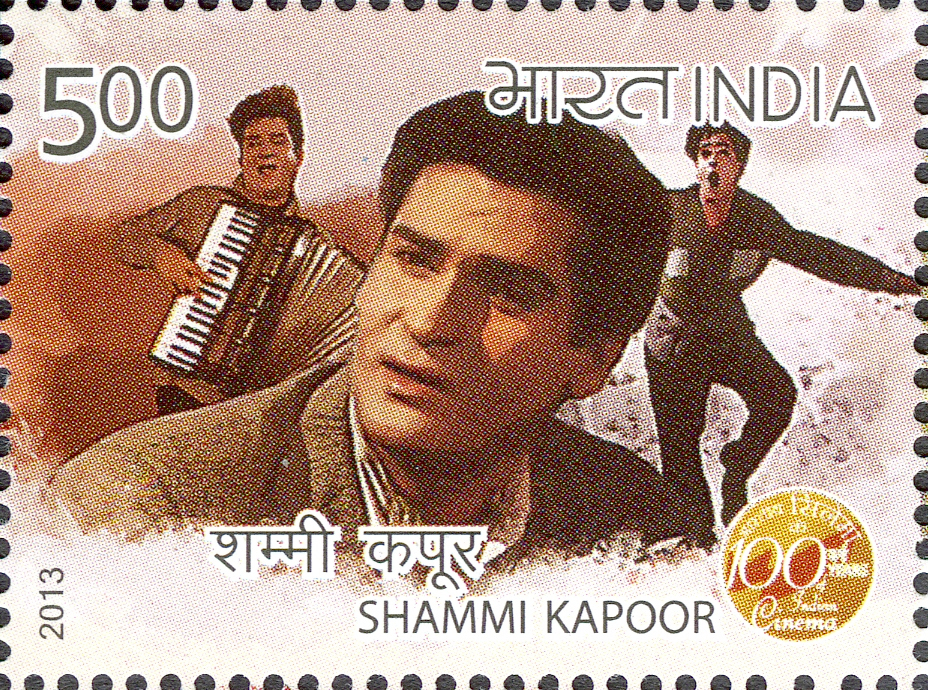
Kapoor on a 2013 stamp of India

Kapoor's co-actor Mumtaz stated in an interview, that few months before his death, she met him in a party. He was drinking wine. When she asked why was he drinking wine, he told her that he had only a few months to live. Kapoor was admitted to the Breach Candy Hospital, Mumbai on 7 August 2011 suffering from chronic kidney failure. His condition remained serious for the next few days and he was kept on ventilator support. He died on 14 August 2011, 05:15 am IST, of chronic kidney failure, aged 79. The funeral was held on Monday, 15 August at the Banganga cremation ground, Malabar Hill, Mumbai. His son, Aditya, performed the last rites. The entire Kapoor family was present to pay their last respects, including Shashi, Krishna, Rishi, Randhir, Rajiv, Babita, Karisma, Kareena and Ranbir. Bollywood personalities including Vinod Khanna, Shatrughan Sinha, Subhash Ghai, Amitabh Bachchan and Aamir Khan, were among others who attended the funeral.

On the occasion of 100 years of Indian cinema, a postage stamp bearing his image was released by India Post to honor him in May 2013. In his honor, a brass statue was unveiled at Walk of the Stars at Bandra Bandstand, along with his autograph. In 2011, Directorate of Film Festivals organized a seven-film retrospective of Kapoor. The same year, South Asian Film Festival also held a special screening of the actor's film Brahmachari, as a tribute. In 2016, Rauf Ahmed wrote Kapoor's biography named, "Shammi Kapoor: The Game Changer".

== Accolades ==
=== Filmfare awards ===
Year	Award	Category	Work	Result	Ref.
1963	Filmfare Awards	Best Actor	Professor	Nominated	
1969	Filmfare Awards	Best Actor	Brahmachari	Won	
1982	Filmfare Awards	Best Supporting Actor	Vidhaata	Won	

=== Other awards ===
Year	Award	Category	Result	Ref.
1995	Filmfare Awards	Lifetime Achievement Award	Honoured	
1999	Zee Cine Awards	Lifetime Achievement	Honoured	
2001	Screen Awards	Lifetime Achievement Award	Honoured	
2002	IIFA Awards	Lifetime Achievement Award	Honoured	
2005	Bollywood Movie Awards	Lifetime Achievement Award	Honoured	

=== Other recognitions ===
- 1998 – Kalakar Awards – Special Award for "Contribution in Indian Cinema".
- 2001 – Anandalok Awards - Lifetime Achievement Award for "Contribution in Indian Cinema".
- 2005 – Raj Kapoor Award - Lifetime Achievement Award for "Contribution in Hindi Cinema."
- 2007 – Living Legend Award by the Federation of Indian Chamber of Commerce and Industry (FICCI).
- 2008 – Pune International Film Festival - Lifetime Achievement Award for his contribution to Indian Cinema.
- 2010 – Rashtriya Gaurav Award.
