= Indian film music =

Music produced for India's mainstream motion picture industry

Indian film music refers to the music produced for India's mainstream motion picture industry and written and performed for Indian cinema. In cinema, music directors make up the main body of composers; the songs are performed by playback singers and the genre represents 72% of the music sales market in India.

Indian film music tends to have appeal across India, Nepal, Pakistan, Bangladesh and overseas, especially among the Indian diaspora. Songs are often in different languages depending on the target audience, for example in Hindi, Urdu, Malayalam, Kannada, Telugu, Tamil, Odia, Punjabi, Bengali, Marathi, Assamese, etc. Playback singers are usually more noted for their ability to sing rather than their charisma as performers. Their level of success and appeal is tied to their involvement with film soundtracks of cinema releases with the highest box office ratings.

== Origins ==
In the earliest years of Indian cinema, film music was primarily influenced by Indian classical traditions, including Carnatic music and Hindustani classical music, as well as regional folk music. Over time, Western musical elements such as orchestration, harmony, and instrumentation became increasingly incorporated into film music, especially from the mid-20th century onward. Despite these changes, film soundtracks remain diverse, often blending multiple musical styles or returning to classical roots.

== Music directors ==
R. C. Boral, Harishchandra Bali, Pankaj Mullick, Anil Biswas, Naushad Ali, Khwaja Khurshid Anwar and S. Rajeswara Rao were noteworthy music directors of the 1940s. Rao, who scored the 1948 Tamil Chandralekha, the first all-India hit, continued music directing in Chennai until the 1980s. The 1950s and 1960s, included music composers like Shankar Jaikishan, S. D. Burman, O. P. Nayyar, Madan Mohan, Hemant Kumar, C. Ramchandra, Roshan, Vasant Desai, Kalyanji–Anandji and Khayyam in Hindi film music. K. V. Mahadevan, Vishwanathan-Ramamoorthy, Laxmikant–Pyarelal, G. Devarajan, V. Dakshinamoorthy and M. S. Viswanathan were active music directors for more than 35 years from the 1950s.

As Indian cinema segued into the 1960s and 1970s, pop artists like R. D. Burman, Bappi Lahiri and duos like Nadeem–Shravan and Jatin–Lalit gave Indian film music a stronger western flavor with composers Ilaiyaraaja and Raveendran who rose to fame during the 1970s and 1980s in Tamil film music.

Major musical forces in the 1990s and 2000s have included A. R. Rahman, Nadeem–Shravan, Pritam, Himesh Reshammiya, Harris Jayaraj, Shankar–Ehsaan–Loy, Vishal–Shekhar, Vidyasagar, Ramesh Narayan, M. Jayachandran, Yuvan Shankar Raja, Deepak Dev, Johnson, Anu Malik, Nusrat Fateh Ali Khan, Salim–Sulaiman, Devi Sri Prasad etc. A. R. Rahman, who was described by Time magazine as "India's most prominent movie songwriter", is widely accepted to be the most internationally recognized Indian musician.

== Playback singers ==
A playback singer is a singer who pre-records songs for use in films. The singer records the song and the actors or actresses lip-sync the song in front of the cameras, a form of singing that is characteristic of the Indian subcontinent. The songs of a film, the quality of the music and its music director (composer), lyricist and singer have often determined the success of a film. Film soundtracks are sometimes released before the film itself, resulting in a disparity between the soundtrack and the songs appearing in the film.

Kundan Lal Saigal was one of the earliest playback singers in the Indian music industry. Notable playback singers include Kishore Kumar, Lata Mangeshkar, Asha Bhosle, Mohammed Rafi, Mukesh, Manna Dey, Hemant Kumar, Talat Mahmood, Mahendra Kapoor, S. P. Balasubrahmanyam, K. J. Yesudas, S. Janaki, P. Susheela, K. S. Chithra, MG Sreekumar, Udit Narayan, Amit Kumar, Alka Yagnik, Sujatha, Hemlata (singer), Kumar Sanu, Armaan Malik, Sonu Nigam, Shaan, KK, Shreya Ghoshal, Arijit Singh, Mohit Chauhan, Javed Ali, Neha Kakkar, Priyadarshini and many others.

== Lyricists ==
In the 1950s and 1960s, lyricists like Shailendra, Hasrat Jaipuri, Sahir Ludhianvi, Raja Mehdi Ali Khan, Rajendra Krishan, Majrooh Sultanpuri, Bharat Vyas, Shakeel Badayuni, Qamar Jalalabadi, Anand Bakshi, Jan Nisar Akhtar and S. H. Bihari wrote lyrics of many classic film songs. Lyrics tended towards the literary and drew heavily on contemporary Urdu and Hindi poetry. The south has seen poets like Kannadasan, Vairamuthu and Vaali rise to prominence, in Tamil poetry and literature alongside Vayalar Ramavarma, P. Bhaskaran, O. N. V. Kurup in the Malayalam music industry.

Nowadays, some famous lyricists are Rashmi Virag, Kunaal Vermaa, Manoj Muntashir, Rakesh Kumar, Irshad Kamil, Sayeed Quadri, Armaan Malik etc.

== Popularity ratings ==
Binaca Geetmala, Ameen Sayani's popular Hindi language radio show before satellite television took over in India sometime in the 1990s, gave weekly popularity ratings of Hindi film songs (akin to the Billboard Hot 100 list of songs). It ran in various incarnations from 1952 to 1993, and annual lists of the most popular songs were played at year-end. The list was compiled on the basis of record sales in India. Currently, Hindi film music songs are sold on tape and CD compilations, played as promos and in programs on various television channels and radio stations, with different popularity ratings claiming different songs as being on the top. In an annual exercise, a net-based effort RMIM Puraskaar lists all important Hindi film songs of the year, in addition to awarding songs for various categories.

== Accusations of plagiarism ==
Because popular music directors score a great many films over the course of a year, accusations of plagiarizing abound. For example, one production number in Dil (1990) is based on Carl Perkins' Blue Suede Shoes, sung with Hindi lyrics. Of late the Indian film industry has been gaining visibility outside India, and the legal risks of plagiarism have been gaining importance. Some producers have actually paid for the musical rights to popular Western songs, as in Kal Ho Naa Ho's (2003) song, "Oh, Pretty Woman". Plagiarism has also existed within India, with several music directors in Bombay cinema lifting tunes from other "regional" industries.

There have also been accusations of plagiarism against foreigner musicians borrowing from Hindi film songs. For example, "Don't Phunk with My Heart" by The Black Eyed Peas was largely based on two 1970s film songs: "Ye Mera Dil Yaar Ka Diwana" from Don (1978) and "Ae Naujawan Hai Sab Kuchh Yahan" from Apradh (1972). Both songs were originally composed by Kalyanji Anandji and sung by Asha Bhosle. Another example is "Addictive" sung by Truth Hurts, which is lifted from Lata Mangeshkar's "Thoda Resham Lagta Hai" from Jyoti (1981). This led to the copyright holders of the original song filing a lawsuit against DJ Quik and Dr. Dre, the producers of "Addictive". Film music composed by A. R. Rahman (who would later win two Academy Awards for the Slumdog Millionaire soundtrack) has frequently been sampled by musicians elsewhere in the world, including the Singaporean artist Kelly Poon, the Uzbek artist Iroda Dilroz, the French rap group La Caution, the American artist Ciara, and the German band Löwenherz, among others.

== Wider success ==
Indian film music is also making exerting influence beyond the usual Desi audiences, with many Western music stores today carrying Indian music compilations. As early as 1978, the synthpop pioneers Haruomi Hosono and Ryuichi Sakamoto of the Yellow Magic Orchestra produced an electronic album Cochin Moon based on an experimental fusion between electronic music and Bollywood-inspired Indian music. Later in 1988, Devo's hit song "Disco Dancer" was inspired by the song "I am a Disco Dancer" from the Bollywood film Disco Dancer (1982).

Baz Luhrmann showcases the song "Chamma Chamma" from China Gate (1998) in his 2001 movie Moulin Rouge. Another 2001 film Ghost World featured Mohammed Rafi's song "Jaan Pehechan Ho" from the 1965 film Gumnaam. The 2002 song "Addictive", sung by Truth Hurts and produced by DJ Quik and Dr. Dre, was lifted from Lata Mangeshkar's "Thoda Resham Lagta Hai" from Jyoti (1981). The Black Eyed Peas' Grammy Award winning 2005 song "Don't Phunk with My Heart" was inspired by two 1970s Bollywood songs: "Ye Mera Dil Yaar Ka Diwana" from Don (1978) and "Ae Naujawan Hai Sab Kuchh Yahan" from Apradh (1972). Both songs were originally composed by Kalyanji Anandji, sung by Asha Bhosle, and featured the dancer Helen. The songs "Mera Man Tera Pyasa" from the movie Gambler (1971) performed by Mohammed Rafi, "Tere Sang Pyar Main" from the movie Nagin (1976) performed by Lata Mangeshkar, and "Wada Na Tod" also by Lata Mangeshkar from the movie Dil Tujhko Diya (1987) were featured in Eternal Sunshine of the Spotless Mind (2004). Scores from Chennai Tamil films have appeared in productions such as Lord of War (2005) and The Accidental Husband (2008). Ilaiyaraaja won the Gold Remi Award for Best Music Score jointly with film composer M. S. Viswanathan at the WorldFest-Houston Film Festival for the Tamil film Vishwa Thulasi (2005).

A. R. Rahman rose to fame from the Kollywood film industry to become one of the most popular international music directors and has had a musical Bombay Dreams, playing in London and New York, and scored several projects outside India. He has won two Academy awards and two Grammy awards, even numerous international awards and accolades. The song "Chaiyya Chaiyya", originally composed by A. R. Rahman for Dil Se.. (1998), has also been well received around the world, making several top 10 world music lists and has even been featured in several American movies. The song was in both the opening scene and credits of Spike Lee's Inside Man. Rahman's earlier soundtrack for Roja (1991) was included in Time's 10 Best Soundtracks of all time in 2005. He has been regarded as the only composer from India to attain massive popularity and fame in the international arena. Hindi film music has reached an even wider global audience due to the success of the Slumdog Millionaire soundtrack, also composed by Rahman. Singaporean-Indian singer Priyadarshini is regarded as the first Indian playback singer to carry out Ph.D. research in film music and document 100 years of music in Tamil cinema and 90 years in Kannada cinema

== See also ==
- Hindi cinema
- Cinema of India
- Filmi qawwali
- List of Indian film music directors
- Hindi film music
- Playback singer
- Tamil cinema
- Telugu cinema
