= Ghost World (film) =

2001 black comedy film by Terry Zwigoff

- Theatrical release poster
- Directed by: Terry Zwigoff
- Screenplay by: Daniel Clowes; Terry Zwigoff
- Based on: Ghost World by Daniel Clowes
- Produced by: Lianne Halfon; John Malkovich; Russell Smith
- Starring: Thora Birch; Scarlett Johansson; Brad Renfro; Illeana Douglas; Steve Buscemi
- Cinematography: Affonso Beato
- Edited by: Carole Kravetz-Aykanian; Michael R. Miller
- Music by: David Kitay
- Production companies: Advanced Medien; Granada Film; Jersey Shore; Mr. Mudd
- Distributed by: United Artists (United States; through MGM Distribution Co.); Icon Film Distribution (United Kingdom); Advanced Film (Germany)
- Release dates: June 16, 2001 (SIFF); July 20, 2001 (United States); October 18, 2001 (Germany); November 16, 2001 (United Kingdom)
- Running time: 112 minutes
- Countries: United States; United Kingdom; Germany
- Language: English
- Budget: $7 million
- Box office: $8 million

Ghost World is a 2001 comedy film co-written and directed by Terry Zwigoff. Based on the 1990s comic book of the same name by Daniel Clowes, the story focuses on the lives of teenage outsiders Enid (Thora Birch) and Rebecca (Scarlett Johansson), who face a rift in their friendship as Enid takes an interest in an older man named Seymour (Steve Buscemi), and becomes determined to help his romantic life.

Ghost World debuted at the Seattle International Film Festival in 2001. It had little box office impact but received critical acclaim. It was nominated for the Academy Award for Best Adapted Screenplay and has become a cult film.

== Plot ==
Best friends Enid and Rebecca face the summer after their high school graduation, with no plans for their future, other than to find jobs and live together. The girls are cynical social outcasts, but Rebecca is more popular with boys than Enid. Enid's diploma is withheld on the condition that she attend a remedial art class. Even though she is a talented artist, her art teacher, Roberta, believes that art must be socially meaningful and dismisses Enid's sketches as nothing more than "light entertainment".

The girls see a personal ad in which a lonely, middle-aged man named Seymour asks a woman he met recently to contact him. Enid makes a prank phone call to Seymour, pretending to be the woman and inviting him to meet her at a diner. The two girls and their friend, Josh, secretly watch Seymour at the diner and make fun of him. Enid soon begins to feel sympathy for Seymour, and they follow him to his apartment building.

They later find him selling vintage records in a garage sale. Enid buys an old blues album from him, and they become friends. Around this time, Enid meets an old man named Norman who continually waits at an out-of-service bus stop for a bus that will never come.

She decides to try to find women for Seymour to date. She persuades him to lend her an old poster depicting a grotesquely caricatured black man, which was once used as a promotional tool by Coon Chicken Inn, the fried chicken franchise now known as Cook's Chicken, where Seymour works in corporate. Enid presents the poster in class as a social comment about racism, and Roberta is so impressed with the concept that she offers Enid a scholarship to an art college.

Seymour receives a phone call from Dana, the intended recipient of his personal ad. Enid encourages him to pursue a relationship with Dana, but she becomes unexpectedly jealous when he does so. Enid's and Rebecca's lives start to diverge. While Enid has been spending time with Seymour, Rebecca starts working at a coffee shop. Enid gets a job at a movie theater, so she can afford to rent an apartment with Rebecca, but her cynical attitude and reluctance to upsell concessions get her fired on her first day. The girls argue, and Rebecca abandons the idea of living with Enid.

When Enid's poster is displayed in an art show, school officials find it so offensive they force Roberta to give her a failing grade and revoke the scholarship. Enid turns to Seymour for solace, resulting in a drunken one-night stand. Seymour breaks up with Dana and is fired from his job when the Coon Chicken poster is publicized in a local newspaper. He unsuccessfully tries to contact Enid, only for Rebecca to tell him about Enid's prank phone call, describing the way they mocked him at the diner. Seymour, thinking that Enid is dating Josh, angrily goes to the convenience store where he works. Another customer ends up in a violent confrontation with Seymour, resulting in him being injured and hospitalized.

Enid visits Seymour in the hospital to apologize, and later reconciles with Rebecca. As Enid watches from across the street, Norman boards an out-of-service bus. The next day, Seymour, now living with his mother, discusses the summer's events with his therapist and attempts to get a fresh start. Meanwhile, Enid returns to the bus stop and boards the out-of-service bus when it arrives, giving in to her childhood fantasy of running away from home and disappearing.

A post-credits scene shows an alternate version of Seymour's scene in the convenience store, in which he wins the fight and is not injured.

== Cast ==
- Thora Birch as Enid
- Scarlett Johansson as Rebecca
- Brad Renfro as Josh
- Bob Balaban as Enid's father
- Illeana Douglas as Roberta Allsworth
- Steve Buscemi as Seymour
- Tom McGowan as Joe
- Stacey Travis as Dana
- David Cross as Gerrold
- Pat Healy as John Ellis
- Charles C. Stevenson Jr. as Norman
- Dave Sheridan as Doug
- Debra Azar as Melora
- Brian George as the Sidewinder boss
- Rini Bell as the graduation speaker
- Ezra Buzzington as Al "Weird Al"
- Ashley Peldon as Margaret
- Lorna Scott as Phyllis, the art show curator
- Dylan Jones as Red-Haired Girl - Blues Club
- John Bunnell as Seymour's boss
- Patrick Fischler as the Masterpiece Video clerk
- Diane Salinger as Psychiatrist
- Anna Berger as Seymour's mother
- Bruce Glover as Feldman, the wheelchair guy
- Teri Garr as Maxine (uncredited)

== Production and technique ==
The film was directed by Terry Zwigoff with cinematography by Affonso Beato. Zwigoff and Ghost World comic creator Daniel Clowes wrote the screenplay together. Years later, Clowes admitted that writing the screenplay came with a significant learning curve. He recalled, "I started by trying to transcribe the comic into Final Draft. I figured that's how you do an adaptation. Then I tried throwing everything away and writing an entirely new story that was very different from the book. And I synthesized those two things into a final screenplay. The actual film itself is very different from the script we wrote. We ended up jettisoning the last twenty pages and rethought the whole thing as we were filming. It was really held together by hair and spit."

Zwigoff and Clowes presented Beato with the task of making a comic book look to the movie. They asked for a fresh technique from earlier examples such as X-Men and Batman; Dick Tracy specifically was dismissed as literal-minded and "insulting" to the art form. According to Clowes, cameraman Beato "really took it to heart", carefully studying the style and color of the original comics. The final cut is just slightly oversaturated, purposefully redolent of "the way the modern world looks where everything is trying to get your attention at once".

Zwigoff also added his individual vision to the adaptation, particularly in his capture and editing of languid, lingering shots, a technique derived from his experience as a documentarian. Another notable touch is his minimal use of extras in the film, making the city and its streets intentionally empty – Clowes notes approvingly, "It captures this weird feeling of alienation in the endless modern consumer culture."

== Themes ==
=== Ending and suicide theory ===
Many viewers have interpreted Enid getting on the empty out-of-service bus at the end of the film as a metaphor for Enid taking her own life. In the 1990s, the phrase "catch the bus" was used to refer to suicide. Early in the film, Enid says that she will kill herself if Maxine starts dating her father again, and, later in the film, Enid's father says that Maxine will be moving in with them.

In a 2002 interview, Daniel Clowes and Terry Zwigoff were asked if the ending of the film adaptation was a metaphor for suicide. Clowes replied, "Yeah, it could be. It's hard to figure out why people have that response. The first time I heard that I said, 'What? You're out of your mind. What are you talking about?' But I've heard that hundreds of times". Zwigoff expanded on his views in a 2021 interview, saying: "Many interpreted it to mean Enid died by suicide [...] I personally thought of the ending as more positive: that she's moving on with her life, that she had faith in herself".

Birch, on the other hand, stated: "Honestly, it's a sad film, to me... I have a very dark view of where that story is leading, unfortunately".

== Soundtrack ==
Ghost World: Original Motion Picture Soundtrack

Soundtrack album by various artists
- Released: June 20, 2005
- Genres: Bollywood, string band, blues, jazz
- Length: 62:58
- Label: Shanachie

Professional ratings
Review scores
Source	Rating
Allmusic	4/5 stars

Music in the film includes "Jaan Pehechan Ho" by Mohammed Rafi, a dance number choreographed by Herman Benjamin from the 1965 Bollywood musical Gumnaam which Enid watches and dances to early in the film, and "Devil Got My Woman" by Skip James (1931), as well as "Pickin' Cotton Blues" by the bar band, Blueshammer.

There are songs by other artists mentioned in the film, including Lionel Belasco, which are reflective of the character Seymour, and of director Terry Zwigoff. Zwigoff is a collector of 78 RPM records, as portrayed by Seymour. Other tracks are by Vince Giordano, a musician who specializes in meticulous recreations of songs from old 78 RPM records.

Referenced in the film is R. Crumb & His Cheap Suit Serenaders, a band that Zwigoff played in. Enid asks Seymour about the band's second album, Chasin' Rainbows, and Seymour replies, "Nah, that one's not so great."

Missing from the soundtrack album are "What Do I Get?" by Buzzcocks, which can be heard when Enid dresses up like a punk, and the song "A Smile and a Ribbon" by Patience and Prudence.

Ghost World: Original Motion Picture Soundtrack
No.	Title	Writer(s)	Performer(s)	Length
1.	"Jaan Pehechan Ho" (1965)	Shankar Jaikishan (music); Shailendra (lyrics)	Mohammed Rafi	5:28
2.	"Graduation Rap"	Nicole Sill, Guy Thomas (music); Daniel Clowes (lyrics)	Vanilla, Jade and Ebony	0:32
3.	"Devil Got My Woman" (1931)	James	Skip James	3:00
4.	"I Must Have It" (cover of King Oliver, 1930)	Davidson Nelson, Joe "King" Oliver	Vince Giordano and the Nighthawks	2:59
5.	"Miranda" (1933)	Thomas Pasatleri, Louis Phillips	Lionel Belasco	3:02
6.	"Pickin' Cotton Blues"	Terry Zwigoff, Steve Pierson, Guy Thomas	Blueshammer	3:35
7.	"Let's Go Riding" (1935)	Freddie Spruell	Mr. Freddie	2:55
8.	"Georgia on My Mind"	Hoagy Carmichael (music); Stuart Gorrell (lyrics)	Vince Giordano and the Nighthawks	3:11
9.	"Las Palmas de Maracaibo" (1930)	Belasco	Lionel Belasco	3:15
10.	"Clarice" (cover of Tiny Parham, 1928)	Tiny Parham	Vince Giordano and the Nighthawks	3:29
11.	"Scalding Hot Coffee Rag"	Ventresco	Craig Ventresco	3:02
12.	"You're Just My Type" (cover of King Oliver, 1930)	Nelson, Oliver	Vince Giordano and the Nighthawks	2:33
13.	"Venezuela" (1931)	Victor Colon	Lionel Belasco	3:15
14.	"Fare Thee Well Blues" (1930)	Callicott	Joe Callicott	3:12
15.	"C. C. & O. Blues" (1928)	Anderson, Brownie McGhee	Pink Anderson and Simmie Dooley	3:08
16.	"C-h-i-c-k-e-n Spells Chicken" (1927)	Sidney L. Perrin, Bob Slater	McGee Brothers	2:59
17.	"That's No Way to Get Along" (1929)	Wilkins	Robert Wilkins	2:55
18.	"So Tired" (1928)	Lonnie Johnson	Dallas String Band	3:20
19.	"Bye Bye Baby Blues" (1930)	Jones	Little Hat Jones	3:10
20.	"Theme from Ghost World"	Kitay	David Kitay	3:58

== Release ==
Ghost World premiered on June 16, 2001, at the Seattle International Film Festival, to lower than average recognition by audiences, but admiration from critics. It was also screened at several film festivals worldwide including the Fantasia Festival in Montreal.

Following the film's theatrical exhibition in the United States, Ghost World was released on VHS and DVD format via MGM Home Entertainment in early 2002. Additional features include deleted and alternative scenes, "Making of Ghost World" featurette, the Gumnaam music video "Jaan Pehechaan Ho", and the original theatrical trailer. The film was released on Blu-ray on May 2017, by The Criterion Collection, with a 4K transfer, interviews with the performers, and audio commentary.

=== Box office ===
With a limited commercial theatrical run in the United States, Ghost World's commercial success was minimal. The film was released on July 20, 2001, in five theaters grossing $98,791 on its opening weekend; it slowly expanded to more theaters, reaching a maximum of 128 by the end of the year. It went on to make $6.2 million in North America and $2.5 million in the rest of the world for a worldwide total of $8.7 million, just above its $7 million budget.

== Reception ==
On review aggregator Rotten Tomatoes, the film holds an approval rating of 93% based on 166 reviews. The website's critical consensus reads, "With acerbic wit, Terry Zwigoff fashions Daniel Clowes' graphic novel into an intelligent, comedic trip through deadpan teen angst." On Metacritic, the film received a score of 91 out of 100 based on 32 reviews, indicating "universal acclaim".

Roger Ebert gave the film four out of four stars and wrote:

I wanted to hug this movie. It takes such a risky journey and never steps wrong. It creates specific, original, believable, lovable characters, and meanders with them through their inconsolable days, never losing its sense of humor.

In his review for The New York Times, A. O. Scott praised Thora Birch's performance as Enid:

Thora Birch, whose performance as Lester Burnham's alienated daughter was the best thing about American Beauty, plays a similar character here, with even more intelligence and restraint.

In his Chicago Reader review, Jonathan Rosenbaum wrote:

Birch makes the character an uncanny encapsulation of adolescent agonies without ever romanticizing or sentimentalizing her attitudes, and Clowes and Zwigoff never allow us to patronize her.

However, Andrew Sarris of The New York Observer disliked the character of Enid:

I found Enid smug, complacent, cruel, deceitful, thoughtless, malicious and disloyal... Enid's favorite targets are people who are older, poorer, or dumber than she is.

Kevin Thomas, in his review for the Los Angeles Times, praised Steve Buscemi's portrayal of Seymour:

Buscemi rarely has had so full and challenging a role, that of a mature, reflective man, unhandsome yet not unattractive, thanks to a witty sensitivity and clear intelligence.

Time magazine's Andrew D. Arnold wrote:

Unlike those shrill, hard-sell teen comedies on the other screens, Ghost World never becomes the kind of empty, defensive snark-fest that it targets. Clowes and Zwigoff keep the organic pace of the original, and its empathic exploration of painfully changing relationships.

Michael Dean of The Comics Journal addressed the concerns of comics fans head-on:

Those with higher expectations—and, certainly, Ghost World purists —are likely to experience at least a degree of disappointment. Some of the comic's air of aimless mystery has been paved over with the semblance of a Hollywood plot, and to that extent, the movie is a lesser work than the comic. But it's still a far better movie than we had a right to expect... The injection of a relatively trite plot situation into Ghost World's more enigmatic stream of events is perhaps forgivable, since the film might otherwise never have been produced. Its greatest sin, the misappropriation of Enid's longing, is not so forgivable, though the overlap between Zwigoff's distaste for modernity and Enid's distrust of social acceptability makes it almost palatable. In any case, we want to forgive it, because so much is right about the movie.

Entertainment Weekly gave the film an "A−" rating. Owen Gleiberman wrote, "Ghost World is a movie for anyone who ever felt imprisoned by life, but crazy about it anyway." In her review for the LA Weekly, Manohla Dargis wrote, "If Zwigoff doesn't always make his movie move (he's overly faithful to the concept of the cartoon panel), he has a gift for connecting us to people who aren't obviously likable, then making us see the urgency of that connection."

In Sight & Sound, Leslie Felperin wrote, "Cannily, the main performers deliver most of their lines in slack monotones, all the better to set off the script's wit and balance the glistering cluster of varyingly deranged lesser characters." In his review for The Guardian, Peter Bradshaw wrote, "It is an engaging account of the raw pain of adolescence: the fear of being trapped in a grown-up future and choosing the wrong grown-up identity, and of course the pain of love, which we all learn to anaesthetise with jobs and mundane worries." Several critics referred to the film as an art film.

=== Accolades ===
Award	Date of ceremony	Category	Recipient(s)	Result	Ref(s)
Academy Awards	March 24, 2002	Best Adapted Screenplay	Daniel Clowes, Terry Zwigoff	Nominated	
American Film Institute	January 5, 2002	Screenwriter of the Year	Daniel Clowes, Terry Zwigoff	Nominated	
American Film Institute	January 5, 2002	Featured Actor	Steve Buscemi	Nominated	
Boston Society of Film Critics	December 16, 2001	Best Screenplay	Daniel Clowes, Terry Zwigoff	Runner-up	
Boston Society of Film Critics	December 16, 2001	Best Supporting Actor	Steve Buscemi	Runner-up	
Boston Society of Film Critics	December 16, 2001	Best Supporting Actress	Scarlett Johansson	Runner-up	
Chicago Film Critics Association	February 25, 2002	Best Screenplay	Daniel Clowes, Terry Zwigoff	Nominated	
Chicago Film Critics Association	February 25, 2002	Best Actress	Thora Birch	Nominated	
Chicago Film Critics Association	February 25, 2002	Best Supporting Actor	Steve Buscemi	Won	
Empire Awards	February 5, 2002	Independent Spirit Award	Terry Zwigoff	Nominated	
Golden Globes	January 20, 2002	Best Actress – Comedy or Musical	Thora Birch	Nominated	
Golden Globes	January 20, 2002	Best Supporting Actor	Steve Buscemi	Nominated	
Golden Space Needle Award	June 2001	Best Actress	Thora Birch	Won	
Independent Spirit Awards	March 23, 2002	Best First Feature	Terry Zwigoff	Nominated	
Independent Spirit Awards	March 23, 2002	Best First Screenplay	Daniel Clowes, Terry Zwigoff	Won	
Independent Spirit Awards	March 23, 2002	Best Supporting Actor	Steve Buscemi	Won	
Los Angeles Film Critics Association	December 15, 2001	Best Screenplay	Daniel Clowes, Terry Zwigoff	Runner-up	
National Society of Film Critics	January 4, 2002	Best Supporting Actor	Steve Buscemi	Won	
National Society of Film Critics	January 4, 2002	Best Screenplay	Daniel Clowes, Terry Zwigoff	Runner-up	
New York Film Critics Circle	December 13, 2001	Best Supporting Actor	Steve Buscemi	Won	
Satellite Awards	January 19, 2002	Best Actress, Comedy or Musical	Thora Birch	Nominated	
Satellite Awards	January 19, 2002	Best Supporting Actor, Comedy or Musical	Steve Buscemi	Nominated	
Toronto Film Critics Association	December 20, 2001	Best Screenplay	Daniel Clowes, Terry Zwigoff	Runner-up	
Toronto Film Critics Association	December 20, 2001	Best Actress	Thora Birch	Won	
Toronto Film Critics Association	December 20, 2001	Best Supporting Actress	Scarlett Johansson	Won	
Toronto Film Critics Association	December 20, 2001	Best Supporting Actor	Steve Buscemi	Runner-up	
Writers Guild of America	March 2, 2002	Best Adapted Screenplay	Daniel Clowes, Terry Zwigoff	Nominated	
Young Artist Awards	April 7, 2002	Best Family Feature Film - Comedy	Ghost World	Nominated	

== Legacy ==
In 2009, Ghost World topped MSN Movies' list of the "Top 10 Comic Book Movies". In 2008, it was ranked number 3 out of 94 in Rotten Tomatoes "Comix Worst to Best" countdown, where #1 was the best and #94 the worst. It was ranked 5th "Best" on IGN's "Best & Worst Comic-Book Movies". Empire magazine ranked the film 19th in their "The 20 Greatest Comic Book Movies" list. It is considered a cult film. It was added to the Criterion Collection in 2017.

== See also ==
- List of cult films
