= The Bombay Royale =

Australian musical group

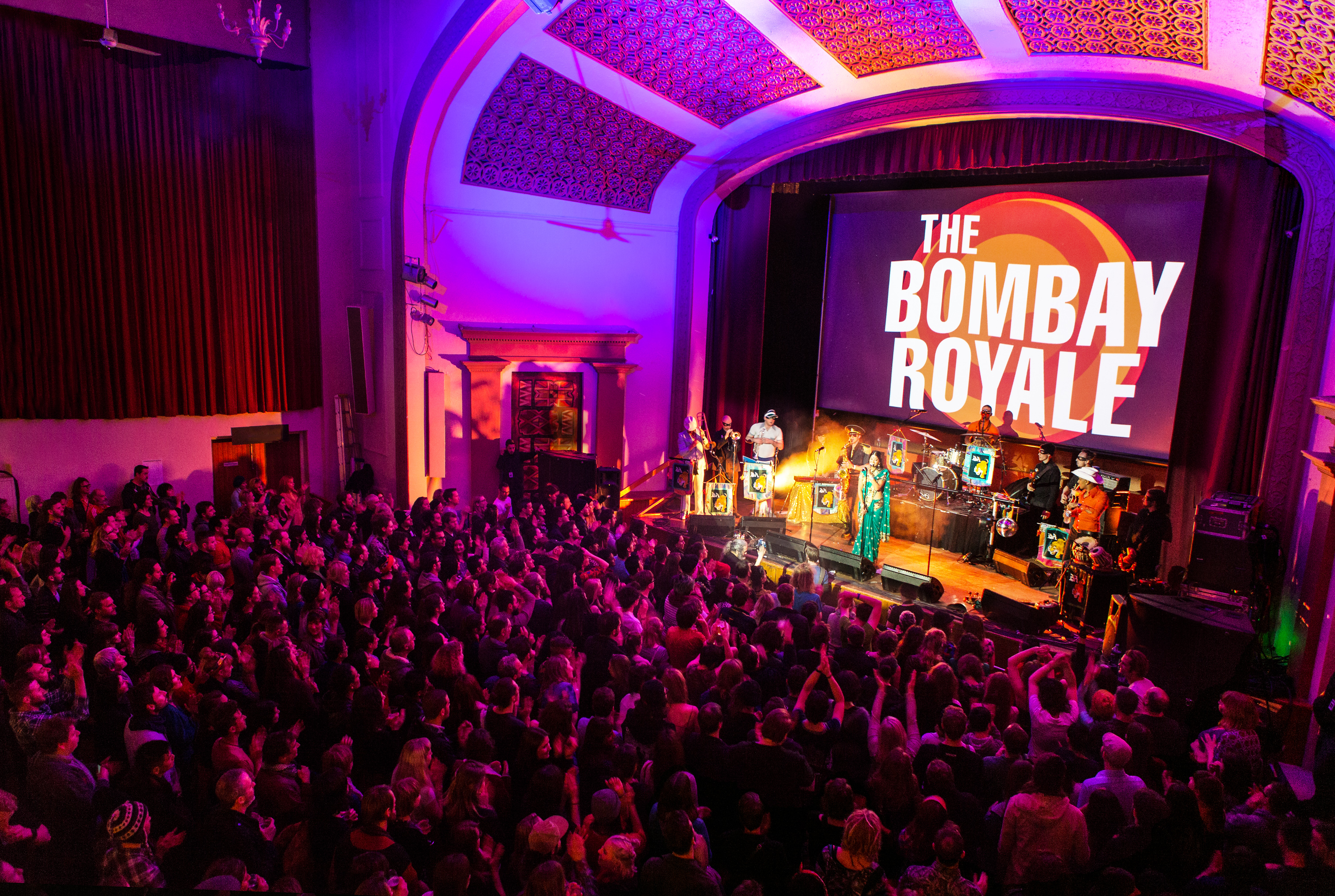
- The Bombay Royale on stage, July 2015

Background information
- Genres: Bollywood, filmi music
- Years active: 2010–2021
- Label: HopeStreet Recordings
- Members: Parvyn; Shourov Bhattacharya; Andy Williamson; Tom Martin; Matt Vehl; Julian Goyma; Josh Bennett; Ed Fairlie; Declan Jones; Ros Jones; Andre Lobanov
- Past members: Bob Knob; Tristan Ludowyk
- Website: thebombayroyale.com

The Bombay Royale was an 11-piece Australian band fronted by singers Parvyn and Shourov Bhattacharya and led by Andy Williamson. The band performed original music that blends funk, disco and pop music with the classical and folk music of India, much like the soundtracks of 1960s and 1970s Bollywood movies. The band was conceived by musical director Andy Williamson who also plays saxophone and flute.

== Musical style ==
The Bombay Royale was originally inspired by the soundtracks of 1960s and 1970s Bollywood movies. Early in its career, the band performed covers of popular Hindi songs from that era such as "Jaan Pehechan Ho" and "Dum Maro Dum". However, they also composed and performed their own original music, synthesizing Indian classical and folk music with Western styles such as funk, rock and disco.

The vocal lines and lyrics to The Bombay Royale's songs are written mostly in Hindi, Bengali and English. The band composed its music collaboratively with major contributions from saxophonist and band leader Andy Williamson, vocalist Shourov Bhattacharya, keyboard player Matty Vehl, bassist Andre Lobanov, guitarist Tom Martin and others.

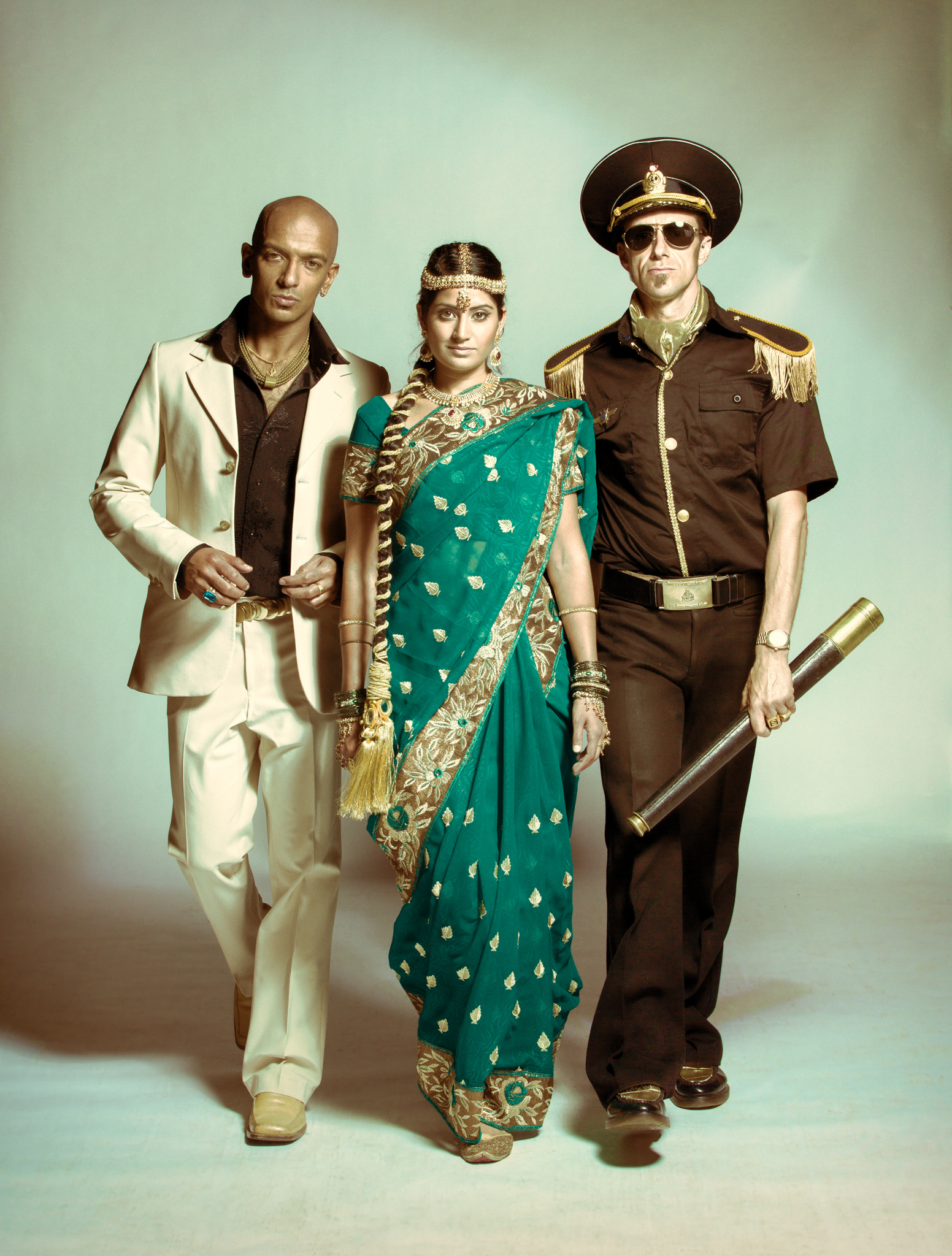
Shourov Bhattacharya, Parvyn and Andy Williamson

== Biography ==
The Bombay Royale was formed in Melbourne, Australia in 2010 by Andy Williamson. Parvyn, the band's female lead singer, is the daughter of Dya Singh, a traditional shabad singer. She is a Bollywood dance teacher and is married to the band's multi-instrumentalist Josh Bennett. The band's male lead, Shourov Bhattacharya, is a second generation Indian-Australian musician and entrepreneur of Bengali descent.

The Bombay Royale released its first album You Me Bullets Love in April 2012 and was chosen as iTunes Breakthrough World Music Album for 2012. In 2013, the band was booked to play at Glastonbury Festival in the U.K. and toured Belgium, France, Germany, Denmark and Sweden.

In January 2014, The Bombay Royale made its U.S. debut, playing at GlobalFEST at Webster Hall in New York City and at The Kennedy Centre in Washington D.C.

It also played at many other major festivals including WOMAD (in Australia, New Zealand and the U.K.), and Sakifo Music Festival in Reunion.

The band released its second music video "Henna Henna" in May 2014 and its second album The Island of Dr Electrico in July 2014 under the HopeStreet Recordings label.

In August 2014, Rolling Stone magazine featured The Bombay Royale in its list of "10 New Artists You Need To Know". A number of the band's tracks were licensed to video game company Ubisoft which featured them in the popular video game Far Cry 4, released in November 2014.

In March 2016, the song "Henna Henna" was featured in the closing scene of episode 6, season 2 of the American TV show "Better Call Saul".

In July 2017, the band released its music video for its single "I Love You Love You" from its new album Run Kitty Run, which was released in August 2017. The band then toured Europe, playing in the Festival du Chant de Marin in France and Sziget Festival in Hungary.

According to a 2021 interview with singer, Parvyn, The Bombay Royale has finished playing.

== Members ==
- Parvyn (vocals-"The Mysterious Lady")
- Shourov Bhattacharya (vocals-"The Tiger")
- Andy Williamson (saxophone-"The Skipper")
- Andre Lobanov (bassist-"The Happy Tripper")
- Tom Martin (guitar-"The Railways Mogul")
- Matt Vehl (synths-"The Bandit Priest")
- Julian Goyma (drums-"The Leaping Shaman")
- Josh Bennett (sitar, tabla, dilruba and guitar-"The Jewel Thief")
- Ed Fairlie (trumpet-"Chip Chase")
- Declan Jones (trumpet-"Dr. Electrico")
- Ros Jones (trombone-"The Kungfu Dentist")

== Discography ==
=== Albums ===
List of albums, with selected details
Title	Details
You Me Bullets Love	Released: April 2012; Format: CD, LP; Label: Hope Street Recordings (HS007)
The Island of Dr Electrico	Released: June 2014; Format: CD, LP; Label: Hope Street Recordings (HS014)
Run Kitty Run	Released: 2017; Format: CD, LP; Label: Hope Street Recordings (HS030)

== Awards and nominations ==
=== Music Victoria Awards ===
The Music Victoria Awards are an annual awards night celebrating Victorian music. They commenced in 2006.

Year	Nominee / work	Award	Result	Ref.
2017	Run Kitty Run	Best Global or Reggae Album	Nominated	
