= 2001 New York Film Critics Circle Awards =

67th New York Film Critics Circle Awards

67th NYFCC Awards

January 6, 2002

Best Film:
Mulholland Dr.

The 67th New York Film Critics Circle Awards, honoring the best in film for 2001, were announced on 13 December 2001 and presented on 6 January 2002 by the New York Film Critics Circle.

== Winners ==
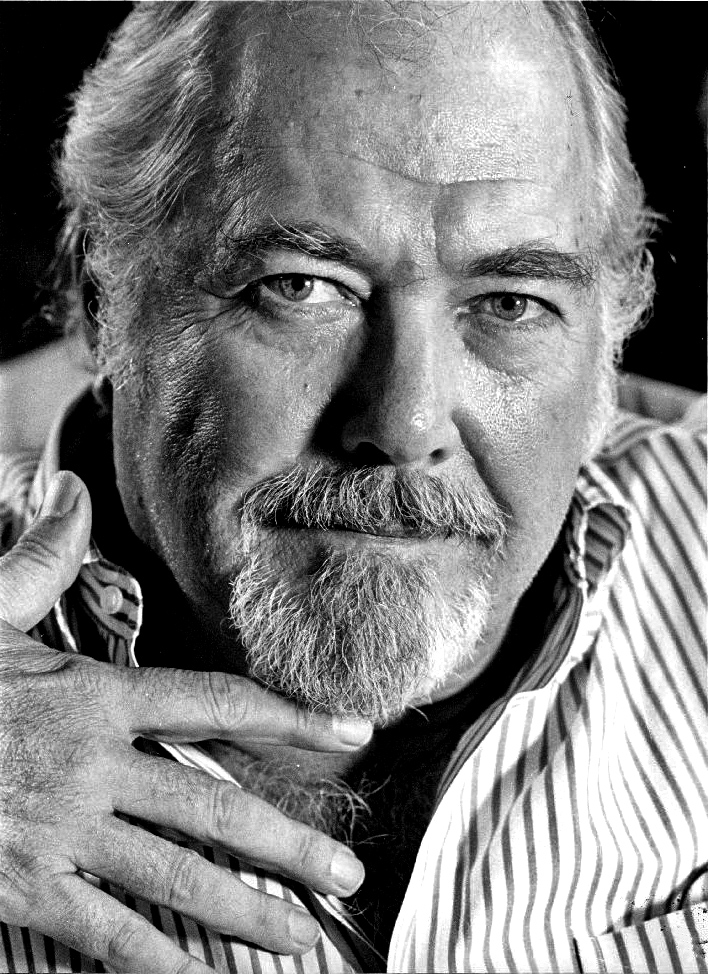
Robert Altman, Best Director winner

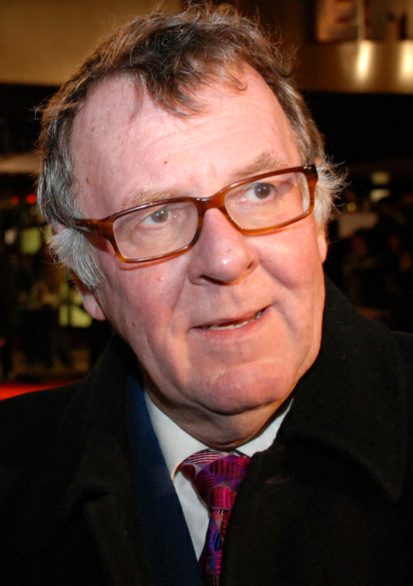
Tom Wilkinson, Best Actor winner

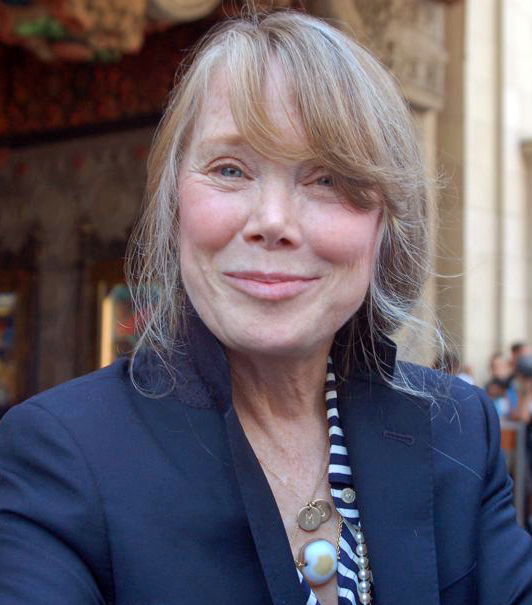
Sissy Spacek, Best Actress winner

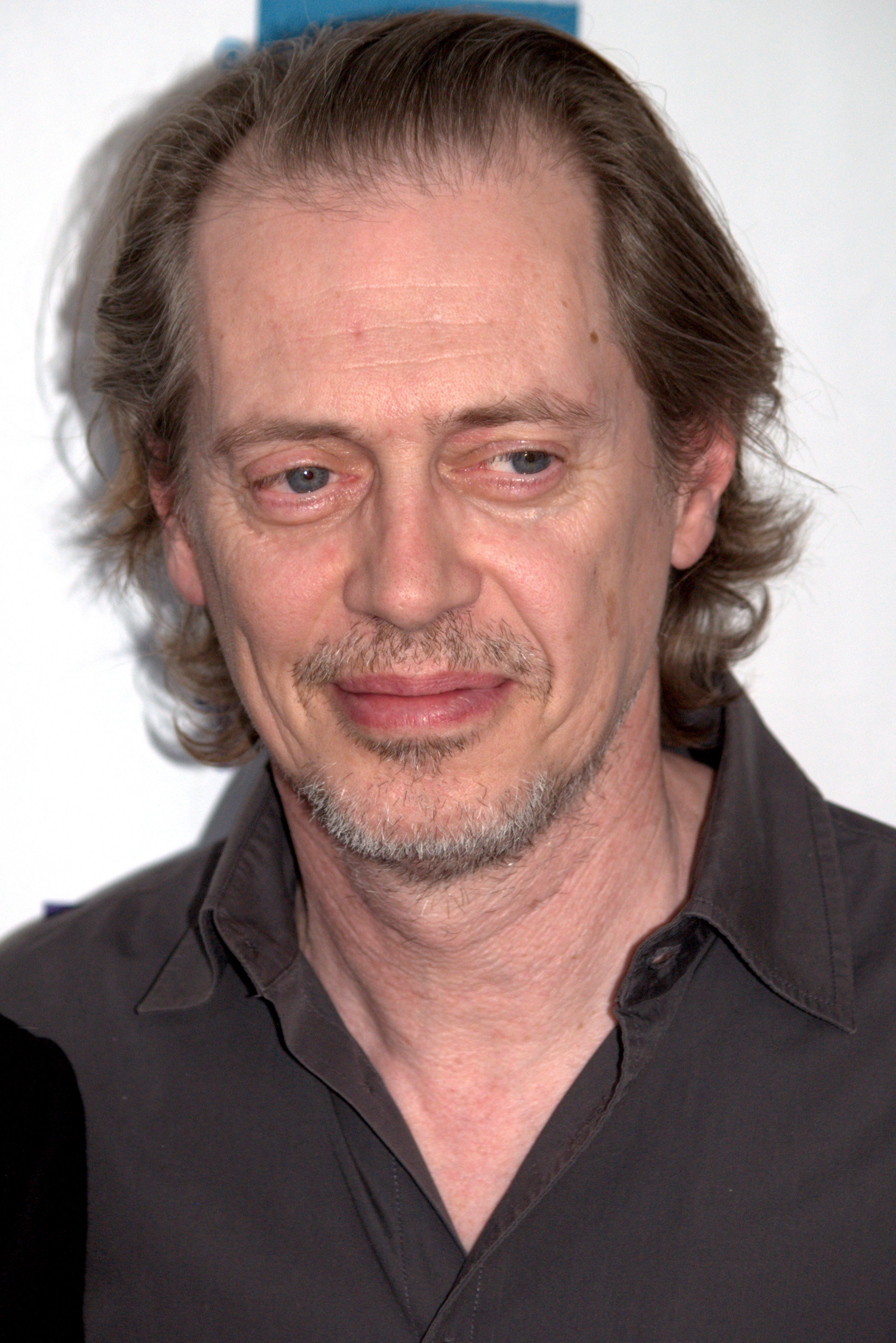
Steve Buscemi, Best Supporting Actor winner

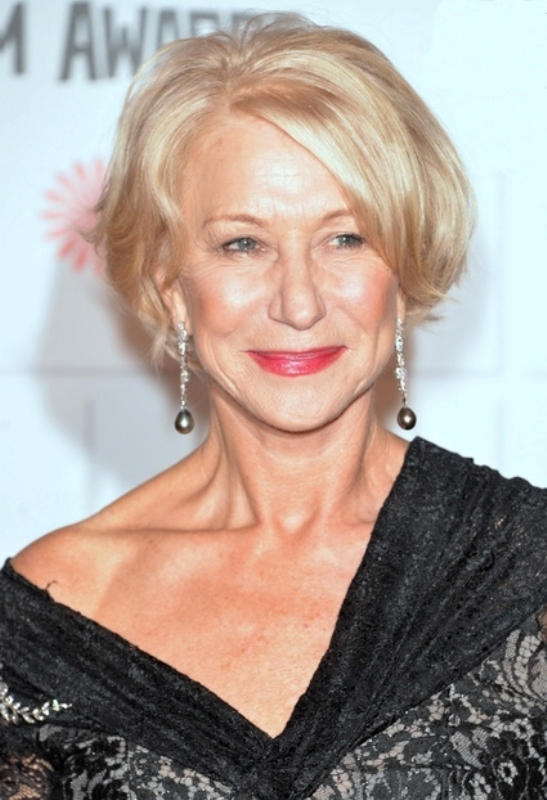
Helen Mirren, Best Supporting Actress winner

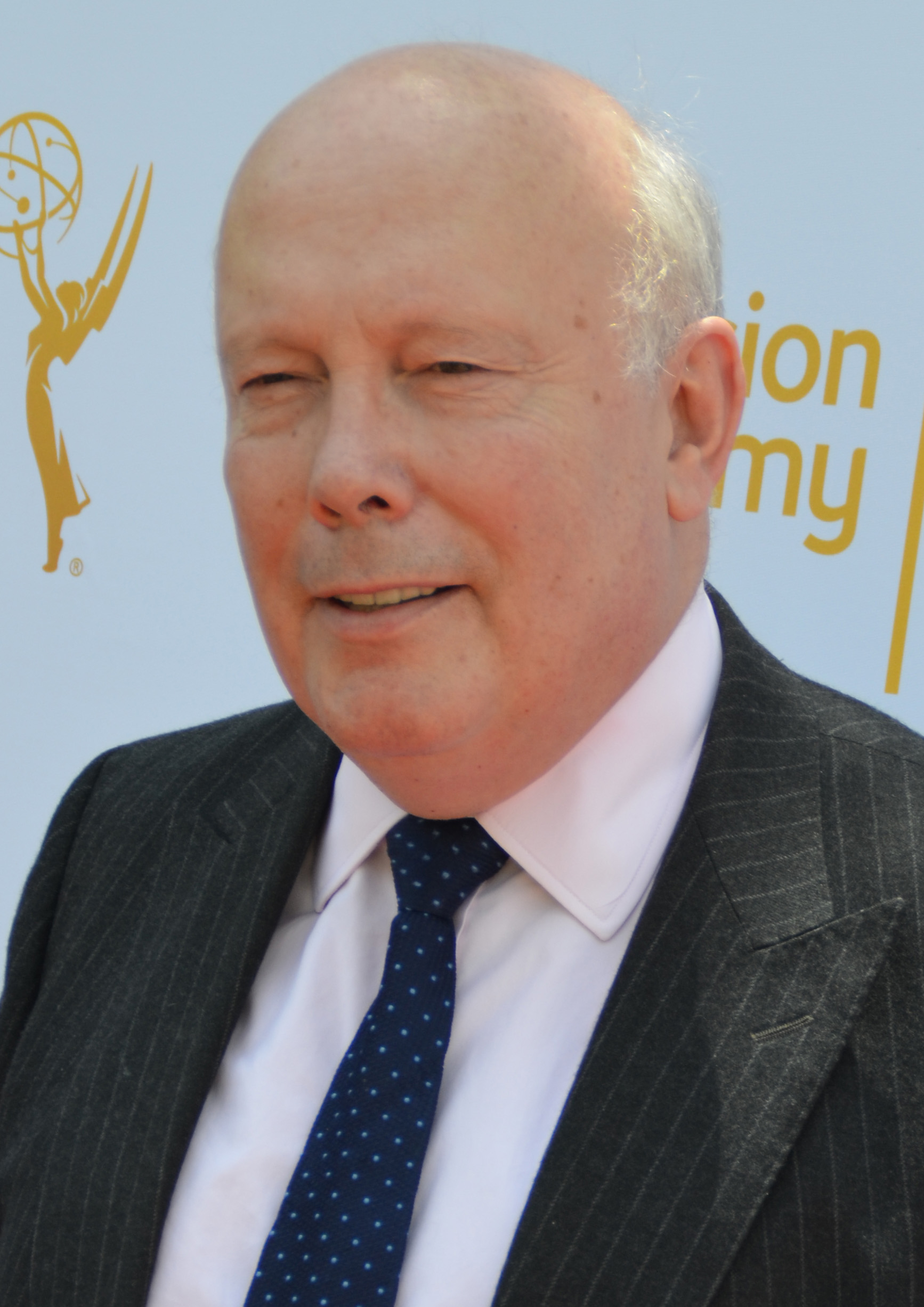
Julian Fellowes, Best Screenplay winner

- Best Actor:
  - Tom Wilkinson – In the Bedroom
  - Runners-up: Jim Broadbent – Iris and Denzel Washington – Training Day
- Best Actress:
  - Sissy Spacek – In the Bedroom
  - Runners-up: Naomi Watts – Mulholland Dr. and Tilda Swinton – The Deep End
- Best Animated Film:
  - Waking Life
  - Runners-up: Shrek and Monsters, Inc.
- Best Cinematography:
  - Christopher Doyle and Pin Bing Lee – In the Mood for Love (Fa yeung nin wa)
  - Runners-up: Roger Deakins – The Man Who Wasn't There and Peter Deming – Mulholland Dr.
- Best Director:
  - Robert Altman – Gosford Park
  - Runners-up: David Lynch – Mulholland Dr. and Todd Field – In the Bedroom
- Best Film:
  - Mulholland Dr.
  - Runners-up: Gosford Park and In the Bedroom
- Best First Film:
  - Todd Field – In the Bedroom
  - Runners-up: Terry Zwigoff – Ghost World, Danis Tanović – No Man's Land, and Jonathan Glazer – Sexy Beast
- Best Foreign Language Film:
  - In the Mood for Love (Fa yeung nin wa) • France/Hong Kong
  - Runners-up: No Man's Land • Bosnia and Herzegovina and Amores perros • Mexico
- Best Non-Fiction Film:
  - The Gleaners and I
  - Runners-up: Startup.com and The Endurance
- Best Screenplay:
  - Julian Fellowes – Gosford Park
  - Runners-up: Christopher Nolan – Memento and Wes Anderson and Owen Wilson – The Royal Tenenbaums
- Best Supporting Actor:
  - Steve Buscemi – Ghost World
  - Runners-up: Ben Kingsley – Sexy Beast and Brian Cox – L.I.E.
- Best Supporting Actress:
  - Helen Mirren – Gosford Park
  - Runners-up: Maggie Smith – Gosford Park and Scarlett Johansson – Ghost World
- Special Award:
  - The restored and re-released Jacques Demy films Lola and Bay of Angels (La baie des anges)
