= Parbatia Banal Panditayan =

- Theatrical release poster
- Directed by: Ramnath Roy
- Written by: Ramnath Roy
- Produced by: Sheetla Prasad Agrahari
- Starring: Girija Mitra; Shiv Agrahari; Laxmi Chhaya; Chandrakala; Kalpana Pandit; Naseem Banu
- Music by: Pratibha Dutt; Usha Mangeshkar; Mahendra Kapoor; Anuradha Paudwal; Dilbar Khan
- Production company: Rajwanta Films
- Release date: 1986
- Running time: 120 minutes
- Country: India
- Language: Bhojpuri

Parbatia Banal Panditayan (English translation - Parbatia turns into a panditayan) is a 1986 Bhojpuri film directed by Ramnath Roy and produced by Sheetla Prasad Agrahari under the banner of Rajwanta Films. The film stars Girija Mitra, Shiv Agrahari, Laxmi Chhaya, Chandrakala, Kalpana Pandit and Naseem Banu. It had music by Pratibha Dutt, lyrics by Ramnath Roy and songs sung by Usha Mangeshkar, Mahendra Kapoor, Anuradha Paudwal and Dilbar Khan.

== Plot ==
A girl named Parbatia who falls in love with Kishan Pandit, a police officer, but they both belong to a different sections of society. Kishan fights for his love and marries her. The climax of the film deals with a twist related to the hidden truth of Parbatia's past life.

== Cast ==
- Girija Mitra as Parbatia
- Shiv Agrahari as Kishan Pandit
- Laxmi Chhaya
- Chandrakala
- Liaqat Ali
- Kalpana Pandit
- Sheetla Prasad Agrahari
- Naseem Banu
- Vandna Shashtri
- Hari Shukla

== Soundtrack ==
Parbatia Banal Panditayin

Soundtrack album by Prativa Dutta
- Released: 1980
- Venue: Mumbai
- Genre: Feature film soundtrack
- Length: 25:40
- Language: Bhojpuri
- Label: The Gramophone Company of India
- Producer: Sheetla Prasad Agrahari

Parbatiya Banal Panditayan has music by Prativa Dutta, with lyrics by Ramnath Roy. The songs were sung by Usha Mangeshkar, Mahendra Kapoor, Dilbar Khan, Anuradha Paudwal and Prativa Dutta.

Track listing
No.	Title	Lyrics	Singer(s)	Length
1.	"Laaj Se Mori Jaye"	Ramnath Roy	Mahendra Kapoor	6:02
2.	"Parbatia Banal Panditayin"	Ramnath Roy	Usha Mangeshkar	3:11
3.	"Darogaji Ho"	Ramnath Roy	Prativa Dutta	3:19
4.	"Charhti Jawani"	Ramnath Roy	Dilbar Khan, Prativa Dutta	3:09
5.	"Piyawa Maan Dailan Hamar"	Ramnath Roy	Usha Mangeshkar	3:17
6.	"Badi Badnami Bhoil"	Ramnath Roy	Mahendra Kapoor, Anuradha Paudwal	3:06
7.	"Chand Tu Ja Kaha"	Ramnath Roy	Dilbar Khan, Prativa Dutta	3:28
Total length:				25:40

== See also ==
- Bhojpuri Film Industry
- List of Bhojpuri films
