= Sharafat Chhod Di Main Ne =

- Directed by: Jagdev Bhambri
- Starring: Feroz Khan; Hema Malini; Neetu Singh
- Music by: Madan Mohan
- Release date: 29 June 1976
- Country: India
- Language: Hindi

Sharafat Chhod Di Main Ne is a 1976 Bollywood film directed by Jagdev Bhambri. The film stars Feroz Khan, Hema Malini, Neetu Singh in pivotal roles. The music was composed by Madan Mohan.

== Cast ==
- Feroz Khan as Raju / Rai Sahib
- Hema Malini as Preeta / Geeta (Double Role)
- Neetu Singh as Radha
- Helen as Dancer / Singer
- Bindu as Dancer / Singer
- Padma Khanna as Dancer / Singer
- Faryal as Dancer / Singer
- Jayshree T. as Dancer / Singer
- Laxmi Chhaya as Dancer / Singer

== Plot ==
Raju and Preetha are in love. But he is disappointed when she marries another man due to pressure from her father. Raju can't take the betrayal and treats every woman as a play thing. Raju moves to the city and befriends Kalu who introduces him to Rai Sahab who runs illegal activities. Rai Sahab soon becomes fond of Raju. Preeta passes away after giving birth to her daughter Radha. Rai Sahab hands his empire to Raju and bestows on him the title Rai Sahab.

Years pass by. Preetha's daughter Radha is now a college student in love with her classmate. She lives with her aunt Geeta, who is Preetha's lookalike and runs an ashram for unwed pregnant girls. At a fund-raising show for Geeta's ashram, Radha performs a dance which her mother used to perform in the village. Raju, a generous donor of the ashram, is in the audience and is flooded by memories. And he gets attracted to the much younger Radha.

== Soundtrack ==
Music composed by Madan Mohan, while all song lyrics are written by Verma Malik.

Song	Singer
"Shyam Salona" - 1	Asha Bhosle
"Shyam Salona" - 2	Asha Bhosle
"Ek Mutthi Mein Dil"	Asha Bhosle
"Meri Gali Mein Saiyan"	Asha Bhosle
"Aaj Ki Mehfil, Aaj Ki Sham"	Asha Bhosle
"Ek Sapna Maine Dekha Hai, Ek Sapna Maine Dekha Hai"	Asha Bhosle, Mohammed Rafi
