= Parvyn =

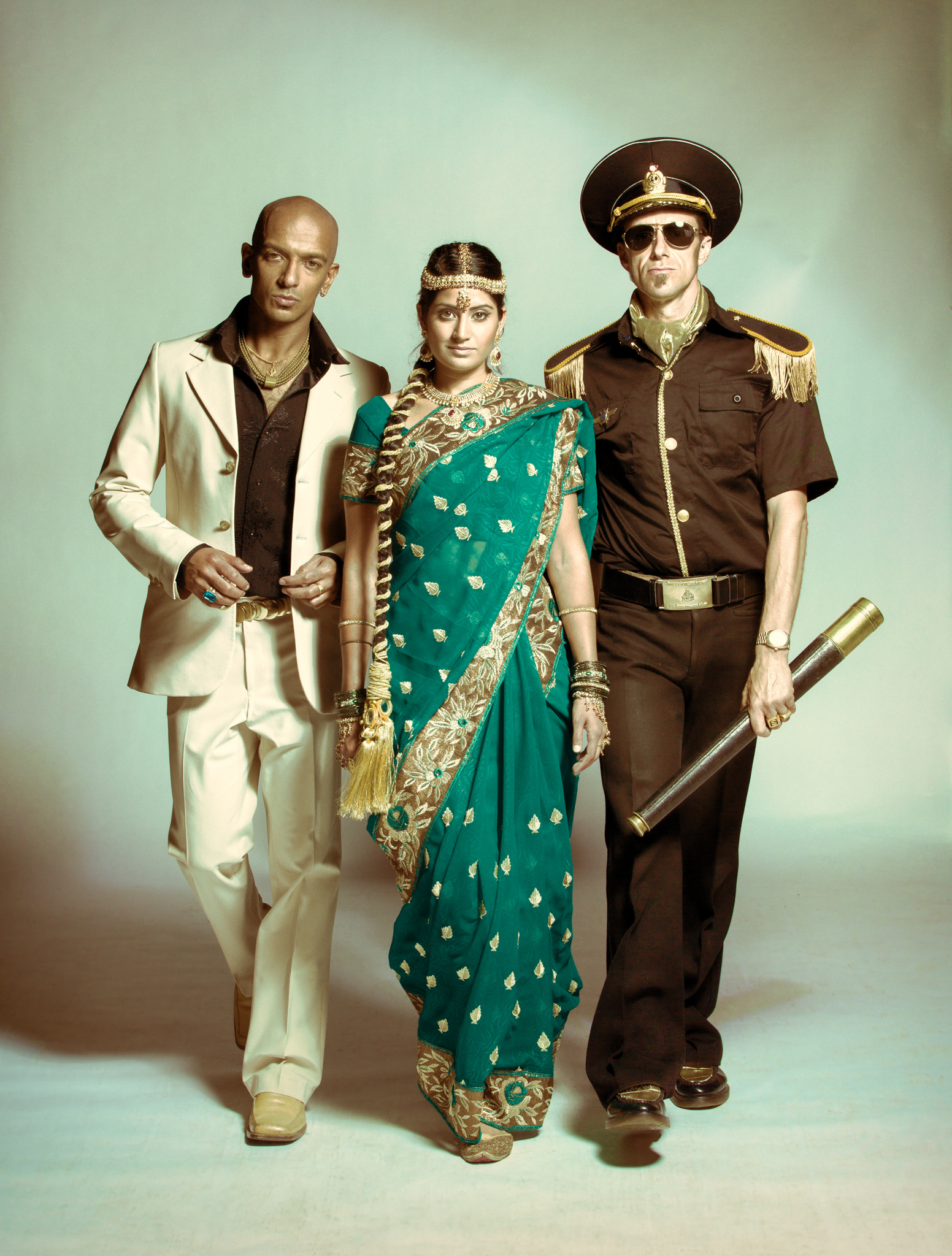
- Parvyn (centre) in 2014

Background information
- Born: Parvyn Kaur Singh
- Genres: World Music
- Occupation: Singer-Dancer
- Formerly of: The Bombay Royale

Parvyn Kaur Singh is an Australian singer and dancer. Her debut album, Sa, was nominated for the 2022 ARIA Award for Best World Music Album.

Parvyn was the frontwoman of Melbourne band The Bombay Royale, from joining them in 2010 through to their finish in 2021. She then started a solo career, releasing Sa in 2021.

Parvyn is also the youngest daughter of world renowned Sikh devotional singer Dya Singh.

Her record 'Maujuda' has been awarded the 'Best Independent Jazz Album or EP' at the @ausindies (Aug 2025).

== Discography ==
=== Albums ===
| Title | Details |
|---|---|
| Sa | Released: September 2021; Label: Parvyn; Format: CD, digital |
| Maujuda | Released: November 2024; Label: Parvyn Bennett; Format: digital |

== Awards ==
=== AIR Awards ===
The Australian Independent Record Awards (commonly known informally as AIR Awards) is an annual awards night to recognise, promote and celebrate the success of Australia's Independent Music sector.

| Year | Nominee / work | Award | Result | Ref. |
|---|---|---|---|---|
| 2025 | Maujuda | Best Independent Heavy Album or EP | Won | |

=== ARIA Music Awards ===
The ARIA Music Awards is an annual awards ceremony that recognises excellence, innovation, and achievement across all genres of Australian music.

| Year | Nominee / work | Award | Result |
|---|---|---|---|
| 2022 | Sa | Best World Music Album | Nominated |
