= Herman Benjamin =

Indian choreographer (1931–1968)

- Born: 1931
- Died: 13 September 1968 (aged 36–37)
- Occupation(s): Choreographer, dancer
- Years active: 1958–1971
- Known for: Choreographing bollywood songs
- Awards: Indian Film Dance Directors Association (2012) (posthumously)

Herman Benjamin (1931 – 13 September 1968) was a choreographer of dance numbers in various Bollywood movies from the late 1950s through to the early 1970s. Also known as "Harman", he started his career as a choreographer in the popular 1958 film Chalti Ka Naam Gaadi. He choreographed a great number of movies featuring Shammi Kapoor. He also appeared onscreen as a dancing extra in several of the songs he choreographed. Among his most well known songs is Jaan Pehechan Ho which he also performed onscreen for the hit 1965 film Gumnaam. The song gained international popularity 36 years later when it was featured in the opening scene of the American movie Ghost World in 2001.

He died in September 1968 and several films he had choreographed dances for released after his death until 1971. The family of Benjamin was among those of other late choreographers that received awards on their behalf from the Indian Film Dance Directors Association (IFDDA) on January 9, 2012, for their contribution to the field of choreography.

== Filmography ==
- 1971 Jawan Muhabat (choreographer - as Late Harman Benjamin)
- 1970 Pagla Kahin Ka (choreographer - as Late Herman)
- 1970 Suhana Safar (choreographer - as Late Herman)
- 1970 Tum Haseen Main Jawan (choreographer - as Late Herman)
- 1969 Prince (choreographer - as Harman)
- 1969 Pyar Hi Pyar (choreographer)
- 1969 Pyar Ka Sapna (dances)
- 1969 Vishwas (choreographer - as Late Herman)
- 1969 Ek Shriman Ek Shrimati (dances - as Late Herman Benjamin)
- 1968 Abhilasha (choreographer - as Herman)
- 1968 Brahmachari (dance director)
- 1968 Izzat (choreographer)
- 1968 Jhuk Gaya Aasman (choreographer - as Harman)
- 1968 Duniya (choreographer - as Herman)
- 1967 Aag (dances - as Harman)
- 1967 Latt Saheb (choreographer - as Herman)
- 1967 Raat Aur Din (choreographer - as Herman)
- 1967 Raaz (choreographer - as Harman Benjamin)
- 1967 Upkar (dances - as Herman)
- 1966 Baharen Phir Bhi Aayengi (dances - as Herman)
- 1966 Do Badan (dances)
- 1966 Rustom Kaun (choreography - as Herman)
- 1966 Teesri Manzil (choreographer - as Harman)
- 1966 Husn Aur Ishq (dances - as Harman)
- 1965 Jab Jab Phool Khile (choreographer)
- 1965 Janwar (dances - as Herman)
- 1965 Mere Sanam (choreographer)
- 1965 Shreeman Funtoosh (choreographer - as Herman)
- 1965 Gumnaam (choreographer - as Herman)
- 1965 Tu Hi Meri Zindagi (dance director - as Herman)
- 1964 Daal Me Kala (choreographer: Vancouver - as Harman Benzamin)
- 1963 Yeh Rastey Hain Pyar Ke (choreographer - as Herman)
- 1961 Jab Pyar Kisise Hota Hai (choreographer: additional choreography - as Herman)
- 1961 Jhumroo (choreographer)
- 1960 Ek Phool Char Kaante (choreographer)
- 1959 Dil Deke Dekho (choreographer - as Herman)
- 1958 Chalti Ka Naam Gaadi
