= Raaste Kaa Patthar =

1972 Indian film by Mukul Dutt

- Directed by: Mukul Dutt
- Written by: Rahi Masoom Reza; Jayant Dharmadhikari
- Produced by: Bolu Khosla; Lekhraj Khosla
- Starring: Amitabh Bachchan; Shatrughan Sinha; Prem Chopra
- Cinematography: Kaka Thakur
- Edited by: Waman Bhosle
- Music by: Laxmikant–Pyarelal
- Release date: 1 December 1972
- Running time: 133 minutes
- Country: India
- Language: Hindi

Raaste Kaa Patthar (transl. Paving Stone) is a 1972 Indian Hindi-language comedy drama film directed by Mukul Dutt. The film stars Amitabh Bachchan, Shatrughan Sinha and Prem Chopra.

== Plot ==
A young bachelor in Bombay, Jai Shankar Rai, lets his superiors use his apartment for their extramarital affairs in hopes of career advancement. He later discovers that the woman he loves is in a relationship with his boss, leading to a personal crisis. His friend Arun is an idealistic, unemployed writer who strictly refuses to compromise his artistic principles or write commercial trash, even when Jai tries to secure him an advertising job. Because he brings in zero income, his household falls into deep poverty.

Out of sheer desperation to keep them afloat, Arun's wife, Tanu (Laxmi Chhaya), begins working as an evening club dancer. While Arun claims to love her, he feels deeply emasculated and bitter, ultimately looking the other way as she leaves every night to face the leering glances of other men for money. Tanu's dancing eventually brings her into contact with wealthy, sleazy men. In a tragic twist of fate, Tanu is brought by one of these clients, Ramesh, to Jai’s apartment. While at the apartment, a bitter confrontation breaks out. Ramesh and his associates are involved in illegal criminal activities and blackmail. Tanu inadvertently becomes a witness to a massive argument regarding their illicit dealings. To prevent any loose ends and keep their operations quiet, the criminals turn violent, and Ramesh is murdered inside the apartment during the chaotic scuffle. Needing a scapegoat to escape the law, the real criminals cleverly manipulate the evidence. Because Tanu was present at the scene and her husband Arun has a visible, angry motive due to her secret life, the corrupt faction frames Arun and Tanu for the crime. A second associate involved in the cover-up is silenced (murdered) by the mastermind of the operation to ensure that no one confesses to the police.

Arun Thakur is framed for the crime, but before any final sentencing or execution can take place, Jai (Amitabh Bachchan) steps forward to testify. Backed by the police investigation, Jai's evidence completely clears Arun and his wife Tanu of all charges, exposing the true killers and saving them from prison.

== Cast ==
- Amitabh Bachchan as Jaishankar Rai
- Neeta Khayani as Neeta Sinha
- Shatrughan Sinha as Arun Thakur
- Laxmi Chhaya as Tanu Thakur
- Prem Chopra as Ranjeet Choudhary
- Asit Sen as Golbadan Chaturvedi
- Satyendra Kapoor as Mr. Kapoor
- Bhagwan as Constable Bhagwan
- Trilok Kapoor
- Asrani as
- Chand Usmani as Mrs. Chaudhary
- Mohan Choti as D'Souza
- Viju Khote as Doctor
- Shivraj as Ahmed

== Soundtrack ==
All songs were written by Anand Bakshi.

Song	Singer
"Main Sharab Bechti Hoon"	Asha Bhosle
"Mujhse Kahan Tu Bachke Jayega"	Asha Bhosle
"Main Hardam Kisi Ko Dhundta Hoon, Mujhe Kisi Ki Khoj Hai"	Asha Bhosle, Mukesh
"Ib Tum Paas Na Aana, Door Hi Rehna, Mohe Dar Lage"	Asha Bhosle, Mukesh
"Raaste Ka Patthar"	Mukesh
