= Laxmi Chhaya =

Indian actress (1948–2004)

- Born: 7 January 1948; Bombay, Province of Bombay, India
- Died: 9 May 2004 (aged 56); Mumbai, Maharashtra, India
- Occupations: Actress; dancer; teacher
- Years active: 1958–1986

Laxmi Chhaya (7 January 1948 – 9 May 2004) was an Indian actress, dancer and teacher, who was known for her distinctive character roles and appearances in Hindi films.

Following a series of roles as a child actor, Chhaya earned recognition for her appearance as a masked dancer in Mohammed Rafi's "Jaan Pehechan Ho", which appeared in the horror film Gumnaam (1965). Her highest-critical successes came with Teesri Manzil (1966), Duniya (1968), Aya Sawan Jhoom Ke (1969), Mera Gaon Mera Desh (1971), and Raaste Kaa Patthar (1972).

Chhaya was active from 1958 to 1986, a period in which she amassed over 100 film credits. She subsequently worked as a dance teacher. In 2004, she died from cancer at the age of 56.

== Career ==
Chhaya began acting with an uncredited appearance as one of the school girls in Talaq (1958). In 1962, She starred in the film Naughty Boy as Bela, her first role that wasn't a cameo.

In 1965, she appeared as a masked dancer in Gumnaam, performing in the song Jaan Pehechan Ho. Her performance gained a cult following across India and America; it has been regarded as her signature work. IndiaTimes Group states: "The enthusiastic dance by Laxmi Chhaya and Herman Benjamin is not something today’s actors will be able to pull off with the same ease and grace." In 1966, Chhaya starred as Meena in the film Teesri Manzil. Starring alongside Shammi Kapoor and Asha Parekh, the film was praised for its songs, as well as its story and ensemble. In 1967, she had made guest appearances in many critically acclaimed films, such as Ram Aur Shyam, Baharon Ke Sapne, Upkar and Raat Aur Din.

In 1968, she starred in Duniya as Laxmi, a role named after her. In 1969, Chhaya next starred as Rita in the film Aya Sawan Jhoom Ke (1969), where she starred in a supporting role once again with Asha Parekh. The movie was a commercial success. In the same year, she starred in the film Pyar Ka Mausam. In 1971, Chhaya starred as Munnibai, a young girl who works undercover for a dacoit, in Mera Gaon Mera Desh, her first role as part of the main cast. The film was a major and critical success at the time, and is considered to be one of Chhaya's best performances.

In 1972, she starred with Amitabh Bachchan in Raaste Kaa Patthar, where she was part of the main cast, and received praise for her dancing in the song "Main Sharaab Bechti Hoon". She starred in the films Do Chor and Bindiya Aur Bandook in the same year. Following these roles, Chhaya made more guest appearances in films such as Do Phool (1973), Sharafat Chod Di Maine (1976), Haiwan (1977), and she also had a guest role in Dhoti Lota Aur Chowpatty (1975), which was known for its extensive cast list. She had a starring role in Paijjecha Vida (1979), which was a box-office flop.

After a series of commercially unsuccessful films, she retired from the film industry in 1987 after a guest appearance in the film Parakh. In the years prior to her death, Chhaya went on to open her own dance school, where she taught dancing to indigent children.

== Death ==
On 9 May 2004, Chhaya died of cancer in Mumbai at the age of 56. Tributes have been published and created in recognition of Chhaya's work in the film industry.

== Selected filmography ==
=== Hindi ===
1. Talaq (1958)
2. Bada Aadmi (1961)
3. Naughty Boy (1962)
4. Umeed (1962)
5. Royal Mail (1963)
6. Holiday In Bombay (1963)
7. Bluff Master (1963)
8. Bhootnath (1963)
9. Zingaro (1963)
10. Roop Sundari (1964)
11. Shehnai (1964)
12. Maharani Padmini (1964)
13. Aandhi Aur Toofan (1964)
14. Tarzan Aur Jalpari (1964)
15. Kohra (1964)
16. Krishnavatar (1964)
17. Gumnaam (1965)
18. Mohabbat Isko Kehete Hain (1965)
19. Panch Ratan (1965)
20. Mere Sanam (1965)
21. Rustum-E-Hind (1965)
22. Maharaja Vikram (1965)
23. Khakaan (1965)
24. Tarzan Comes To Delhi (1965)
25. Sunehra Jaal (1966)
26. Teesri Manzil (1966)
27. Dil Ne Phir Yaad Kiya (1966)
28. Husn Aur Ishq (1966)
29. Ladka Ladki (1966)
30. Shera Daku (1966)
31. Phool Aur Patthar (1966)
32. Alibaba Aur 40 Chor (1966)
33. Jadoo (1966)
34. Dada (1966)
35. Budtameez (1966)
36. Aasra (1966)
37. Ram Aur Shyam (1967)
38. Raaz (1967)
39. Aamne Samne (1967)
40. Wahan Ke Log (1967)
41. Mera Bhai Mera Dushman (1967)
42. Baharon Ke Sapne (1967)
43. Johar In Bombay (1967)
44. Raat Aur Din (1967)
45. Gunehgar (1967)
46. Upkar (1967)
47. Naunihal (1967)
48. Milan Ki Raat (1967)
49. Mohhabat Aur Jung (1967)
50. Shamsher (1967)
51. Izzat (1968)
52. Vaasna (1968)
53. Haye Mera Dil (1968)
54. Gauri (1968)
55. Ek Raat (1968)
56. Duniya (1968)
57. Jung Aur Aman (1968)
58. Suhaag Raat (1968)
59. Kanyadaan (1968)
60. Mere Huzoor (1968)
61. Aya Sawan Jhoom Ke (1969)
62. Pyar Ka Mausam (1969)
63. Bahurupi (1969)
64. Nandini (1969)
65. Hum Ek Hain (1969)
66. Ek Shriman Ek Shrimati (1969)
67. Mere Humsafar (1970)
68. Ek Nanhi Munni Ladki Thi (1970)
69. Yeh Khoon Rang Layega (1970)
70. Chetna (1970)
71. Yaadgaar (1970)
72. My Love (1970)
73. Rootha Na Karo (1970)
74. Veer Ghatotkach (1970)
75. Mera Gaon Mera Desh (1971)
76. Parwana (1971)
77. Patanga (1971)
78. Umeed (1971)
79. Jai Bangladesh (1971)
80. Raaste Kaa Patthar (1972)
81. Do Chor (1972)
82. Kaun Sacha Kaun Jutha (1972)
83. Kundan (1972)
84. Tanhai (1972)
85. Bindiya Aur Bandook (1972)
86. Ek Khiladi Bawan Pattey (1972)
87. Nanha Shikari (1973)
88. Jhoom Utha Akash (1973)
89. Suraj Aur Chanda (1973)
90. Kora Aanchal (1973)
91. Do Phool (1974)
92. Hamrahi (1974)
93. Mera Vachan Geeta Ki Qasam (1974)
94. Dhoti Lota Aur Chowpatty (1975)
95. Daaku (1975)
96. Badnaam (1975)
97. Mounto (1975)
98. Sharafat Chod Di Maine (1976)
99. Kasam (1976)
100. Alibaba (1976)
101. Haiwan (1977)
102. Ooparwala Jaane (1977)
103. Hatyara (1977)
104. Kanoon Ka Shikar (1978)
105. Teen Eekay (1979)
106. Nagin Aur Suhagan (1979)
107. Chattis Nakhrewali (1980)
108. Sanjh Ki Bela (1980)
109. Tu Meri Main Tera (1980)
110. Raakh Aur Chingari (1982)
111. Bheegi Palkein (1982)
112. Kaun Hai Woh (1983)
113. Ek Baar Chale Aao (1983)
114. Pyar Bina Jag Soona (1985)
115. Parakh (1987)

=== Marathi ===
1. Tevde Sodun Bola (1974)
2. Paijech Vida (1979)
3. Javayachi Jaat (1979)
4. Didh Shane (1979)
5. Darodekhor (1980)
6. Ram Ram Amatharam (1981)
7. Chorachya Manat Chandane (1984)
8. Jagavegali Prem Kahani (1984)
9. Bijli (1986)
10. Bola Dajiba (1987)

=== Gujrati ===
1. Jai Ranchhod (1975)
2. Chandu Jamadar (1977)
3. Vanjari Vav (1977)

=== Bhojpuri ===
1. Dangal (1977)
2. Dharti Maiya (1981)
3. Parbatia Banal Panditayan (1986)

=== Telugu ===
1. Prem Nagar (1971)
