= You Me Bullets Love =

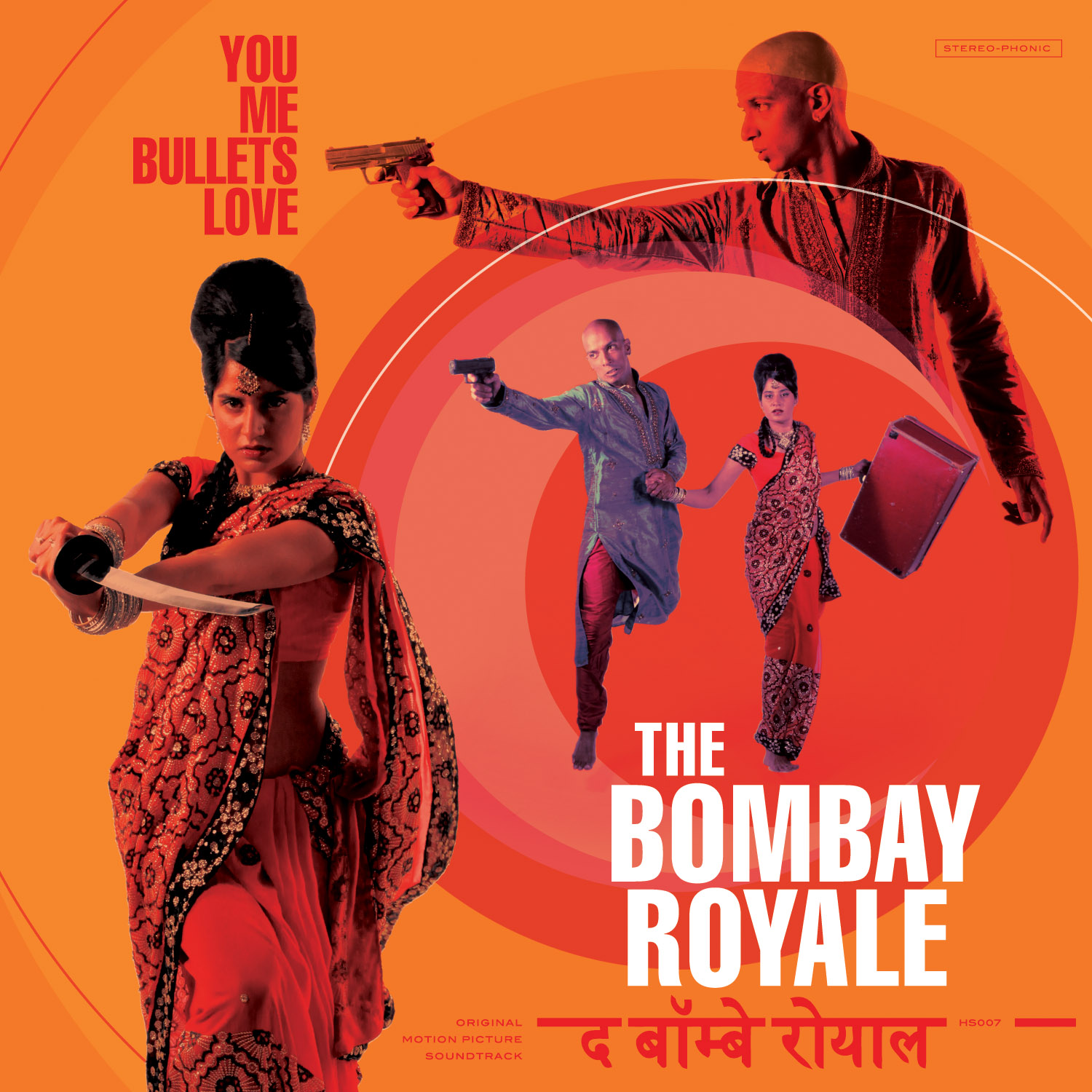

Studio album by The Bombay Royale
- Released: April 2012
- Genre: Bollywood, film music
- Language: English, Hindi, Bengali
- Label: HopeStreet Recordings

The Bombay Royale chronology
You Me Bullets Love (2012)	The Island of Dr Electrico (2014)

You Me Bullets Love is the first album by The Bombay Royale released in 2012 and was chosen as iTunes Breakthrough World Music Album for 2012. In terms of tracks, the album features "eight originals and two classic Bollywood covers". The title track was featured in the video game Far Cry 4.

== Track listing ==
No.	Title	Length
1.	"Monkey Fight Snake"
2.	"You Me Bullets Love"
3.	"Jaan Pehechan Ho"
4.	"Sote Sote Adhi Raat"
5.	"The Perfect Plan"
6.	"Bobbywood"
7.	"Mahindra Death Ride"
8.	"Oh Sajna"
9.	"Dacoit's Choice"
10.	"Phone Baje Na"
