= HopeStreet Recordings =

Independent record label based in Melbourne, Australia

Hopestreet Recordings is an independent record label based in Melbourne, Australia founded in 2009.

== Discography ==
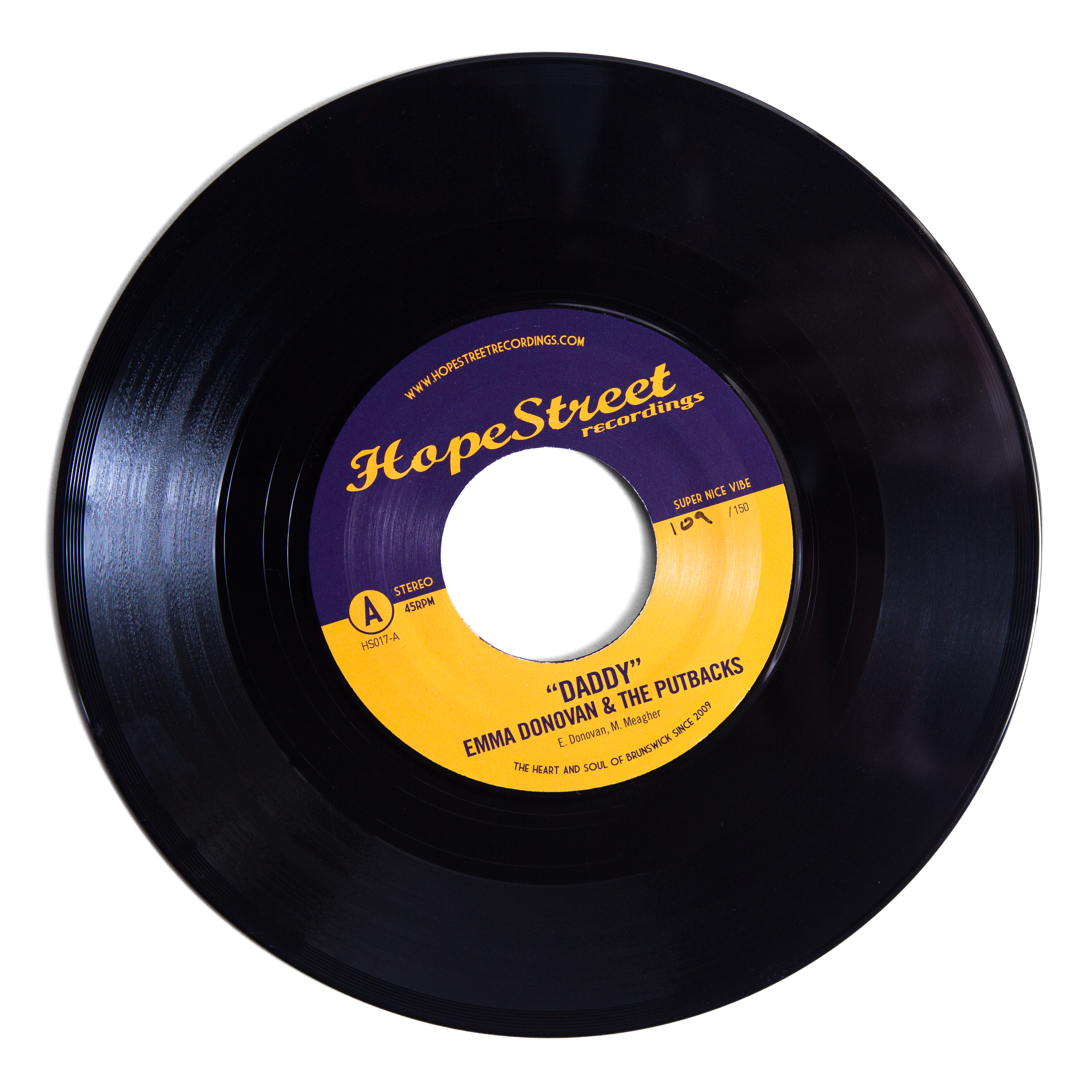
Hopestreet Recordings 7" single "Daddy" by Emma Donovan & The Putbacks (2014)

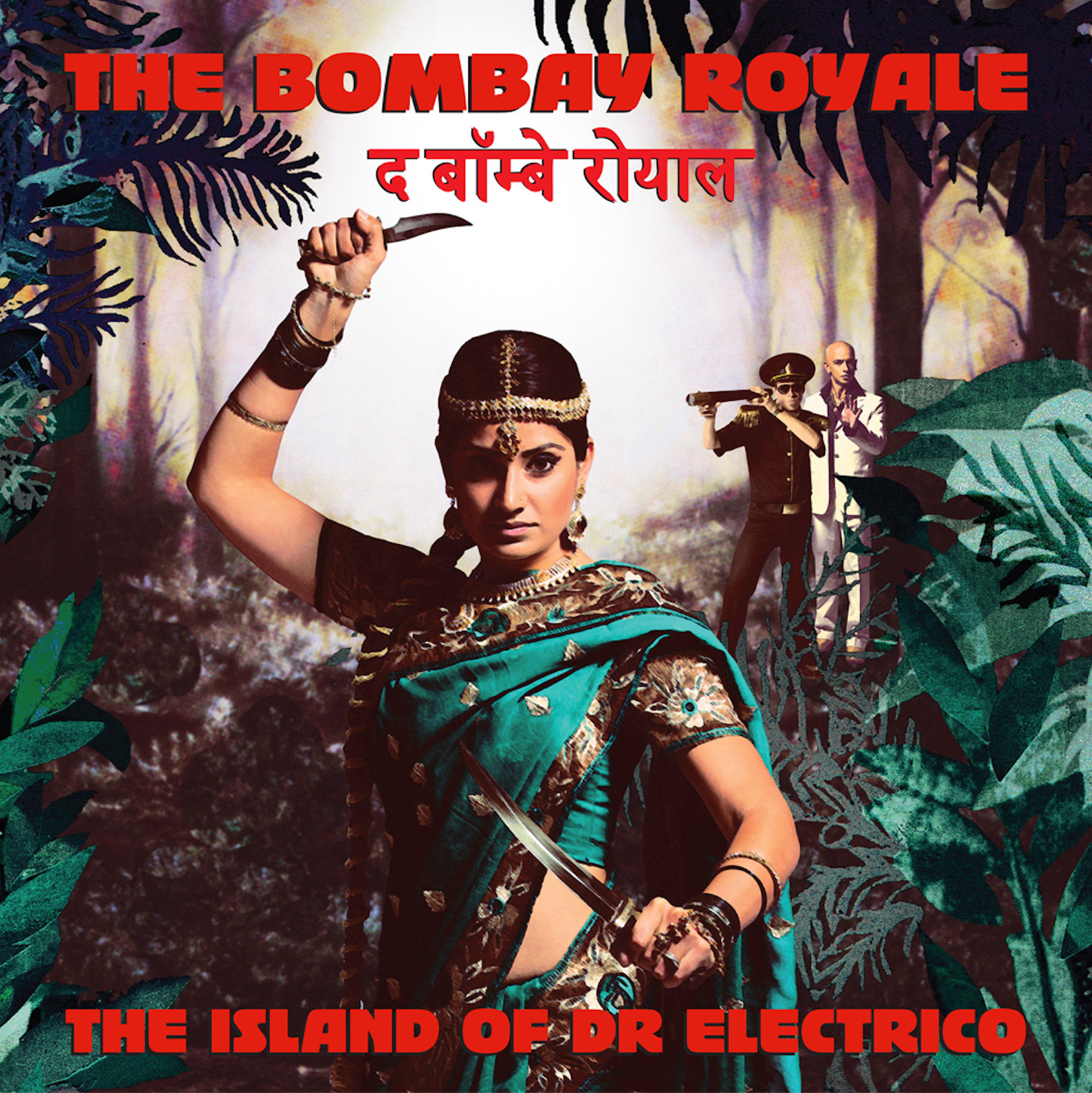
Album Cover - The Island of Dr Electrico

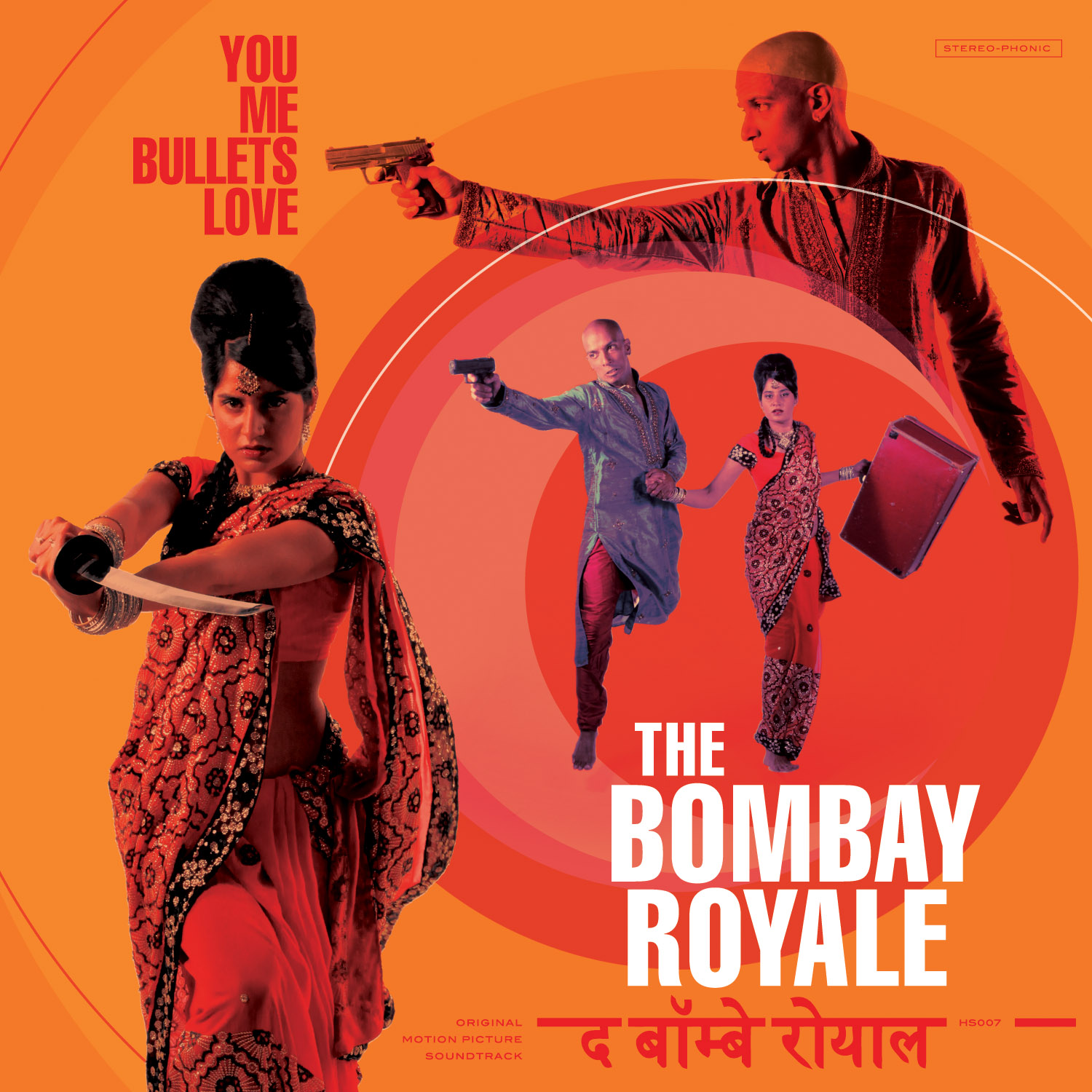
Album Cover - You Me Bullets Love

Artist	Title	Catalog number	Release date
Chantal Mitvalsky & The Putbacks	Friend Or Foe / Diamond Cutter 7"	HS001	2009
The Putbacks	Busted / Set Me Free 7"	HS002	2010
The Cactus Channel	Pepper Snake / The Dap 7"	HS003	2011
The Bombay Royale	Sote Sote / Solla Solla 7"	HS004	2011
The Public Opinion Afro Orchestra	Mr Clean 7"	HS005	2011
The Cactus Channel	Emanuel Ciccolini / Budokan 7"	HS006	2012
The Bombay Royale	You Me Bullets Love LP	HS007	2012
The Cactus Channel	Haptics LP	HS008	2012
Zillanova	Suicide / The Time It Takes 7"	HS009	2013
The Bombay Royale	Phone Baje Na Remix 12"	HS010	2013
The Cactus Channel	Wooden Boy LP	HS011	2013
The Putbacks feat. Nai Palm	Spanish Harlem / The Worm 7"	HS012	2014
San Lazaro	Serendipity LP	HS013	2014
The Bombay Royale	The Island Of Dr Electrico LP	HS014	2014
Emma Donovan & The Putbacks	Dawn LP	HS015	2014
The Public Opinion Six feat. One Sixth & Lamine Sonko	Cosmetic Love / Jappo 7"	HS016	2015
Emma Donovan & The Putbacks	Daddy / In The Dirt 7"	HS017	2014
The Meltdown	Better Days EP	HS018	2015
The Cactus Channel	Cobaw / Fool's Gold 7"	HS019	2015
Quarter Street	Quarter Street LP	HS020	2015
The Bombay Royale	Wild Stallion Mountain / Khubsoorat Bewafa 7"	HS021	2015
The Putbacks	Kung Fu Pyramids / Snake Eyes 7"	HS022	2015
Emma Donovan & The PutBacks feat. Archie Roach, Tim Rogers & Joelistics	Blackfella Whitefella / Down City Streets 7"	HS023	2015
The Meltdown	The Meltdown LP	HS024	2017
San Lazaro	La Despedida LP	HS025	2016
The Cactus Channel feat. Chet Faker	Kill The Doubt / Sleeping Alone 7"	HS026	2015
Leisure Centre	One Plus One EP	HS027	2016
The Cactus Channel	Do It For Nothing LP	HS028	2017
Zillanova	The Fader EP	HS029	2017
The Bombay Royale	Run Kitty Run LP	HS030	2017
The Cactus Channel	Stay A While LP	HS031	2017
The Public Opinion Afro Orchestra	Naming & Blaming LP	HS032	2018
Leisure Centre	Mind Full LP	HS033	2018
The Putbacks	The Putbacks LP	HS034	2018
Izy	Irene LP	HS035	2019
Karate Boogaloo	KB's Mixtape No. 2 LP	HS036	2019
Various Artists	Over Under Away LP	HS037	2019
Love Songs & D	Coming Up	HS038	2019
Danielle Ponder and Karate Boogaloo	Look Around EP	HS039	2020
Emma Donovan and The Putbacks	Crossover LP	HS040	2020
Zretro	Zretro LP	HS041	2022
Erin Buku	Lessons in Love EP	HS042	2022
The Meltdown	It's A Long Road LP	HS043	2022
Hannah Macklin	Mu LP	HS044	2023
Immy Owusu	LO-LIFE! LP	HS045	2023
Ella Thompson	Domino LP	HS046	2023

== Artists ==
- The Putbacks
- The Bombay Royale
- The Cactus Channel
- Emma Donovan
- Quarter Street
- Zillanova
- San Lazaro
- The Meltdown
- The Public Opinion Afro Orchestra
- Erin Buku
- Zretro
- Immy Owusu
- Karate Boogaloo
- Love Songs & D
- Izy
- Leisure Centre
- Ella Thompson
- Immy Owusu
- Hannah Macklin
