= The Island of Dr Electrico =

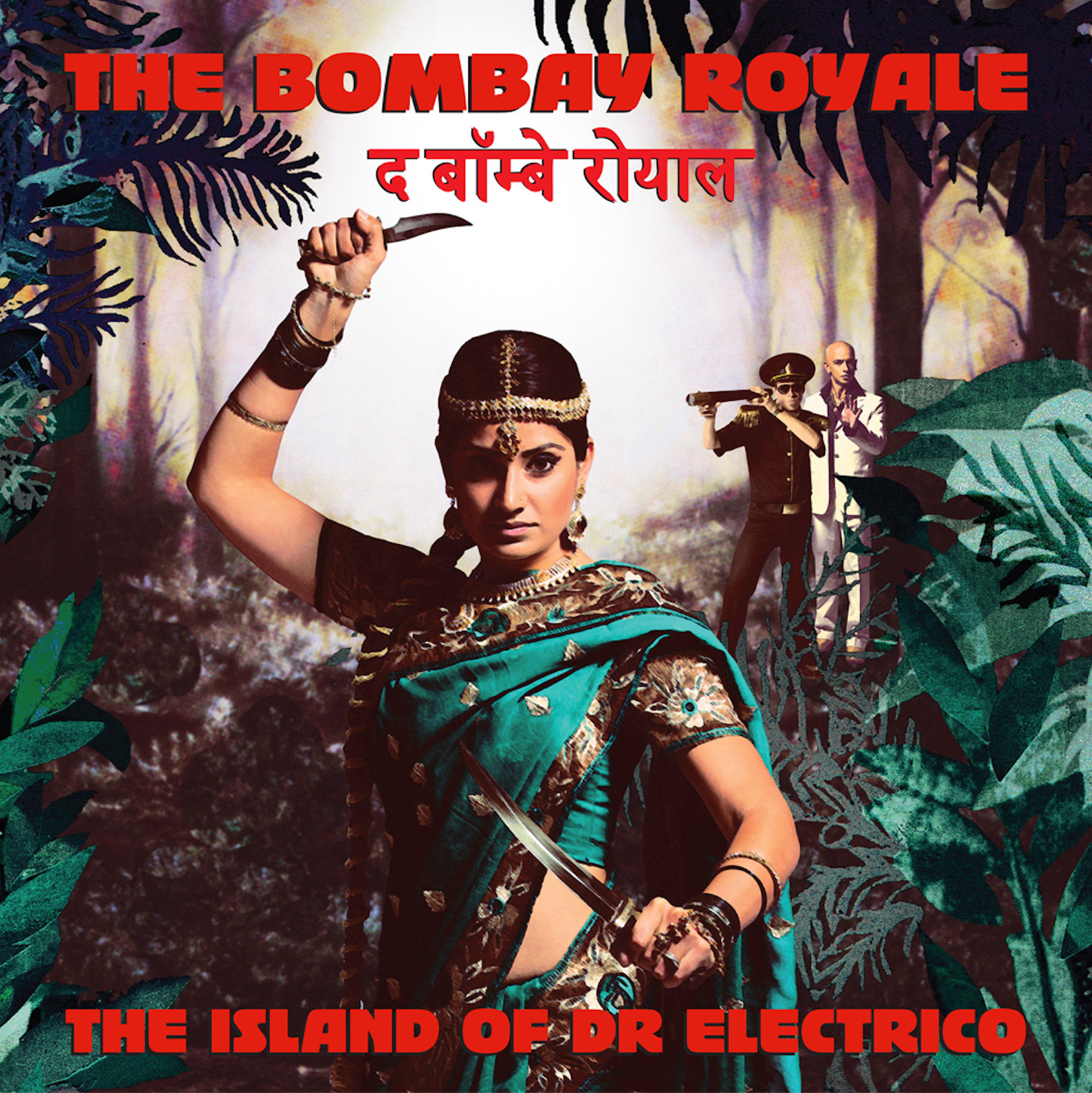

Studio album by The Bombay Royale
- Released: 22 June 2014
- Genre: Disco, funk, surf music, folk
- Language: English, Hindi, Bengali
- Label: HopeStreet Recordings

The Bombay Royale chronology
You Me Bullets Love (2012)	The Island of Dr Electrico (2014)	Run Kitty Run (2017)

The Island of Dr Electrico is the second album by The Bombay Royale released in 2014 following the success of 2012's debut You Me Bullets Love which was chosen as iTunes Breakthrough World Music Album for 2012. “The Island of Dr. Electrico is wickedly delightful combination of disco, surf and funk.” – CBC music A number of the tracks from the album are featured in the popular video game Far Cry 4, released in November 2014. The song "Henna Henna" was used in the sixth episode of the second season of the Better Call Saul TV series.

== Track listing ==
No.	Title	Length
1.	"Ankhiyan"
2.	"Wild Stallion Mountain"
3.	"Khubsoorat Bewafa"
4.	"Henna Henna"
5.	"Tere Bina"
6.	"Hooghly Night Patrol"
7.	"(Give Me Back My) Bunty Bunty"
8.	"Gyara 59"
9.	"The Bombay Twist"
10.	"The Island Of Dr Electrico"
11.	"Falcon's Landing"
12.	"The River"
