= Jaan Pehechan Ho =

Song by Mohammed Rafi

from the album Gumnaam
- Released: 1965
- Genre: Bollywood, filmi, Indian rock, rock and roll
- Length: 5:38
- Songwriters: Composer: Shankar Jaikishan; Lyrics: Shailendra
- Producer: Shankar Jaikishan

"Jaan Pehechan Ho" (transl. Let's Know Each Other) is an Indian rock & roll Bollywood song, sung by Mohammed Rafi, composed by duo Shankar Jaikishan, and with Hindi-Urdu lyrics by Shailendra. It was produced for the 1965 Bollywood film Gumnaam, directed by Raja Nawathe, produced by N.N. Sippy, and starring Manoj Kumar, Nanda, Pran and Dhumal. The song has been widely "remediated" in North American circulation.

== Music video ==
"Jaan Pehechan Ho" as seen in Ghost World

The song's music video was shot in a disco and features Laxmi Chhaya as the dancer and Herman Benjamin the choreographer as the lead singer.

== Popular culture ==
The song first entered American popular culture when The Cramps appeared on the Los Angeles TV show Request Video in the early 1990s, and aired a clip of "Jaan Pehechan Ho" during their appearance on the show. It gained additional exposure through 1994 live performances of the song by Heavenly Ten Stems, an American experimental indie rock band that was based in San Francisco.

The song appears in the opening credits of the 2001 movie Ghost World. In an interview, Ghost World writer Daniel Clowes mentions that he obtained his 20th generation copy of the scene from someone who had been housesitting for Peter Holsapple, guitarist and songwriter for The dB's, and he copied it from Peter's collection. Then they approached the sons of the producers and acquired the rights to use the song in the movie. The Ghost World DVD features the entire musical segment from the movie.

The song was also used for Heineken's 2011 "The Date" commercial.

In 2012, a cover of the song was included by The Bombay Royale in their debut album You Me Bullets Love.

English indie rock band White Lies refer to the song in their music video for their 2013 single "There Goes Our Love Again".

In the 2014 video game Far Cry 4, by Ubisoft, the song is heard playing when the character storms the main antagonist's fortress.

The song, with similar costumes and choreography, also appears in the Cullberg Ballet's rendition of Ekman’s Triptych.

It was featured in the 2017 film Basmati Blues and in the 2019 Bollywood film Luka Chuppi.

In 2019 the song was covered by Olivia Jean on her album Night Owl.
