= Hindi film music =

Songs featuring in Hindi films

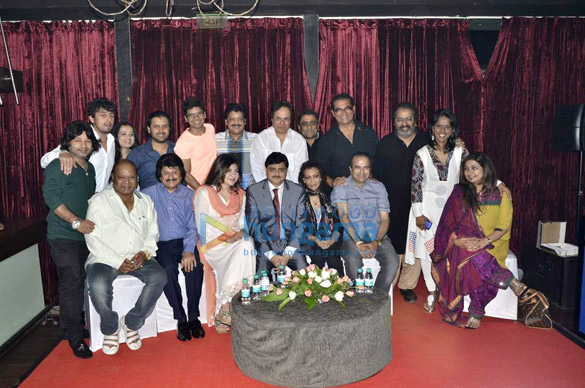
A group of Bollywood at the Indian Singers' Rights Association (ISRA) meet in 2013. Standing (L to R) Kailash Kher, Sonu Nigam, Sowmya Raoh, Javed Ali, Shaan, Udit Narayan, Manhar Udhas, Kunal Ganjawala, Abhijeet Bhattacharya, Hariharan, Mahalaxmi Iyer, Sitting (L to R) Mohammed Aziz, Pankaj Udhas, Alka Yagnik, Sanjay Tandon, Chitra Singh, Suresh Wadkar, Mitali Singh.

Hindi film songs, more formally known as Hindi Geet or Filmi songs and informally known as Bollywood music, are songs featured in Hindi films. Derived from the song-and-dance routines common in Indian films, Bollywood songs, along with dance, are a characteristic motif of Hindi cinema which gives it enduring popular appeal, cultural value and context. Hindi film songs form a predominant component of Indian pop music, and derive their inspiration from both classical and modern sources. Hindi film songs are now firmly embedded in North India's popular culture and routinely encountered in North India in marketplaces, shops, during bus and train journeys and numerous other situations. Though Hindi films routinely contain many songs and some dance routines, they are not musicals in the Western theatrical sense; the music-song-dance aspect is an integral feature of the genre akin to plot, dialogue and other parameters.

The first song recorded in India by Gauhar Jaan in 1902 and the first Bollywood film Alam Ara (1931) were under Saregama, India's oldest music label currently owned by RP-Sanjiv Goenka Group. Linguistically, Bollywood songs tend to use vernacular Hindustani, mutually intelligible to self-identified speakers of both Hindi and Urdu, while modern Bollywood songs also increasingly incorporate elements of Hinglish. Urdu poetry has had a particularly strong impact on Bollywood songs, where the lyrics draw heavily from Urdu poetry and the ghazal tradition. In addition, Punjabi is also occasionally used for Bollywood songs.

The Indian Music Industry is largely dominated by Bollywood soundtracks, which account for nearly 80% of the country's music revenue. The industry was dominated by cassette tapes in the 1980s and 1990s, before transitioning to online streaming in the 2000s (bypassing CD and digital downloads). As of 2014, the largest Indian music record label is T-Series with up to 35% share of the Indian market, followed by Sony Music India (the largest foreign-owned label) with up to 25% share, and then Zee Music (which has a partnership with Sony). As of 2017, 216 million Indians use music streaming services such as YouTube, Hungama, Gaana and JioSaavn. As of 2021, T-Series is the most subscribed YouTube channel with over 170 million subscribers.

== History ==
Hindi film songs are present in Hindi cinema right from the first sound film Alam Ara (1931) by Ardeshir Irani which featured seven songs. This was closely followed by Shirheen Farhad (1931) by Jamshedji Framji Madan, also by Madan, which had as many as 42 song sequences strung together in the manner of an opera, and later by Indra Sabha which had as many as 69 song sequences. However, the practice subsided and subsequent films usually featured between six and ten songs in each production.

Right from the advent of Indian cinema in 1931, musicals with song numbers have been a regular feature in Indian cinema. In 1934 Hindi film songs began to be recorded on gramophones and later, played on radio channels, giving rise to a new form of mass entertainment in India which was responsive to popular demand. Within the first few years itself, Hindi cinema had produced a variety of films which easily categorised into genres such as "historicals", "mythologicals", "devotional, "fantasy" etc. but each having songs embedded in them such that it is incorrect to classify them as "musicals".

The Hindi song was such an integral features of Hindi mainstream cinema, besides other characteristics, that post-independence alternative cinema, of which the films of Satyajit Ray are an example, discarded the song and dance motif in its effort to stand apart from mainstream cinema.

The Hindi film song now began to make its presence felt as a predominating characteristic in the culture of the nation and began to assume roles beyond the limited purview of cinema. In multi-cultural India, as per film historian Partha Chatterjee, "the Hindi film song cut through all the language barriers in India, to engage in lively communication with the nation where more than twenty languages are spoken and ... scores of dialects exist". Bollywood music has drawn its inspiration from numerous traditional sources such as Ramleela, nautanki, tamasha and Parsi theatre, as well as from the West, Pakistan, and other Indic musical subcultures.

For over five decades, these songs formed the staple of popular music in South Asia and along with Hindi films, was an important cultural export to most countries around Asia and wherever the Indian diaspora had spread. The spread was galvanised by the advent of cheap plastic tape cassettes which were produced in the millions until the industry crashed in 2000. Even today Hindi film songs are available on radio, on television, as live music by performers, and on media, both old and new such as cassette tapes, compact disks and DVDs and are easily available, both legally and illegally, on the internet.

== Style and format ==
The various use of languages in Bollywood songs can be complex. Most use variations of Hindi and Urdu, with some songs also including other languages such as Persian, and it is not uncommon to hear the use of English words in songs from modern Hindi movies. Besides Hindi, several other Indian languages have also been used including Braj, Avadhi, Bhojpuri, Punjabi, Bengali and Rajasthani.

In a film, music, both in itself and accompanied with dance, has been used for many purposes including "heightening a situation, accentuating a mood, commenting on theme and action, providing relief and serving as interior monologue."

In a modern globalisation standpoint, Bollywood music has many non-Indian influences, especially from the West. Many Hindi film music composers learned and mimicked Hollywood's style of matching music to scene atmospheres into their own film songs, the result being Bollywood music. These songs can be considered a combination of Western influences and Hindi music.

== Production ==
Songs in Bollywood movies are deliberately crafted with lyrics often written by distinguished poets or literati (often different from those who write the film script), and these lyrics are often then set to music, carefully choreographed to match the dance routine or script of the film. They are then sung by professional playback singers and lip-synched by the actors. Bollywood cinema is unique in that the majority of songs are seen to be sung by the characters themselves rather than being played in the background. Although protagonists sing often, villains in films do not sing because music and the arts are a sign of humanity. In Western cinema, often a composer who specialises in film music is responsible for the bulk of music on the film's soundtrack, and while in some films songs may play an important part (and have direct relationship to the subject of the film), in Bollywood films, the songs often drive large-scale production numbers featuring elaborate choreography.

The key figure in Bollywood music production and composition is the music director. While in Western films, a "music director" or "music coordinator" is usually responsible for selecting existing recorded music to add to the soundtrack, typically during opening and closing credits, in Bollywood films, the "music director" often has a much broader role encompassing both composing music/songs specifically for the film and (if needed) securing additional (licensed) music. In this sense, a Bollywood music director also plays the role of a composer and music producer.

The lyricist of Bollywood songs is less likely to be the same composer or music director, as Bollywood films often go to great lengths to include lyrics of special significance and applicability to the film's plot and dialogue, and/or the words of highly regarded poets/lyricists set to music written specifically for such words in the film, as noted above.

Bollywood film songs have been described as eclectic both in instrumentation and style. They often employ foreign instruments and rework existing songs, showing remarkable inventiveness in the reinvention of melodies and instrumental techniques.

Bollywood film songs often tend to be accompanied by expensive music videos. Some are among the most expensive music videos of all time. The most expensive Indian music video is "Party All Night" (for the 2013 film Boss), which cost ₹60 million ($1.02 million) to produce. Adjusted for inflation, the most expensive Indian music video was "Pyar Kiya To Darna Kya" (for the 1960 film Mughal-e-Azam), which at the time cost more than ₹1.5 million ($320,000), equivalent to $3 million (₹290 million) adjusted for inflation.

== Genres ==
=== Dance ===
Hindi dance music encompasses a wide range of songs predominantly featured in the Bollywood film industry with a growing worldwide attraction. The music became popular among overseas Indians in countries such as South Africa, the United Kingdom and the United States and eventually developed a global fan base.

=== Disco ===
In the Indian subcontinent of South Asia, disco peaked in popularity in the early 1980s, when a South Asian disco scene arose, popularised by filmi Bollywood music, at a time when disco's popularity had declined in North America. The South Asian disco scene was sparked by the success of Pakistani pop singer Nazia Hassan, working with Indian producer Biddu, with the hit Bollywood song "Aap Jaisa Koi" in 1980. Biddu himself previously had success in the Western world, where he was considered a pioneer, as one of the first successful disco producers in the early 1970s, with hits such as the hugely popular "Kung Fu Fighting" (1974), before the genre's Western decline at the end of the 1970s led to him shifting his focus to Asia. The success of "Aap Jaisa Koi" in 1980 was followed by Nazia Hassan's Disco Deewane, a 1981 album produced by Biddu, becoming Asia's best-selling pop album at the time.

In parallel to the Euro disco scene at the time, the continued relevance of disco in South Asia and the increasing reliance on synthesizers led to experiments in electronic disco, often combined with elements of Indian music. Biddu had already used electronic equipment such as synthesizers in some of his earlier disco work, including "Bionic Boogie" from Rain Forest (1976), "Soul Coaxing" (1977), Eastern Man and Futuristic Journey (recorded from 1976 to 1977), and "Phantasm" (1979), before using synthesizers for his later work with Nazia Hassan, including "Aap Jaisa Koi" (1980), Disco Deewane (1981) and "Boom Boom" (1982). Bollywood disco producers who used electronic equipment such as synthesizers include R.D. Burman, on songs such as "Dhanno Ki Aankhon Mein" (Kitaab, 1977) and "Pyaar Karne Waale" (Shaan, 1980); Laxmikant–Pyarelal, on songs such as "Om Shanti Om" (Karz, 1980); and Bappi Lahari, on songs such as "Ramba Ho" (Armaan, 1981). They also experimented with minimalist, high-tempo, electronic disco, including Burman's "Dil Lena Khel Hai Dildar Ka" (Zamane Ko Dikhana Hai, 1981), which had a "futuristic electro feel", and Lahiri's "Yaad Aa Raha Hai" (Disco Dancer, 1982).

Such experiments eventually culminated in the work of Charanjit Singh, whose 1982 record Synthesizing: Ten Ragas to a Disco Beat anticipated the sound of acid house music, years before the genre arose in the Chicago house scene of the late 1980s. Using the Roland TR-808 drum machine, TB-303 bass synthesizer, and Jupiter-8 synthesizer, Singh increased the disco tempo up to a "techno wavelength" and made the sounds more minimalistic, while pairing them with "mystical, repetitive, instrumental Indian ragas", to produce a new sound, which resembled acid house. According to Singh: "There was lots of disco music in films back in 1982. So I thought why not do something different using disco music only. I got an idea to play all the Indian ragas and give the beat a disco beat – and turn off the tabla. And I did it. And it turned out good." The first track "Raga Bhairavi" also had a synthesised voice that says "Om Namah Shivaya" through a vocoder.

Along with experiments in electronic disco, another experimental trend in Indian disco music of the early 1980s was the fusion of disco and psychedelic music. Due to 1960s psychedelic rock, popularised by the Beatles' raga rock, borrowing heavily from Indian music, it began exerting a reverse influence and had blended with Bollywood music by the early 1970s. This led to Bollywood producers exploring a middle-ground between disco and psychedelia in the early 1980s. Producers who experimented with disco-psychedelic fusion included Laxmikant–Pyarelal, on songs such as "Om Shanti Om" (Karz, 1980), and R. D. Burman, on songs such as "Pyaar Karne Waale" (Shaan, 1980), along with the use of synthesizers.

=== Ghazal ===
The ghazal tradition of Urdu poetry was the basis for early Bollywood music, ever since the first Indian talkie film, Alam Ara (1931). In turn, filmi ghazals had roots in earlier Urdu Parsi theatre of the mid-19th to early 20th centuries. The ghazal was the dominant style of Indian film music since the 1930s up until the 1960s. By the 1980s, however, ghazals had become marginalised in film music. Reasons for the decline include Urdu ghazal poetry being gradually phased out from the Indian education system, lyricists targeting urban middle-class audiences, and the influence of Western and Latin American music.

Music directors like Madan Mohan composed notable film-ghazals extensively for Muslim socials in the 1960s and the 1970s.

The filmi-ghazal style experienced a revival in the early 1990s, sparked by the success of Nadeem–Shravan's Aashiqui (1990). It had a big impact on Bollywood music at the time, ushering in ghazal-type romantic music that dominated the early 1990s, with soundtracks such as Dil, Saajan, Phool Aur Kaante and Deewana. A popular ghazal song from Aashiqui was "Dheere Dheere", a cover version of which was later recorded by Yo Yo Honey Singh and released by T-Series in 2015.

=== Qawwali ===
It represents a distinct subgenre of film music, although it is distinct from traditional qawwali, which is devotional Sufi music. One example of filmi qawwali is the song "Pardah Hai Pardah" sung by Mohammed Rafi, and composed by Laxmikant–Pyarelal, for the Indian film Amar Akbar Anthony (1977).

Within the subgenre of filmi qawwali, there exists a form of qawwali that is infused with modern and Western instruments, usually with techno beats, called techno-qawwali. An example of techno-qawwali is "Kajra Re", a filmi song composed by Shankar–Ehsaan–Loy. A newer variation of the techno-qawwali based on the more dance oriented tracks is known as the "club qawwali". More tracks of this nature are being recorded and released.

Nusrat Fateh Ali Khan and A. R. Rahman have composed filmi qawwalis in the style of traditional qawwali. Examples include "Tere Bin Nahin Jeena" (Kachche Dhaage), "Arziyan" (Delhi 6), "Khwaja Mere Khwaja" (Jodhaa Akbar), "Bharde Do Jholi Meri" (Bajrangi Bhaijaan) and "Kun Faya Kun" (Rockstar).

=== Rock ===
Indian musicians began fusing rock with traditional Indian music from the mid-1960s onwards in filmi songs produced for popular Bollywood films. Some of the more well known early rock songs (including styles such as funk rock, pop rock, psychedelic rock, raga rock, and soft rock) from Bollywood films include Kishore Kumar's "O Saathi Re" in Muqaddar Ka Sikandar (1978), Mohammed Rafi's "Jaan Pehechan Ho" in Gumnaam (1965), and Asha Bhosle songs such as "Dum Maro Dum" in Hare Rama Hare Krishna (1971), "Ae Naujawan Hai Sab" in Apradh (1972), and "Yeh Mera Dil Pyar Ka Diwana" in Don (1978).

== Unauthorised contrafacta ==
The Pakistani Qawwali musician Nusrat Fateh Ali Khan had a big impact on Bollywood music, inspiring numerous Indian musicians working in Bollywood, especially during the 1990s. However, there were many instances of Indian music directors plagiarising Khan's music to produce hit filmi songs. Several popular examples include Viju Shah's hit song "Tu Cheez Badi Hai Mast Mast" in Mohra (1994) being plagiarised from Khan's popular Qawwali song "Dam Mast Qalandar", "Mera Piya Ghar Aya" used in Yaarana (1995), and "Sanoo Ek Pal Chain Na Aaye" in Judaai (1997). Despite the significant number of hit Bollywood songs plagiarised from his music, Nusrat Fateh Ali Khan was reportedly tolerant towards the plagiarism. One of the Bollywood music directors who frequently plagiarised him, Anu Malik, claimed that he loved Khan's music and was actually showing admiration by using his tunes. However, Khan was reportedly aggrieved when Malik turned his spiritual "Allah Hoo, Allah Hoo" into "I Love You, I Love You" in Auzaar (1997). Khan said "he has taken my devotional song Allahu and converted it into I love you. He should at least respect my religious songs."

A number of Bollywood soundtracks also plagiarised Guinean singer Mory Kanté, particularly his 1987 album Akwaba Beach. For example, his song "Tama" inspired two Bollywood songs, Bappi Lahiri's "Tamma Tamma" in Thanedaar (1990) and "Jumma Chumma" in Laxmikant-Pyarelal's soundtrack for Hum (1991), the latter also featuring another song "Ek Doosre Se" which copied his song "Inch Allah". His song "Yé ké yé ké" was also used as background music in the 1990 Bollywood film Agneepath, inspired the Bollywood song "Tamma Tamma" in Thanedaar, and was also copied by Mani Sharma's song "Pellikala Vachesindhe" in the 1997 Telugu film, Preminchukundam Raa.

== Cultural impact ==
Indian cinema, with its characteristic film music, has not only spread all over Indian society, but also been at the forefront of spreading India's culture around the world. In Britain, Hindi film songs are heard in restaurants and on radio channels dedicated to Asian music. The British dramatist Sudha Bhuchar converted a Hindi film hit Hum Aapke Hain Koun..! into a hit musical "Fourteen Songs" which was well received by the British audience. Film-maker Baz Luhrmann acknowledged the influence of Hindi cinema on his production Moulin Rouge! by the inclusion of a number "Hindi Sad Diamonds" based on the filmi song "Chamma Chamma" which was composed by Anu Malik. In Greece the genre of indoprepi sprang from Hindi film music while in Indonesia dangdut singers like Ellya Khadam, Rhoma Irama and Mansyur S., have reworked Hindi songs for Indonesian audiences. In France, the band Les Rita Mitsouko used Bollywood influences in their music video for "Le petit train" and French singer Pascal of Bollywood popularised filmi music by covering songs such as "Zindagi Ek Safar Hai Suhana". In Nigeria bandiri music—a combination of Sufi lyrics and Bollywood-style music—has become popular among Hausa youth. Hindi film music has also been combined with local styles in the Caribbean to form "chutney music".

== Best-selling soundtrack albums ==
=== Top ten ===
Rank	Year	Soundtrack	Music director(s)	Sales	Ref
1	1990	Aashiqui	Nadeem–Shravan	20,000,000+ (didn't count after)	
2	1995	Dilwale Dulhania Le Jayenge	Jatin–Lalit	20,000,000	
2	1991	Saajan	Nadeem–Shravan	20,000,000	
3	1997	Dil Toh Pagal Hai	Uttam Singh	12,500,000	
4	1994	Hum Aapke Hain Kaun	Raamlaxman	12,000,000	
5	1996	Raja Hindustani	Nadeem–Shravan	11,000,000	
6	1989	Chandni	Shiv–Hari	10,000,000	
6	1989	Maine Pyar Kiya	Raamlaxman	10,000,000	
6	1993	Baazigar	Anu Malik	10,000,000	
6	1993	Khalnayak	Laxmikant–Pyarelal	10,000,000	
6	1995	Bewafa Sanam	Nikhil-Vinay	10,000,000	
6	1999	Kaho Naa... Pyaar Hai	Rajesh Roshan	10,000,000	

=== By decade ===
Decade	Soundtrack	Sales	Ref
1950s	Awaara (1951)	—N/a	
1960s	Sangam (1964)	—N/a	
1970s	Bobby (1973)	1,000,000	
1970s	Sholay (1975)	1,000,000	
1980s	Chandni (1989)	10,000,000	
1980s	Maine Pyar Kiya	10,000,000	
1990s	Aashiqui (1990)	20,000,000+ (Didn't count after)	
2000s	Mohabbatein (2000)	5,000,000	
2010s	Aashiqui 2 (2013)	760,000	

=== By year ===
Year	Soundtrack	Sales	Ref
1960	Mughal-e-Azam	—N/a	
1961	Junglee	—N/a	
1962	Bees Saal Baad	—N/a	
1963	Mere Mehboob	—N/a	
1964	Sangam	—N/a	
1965	Jab Jab Phool Khile	—N/a	
1966	Teesri Manzil	—N/a	
1967	Upkar	—N/a	
1969	Aradhana	—N/a	
1970	Johny Mera Naam	—N/a	
1971	Haathi Mere Saathi	—N/a	
1972	Pakeezah	—N/a	
1973	Bobby	1,000,000	
1974	Roti Kapada Aur Makaan	—N/a	
1975	Sholay	1,000,000	
1976	Laila Majnu	—N/a	
1977	Hum Kisise Kum Nahin	—N/a	
1978	Muqaddar Ka Sikander	—N/a	
1979	Sargam	—N/a	
1980	Qurbani	1,000,000	
1981	Ek Duje Ke Liye	—N/a	
1982	Disco Dancer	1,000,000	
1983	Hero	—N/a	
1984	Pyar Jhukta Nahin	—N/a	
1985	Ram Teri Ganga Maili	1,000,000	
1986	Bhagwaan Dada	1,000,000	
1987	Premaloka	3,800,000	
1988	Qayamat Se Qayamat Tak	8,000,000	
1988	Tezaab	8,000,000	
1989	Chandni	10,000,000	
1989	Maine Pyar Kiya	10,000,000	
1990	Aashiqui	20,000,000+ (didn't count after)	
1991	Saajan	20,000,000	
1992	Deewana	7,500,000	
1993	Baazigar	10,000,000	
1993	Khalnayak	10,000,000	
1994	Hum Aapke Hain Kaun	12,000,000	
1995	Dilwale Dulhania Le Jayenge	20,000,000	
1996	Raja Hindustani	11,000,000	
1997	Dil To Pagal Hai	12,500,000	
1998	Kuch Kuch Hota Hai	8,300,000	
1999	Kaho Naa... Pyaar Hai	10,000,000	
2000	Mohabbatein	5,000,000	
2001	Kabhi Khushi Kabhie Gham	3,500,000	
2002	Humraaz	2,200,000	
2003	Tere Naam	3,000,000	
2004	Veer-Zaara	3,000,000	
2005	Aashiq Banaya Aapne	2,000,000	
2006	Dhoom 2	2,000,000	
2007	Om Shanti Om	2,000,000	
2008	Ghajini	1,900,000	

== Album streams ==
The following were the most-streamed Bollywood music albums, as of 2020.

Year	Soundtrack	Composer(s)	Lyricist(s)	YouTube streams (billions)	Ref
2017	Tiger Zinda Hai	Vishal–Shekhar	Irshad Kamil	1.6	
2018	Satyameva Jayate	Nadeem–Shravan, Sajid–Wajid, Tanishk Bagchi, Arko, Rochak Kohli	Shabbir Ahmed, Ikka, Kumaar, Arko, Danish Sabri	1.5	
2018	Sonu Ke Titu Ki Sweety	Zack Knight, Yo Yo Honey Singh, Amaal Mallik, Guru Randhawa	Zack Knight, Kumaar, Yo Yo Honey Singh, Guru Randhawa	1.5	
2017	Badrinath Ki Dulhania	Amaal Mallik, Tanishk Bagchi, Bappi Lahiri, Akhil Sachdeva	Shabbir Ahmed, Kumaar, Akhil Sachdeva, Badshah	1.4	
2017	Ek Haseena Thi Ek Deewana Tha	Nadeem Saifi	Nadeem Saifi, Faaiz Anwar	1.3	
2018	Simmba	Tanishk Bagchi, Viju Shah, Nusrat Fateh Ali Khan, Kumaar	Shabbir Ahmed, Rashmi Virag, Nusrat Fateh Ali Khan	1.6	
2022	Brahmāstra: Part One – Shiva	Pritam	Amitabh Bhattacharya	1.2	

== See also ==
- Ankhiyon Ke Jharokhon Se
- Antakshari
- Babul (Hindi word)
- Bhajan
- Binaca Geetmala
- Filmfare Award for Best Lyricist
- Filmi qawwali
- Filmi-ghazal
- Filmi devotional songs
- Hindi dance music
- Hindi wedding songs
- Indian film music
- List of Indian playback singers
- Soundtrack album
