= Gumnaam =

1965 Indian Bollywood thriller film

- Film poster
- Directed by: Raja Nawathe
- Written by: Charandas Shokh; Dhruva Chatterjee
- Based on: And Then There Were None by Agatha Christie
- Produced by: N. N. Sippy
- Starring: Manoj Kumar; Nanda; Mehmood; Pran; Helen; Madan Puri; Tarun Bose; Dhumal; Manmohan
- Cinematography: K. H. Kapadia
- Edited by: D. N. Pai
- Music by: Shankar–Jaikishan
- Production company: Prithvi Pictures
- Release date: 24 December 1965
- Running time: 145 minutes
- Country: India
- Language: Hindi
- Box office: est. ₹2.6 crore ($5.46 million)

Gumnaam (translation: Anonymous) is a 1965 Indian Hindi-language mystery film directed by Raja Nawathe and produced by N. N. Sippy. The film was released in India on 24 December 1965 and stars an ensemble cast of Manoj Kumar, Nanda, Mehmood, Pran, Helen, Madan Puri, Tarun Bose, Dhumal and Manmohan. The film is a loosely inspired adaptation of Agatha Christie's 1939 mystery novel And Then There Were None and was remade in Tamil as Naalai Unathu Naal (1984). In the film, eight people (six men and two women) find themselves stranded on a remote island after winning a contest. As soon as they settle down in an eerie mansion with a strange butler, the guests begin to get murdered one after the other.

== Plot ==
On a dark night, wealthy Seth Sohanlal, stepping drunkenly out of a hotel, is run down by a speeding car and dies on the spot. A room overlooking the hotel is occupied by Khanna (Hiralal), Seth Sohanlal's murderer, who gives a bundle of banknotes to the unseen driver of the car arriving shortly after. Khanna then makes a series of telephone calls to unseen people: to a doctor, whom he tells that a medical certificate needs to be created; to a mysterious young girl, whom he tells that the will needs to be sent to the "right place"; and to a lawyer, whom he tells that the will will reach him the next morning and after that it is his job. Later, Khanna calls Seth Sohanlal's niece, Asha (Nanda), and breaks the news of her uncle's death. As Asha screams in anguish, she hears some gunshots at the other end of the line as an unseen intruder in a long coat and hat has entered Khanna's room and shot him to death. A few days later, it is announced at a nightclub that the seven winners (five men and two girls) of a "lucky draw" have won a free fortnight-long trip to an unspecified destination abroad and will be going in a chartered airplane. These fortunate people are Barrister Rakesh (Pran), Dharamdas (Dhumal), Kishan (Manmohan), Kitty Kelly (Helen), Dr. Acharya (Madan Puri), Madhusudan Sharma (Tarun Bose), and finally, Asha, who now seems more composed.

Soon, these seven winners are in their chartered airplane, off of their vacation abroad, when the pilot announces to them and the only flight attendant who is on board, Anand (Manoj Kumar), that the airplane is forced to make an emergency landing at an anonymous remote island due to some technical problems. However, as soon as Anand and the seven passengers alight from the airplane, the pilot shockingly dumps all their baggage out and the airplane takes off without them, leaving them all stranded on the island. At the same time, a mysterious girl begins singing an eerie song on the island without the girl ever being visible. The eight people follow the girl's voice and finally come across at a vast and spooky mansion, which seems to be unoccupied except for a comical lungi-clad butler (Mehmood), who is in charge of the mansion and has been shockingly expecting the arrival of the castaways. The butler also knows each of these people by name and has been provided with a letter listing all of these people except Anand. Moreover, everyone discovers that the butler has a diary which, besides containing an account of daily expense, also contains a message addressed to the entire group, accusing each of these people of having conspired to kill Seth Sohanlal and passing a death sentence on them. That night, Anand, who himself has mysteriously brought with him a gun, discovers that Dr. Acharya has brought a bottle of poison and Dharamdas a fearsome-looking dagger. While Rakesh and Kitty fall in love and Anand begins flirting with Asha, the butler's suspicious actions indicate the presence of an unknown person in the mansion.

The next day passes uneventfully, but at night, Anand and Asha are shocked to find Kishan stabbed to death with a half-smoked cigar and a letter addressed to the group next to Kishan's dead body. The letter states that Kishan was the driver of the car that ran down Seth Sohanlal, and that is why he has now been killed. The group deduces that Dharamdas killed Kishan, but he pleads innocence and Anand and Asha also later find him strangled to death. Rakesh accuses Dr. Acharya of actually having poisoned Dharamdas and it becomes clear that everyone was connected to Seth Sohanlal: Kitty was Seth Sohanlal's private secretary who sent his will to Rakesh on Khanna's instructions; while Rakesh wrote Seth Sohanlal's will on Khanna's orders, though neither was aware about the other. The next day, Anand notices Rakesh hiding an axe before Dr. Acharya appears informing that Sharma has been murdered with an axe. The murderer has left another letter addressed to the group next to Sharma's dead body, stating that Sharma has been killed because he was Khanna's co-conspirator in Seth Sohanlal's murder. Now only three men - Anand, Rakesh and Dr. Acharya - and two girls - Asha and Kitty - are left alive and terrified on the island along with the butler.

That night, Dr. Acharya catches the butler acting suspiciously and learns his secret before a scuffle ensues between them. In the presence of Asha and Kitty, a stabbed Dr. Acharya enters the dining room, utters Anand's name and breathes his last. Anand and Rakesh accuse each other of Dr. Acharya's murder, while Asha begins questioning her faith in Anand. The next day, Kitty goes for a walk by herself and is strangled to death by a rope. Rakesh and Asha, searching for Kitty, are shocked to find her dead body and Anand's hat next to it. Rakesh witnesses Anand escaping from the crime scene and begins pursuing him, but loses his trail. In a fit of rage and grief, Rakesh returns to the mansion and attempts to rape Asha in the middle of the night. Asha escapes from Rakesh, but runs into him again as Rakesh collapses dead with two daggers in his back. All the lights in the mansion go out, which indicates that the killer has arrived and that Asha is next. The killer approaches Asha and she falls unconscious in fear, before he carries her to a secret room and helps her regain consciousness. At this point, Asha is shocked to learn that the killer is none other than Sharma, who reveals that he is alive and that he had only employed the butler to make the necessary arrangements on the island. Posing as one of the castaways, he killed Kishan and Dharamdas and then convinced Dr. Acharya to falsely declare him dead, on the pretext that it would help him secretly track down the killer, and later killed Dr. Acharya as well along with Kitty and Rakesh.

Just then, Anand appears at the scene and reveals that he is actually an undercover police inspector on the mission to capture Sharma, an escaped convict whose real name is Madanlal. Madanlal confesses to Anand and Asha that both Khanna and Seth Sohanlal were his partners in smuggling, but he was betrayed by them after being arrested by the police. Khanna and Seth Sohanlal also raped Madanlal's sister, which led her to commit suicide, and murdered Madanlal's brother as well after he informed Madanlal about their crime in prison. Khanna also had Seth Sohanlal killed to usurp the share of his money, but Madanlal escaped from prison and murdered Khanna. He then ensured that his targets "won" the lucky draw held at the nightclub and took the trip in order to murder Khanna's remaining five assistants too. Madanlal then ties up both Anand and Asha and plays a game of Russian Roulette with them. However, the butler secretly arrives and unties Anand, who attacks Madanlal as he is about to shoot Asha with the only bullet. In the ensuing scuffle, Madanlal escapes from the mansion and runs towards the shore, but an airplane full of police (acting upon Anand's information) lands on the island and Madanlal is arrested for his crimes. At the same time, the "ghost" girl singing the ominous song turns out to be the butler's mentally ill sister (Naina). The film ends with Anand, Asha, the butler and his sister leaving the ill-fated island on the airplane.

== Cast ==
- Manoj Kumar as Inspector Anand
- Nanda as Asha
- Pran as Barrister Rakesh
- Helen as Kitty Kelly
- Madan Puri as Dr. Acharya
- Mehmood as the butler Mahesh Rane
- Tarun Bose as Madhusudan Sharma (fake) / Madanlal
- Dhumal as Dharamdas
- Manmohan as Kishan
- Laxmi Chhaya and Herman Benjamin as the masked dancer and masked singer respectively in "Jaan Pehechan Ho" song
- Hiralal as Khanna (Seth Sohanlal's murderer)
- Naina as the butler's insane sister

== Soundtrack ==
The music in this movie was composed by Shankar-Jaikishan and lyrics were written by Shailendra and Hasrat Jaipuri.

Song	Singer(s)
"Jaan Pehechan Ho"	Mohammed Rafi
"Gumnaam Hai Koi"	Lata Mangeshkar
"Ek Ladki Hai Jisne Jeena Mushkil Kar Diya"	Mohammed Rafi
"Jaane Chaman Shola Badan"	Mohammed Rafi and Sharda
"Peeke Hum Tum Jo"	Asha Bhosle and Usha Mangeshkar
"Gham Chhodke Manaao Rang"	Lata Mangeshkar
"Aayega Kaun Yahaan"	Sharda
"Hum Kaale Hain To"	Mohammed Rafi

== Reception ==
=== Box office ===
It was the 8th highest-grossing film in India in 1965, grossing ₹2.6 crore. This was equivalent to $5.46 million in 1965. (Note: 4.7619 Indian rupees per US dollar in 1965)

== Awards and nominations ==
13th Filmfare Awards:

Won

- Best Art Direction (Color) – S. S. Samel

Nominated

- Best Supporting Actor – Mehmood
- Best Supporting Actress – Helen
