= Ramayan (1954 film) =

- Directed by: Vijay Bhatt
- Story by: Based on Valmiki's Ramayana
- Based on: Ramayana by Valmiki
- Produced by: Vijay Bhatt
- Starring: Prem Adib; Shobhna Samarth; Shahu Modak; Durga Khote
- Music by: Shankarrao Vyas; Hariprasanna Das
- Release date: 1954
- Running time: 132 min
- Country: India
- Language: Hindi

Ramayan is a 1954 Hindi religious film based on Valmiki's Ramayana, produced and directed by Vijay Bhatt for Prakash Pictures. The music directors were Shankar Rao Vyas and Hariprasanna Das and the lyrics were written by Ramesh Gupta, Pandit Indra, Neelkanth Tiwari, Baalam Pardesi. The film starred Prem Adib and Shobhana Samarth once again as Rama and Sita. The two actors had earlier acted in a trilogy of Bhatt's films based on the Ramayana, Bharat Milap (1942), Ram Rajya (1943) and Rambaan (1946). All three had been extremely successful, with the audience accepting them in the traditional roles. The other costars included Shahu Modak, Durga Khote, and Umakant.

The story revolved around the latter part of the epic Ramayana, focussing on Rama and Sita's twin sons Luv and Kusha.

== Cast ==
- Shobhana Samarth
- Prem Adib
- Shahu Modak
- Durga Khote
- Trilok Kapoor
- Umakant

== Soundtrack ==
The music composers were Shankar Rao Vyas and Hariprasanna Das with Manna Dey singing songs like "Seete Seete Seete Rom Rom Ram Ka", "Tyagmayi Tu Gayi Teri Amar Bhavna" and "Ajab Vidhi Ka Lekh", which was composed by Hariprassana Das. The lyricists were Pandit Indra, Ramesh Gupta, Baalam Pardesi and Neelkanth Tiwari with songs sung by Manna Dey, Phulaji Bua, G. M. Durrani, Amirbai Karnataki, Wamanrao Sadolikar, Shahu Modak, Saraswati Rane, Yashwant, Madhusudan and Baby Tara.

=== Songlist ===
#	Title	Singer	Lyricist
1	"Jhananan Jhananan Baaj Rahi Hai"	Phulaji Bua	Baalam Pardesi
2	"Ram Chale Ram Chale Ban Chale Ram Raghuveer"	G. M. Durrani	Pandit Indra
3	"Aaye Raghuveer Aaye Ganga Ke Teer"	Amirbai Karnataki, Wamanrao Sadolikar	Pandit Indra
4	"Pehle Paanv Pakharun Prabhu"	Amirbai Karnataki, Wamanrao Sadolikar	Pandit Indra
5	"Bata Do Ram Gaye Kis Ore"	Shahu Modak	Balam Pardesi
6	"Seete Seete Rom Rom Karta Pukar"	Manna Dey	Neelkanth Tiwari
7	"Beena Madhur Madhur Kuch Bol"	Saraswati Rane	Ramesh Gupta
8	"Ajab Vidhi Ka Lekh Kisi Se Padha Nahin Jaye"	Manna Dey	Ramesh Gupta
9	"Jhoole Mein Jhool Tu Jhoole Mein Jhool"	Baby Tara	Ramesh Gupta
10	"Bharat Ki Ek Sannari Ki Hum Katha"	Yashwant, Madhusudan	Ramesh Gupta
11	"Tyagmayi Tu Gayi Teri Amar Bhavna"	Manna Dey	Ramesh Gupta
12	"Paapi Ko Toh Ganga Taare Bhakton Ko Narayan"		
