= Mukherjee-Samarth family =

Bengali-Marathi family within the Hindi film industry

The Mukherjee-Samarth family is a Bengali-Marathi Hindu family that has been involved in the Hindi film industry since the 1930s, Shobhana Samarth having first acted in a film in 1935. The Mukherjee family was connected to the Samarth family by Tanuja's marriage to Shomu Mukherjee in 1973.

== Mukherjees ==
The Mukherjee side of the family is a Bengali Hindu Kulin Brahmin family which was originally headed by Sashadhar Mukherjee's father Haripada Mukherjee, a lawyer hailing from Mymensingh, Bangladesh who established a successful practice in the city of Jhansi. Sashadhar, who went on to become one of the pioneers of Indian cinema and the founder of Filmalaya studios, was Haripada's second son. Sashadhar would later go on to marry Ashok Kumar's sister Satirani Ganguly.

Their five sons, Rono Mukherjee, Joy Mukherjee, Deb Mukherjee, Shomu Mukherjee and Shubir Mukherjee followed him into the industry. Rono was the director and composer of a single movie. He is the father of actors Sharbani Mukherjee and Samrat Mukherjee. Joy and Deb were both actors. Deb's son is director Ayan Mukerji and daughter Sunita is married to director Ashutosh Gowariker. Shomu became a director and producer, and is the father of actresses Kajol and Tanishaa. Shubir is also a producer.

Sashadhar's elder brother was Ravindramohan Mukherjee, a renowned magistrate in Jhansi. He had 3 sons and 5 daughters. His eldest son Lalit Kishore Mukherjee (d. October 1991) was married to Monica Mukherjee (d. July 27, 2009) and had 5 children (3 sons and 2 daughters) - Late Surjoe Mukerji ( 1948 - 2024) , Gauri Chakravarty, Late Bina Chatterjee ( 1953 - 2025) , Shakti Mukerji and Satyajit Mukerji. Ravindramohan's second son, Shyam Mukherjee remained a bachelor till his death in 2015.

Ravindramohan's youngest son, Ram Mukherjee, was a film director and one of the founders of Filmalaya Studios. He died on 22 October 2017. He had two children with his wife Krishna Mukerji, the actress Rani Mukerji, and Raja Mukerji, who is a producer.

Sashadhar's younger brother, Prabodh Mukherjee, was a film producer. He died on 3 May 2008, leaving behind his wife Parul Rani Mukherjee, and their sons Tapan and Basudeb. Both sons work in the film distribution business.

Sashadhar's other younger brother, Subodh Mukherjee, was a director. He died on 21 May 2005. He is survived by his wife Kamala, sons Subhash and Sanjay and daughter Gitanjali. None of Subodh's children, unlike their cousins, are involved in show business.

Filmalaya Studios is currently owned and managed by the surviving Mukerji brothers.

== Samarths ==
The Samarth family is a Marathi family. Their legacy in films began with Rattan Bai, who acted primarily in Hindi cinema. Her daughter Shobhna Samarth (1916–2000), was an actress and appeared in the film Ram Rajya (1943 ) as Sita. Later she acted in supporting role in films like Love in Simla (1960), which also featured Joy Mukherjee. Shobhna's husband was the film director Kumarsen Samarth. Her cousin, Nalini Jaywant, was also an actress.

Shobhna's daughters are Chatura, Tanuja and Nutan. Tanuja and Nutan became actresses. Tanuja was a moderate success in Hindi films, but garnered huge recognition in the Bengali film industry. Nutan (1936–1991) became a huge star in the Hindi film industry. She is tied for the record for five Filmfare Best Actress awards won with her niece Kajol.

Tanuja and Nutan's children have also entered the film industry; they are the fourth generation of Samarths to do so. Nutan's son Mohnish Bahl is an actor and his daughter Pranutan Bahl is an actress; Tanuja and Shomu's daughters Kajol and Tanishaa are also actresses.

== Notable current members ==
=== Kajol Mukherjee ===
The daughter of actress Tanuja Samarth and filmmaker Shomu Mukherjee, Kajol is one of the most popular actresses in Hindi cinema. She has won six Filmfare awards among them five for Best Actress and one for Best Villain. She was the first woman to win the Filmfare best villain award. She has numerous blockbusters and hits to her name such as Baazigar (1993), Dilwale Dulhania Le Jayenge (1995), Gupt: The Hidden Truth (1997), Ishq (1997), Pyaar To Hona Hi Tha (1998), Kuch Kuch Hota Hai (1998), Kabhi Khushi Kabhi Gham (2001) and Fanaa (2006). Her films with Shah Rukh Khan have been huge hits.

Kajol is married to actor Ajay Devgn; the couple has a daughter, Nysa, and a son, Yug. For a few years, she focused on her marriage and motherhood, sidelining films. Her comeback film Fanaa (2006) with Aamir Khan was hugely successful as was her 2010 release My Name is Khan. She has also acted in her husband's directorial debut U Me Aur Hum (2008). After taking another break, she came back with the hit film Dilwale (2015). Her recent OTT ventures like Tribhanga (2021), Do Patti (2024), and The Trial series (2023-present) have also garnered huge appreciation.

Her younger sister Tanishaa, aunt Nutan, grandmother Shobhna, great-grandmother Rattan Bai and cousins Sharbani, Mohnish and Rani are also actors in Hindi cinema, while another cousin, Ayan, is a director, and grandfather, Kumarsen, was a poet.

=== Ajay Devgan ===
Ajay Devgan (born: Vishal Veeru Devgan on 2 April 1969) is Kajol's husband, and also an Indian actor, director, and producer, who has established himself as one of the leading actors of Hindi cinema. Devgan has won numerous awards in his career, including two National Film Awards. He is the son of the late director and action choreographer Veeru Devgan.

=== Rani Mukerji ===
Rani Mukerji is also a known actress in Hindi cinema. She is the daughter of filmmaker Ram Mukherjee and playback singer Krishna Mukherjee. Her brother is producer Raja Mukherjee. She worked with Kajol in the 1998 hit Kuch Kuch Hota Hai and had a cameo in the 2001 blockbuster Kabhi Khushi Kabhie Gham. She has several hit films to her credit such as Ghulam (1998), Saathiya (2002), Chalte Chalte (2003), Hum Tum (2004), Veer-Zaara (2004), Bunty Aur Babli (2005), and Kabhi Alvida Naa Kehna. Rani is married to film director, producer, screenwriter and distributor Aditya Chopra, who has produced most of her films and they have been largely successful. Her comeback films like Mardaani (2014), Hichki (2018) and Mardaani 2 (2019) were also produced by him and were a success.

=== Aditya Chopra ===
Aditya Chopra is an Indian film director and producer, and the CEO of the Yash Raj Films. He is the son of director and producer Yash Chopra and comes from the Chopra-Johar family. He married Rani Mukerji in 2014. He is the director of Dilwale Dulhaniya Le Jayenge, Mohabbatein and Rab Ne Bana Di Jodi for which he won numerous awards including Filmfare Awards and National Awards. Chopra's cousins Karan Johar and Vidhu Vinod Chopra are also notable members of his family.

=== Mohnish Bahl ===
Mohnish Bahl is an Indian actor working in the Indian film industry and on Indian television. He is a member of the Mukherjee-Samarth family. His parents were actress Nutan and Rajnish Bahl, a lieutenant commander in the Indian Navy. He is the grandson of actress Shobhna and poet Kumarsen, great-grandson of actress Rattan Bai, nephew of actress Tanuja and cousin of actresses Kajol and Tanishaa. A frequent collaborator of Sooraj Barjatya, Bahl has appeared in Barjatya's blockbusters Maine Pyar Kiya (1989), Hum Aapke Hain Koun..! (1994), Hum Saath-Saath Hain (1999), and Vivah (2006).

=== Ayan Mukerji ===
Ayan Mukerji (Bengali: অয়ন মুখার্জি), born in Kolkata, West Bengal, is an Indian film director. He is the son of actor Deb Mukherjee and made his directorial debut with Karan Johar produced Wake Up Sid (2009), and won the Filmfare Award for Best Debut Director. He directed his next film, the highly successful Yeh Jawaani Hai Deewani in 2013. His most ambitious film Brahmāstra: Part One - Shiva released on 9 September 2022.

=== Ashutosh Gowariker ===
Ashutosh Gowariker is an Indian film director, actor, writer and producer, known for films such as Lagaan (2001), Swades (2004) and Jodhaa Akbar (2008) among others. He is married to Sunita, Deb Mukherjee's daughter from his first marriage.

=== Pranutan Bahl ===
Pranutan Bahl is an Indian actress and daughter of actors Mohnish Bahl and Ekta Sohini. She is known for films including Notebook (2019) and Helmet (2021).
