= Rambaan =

1948 Indian film

- Directed by: Vijay Bhatt
- Written by: Mohanlal Dave; Pandit Girish (dialogues)
- Produced by: Vijay Bhatt
- Starring: Prem Adib; Shobhana Samarth
- Cinematography: G. N. Shirodkar
- Music by: Shankar Rao Vyas
- Production company: Prakash Pictures
- Release date: 2 December 1948
- Running time: 155 minutes
- Country: India
- Language: Hindi

Rambaan (transl. Rama's arrow) is a 1948 Indian Hindi-language mythological drama film directed and produced by Vijay Bhatt and written by Mohanlal Dave, with dialogue by Pandit Girish. The film starred Prem Adib as Rama and Shobhana Samarth as Sita, with Chandra Mohan, Umakant, Amirbai Karnataki and Raj Adib in other principal characters. The film's music was composed by Shankar Rao Vyas.

Bhatt has produced several films based on themes from the epic Ramayana. Rambaan is the third film in Bhatt's trilogy of films based on Ramayana with Adib as Rama and Samarth as Sita, after Bharat Milap (1942) and Ram Rajya (1943). Samarth and Adib attained popularity with these films that they were featured as Rama and Sita on calendars.

== Plot ==
Rama with his wife Sita and brother Lakshman are banished for fourteen years to the forest. Ravana the king of Lanka wants to avenge his sister Surpanakha's humiliation by Lakshman. His plan is to abduct Sita by sending Maricha as a golden-spotted deer. Sita sees the deer and wants Rama to go after it as she wants its skin to make a blouse for Lakshman's wife Urmila. A cry is heard and thinking it is Rama shouting in pain, Sita sends Lakshman in search. Lakshman, who is loath to go as he has promised Rama to take care of Sita, finally leaves after drawing a line, the Lakshmana rekha, round the cottage to keep Sita safe. Ravan kidnaps Sita by making her step on his sandal that he places inside the Lakshman-rekha. This incident leads to Rama and Lakshman's meeting with Sugriva and Hanuman where they help in the war against Ravan to get Sita back.

== Cast ==
- Prem Adib as Rama
- Shobhana Samarth as Sita
- Chandra Mohan as Ravana
- Umakant
- Bhujbal
- Ram Singh
- Raj Adib
- Leela Mishra
- Amirbai Karnataki
- Jankidas

== Soundtrack ==
The film had music composed by Shankar Rao Vyas with the lyrics written by Pandit Indra, Neelkanth Tiwari and Moli. The singers included Rajkumari, Lalita Devulkar, Manna Dey, Saraswati Rane, Phulaji Bua, R. P. Sharma, Shankar Dasgupta and Amirbai Karnataki.

=== Song list ===
#	Title	Singer	Lyricist
1	"Banvasi More Ram"	Amirbai Karnataki	Pandit Indra
2	"Sakhi Ri Mohe Panchvati Man Bhayi"	Rajkumari, Lalita Devulkar	Pandit Indra
3	"Seete Seete Ram Karta Pukar"	Manna Dey	Neelkanth Tiwari
4	"Bhagwan Aao Aao O Bhilani Ke Bhagwan"	Amirbai Karnataki	Pandit Indra
5	"Bina Ram Janki Sooni"	Saraswati Rane	Pandit Indra
6	"Japo Ram Siya Ram"	Manna Dey, Phulaji Bua, R.P. Sharma	Neelkanth Tiwari
7	"Uth Lakhan Lal Priye Bhai"	Shankar Dasgupta	Moti
8	"Tom Tananana Dir Na"	Rajkumari, Lalita Devulkar	Neelkanth Tiwari

== Critical reception ==
Ram Baan came in for harsh criticism from Baburao Patel, editor of Filmindia. In his February 1949 issue, he first criticises the director for casting Prem Adib with his "sagging and emaciated muscles" as Rama, and an eight-month pregnant (at the time) Shobhana Samarth as Sita. He then brings out several salient features and scenes in the film that are "sacriligious distortions" as compared to Valmiki's Ramayana. He points out a confused mix of characters and locations. He further mentions that Bhatt's portrayal of Ravana as a drunk with rolling eyes shouting "Main Kaun...? Ravan!" (Who am I...? Ravan!) in every second scene is a contempt which "drags the character down".
