= E Ki Holo =

1970 song by Kishore Kumar

- Side B of 10-inch vinyl

Single by Kishore Kumar

from the album Rajkumari
- Language: Bengali
- English title: What happened? Why did this happen?
- A-side: "Tobu Bole Keno Sahasai"
- Released: 1970
- Genre: Love song
- Length: 3:22
- Label: Saregama
- Songwriters: Rahul Dev Burman (music); Gauriprasanna Mazumder (lyrics)
- Producer: Rahul Dev Burman

Music video
- "E Ki Holo" on YouTube

"E Ki Holo" (Note: Also known by its first two lines "E Ki Holo, Keno Holo".) is a Bengali song by Kishore Kumar from the 1970 Bengali film Rajkumari directed by Salil Sen. It was written by lyricist Gauriprasanna Mazumder and composed by music director R. D. Burman. It is described as a love-themed song based on a sad mood. It is picturized on actors Uttam Kumar and Tanuja in the film.

A Hindi remake of it was titled "Yeh Kya Hua" and featured in the 1972 film Amar Prem.

Businessman Harsh Goenka posted a video on Twitter in 2023 that showed a mashup of the two songs. "E Ki Holo" and the Hindi version have been covered by artists.

== Later uses and performances ==
=== Remake ===
"E Ki Holo" was remade in Hindi as the song "Yeh Kya Hua", featured in the 1972 film Amar Prem, directed by Shakti Samanta. It was written by lyricist Anand Bakshi. R. D. Burman (Rahul Dev Burman) adapted the music and singing style from the Bengali song into the Hindi song, for which Bakshi wrote lyrics to resemble the initial style.

=== Post by Harsh Goenka ===
Industrialist Harsh Goenka shared a post on Twitter (X) on February 12, 2023, with a video that showed a mashup of both the Bengali "E Ki Holo" and the Hindi "Yeh Kya Hua" with the caption "Some tunes are so magical, be it in whatever language - in this case in Hindi/Bengali." The video opens with the Hindi version, switching to the Bengali version and again switching to the Hindi song. "E Ki Holo" is picturized on Uttam Kumar and Tanuja, while "Yeh Kya Hua" is picturized on Rajesh Khanna and Sharmila Tagore.

=== Performances by singers ===
In October 2023, singer Atif Aslam sang "Yeh Kya Hua" while on a concert tour in North America. It was received well by the audience on the day, as reported by India Today. On December 28, 2024, singer Amit Kumar, son of Kishore Kumar sang a cover version of "E Ki Holo" in the Outram Club located in Mumbai. He expressed his gratitude and praises towards R. D. Burman, who he remarked told him to embrace his own style and not get overshadowed by Kishore Kumar's legacy. He sang it as a tribute, which according to t2ONLINE, "The crowd erupted in joy when Kumar sang the iconic E ki holo, a moment that truly touched everyone's hearts."
