= Annavin Aasai =

1966 film by Dada Mirasi

- Theatrical release poster
- Directed by: Dada Mirasi
- Screenplay by: S. I. Peruman
- Based on: Chand Aur Suraj by Dulal Guha
- Produced by: Balaji
- Starring: Gemini Ganesan; Savitri; Balaji; Vijaya
- Cinematography: Kamal Ghosh
- Edited by: B. Kandasamy
- Music by: K. V. Mahadevan
- Production company: Sujatha Cine Arts
- Distributed by: Gemini Studios
- Release date: 4 March 1966
- Country: India
- Language: Tamil

Annavin Aasai (transl. The elder brother's wish) is a 1966 Indian Tamil-language crime drama film directed by Dada Mirasi and produced by Balaji. A remake of the Hindi film Chand Aur Suraj (1965), it stars Gemini Ganesan, Savitri, Balaji and Vijaya. In the film, after a man's faked death, the lives of his family members change drastically when they receive money from an insurance company he cheated.

Annavin Aasai is the first film produced by Balaji's Sujatha Cine Arts. Its screenplay was written by S. I. Peruman, the cinematography was handled by Kamal Ghosh, and the editing by B. Kandasamy. The film was released on 4 March 1966 and was a modest commercial success.

== Plot ==
Ramanathan and Seetha, a married couple, face difficulties after the former loses his job. Ramanathan wants to help his younger brother Ravi to pursue MBBS, and to fund his education, he takes an insurance policy for ₹100,000 (equivalent to ₹6.0 million or US$63,000 in 2023). Ramanathan then fakes his death by using a mutilated man's corpse near a railway line, and is legally declared dead. Seetha, who is traumatised by her husband's "death", tells Ravi to pursue his education using the insurance money she receives.

Ravi eventually becomes disinterested in his education. Using the insurance money, he takes to betting on horse racing and becomes rich. He falls in love with Vijaya, the daughter of a wealthy businessman. Mohan, a family friend and lawyer, discovers that Ramanathan is still alive and shares this information with Seetha, but she chooses to keep it a secret. Ravi misunderstands Mohan's night-time visits; assuming that Seetha is having an affair with Mohan, he begins to taunt her.

Seetha later arranges Ravi's marriage with Vijaya, whose father commits suicide after having been cheated by an insurance fraud. Ravi, still unaware that Ramanathan is alive, believes he is responsible for his brother's "death", surrenders to the police and is taken to court before a judge. During Ravi's trial, Mohan asserts that Ramanathan is not dead and Ravi pleaded guilty to murdering someone who is still alive. Soon after, Ramanathan appears and tells the court the truth. Ravi is exonerated, while Ramanathan receives three years' imprisonment for committing insurance fraud.

== Cast ==
Male cast

- Gemini Ganesan as Ramanathan
- Balaji as Ravi
- Nagesh
- A. Karunanidhi
- Manohar as Mohan
- Sarangapani as Vijaya's father
- Ashok Kumar as the judge

Female cast

- Savitri as Seetha
- Vijaya as Vijaya
- Manorama
- Baby Shakila as Seetha's daughter
- Devi Chandrika
- Madhumati

== Production ==
Annavin Aasai was a remake of the Dulal Guha-directed Hindi film Chand Aur Suraj (1965), and was the first production of K. Balaji's company Sujatha Cine Arts. Dada Mirasi directed the film while the screenplay was written by S. I. Peruman. Besides producing the film, Balaji also acted as Ravi, the younger brother of Gemini Ganesan's character Ramanathan. Ashok Kumar, the lead actor of the original, made a cameo appearance as the judge presiding over Ravi's trial, making his first appearance in a Tamil film. Cinematography was handled by Kamal Ghosh, editing by B. Kandasamy, and the final length of the film was 4,761 metres (15,620 ft).

== Soundtrack ==
The soundtrack was composed by K. V. Mahadevan, with lyrics by Kannadasan and Vaali.

Track listing
No.	Title	Lyrics	Singer(s)	Length
1.	"Kovililae Veedu Katti"	Kannadasan	T. M. Soundararajan, A. L. Raghavan, P. Susheela
2.	"Pooppol Malara Mottu Vaiththan"	Vaali	P. Susheela
3.	"Paateluthattum Paruvam"	Vaali	P. B. Sreenivas, P. Susheela
4.	"Inbamenbathu"	Kannadasan	T. M. Soundararajan, P. Susheela
5.	"Thunbam Enpathu Enna"	Kannadasan	P. Susheela

== Release and reception ==
Annavin Aasai was released on 4 March 1966, and distributed by Gemini Studios. The following week, on 12 March, The Indian Express said, "Dynamic performance by all the artistes – [Savitri] particularly – and a couple of good tunes by K. V. Mahadevan attempt to revive our sagging hopes. But they are only partly fulfilled." T. M. Ramachandran of Sport and Pastime said the "treatment by director Dada Mirasi is so pedestrian that the film fails to sustain interest completely." He praised the performances of Ganesan, Savitri, Balaji and Vijaya, but criticised the comedy subplot featuring Nagesh. Kalki said the film could be watched for Balaji, Ganesan, Savitri and Vijaya. According to historian Randor Guy, it was not a major success but "good enough to boost the morale of [Balaji] to stick to the new role" of a producer.

== Bibliography ==
- சிவரஞ்சன் (2001). சுராவின் சுவையான சினிமா துணுக்குகள் [Sura's delicious cinematic snippets] (in Tamil). Sura Books. ISBN 817478246X.
