= Vijay Arora =

Indian actor (1944–2007)

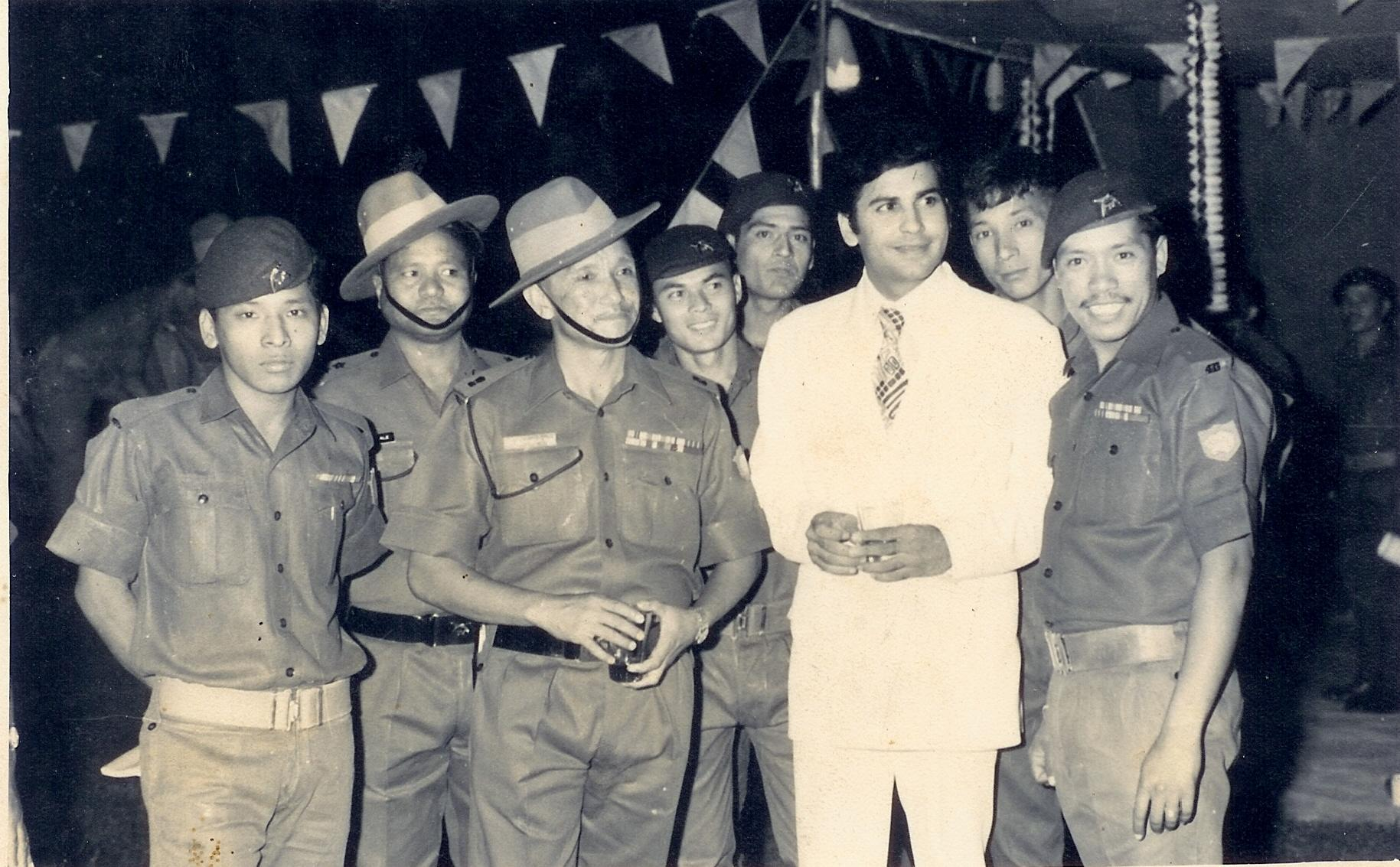
- Arora at the Indo-China Border.
- Born: 27 December 1944; Amritsar, Punjab, British India
- Died: 2 February 2007 (aged 62); Mumbai, Maharashtra, India
- Occupation: Actor
- Spouse: Dilber Debara
- Children: Farhad Vijay Arora

Vijay Arora (27 December 1944 – 2 February 2007) was an Indian actor in Hindi films and television serials who was known for Yaadon Ki Baaraat and as Indrajit / Meghnada in the television serial Ramayan.

== Career ==
Arora won a gold medal when he graduated from the Film and Television Institute of India in 1971. He made his debut with another newcomer Reena Roy in Zaroorat (1972). He appeared with Asha Parekh in Rakhi Aur Hathkadi (1972). He shot to stardom with the guitar-strumming Zeenat Aman (featuring the romantic song, "Chura Liya Hai") in Dharmendra starrer Yaadon Ki Baaraat (1973). He played Jaya Bhaduri’s husband in Phagun (1973). He starred with Shabana Azmi in Kadambari (1976); with Tanuja in Insaaf (1973); with Parveen Babi in 36 Ghante (1974); and with Moushumi Chatterjee in Natak (1975). Filmmaker Hrishikesh Mukherjee gave him a starring role in the film Sabse Bada Sukh (1972). Other films include Roti (1974), the lead role in Jeevan Jyoti (1976), opposite Bindiya Goswami, which was a surprise hit of the year, Sargam (1979), Bade Dil Wala (1983), Jaan Tere Naam (1992) and Indian Babu (2003), where his characters were peripheral to the story line.

In the late 80s, he again found success on the small screen with his role as Meghnad Indrajit in the serial Ramayan, directed by Ramanand Sagar. He also appeared in the series Bharat Ek Khoj, directed by Shyam Benegal as Prince Salim/Emperor Jahangir.

In 2001, he was seen in two serials, Lakeerein and Talaash, and Ketan Mehta's Pradhan Mantri. He acted in Jaana Na Dil Se Door, directed by Vijay Anand. Arora appeared in Gujarati cinema in films like Raja Harish Chandra, with Madhuri Dixit. He had acted in several Hindi and Gujarati plays. He did over 110 films and over 500 broadcast television serial episodes.

== Personal life ==
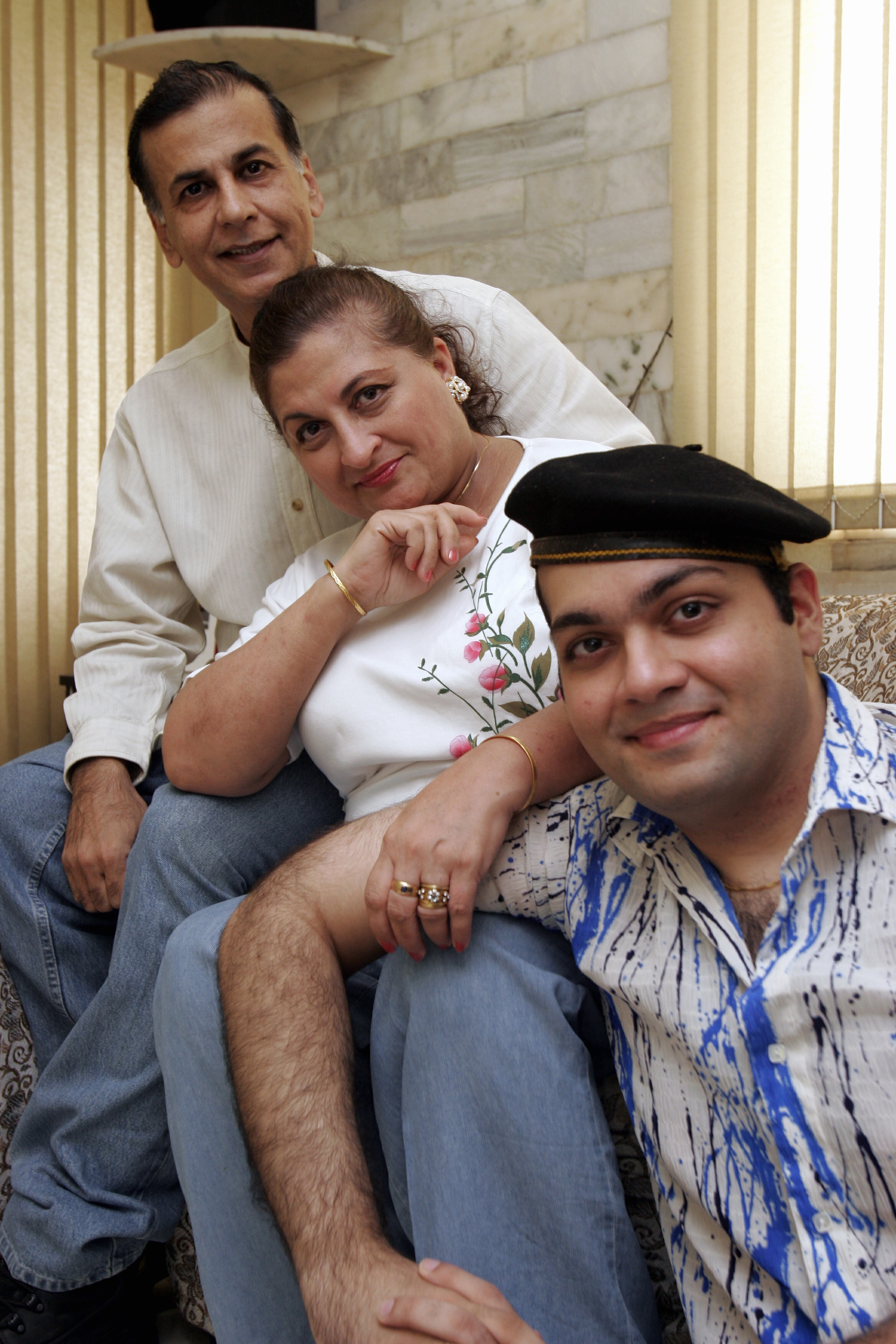
Vijay Arora with wife Dilber and son Farhad.

Arora was married to ex-model and Miss India, Dilber Debara, and they have a son Farhad.

== Death ==
Arora died on 2 February 2007 at his residence, due to a stomach ailment.

== Filmography ==
Year	Film	Character/Role	Notes
1972	Zaroorat	Vijay	
1972	Rakhi Aur Hathkadi	Prakash	
1972	Sabse Bada Sukh	Shankar	
1972	Mere Bhaiya	Subhash Sharma	
1973	Yaadon Ki Baaraat	Vijay	
1973	Phagun	Dr Suman	
1973	Ek Mutthi Aasmaan		
1973	Insaaf	Shankar	
1974	36 Ghante	Vijay	
1974	Roti	Shravan	
1975	Naatak		
1976	Jeevan Jyoti	Shekhar	
1977	Anand Mahal		
1978	Safed Haathi		
1978	Dil Aur Deewaar	Anand	
1979	Sargam	Dr Babu	Cameo
1979	Dikri Ane Gai Dore Tiva Jaye		Gujarati Film
1979	Gautam Govinda	Gopala	
1979	Nagin Aur Suhagin	Anand Singh	
1980	Zakhmon Ke Nishan		
1981	Jiyo To Aise Jiyo	Jagadish Sharma	
1981	Sannata	Vijay	
1981	Meri Aawaz Suno	Kulwant	
1981	Lekh Na Mathe Mekh		Gujarati Film
1982	Dulha Bikta Hai		
1982	Sati Aur Bhagwan		
1982	Yeh To Kamaal Ho Gaya	Adv. Mahesh Chander	
1983	Ek Din Bahu Ka	Brijmohan	
1983	Nishaan	Kumar Ratan Singh	
1983	Souten	Vijay	
1983	Bade Dilwala	Vijaykumar Gupta	
1984	Yaadgar	Dr Bhatnagar	
1985	Saaheb	Kamal Sharma	
1985	Bewafai	Doctor	
1986	Vidhaan		
1986	Amma		
1986	Avinash	Doctor	
1987	Awam	Thakur Suryabhan Singh	
1987	Daku Hasina	Somnath	Special appearance
1988	Sagar Sangam	Shivnath Shastru	
1988	Veerana	Petrol Pump Owner	
1988	Kartoot		
1989	Purani Haveli	Kumar	
1989	Dost Garibon Ka	Dinanath	
1990	Baap Numbri Beta Dus Numbri	CO Pratap Singh	
1991	Aakhri Cheekh	Advocate Prakash	
1991	100 Days	Doctor	Guest appearance
1992	Jaan Tere Naam	Ajay Malhotra	
1992	Vishwatma	Jailor	
1992	Netraheen Sakshi		
1993	Geetanjali	Sagar's brother-in-law	
2002	Aakheer	Satyaprakash Srivastav	Special appearance
2003	Indian Babu		
2007	Aaj Ka Neta	Editor Satyaprakash Srivastav	

=== Television ===
Year	Show	Role	Channel	Reference
1986	Vikram Aur Betaal	Various Roles as per story	DD National	
1987	Ramayan	Indrajit	DD National	
1988	Bharat Ek Khoj	Jahangir	DD National	Episodes 32,33 Akbar, episode 34 Golden Hind
1993	Zee Horror Show	Taveez episode 1993 3 Episodes	Zee Tv	Episodic Role
1998–1999	Lakeerein	Brijmohan	Zee TV	
