= Benazir (film) =

1964 film

- Directed by: S. Khalil
- Produced by: Bimal Roy Productions
- Starring: Ashok Kumar; Meena Kumari; Shashi Kapoor; Tanuja; Asit Sen
- Music by: Sachin Dev Burman
- Release date: 1964
- Language: Hindi

Benazir is a Hindi film released in 1964, starring Ashok Kumar, Meena Kumari, Shashi Kapoor and Tanuja, directed by S.Khalil and music by Sachin Dev Burman.

== Storyline ==
Benazir, a Muslim family drama, revolves around the film's key characters, Nawab, Anwar, Sahida and Benazir, among others. Nawab and Anwar are brothers who live in an upper-class neighborhood. Nawab is married and has a child. A bachelor, Anwar on seeing Sahida falls in love with her and proposes marriage to her. Although married, Nawab has an affair with Benazir, and keeps her as his mistress. The story takes a twist when Shauket, a family friend, tells Nawab that Anwar frequently sees Benazir. Nawab is furious when one day he sees Benazir in Anwar's arms. He is at a loss as to why his younger brother is seeing his mistress, when he is already in love with Sahida.

== Review ==
Although Shashi Kapoor as Anwar and Tanuja as Sahida only make brief appearances, they have done justice to their roles as a beautiful young cheerful pair.

The music of Bimal Roy's Benazir scored by the legendary S. D. Burman is praise-worthy and a special mention should be made of the song, "Mil jaa re jaan-e-jaana".

== Cast ==
- Ashok Kumar - Nawab
- Meena Kumari - Benazir
- Shashi Kapoor - Anwar
- Tanuja - Shahida
- Nirupa Roy - Nawab's wife
- Durga Khote
- Asit Sen
- Tarun Bose - Shauket

== Soundtrack ==
Benazir

Soundtrack album by Sachin Dev Burman
- Released: 1964 (India)
- Genre: Film soundtrack
- Label: His Master's Voice
- Producer: Sachin Dev Burman

Sachin Dev Burman chronology
Tere Ghar Ke Samne (1963)	Benazir (1964)	Kaise Kahoon (1964)

The soundtrack includes the following tracks, composed by Sachin Dev Burman with lyrics penned by Shakeel Badayuni.

Song	Singer (s)
"Gam Nahin Gar Zindagi Veeran Hai"	Asha Bhosle
"Main Shola Main Barkha"	Suman Kalyanpur, Mohd. Rafi
"Mil Ja Re Jane Jana"	Lata Mangeshkar
"Dil Mein Ek Jane Tamanna Ne"	Mohd. Rafi
"Alvida Jaane Wafa Meri Manzil Aa"	Lata Mangeshkar
"Baharon Ki Mehfil Suhani Rahegi"	Lata Mangeshkar
"Husn Ki Baharen Liye Aaye They Sanam"	Lata Mangeshkar
"Mubarak Hai Who Dil Jisko Kisi Se"	Lata Mangeshkar, Asha Bhosle, Usha Mangeshkar
"Ya Gafoor Rahim Ya Allah"	
