= Jeene Ki Raah =

1969 Bollywood drama film by L. V. Prasad

- Theatrical release poster
- Directed by: L. V. Prasad
- Written by: Mukhram Sharma (dialogues)
- Screenplay by: L. V. Prasad
- Story by: L. V. Prasad
- Based on: Bratuku Theruvu (1953)
- Produced by: L. V. Prasad
- Starring: Jeetendra; Tanuja; Sanjeev Kumar
- Cinematography: Dwarka Divecha
- Edited by: Shivaji Avdhut
- Music by: Laxmikant Pyarelal
- Production company: Prasad Productions Pvt Ltd
- Release date: 25 April 1969
- Running time: 153 minutes
- Country: India
- Language: Hindi
- Box office: 3.2 crore

Jeene Ki Raah (transl. Way of Life) is a 1969 Hindi-language drama film produced & directed by L. V. Prasad under the Prasad Productions Pvt. Ltd. banner. The film stars Jeetendra, Tanuja and Sanjeev Kumar and music composed by Laxmikant Pyarelal. It is a remake of the Telugu film Bratuku Teruvu (1953).

== Cast ==
- Jeetendra as Mohan
- Tanuja as Radha
- Sanjeev Kumar as Dr. Manohar
- Anjali Kadam as Shobha
- Manmohan Krishna as Kamalrai Mansukhlal
- Durga Khote as Janki
- Jagdeep as Sunder
- Bela Bose as Durga
- Roopesh Kumar as Ramdas
- Karan Dewan as Doctor
- Ram Mohan as Ranjan
- Sudhir Kumar as Manohar's Brother
- Meena T. as Sudha
- Viju Khote as Raghunandan
- C. S. Dubey as Raghunandan's Father

== Soundtrack ==
The soundtrack for this album was composed by the legendary music composer duo Laxmikant–Pyarelal, and won them Filmfare award for best music director in 1970. All songs written by Anand Bakshi. The song "Aane se Uske Aaye Bahar" and "Ek Banjara Gaye" sung by Mohammed Rafi became an evergreen song of the Indian music history. "Aap Mujhe Achhe Lagne Lage" won Lata Mangeshkar her last Filmfare award for best female playback singer.

Song	Singer
"Aap Mujhe Achhe Lagne"	Lata Mangeshkar
"Aa Mere Humjoli Aa, Khele Aankh Micholi Aa"	Lata Mangeshkar, Mohammed Rafi
"Chanda Ko Dhundne" (Male)	Mohammed Rafi
"Ek Banjara Gaaye"	Mohammed Rafi
"Aane Se Uske"-1	Mohammed Rafi
"Aane Se Uske"-2	Mohammed Rafi
"Aane Se Uske Aaye Bahar" (Short)	Mohammed Rafi, Bhupinder Singh
"Chanda Ko Dhundne Sabhi Taare Nikal Pade" (Female)	Asha Bhosle, Usha Mangeshkar, Hemlata

== Awards ==
- Filmfare Best Music Director Award – Laxmikant Pyarelal
- Filmfare Best Female Playback Award – Lata Mangeshkar for the song "Aap Mujhe Achhe Lagne"
