= Bhoot Bungla =

1965 Indian Hindi-language film

- Poster
- Directed by: Mehmood
- Written by: Mehmood; Ranjan Bose
- Screenplay by: Akhtar-Ul-Iman
- Produced by: Mehmood
- Starring: Mehmood; Tanuja; Nazir Hussain
- Cinematography: Dara Engineer
- Edited by: Vitthal Bankar
- Music by: R. D. Burman
- Release date: 1965
- Country: India
- Language: Hindi

Bhoot Bungla (transl. Haunted house) is a 1965 Indian Hindi-language horror comedy film directed by Mehmood, who stars in the film alongside Tanuja and Nazir Hussain. Music for this film was composed by R.D. Burman.

The film focuses on a supposedly haunted house and its resident family. The house's original owner was murdered and his immediate family disappeared without a trace. Half a century later, two of his heirs are murdered and a third one receives death threats.

== Plot ==
Fifty years ago, Kundanlal was murdered, and his wife and child vanished on a dark night at the haunted bungalow surrounded by jungle on the outskirts of Bombay.

In the present day, three brothers — Kundanlal's nephews — live in the bungalow: Shyamlal, Ramlal, and Ramu. On the eve of Rekha's return from London, Ramlal's daughter, Ramlal is killed in a car accident suspected to be murder. The suspicion is reinforced when Ramu is found hanging in his bedroom on the same night. Post-mortem reports reveal that he had been murdered before being hanged.

Shyamlal and Rekha move out of the bungalow and into their home in the city. However, Rekha begins receiving threatening phone calls warning of her death. She meets Mohan Kumar, the president of a local youth club, after he defeats her in a music competition. Rekha soon confides in Mohan about the calls, and he begins investigating them. Rekha and Mohan soon fall in love.

== Cast ==
Actor/Actress	Character
Mehmood	Mohan Kumar
Tanuja	Rekha
Nazir Hussain	Shyamlal
Harindranath Chattopadhyay	Doctor
Nana Palsikar	Ramlal 'Ramu'
Asit Sen	Dhamu
Jagdish Raj	Police Inspector Sawant
R. D. Burman	Youth Club Member (Stocky)

== Music ==
Bhoot Bungla

Soundtrack album by R.D. Burman
- Released: January 1, 1965
- Genre: Feature film soundtrack
- Length: 25:54
- Label: Saregama India
- Producer: R.D. Burman

R.D. Burman chronology
Chhote Nawab (1961)	Bhoot Bungla (1965)	Teesra Kaun (1965)

The music of this film was composed by R. D. Burman, along with Kishore Kumar. Hasrat Jaipuri penned the lyrics for the songs.

All lyrics are written by Hasrat Jaipuri; all music is composed by R.D. Burman.

Bhoot Bungla
No.	Title	Singer(s)	Length
1.	"O Mere Pyar Aaja"	Lata Mangeshkar	3:10
2.	"Jago Sonewalo Suno Meri Kahani"	Kishore Kumar	5:25
3.	"Bhoot Bungla"	Mehmood, R.D. Burman & Suresh	2:16
4.	"Ek Sawaal Hai"	Kishore Kumar	4:44
5.	"Pyar Karta Ja"	Manna Dey	6:05
6.	"Aao Twist Karen"	Manna Dey	4:11
Total length:			25:54
