= Kadambari (1976 film) =

- Directed by: H. K. Verma
- Written by: Amrita Pritam
- Starring: Vijay Arora; Shabana Azmi; Aparna Chowdhury
- Music by: Vilayat Khan
- Release date: 1976
- Country: India
- Language: Hindi

Kadambari is a 1976 Hindi language drama film directed by H. K. Verma. The film stars Vijay Arora and Shabana Azmi in lead roles. It was the debut film of playback singer Kavita Krishnamurthy's career.

== Cast ==
- Vijay Arora
- Shabana Azmi
- Aparna Choudhury

== Plot ==
The story revolves around the life of a kind-hearted and mature woman (Shabana) who falls in love with a shy man (Vijay Arora) who is afraid of her mother and how she convinces him to take control of his own life with sheer determination.

== Songs ==
The music was composed by Vilayat Khan.

- "Kyon Hum Tum Rahe Akele" - Ajit Singh
- "Aayega Aanewala" - Kavita Krishnamurthy
- "Ambar Ki Ek Paak Surahi" - Asha Bhosle

== Reception ==
Author Bibekanada Ray described the film as one of the low-budgeted films starring Azmi with "strong storylines and literary flavour". The Illustrated Weekly of India reported that Azmi had performed brilliantly in the film. The film did not attract an audience.
