= Sagar Sangam =

- Vinyl Records Cover
- Directed by: Dulal Guha
- Produced by: Dulal Guha
- Starring: Raakhee; Asha Parekh; Shatrughan Sinha; Mithun Chakraborty; Padmini Kolhapure; Anita Raj; Nana Patekar; Johnny Walker; Prem Chopra; Utpal Dutt
- Music by: Bappi Lahiri
- Release date: 1988
- Running time: 120 minutes
- Country: India
- Language: Hindi

Sagar Sangam is a 1988 Hindi-language film. A family drama, it had a very long delayed release. The film was announced in 1985, had its records released in 1986. It stars Raakhee, Asha Parekh, Shatrughan Sinha, Mithun Chakraborty, Padmini Kolhapure, Anita Raj, Nana Patekar, Johnny Walker, Prem Chopra, Utpal Dutt. The music was composed by Bappi Lahiri.

== Plot ==
Ganga's husband is accused of robbery and sent to prison. Outside the court, a conman kidnaps her infant son and goes to sell him to Chhaganlal. However, his childless wife Yashoda adopts the boy.

Unexpectedly, the police arrive and apprehend Chhaganlal, who is then sentenced to several years in prison for his crimes, which include kidnapping infants and selling them off.

When he comes out, he takes away his wife and abandons her adopted son Gopi, who is raised by a criminal named Ramu Ustad, who has his eyes on the treasure of the Devipur Temple.

Gopi grows up to become a thief, gets arrested by Inspector Arjun Sharma, and gets externed from Bombay — present-day Mumbai. That means he has to go stay outside the city and report regularly at a police station.

By a quirk of fate, Gopi ends up in Devipur, where Ganga runs a temple trust. She initially does not allow Gopi to enter the temple as he is a criminal.

However, Gopi finds a sister in Subhadra and falls in love with village-belle Radha. He takes note of illegal activities of Dayal Das — Chagganlal has revamped himself — in the village.

He eventually recognises Yashoda as his adoptive mother, but does not approach them.

Meanwhile, Arjun — transferred to Devipur — has fallen for Subhadra and finds out the truth about Dayal Das. He and Gopi team up to expose him.

Ramu Ustad reaches the village to rob its hidden treasure. He turns out to be more significant to Gopi's life than anticipated.

Meanwhile, Arjun and Gopi find out that there is one more powerful person who is pulling the strings, and eventually nab the individual.

== Cast ==
- Shatrughan Sinha as Inspector Arjun Sharma
- Raakhee as Ganga
- Mithun Chakraborty as Gopal/Gopi Ustad
- Padmini Kolhapure as Radha
- Anita Raj as Subhadra
- Prem Chopra as Chhaganlal/Dayal Das
- Asha Parekh as Yashoda
- Nana Patekar as Ramu Ustad
- Vijay Arora as Pandit
- Prema Narayan as Mary
- Johnny Walker as Inspector Shamsher Singh
- Utpal Dutt as Bhujang Chaudhary
- Goga Kapoor as Thakur
- Jagdish Raj as Police Superintendent
- Sudhir Pandey as CID Inspector Jaishankar
- Paintal as Girdhari
- Birbal as Manglu
- Mac Mohan as Maqbool
- Satyen Kappu as Binu
- T. P. Jain as Lallu

== Songs ==
Song	Singer
"Ab To Yahi Sapne"	Lata Mangeshkar
"Patit Pavani"	Lata Mangeshkar
"Ek Mamta"	Lata Mangeshkar
"Nanha Sa Tan"	Lata Mangeshkar
"Humri Mano To"	Asha Bhosle
"Gaon Ki Chhori"	Asha Bhosle, Bappi Lahiri
"Man Bairagi, Tohe Dhunde Shyam"	Chandrani Mukherjee, Kavita Krishnamurthy
