= Fiffty Fiffty =

1981 Hindi-language Indian film

- Directed by: Shomu Mukherjee
- Produced by: Shomu Mukherjee
- Starring: Rajesh Khanna; Tina Munim
- Music by: Laxmikant–Pyarelal
- Release date: 13 November 1981
- Running time: 136 minutes
- Country: India
- Language: Hindi

Fiffty Fiffty is a 1981 Indian Hindi romance drama film directed by Shomu Mukherjee, starring Rajesh Khanna and Tina Munim.

== Plot ==
Thakur Virendra Singh lives a wealthy lifestyle in India along with his wife and a son, Kishan. His relative Bihari is envious, and successfully switches his son, Kumar, with Kishan, and also ends up killing Virendra. In this manner, Kumar grows up living a wealthy lifestyle, while Kishan lives a poor lifestyle, shunned by his father and his mother, who has lost the use of her vocal cords. Bihari takes Kishan to his brother in Bombay and leaves him there to lead a life of crime. Twenty years later, Kishan has grown up and is now a master burglar. He meets with another burglar, Mary, and both decide to be fifty-fifty partners. However, Mary has other plans: she ditches Kishan and joins forces with Diwan Shamsher Singh to masquerade as the long-lost daughter of Ranimaa of Chandpur. Mary does not know that it was the Diwan who has done away with Rajkumari Ratna, and he will not hesitate to kill Mary - or anyone else who dares to stand in his way and the treasure of Chandpur.

== Cast ==
- Rajesh Khanna as Kishan Singh
- Tina Munim as Mary / Rajkumari Ratna
- Kader Khan as Diwan Shamsher Singh
- Ranjeet as Kumar Virendra Singh
- Om Shivpuri as Bihari Singh
- Jagdeep as Photographer / Kidnapper
- Nazir Hussain as Mary's Foster Father
- Indrani Mukherjee as Shanti B. Singh
- Anita Guha as Chandpur's Ranimaa
- Purnima as Thakurain V. Singh
- Shashi Kiran as Chandpur's Army Officer
- Jagdish Raj as Chandpur's Trustee
- P Jairaj as Tiwari
- Johnny Whisky
- Jankidas as Hotel Manager
- Mustaque Merchant as
- Roopesh Kumar as Shamsher Goon
- Nilu Bhalla as Shamsher Goon
- Bhagwan Dada as Dancer

== Soundtrack ==
Lyrics: Anand Bakshi

Song	Singer
"Dilwala Aaya Hai"	Kishore Kumar
"Jane Do Mujhe Yaaron"	Kishore Kumar
"Pyar Ka Vaada, Fiffty Fiffty"	Kishore Kumar, Asha Bhosle
"Chhod Maza Haath, Mala Peene De"	Amit Kumar, Asha Bhosle
"Jogan Ban Gayi Chhodke Main Saara Sansar"	Asha Bhosle
"Pardesi O Pardesi"	Asha Bhosle
"Jhumo Nacho Gao"	Chorus
