= Sabse Bada Sukh =

- Directed by: Hrishikesh Mukherjee
- Starring: Naarghita
- Release date: 8 December 1972
- Country: India
- Language: Hindi

Sabse Bada Sukh is a 1972 Bollywood drama film directed by Hrishikesh Mukherjee.

== Plot ==
The village-born Lalloo relocates to Bombay, and returns a wealthy man. He goes to meet his friend, Shankar alias Bhompu, and together they share tales, mostly about women, sex, and playboy magazines' pictures. A Bollywood movie director is shooting a film nearby, and they go and meet him and his beautiful actress, Urvashi. After meeting Urvashi, Shankar feigns a racking cough, and tells his family that he must go to Bombay, and seek medical treatment. Together he and Lalloo take the next train to Bombay to see if they can find the biggest happiness in life.

== Cast ==
- Vijay Arora as Shankar
- G. Asrani as Asrani, Movie Director
- Kumud Damle
- Utpal Dutt as Vedji
- Meeta Faiyyaz
- Rabi Ghosh as Lalloo
- Tarun Ghosh as Pandit chacha
- Sanjeev Kumar as a Narrator
- Keshto Mukherjee as Guide at railway station
- Meena Rai
- Rajnibala as Urvashi, Movie Actress
- Tun Tun
