= Apni Nagariya =

1940 film

- Directed by: Gunjal
- Written by: Saadat Hasan Manto
- Starring: Shobhana Samarth; Nazir; Jayant; K. N. Singh
- Cinematography: S. Hardip
- Music by: Rafiq Ghaznavi
- Production company: Hindustan Cinetone
- Release date: 1940
- Country: India
- Language: Hindi

Apni Nagariya is a 1940 Indian Hindi-language film directed by Gunjal and written by Saadat Hasan Manto. It stars Shobhana Samarth, K. N. Singh, Nazir, and Jayant.

The film was produced under the Hindustan Cinetone banner and had music composed by Rafiq Ghaznavi.
