= Asit Sen (actor) =

Indian film actor and director (1917–1993)

- Born: 13 May 1917; Gorakhpur, United Provinces of Agra and Oudh, British India
- Died: 18 September 1993 (aged 76); Calcutta, West Bengal, India
- Other name: Asit Kumar Sen
- Occupations: Actor, Film director
- Years active: 1949–1993
- Notable work: Bees Saal Baad

Asit Sen (13 May 1917 – 18 September 1993) was an Indian film director turned famous comedian in the Hindi film industry. He directed 2 films and starred in over 200 films between 1953 and 1993 until his death. As an actor/comedian, he often portrayed a character with authority, such as a police inspector or landlord, but with comic effect, mostly as a slow-speaking person. His acting career was particularly prolific in the 1960s, 1970s, and early 1980s. He had a very thin voice, in striking contrast to his huge physical frame and spoke his dialogues at a slow pace.

Sen started his career, assisting director-producer Bimal Roy in Kolkata, however, the Kolkata-based film industry was now on the decline, thus Roy shifted base to Bombay (now Mumbai) along with Roy's team in 1950, which included Sen, Hrishikesh Mukherjee, Nabendu Ghosh, Kamal Bose and later Salil Chaudhury. Along with doing small roles in films he directed two films for his mentor's production house, Parivar (1956) and Apradhi Kaun (1957), before choosing acting as his full time career, playing comic roles with almost every known name in the industry.

== Filmography ==
=== Hindi ===
Year	Film	Character	Notes
1949	Chhota Bhai		
1950	Pehla Aadmi	Romesh	
1955	Amanat	Ganesh	
1956	Parivar		The Director
1957	Apradhi Kaun		The Director
1958	Chalti Ka Naam Gaadi	as dead man	
1959	Sujata	Pandit Bhawani Shankar Sharma	
1960	Parakh	Bhanju Babu	
1961	Kabuliwala	Bhola	
1961	Chhaya	Dharad	
1961	Junglee	Doctor	
1962	Bees Saal Baad	Gopichand Jasoos	
1962	Baat Ek Raat Ki	Ramu	
1963	Bandini	Shambu	
1964	Benazir		
1964	Chandi Ki Deewar		
1965	Mere Sanam	Gopi Chand Police Inspector	
1965	Chand Aur Suraj	Dindayal Choudhury	
1965	Bhoot Bungla	Dhamu (Servant)	
1967	Naunihal	School-teacher	
1967	Nai Roshni	Moti	
1967	Jaal	Rita's Uncle	
1967	Chandan Ka Palna	Sevaram Seth	
1967	Upkar	Lakhpati	
1968	Brahmachari	Moti	
1968	Do Dooni Char	Sevak	Double role
1969	Do Raaste	Alopee Prasad	
1969	Yakeen	Bhola (Servant)	
1969	Aradhana	Tikaram (Servant)	
1969	Pyar Ka Mausam	Kunvar Saheb	
1969	Tamanna	Raja Ram	
1969	Beti	vaid	
1970	Purab Aur Paschim	Servant	
1970	Chetna		
1970	Pagla Kahin Ka		
1970	Abhinetri	Narayan	
1971	Upaasna		
1971	Majhli Didi	Babunath (prosecuting lawyer)	
1971	Buddha Mil Gaya	Jhunjhunwala	
1971	Mera Gaon Mera Desh	Motumal (drunk)	
1971	Anand	Dr. Bhaskar Banerjee's Amitabh Bachchan patient	
1971	Door Ka Raahi	Bholu Kaka	
1971	Bikhre Moti		
1971	Chahat		
1971	Mere Apne	Biloki Prashad	
1972	Amar Prem	Chander	
1972	Bombay To Goa	Dhaba Owner	
1972	Annadata	Motu Bhandari	
1972	Anuraag	D'Souza	
1972	Bandhe Haath	Sethji (Roopkala Theatre Owner)	
1972	Do Chor	Bhagwan Dass	
1972	Dushman	Harishankar Chaurasiya (Head Constable)	
1973	Charitra		
1973	Chor Machaye Shor		
1973	Chowkidar	Munim	
1973	Dharma	Seth Garib Dass	
1974	Imtihan	Professor	
1974	Anjaan Raahen		
1974	Roti Kapda Aur Makaan	Kaka (villager who transformed "Poonam" into a village girl)	
1974	Charitraheen		
1974	Chhote Sarkar		
1975	Amanush	Pujari	Bilingual in Bengali
1975	Chaitali		Remake of the 1971 Bengali film of the same name
1975	Zorro	Daroga-Soldier	
1976	Balika Badhu	Udasu	
1976	Bajrang Bali	Khumbkaran	
1976	Ginny Aur Johnny	Bhoosamal (Police Constable)	
1976	Bairaag		
1977	Anand Ashram	Girdhari	Bilingual in Bengali
1977	Anurodh	(Music Station Manager)	
1977	Bandie		
1978	Ghar	Chatterjee	
1978	Devata	Doctor Shambhunath	
1979	Jurmana	Dr Kabir	
1979	Chhath Maiya Ki Mahima		
1979	Bombay By Nite		
1980	Judaai	Constable Dinanath Tiwari	
1980	Ram Balram	Inspector EK Mukherjee	
1980	Aanchal	(Government Official)	
1981	Barsaat Ki Ek Raat	Police inspector	
1982	Doosra Roop		
1985	Aar Paar		
1990	Aakhri Baazi	Announcer	

=== Bengali ===
Year	Film	Role	Notes
1975	Amanush	Pujari	
1977	Anand Ashram	Girdhari	
1981	Anushandhan	Police Inspector	Bengali version of Barsaat ki Ek Raat
