= Shobhna Samarth =

Indian actress and director (1916–2000)

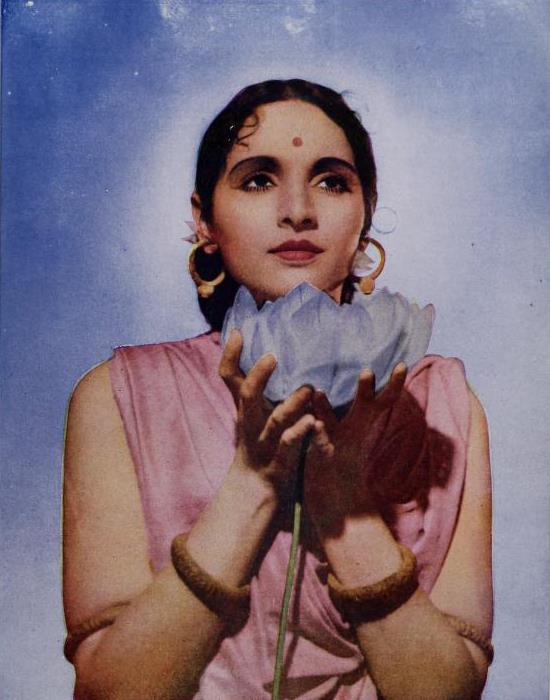
- Samarth in Bharat Milap (1942) as Sita
- Born: Saroj Shilotri; 17 November 1916; Bombay, Bombay Presidency, British India (present-day Mumbai, Maharashtra, India)
- Died: 9 February 2000 (aged 83); Pune, Maharashtra, India
- Other name: Shobhana Samarth
- Occupations: Actress, director, producer
- Spouse: Kumarsen Samarth (m. 1935; sep. 1950; d. 1970)
- Partner: Motilal
- Children: 4; incl. Nutan and Tanuja
- Mother: Rattan Bai
- Relatives: See Samarth family

Shobhna Samarth (née Saroj Shilotri; 17 November 1916 – 9 February 2000), also sometimes known as Shobhana Samarth, was an Indian actress, film director and producer. She began her career in the early days of talkie movies in the Hindi film industry and continued in lead roles into the 1950s.

She started in Marathi cinema. Her first Hindi film, Nigahen Nafrat, was released in 1935. She is best remembered for her portrayal of Sita in Ram Rajya (1943). In 1997, she was honoured with the Filmfare Special Award for her contribution to the arts.

Shobhna later produced and directed a pair of movies that launched the careers of her daughters, Nutan and Tanuja.

== Early life ==
Shobhna was born on 17 November 1916 in Bombay, British India (now Mumbai, India), as Saroj Shilotri. An only child, her father, Prabhakar Shilotri, was a "pioneer banker", having started the Shilotri Bank in Bombay. Her mother Rattan Bai, in 1936, acted in the film Frontiers of Freedom, in Marathi (Swarajyachya Seemewar).

Shobhna studied initially in Cathedral School, Bombay, for one year. In 1928, her father suffered financial losses and the business went into liquidation. The family then shifted to Bangalore in 1931, where Shobhna attended Baldwin Girls High School. To earn a living, her father taught students on a private basis, while her mother taught in a Marathi school. In December 1931, her father died of a heart attack. Her mother and daughter returned to Bombay to stay with her maternal uncle. Shobhna studied in a convent school, but was unable to complete her matriculation, as she had begun her film career by then. Shobhna also taught privately to make money.

During this time, she met her future husband Kumarsen Samarth, who had just returned from Germany and was keen on directing films. They got engaged and she started work on her first film. Her uncle was opposed to her acting in films, and she and her mother moved out of his home (ironically his daughter and Shobhna's cousin Nalini Jaywant herself became an actress).

== Career ==
Shobhna's first film was Orphans Of Society (1935), also called Nigahe Nafrat or Vilasi Ishwar for Kolhapur Cinetone, directed by Vinayak and starring Vinayak and Baburao Pendharkar. The film was not a success, but Shobhna was critically acclaimed for her role.

The film was made in Urdu and Marathi. Shobhna claimed in an interview that she did not know any Urdu at that time of filming, speaking the dialogues by rote and it was only later that she picked up the language. She was with Kolhapur Cinetone for thirteen months, but acted in one film.

Shobhna left Kolhapur Cinetone and joined Sagar Movietone (Sagar Film Company), acting in a film called Kokila (1937), directed by Sarvottam Badami, starring Motilal, Sabita Devi and Sitara Devi. Her other film for Sagar was Do Diwane (1936), directed by C. M. Luhar and co-starring Motilal, Yakub and Aruna Devi. By the end of 1937, Shobhna had left Sagar and joined General Films, acting in Industrial India (Nirala Hindustan), directed by Mohan Sinha with Prem Adib and Wasti. The second film for them was Pati Patni (1939), directed by V. M. Gunjal with co-stars Yakub, Sitara Devi and Wasti.

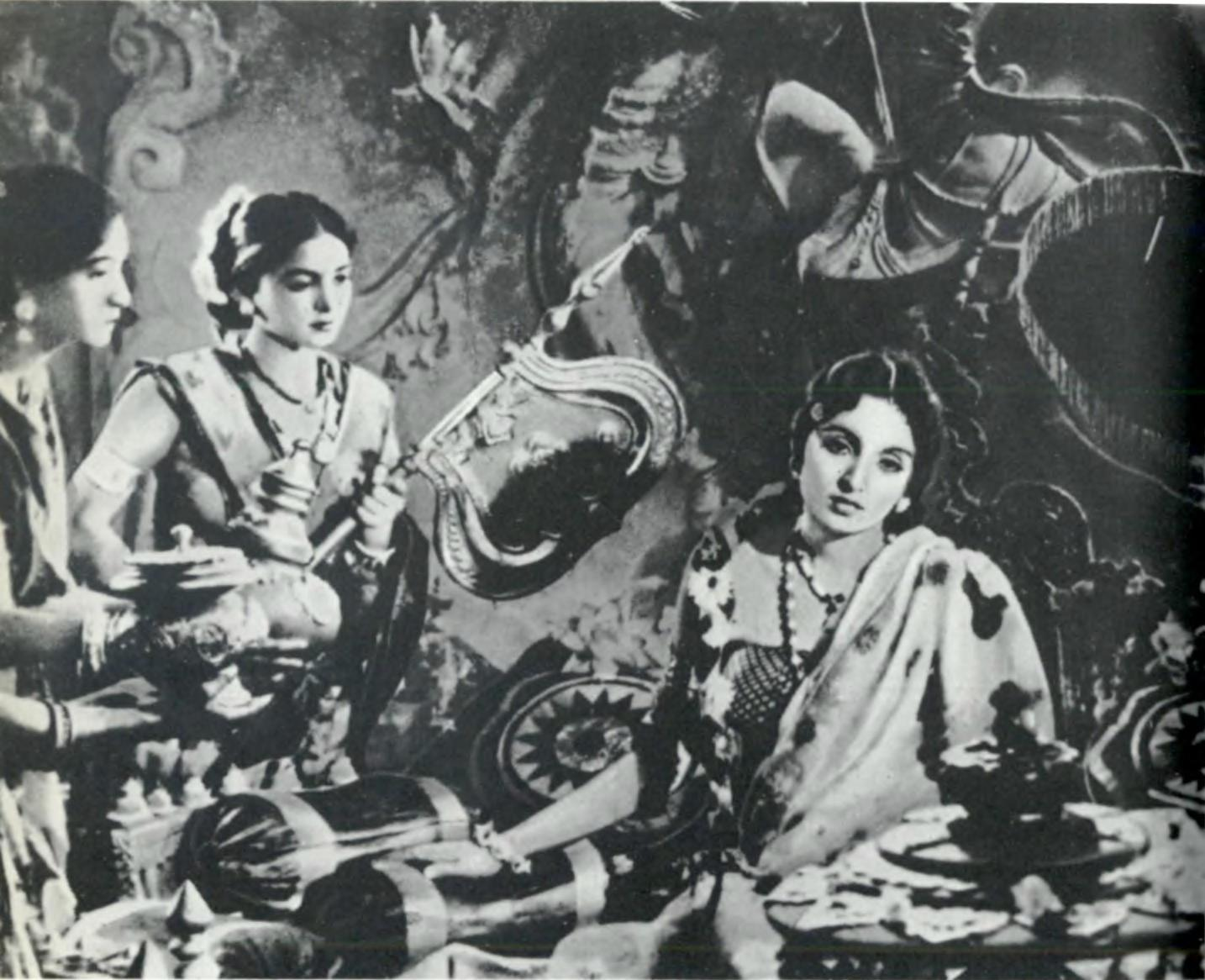
Shobhna Samarth (right) as Sita in Ram Rajya (1943)

By 1939, she had joined Hindustan Cinetone, making four films with them, which included Kaun Kisi ka (1939), Saubhagya (1940) by C. M. Luhar, and Apni Nagariya (1940) by V. M. Gunjal. She then worked in a film directed by her husband, Kumar Sen Samarth, called Ghar Javai (1941), where she was cast with Damuanna Malvankar.

In 1942, she won a career-defining role, in Bharat Milap, directed by Vijay Bhatt and starring Durga Khote as Kaikeyi, Shobhna as Sita and Prem Adib as Ram. Following this was Ram Rajya in 1943, and Shobhna became identified as Sita, leading to several other films where they recreated the roles. Shobhna as Sita and Prem Adib as Rama became extremely popular and were accepted by audiences and were featured as Rama and Sita on calendars.

== Personal life ==
Shobhna was married to director and cinematographer Kumarsen Samarth on 8 February 1935 at Belgaum. They had three daughters, Nutan, Tanuja and Chatura and a son, Jaideep. Eventually, the couple parted amicably. Shobhna became linked to actor Motilal Rajvansh. Two of her daughters, Nutan and Tanuja, also became actresses. Shobhna produced their debut films. Her other daughter, Chatura, is an artist and her son Jaideep is an advertising film producer. Chatura and Jaideep never acted in films.

Nutan's son, Mohnish Bahl, is also an actor as are Tanuja's daughters Kajol and Tanishaa Mukerji. Kajol is married to actor Ajay Devgn. Other members of the dynasty include Shomu Mukherjee, who married Tanuja.

Shobhna and her daughter Nutan were estranged for more than two decades but reconciled in 1983. Nutan died of cancer in 1991. At her own death from cancer in 2000, Shobhna had seven granddaughters, one grandson, three great-granddaughters, and two great-grandsons.

== Filmography ==
=== As actress ===
- Vilasi Ishwar (1935)
- Nigah-e-Nafrat (1935)
- Do Diwane (1936)
- Kokila (1937)
- Pati Patni (1939)
- Apni Nagariya (1940)
- Vilayati Babu (1940)
- Bharat Milap (1942)
- Savera (1942)
- Vijay Lakshmi (1943)
- Ram Rajya (1943)
- Naukar (1943)
- Mahasati Ansuya (1943)
- Veer Kunal (1945)
- Taramati (1945)
- Shahkar (1947)
- Sati Toral (1947)
- Malika (1947)
- Rambaan (1948)
- Narasinha Avatar (1949)
- Hamari Beti (1950)
- Ram Janma (1951)
- Insaniyat (1955)
- Love in Simla (1960)
- Chhalia (1960)
- Chitralekha (1964)
- Nai Umar Ki Nai Fasal (1965)
- Wahan Ke Log (1967)
- Ek Bar Mooskura Do (1972)
- Do Chor (1972)
- Panitheeratha Veedu (1973)
- Hamar Bhauji (1983)
- Ghar Dwaar (1985)

=== As director ===
- Hamari Beti (1950)
- Chhabili (1960)
- Shaukar, produced and directed by S. Khalil
