= Do Chor =

- Poster
- Directed by: Padmanabh
- Screenplay by: G. R. Kamat
- Story by: G. R. Kamat
- Dialogues by: Krishan Chander
- Produced by: Raj Khosla
- Starring: Dharmendra; Tanuja
- Cinematography: V. N. Reddy
- Edited by: Waman Bhonsle
- Music by: R. D. Burman
- Production company: Raj Khosla Films
- Distributed by: Shemaroo Entertainment
- Release date: 29 December 1972
- Country: India
- Language: Hindi

Do Chor (transl. Two thieves) is a 1972 Hindi romantic drama film produced by Raj Khosla and directed by Padmanabh. It stars Dharmendra, Tanuja, Shobhana Samarth, K.N. Singh, Trilok Kapoor and Jalal Agha. The music is by R.D. Burman and the lyrics by Majrooh Sultanpuri. The film was successful at the box office.

== Plot ==
A series of mysterious burglaries takes place at the homes of four wealthy men. The burglar steals a single piece of jewellery from each house, leaving cash and other valuables untouched and a swastika as a calling card. The police suspect Tony, who is widely known in the community as a thief, but he maintains his innocence. Determined to identify the real burglar, Tony investigates and catches Sandhya stealing from one of the wealthy men.

Sandhya explains that she is reclaiming her rightful inheritance, as the four men swindled her mother out of her possessions following her father's death. Her mother is now in a mental institution. As Tony helps Sandhya recover the stolen items and expose the men, the two fall in love. Together, they succeed in bringing the four men to justice and securing their imprisonment.

Sandhya's mother recovers, while Tony and Sandhya receive short jail sentences. They promise to begin a new life together once their sentences are completed.

== Cast ==
- Dharmendra as Tony
- Tanuja as Sandhya
- K. N. Singh as Tribhuvan Singh
- Shobhna Samarth as Mrs. Vikram Singh
- Trilok Kapoor as Police Commissioner
- Jagdish Raj as Police Inspector
- Bhagwan Dada as Police Constable
- Laxmi Chhaya as Chameli
- Dhumal as Tikamdas
- Sajjan as Ramsharan
- Murad as Advocate
- Randhir as Seth Charandas
- Krishnakant as Gopichand
- Asit Sen as Bhagwandas
- Leela Mishra as Mrs. Bhagwandas
- Jalal Agha as Badru
- Mohan Choti as Kaalia
- Gurnam Singh as Jaggu

== Music and soundtrack ==
The music of the film was composed by R. D. Burman and the lyrics were penned by Majrooh Sultanpuri. The film had popular songs like "Kali Palak Teri Gori", "Chahe Raho Door" and "Yaari Ho Gayi Yaar Se".

Song	Singer
"Yaari Ho Gayi Yaar Se"	Lata Mangeshkar
"Mora Chhota Sa Balamwa"	Lata Mangeshkar
"Chahe Raho Door, Chahe Raho Paas"	Lata Mangeshkar, Kishore Kumar
"Kali Palak Teri Gori Khulne Lagi Hai Thodi Thodi"	Lata Mangeshkar, Kishore Kumar
"Meri Jaan, Meri Jaan"	Kishore Kumar
