= Paisa Ya Pyar =

- Directed by: Javar Seetharaman
- Written by: G. Balasubramaniam (story); K. S. Gopalakrishnan (screenplay); Mukhram Sharma (dialogue)
- Produced by: A. Veerappan
- Starring: Ashok Kumar; Biswajeet; Mala Sinha; Tanuja; Shashikala
- Cinematography: Tyagraj Pendharkar
- Edited by: R. Bhaskar
- Music by: Ravi; Sahir Ludhianvi (lyricist)
- Release date: 1969
- Running time: 165 mins
- Country: India
- Language: Hindi

Paisa Ya Pyar (transl. money or love) is a 1969 Indian Hindi-language film directed by Jawar N. Sitaraman. The film stars Ashok Kumar, Biswajeet, Mala Sinha, Tanuja and Shashikala. The lyrics were written by Sahir Ludhianvi. The film was a remake of the Tamil film Panama Pasama.

== Cast ==
- Ashok Kumar as Mohanlal
- Biswajeet as Shekhar
- Mala Sinha as Shanti: Mohanlal's daughter
- Tanuja as Dhanwanti "Dhanno"
- Shashikala as Lakshmi
- Gajanan Jagirdar as Shankarlal: Shekhar's father
- Sharad Kumar as Deepak: Mohanlal's son
- Moti as Dog

== Music ==
Soundtrack was composed by Ravi. The song "Ber Liyo" is based on "Elantha Pazham" from Panama Pasama.

Song	Singer
"Ber Liyo, Ber Liyo"	Asha Bhosle
"Jane Kyun Baar Baar"	Asha Bhosle
"Mil Le, Mil Le, Mujhe Chhu Nahi Waise Hi Mil Le"	Mohammed Rafi, Asha Bhosle
"Insanon Ne Paise Ke Liye"	Hemant Kumar
"Tu Bhi Number Ek Hai Pyare"	Kishore Kumar, Asha Bhosle
