= Amma (1986 film) =

1986 film directed by Jiten

- Promotional poster
- Directed by: Jiten
- Produced by: B. B. Katra; Jiten G H
- Starring: Mithun Chakraborty; Raakhee; Ashok Kumar; Neeta Mehta; Suresh Oberoi; Vijay Arora; Shashikala; Mallika Sarabhai
- Music by: Raj Kamal
- Release date: 9 May 1986
- Running time: 135 minutes
- Country: India
- Language: Hindi
- Budget: Rs 2 Crores

Amma is a 1986 Indian Hindi-language film directed by Jiten and produced by B. B. Katra and Jiten himself, starring Mithun Chakraborty, Vijay Arora, Raakhee, and Ashok Kumar.

== Summary ==
Shanta (Rakhee Gulzar) and Prabin (Suresh Oberoi) get married. Nabin (Mithun Chakraborty) is Prabin's younger brother. On the day of marriage, the police raid the house, but did not get Nabin. The reason for Nabin's crime is not disclosed. Then Nabin meets Shanta in the bus, but the police attacks the bus and Nabin escapes again. Meantime, Prabin wins the case of their old ancestral property. Nabin meets family friend Suraj (Vijay Arora) and knows about Shanta's delivery of a boy. Prabin was murdered by his relative and the blame falls on Nabin. However Nabin later proves his innocence in front of everyone. Soon dejected Shanta with her children and father-in-law had to leave the city. They had a struggled living. Meantime Nabin gets caught by police for the murder of Prabin and sentenced to death. Suraj, who was also Shanta's childhood friend advises Shanta to make pickles and sell it to make money. Shanta follows his advice and starts the pickle factory. Now her father-in-law also passes away. Her son gets married, as well as daughter. Suraj also dies. Now Shanta makes a will and leaves home. Everyone searches for her, but unable to find her. Shanta's grandson Raju finds her in the station. Everyone understand their mistakes and apologises to Shanta. Finally Shanta dies, and her granddaughter Shobha gives birth to a daughter, now everybody believes that their Amma Shanta is born again as Shobha's granddaughter.

== Cast ==
- Mithun Chakraborty as Nabin
- Raakhee
- Ashok Kumar
- Urmila Bhatt
- Neeta Mehta
- Suresh Oberoi
- Tom Alter
- Bijaya Jena
- Bob Christo
- Vijay Arora
- Shashikala
- Manik Irani
- Priti Sapru
- Khushbu Sundar
- Mallika Sarabhai
- Paintal
- Salim Ghouse
- Ramesh Goyal

== Songs ==
1. "Ek Tha Raaja Ek Thi Raani" - Sushma Shrestha, Anand Kumar C, Hemlata, Viraj Upadhyay
2. "Mai Hu Teri Amma" - Anand Kumar C, Sulakshana Pandit
3. "Mai Hu Teri Amma" (part 2) - Sulakshana Pandit
4. "Rock Rock Baby Masti Me" - Kalyani Mitra, Sushma Shrestha, Amit Kumar
5. "Taqdeer Se Lad Na Sake Koi" - Anand Kumar C.
6. "Tumhe Kasam Hai Apni Ma Ki" - Anand Kumar C, Hariharan, Shailendra Singh
