= Rajkumari (1970 film) =

1970 Bengali musical film by Salil Sen

- Theatrical poster
- Directed by: Salil Sen
- Screenplay by: Salil Sen
- Story by: Salil Sen
- Produced by: Debesh Ghosh; Ranjana Ghosh
- Starring: Uttam Kumar; Tanuja; Chhaya Devi; Pahari Sanyal; Bhanu Banerjee; Jahar Roy
- Cinematography: Krishna Chakraborty
- Edited by: Baidyanath Chatterjee
- Music by: R. D. Burman
- Production company: Loknath Chitramandir
- Distributed by: Shree Bishnu Pictures Pvt. Ltd.
- Release date: 2 October 1970
- Country: India
- Language: Bengali

Rajkumari (Bengali pronunciation: [rad͡ʒkumari] transl. Princess) is a 1970 Indian Bengali-language masala film written and directed by Salil Sen. Produced by Debesh Ghosh and Ranjana Ghosh under the banner of Loknath Chitramandir, the film stars Uttam Kumar and Tanuja in lead roles, while Chhaya Devi, Pahari Sanyal, Bhanu Banerjee, Jahar Roy, Dipti Roy and Tarun Kumar play another supporting roles, with Helen in a guest appearance. The film plots a princess Manju, confined to the rules under his mother's supervision, falling in love with an insurance agent Nirmal, while things get unexpected when Nirmal meets with an accident and loses his eyesight, on the wedding day.

Written by Sen himself, the film is partially inspired by American film Roman Holiday (1953). It marks the second collaboration between Sen and Kumar, and also is the third film of Kumar and Tanuja as the lead pair. Predominantly shot in Kolkata, while portions of the filming took places in Mumbai. Music of the film is composed by R. D. Burman in his debut in Bengali cinema, with lyrics penned by Gauriprasanna Mazumder. Krishna Chakraborty handled its cinematography, and Baidyanath Chatterjee edited the film.

Rajkumari was theatrically released on 2 October 1970, coinciding with Durga Puja. After the release, it received negative critical reviews and a tepid commercial response, but favourable word-of-mouth publicity helped it to become a box office success. Each songs of the film were chartbuster upon its release, which were later reused by Burman himself in his Hindi albums.

== Plot ==
Manju's mother was a very strict disciplinarian. One day, Manju heard Nirmal singing and fell in love with him. Nirmal went to Manju's mother and expressed his desire to learn singing from Manju. However, Manju's mother rejected his proposal. Every day, Manju would visit Nirmal's sister's house to do needlework; it was there that their romance blossomed. Eventually, Manju's mother forbade her from continuing her sewing visits. When Manju's mother discovered the truth about their relationship, Nirmal and Manju decided to get married. Tragically, however, their wedding was called off after Nirmal was blinded in a car accident. Believing that Nirmal had deceived her, Manju set out to find him. Unable to locate him, she decided to marry someone else; yet, on the very day of her wedding, she learned that Nirmal was staying at his sister's house. Finally, Manju uncovered the whole truth. In the end, truth prevailed; weeping, they embraced one another.

== Cast ==
- Uttam Kumar as Nirmal Chowdhury, an insurance agent / Indrajit, a professional singer
- Tanuja as Manjari / Manju, the princess of Kamalapur
- Chhaya Devi as Anuradha Devi / Rani Maa
- Pahari Sanyal as Pramathesh Banerjee, Anuradha's elder brother
- Tarun Kumar as Rani Maa's Manager
- Bhanu Banerjee as Prasanna Bhattacharya
- Jahar Roy as Prajapati
- Dipti Roy as Labanya, Nirmal's elder sister
- Asit Baran as Prashanta, Labanya's husband
- Ajoy Ganguly as Mathuresh
- Sailen Ganguly as lawyer
- Helen in a guest appearance in the item number "Ki Je Bhabi"

== Music ==
Rajkumari

Soundtrack album to Rajkumari by R. D. Burman
- Released: 1970
- Genre: Feature Film Soundtrack
- Length: 20:12
- Language: Bengali
- Label: Saregama
- Producer: R. D. Burman

R. D. Burman chronology
Raaton Ka Raja (1970)	Rajkumari (1970)	Kati Patang (1971)
External audio
- Rajkumari Audio Jukebox on YouTube

Music of the film is composed by R. D. Burman in his debut in Bengali cinema, as well as first collaboration with Kumar. The soundtrack consists of six tracks penned by Gauriprasanna Mazumder.

The tune of each song was later reused by Burman himself in his Hindi films, such as "Gun Gun Gun Kunje Amar" into "Pyaar Deewana Hota Hai" in Kati Patang (1971), "E Ki Holo" into "Yeh Kya Hua" in Amar Prem (1972), "Ki Je Bhabi" into "Yeh Jawani Hai Deewani" in Jawani Diwani (1972), "Ki Bolite Ele" into "Dekho Yeh Mere Bandhe Haath" in Bandhe Haath (1973), "Bondho Dwarer Andhakare" into "Aapke Kamre Mein Koi" in Yaadon Ki Baarat (1973), all of these regarded as chartbusters.

Track listing
No.	Title	Singer(s)	Length
1.	"Ki Bolite Ele" (Tobu Bole Keno Sahasai)	Kishore Kumar	3:10
2.	"Gun Gun Gun Kunje Amar"	Asha Bhosle	3:09
3.	"Bondho Dwarer Andhakare"	Kishore Kumar, Asha Bhosle	4:31
4.	"Koto Naari Achhe E Gokule"	Tanuja, Kishore Kumar, Asha Bhosle	2:37
5.	"Ki Je Bhabi Elomelo"	Asha Bhosle	3:22
6.	"E Ki Holo"	Kishore Kumar	3:23
Total length:			20:12
