= Mere Humsafar =

- Poster
- Directed by: Dulal Guha
- Written by: B. R. Ishara (dialogues)
- Screenplay by: Dulal Guha
- Story by: Dulal Guha
- Produced by: Yusuf Teendarwajawala
- Starring: Jeetendra; Sharmila Tagore
- Cinematography: M. Rajaram
- Edited by: R. Tipnis
- Music by: Kalyanji Anandji
- Production company: Labela Films
- Release date: 13 November 1970
- Running time: 153 minutes
- Country: India
- Language: Hindi

Mere Humsafar (transl. My Soulmate) is a 1970 Hindi-language romance film, produced by Yusuf Teendarwajawala under the Labela Films banner and directed by Dulal Guha. It stars Jeetendra and Sharmila Tagore, with music composed by Kalyanji Anandji.

== Cast ==
- Jeetendra as Raju "Junglee"
- Sharmila Tagore as Tarna / Meenakshi
- Balraj Sahni as Ashok
- Laxmi Chhaya as Kusum
- Suresh as Raigiya Dada
- Jagdeep as a Truck cleaner
- Jeevan as Mittal
- Sunder as Shambu Dada
- Ramayan Tiwari as Ustad Anwar
- Keshto Mukherjee as Abdul Narayan D'Souza
- Shammi as Suzie
- Mohan Sherry
- Parkash Thapa as Truck driver
- Gopal Sehgal as a film director

== Soundtrack ==
All the songs were penned by Anand Bakshi, songs were composed by Kalyanji Anandji and Kamal Rajasthani.

#	Title	Singer(s)	Composer	Duration	Raga
1	"Kisi Raah Me, Kisi Mod Par"	Mukesh, Lata Mangeshkar	Kalyanji Anandji	05:20	Charukeshi
2	"Mausam Hai Baharon Ka"	S.Balbir, Mahendra Kapoor	Kamal Rajasthani	05:13	
3	"Mera Pardesi Na Aaya"	Lata Mangeshkar	Kalyanji Anandji	05:11	
4	"Tum Humse Milo"	Lata Mangeshkar	Kalyanji Anandji	04:21	
5	"Haye Mar Gayi"	Asha Bhosle	Kalyanji Anandji	03:45	
