= Dil Kaa Heera =

- Poster
- Directed by: Dulal Guha
- Starring: Dharmendra and Hema Malini
- Release date: 1979
- Country: India
- Language: Hindi

Dil Kaa Heera (transl. Diamond of the heart) is a 1979 Bollywood film directed by Dulal Guha. The film stars Dharmendra and Hema Malini.

== Cast ==
- Dharmendra ...Customs Officer Rajat Sharma
- Hema Malini ...Roopa 'Parirani'
- Sachin ...Kundan Sharma
- Abhi Bhattachary ...Gupta
- Prakash Gill
- Nandita Bose ...Seema Gupta
- Master Sandeep ...Munna (as Master Sundeep)
- Agha ...Manoharlal K. Shah
- Pinchoo Kapoor ...Dinesh Patel
- Brahmachari ...Jai (as Bramchaari)
- Satyen Kappu ...Satyam Malhotra (as Satyen Kapoo)
- Jagdish Raj ...Pilot
- Jatin Khanna
- Sanjana
- Ratna

== Songs ==
Lyrics: Anand Bakshi

1. "Ek Patthar Dil Ko Main Dil De Baithi" - Mohammed Rafi, Lata Mangeshkar
2. "Hanste Hanste Log Lagte Hain Rone" - Asha Bhosle
3. "Hanste Hanste Tu Kyon Lag Gaya Rone" - Asha Bhosle
4. "Mere Sainyaan Ne Bulaaya Singaapur Se" - Lata Mangeshkar
5. "Zindagi Ka Yoon Jubaan Par Naam Aana Chaahiye v1" - Mohammed Rafi, Asha Bhosle, Amit Kumar
6. "Zindagi Ka Yoon Jubaan Par Naam Aana Chaahiye v2" - Mohammed Rafi, Asha Bhosle, Amit Kumar
7. MUSIC BY Laxmikant Pyarelal
