= Naan Yen Pirandhen =

1972 film by M. Krishnan Nair

- Poster
- Directed by: M. Krishnan
- Screenplay by: M. Krishnan
- Story by: Samudrala Sr.
- Produced by: Ashok Brothers
- Starring: M. G. Ramachandran; K. R. Vijaya; Kanchana
- Cinematography: P. Bhaskar Rao
- Edited by: K. Narayanan
- Music by: Shankar–Ganesh
- Production company: Sri Kamakshi Agencies
- Release date: 9 June 1972
- Running time: 160 minutes
- Country: India
- Language: Tamil

Naan Yen Pirandhen (transl. Why was I born?) is a 1972 Indian Tamil-language film directed by M. Krishnan. The film stars M. G. Ramachandran, K. R. Vijaya and Kanchana. It is a remake of the 1953 Telugu film Bratuku Teruvu. The film was released on 9 June 1972 and failed commercially.

== Plot ==
Kannan and Saradha are married and he helps bring up his brother's children. Kannan obtains employment hiding his marriage with Mohanasundaram only for his daughter, paraplegic Radha, to fall in love with him. How he deftly handles the situation without losing his job or affecting the faint-hearted Radha without losing his integrity forms the main story. He manages to resolve all issues and expose his marriage in such a manner that everyone is safe as is his job.

== Cast ==
- M. G. Ramachandran as Kannan
- K. R. Vijaya as Saradha
- Kanchana as Radha
- Nagesh as Sabhabadhi
- Sundarrajan as Mohanasundaram
- Thengai Srinivasan as Bhaskar
- M. N. Nambiar as Rajan
- V. Gopalakrishnan as Shankar
- G. Sakunthala as Mohana
- S. N. Lakshmi as Chinnamma
- Rangammal (uncredited)

== Production ==
Naan Yen Pirandhen is a remake of the 1953 Telugu film Bratuku Teruvu. It was the only film to feature Ramachandran in a family-oriented role. The dialogues were written by Vietnam Veedu Sundaram. Kamal Haasan worked as an assistant dance choreographer under K. Thangappan.

== Soundtrack ==
The music was composed by Shankar–Ganesh. They said they chose to do the film simply because Ramachandran was in it.Their Father-in-law, who was also the producer, G N.Velumani was reluctant to use them as Music Directors ( as he always used MSV) but agreed on the insistence of MGR.

Track listing
| No. | Title | Lyrics | Singer(s) | Length |
|---|---|---|---|---|
| 1. | "Naan Paadum Paadal" | Vaali | T. M. Soundararajan | 3:29 |
| 2. | "Naan Yaen Piranthen" | Vaali | T. M. Soundararajan | 4:09 |
| 3. | "Unathu Vizhiyil" | Pulamaipithan | T. M. Soundararajan, P. Susheela | 3:54 |
| 4. | "Chittirai Solaigale" | Bharathidasan | T. M. Soundararajan | 3:19 |
| 5. | "Thambikku Oru Pattu" | Avinasi Mani | T. M. Soundararajan | 3:36 |
| 6. | "Thalaivazhai Ilai Pottu" | Vaali | S. Janaki, Jikki | 5:08 |
| 7. | "Ennamma Chinna Ponnu" | Vaali | T. M. Soundararajan, P. Susheela | 4:45 |
| Total length: | | | | 28:20 |

== Release ==
Naan Yen Pirandhen was released on 9 June 1972. Randor Guy wrote in The Hindu that the film, in contrast to Bratuku Teruvu, underperformed commercially as it ran only for 10 weeks in theatres.
