= Rakhi Aur Hathkadi =

1972 film by S. M. Sagar

Rakhi Aur Hathkadi is a Hindi film that was released in 1972. It was directed by S. M. Sagar. It stars Ashok Kumar, Asha Parekh in a dual role, Vijay Arora, Danny Denzongpa, Kabir Bedi, and Helen. Music is by R.D. Burman. Lyrics are by Majrooh Sultanpuri. Asha Bhosle sang all seven songs, two of which were duets with Kishore Kumar.

Leading lady Asha Parekh said that she dabbled in choreographing the dance sequences "to a certain extent" for this film, even though her name is not listed as a choreographer in the opening credits.

== Plot ==
Janki (Asha Parekh) is a temple priest's daughter. When she was a little girl, a man killed her father, kidnapped her and sold her to a brothel. When she grows up, she refuses to be a courtesan and wants a love marriage with a poor man named Ramesh. Noble and compassionate Thakur Virendra Singh (Ashok Kumar) lives a wealthy life-style with his wife, Ratna, but they have no children. Ratna's brother Vikram has designs on Janki and has bought her. Ramesh saves her from being raped, and they get married with the help of Virendra Singh's assistant Munshi. Ratna has a child after 14 years of marriage and it turns out to be a stillborn baby. While she is still unconscious, Janki decides to help by giving up her son Suraj to Virendra Singh. When Ratna wakes up, she is overjoyed to see that she has a son. Virendra Singh is grateful to Janki and promises her that he will raise her son as his own. Janki and her husband leave town and decide to start a new life and have another child- a daughter named Kiran (played by Asha Parekh again). Meanwhile, Virendra Singh and Ratna have a second son Prakash (Vijay Arora). Kiran grows up and is in college, which is where she meets Prakash. Another student Raja (Danny Denzongpa) harasses Kiran, and Prakash stands by her when she complains to the principal about Raja's behavior. Raja gets expelled from school, and Kiran and Prakash fall in love. Janki is a widow who supports Kiran by taking in sewing, and Kiran feels guilty. Mrs. Reen (Helen), a club owner, sees Kiran dance on the stage at her college and offers her a job as a cabaret dancer. She and Prakash have a run-in with Raja at the club, and he vows revenge. Prakash's brother Suraj(Kabir Bedi) falls in love with Munshi's daughter, Shobhna, but Ratna opposes this match as Shobhna is not in the same social and economic standing as her son. Prakash brings Kiran and her mother to his home to introduce them to his mother. Vikram instantly recognizes Janki and tells Ratna that she is a courtesan. Kiran gets upset and runs out, with Prakash following her. Suraj throws Janki out, when Virendra Singh slaps him and tells them the whole truth about how Janki is his real mother. Raja kidnaps Kiran and tries to rape her. Suraj and Prakash fight the goons and save her. However, Suraj kills Raja and is imprisoned. Janki and Kiran visit him in jail. Kiran cries to her brother that instead of rakhi, all she got for him was hathkadi(handcuffs) for her brother. Janki prays to God to help her son. In court, the judge rules that Raja's death was justified and Suraj is released. Janki is very happy. Suraj marries Shobna, and Prakash marries Kiran in a double wedding. Vikram asks for Janki and Munshi's forgiveness, which is granted.

== Reception ==
Asha Parekh candidly said that she backed and distributed the film "thinking it would be a big success, but it could not last even five days at the box office." In her 2017 memoir, she went even further by calling it "my worst film that ever sank like the Titanic."

== Soundtrack ==
Song	Singer
"Achhi Nahin Sanam Dillagi Dil-E-Bekarar Se"	Kishore Kumar, Asha Bhosle
"Tum To Kya Ho Ji, Tum Ho Meri Chhaya"	Kishore Kumar, Asha Bhosle
"Tere Milan Ko Kaise Chalun"	Asha Bhosle
"Jeeye Tumharo Lalna"	Asha Bhosle
"Bahiya Dharke Lipta"	Asha Bhosle
"Aaja Aaja Sajan" - 1	Asha Bhosle
"Aaja Aaja Sajan" - 2	Asha Bhosle
