= Chand Aur Suraj =

1965 film directed by Dulal Guha

Chand aur Suraj
- Theatrical release poster
- Directed by: Dulal Guha
- Screenplay by: Dulal Guha
- Dialogues by: B. R. Ishara
- Story by: Dulal Guha
- Produced by: Dulal Guha
- Starring: Dharmendra; Ashok Kumar; Tanuja; Nirupa Roy
- Cinematography: M. Rajaram
- Edited by: Keshav Nanda
- Music by: Salil Chowdhury
- Production company: Ganga Chitra
- Distributed by: A. K. Nadiadwala
- Release date: 12 August 1965
- Country: India
- Language: Hindi

Chand Aur Suraj (transl. The Moon and the Sun) is a 1965 Indian Hindi-language film produced by Ganga Chitra and directed by Dulal Guha. The film stars Dharmendra, Ashok Kumar, Tanuja, Nirupa Roy and Asit Sen. The film's music is by Salil Chowdhury. The film was remade in Tamil as Annavin Aasai (1966).

== Plot ==
After a disgraced man's accidental death, the lives of his family change drastically when they receive money from his insurance company.

== Cast ==
- Dharmendra as Suraj Malik
- Ashok Kumar as Chander Malik
- Tanuja as Kiran Choudhary (Suraj’s girlfriend, later wife)
- Nirupa Roy as Kamla Malik (Chander’s wife)
- Asit Sen as Dindayal Choudhary

== Music and soundtrack ==
The music of the film was composed by Salil Chowdhury and the lyrics were penned by Shailendra. The song "Baug Mein Kali Khili" was later adapted by Salil Chowdhury into the Malayalam song "Puthan Valakkare" in Chemmeen (1966).

1. "Baag Mein Kali Khili" – Asha Bhosle
2. "Jhanan Jhanan" – Lata Mangeshkar
3. "Kisine Jaadu Kiya" – Mukesh
4. "Meri Aur Unke Preet Puranini" – Asha Bhosle
5. "Teri Yaad" – Lata Mangeshkar
6. "Tumhe Dil Se Chaha" – Mohammed Rafi & Suman Kalyanpur
