= Lover Boy (1985 film) =

- Directed by: Shomu Mukherjee
- Written by: Kader Khan
- Screenplay by: Shomu Mukherjee
- Story by: Shomu Mukherjee
- Produced by: Shomu Mukherjee
- Starring: Rajiv Kapoor; Meenakshi Sheshadri; Anita Raj
- Cinematography: Nando Bhattacharya
- Edited by: Keshav Hirani
- Music by: Bappi Lahiri
- Release date: 13 December 1985
- Country: India
- Language: Hindi

Lover Boy is a 1985 Indian Bollywood film produced and directed by Shomu Mukherjee. It stars Rajiv Kapoor in a double role, along with Meenakshi Sheshadri, Anita Raj in pivotal roles.

== Cast ==
- Rajiv Kapoor as Kishan / Kanhaiya (Double Role)
- Meenakshi Sheshadri as Radha
- Anita Raj as Bijli
- Tanuja as Malti
- Navin Nischol as Prakash
- Kader Khan as Sundarlal
- Om Shivpuri as Rai Sahib
- Indira Gandhi as Herself

== Soundtrack ==
Song	Singer
"Kiss Me Kiss Me"	Kishore Kumar, Leena Chandavarkar
"Bahon Mein Leke Mujhe"	Asha Bhosle, Kishore Kumar
"Main Tera Pyar"	Asha Bhosle, Kishore Kumar
"Maa Indira"	Asha Bhosle
"Janam Janam"	Asha Bhosle
"Yaara Yaara"	Asha Bhosle, Amit Kumar
"Aaho Dilruba"	Asha Bhosle, Bappi Lahiri
"Dhokha Dhokha"	S. Janaki, Bappi Lahiri
"Parody"	Anand Raj Anand
