= Bratuku Teruvu =

- Theatrical release poster
- Directed by: P. S. Ramakrishna Rao
- Written by: Samudrala Jr (story / dialogues)
- Produced by: Kovelamudi Bhaskar Rao
- Starring: Akkineni Nageswara Rao; Savitri
- Cinematography: Kamal Ghosh
- Edited by: P. S. Ramakrishna Rao
- Music by: C. R. Subbaraman; Ghantasala
- Production company: Bhaskar Productions
- Release date: 6 February 1953
- Country: India
- Language: Telugu

Bratuku Teruvu (transl. Livelihood) is a 1953 Telugu-language drama film, produced by Kovelamudi Bhaskar Rao under the Bhaskar Productions banner and directed by P. S. Ramakrishna Rao. It stars Akkineni Nageswara Rao and Savitri, with music composed by Ghantasala. The film was also dubbed in Tamil as Bale Raman (1956), remade in Kannada as Badukuva Daari (1966), in Hindi as Jeene Ki Raah (1969) and in Tamil as Naan Yen Pirandhen (1972).

== Cast ==
- Akkineni Nageshwara Rao as Mohan Rao
- Savitri as Meena
- Sriranjani as Lalitha, Mohan's Wife
- S. V. Ranga Rao as Zamindar Balasaheb
- Relangi as Lokabhi Ramaiah
- Suryakantam as Kotamma

== Soundtrack ==
=== Original Track List (Telugu) ===
The Music was composed by Ghantasala and the Lyrics were written by Samudrala Jr. The song Andame Aanandam is an evergreen blockbuster.

Song title	Singers	length
"Andame Aanandam"	Ghantasala	3:10
"Daarithennu Kaanagada"	Jikki	2:12
"Inthe Prapanchamanna"	K. Prasadarao	2:25
"Vachenamma Vachenne"	Udutha Sarojini	2:44
"Chalo Chalo Yenkanna"	Relangi	2:25
"Raadooyi Kanaraadooyi"	P. Leela, A. P. Komala	2:41
"Yedomattu Mandu Jalli"	P. Leela	3:06
"Andame Aanandam"	Ghantasala, P. Leela	3:35

=== Bale Raman (Tamil) Songs ===
The music was composed by T. A. Kalyanam. Lyrics were by Kanaga Surabhi. Playback singers are Ghantasala, A. M. Rajah, P. Seenivasan, P. Leela, Jikki, A. P. Komala & Udutha Sarojini.

All the tunes for all the songs for both languages are the same. The song Engume Aanandham Aanandhame Jeevanin Magarandham is still very popular.

Song title	Singers	Length
"Engume Aanandham"	Ghantasala	03:10
"Thaaye Ninnarul Thaal"	Jikki	02:12
"Pattadhaarigal Vaazhvidhu"	A. M. Rajah	02:25
"Vanthaachammaa Vandhaachu"	Udutha Sarojini	02:44
"Chalo Chalo Chenkannaa"	P. Seenivasan	02:00
"Kaanene Innum Kaanene"	P. Leela & A. P. Komala	02:41
"Sokku Podi Potta"	P. Leela	03:06
"Engume Aanandham"	P. Leela	03:35
"Thaamadham En Endru"	P. Leela	00:53
