= Insaaf (1973 film) =

Insaf
- Directed by: Adurthi Subba Rao
- Starring: Waheeda Rehman; Vijay Arora; Tanuja
- Music by: Laxmikant–Pyarelal
- Release date: 1973
- Country: India
- Language: Hindi

Insaf is a 1973 Bollywood film directed by Adurthi Subba Rao. It stars Waheeda Rehman, Vijay Arora, Tanuja in lead roles.

== Cast ==
- Waheeda Rehman as Janki
- Vijay Arora as Shankar
- Tanuja as Uma
- Aruna Irani as Asha
- Pran as Shekhar / Kanhaiya (Double Role)
- Meena T. as Hema
- Ravindra Kapoor as Raju
- Manmohan Krishna as Judge

== Soundtrack ==
1. "Dil Liya" – Kishore Kumar, Lata Mangeshkar
2. "Mem Shaab Mem Shaab" – Kishore Kumar, Lata Mangeshkar
3. "Maine Pyaar Kiya Main Pachtayi" – Lata Mangeshkar
4. "Mera Naam Mai Tera Naam Tu" – Shailendra Singh, Asha Bhosle
5. "Tu Kathputli Naach Mere Hath teri dor" – Asha Bhosle
