= Sangdil Sanam =

- Poster
- Directed by: Shomu Mukherjee
- Screenplay by: Tanveer Khan
- Story by: Shomu Mukherjee; Anwar Khan
- Produced by: Shomu Mukherjee
- Starring: Salman Khan; Manisha Koirala
- Cinematography: Aloke Dasgupta
- Edited by: Vishwanath Rao
- Music by: Anand-Milind
- Distributed by: Eros International
- Release date: 16 December 1994
- Running time: 156 minutes
- Country: India
- Language: Hindi
- Budget: ₹1 crore
- Box office: ₹1.38 crore

Sangdil Sanam (transl. Merciless sweetheart) is a 1994 Indian Hindi-language film directed by Shomu Mukherjee. It is a remake of Bengali film Tomar Rakte Amar Sohag (1993) directed by Mukherjee's brother Ram Mukherjee.

== Synopsis ==
Kailashnath is the manager of a bank who lives a comfortable life with his wife Savitri and son Kishan. He is friendly with the bank's watchman, Shankar Dayal Khurana, so much so that he arranges the betrothal of Kishan with Shankar's daughter, Sanam. During the engagement, Shankar robs the bank and Kailashnath becomes a suspect. Savitri and Kishan are advised by Shankar to go far away because people were protesting against the family. Kailashnath is arrested, charged, and sentenced to 12 years in prison.

After he completes his sentence Kailashnath returns home to find that Savitri and Kishan are not traceable. He also finds out that he was framed for the bank robbery by none other than Shankar, who is now the Mayor of this town. In the meantime, Kishan, now grown up and the village heartthrob, goes to the city and brings Sanam home with him to be his bride. Sanam, now a spoilt girl who hates poor people, refuses to marry Kishan. Kishan is not aware that Sanam is to be married to Pradeep, the only son of millionaire Lalla.

Lalla and Pradeep are poor but act as millionaires to get money from Sanam's father and they then sell her to a trafficker. Sanam intends to publicly humiliate Kishan on her Engagement Day with Pradeep. But Kishan kidnaps her, with an aim of hurting her pride and go along with making her his wife. Kishan and Sanam stay in a jungle, Sanam escapes and goes to a temple where free food is being distributed to the poor, Kishan arrives and is taking her back when he sees an old man (Kailashnath) not realising that he is his father.

He wishes them to stay happy and together, although Sanam is not happy. Kishan brings Sanam home to his mother as his bride. His mother is very happy and invites the whole village to celebrate. Within the guests is a village girl who likes Kishan and her mother. They get jealous since they brought a bride from the city and didn't marry her. As the guests are talking, Sanam comes out of the room dressed improperly and dances. This causes great shame for Kishan and his mother. After the guests leave Kishan hits Sanam (although she laughs) and leaves her in the rain. In the morning, the village has decided that they want Kishan's wife to leave the village as they don't want their daughters to learn vulgarity from her. Kishan agrees to their demand.

On the other hand, Sanam had been in the rain the whole night and she has a fever. Kishan's mother asks him to help her recover (although he hates her now for destroying his family's reputation in the village) as he is the one who caused this. Kishan has to agree. He takes care of her day and night. Upon seeing this, Sanam recalls their marriage and starts to like Kishan. On the other hand, Kailashnath breaks in Shankar's house with a gun to kill him for betraying him.

Meanwhile, Pradeep enters the house and deals with Kailashnath as Shankar goes to bring his daughter back. When he reaches Kishan's house, he asks the inspector to arrest him, but Sanam tells the inspector that according to the law, she is an adult and can marry whomever she wants, so Kishan should not be arrested. She also threatens her dad as he entered her house without permission. Shankar gets really sad now, but can't do anything. Kishan is happy as Sanam has turned into "Munni" (Sanam's childhood name).

== Cast ==
- Salman Khan as Kishan
- Manisha Koirala as Sanam
- Aloknath as Kailashnath
- Reema Lagoo as Savitri
- Kiran Kumar as Shankar Dayal Khurana
- Raza Murad as Daman / Chamda Dada
- Ashok Saraf as Balchandra
- Shiva Rindani as Sher Khan Pathan
- Anand Balraj as Prince
- Pradeep Rawat as Pradeep
- Avtaar Gill as Pradeep's Father
- Shashi Puri as Police Commissioner
- Kishore Bhanushali as Amar
- Raju Shrestha as Anthony
- Baby Princy as Young Sanam

== Soundtrack ==
The music was scored by Anand–Milind and the lyrics were written by Sameer. The song "One Two Three" was used in the 2014 Bollywood film Haider.

Song	Singer
"Mere Dilbar Diljaani"	S. P. Balasubrahmanyam, Kavita Krishnamurthy
"Sanam Sangdil Sanam"	Kavita Krishnamurthy, Amit Kumar
"Aankhon Mein Bandh Kar Loon"	Amit Kumar, Sadhana Sargam
"Aankhon Mein Band" (Sad)	Amit Kumar
"One Two Three"	Amit Kumar
"Le Le Mera"	Suneeta Rao
