= Prem Adib =

Indian actor (1917–1959)

- Born: Prem Narayan; 10 August 1917; Sultanpur, United Provinces of Agra and Oudh, British India
- Died: 25 December 1959 (aged 42); Bombay, Bombay State, India
- Occupation: Actor
- Years active: 1936–1959
- Spouse: Krishna Kumari (alias Pratima)

Prem Adib (10 August 1917 – 25 December 1959) was an Indian actor. He was acclaimed as one of the top Bollywood actors of the 1940s, along with the likes of Pahari Sanyal, Ashok Kumar, P. C. Barua and Master Vinayak. Adib is best remembered for his roles as Lord Rama in Bharat Milap (1942) and Ram Rajya (1943). These films had him paired with Shobhana Samarth as Sita, and the duo came to be celebrated as an embodiment of chaste love and "traditional Indian values". Adib and Samarth continued as the holy Rama-Sita pair in another Ramayana-based film, Rambaan (1948). From 1943 to 1950, the Adib-Samarth screen pair became popular enough to be featured on covers of religious publications and on thousands of calendars, which would be placed in Hindu temples as objects of worship.

Ram Rajya (1943) also has the distinction of being the only film ever watched by Mahatma Gandhi.

== Early life ==
Prem Narayan Adib was born into a Kashmiri Pandit family of Oudh in 1917. His father Pandit Ram Prasad Adib was a lawyer by profession. The family name Adīb is a courtly Perso-Arabic reference to "learned, scholarly and culturally refined" persons. It had been bestowed on the family as an honorific in the 19th century by Wajid Ali Shah, the last Nawab of Awadh.

Prem Adib married Krishna Kumari Kaul (alias Pratima), a sister of Sheila Kaul. He died aged 42 in Bombay on Christmas Day, 1959. He is survived by a daughter Damini Sohoni and a grandson Ankush Sohoni.

== Lawsuit ==
Adib was involved in a controversy when a minor actress, acting through her father, filed a case against him for breach of contract related to work. The case became known in legal literature as Raj Rani versus Prem Adib. Prem Adib, the defendant, won, as the case was void due to the girl's minority, and also because of which she could not contract her father to sign on her behalf.

== Filmography ==
- Angulimaal (1960)
- Bhakt Raj (1959)
- Samarat Prithviraj Chauvan (1957)
- Neelmani (1957)
- Chandi Pooja (1955)
- Ganga Maiyya (1955)
- Shaheed-e-Azad Bhagat Singh (1954)
- Bhagwat Mahima (1954)
- Maha Puja (1952)
- Mordhwaj (1951)
- Lav Kush (1949)
- Bholi (1949)
- Maa Ka Pyaar (1948)
- Anokhi Ada (1948)
- Rambaan (1948)
- Veerangana (1946)
- Subhadra (1945)
- Chand (1944)
- Amrapali (1944)
- Police (1943)
- Ram Rajya (1942)
- Bharat Milap (1942)
- Chudiyan (1942)
- Station Master (1938)
- Nirala Hindustan (1938)
- Talaq (1938)
