= Kumarsen Samarth =

Indian film director

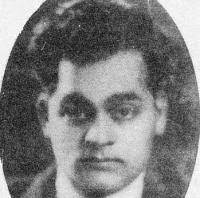
- Born: November 17, 1913
- Died: 15 February 1970 (aged 56)
- Notable work: Shirde Che Saibaba
- Spouse: Shobhana Samarth (m. 1935; sep. 1950)
- Children: 4; incl. Nutan and Tanuja

Kumarsen Samarth (b 17 November 1913 - died 15 February 1970) was an Indian film director. His inclination towards the Marathi language led him to direct some great Marathi/Hindi movies such as Nal Damyanti and Rupaye ki Kahani (1948). His biggest success was the 1955 Marathi film titled Shirdi che Saibaba on the life of the 19th century holyman by the same name. He studied cinematography in Germany and came back to India. He married his distant cousin, Shobhna Samarth, an aspiring actress. They married on the condition that she would be allowed to continue her acting career. They had four children, including the famous film actresses Nutan and Tanuja. He and his wife even made some films together. After fourteen years of marriage, Kumarsen and Shobhana separated amicably but never divorced. After their separation, Shobhana lived with film actor Motilal. Kumarsen died at the age of 56. He belonged to a Marathi CKP family.

== Filmography ==
- Nal Damyanti (1945)
- Rupaye ki Kahani (1948)
- Shirdi che Saibaba (1955)
