= Shomu Mukherjee =

Indian Bengali director, writer, and producer (1943–2008)

- Born: 19 June 1943; Jamshedpur, British India
- Died: 10 April 2008 (aged 64); Mumbai, Maharashtra, India
- Occupations: Director; writer; producer
- Spouse: Tanuja (m. 1973)
- Children: 2 (Kajol and Tanisha)
- Parent: Sashadhar Mukherjee
- Family: Mukherji family; Ganguly family

Shomu Mukherjee (also spelt Shomu Mukherji; 19 June 1943 – 10 April 2008) was an Indian film director, writer and producer. He belonged to the cinematically profiled Mukherji family and Ganguly family. Mukherji was married to actress Tanuja Samarth and was the father of film actresses Kajol and Tanisha Mukherjee. Actor Ajay Devgn was his son-in-law through Kajol.

== Filmography ==
Year	Film	Director	Story Writer	Producer
1972	Ek Bar Mooskura Do	Ram Mukherjee	Yes	Yes
1973	Nanha Shikari	Yes	Yes	Yes
1978	Chhailla Babu	Joy Mukherjee	Yes	Yes
1981	Fiffty Fiffty	Yes	Yes	Yes
1985	Lover Boy	Yes	Yes	Yes
1990	Pathar Ke Insan	Yes	Yes	Yes
1994	Sangdil Sanam	Yes	Yes	Yes
