= Dulal Guha =

Indian film director (1928–2001)

Dulal Guha (1929–2001) was an Indian film director of Bollywood films in the 1960s and '70s. He was born in Barisal city. His father Ruhini Guha died when he was one month old after which he was cared for by his uncle Harendra Lal Guha. He directed many films with Dharmendra as hero and was instrumental in giving Dharmendra his 'Garam-Dharam' image through the blockbuster film Pratigya (1975).

== Filmography ==
- Ek Gaon Ki Kahani (1957)
- Chand Aur Suraj
- Izzat (1968 film)
- Jyoti (1969)
- Dharti Kahe Pukarke (1969)
- Mere Humsafar (1970)
- Dushman (1972)
- Dost (1974)
- Pratigya (1975)
- Do Anjaane (1976)
- Khaan Dost (1976)
- Dil Kaa Heera (1979)
- Dhuan (1981)
- Do Dishayen (1982)
- Mera Karam Mera Dharam (1987)
- Sagar Sangam (1988)
