= Bharat Milap =

- Theatrical release poster
- Directed by: Vijay Bhatt
- Written by: Vishnupant Aundhkar
- Produced by: Prakash
- Starring: Shahu Modak; Ratnamala; Prem Adib; Shahu Modak; Durga Khote
- Cinematography: Purshotam Kukade
- Release date: 1942
- Country: India
- Languages: Hindi; Marathi

Bharat Milap (lit. 'The Reunion of Bharat') is a Bollywood film based on Ramayana. It was released in 1942. It is Ramayana from Bharata's point of view and is about the brotherhood of Lord Rama and Bharata. The film was simultaneously shot and released in Marathi as Bharat Bhet.

Ram Rajya (Hindi version)

== Plot ==
The film opens in Ayodhya, where preparations are made for the coronation of Prince Rama, the eldest son of King Dasharatha. Meanwhile, Rama's younger brother Bharat is away in the kingdom of Kekaya. Queen Kaikeyi's maid Manthara gradually turns her against Rama's impending coronation and reminds her of the two boons previously promised to her by Dasharatha.

Kaikeyi demands that Bharat be crowned king of Ayodhya and that Rama be exiled to the forest for fourteen years. Dasharatha is devastated by her demands but is bound by his promise. Rama accepts the exile in order to uphold his father's word and leaves Ayodhya accompanied by his wife Sita and brother Lakshmana. Soon after Rama's departure, Dasharatha dies from grief. Bharat returns to Ayodhya and learns what has happened. Rejecting the throne and condemning Kaikeyi's actions, he sets out with the royal family, Guru Vashishtha and the people of Ayodhya to find Rama and bring him back. At Shringverpur, Nishadraj initially suspects that Bharat has come to harm Rama, but soon learns of Bharat's true intentions. Bharat eventually meets Rama in the forest and pleads with him to return to Ayodhya and assume the throne. Rama, however, refuses to break their father's promise and insists on completing the fourteen-year exile. Bharat accepts Rama's decision and takes his sandals back to Ayodhya, placing them on the throne as a symbol of Rama's rightful rule. He vows to govern only as Rama's representative and await his return.

The story thus centres on the relationship between Rama and Bharat, portraying Bharat's rejection of the throne and his devotion to his elder brother as the central conflict of the film.

== Cast ==
- Shahu Modak as Bharat
- Ratnamala as Mandavi
- Prem Adib as Rama
- Shobhna Samarth as Sita
- Durga Khote as Kaikeyi
- Nilbhalkar as Dasharatha
- Vimal Vasishta as Manthara
- Umakant Desai as Lakshmana
- Prem Kumari as Urmila
- Shantabai Kothare as Kausalya
- K. B. Athavale as Raj Jyotishi
- Amirbai Karnataki as Ketaki Pal
- Pandey as Vasishtha
- Indumati Pathak as Sumitra
- Vipin Seth as Shatrughna

== Reception ==
It was a commercial success and a successful silver jubilee hit. The film was made as a Hindi–Marathi bilingual, with the Marathi version titled Bharat Bhet. ts Bombay premiere was held at Majestic Cinema and was attended by Dr. Sarvepalli Radhakrishnan, while its Calcutta premiere was inaugurated by Dr. B. C. Roy.

The film also received recognition in Calcutta. It was reportedly awarded a gold medal there, with Kanhaiyalal Munshi present at the ceremony. At the 6th Bengal Film Journalists' Association Awards, which honoured films released in 1942, This film was listed among the contenders for Best Indian Film, while Durga Khote received the award for Best Supporting Actress for her performance in the film.

== Remakes ==
It was remade into two movies in the same year 1965, by Babubhai Mistry starring Sohrab Modi, Sulochana, Ashish Kumar, as well as Shree Ram Bharat Milan in Color by Manibhai Vyas, starring Prithviraj Kapoor, Mahipal, Anita Guha, Nirupa Roy, Raj Kumar, and Sulochana.
