= Tanuja =

Indian film actress (born 1943)

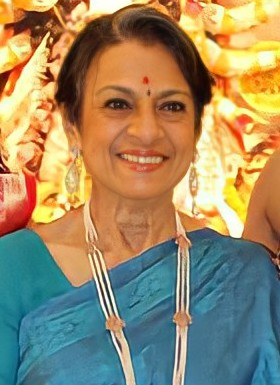
- Tanuja in 2021
- Born: 23 September 1943 (age 83); Bombay, Bombay Presidency, British India (now Mumbai, Maharashtra, India)
- Occupation: Actress
- Years active: 1950–present
- Spouse: Shomu Mukherjee (m. 1973; died 2008)
- Children: 2 (Kajol and Tanishaa)
- Parents: Kumarsen Samarth (father); Shobhna Samarth (mother)
- Family: Mukherjee-Samarth family

Tanuja Mukherjee (née Samarth; born 23 September 1943), known mononymously as Tanuja (Hindi: [ˈt̪ənʊdʒə]), is an Indian actress who predominantly works in the Hindi film industry along with few films in Bengali and Marathi languages and one film each in Telugu, Malayalam, Gujarati, Punjabi and Bhojpuri languages. Part of the Mukherjee-Samarth family, she is the daughter of actress Shobhna Samarth and producer Kumarsen Samarth, younger sister of actress Nutan and was married to filmmaker Shomu Mukherjee, with whom she has two daughters, actresses Kajol and Tanishaa. The recipient of a Filmfare Award, Tanuja is best known for her roles in the Hindi films like Memdidi (1961), Chand Aur Suraj (1965), Baharen Phir Bhi Aayengi (1966), Jewel Thief (1967), Nai Roshni (1967), Jeene Ki Raah (1969), Haathi Mere Saathi (1971), Anubhav (1971), Mere Jeevan Saathi (1972), Do Chor (1972) as well as in Bengali films like Deya Neya (1963), Antony Firingee (1967), Teen Bhubaner Pare (1969), Pratham Kadam Phool (1970), Rajkumari (1970). Her pairings with actors Dharmendra, Rajesh Khanna, Uttam Kumar and Sanjeev Kumar were popular in the late 1960s and early 1970s.

== Personal life ==
Tanuja was born on 23 September 1943 in a Marathi family to filmmaker Kumarsen Samarth and actress Shobhna Samarth. She has three sisters, including actress Nutan and one brother. Her grandmother, Rattan Bai, and cousin Nalini Jaywant were also actresses. Tanuja's parents parted amicably while she was still a child, and Shobhna became linked to actor Motilal. Shobhna produced debut films for Tanuja and her older sister, Nutan. Her two other sisters are; Chatura, an artist, and Reshma, and her brother is Jaideep, none of whom took to acting.

Tanuja married filmmaker Shomu Mukherjee in 1973. The couple has two daughters, actresses Kajol and Tanishaa. Kajol is married to actor Ajay Devgan. Shomu died on 10 April 2008 from a heart attack, aged 64. Filmmakers Joy, Deb and Ram are her brothers-in-law. She is the aunt of actors Mohnish Behl, Rani, and Sharbani, and director Ayan Mukherjee.

== Career ==
She started her film career with her older sister Nutan in Hamari Beti (1950) as Baby Tanuja. As an adult, she debuted in the film Chhabili (1960) which was directed by her mother, and had her sister Nutan, in the lead. The film that truly marked her transition to adult heroine was Hamari Yaad Aayegi (1961), directed by Kidar Sharma, who had earlier discovered Raj Kapoor, Madhubala and Geeta Bali.

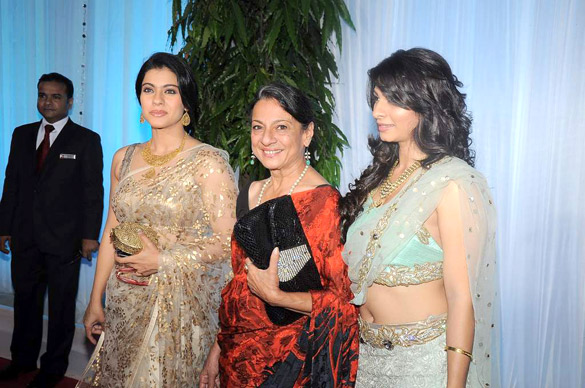
Tanuja with her elder daughter Kajol (left) and younger daughter Tanishaa (right) at Esha Deol's wedding reception in 2012.

One of her early films noted for her acting was Baharen Phir Bhi Aayengi (1966), directed by Shaheed Latif. Incidentally, it was Guru Dutt team's last offering, especially visible in the song "Woh Hanske Mile Humse" (believed to have been picturised while Guru Dutt was still alive) who worked hard to help her "tone down" her performance. The result was that the natural, spontaneous performer gave a highly restrained performance, which became the highlight of the film — as well of her career — as she moved to lead roles soon after. Tanuja received her first nomination for the Filmfare Award for Best Supporting Actress for her performance in the spy film Jewel Thief (1967). Her next film was Izzat (1968) with Dharmendra. This was followed by a film with Jeetendra; Jeene Ki Raah (1969), an immediate and surprise hit. In the same year, she won the Filmfare Award for Best Supporting Actress for Paisa Ya Pyaar. After the success of Haathi Mere Saathi (1971), she acted in Door Ka Raahi, Mere Jeevan Saathi, Do Chor and Ek Baar Mooskura Do (1972), Kaam Chor, Yaarana, Khuddar, and Masoom. Some of the other films she has acted in are Pavitra Paapi, Bhoot Bangla, and Anubhav. Some of her Marathi films are Zaakol, Unad Maina and Pitruroon.

During the mid-1960s, Tanuja started a parallel career in Bengali movies in Kolkata, starting with Deya Neya (1963), where she was paired opposite Uttam Kumar. She followed it up with Antony Firingee (1967) and Rajkumari (1970). Tanuja had on-screen chemistry with Soumitra Chatterjee, with whom she made some films such as Teen Bhubaner Paare (1969) and Prothom Kadam Phool. Tanuja spoke her own lines in these Bengali films.

Afterwards, Tanuja retired from films for a number of years, but came back when her marriage ended. She was now offered supporting roles often starring former heroes. Her Pyar Ki Kahani hero Amitabh Bachchan had to call her "bhabhi" (sister-in-law) in Khud-Daar (1982). She also played a supporting role in Raj Kapoor's Prem Rog (1982). In 1986, she received an invitation from Sri Lanka to appear in the Sinhalese film Peralikarayo opposite to Vijaya Kumaratunga where she played the main role.

She then appeared in films such as Saathiya (2002), Rules: Pyaar Ka Superhit Formula (2003), and Khakee (2003) as a supporting actress. In 2008, Tanuja starred as a judge along with her daughter, Kajol, and son-in-law, Ajay Devgan on Zee TV's family dance series Rock-N-Roll Family. In 2013, Tanuja played a widow in the Marathi film Pitruroon made by Nitish Bharadwaj. For her role as a widow, Tanuja has tonsured her head to make her character look authentic.

== Awards and nominations ==
- 1964 - Bengal Film Journalists Association Award for Best Supporting Actress (Hindi), Benazir (1964)
- 1968 - Nominated - Filmfare Award for Best Supporting Actress for Jewel Thief
- 1970 - Filmfare Award for Best Supporting Actress for Paisa Ya Pyaar
- 1981 - Nominated - Filmfare Awards East for Best Actress for Adalat o Ekti Meye
- 2013 - Best Actress Award for Marathi Movie Pitruroon at the 20th Life OK Screen Awards
- 2014 - Lifetime Achievement Honour at Apsara Film & Television Producers Guild Award
- 2014 - Filmfare Lifetime Achievement Award

== Filmography ==
Year	Title	Role	Language	Notes
1950	Hamari Beti		Hindi	
1952	Amber		Hindi	
1960	Chhabili		Hindi	Debut As Lead Actress
1961	Hamari Yaad Aayegi	Manorama	Hindi	
1961	Mem-Didi		Hindi	
1963	Deya Neya		Bengali	
1963	Aaj Aur Kal		Hindi	
1964	Benazir	Shahida	Hindi	
1965	Chand Aur Suraj		Hindi	
1965	Nai Umar Ki Nai Fasal		Hindi	
1965	Bhoot Bungla		Hindi	
1966	Daadi Maa		Hindi	
1966	Baharen Phir Bhi Aayengi		Hindi	
1966	Sannata		Hindi	
1967	Nai Roshni		Hindi	
1967	Jewel Thief		Hindi	
1967	Anthony Firingee		Bengali	
1967	Dushtu Projapoti		Bengali	
1967	Wahan Ke Log		Hindi	
1968	Sapnon Ka Saudagar		Hindi	
1968	Juaari		Hindi	
1968	Do Dooni Chaar		Hindi	
1968	Izzat		Hindi	
1969	Ek Masoom		Hindi	
1969	Jiyo Aur Jeene Do		Hindi	
1969	Teen Bhubaner Pare		Bengali	
1969	Oos Raat Ke Baad		Hindi	
1969	Paisa Ya Pyar		Hindi	
1969	Jeene Ki Raah		Hindi	
1969	Gustakhi Maaf		Hindi	
1969	Pita Putra		Bengali	
1970	Pavitra Paapi		Hindi	
1970	Priya		Hindi	
1970	Pratham Kadam Phool		Bengali	
1970	Rajkumari		Bengali	
1970	Bachpan		Hindi	
1971	Pyar Ki Kahani		Hindi	
1971	Preet Ki Dori		Hindi	
1971	Haathi Mere Saathi		Hindi	
1971	Ek Paheli		Hindi	
1971	Door Ka Raahi		Hindi	
1971	Anubhav		Hindi	
1971	Purani Pehchaan		Hindi	
1972	Mome Ki Gudiya		Hindi	
1972	Mere Jeevan Saathi		Hindi	
1972	Ek Baar Muskura Do		Hindi	
1972	Do Chor		Hindi	
1972	Aparna		Bengali	
1972	Chaitali		Bengali	
1973	Insaaf		Hindi	
1973	Nanha Shikari		Hindi	
1974	Imtihan		Hindi	
1974	Humshakal		Hindi	
1974	Amir Garib		Hindi	
1974	Hamrahi		Hindi	
1975	Aaja Sanam		Hindi	
1976	Malavpati Munj		Gujarati	
1977	Simana Periye		Bengali	Bangladeshi Bengali Film
1978	Swarag Narak		Hindi	
1978	Lalkuthi		Bengali	
1978	Nari Tu Narayani		Hindi	
1980	Thaliritta Kinakkal		Malayalam	
1980	Bandish		Hindi	
1980	Zaakol		Marathi	
1981	Yaarana		Hindi	
1981	Commander		Hindi	
1981	Adalat o Ekti Meye		Bengali	
1982	Pyaas		Hindi	
1982	Prem Rog		Hindi	
1982	Khud-Daar		Hindi	
1982	Kaamchor		Hindi	
1982	Ucha Dar Babe Nanak Da		Punjabi	
1982	Johny I Love You		Hindi	
1982	Rustom		Hindi	
1982	Sugandh		Hindi	
1982	Bahu Ho Toh Aisi		Hindi	
1983	Masoom		Hindi	
1983	Ek Jaan Hain Hum		Hindi	
1983	Lovers		Hindi	
1983	Hamar Bhauji		Bhojpuri	
1983	Chena Achena		Bengali	
1984	Yaadgaar		Hindi	
1984	Pet Pyar Aur Paap		Hindi	
1984	Maati Maangey Khoon		Hindi	
1984	Boxer		Hindi	
1984	Shilalipi		Bengali	
1984	Gulchhadi		Marathi	
1984	Kunwari Bahu		Hindi	
1984	Sohni Mahiwal		Hindi	
1985	Lover Boy		Hindi	
1985	Hoshiyar		Hindi	
1985	Zabardast		Hindi	
1985	Ghar Dwaar		Hindi	
1986	Suhaagan		Hindi	
1986	Nasihat		Hindi	
1986	Mohabbat Ki Kasam		Hindi	
1986	Maa Beti		Hindi	
1986	Love 86		Hindi	
1986	Jaal		Hindi	
1986	Ek Main Aur Ek Tu		Hindi	
1986	Anokha Rishta		Hindi	
1986	Adhikar		Hindi	
1986	Ek Aur Sikander		Hindi	
1986	Peralikarayo		Sinhala	
1987	Mard Ki Zabaan		Hindi	
1987	Diljalaa		Hindi	
1987	Meraa Suhaag		Hindi	
1988	Paap Ko Jalaa Kar Raakh Kar Doonga		Hindi	
1988	Mera Muqaddar		Hindi	
1988	Madhuban		Hindi	
1988	Agnee		Hindi	
1988	Aagoon		Bengali	Bengali film
1988	Unad Maina		Marathi	
1989	Taaqatwar		Hindi	
1989	Rakhwala		Hindi	
1989	Paraya Ghar		Hindi	
1989	Meri Zabaan		Hindi	
1989	Gharana		Hindi	
1989	Gawaahi		Hindi	
1990	Shandaar		Hindi	
1990	Dushman		Hindi	
1990	Andha Bichar		Bengali	
1992	Gajab Tamaasa		Hindi	
1992	Abhi Abhi		Hindi	
1992	Deedar		Hindi	
1992	Bekhudi		Hindi	
1993	Paruvu Prathista		Telugu	
1993	Izzat Ki Roti		Hindi	
1993	Antim Nyay		Hindi	
1994	Aatish		Hindi	
1996	Muqadama		Hindi	
1998	Paradesi		Bengali	
1999	Safari		Hindi	
2002	Tum Jiyo Hazaron Saal	Dr. Mukta Kohli	Hindi	
2002	Saathiya		Hindi	
2003	Rules: Pyaar Ka Superhit Formula		Hindi	
2003	Bhoot		Hindi	
2004	Khakee		Hindi	
2004	Deewaar		Hindi	
2010	Toonpur Ka Superrhero		Hindi	
2012	Son of Sardaar		Hindi	
2013	Pitruroon		Marathi	Marathi film
2016	A Death in the Gunj		English/Hindi	
2018	Shonar Pahar		Bengali	
2022	Modern Love: Mumbai		Hindi	Anthology web series

== Television ==
- Khandaan (1985)
- Junoon (1994)
- Aarambh (2017)
