= Ram Rajya (1943 film) =

- Ram Rajya
- Directed by: Vijay Bhatt
- Story by: Kanu Desai
- Based on: Ramayana by Valmiki
- Starring: Prem Adib; Shobhna Samarth
- Music by: Shankarrao Vyas
- Release date: 1943
- Running time: 132 min
- Country: India
- Languages: Hindi; Marathi

Ram Rajya (lit. 'Kingdom of Rama') is a 1943 Hindi film, directed by Vijay Bhatt, with Prem Adib and Shobhna Samarth in the lead roles of Rama And Sita. It was the third highest grossing Indian film of 1943.

Ram Rajya (Hindi version)

The film gained significance, as for title it used the term Ram Rajya (Rule of Rama), Mahatma Gandhi often used to define democratic-righteous rule during the Indian independence struggle, and it was the only film he, who did not think much of the medium, ever saw. It was the first Indian movie that premiered in the USA.

== Plot ==
Following Bhagwan Shri Ram's 14-year exile, whereby he demolishes the evil empire of Lord Ravan, rescues his wife, Sita, and returns triumphantly home to Ayodhya to be crowned the King. Bhagwan Ram arranges for Sita to be placed on top a funeral pyre, and when she comes out unscathed with the Lord of Fire himself appearing and asking Bhagwan Ram to take Sita back as she is pure, and her presence has not only purified Ayodhya, but also Sri Lanka, as well as himself. Thus satiated, Ram and Sita return to Ayodhya, but not for long as the people, especially a washer-man (Dhobi) demands that Sita be expelled from the kingdom, as the people would like him to ask his wife to leave Ayodhya as she has spent several days and nights away from husband, and has thus maligned herself. Bhagwan Ram gives way to the demands of his people, and expels Sita, who then goes to reside with Lord Valmiki, calls herself Vandevi, and gives birth to twins - Luv and Kush. In the meantime, Valmiki has finished writing the Holy Book Ramayan, and ensures that the twins read and understand this, which they do. Then when Bhagwan Ram announces an Aswamedha Yagna (to expand Ayodhya's boundaries by letting a horse run through different kingdoms, and whosoever stops the horse, challenges Bhagwan Ram and his armies). When Vandevi hears of this, she is shocked as this Yagna can only be performed by a ruler with his wife at his side, is it that Bhagwan Ram is getting married again? Before she could find any answers to this question, she is told that her sons have stopped the horse from Ayodhya - and are ready to do battle with the powerful armies of Ayodhya.

== Cast ==
- Prem Adib as Shri Bhagwan
- Shobhna Samarth as Devi Maa Sita/Vandevi
- Umakant as Laxman
- G. Badri Prasad as Rishi Valmaki
- Chandrakant as Rama
- Yashwant as Luv
- Madhusudan as Kush
- Pande as Rishi Vasistha
- V.D.Pandit as Dhobi
- Amirbai Karnataki as Dhoban
- Shantakumari as Kaushalya
- Ranjana as Chitralekha
- Leela Pawar as Vasanti Sr.
- Baby Tara as Vasanti Jr.
- Bahadur as Horse
- Phanse
- Sitaram
- V. Kanse
- Chotejan
- Athavle
- Bholaram
- Laxman
- Baldev
- Kusum
- Baby Sheela as dancer
- Baby Kamala as Child dancer

== Remakes ==
It was remade into color remake by Vijay Bhatt starring Bina Rai and Kumar Sen and Lav Kush starring Ashim Kumar and Jayshree Gadkar in the same year of 1967. The story was remade again as Lav Kush in 1997 as starring Jeetendra, Jayaprada and Arun Govil.
