= Asha Parekh filmography =

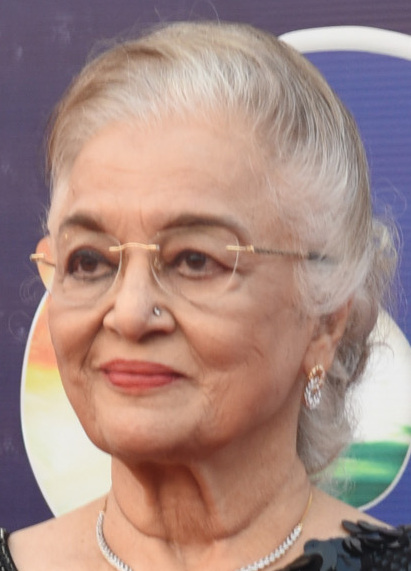
Parekh in 2022

Asha Parekh (born 2 October 1942) is an Indian actress, film director, and producer who has worked in Hindi films. Regarded as one of the finest actresses of Hindi cinema, Parekh has appeared in over 85 films, in a career spanning over 40 years. Parekh has received several accolades including two Filmfare Awards. In 1992, she was honoured with the Padma Shri by the Government of India for her contribution to the field of cinema and was honoured with Dadasaheb Phalke Award in 2020.

Parekh made her acting debut as a child artist with Maa (1952). She made her lead debut with Dil Deke Dekho (1959) and went onto establish herself as a leading actress in the 1960s and 1970 with films including - Jab Pyar Kisi Se Hota Hai (1961), Bharosa (1963), Ziddi (1964), Mere Sanam (1965), Teesri Manzil (1966), Love in Tokyo (1966), Do Badan (1966), Aaye Din Bahar Ke (1966), Upkar (1967), Kanyadaan (1968), Shikar (1968), Aya Sawan Jhoom Ke (1969), Sajan (1969), Chirag (1969), Kati Patang (1970), Aan Milo Sajna (1970), Mera Gaon Mera Desh (1971), Caravan (1971), Samadhi (1972), Heera (1973), Udhar Ka Sindur (1976), Main Tulsi Tere Aangan Ki (1978) and Kaalia (1981).

Parekh won the Filmfare Award for Best Actress for her performance in Kati Patang. In 2002, she was honoured with the Filmfare Lifetime Achievement Award. She released her autobiography "The Hit Girl" in 2017.

== Films ==
Year	Title	Role	Notes	Ref.
1952	Maa	Child artist		
1952	Aasmaan	Child artist		
1953	Shri Chaitanya Mahaprabhu	Child artist		
1954	Dhobi Doctor	Child artist		
1954	Baap Beti	Child artist		
1956	Ayodhyapati	Child artist		
1957	Ustad	Child artist		
1957	Aasha	Asha	Special appearance	
1959	Dil Deke Dekho	Neeta		
1960	Hum Hindustani	Sudha		
1960	Ghunghat	Laxmi		
1961	Jab Pyar Kisi Se Hota Hai	Nisha Singh		
1961	Gharana	Usha Gupta		
1961	Chhaya	Sarita		
1962	Apna Banake Dekho			
1963	Phir Wohi Dil Laya Hoon	Mona		
1963	Meri Surat Teri Ankhen	Kavita		
1963	Bin Badal Barsaat	Sandhya Gupta		
1963	Bharosa	Gomti		
1963	Akhand Saubhagyavati	Usha	Gujarati film	
1964	Ziddi	Asha Singh		
1965	Mere Sanam	Neena Mehra		
1966	Teesri Manzil	Sunita		
1966	Love in Tokyo	Asha/Chizuru		
1966	Do Badan	Asha		
1966	Aaye Din Bahar Ke	Kanchan		
1967	Upkar	Kavita		
1967	Baharon Ke Sapne	Geeta		
1968	Shikar	Kiran		
1968	Kahin Aur Chal	Rajni		
1968	Kanyadaan	Rekha		
1969	Sajan	Rajni		
1969	Pyar Ka Mausam	Seema		
1969	Chirag	Asha Chibbar	Nominated – Filmfare Award for Best Actress	
1969	Aya Sawan Jhoom Ke	Aarti		
1970	Pagla Kahin Ka	Dr. Shalini		
1970	Naya Raasta	Shallo		
1970	Bhai-Bhai	Lajwanti		
1970	Mahal	Roopa		
1970	Aan Milo Sajna	Varsha/ Deepali		
1970	Kankan De Ohle	Nikki	Punjabi film	
1971	Mera Gaon Mera Desh	Anju		
1971	Kati Patang	Madhavi	Won - Filmfare Award for Best Actress	
1971	Jwala	Ranjana		
1971	Jawan Mohabbat	Komal		
1971	Nadaan	Seema		
1971	Caravan	Sunita/Soni		
1972	Rakhi Aur Hathkadi	Janki/Kiran	Double Role	
1972	Samadhi	Champa		
1973	Heera	Asha		
1974	Anjaan Raahen	Geeta		
1975	Rani Aur Lalpari	Kamla		
1975	Zakhmee	Asha		
1976	Udhar Ka Sindur	Shanta	Nominated – Filmfare Award for Best Supporting Actress	
1977	Aadha Din Aadhee Raat	Seeta		
1977	Kulvadhu	Chanda	Gujarati film	
1978	Main Tulsi Tere Aangan Ki	Tulsi Chauhan	Nominated – Filmfare Award for Best Supporting Actress	
1979	Prem Vivah	Neela		
1979	Bin Phere Hum Tere	Jamna		
1980	Sau Din Saas Ke	Sheela		
1980	Guneghaar	Sushma		
1980	Badla Aur Balidan	Gauri		
1980	Lambhadarni	Asha	Punjabi film	
1981	Khel Muqaddar Ka	Asha		
1981	Aakhri Mujra	Shamshad		
1981	Bulundi	Sarla		
1981	Kaalia	Shanti		
1983	Pakhandee			
1984	Dharm Aur Qanoon	Sharda		
1984	Manzil Manzil	Maa		
1985	Lava	Amar's Mother		
1985	Chaar Maharathi	Sharda		
1986	Kismetwala	Asha/Shoba		
1986	Preeti			
1988	Sagar Sangam	Yashoda		
1988	Main Tere Liye	Preeti		
1988	Hum To Chale Pardes	Suman	Guest appearance	
1988	Hamara Khandaan	Sharda		
1989	Hathyar	Maa		
1989	Batwara	Thakurani		
1989	Sharavegada Saradara	Janaki	Kannada film	
1989	Ustaad	Asha		
1991	Insaaf Ka Khoon	Janki		
1991	Raiszaada	Jyothi Singh		
1991	Car Thief	Mrs. Mehra		
1993	Bhagyawan	Savitri		
1993	Professor Ki Padosan	Shobha		
1994	Ghar Ki Izzat	Seeta		
1995	Andolan	Bharati		
1996	Muthibhar Zameen	Rani		
1996	Sar Aankhon Par	Asha	Cameo	

== Television ==
Year	Title	Role	Ref.
1988–1989	Jyoti	Producer	
1989–1990	Palaash Ke Phool	Producer	
1998–1999	Dal Mein Kala Hain	Director	
1998–2002	Kora Kagaz	Director and producer	
2001	Kangan	Director and producer	
2003	Kucchh Pal Saath Tumhara	Producer	
2008	Tyohaar Dhamaaka	Judge	
