= Teen Murti (film) =

1984 Indian film by Pramod Chakravorty

- Theatrical poster of Teen Murti
- Directed by: Pramod Chakravorty
- Screenplay by: Sachin Bhowmick
- Dialogues by: Sachin Bhowmick; Pramod Chakravorty
- Story by: Sachin Bhowmick
- Produced by: Pramod Chakravorty
- Starring: Dharmendra; Mithun Chakraborty; Danny Denzongpa; Zeenat Aman; Shoma Anand; Pran; Amrish Puri; Ranjeet
- Cinematography: V. K. Murthy
- Edited by: Kishan
- Music by: R. D. Burman
- Production company: Pramod Films
- Release dates: 28 September 1984 (Bengali); 26 October 1984 (Hindi)
- Running time: 166 minutes
- Country: India
- Languages: Bengali; Hindi

Teen Murti (in Bengali; transl. The Three Musketeers), also known as Jagir (in Hindi transl. The Estate), is a 1984 Indian bilingual action-adventure film simultaneously shot in Bengali and Hindi-languages, produced and directed by Pramod Chakravorty in his debut in Bengali cinema, under his banner of Pramod Films. The film stars an ensemble cast of Dharmendra, Mithun Chakraborty, Danny Denzongpa, Zeenat Aman, Shoma Anand, Pran, Amrish Puri and Ranjeet. The film plots three friends unfolding the truth of their past wrongs, which involves a hidden treasure and familial secrets.

Written by Sachin Bhowmick, the film was initially planned in 1976 under the title Teen Farishtey in Hindi, with another star cast, while later it got shelved and re-announced in 1983 to be a bilingual film. The film marks Chakravorty's collaborations for the fifth time with Dharmendra, and first with both Mithun Chakraborty and Danny; it also marks Aman, Anand and Ranjeet's cinematic debuts in Bengali cinema. Filming took places in Kolkata and Mumbai, with portions shot in Rajasthan and Madhya Pradesh. Music of the film is composed by R. D. Burman, with lyrics penned by Gauriprasanna Mazumder and Anand Bakshi for the Bengali and Hindi versions respectively. The cinematography and editing were handled by V. K. Murthy and Kishan respectively.

Teen Murti theatrically released on 28 September 1984, coinciding with Durga Puja, while the Hindi version Jagir released on 26 October 1984 on the occasion of Diwali, alongside another Dharmendra starrer Jeene Nahi Doonga. Upon release, the film received positive reviews from critics and was a hit domestically as well as in Soviet Union.

== Plot ==
Pramod Chakravorty's multi-starrer, Jagir is the story of three musketeers - Shankar, Sanga, and Danny, who fight to help the needy and punish the greedy. Many years ago, Maharaj Shoor Veer Singh gets killed by a dacoit Lakhan, when he tries to stop him from robbing his royal locket, which concealed the map to the treasure of Anjangadh. Maharaj's loyal Mangal Singh helps the Maharaj's son escape the evil dacoit Lakhan. An accident causes the Maharaj's son to lose his memory. he gets raised in humble surroundings as Shankar, unaware of the precious locket he wore around his neck. Over the time, Lakhan becomes an industrialist and called himself Thakur Saheb. Despite his wealth, he continues to dream of attaining the treasures of Anjangadh that are guarded by the watchful eyes of Shamsher Bahadur - a falcon . Shankar - the true heir and Seema, Sanga, and Asha, along with Danny, set out to protect the treasures of Anjangadh from falling into the hands of evil.

== Cast ==
- Dharmendra as Shankar
- Mithun Chakraborty as Sanga
- Danny Denzongpa as Danny
- Pran as Mangal Singh
- Zeenat Aman as Seema
- Shoma Anand as Asha
- Beena Banerjee as Monica
- Amrish Puri as Lakhan Singh / Thakur
- Ranjeet as Ranjeet Singh
- Sujit Kumar as Dacoit Vikas Singh
- Praveen Kumar as Django D'Costa
- Iftekhar as IG Praveen Singh
- Kamal Kapoor as Maharaj Shoor Veer Singh
- Bharat Bhushan as Dr. Bakshi
- Priti Sapru as Lily
- Birbal as Bahadur
- Asit Sen as Guard EK Mukerjee
- Ashalata Wabgaonkar as Sudha, Shankar's saviour
- Azaad Irani as Azaad
- Mac Mohan as Mac
- Bob Christo as Bob

== Production ==
=== Development ===
During the making of Sholay in 1974, Ramesh Sippy was planning to adapt The Three Musketeers (1973) in Hindi, with Salim–Javed as the screenwriters. Dharmendra, Sanjeev Kumar and Amitabh Bachchan, the trio of Sholay, was planned to bring back on-screen by him. Despite the lead actors being signed, the film could not be finalized due to Sholay taking extra time.

In November 1976, Pramod Chakravorty undertook the project and launched it as Teen Farishtey, produced by Tarun Guru Dutt under the banner of Koncord International. Dharmendra and Bachchan were approached again, while Rishi Kapoor, Hema Malini and Jaya Bhaduri were offered another pivotal roles. Vinod Khanna replaced Kapoor after he opted out of it. Later, it got delayed after Salim–Javed declined to sign as its screenwriters. In 1979, Sachin Bhowmick decided to take up the story, on Chakravorty's request, and gave it to Tarun Guru Dutt. Then it was titled as Jagir, and Chakravorty himself took over as producer. Bachchan stepped into Dharmendra's role, Rishi Kapoor stepped into the role that was to be earlier done by Bachchan, and Mithun Chakraborty stepped into Khanna's role. The film once again saw delays due to Bachchan's schedule. Uttam Kumar was approached to replace Bachchan later, which also consequented Chakravorty to make the project bilingually in Bengali and Hindi, but it also got stalled due to Kumar's death in 1980. Finally, Dharmendra came back into the film in his original role, Mithun remained in the film and Danny was signed for the role Rishi Kapoor was earlier doing.

== Soundtrack ==
Music of the film is composed by R. D. Burman, marking his third collaboration with Chakravorty after working on Warrant (1975) and Azaad (1978). It is also his collaboration with Dharmendra for the fifteenth time after Chandan Ka Palna (1967), Seeta Aur Geeta (1972), Samadhi (1972), Yaadon Ki Baaraat (1973), Jheel Ke Us Paar (1973), Sholay (1975), Azaad (1978), Phandebaaz (1978), Shalimar (1978), Alibaba Aur 40 Chor (1980), The Burning Train (1980), Qayamat (1983), Sunny (1984) and Jhutha Sach (1984); and with Mithun Chakraborty for the sixth time after Sitara (1980), Kalankini Kankabati (1981), Aamne Samne (1982), Ashanti (1982), Swami Dada (1982) and Boxer (1984).

=== Bengali ===
Lyrics for Teen Murti were penned by Gauriprasanna Mazumder in his fourth collaboration with Burman after working on Rajkumari (1970), Anusandhan (1981) and Aparupa (1982). Each song was chartbuster, especially "Emon Mojar Shohor" sung by Kishore Kumar, gained huge popularity for depicting the cultural environment of Kolkata through its lyrics. The song "Mon Churi Chhara Kaaj Nei" was later reused in the 2025 Bengali film The Academy of Fine Arts, a film also produced by Pramod Films

Track listing
No.	Title	Singer(s)	Length
1.	"Path Hok Bandhur"	Kishore Kumar, Shailendra Singh, Shakti Thakur	6:13
2.	"Mon Churi Chhara Kaaj Nei"	Kishore Kumar, Lata Mangeshkar	6:23
3.	"Notun Se To Notun E"	Kishore Kumar, Asha Bhosle	5:53
4.	"Jaano Jodi E Mon Ki Chay"	Asha Bhosle	5:48
5.	"Emon Mojar Shohor"	Kishore Kumar	5:15
6.	"Bandar Salaam Nao Janab"	R. D. Burman, Asha Bhosle	5:37
Total length:			35:09

=== Hindi ===
The Hindi lyrics in Jagir were penned by Anand Bakshi.

Track listing
No.	Title	Singer(s)	Length
1.	"Hum Dilwale"	Kishore Kumar, Shailendra Singh, Shakti Thakur	4:49
2.	"Chor Tera Naam Hai"	Kishore Kumar, Lata Mangeshkar	4:36
3.	"Naya Naya Hota Hai"	Kishore Kumar, Asha Bhosle	5:42
4.	"Aaj Ki Raat"	Asha Bhosle	5:40
5.	"Shehron Mein Se Shehr"	Kishore Kumar	4:04
6.	"Sabko Salam Karte Hain"	R. D. Burman, Asha Bhosle	5:28
Total length:			30:19

== Box office ==
In the Soviet Union, it was the top-grossing Indian film of 1986, with 38 million admissions at the Soviet box office. This was equivalent to an estimated 19 million Rblss ($28.01 million, ₹353.23 million) in 1986, or $82 million (₹6.087 billion) adjusted for inflation in 2017.
