= Naya Zamana =

- Directed by: Pramod Chakravorty
- Written by: Aghajani Kashmeri; Sachin Bhowmick; Gulshan Nanda
- Produced by: Pramod Chakrovorty
- Starring: Dharmendra; Hema Malini; Ashok Kumar
- Music by: S. D. Burman
- Release date: 7 May 1971
- Country: India
- Language: Hindi

Naya Zamana (transl. 'New era') is a 1971 Indian Hindi-language film produced and directed by Pramod Chakrovorty. (Note: Not to be confused with Naya Zamana (1957 film)) The film stars included Dharmendra, Hema Malini, Ashok Kumar, Mehmood, Pran, Lalita Pawar and Aruna Irani. The music is by S. D. Burman. It was written by Aghajani Kashmeri, who also wrote Love in Tokyo and Ziddi for Pramod Chakravorty. The movie is loosely based on the 1944 Bengali movie Udayer Pathey and 1945 Hindi film Hamrahi, directed by Bimal Roy.

== Plot ==
Anoop is a struggling writer. One day he meets with wealthy and beautiful Seema and both fall in love. When Seema's brother Rajan Choudhury finds out, he is angered and forbids Seema to see Anoop again. On the other hand, Anoop's sister, Rekha, and Rajan's brother-in-law Mahesh have also fallen in love with each other. This angers Rajan even more and he turns Mahesh out of his house. Rajan finds out that Anoop has authored a book called "Naya Zamana", and decides to publish it and sell it under his name. Anoop and Seema find out when the book hits the stalls and is a big hit. Rajan is unapologetic. Rajan then tries to evict the poor people living in small tenements with Anoop and his mother, but Anoop and Seema intervene, and as a result Rajan orders the tenements to be burnt secretly by his henchman Sitaram. Anoop is blamed for the destruction and arrested by the police. Seema's dad, Sachin Choudhury forbids Seema to see Anoop anymore as well as stay away from the poor people's lives. Seema will now have to choose between her lover and her father.

== Cast ==
- Dharmendra as Anoop
- Hema Malini as Seema Choudhury
- Ashok Kumar as Sachin Choudhury
- Mehmood as Mahesh
- Aruna Irani as Rekha
- Lalita Pawar as Anoop's mom
- Pran as Rajendranath Choudhury / Rajan
- Indrani Mukherjee as Asha
- Manmohan as Ashok
- Shabnam as Lilly
- Jankidas as Sitaram
- Dhumal as Dharamdas
- Raj Mehra as IGP Anand Mohan
- V. Gopal as Pandit
- Baby Guddi as Guddi (as Guddi)

== Music ==
All lyrics were written by Anand Bakshi. The song 'Rama Rama Gazab Huyi Gawa Re" was popular on release, reaching 5th on the year's Binaca Geetmala.

1. "Duniyaa O Duniyaa, Teraa Javaab Nahin" - Kishore Kumar
2. "Wah Re Naujawan Aajkal Ke, Rang Roop Apna Badal Ke" - Kishore Kumar
3. "Raamaa Raamaa Gajab Hui Gavaa Re" - Lata Mangeshkar
4. "Naya Zamana Aayega, Kitne Din Yu Dil Tarsenge" - Lata Mangeshkar
5. "Das Gayi Chuhi, Raina Kajrari Mai HaariKya Karu Jaanu Na, O Champa O Chameli" - Lata Mangeshkar
6. "Aaya Mai Laya Chalta Phirta Hotel, Garma Garma Garam Pakode" - Mehmood, Manna Dey
7. "Choro Ko Saare Nazar Aate Hai Chor" - Lata Mangeshkar
