= Barood (1976 film) =

1976 Indian film by Pramod Chakravorty

- Poster
- Directed by: Pramod Chakravorty
- Screenplay by: Sachin Bhowmick
- Based on: The Summertime Killer by Antonio Isasi-Isasmendi
- Produced by: J. C. Bhagat; H. S. Bhattacharya; Jitu Thakar
- Starring: Ashok Kumar; Rishi Kapoor; Shoma Anand; Ajit; Reena Roy
- Cinematography: V. K. Murthy
- Edited by: Narendra Arora
- Music by: S. D. Burman
- Release date: 2 April 1976
- Running time: 140 minutes
- Country: India
- Language: Hindi
- Box office: est. ₹19.32 crore ($23.52 million)

Barood (transl. Gunpowder) is a 1976 Indian Hindi-language action crime film directed by Pramod Chakravorty, with screenplay by Sachin Bhowmick and dialogues by Ahsan Rizvi. It stars Ashok Kumar, Rishi Kapoor, Shoma Anand, Ajit and Reena Roy in leading roles, with Dharmendra and Hema Malini in guest appearances. The film was shot in several foreign locations, including Las Vegas, New York, Paris, Madrid and Geneva.

== Plot ==
Anup Saxena, a young eight-year-old boy lives in Mumbai in a middle class society, with his father Durga Prasad Saxena, who is a Police Inspector in Mumbai Police. He receives a medal for his dedication, honesty for his services, given to the force. Anup's life is suddenly goes dark, when he witnesses four notorious smugglers, Prem, Jagdish, Ratan and Bakshi, assault and kill his father, in broad daylight on Juhu Beach.

He spends the rest of his childhood trying to make money to avenge his father's death. Twelve years later, the boy is now a champion motor cyclist. He, with the help of his pet Labrador Django, seeks revenge. In true Hollywood style, he begins to track down and eliminate the gang of smugglers.

His search leads him to various places like Las Vegas, New York, Geneva, Madrid, Paris, Barcelona, and the coastal areas of Spain. Where he finds his life threatened by his father's murderers. He kills them one by one in different countries like Prem in Geneva, Ratan in Las Vegas and Jagdish in New York. He leaves his dog at a kennel with Harry Ramani, a vet. He tries to woo Sapna, who is an assistant of Bakshi, in order to get his details and kill him. Bakshi is shot by him, but survives and Anup is already followed by a New York-based retired police detective Balraj Gupta, who is a friend of his late father and is determined to save him. He shadows his every move and will not hesitate to arrest him. Gupta and Bakshi, the Mafia Lord are hell bent to track him. Bakshi is into wine manufacturing and is operating out of Madrid and has a beautiful daughter Seema. Anup starts falling for her and then kidnaps her and takes her to an island and tells Bakshi to follow his instructions.

Bakshi's cronies give anup a wild car chase and finally Bakshi tries to follow him and dies in a car crash. Gupta arrests Anup and takes him to the police but in the middle of the trip he uncuffs and releases him. Seema wants to go with him. But he leaves her stranded in the middle and hands himself over to the police. After his release from the jail, Gupta comes to receive him and finally they end up together.

== Cast ==
- Rishi Kapoor as Anup D. "Pappu" Saxena
- Reena Roy as Sapna, Bakshi's assistant
- Shoma Anand as Seema Bakshi
- Ashok Kumar as Balraj Gupta, Criminologist
- Ajit Khan as Bakshi
- Prem Chopra as Prem, Bakshi's Madrid associate
- Madan Puri as B. Puri – Bakshi's New York associate
- Sujit Kumar as Ratan – Bakshi's Las Vegas Associate
- Manmohan as Jagdish
- Asrani as Hari Ramchandani / Harry Ramani – Veterinary surgeon
- David as Dominic Francis
- Dr. Shriram Lagoo as Inspector Durgaprasad Saxena - Anup's father
- Dharmendra as Anup's Landlord (Cameo)
- Hema Malini as Anup's Landlady (Cameo)

== Soundtrack ==
Barood

Soundtrack album by S. D. Burman
- Released: April 2, 1976
- Genre: Feature film soundtrack
- Length: 33:11
- Language: Hindi
- Label: Universal Music India
- Producer: S. D. Burman

S. D. Burman chronology
Mili (1975)	Barood (1976)	Arjun Pandit (1976)

The music was composed by S. D. Burman with lyrics written by Anand Bakshi.

Songs
No.	Title	Singer(s)	Length
1.	"Matlab Jo Samjhe"	Kishore Kumar	4:25
2.	"Dil Kanton Mein (Ek Dushman Pe Pyar Aaya Hai)"	Lata Mangeshkar	4:32
3.	"Tu Shaitano Ka Sardar Hai"	Mukesh & Shivangi Kolhapure	3:55
4.	"Samandar Samandar - Instrumental"	S. D. Burman	4:51
5.	"Samandar Samandar"	Lata Mangeshkar	4:26
6.	"I Love You"	Asha Bhosle	4:42
7.	"Tu Shaitano Ka Sardar Hai - Instrumental"	S. D. Burman	5:03
Total length:			33:11

== Box office ==
Barood was a successful venture in India, but an All Time Blockbuster in the Soviet Union, where it released in 1978 and topped the year's Soviet box office chart. The film drew a box office audience of 60 million Soviet viewers, the second highest for an Indian film in the 1970s (after the earlier Rishi Kapoor starrer Bobby) and the fifth highest for a foreign film that decade. At the Soviet box office, it was the 13th biggest hit of the 1970s, the fourth most successful Indian import of all time (after Awaara, Bobby and Disco Dancer), the ninth biggest foreign hit of all time, and one of the top 30 biggest hits of all time.

== See also ==
- List of highest-grossing Indian films
- List of highest-grossing Indian films in overseas markets
- List of Soviet films of the year by ticket sales
