= Agha Jani Kashmiri =

Film screenwriter (1908-1998)

Aghajani Kashmeri
- آغاجانی کشمیری
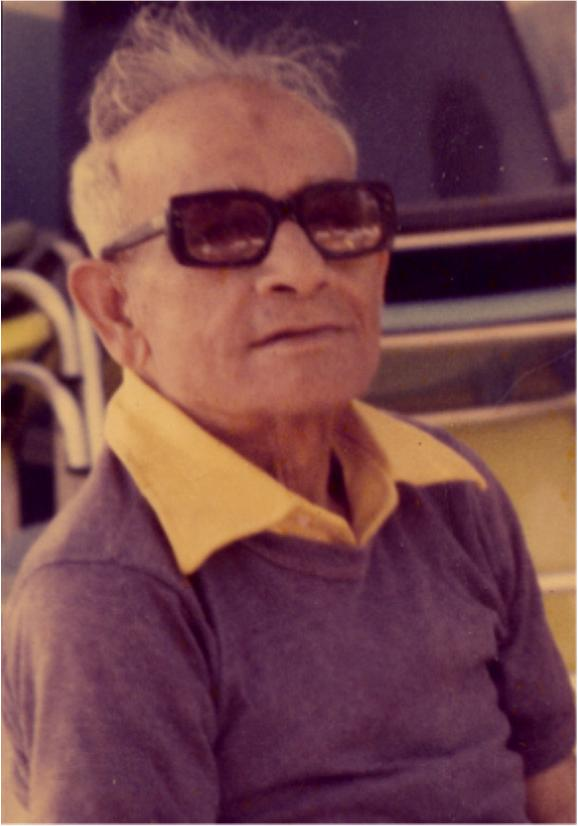
- Born: Syed Wajid Hussain Rizvi; 16 October 1908; Lucknow, Uttar Pradesh, India
- Died: 27 March 1998 (age 89); Toronto, Ontario, Canada
- Occupations: Screenwriter, Urdu poet
- Years active: 1938 – 1976
- Spouse: Khursheed Kashmeri (née Kazi)
- Children: Zuhair Kashmeri and Sarwar Kashmeri

Syed Wajid Hussain Rizvi (Urdu: سيد واجد حسین رضوی, born 16 October 1908 – 27 March 1998), better known by his film screen name, Agha Jani Kashmiri (Urdu: آغاجانی کشمیری), was an Indian screenwriter, former actor and Urdu poet.

He worked in Bollywood films, as a writer for a number of classics, from the first Indian cinematic blockbuster Kismet (1943), to the Palme d'Or nominated Mujhe Jeene Do (1963), to Naya Zamana (1971). He was known for writing his dialogues in literary Urdu, which eventually went out of vogue after Salim–Javed popularized a more colloquial style in the 1970s.

== Early life and acting career ==
Agha Jani Kashmiri was born on 16 October 1908, in Lucknow, Uttar Pradesh, India. He ran away from home in his late teens to star in an early Bollywood film, Shan e Subhan (1933) (variously listed as Shan e Subhan and Shane Subhan). In part, he was inspired by his first cousin, Nawab Kashmiri, also of Lucknow, the best-known character actor in early Indian cinema, with hits such as Yahudi ki Ladki (Daughter of the Jew), in which Nawab played an elderly Jew. Subsequently, Aghajani returned to Calcutta, did some small roles and a few lead roles, two of them opposite Begum Akhtar. Three of the movies he acted in were Miss Manorama and Anokhi Ada and Bhabhi - all three films in the 1930s.

== Screenwriting ==
Given his literary upbringing in Urdu – he was a pupil of the famous Urdu poet Arzoo Lackhnavi and was schooled in Urdu literature – Kashmeri joined the film studio Bombay Talkies, learned screenplay writing with Himansu Rai, and wrote his first movie in the early 1930s. It was directed by German director Franz Osten, who worked in Bombay Talkies at the time. The movie, named Vachan (1938), proved successful and Kashmeri went on to write more than 50 movies.

== Personal life ==
In Bombay (now Mumbai) he and his wife lived with their sons Zuhair Kashmeri and Sarwar Kashmeri. He wrote for Bollywood producer-directors including Subodh Mukherjee, Sashadhar Mukherjee, Sunil Dutt, Mehboob Khan, Himanshu Rai of Bombay Talkies, Franz Osten, Pramod Chakravorty; and actors Ashok Kumar, Veena, Devika Rani, Noor Jehan, Suraiya, Sadhana, Saira Banu, Joy Mukherjee, Shammi Kapoor, Dilip Kumar, Raj Kapoor and Nimmi.

== Death and legacy ==
Agha Jani Kashmiri died on 27 March 1998. His son Zuhair Kashmeri is a journalist in Canada.

== Filmography ==
The following is a partial filmography:

- Naya Zamana (1971) (writer)
- Parwana (1971) (dialogue and screenplay)
- Tumse Achha Kaun Hai (1969) (dialogue)
- Love in Tokyo (1966) (dialogue)
- April Fool (1964) (dialogue)
- Gazal (1964) (writer)
- Ziddi (1964) (dialogue)
- Mujhe Jeene Do (1963) (written by)
- Yeh Rastey Hain Pyar Ke (1963) (written by)
- Junglee (1961) (dialogue)
- Love in Simla (1960) (dialogue) (as Aghajani Kashmiri) (screenplay)
- Chori Chori (1956) (dialogue) (screenplay)
- Amar (1954) (dialogue)
- Aurat (1953) (screenplay) (as Agha J. Kashmiri)
- Malkin (film) (1950s) (screenplay/dialogue)
- Anokhi Ada (1948) (screenplay and dialogue)
- Chandralekha (1948) (dialogue)
- Taqdeer (1943) (screenplay/dialogue)
- Najma (1943) (screenplay/dialogue)
- Anmol Ghadi (1946) (writer)
- Humayun (1945) (writer)
- Lal Haveli (1945) (dialogue)
- Vachan (1938) (screenplay)
