= Shoma Anand =

Indian actress

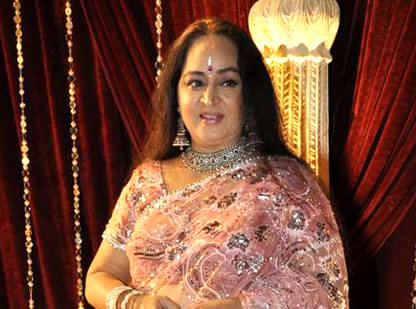
- Shoma Anand in 2012
- Born: 16-02-1958; Amritsar, India
- Years active: 1974−present
- Spouse: Tariq Shah (m. 1997; died 2021)
- Children: 1

Shoma Anand is an Indian film and television actress. She started her career opposite Rishi Kapoor in Pramod Chakraborty's romantic-crime movie Barood, then played a role in Patita, produced and directed by the same person. She had a few other films in which she was the lead, such as Jagir and Coolie in the 1980s. From the late 1990s to present, she has played supporting roles in films like Coolie, Hungama, Kyaa Kool Hai Hum and Kal Ho Naa Ho.

She also acted in television series like Bhabhi, sitcom Hum Paanch and Shararat. She has also worked in Punjabi movies over the years.

She was married to actor Tariq Shah and they have a daughter, Sarah.

== Television ==
- Hum Paanch ... as Bina Mathur
- Maal Hai To Taal Hai
- Kitne Kool Hai Hum
- Bhabhi ... as Reshma
- Shararat ... as Shanti Saberwal
- Maayka ... as Durga Khurana (Jeet & Veer's mother, Soni's mother-in-law)
- Gili Gili Gappa ... as children's Grand mother
- Jeannie Aur Juju ... as Vicky's Mom
- Khelti Hai Zindagi Aankh Micholi ... as Prabha
- Y.A.R.O Ka Tashan as Daadi Cool

== Filmography ==
Year	Title	Role	Language	Notes
1974	Dukh Bhanjan Tera Naam	Rajni's sister	Punjabi	
1976	Barood	Seema Bakshi	Hindi	Debut In Lead Role
1977	Videsh		Hindi	
1978	Azaad	Rekha Sharma	Hindi	
1979	Prem Jaal		Hindi	
1979	Aarattu		Malayalam	
1980	Patita	Rajni	Hindi	
1980	Aap Ke Deewane	Meena	Hindi	
1980	Judaai	Manisha	Hindi	
1981	Balbeero Bhabi		Punjabi	
1981	Kaaran		Hindi	
1981	Khara Khota	Sangeetha	Hindi	
1981	Kasam Bhawani Ki		Hindi	
1982	Jwalaa Dahej Ki		Hindi	
1983	Jeena Hai Pyar Mein		Hindi	
1983	Afsana Do Dil Ka		Hindi	
1983	Himmatwala	Champa	Hindi	
1983	Hum Se Na Jeeta Koi	Sudha	Hindi	
1983	Paanchwin Manzil	Kavita	Hindi	
1983	Coolie	Deepa Iyengar	Hindi	
1983	Main Awara Hoon	Shabana Raashid	Hindi	
1984	Bindiya Chamkegi		Hindi	
1984	Ghar Ek Mandir	Sapna	Hindi	
1984	Hum Do Hamare Do		Hindi	
1984	Jagir	Aasha	Hindi	
1984	Do Yaaron Ki Yaari		Hindi	
1984	Waqt Ki Pukar		Hindi	
1984	All Rounder	Kalyani	Hindi	
1984	Teen Murti		Bengali	
1985	Salma	Mumtaz	Hindi	
1985	Ghar Dwar	Chanda	Hindi	
1985	Pataal Bhairavi		Hindi	
1985	Mehak		Hindi	
1985	Aaj Ka Daur	Sharda Kapoor	Hindi	
1985	Pyar Bina Jag Soona		Hindi	
1986	Qatil Aur Ashiq		Hindi	
1986	Aag Aur Shola	Lakshmi	Hindi	
1986	Swarag Se Sunder		Hindi	
1986	Devar Bhabi		Hindi	
1986	Mohabbat Ki Kasam		Hindi	
1987	Nafrat		Hindi	
1987	Jaago Hua Savera		Hindi	
1987	Ghar Ka Sukh		Hindi	
1987	Sitapur Ki Geeta	Pinky Srivastav	Hindi	
1987	Khooni Mahal	Reena	Hindi	
1987	Pati Paisa Aur Pyar		Hindi	
1987	Maashuka		Hindi	
1988	Saat Bijliyan		Hindi	
1988	Aurat Teri Yehi Kahani		Hindi	
1988	Dariya Dil	Sapna	Hindi	
1988	Pyaar Ka Mandir		Hindi	
1988	Charanon Ki Saugandh	Geeta	Hindi	
1989	Bade Ghar Ki Beti	Manohar's Wife	Hindi	
1989	Jaisi Karni Waisi Bharni	Sapna Kumar	Hindi	
1989	Daata	Alka	Hindi	
1989	Yaari Dosti		Hindi	
1991	Insaaf Ka Khoon		Hindi	
1991	Karz Chukana Hai		Hindi	
1991	Ghar Parivar		Hindi	
1991	Lakhpati		Hindi	
1991	Rin Shodh		Bengali	
1992	Naseeb Wala	Rita	Hindi	
1992	Swarg Se Pyaara Ghar Hamara		Hindi	
1993	Dhartiputra	Meenabai	Hindi	
1994	Professar Ki Padosan	Professor Menka	Hindi	
1994	Dagi		Bengali	
1999	Pyaar Koi Khel Nahin		Hindi	
2002	Shaadi Karke Phas Gaya Yaar	Judge	Hindi	
2003	Hungama	Mrs. Anjali Tiwari	Hindi	
2003	Kal Ho Naa Ho	Lajjo Kapur's Sister	Hindi	
2004	Thoda Tum Badlo Thoda Hum		Hindi	
2005	Kyaa Kool Hai Hum	Dr. Screwwala's Wife	Hindi	
2005	Bhaggmati - The Queen Of Fortunes		Hindi	
2006	Love Ke Chakkar Mein	Kaajal	Hindi	
2009	Life Partner	Mrs. Darshan Manibhai Patel	Hindi	
2010	Lad Geya Pecha	Teej Kaur (Baljit's Mother)	Hindi	
2013	Asa Mee Ashi Tee		Marathi	
2014	Familywala		Hindi	
