= Waqt Ki Pukar =

Waqt Ki Pukar is a 1984 Hindi film starring Raj Kiran, Shoma Anand, Vijayendra Ghatge, Yogeeta Bali, Ranjeet and Madan Puri.

== Soundtrack ==
The music of the film was composed by Bappi Lahiri and lyrics by Gauhar Kanpuri.

| # | Song | Singer |
|---|---|---|
| 1 | "Aale Dulha Raja Baaje Band Baaja" | Asha Bhosle |
| 2 | "Yeh Vaada Pyaar Ka" | Mohammed Rafi, Suman Kalyanpur |
| 3 | "Dillagi Ke Liye Dilruba Chahiye" | Shailendra Singh |
| 4 | "Hamara Naam Na Poochha" | Mahendra Kapoor |
| 5 | "Shu Shu Shuru Ek Naya" | Annette Pinto |
