= Nastik (1983 film) =

1983 action film directed by Pramod Chakravorty

- Theatrical release poster
- Directed by: Pramod Chakravorty
- Written by: Sachin Bhowmick
- Produced by: Vinod Doshi
- Starring: Amitabh Bachchan; Hema Malini; Pran
- Cinematography: V. K. Murthy
- Edited by: Narendra Arora
- Music by: Kalyanji Anandji
- Release date: 18 February 1983
- Running time: 163 minutes
- Country: India
- Language: Hindi
- Budget: ₹25 million
- Box office: ₹76 million

Nastik (transl. Atheist) is a 1983 Indian Hindi-language action drama film produced by Vinod Doshi and directed by Pramod Chakravorty. The film stars Amitabh Bachchan, Hema Malini, Pran, Deven Verma, Sarika, Amjad Khan, Aruna Irani, Madan Puri, Bhagwan Dada, Nalini Jaywant, Rita Bhaduri, Lalita Pawar, Bob Christo, and Tom Alter. The soundtrack was scored and composed by Kalyanji Anandji, and the songs were written by Anand Bakshi. It was the last film to pair Bachchan and Malini before they made a comeback 20 years later in Baghban (2003). The film was a moderate success at the box office.

== Plot ==
Shankar's father, a village temple priest, is murdered by Tiger. His mother and sister are torched in their house. After his father, mother, and sister are killed, Shankar decides to bring justice to himself and goes to the palace of Tiger. Instead of killing Tiger, Shankar blinds him. Shankar blames God for doing nothing and grows up as a Nastik (atheist). Shankar flees to the city and becomes a thief. He joins forces with Balbir and Gauri. At one time, he is shot by Tiger for stealing his goods. In an attempt to hide, he finds his mother, who he thought was dead in the fire. In a rude awakening, he decides to stop stealing and join his long lost family. Incidentally, Balbir saves Shankar's sister Shanti, who is being chased by Tiger's men when she goes outside to bring medicine for her mother. Shankar reunites with his long lost mother and sister. He then decides to finish off Tiger once and for all.

== Cast ==
- Amitabh Bachchan as Shankar
- Hema Malini as Gauri
- Raju Shrestha as adolescent Shankar
- Sarika as Mala (Tiger's sister)
- Pran as Balbir
- Amjad Khan as Tiger
- Kamal Kapoor as Seth Ghanshyamdas
- Nalini Jaywant as Shankar's mother
- Bharat Bhushan as Pujari (Shankar's father)
- Deven Verma as Gayaprasad
- Jayshree T. as Laxmi (Gayaprasad's wife)
- Rita Bhaduri as Shanti (Shankar's sister)
- Viju Khote as Munim Ji
- Lalita Pawar
- Kavita Kiran as Balbir's sister
- Tom Alter as Mr. John
- Madan Puri as Ganga Ram ( Sub Inspector )

== Soundtrack ==
Lyrics: Anand Bakshi

#	Title	Singer(s)
1	"Aaj Ka Ye Din Kal Ban Jaayega"	Kishore Kumar
2	"Dulha Dulhan Ki Jodi"	Kishore Kumar
3	"Sagre Jagat Ka Ek Rakhwala" (Female)	Alka Yagnik, Sadhana Sargam
4	"Main Hoon Tere Saamne"	Asha Bhosle
5	"Pyare Tere Pyar Mein Lut Gaye Hum"	Amit Kumar, Asha Bhosle
6	"Sagre Jagat Ka Ek Rakhwala" (Male)	Mahendra Kapoor, Manhar Udhas
