= 12 O'Clock (film) =

1958 Indian Hindi film

- Poster
- Directed by: Pramod Chakravorty
- Written by: Tanveer Farooq
- Produced by: G. P. Sippy
- Starring: Guru Dutt; Waheeda Rehman
- Cinematography: V. K. Murthy
- Edited by: Vishnu Singh
- Music by: O. P. Nayyar
- Release date: 1958
- Country: India
- Language: Hindi

12 O'Clock is a 1958 Indian neo-noir mystery thriller film starring Guru Dutt, Waheeda Rehman and Rehman. It was produced by G.P. Sippy and directed by Pramod Chakravorty. It was listed in Best Bollywood Noirs of 1950s by Filmfare, citing, "While Guru Dutt is as effective as ever and Waheeda looks suitably grief-stricken and confused, the film belongs to Rehman, who plays Bani's manipulative brother-in-law to perfection."

== Plot ==
At exactly 12:00 noon, two gunshots are fired at the Dadar Railway Station, Bombay. The gunshots kill Maya, the wife of Raimohan. One of the assailants is none other than Maya's sister, Bani Choudhary, and a gun is recovered from her handbag. The second assailant flees on a motorcycle, meets with an accident, and is instantly killed. The police charge Bani with murdering her sister. Faced with overwhelming evidence against Bani, her lawyer boyfriend, Ajay Kumar must race against time to come to the truth behind Maya's murder.

== Cast ==
- Guru Dutt as Ajay Kumar
- Waheeda Rehman as Bani Chaudhary
- Shashikala as Neena
- Rehman as Raimohan
- Johnny Walker as Motilal Sharma 'Moti'
- Sabita Chatterji as Maya
- Ashita Mujumdar as Marina
- Umadevi as Kumari Natesh Sundari
- Amrit Rana
- Abrar Alvi as Police Inspector
- Tanvir
- Rajen Kapoor as Kapoor
- Jagdish Nirulla
- Bhishan Khanna
- Jagdish as Police Inspector Chauhan
- Shankar
- Sitaram
- Govind
- Raj
- Mirajkar
- Sagar
- Hari Sivdasani as Bali's Mamaji
- Helen as Dancer in song "Arey Tauba"

== Soundtrack ==
Songs of the film were penned by Sahir Ludhianvi and Majrooh Sultanpuri while the music was composed by O. P. Nayyar.

Song	Singer(s)	Lyricist
"Saiyan Teri Ankhiyon Mein Dil Kho Gaya..."	Shamshad Begum	Sahir Ludhianvi
"Dekh Idhar Ae Haseena, June Ka Hai Mahina..."	Mohammed Rafi and Geeta Dutt	Sahir Ludhianvi
"Tum Jo Huye Mere Humsafar, Raste Badal Gaye..."	Mohammed Rafi and Geeta Dutt	Majrooh Sultanpuri
"Aji Oh, Suno Toh, Nahin Tumne Humen Pehchaana..."	Geeta Dutt	Majrooh Sultanpuri
"Arey Tauba, Arey Tauba, Yeh Teri Ada..."	Geeta Dutt	Majrooh Sultanpuri
"Kaisa Jaadu Balam Tune Daara..."	Geeta Dutt	Majrooh Sultanpuri
"Main Kho Gaya Yahi Kahin, Jawan Hai Ruth Sama Haseen..."	Mohammed Rafi	Majrooh Sultanpuri
