= Jahan Tum Le Chalo =

- Directed by: Desh Deepak
- Written by: Suraj Saneem
- Produced by: Anil K. Mehta
- Music by: Vishal Bhardwaj
- Release date: 15 January 1999
- Running time: 173 mins
- Country: India
- Language: Hindi

Jahan Tum Le Chalo is a 1999 Indian Hindi language film directed by Desh Deepak. The music was composed by Vishal Bhardwaj and the lyrics were written by Gulzar.

== Plot ==
Shantanu Arya is a glamour photographer and a thorough womanizer. Namrata Shorey is a journalist and is quite amazingly in love with Shantanu even though she knows about his womanising ways. All her requests for marriage fall on deaf ears, as Shantanu consistently avoids commitment of any sort. Slowly she starts getting tired of his wayward ways and starts questioning her own thinking. Suddenly a young, rich man, Akash enters her life and provides her the much-needed respite from her mundane lifestyle. Akash is apparently in love with her. But Namrata reminds him of their age difference and the fact that she has given herself tan aur man se to Shantanu. Meanwhile, sensing the growing proximity of Akash and Namrata and getting rebukes from other girls, Shantanu finally agrees for the marriage. Namrata does a long wait for Shantanu at wedding place but he doesn't reach there till late night and finally as she exits from there, she finds Akash there and at last, she accepts him.

== Cast ==
- Sonali Kulkarni as Namrata Shorey
- Jimmy Sheirgill as Akash
- Nirmal Pandey as Shantanu Arya
- Nirupa Roy as Akash's grandmother
- Subbiraj
- Shail Chaturvedi
- Rana Jung Bahadur
- Dr. Anil K. Mehta
- Ananya Dutta
- Gary Lawyer (Special Appearance)

== Music ==
Jaha Tum Le Chalo

Soundtrack album by Vishal Bharadwaj
- Released: September 21, 1998
- Recorded: 1998
- Length: 45:35
- Language: Hindi
- Label: Milestone Records

Vishal Bharadwaj chronology
Daya (1998)	Jaha Tum Le Chalo (1998)	Hu Tu Tu (1999)

The music soundtrack of Jahan Tum Le Chalo was released on 21 September 1998 by Milestone Records.

All tracks are written by Gulzar.

No.	Title	Artist(s)	Length
1.	"Atthani Si Zindagi"	Hariharan	3:10
2.	"Shauq Khawab Ka"	Lata Mangeshkar	4:04
3.	"Thak Gayee Ho To"	Suresh Wadkar	4:42
4.	"Dekho To Aasman"	Suresh Wadkar	5:48
5.	"Ye Kaisa Chaap"	Rekha Bhardwaj	5:10
6.	"Your Face"	Garry Lawyer	4:10
7.	"Desire"	Rekha Bhardwaj	3:58
8.	"Flights of Passion"	Rahul Vaidya	5:35
9.	"Confusion"	Vishal Bharadwaj	1:44
10.	"Reversal"	Vishal Bharadwaj	2:20
11.	"Oceans of Joy"	Vishal Bharadwaj	1:08
12.	"Fire & Ice"	Vishal Bharadwaj	2:28
13.	"Reflections in the Dark"	Vishal Bharadwaj	1:43
14.	"Temptations"	Vishal Bharadwaj	1:44
15.	"Ray of Hope"	Vishal Bharadwaj	1:07
16.	"Introspection"	Vishal Bharadwaj	1:18
17.	"Freedom of Choice"	Vishal Bharadwaj	0:51
18.	"Untitled"	Vishal Bharadwaj	0:30
Total length:			45:35
