= Charnon Ki Saugandh =

Charanon Ki Saugandh
- Promotional poster
- Directed by: K. Bapaiah
- Written by: Kader Khan (dialogues)
- Screenplay by: Amar Shamji
- Story by: MAlliyam Rajagopal
- Produced by: A. KRishnamurthi
- Starring: Mithun Chakraborty; Amrita Singh
- Cinematography: A. Venkat
- Edited by: Waman Bhonsle, Gurudutt Shirali
- Music by: Laxmikant-Pyarelal
- Production company: Tina Films International
- Release date: 22 April 1988
- Running time: 140 minutes
- Country: India
- Language: Hindi

Charanon Ki Saugandh is a 1988 Indian Hindi-language film directed by K. Bapaiah, starring Mithun Chakraborty, Amrita Singh, Nirupa Roy, Prem Chopra, Kader Khan, Shakti Kapoor, Raj Kiran. The film was a remake of Tamil film Savaale Samali.

== Plot ==
The son of a poor farmer named Govind, Ravi is compelled to serve a landowner named Thakur. The landowner and his son, Shakti Singh, always face a difficult battle from Ravi. Ravi makes the decision to stand up to the wealthy tyrant and his daughter Kanchan Singh during the village elections.

== Cast ==
- Mithun Chakraborty as Ravi
- Amrita Singh as Kanchan Singh
- Rameshwari as Laxmi
- Raj Kiran as Gopal, Laxmi's husband
- Shoma Anand as Geeta
- Nirupa Roy as Malti, Ravi's mother
- Shreeram Lagoo as Govind
- Prem Chopra as Thakur Singh
- Shakti Kapoor as Shakti Singh
- Kader Khan as Chandi Das
- Asrani as Loban
- Sushma Seth as Padma Singh
- Satyendra Kapoor
- Raju Shrestha as Nandu, Chandi's son

== Music ==
1. "Nariyan Shaher Ki Nariyan" – Kishore Kumar, Alka Yagnik
2. "Ek Rawan Ko Ram Ne Maara" – Kishore Kumar
3. "Chal Sair Gulshan Ki Tujh Ko Karaoon" – Kishore Kumar, Alka Yagnik
4. "Chaand Gagan Se Phool Chaman Se" – Mohammed Aziz
5. "Aaja Aaja Mere Mithu Miyan" – Alka Yagnik
