= Nindu Manishi =

1978 Telugu action film directed by S. D. Lal

- Theatrical release poster
- Directed by: S. D. Lal
- Written by: Gollapudi Maruthi Rao (Dialogues)
- Based on: Samaadhi (1972 Hindi film)
- Produced by: N. R. Anuradha Devi
- Starring: Sobhan Babu; Jayachitra; Kaikala Satyanarayana
- Cinematography: Balakrishna
- Edited by: Kotagiri Gopala Rao
- Music by: Sathyam
- Production company: Lakshmi Film Combines
- Release date: 26 January 1978
- Country: India
- Language: Telugu

Nindu Manishi (transl. Complete Human) is an Indian Telugu-language action film directed by S. D. Lal, starring Sobhan Babu, Jayachithra, Kaikala Satyanarayana and Deepa. It is a remake of the Bollywood film Samaadhi. The film was released on 26 January 1978 coinciding with Republic Day.

== Cast ==
- Shoban Babu
- Jayachithra
- Kaikala Satyanarayana
- Deepa

== Soundtrack ==
No.	Title	Lyrics	Singer(s)	Length
1.	"Abba Nee Yabba Theesavura Debba"	Veturi	S. Janaki
2.	"Inthati Sogase Yeduruga Vunte"	C. Narayana Reddy	S. P. Balasubrahmanyam, S. Janaki
3.	"Preminchukundham Yevaremanna"	C. Narayana Reddy	S. P. Balasubrahmanyam, P. Susheela
4.	"Poolai Pooche Ralina Tarale"	C. Narayana Reddy	P. Susheela
5.	"Ramayya Ramayya Raaro Rathiri Yetthakaporo"	Arudra	P. Susheela

== Reception ==
The film was a critical and commercial failure.
