= Pyaar Ka Mandir =

Pyar ka Mandir
- Film poster
- Directed by: K. Bapaiah
- Written by: Kader Khan
- Produced by: Shabnam Kapoor
- Starring: Mithun Chakraborty; Madhavi
- Music by: Laxmikant-Pyarelal
- Release date: 1 April 1988
- Country: India
- Language: Hindi

Pyar Ka Mandir (lit. Temple of Love) is a 1988 Indian Hindi-language drama film directed by K. Bapaiah. The film stars Mithun Chakraborty, Madhavi, Nirupa Roy, Raj Kiran, Shoma Anand, Kader Khan and Aruna Irani. The music was composed by Laxmikant-Pyarelal.

== Synopsis ==
Laxmi Kumar (Nirupa Roy), a widowed school teacher, lives with her three sons, Sanjay, Vijay and Ajay, and daughter, Meena in their family home they call "House of Love". The talented Vijay secretly does manual labor to augment his mom's income, so that his brothers can study IAS and law respectively.

Meena is to be married to a young man named Satish, and Laxmi goes to withdraw her chit fund from Gopal Khaitan, only to find out that he has duped her. The devastated family gather to confront this, only to have their mom lose her teaching job. Vijay swears to apprehend Gopal, a confrontation ensues, and Gopal is killed. In this way Vijay gets the money so that Meena's wedding takes place, while his brothers continue to study. Vijay is arrested, found guilty and sentenced to seven years in prison.

After his discharge, Vijay returns home to find that their family home has been sold. Ajay, who is now the collector, has married Sapna, a very wealthy woman. They have a daughter, Geeta, and are living in a government bungalow; Sanjay is now a lawyer and is living in a palatial home. Both brothers reject Vijay and have nothing to do with him. Devastated he starts driving an auto-rickshaw for a living, hoping that he meets with his mother, who, as he has been told by his brothers, is away on a religious pilgrimage. Vijay does meet his mom, who is working as a common laborer at a construction site, and confronts his brothers. The truth will be revealed as to why Vijay confessed to killing Gopal.

== Cast ==
- Mithun Chakraborty as Vijay Kumar
- Madhavi as Radha
- Raj Kiran as Collector Ajay Kumar
- Sachin as Lawyer Sanjay Kumar
- Shraddha Verma as Meena Kumar, Vijay's Sister
- Shoma Anand as Sapna
- Nirupa Roy as Mrs. Laxmi Kumar
- Satyen Kappu as Mr Kumar Seen in Only Photo in Photoframe (Uncredited)
- Kader Khan as Dr. Bhuleshwarchand Bhuljaanewala
- Aruna Irani as Mrs. Shanti Bhuljaanewala
- Bharat Kapoor as Gopal Seth
- Prema Narayan as Anita Seth
- Shakti Kapoor as Dilip
- Raza Murad as Azam Khan
- Asrani as Patient Khairatilal
- Dhumal as Patient Dharamdas
- Javed Khan Amrohi as Patient Anand
- Viju Khote as Compounder Damodar
- Rajendranath as Astrologer Parmeshwar Shivaramakrishna
- Satish Kaul as Satish, Meena's husband
- Bharat Bhushan as Brij, Satish's father
- Jack Gaud as Shamsher, goon of Dilip
- Vikas Anand as Police Inspector Mohan Saxena

== Music ==
- "Pyar Ke Pahle Kadam Pe" - Kishore Kumar, Alka Yagnik
- "Jhopad Patti Zindabad" - Kishore Kumar
- "Aye Duniya Tujhko Salam" - Kishore Kumar
- "O Meri Jaan Meri Jaan" - Mohammad Aziz, Alka Yagnik
- "Log Jahan Per Rahate Hain" - Mohammad Aziz, Suresh Wadkar, Kavita Krishnamurthy, Udit Narayan
- "Log Jahan Per Rahate Hain" (Sad) - Mohammad Aziz

== Box office ==
The film was a super hit and fifth highest-grossing movie of 1988.
