= Ganga Tere Desh Mein =

- Poster
- Directed by: Vijay
- Written by: Mahipal choudhary
- Produced by: K. C. Bokadia
- Starring: Dharmendra; Jaya Prada; Shatrughan Sinha
- Cinematography: Shyam Rao Shiposkar
- Edited by: Govind Dalwadi; Shyam Mukherjee
- Music by: Laxmikant–Pyarelal
- Production company: B M B Pictures
- Release date: 21 October 1988
- Running time: 153 min
- Country: India
- Language: Hindi

Ganga Tere Desh Mein (transl. Ganga in your country) is a 1988 Bollywood action drama film directed by Vijay Reddy, starring Dharmendra, Shatrughan Sinha and Jaya Prada. The movie is a remake of director's own 1987 Kannada movie Huli Hebbuli.

== Plot ==
Police officer, Ajay, arrests a mentally deranged suspect, Vijay Nath, suffering from memory loss. Ajay's widowed mother treats Vijay with kindness. Inspector Ajay decides to investigate eventually leading up to the true outcome of their actual relation to one another.

== Cast ==
- Dharmendra as Vijay Nath
- Jaya Prada as Dr. Asha
- Shatrughan Sinha as Police Inspector Ajay Nath
- Dimple Kapadia as Princess
- Kader Khan as Sewaram
- Asrani as Mewaram
- Raj Babbar as Police Inspector Amar
- Sudhir Dalvi as Ram Nath
- Kiran Kumar as Kobra/Zalim Singh
- Nirupa Roy as Ajay's Mother

== Soundtrack ==
Lyrics: Anand Bakshi

#	Title	Singer(s)
1	"Tera Mera Saath"	Mohammed Aziz, Anuradha Paudwal
2	"Vadha Hai Vadha Hai"	Anuradha Paudwal
3	"Tip Tip Tip Boond Padi"	Anuradha Paudwal
4	"Yeh Duniya Pagal Khana Hai"	Mohammed Aziz
5	"Ganga Tere Desh Mein"	Kavita Krishnamurthy
