= Chakradhari (1954 film) =

1954 film

Chakradhari is a 1954 Hindi drama film directed by Raman B. Desai starring Nirupa Roy and Trilok Kapoor as lead pair. It was their second collaboration.

== Plot ==
The film deals on the newly passed act of prohibition of polygamy in the new-born state of India in the 1950s.

== Cast ==
- Nirupa Roy
- Trilok Kapoor
- Shahu Modak
- Yashodra KatjuIndira
- Rooplaxmi
- Ram Avtar
- Maya Dass
- Heera Sawant
- Dar Kashmiri

== Soundtrack ==
No.	Title	Singer(s)
1	"Aaj Achanak Rut Key Mujh Se (Bolo He Zamin, Bolo Aasman)"	Mohammed Rafi
2	"O Duniya Ke Malik Ram Teri Marzi"	Hemant Kumar
3	"Chal Re Chal Mere Chak"	Hemant Kumar, Asha Bhosle
4	"Kahe Ko Bisara Harinam Mati Ke Putle"	Mohammed Rafi
5	"Data Tum To De Chuke"	Asha Bhosle
6	"Meri Soyi Re Aatma Jagi"	Hemant Kumar
7	"Aaj Mai Bech Rahi Bhagwaan Hai Koi Lene Wala"	Shamshad Begum
8	"Badal Ki Palaki Pe Ho Ke Sawar"	Asha Bhosle, Hemant Kumar
9	"Raja Ji More Saiyan Ko Karo Jurmana"	Asha Bhosle
10	"Meri Choli Ko Seena Sambhal Ke O Da"	Asha Bhosle
11	"Kya Kuch Bhi Nahin Bhati"	Asha Bhosle
12	"Is Jag Ke Vishal Pinjre Me Lakho Punchi Bhatak"	Pardeep, Asha Bhosle, Mohammed Rafi
13	"O Meri Sas Ke Ladke Dur Hat Re Mera Dil Dahdke"	Asha Bhosle, Mohammed Rafi
