= Hoovu Hannu =

- Directed by: S. V. Rajendra Singh Babu
- Written by: Thriveni
- Screenplay by: S. V. Rajendra Singh Babu
- Based on: Hoovu Hannu by Thriveni
- Produced by: Jai Jagadish; R. Dushyanth Singh
- Starring: Lakshmi; Master Shamili; Ajay Gundu Rao
- Narrated by: N.T. Rama Rao
- Cinematography: V. K. Murthy
- Edited by: Suresh Urs
- Music by: Hamsalekha
- Production company: Sri Tharaka Production
- Distributed by: 20th Century Fox
- Release date: 1993
- Running time: 151 minutes
- Country: India
- Language: Kannada

Hoovu Hannu (transl. Flowers and Fruits) is a 1993 Indian Kannada-language drama film based on the novel by Triveni of the same name. The film stars Lakshmi, Ajay Gundu Rao, Vyjayanthi and Master Shamili. It was directed by Rajendra Singh Babu and produced by Vaibhava Lakshmi Productions. The music and lyrics were written and composed by Hamsalekha. The film was a musical hit and won many awards including the Karnataka State Film Awards and Filmfare Awards South. Veteran cinematographer V. K. Murthy worked in this film and won many accolades for his work. The film failed at box-office.

== Cast ==
- Lakshmi as Ramabai
- Master Shamili as Triveni
- Ajay Gundurao as Kannada lecturer
- Vyjayanti (Bharathi)
- Pramila Joshai as Mother Philomena
- Rekha Das
- Kishori Ballal
- Shankar Ashwath
- Srishailan

== Plot ==
The story revolves around a woman named Ramabai who undergoes pain in every step she takes and is forced in prostitution racket to earn a livelihood. Her grand daughter, Triveni, comes to her rescue in the latter half of the film.

== Production ==
Hoovu Hannu was based on novel of same name by Triveni. V. K. Murthy who worked in Hindi films provided cinematography for the film this being his only Kannada film he had worked. Apart from handling cinematography, he also played a small role in the film as a man who visits Lakshmi's home. Singh Babu being a fan of Murthy wanted him to handle camera for the film. For the scene which required to show ring like shadows, Murthy bought bamboo sticks and uprooted them and let out dazzling light. Rajesh Gundu Rao, son of former Karnataka chief minister R. Gundu Rao made his acting debut with this film as a lead actor portraying the role of a Kannada lecturer, he was credited as Ajay; this film and Samara (1995) being the only two films he appeared in before his death in 2012. Vyjayanthi, daughter of former minister and speaker K. H. Srinivas also made her debut as lead actress with this film. Voice artist Sudharshan Kumar dubbed more than 30 male actors for the film.

== Soundtrack ==
Hamsalekha composed the music for the soundtracks also writing their lyrics. The album consists of seven soundtracks. The song 'Thayi Thayi' was reused in the 2008 Kannada film Vamshi, which also starred Lakshmi after Raghavendra Rajkumar sought permission from Rajendra Singh Babu and Lahari Velu to use the song to which both agreed.

Track listing
No.	Title	Lyrics	Singer(s)	Length
1.	"Manju Manju"	Hamsalekha	Chithra, Rajesh Krishnan	4:20
2.	"Thaayi Thaayi"	Hamsalekha	Chithra, Rajkumar	1:25
3.	"Ningi Ningi"	Hamsalekha	C. Aswath	5:01
4.	"Ramana Paada Poojeya"	Hamsalekha	Chithra	5:41
5.	"Thaayi Thaayi" (female version)	Hamsalekha	Chithra	5:45
6.	"A Aa E Ee"	Hamsalekha	Vijayalakshmi, S. P. Balasubrahmanyam	4:25
Total length:				32:22

== Awards ==
Karnataka State Film Awards 1993-94

- Special Award By Jury – Vaibhava Lakshmi Productions
- Karnataka State Film Award for Best Actress – Lakshmi

41st Filmfare Awards South -1993

- Filmfare Award for Best Director – Kannada
- Filmfare Award for Best Actress – Kannada
