= Deedar (1992 film) =

1992 film by Pramod Chakravorty

- Theatrical release poster
- Directed by: Pramod Chakravorty
- Written by: Sachin Bhowmick; Mir Muneer (dialogue)
- Produced by: Pramod Chakravorty; Lakshmi Chakravorty (associate producer)
- Starring: Akshay Kumar; Karishma Kapoor; Anupam Kher; Laxmikant Berde; Tanuja
- Cinematography: V. K. Murthy
- Edited by: Praful Vyas
- Music by: Anand–Milind
- Release date: 14 August 1992
- Country: India
- Language: Hindi

Deedar (transl. Sight) is a 1992 Hindi romantic action movie directed by Pramod Chakravorty and starring Akshay Kumar, Karishma Kapoor, Anupam Kher, Laxmikant Berde, Tanuja, Gurbachan Singh and Dan Dhanoa. Other cast members include Seema Deo, Ajit Vachhani, Anjana Mumtaz, Rajeev Verma, Priya Arun, Rajesh Puri and Viju Khote. This movie was supposed to be Akshay Kumar's debut movie. However, Saugandh was released first in 1991 thus becoming his debut.

== Plot ==
Anand (Akshay Kumar) and Sapna (Karishma Kapoor) fall in love. In the past, Anand's father had back-stabbed Sapna's dad and he had gone to jail, despite being innocent. Anand plans to free Sapna's dad from prison and requests his dad to confess the truth to the police. What happens next forms the crux of the story.

== Cast ==
- Akshay Kumar as Anand K Malhotra
- Karishma Kapoor as Sapna A Saxena
- Anupam Kher as Arjun Pratap Saxena
- Laxmikant Berde as Mahesh
- Tanuja as Gayetri
- Gurbachan Singh as Goon
- Dan Dhanoa as Chaddha
- Seema Deo as Dr Shanti
- Anjana Mumtaz as Sunanda K Malhotra
- Rajeev Verma as Kailashnath Malhotra
- Priya Arun as Sheela
- Rajesh Puri
- Viju Khote as Inspector Khadak Singh

== Soundtrack ==
#	Title	Singer(s)
1	"Deedar Ho Gaya Mujhko Pyar Ho Gaya"	Udit Narayan
2	"Din Ba Din Mohabbat"	Udit Narayan, Sadhana Sargam
3	"Tera Mera Mera Tera"	Udit Narayan, Sadhana Sargam
4	"Kya Dharti Kya Aasman"	Udit Narayan
5	"Jaanam Mere Jaanam"	Sadhana Sargam
6	"Ab To Kahin Tere Bin"	Udit Narayan, Sadhana Sargam
7	"Hum Apni Mohabbat Ka"	Udit Narayan
