= Azaad (1978 film) =

1978 film

- Directed by: Pramod Chakravorty
- Written by: Sachin Bhowmick; Gulshan Nanda; Ehsan Rizvi
- Produced by: Pramod Chakravorty
- Starring: Dharmendra; Hema Malini; Ajit; Prem Chopra; Keshto Mukherjee
- Cinematography: V. K. Murthy
- Edited by: Narendra Arora
- Music by: Rahul Dev Burman
- Distributed by: Pramod Films
- Release date: 1 September 1978
- Running time: 154 minutes
- Country: India
- Language: Hindi

Azaad is a 1978 Bollywood action thriller film produced and directed by Pramod Chakravorty. The film stars Dharmendra, Hema Malini, Ajit, Prem Chopra and Keshto Mukherjee in lead roles.

Upon release, the film received excellent response from audience and emerged a superhit as well as the fourth highest-grossing film of the year, behind Muqaddar Ka Sikandar, Trishul and Don. At the 26th Filmfare Awards, Keshto Mukherjee got a nomination in the Best Comedian category, the only one for the film.

== Plot ==
This is the story of an eccentric young man, Ashok who believes in doing good without worrying about the consequences. This does not find any favor with his sister-in-law Sarla, and she decides to leave the house. But he persuades her to come back, and he decides to relocate and not cause any more trouble for Sarla. On his way he has a skirmish with the princess Rajkumari Seema who he teaches a lesson to respect the poor and the food grown in the fields.

When Ashok arrives in the city, due to his misfortune, he lands a job at a factory run by the Rajkumari, and immediately gets into the bad books of Prem to whom the Rajkumari is engaged to be married. The Rajkumari also decides to teach him a lesson for the humiliation she suffered at his hands. But things work out differently, and Ashok ends up saving the life of the Rajkumari, and she falls in love with him. This jeopardizes the plans of Prem and Rajkumari's uncle and a horrifying scheme is concocted to stop the love and future relationship of Rajkumari and Ashok.

== Cast ==
- Dharmendra as Ashok (Azaad)
- Hema Malini as Rajkumari Seema
- Ajit as Seema's Uncle
- Prem Chopra as Prem Singh
- Keshto Mukherjee as Ramesh Sharma
- Shoma Anand as Rekha Sharma
- Sulochana Latkar as Sarla
- Viju Khote as Azaad's stooge
- Randhir as Choudhary
- Jankidas as Diwanji
- Master Bhagwan as Ram Singh Bahadur
- Mohan Choti as Mohan Singh

== Soundtrack ==
All the songs were composed by R. D. Burman with lyrics written by Anand Bakshi.

- "Jaan Ki Kasam" was listed at #38 on Binaca Geetmala annual list 1979.

#	Title	Singer(s)
1	"Jaan Ki Kasam"	Kishore Kumar, Lata Mangeshkar
2	"Kaun Mil Gaya"	Lata Mangeshkar
3	"Main Hoon Teri Prem Deewani"	Lata Mangeshkar
4	"Raju Chal Raju"	Kishore Kumar
5	"Mai Laila Ka Majnu"	Kishore Kumar
