= Nirupa Roy =

Indian actress (1931–2004)

- Roy in 1956 film Taksaal
- Born: Kanta Chauhan; 4 January 1931; Bulsar, Bombay Presidency, British India (present-day Valsad, Gujarat, India)
- Died: 13 October 2004 (aged 73); Mumbai, Maharashtra, India
- Other names: Chhibi (pet name); Kokila Balsara (married name)
- Occupations: Actress; Lyricist
- Years active: 1946–2002
- Spouse: Kamal Balsara (later Kamal Roy) (m. 1945)
- Children: Yogesh Roy (son); Kiran Roy (son)
- Awards: Filmfare Best Supporting Actress Award for Munimji (1956); Filmfare Best Supporting Actress Award for Chhaya (1962); Filmfare Best Supporting Actress Award for Shehnai (1965); Filmfare Lifetime Achievement Award (2004)

Nirupa Roy (born Kanta Chauhan; 4 January 1931 – 13 October 2004) was an Indian actress who primarily worked in Hindi films, besides working in a few Gujarati films. Starting her career as a leading actress, Roy became known for her portrayals of Parvati in several mythological films, including Har Har Mahadev (1950). Later she earned further recognition playing motherly roles during the 1970s, and was dubbed the "Queen of Misery" in Hindi film circles due to her portrayals of tragedy and sorrow. Roy was active from 1946 to 2002, appeared in over 250 films, and won three Filmfare Awards throughout her career, and was nominated a total of 4 times. In 2004, Roy received the Filmfare Lifetime Achievement Award.

== Early life ==
Based on her interview to film historian Shishir Krishna Sharma, Nirupa Roy was born to a Gujarati Chauhan household on 4 January 1931 in the city Valsad, Gujarat. Her birth name was Kanta Chauhan although she was addressed as Chhibi by her parents. She was one of the two daughters born to her parents. Her father was employed in the railways. She was only 14 years old in 1945 and was still in school when she was married off to Kamal Balsara following which her name changed to Kokila Balsara and with her husband, they went to Bombay (now Mumbai).

== Career ==
As per what Nirupa Roy herself stated, her marriage had been just 3 to 4 months only when her husband came across an advertisement from Sunrise Pictures in the newspapers which required the lookout for a fresh face for their upcoming Gujarati film Ranakdevi (1946) for which Kamal Balsara himself applied. However, Kamal failed the interview but his wife Kokila Balsara, who had accompanied him to the interview was noticed by the crew present there who immediately offered her the female lead role without an interview for her at all. She accepted the role only after Kamal Balsara insisted her too. Later, she was dismissed from that role and was, instead, given a different and brief role to portray. At the same time, the owner of Sunrise Pictures, film producer and director Vishnukumar Maganlal Vyas changed her name from Kokila Balsara to Nirupa Roy and introduced her with this new name in the film. Soon, Kamal Balsara too changed his family name to Roy and became Kamal Roy.

The first Hindi film she signed was Ajit Pictures' Gunsundari (1948), a Hindi-Gujarati bilingual film opposite Manhar Desai (with whom, she co-starred in several films later on). Her first released film, however, turned out to be Lakhon Mein Ek (1947). However, contrary to what she said, she was first seen in the Hindi film Amar Raj (1946).

As per her, even though mythological, historical and social films had a certain group of actors, Roy remained in demand from all genres to star in. She did almost 50 mytholgical films viz. Har Har Mahadev (1950), Shiv Shakti (1952), Naag Panchami (1953), Shiv Kanya (1954), Sati Madalsa (1955), Sati Naag Kanya (1956), Chandi Pooja (1957) often portraying Sita, Savitri, Parvati and Damyanti. Such was her popularity in mythologicals that people often tend to visit her home and seek blessings.

She also worked in 10 historical films viz. Amarsingh Rathaur (1956), Samrat Chandragupta (1958), Kavi Kalidas (1959), Rani Roopmati (1959), Veer Durgadas (1960) and Razia Sultan (1961). At the same time, she got the offers of both lead, second lead or character roles across social films and family dramas like Uddhar (1949), Hamari Manzil (1949), Mann Ka Meet (1950), Bhagyawaan (1953), Do Bigha Zamin (1953), Garam Coat (1955), Bhai-Bhai (1956), Janam Janam Ke Phere (1957), Kangan (1959), Ghar Ki Laj (1960) etc.

In the film Samrat Chandragupt (1958) starring her, she also wrote the song "Mujhe Dekh Chand Sharmaaye..." sung by Lata Mangeshkar with music by Kalyanji Veerji Shah which was also picturised on her.

The image she created through mythological films was so strong that when she dared to change her image by doing a couple of stunt films like Sinbad The Sailor (1952), Baazigar (1959) or Superman (1960), she didn't receive much success and met with heavy criticism from public, forcing her to stop working in stunt films. She essayed the title role of Superman in its Indianized version titled Superman (1960). This was a rare instance in Hindi Cinema when a woman portrayed a masculine character.

While in mythological films, she was often cast opposite Manhar Desai, Mahipal, Shahu Modak and Trilok Kapoor (with whom she did 18 films), she was often paired with Paidi Jairaj and Bharat Bhushan in historicals while in family dramas, her frequent chemistry used to be opposite Ashok Kumar and Balraj Sahni.

While she had often portrayed motherly characters in several films of 1950s, she was seen in the role of an aged mother for the first time in Munimji (1955). She played the old mother of the male lead, which was played by Dev Anand. She was still in her 20s when she played the role of Dev Anand's mother who himself, in reality, was 8 years older to her and who also worked as a parallel role earlier in Uddhar (1949). She also played the stepmother of Pran's character when Pran himself was 11 years older to her. Same way, the female lead Nalini Jaywant was 5 years older to her. As per Roy herself, she was originally given the heroine's role which required to show the heroine's journey from young to old. Despite completing the role, she was not informed about the changes made where her youth portion was cut and she was replaced there by Nalini Jaywant. Despite this, she received Filmfare Award for Best Supporting Actress though she remained upset from the turn of events during the making of the film.

She transitioned into character roles during the 1960s, winning Filmfare Awards for her performances in Chhaya (1961) and Shehnai (1964). Her other noteworthy performances were in Chand Aur Suraj (1965), Ram Aur Shyam (1967), Aaya Sawan Jhhom Ke (1969), Aan Milo Sajna (1970) and Chhoti Bahu (1971).

Her major success during her second innings arose when she essayed the role of the mother to the characters played by Amitabh Bachchan and Shashi Kapoor made her name synonymous to the impoverished, suffering mother. Her role in Deewaar (1975), especially the iconic dialogue "Mere paas maa hai," became a cultural touchstone and is still cited today. She was offered the role only after Vyjayanthimala had turned it down. She thereby came to be identified as Amitabh Bachchan's mother and did the same in several films alongside playing the mothers of Shashi Kapoor, Dharmendra etc. as well viz. Maa (1976), Amar Akbar Anthony (1977), Ganga Ki Saugand (1978), Muqaddar Ka Sikandar (1978), Suhaag (1979), Gautam Govinda (1979), Ganga Meri Maa (1983), Ganga Jamuna Saraswati (1988), Ganga Tere Desh Mein (1988) etc.

Her roles in Lal Baadshah (1999) where she played Amitabh Bachchan's foster mother, Jahan Tum Le Chalo (1999) where she played Jimmy Shergill's paternal grandmother and Love You Hamesha (2002) were amongst her last films.

== Personal life and death ==
At age 14, she married 23 years old Kamal Balsara (later Kamal Roy; 28 March 1922 - 9 November 2015) in 1945. They had two sons, Yogesh Roy and Kiran Roy. In the years following her death, they engaged into a dispute over Roy's property and belongings, which has received much attention in the news and media. Though she was supported by her husband regarding pursuing a film career, she initially met with heavy criticism for entering the showbiz despite being a married woman by the society, including her father. Though the people in general pacified soon after her first film release, her father remained angry and neither saw her nor spoke to her again till his death. Such was his anger on her that while he was alive, she had to surreptitiously meet her mother.

On 13 October 2004, Roy suffered a cardiac arrest in Mumbai, and died at the age of 73. Her husband Kamal Roy, 9 years older to her, outlived her by 11 years and died at age 93.

Several tributes and articles have been made in Roy's memory. Her dialogues from the film Deewaar became iconic, and her acting in the film along with her other notable films, is considered to be a landmark in Hindi cinema.

== Filmography ==
=== Hindi ===
Year	Film	Role	Notes
1946	Amar Raj	Bakula	Hindi film debut
1947	Lakhon Mein Ek		
1947	Meerabai		Made simultaneously in Gujarati.
1947	Bhanwar		
1948	Gunsundari	Guniyal	First Hindi film she signed; Made simultaneously in Gujarati.
1948	Hip Hip Hurray alias Chaubeji		
1948	Jai Hanuman		
1948	Mitti Ke Khiloune		
1948	Nanand Bhojai		Made simultaneously in Gujarati.
1948	Satyavan Savitri		
1949	Garibi		
1949	Hamari Manzil		
1949	Uddhar		
1950	Alakh Niranjan		
1950	Bhai Bahen		
1950	Har Har Mahadev		
1950	Man Ka Meet		
1950	Veer Bhimsen		
1951	Bare Bhaiyya		
1951	Dasavtaar		
1951	Ishwar Bhakti		
1951	Jai Mahakali		
1951	Kashmir		
1951	Lav Kush		
1951	Maya Machhindra		
1951	Nai Zindagi		
1951	Parnetar		
1951	Ram Janma		
1951	Shri Ganesh Janma		
1951	Shri Vishnu Bhagwan		
1952	Bhakta Puran		
1952	Izzat		
1952	Rajrani Damayanti		
1952	Shiv Shakti		
1952	Sinbad Jahazi		
1952	Veer Arjun		
1953	Bhagyawan		
1953	Do Bigha Zamin	Parvati Mahato (Paro)	
1953	Naulakha Haar	Lakha	
1953	Dharm Patni	Neeru	
1953	Madmust		
1953	Manchala		
1953	Naag Panchami		
1953	Naya Rasta		
1953	Raj Ratan		
1953	Shuk Rambha		
1953	Teen Batti Char Raasta	Kanta	
1954	Aulad		
1954	Aurat Teri Yehi Kahani		
1954	Bilwamangal		
1954	Chakradhari		
1954	Durga Puja		
1954	Hukumat		
1954	Paheli Tarikh		
1954	Shiv Kanya		
1954	Watan		
1955	Bhagwat Mahima		
1955	Garam Coat	Geeta	
1955	Mahasati Savitri		
1955	Munimji	Malti	Won—Filmfare Award for Best Supporting Actress
1955	Navratri		
1955	Oonchi Haveli		
1955	Raj Durbar		
1955	Sati Madalsa		
1955	Shri Ganesh Vivah		
1955	Teen Bhai		
1955	Tonga-Wali	Rajjo	
1955	Waman Avtar		
1956	Amarsingh Rathaur		
1956	Bajrang Bali		
1956	Basant Panchami		
1956	Bhai-Bhai	Lakshmi	
1956	Dashera		
1956	Dwarikadheesh		
1956	Gauri Puja		
1956	Lalkar		
1956	Ram Navami		
1956	Sati Naag Kanya		
1956	Taksaal		
1957	Chandi Pooja		
1957	Do Roti	Malti	
1957	Ek Gaon Ki Kahani	Maya	
1957	Janam Janam Ke Phere	Annapurna	
1957	Krishna Sudama		
1957	Laxmi Pooja		
1957	Mohini	The Queen	
1957	Musafir	Bhanu's Sister-In-Law	
1957	Naag Lok		
1957	Naag Mani		
1957	Narsi Bhagat		
1957	Ram Hanuman Yuddha		
1957	Shesh Naag		
1958	Chaal Baaz		
1958	Dulhan	Sharada	
1958	Karigar	Parvati	
1958	Naag Champa		
1958	Pati Parmeshwar		
1958	Raj Pratigya		
1958	Ram Bhakta Vibhisan		
1958	Samrat Chandragupt	Helena	Also lyricist of the song "Mujhe Dekh Chand Sharmaye..." sung by Lata Mangeshkar with music by Kalyanji Veerji Shah & picturised on herself.
1959	Baazigar		
1959	Bedard Zamana Kya Jane		
1959	Charnon Ki Dasi		
1959	Daaka		
1959	Dr. Z		
1959	Heera Moti		
1959	Kavi Kalidas	Vidyatma	
1959	Kangan	Karuna Das	
1959	Pakshiraj		
1959	Rani Rupmati	Rupmati	
1960	Aanchal	Janaki	
1960	Ghar Ki Laj	Ranjana	
1960	Lal Qilla		
1960	Maya Machhendra		
1960	Superman	Shanti alias Superman	
1960	Veer Durgadas		
1961	Apsara		
1961	Batwara		
1961	Chhaya	Manorama	Won—Filmfare Award for Best Supporting Actress
1961	Dharm Putra	Savitri Rai	
1961	Jai Chitod		
1961	Razia Sultana	Razia Sultana	
1962	Aalha Udal		
1962	Bezuban	Achala	
1962	Bijli Chamke Jamna Paar		
1962	Maa Beta		
1963	Chandrashekhar Azad		
1963	Grahasti	Maya Khanna	
1963	Gumrah	Kamala	
1963	Kaun Apna Kaun Paraya	Mangala	
1963	Mujhe Jeene Do	Champa	
1964	Benazir	Nawab's wife	
1964	Bhakta Dhruv Kumar		
1964	Hameer Hath		
1964	Phoolon Ki Sej	Janaki Verma	
1964	Shehnai	Shobha	Won—Filmfare Award for Best Supporting Actress
1965	Chand Aur Suraj	Kamala Malik	
1965	Shaheed	Durga Bhabi	
1965	Shahi Raqasa		
1965	Shankar Sita Ansuya		
1965	Shri Ram Bharat Milap		
1966	Aasra	Maya	
1966	Laadla	Savitri	
1966	Neend Hamari Khwab Tumhare	Begum Khan Bhadur	
1967	Badrinath Yatra		
1967	Jaal	Sundar Singh's mother	
1967	Ram Aur Shyam	Sulakshana	
1968	Aabroo	Tilottama	
1968	Ek Kali Muskai	Hostel Principal	
1968	Jyot Jale	Sandhya	
1968	Mitti Ka Dev		
1968	Raja Aur Runk	Shanta	
1968	Sadhu Aur Shaitaan	Actress who played Parvati in play	Uncredited special appearance
1969	Aansoo Ban Gaye Phool	Dr. Sumitra	
1969	Anjaana	Raju's mother	
1969	Aya Sawan Jhoom Ke	Maya	
1969	Hum Ek Hain		
1969	Jigri Dost	Annapoorna Das	
1969	Pyar Ka Mausam	Jamuna	
1969	Rahgir		
1969	Surya Devata		
1970	Aan Milo Sajna	Savitri Choudhary	
1970	Abhinetri	Shekhar's Mother	
1970	Ghar Ghar Ki Kahani	Padma	
1970	Gopi	Parvati	
1970	Maa Aur Mamta	Polly	
1970	Maharaja	Radha	
1970	My Love	Durga	
1970	Purab Aur Paschim	Kaushalya	
1971	Chhoti Bahu	Sita	
1971	Ganga Tera Pani Amrit	Shobha	
1971	Jawan Mohabbat	Sunita Sareen	
1971	Nadaan	Ranjana (Rani Maa)	
1971	Sansar	Shobha	
1972	Anokhi Pehchan		
1972	Ek Hasina Do Diwane	Amar's mother	
1972	Janwar Aur Insaan	Gauri	
1972	Jawani Diwani	Madhu Anand	
1973	Kuchhe Dhaage	Thakurain	
1973	Manchali	Leena's aunt	
1973	Pyaar Ka Rishta	Radha	
1973	Taxi Driver		
1974	Badla		
1974	Farebi	Annapoorna	
1974	Roti	Malti	
1974	Zehreela Insaan	Shobha	
1975	Deewar	Sumitra Verma	Nominated—Filmfare Award for Best Supporting Actress
1975	Mounto		
1975	Ponga Pandit	Janaki Nath	
1976	Aap Beati	Laajo Kapoor	
1976	Maa	Vijay's Mother	
1976	Suntan	Tulsi	
1977	Aaina	Savitri	
1977	Aakhri Goli	Janaki Singh	
1977	Amar Akbar Anthony	Bharati	
1977	Anurodh	Radha Mathur	
1977	Hatyara	Prakash's mother	
1977	Kasam Khoon Ki	Shanti	
1977	Khoon Pasina	Shiva's mother	
1978	Anjane Mein	Shanti Lal	
1978	Aankh Ka Tara	Parvati	
1978	Besharam	Ramchandra's mother	
1978	Dil Aur Deewaar	Mother of Saroj & Chandu	
1978	Muqaddar Ka Sikandar	Fatima	Cameo appearance
1978	Ram Kasam	Lakshmi Singh	
1979	Aatish	Shobha Rai	
1979	Gautam Govinda	Ganga	
1979	Jaandaar		
1979	Kartavya	Mother of Vijay & Ajay	
1979	Khandaan	Savitri Shrivastav	
1979	Naalayak		
1979	Suhaag	Durga Kapoor	
1980	Chambal Ki Kasam		
1980	Lootmaar	Satyavati	
1980	Zalim		
1981	Aas Paas	Arun Choudhury's mother	
1981	Jail Yatra	Radha Verma	
1981	Kahani Ek Chor Ki	Gauri	
1981	Katilon Ke Kaatil	Radha Pratap Singh	
1981	Khoon Aur Paani	Son of Ram & Lakshman Singh	
1981	Kranti	Radha	
1981	Professor Pyarelal	Shanti	
1981	Shakka		
1982	Baawri		
1982	Badle Ki Aag	Durga	
1982	Chalti Ka Naam Zindagi		
1982	Deedar-E-Yaar		
1982	Do Dishayen	Neeru	
1982	Do Ustad	Aslsm's mother	
1982	Geet Ganga		
1982	Jaanwar	Durgavati Singh	
1982	Main Intaquam Loonga	Janaki Agnihotri	
1982	Teesri Ankh	Malti Nath	
1982	Teri Kasam	Parvati	
1983	Betaab	Sumitra Kapoor	
1983	Chor Police	Rohan Sinha's mother	Special appearance
1983	Ganga Meri Maa	Ganga	
1983	Mawaali	Mother of Ramesh & Gangu	
1984	Aan Aur Shaan	Kaushalya	
1984	Inquilaab	Amarnath's mother	
1984	Mera Faisla	Raj Saxena's mother	
1984	Ram Tera Desh		
1985	Aaj Ka Daur	Lakshmi Agnihotri	
1985	Geraftaar	Durga Khanna	
1985	Mahaguru	Subhash's mother	
1985	Mard	Durga Singh	
1985	Pataal Bhairavi	Ramu's mother	
1985	Ramkali		
1985	Sarfarosh	Jwala Singh's Mother	
1986	Angaaray	Aarti & Sanjay Verma's mother	
1986	Locket	Lakshmi	
1987	Naam O Nishan	Champa Singh	
1987	Pyaar Karke Dekho		
1988	Aurat Teri Yehi Kahani	Thakurain	
1988	Charanon Ki Saugandh	Malti	
1988	Dharam Shatru		
1988	Do Waqt Ki Roti	Kaushalya	
1988	Gangaa Jamunaa Saraswatih	Bharati	
1988	Ganga Tere Desh Mein	Ajay Nath's mother	
1988	Intaqaam	Birju’s mother	
1988	Pyar Ka Mandir	Lakshmi Kumar	
1988	Sone Pe Suhaaga	Kashinath's mother	
1989	Dana Paani	Satya Prakash Tripathi's mother	
1989	Santosh	Kamala	
1990	Kaarnama	Savitri	
1991	Hai Meri Jaan	Neelam's grandmother	
1991	Jaan Se Badhkar		
1991	Lakhpati		
1991	Pyar Ka Devta	Parvati Kumar	
1991	Pratikar	Parvati Prasad	
1992	Mere Sajana Saath Nibhana	Kanhaiya's Mother	
1992	Humshakal	Vinod's Mother	
1993	Aasoo Bane Angaarey		
1996	Namak	Shanti Sharma	
1999	Jahan Tum Le Chalo	Akash's Grandmother	
1999	Lal Baadshah	Malti Singh	
2002	Love You Hamesha		

=== Gujarati ===
Year	Film	Role	Notes
1946	Ranakdevi		Debut film
1947	Meerabai	Meerabai	
1948	Gunsundari	Guniyal	Made simultaneously in Hindi.
1948	Jivan Palto		
1948	Nanand Bhojai		Made simultaneously in Hindi.
1949	Mangalfera	Shobha	
1949	Sati Sukanya		
1950	Gadano Bel		
1950	Jawabdari		
1961	Chundadi Chokha		
1976	Dharti Mata		
1977	Saubhagya Sindoor		
1985	Maanu Mangalsutra		

== Awards and nominations ==
Year	Award	Category	Work	Result
1956	Filmfare Awards	Best Supporting Actress	Munimji	Won
1962	Filmfare Awards	Best Supporting Actress	Chhaya	Won
1965	Filmfare Awards	Best Supporting Actress	Shehnai	Won
1976	Filmfare Awards	Best Supporting Actress	Deewaar	Nominated
2004	Filmfare Awards	Lifetime Achievement Award	—N/a	Won
