= Chhaya (film) =

- Directed by: Hrishikesh Mukherjee
- Written by: Sachin Bhowmick; Rajendra Krishan
- Produced by: A. V. Meiyappan
- Starring: Sunil Dutt; Asha Parekh; Nirupa Roy
- Cinematography: Jaywant Pathare; T. B. Seetaram
- Edited by: R. G. Gope
- Music by: Salil Chowdhury
- Release date: 3 August 1961
- Country: India
- Language: Hindi

Chhaya (English: Shadow) is a 1961 Bollywood film directed by Hrishikesh Mukherjee. The film stars Sunil Dutt, Asha Parekh, Nirupa Roy, Nazir Hussain in pivotal roles. Nirupa Roy won the Filmfare Best Supporting Actress Award. Music was composed by Salil Chowdhury.

== Plot ==
Manorama (Nirupa Roy) comes to Lucknow along with her infant daughter after the death of her husband Shyamlal (Krishan Dhawan), searching for her maternal uncle. But when she finds that her uncle sold his house and has died, she becomes clueless and has nowhere to go. Moreover, her infant daughter becomes sick due to lack of food and shelter. Desperate to save her, Manorama leaves her at the gate of a wealthy man, Seth Jagatnarayan Chaudhary (Nazir Hussain). Jagatnarayan, having no children for himself, decides to adopt her and names her as Sarita. After few days, Manorama comes again as a nanny and settles with them. Jagatnarayan moves to Bombay to start a new life and to hide the fact that Sarita wasn't his biological daughter. There, they are joined by his sister Rukmini (Lalita Pawar) and her son Lalli (Mohan Choti).

Sarita (Asha Parekh) grows up to be a beautiful, intelligent and carefree young girl under the care of her father and nanny. A young man, Arun (Sunil Dutt) gets appointed as a tutor to Sarita. Sarita later learns that he was indeed her favorite poet who writes under the pen name of Rahi and gets attracted to him. They grow close and Arun's family wants them to get married. But they get rejected by Jagatnarayan on the grounds of their poverty, leaving Arun and Sarita disappointed.

Jagatnarayan settles Sarita's match with the only son of a wealthy man, Motilal. But Manorama, after seeing Sarita's plight, decides to stop that marriage at any rate and writes a letter to Motilal explaining that Sarita wasn't Jagatnarayan's biological daughter. Enraged, Motilal confirms it with Jagatnarayan and cancels the engagement. Jagatnarayan, having no other way, agrees to marry Sarita to Arun. But he sends Manorama away from his house as she revealed the secret to destroy Sarita's future.

During the wedding ceremony, Manorama comes for one last time to give her blessings to Sarita, and gets insulted by Jagatnarayan's sister. She leaves to commit suicide as she thinks that she has finished all her responsibilities towards Sarita. But Jagatnarayan finds the photo of young Sarita with her biological parents in Manorama's luggage and by adding one thing to another, concludes that Manorama was indeed Sarita's biological mother. They go searching for her and find her at railway track. Sarita calls her mother for the first time, stopping her from committing suicide. They request her to come back and stay with them and everybody reconciles.

== Cast ==
- Sunil Dutt as Arun / Rahi
- Asha Parekh as Sarita
- Nirupa Roy as Manorama
- Nazir Hussain as Seth Jagatnarayan Chaudhary
- Lalita Pawar as Rukmini Chaudhary
- Achala Sachdev as Arun's Elder Sister
- Mohan Choti as Lalli
- Ashim Kumar as Ramu / Romeo
- Krishan Dhawan as Shyamlal
- Asit Sen as Dard
- Baby Farida as Young Sarita

== Music ==
The music for this movie was composed by Salil Chowdhury and the songs penned by Rajinder Krishan. The song "Itna Na Mujhse Tu Pyaar Badha" is based on Mozart's 40th symphony.

Song	Singer
"Ya Keh De Hum Insan"	Mohammed Rafi
"Chham Chham Nachat"	Lata Mangeshkar
"Dil Se Dil Ki Dor Bandhe Chori Chori Jane"	Lata Mangeshkar, Mukesh
"Itna Na Mujhse Tu Pyar Badha" (Duet)	Lata Mangeshkar, Talat Mahmood
"Itna Na Mujhse Tu" (Sad)	Talat Mahmood
"Aankhon Mein Masti"	Talat Mahmood
"Aansoo Samajhke"	Talat Mahmood

Two songs are set in Hindustani ragas: "Chham Chham Nachat" (Bahar) and "Aansoo Samajhke" (Yaman Kalyan).
