= V. K. Murthy =

Indian cinematographer

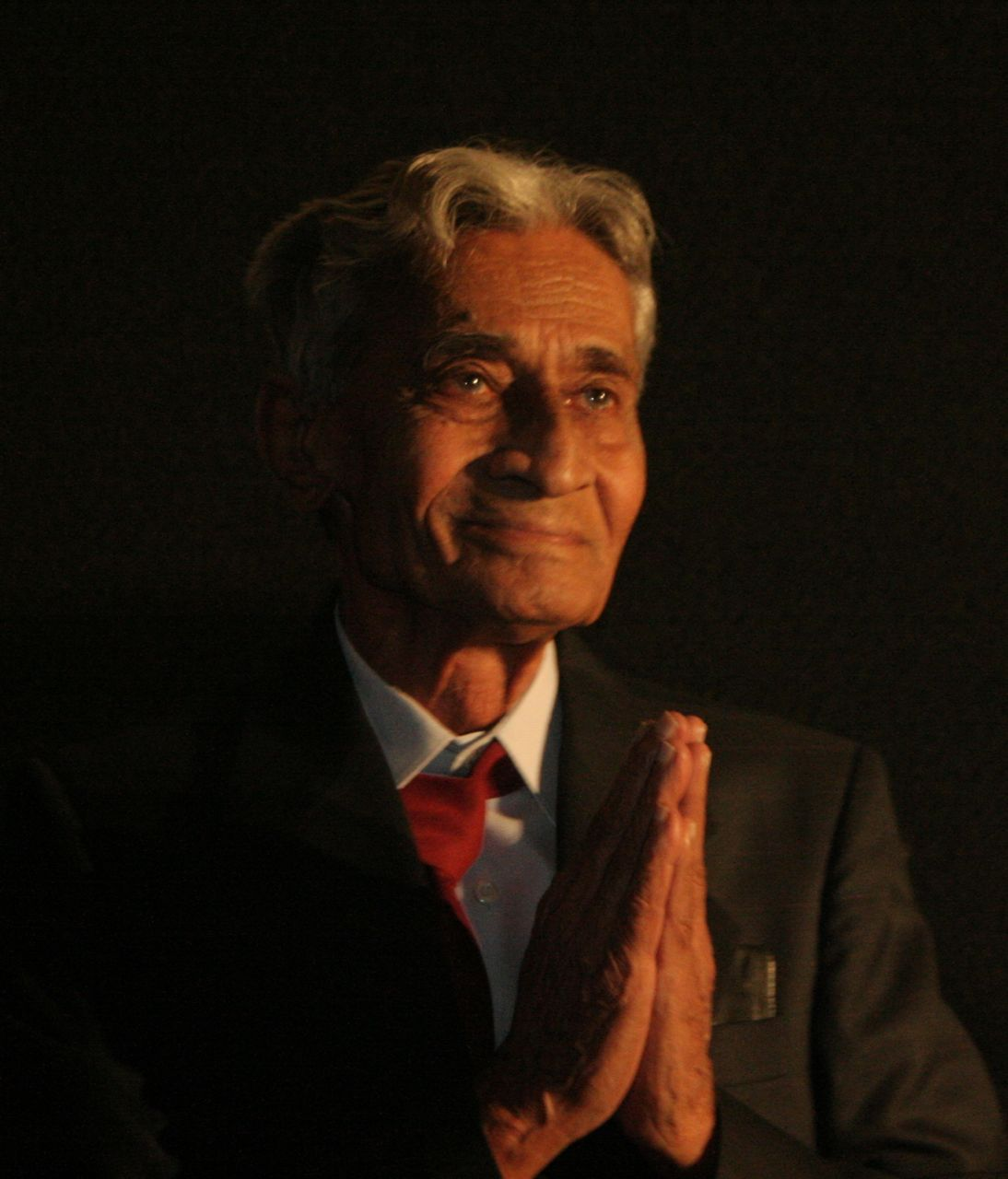
- Murthy in 2010
- Born: Venkatarama Pandit Krishnamurthy; 26 November 1923; Mysore, Kingdom of Mysore, British India
- Died: 7 April 2014 (aged 90); Bengaluru, India
- Occupation: Cinematographer
- Years active: 1951–2001
- Awards: Dadasaheb Phalke Award (2008)

Venkatarama Pandit Krishnamurthy (26 November 1923 – 7 April 2014) known professionally as V. K. Murthy, was an Indian cinematographer. Murthy, a one-time violinist and jailed freedom fighter, was Guru Dutt's regular cameraman on his movies. He provided some of Indian cinema's most notable images in starkly contrasted black and white. He also shot India's first cinemascope film, Kaagaz Ke Phool. For his contribution to film industry, particularly Indian film industry he was awarded the IIFA Lifetime Achievement Award in 2005. In 2010, he was honoured with the Dada Saheb Phalke Award for his contributions to Indian cinema.

== Early life ==
Murthy was born in Mysore on 26 November 1923. He studied at the Lakshmipuram school, where he chose music as his elective subject and learned to play the violin. He obtained his Diploma in Cinematography from Sri Jayachamarajendra Polytechnic (the present Government Film and Television Institute) in Bangalore in 1946. As a student, he took part in the Indian freedom struggle and was jailed in 1943. Feeling strongly attracted to the visual medium and wishing to pursue a career in the field, he quit his studies and left for Bombay (now Mumbai).

== Career ==
Murthy began his career in films with Maharana Prathap. He worked as an assistant to cinematographer V. Ratra in the 1951 film Baazi which was Guru Dutt's first as a director. Dutt, impressed by Murthy's smooth and fluid captures with the camera, took him on for his next film Jaal (1952), which was Murthy's first film as a chief cinematographer. Murthy, then became a part of the Guru Dutt team, till the latter's death in 1964.

In 1959 came Guru Dutt's Kaagaz Ke Phool, a film critically acclaimed as one of the director's best. More than anything else, it won many accolades for its cinematography and created unparalleled history in the field. V. K. Murthy, as the cinematographer won widespread praise and received the Filmfare Award for Best Cinematographer. He repeated the feat with Sahib Bibi Aur Ghulam winning the award again in 1962. He worked exclusively with Dutt until the director's death. Some of Murthy's best work came in Guru Dutt's movies like Pyaasa, Sahib Bibi Aur Ghulam and Aar Paar. Following Dutt's death, Murthy worked with Kamal Amrohi on his masterpiece, Pakeezah and Razia Sultan. Post Guru Dutt, he like many of the director's team was not able to give any pinnacle work. In later years, he worked with directors like Pramod Chakravarthy (Naya Zamana, Jugnu), Shyam Benegal and Govind Nihalani (Tamas).

Murthy was also the cinematographer for one of the most acclaimed Kannada film Hoovu Hannu, a directorial production of Rajendra Singh Babu and also appeared in that film in a role. Murthy was also the principal cinematographer of the widely acclaimed television series produced by Doordarshan and directed by Shyam Benegal, Bharat Ek Khoj.

== Awards ==
- Filmfare Best Cinematographer Award – Kaagaz Ke Phool (1959)
- Filmfare Best Cinematographer Award – Sahib Bibi Aur Ghulam (1962)
- IIFA Lifetime Achievement Award – Amsterdam, 2005.
- Dada Saheb Phalke Award for 2008

== Retirement and death ==
Aged 80, Murthy moved back to Bangalore from Mumbai in 2001 to lead a retired life at his residence in Shankarapuram in Basavanagudi, Bangalore. He died of natural causes aged 91 on 7 April 2014 at his residence in Bangalore. He is survived by his daughter Chaya Murthy.

== Selected filmography ==
1. Hoovu Hannu (1993) (One and only Kannada movie)
2. Deedar (1992)
3. Khule Aam (1992)
4. Kalyug Aur Ramayan (1987)
5. Nastik (1983)
6. Jugnu (1973)
7. Naya Zamana (1971)
8. Suraj (1966)
9. Love in Tokyo (1966)
10. Ziddi (1964)
11. Sahib Bibi Aur Ghulam (1962)
12. Chaudhvin Ka Chand (1960)
13. Kaagaz Ke Phool (1959)
14. 12 O'Clock (1958)
15. Pyaasa (1957)
16. C.I.D. (1956)
17. Mr. & Mrs. '55 (1955)
18. Aar-Paar (1954)
19. Baaz (1953)
20. Jaal (1952)
21. Baazi (1951)
