= Aan Milo Sajna =

1970 Hindi-language musical drama film

- Poster
- Directed by: Mukul Dutt
- Written by: Sachin Bhowmick; Ehsan Rizvi (dialogues)
- Screenplay by: Sachin Bhowmick
- Story by: Sachin Bhowmick
- Produced by: Jagdish Kumar
- Starring: Rajesh Khanna; Asha Parekh; Vinod Khanna; Nirupa Roy
- Cinematography: V. Babasaheb
- Edited by: Pratap Dave
- Music by: Laxmikant–Pyarelal
- Color process: Eastmancolor
- Production companies: Famous Cine Studios; Filmistan Studio; Natraj Studios; Rajkamal Studios
- Distributed by: Baba Digital Media; Shemaroo Video Pvt. Ltd.
- Release date: 24 December 1970
- Country: India
- Language: Hindi
- Box office: ₹5 crore (equivalent to ₹247 crore or US$26 million in 2023)

Aan Milo Sajna (transl. Come, my darling) is a 1970 Hindi-language musical drama film written by Sachin Bhowmick, produced by Jagdish Kumar and directed by Mukul Dutt. The film stars Rajesh Khanna and Asha Parekh in the lead roles and the supporting cast included Vinod Khanna, Rajendra Nath and Nirupa Roy. The music is by Laxmikant Pyarelal with lyrics by Anand Bakshi. The film became a super hit at the box office and the song "Acha to Hum Chalte Hain" was a phenomenon. This film is counted among the 17 consecutive hit films of Rajesh Khanna between 1969 and 1971, by adding the two-hero films Marayada and Andaz to the 15 consecutive solo hits he gave from 1969 to 1971. During the interval of other films released in 1970, when the trailer for Aan Milo Sajna, used to be played, crowds would erupt as soon as Rajesh Khanna arrived on the screen.

== Plot summary ==
Widowed and ailing Savitri Choudhury lives a wealthy lifestyle along with her son, Anil, in a palatial mansion in India. She knows that Anil is only waiting for her to die so that he can inherit the wealth and refuses to give him any money. The Diwan convinces Anil to mend his ways, get married, and patch-up with his mom. Shortly thereafter, Anil does appear to have mended his ways, gets involved in charity, and even introduces a young woman named Deepali to his mom. Deepali moves into the mansion and looks after Savitri so much so that Savitri decides to make her the sole beneficiary of her estate. What Savitri does not know is that Anil has hired Deepali to act as his fiancée, and that Deepali herself is not who she claims to be, and is actually in love with a local horse-riding peasant, Ajit, whose father was convicted of killing Savitri's husband, and soon Ajit himself will be arrested by the police for having an affair with and then killing a woman named Sita.

== Cast ==
- Rajesh Khanna – Ajit
- Asha Parekh – Varsha / Deepali
- Vinod Khanna – Anil Choudhary
- Nirupa Roy – Savitri Choudhary (Anil Choudhary's Mother)
- Rajendra Nath – Muft Ram Mauji
- Mehmood Junior – Chicoo
- Aruna Irani- Deepali (Varsha's Friend)
- Tarun Bose – Judge (Varsha's Father)
- Sujit Kumar – Mohan
- Abhi Bhattacharya – Ramesh Babu (Ajit's Father)
- Indrani Mukherjee – Seeta (Wife of Mohan)
- Dulari – Kaushalya Devi (Ajit's mother)
- Chaman Puri – Diwan Ji
- Birbal – Govardhan
- Shivraj – Father of Mohan
- Sunder (actor) – Maghnga Ram

== Soundtrack ==
Aan Milo Sajna

Soundtrack album by Laxmikant–Pyarelal
- Released: 1970
- Genre: Film soundtrack
- Language: Hindi
- Label: Odeon Records

The musical score for the film was composed by Laxmikant–Pyarelal and the lyrics were written by Anand Bakshi.

#	Song	Singer	Duration
1	"Achchha To Hum Chalte Hai"	Kishore Kumar, Lata Mangeshkar	04:56
2	"Jawaani O Deewani"	Kishore Kumar	04:47
3	"Koi Nazrana Lekar Aaya Hu"	Mohammed Rafi	05:45
4	"Rang Rang Ke Phool Khile (Aan Milo Sajna)"	Lata Mangeshkar, Mohammed Rafi	06:29
5	"Tere Kaaran Mere Saajan"	Lata Mangeshkar	05:03
6	"Palat Meri Jaan, Tere Qurbaan"	Asha Bhosle	04:43
