= Insaaf Ka Khoon =

1991 Bollywood film

Insaaf Ka Khoon is a 1991 Bollywood film starring Rajendra Kumar and Asha Parekh.

== Plot ==
Janki (played by Asha Parekh) lives a middle-class lifestyle along with her husband, Balraj and a young daughter, Jyoti. Balraj works as a journalist and is ready to expose an underworld gangster named Jagdish, but his editor, Mathur, refuses to let him do so. One night, the police are informed that Balraj has killed Mathur with a knife. Balraj is arrested, tried in court, found guilty, and sentenced to be hanged. Janki goes to Judge Kumar (Rajendra Kumar) to plead about his innocence, but Kumar refuses to do anything and Balraj is hanged.

Janki re-locates to live with a hoodlum named Gopi (Prem Chopra) and this is where Jyoti (Shoma Anand) grows up, attends college and falls in love with Deepak. When Janki finds out that Deepak is Kumar's son, she refuses to let Jyoti meet with Deepak, and Kumar also prevents Deepak from seeing Jyoti. Then the police arrest Deepak for killing Jagdish. The evidence is against Deepak and if found guilty he will be hanged. Watch what happens when Kumar finds Janki may be the only one who can save Deepak from the gallows.

== Soundtrack ==
Song	Singer
"Farebi Lootere Awaara Lafange Behaya"	Asha Bhosle, Vinod Sehgal
"Tere Bin Dil Dhadakta Hai, Tu Aaja, Dil Tadapta Hai"	Asha Bhosle, Vinod Sehgal
"Tere Mere Pyar Ki Baat Phail Gayi Zamane Mein"	Asha Bhosle, Vinod Sehgal
