= Aya Sawan Jhoom Ke =

- Poster
- Directed by: Raghunath Jhalani
- Written by: Sachin Bhowmick (screenplay); Sarashar Sailani (story, dialogue)
- Produced by: J. Om Prakash
- Starring: Dharmendra; Asha Parekh; Nazir Hussain; Nirupa Roy
- Cinematography: V. Babasaheb
- Edited by: Pratap Dave
- Music by: Laxmikant–Pyarelal
- Production company: Filmyug
- Release date: 1969
- Running time: 173 minutes
- Country: India
- Language: Hindi

Aya Sawan Jhoom Ke (transl. The monsoon came dancing) is a 1969 Indian Hindi-language romantic drama film directed by Raghunath Jhalani and produced by J. Om Prakash. The film stars Dharmendra, Asha Parekh, Nazir Hussain, Nirupa Roy, Bindu, Aruna Irani, and Rajindernath in pivotal roles.

The film opened to positive reception from critics and audiences alike for its soundtrack, story and performances, eventually emerging a superhit and one of the highest-grossing films of 1969.

== Synopsis ==
The plot follows wealthy playboy Jai, who accidentally kills his lover Aarti's father in a car crash on his way to ask for her hand in marriage. Complications arise when Aarti discovers the truth and subsequently catches Jai in a compromising position with a cabaret dancer, leading to his disownment and wrongful arrest for murder.

== Cast ==
- Dharmendra as Jaishankar 'Jai'
- Asha Parekh as Aarti
- Ravindra Kapoor as Rajesh
- Nazir Hussain as Lala Jugal Kishore
- Rajendra Nath as Sadhuram Sood
- Nirupa Roy as Maya
- Sunder as Dr. Yudhvir Singh
- Shivraj as Aarti's Father
- Laxmi Chhaya as Rita
- Bindu as Seeta
- Aruna Irani as Mala
- Jalal Agha as Deepak
- Dulari as Mrs. Jugal Kishore
- Nazir Kashmiri as Madho
- Kumari Naaz as Sangeeta Y. Singh

== Production ==
The team of the 1966 film Aaye Din Bahar Ke, including producer (J. Om Prakash), director (Raghunath Jhalani), actors (Dharmendra, Asha Parekh) and composer (Laxmikant–Pyarelal) reunited for Aya Sawan Jhoom Ke.

== Soundtrack ==
The film's soundtrack was composed by Laxmikant–Pyarelal, with lyrics penned by their frequent collaborator Anand Bakshi.

- Aya Sawan Jhoom Ke was listed at #19 on Binaca Geetmala annual list 1969

#	Song	Singer
1	"Maajhi Chal O Maajhi Chal"	Mohammed Rafi
2	"Bura Mat Suno, Bura Mat Dekho"	Mohammed Rafi
3	"Yeh Shama To Jali Roshni Ke Liye"	Mohammed Rafi
4	"Aya Sawan Jhoom Ke"	Lata Mangeshkar, Mohammed Rafi
5	"Saathiya Nahin Jaana"	Lata Mangeshkar, Mohammed Rafi
6	"Rama Duhai Mere"	Lata Mangeshkar
7	"Main Ek Haseena"	Asha Bhosle
