= Samadhi (1972 film) =

- Poster
- Directed by: Prakash Mehra
- Produced by: Bhagwant Singh; G. L. Khanna
- Starring: Dharmendra; Asha Parekh; Jaya Bhaduri
- Music by: R. D. Burman
- Production company: Sangam Arts International
- Release date: 22 December 1972
- Country: India
- Language: Hindi

Samadhi is a 1972 Hindi film directed by Prakash Mehra. The film stars Dharmendra in double role as father and son, along with Asha Parekh and Jaya Bhaduri as their love interests. The music was composed by R. D. Burman. The memorable songs in the film include "Kaanta Laga", "Jab Tak Rahe" and "Jaan-E-Jaana".

== Cast ==
- Dharmendra as Daku Lakhan Singh / Jaswant "Ajay" (double role)
- Asha Parekh as Champa Singh
- Jaya Bhaduri as Rekha
- Madan Puri as Jaggu
- Abhi Bhattacharya as Seth Manoharlal
- Dulari as Mrs. Manoharlal
- Leela Mishra as Mausi
- Tun Tun as Kalavati
- Sunder
- Randhir
- Keshav Rana as Jailor
- M. B. Shetty
- Bhushan Tiwari

== Soundtrack ==
"Kaanta Laga" is the most popular song from the film, and was remixed by T-Series album DJ Doll with an accompanying music video starring Shefali Jariwala.

All lyrics are penned by Majrooh Sultanpuri.

Song	Singer
"Jaan-E-Jaana Jaao"	Kishore Kumar
"Maine Dekha Ek Sapna, Kya Dekha Bolo Na Bolo Na"	Kishore Kumar, Lata Mangeshkar
"Kaanta Laga, Hay Laga"	Lata Mangeshkar
"Jab Tak Rahe Tan Mein"	Asha Bhosle
"O Yaara Yaara"	Asha Bhosle
"Yeh Khel Hai Taqdeer Ke"	Manna Dey

== Remakes ==
The film was remade in Bangladesh as Badshah in 1975, directed by Akbar Kabir Pintu. It stars Kamrul Alam Khan Khasru in double role as father and son, along with Shabana and Nuton as their love interests. It was also remade in Telugu as Nindu Manishi in 1978.
