= Ziddi (1964 film) =

- Directed by: Pramod Chakravorty
- Written by: Sachin Bhowmick (screenplay); Sachin Bhowmick (story); Agha Jani Kashmiri (dialogue); Aijaz Tishna (dialogue director)
- Produced by: Pramod Chakravorty
- Starring: Joy Mukherjee; Asha Parekh; Mehmood Ali
- Cinematography: V.K. Murthy
- Edited by: Dharamvir
- Music by: Sachin Dev Burman
- Release date: 1964
- Country: India
- Language: Hindi

Ziddi (English: Stubborn) is a 1964 Hindi film directed by Pramod Chakravorty, starring Joy Mukherjee and Asha Parekh.

The film has music by S. D. Burman and lyrics by Hasrat Jaipuri, creating hits like "Raat Ka Samaa". It went on to become the fourth highest-grossing film at the Indian Box Office of the year.

== Plot ==
On the lookout for employment, Ashok (Joy Mukherjee) sees the photographs of beautiful Asha (Asha Parekh), and decides to accept employment as the estate's Manager. His expectations are short-lived as Asha turns out to be a rich, spoiled, conceited bratty young lady. To complicate matters further, Seema (Nazima), Asha's sister is attracted to Ashok. Ashok and Asha do like and eventually end up in love with each other, but Ashok's dad (Ulhas) does not approve to their marriage as he knows of Asha's parentage, a father who is an escaped convict, in jail for murder, and a mother whose profession was: prostitution. Ashok himself sees Asha in her true colors when she sings and dances at a party, overly intoxicated.

== Cast ==
- Joy Mukherjee as Ashok Shankar
- Asha Parekh as Asha Singh
- Mehmood as Mahesh
- Shobha Khote as Sheela
- Dhumal as Ramdas
- Raj Mehra as Thakur Mahendra Singh
- Sulochana Latkar as Laxmi Singh
- Nazima as Seema Singh
- Mumtaz Begum as Judge's Wife
- Bela Bose as Ashok's Sister
- Madan Puri as Moti

== Soundtrack ==
Song	Singer
"Teri Surat Se Nahin Milti"	Mohammed Rafi
"Pyar Ki Manzil Mast Safar"	Mohammed Rafi
"Janu Kya Mera Dil Ab Kahan"	Mohammed Rafi
"Champakali Dekho Jhuk Hi Gayi Re"	Mohammed Rafi, Asha Bhosle
"Main Tere Pyar Mein Kya Kya Na Bana Dilbar"	Geeta Dutt, Manna Dey
"Pyar Ki Aag Mein Tan Badan Jal Gaya"	Manna Dey
"Raat Ka Sama Jhoome Chandramaa"	Lata Mangeshkar
"Yeh Meri Zindagi Ek Pagal Hawaa"	Lata Mangeshkar

Several songs are set in Hindustani ragas: "Champakali Dekho Jhuk Hi Gayi Re" (Pilu) and "Pyar Ki Aag Mein Tan Badan Jal Gaya" (Darbari).
