= Love in Tokyo =

Love In Tokyo
- Theatrical release poster
- Directed by: Pramod Chakravorty
- Written by: Sachin Bhowmick
- Produced by: Pramod Chakravorty
- Starring: Joy Mukherjee; Asha Parekh; Mehmood; Pran
- Cinematography: V.K. Murthy
- Edited by: Dharamvir
- Music by: Shankar Jaikishan; Hasrat Jaipuri (lyrics); Shailendra (lyrics)
- Release date: 18 November 1966
- Running time: 170 minutes
- Country: India
- Language: Hindi

Love In Tokyo is a 1966 Indian Hindi-language romantic comedy film directed and produced by Pramod Chakravorty. The film was a hit at the box office.

== Plot ==
A young man Ashok's (Joy Mukherjee) mother makes him go to Tokyo, Japan in search of his deceased elder brother's and his wife (also dead)'s son, Ashok's nephew Chikoo. He is unhappy because he is in a loveless relationship with his fiancée Sarita. Chikoo is in an orphanage and taken in by Ashok, his uncle. Ashok tries to convince Chikoo to come back to India with him, but Chikoo refuses and runs away. Meanwhile, Mahesh (Mehmood), Ashok's friend, is in love with Sheela (Shubha Khote) but her dad finds out and has goons (this is what the opening scene is) chase Mahesh, Sheela's father then takes her to Tokyo where Mahesh follows them and ends up at their shop "Indian Art Emporium", and pretends to dress up as a Sadhu Ascetic. He also falsely says to clear his sins that he needs to go to a river and he must say "I befriend Mahesh". Mahesh calls the police and tells them Sheela's father is committing suicide which is not true. Mahesh then pursues Sheela and sings a song "Maine Tera Pyar Ka Bimar" while chasing her at a theme park, he then reveals his identity to her while singing the song, Chikoo meets Asha (Asha Parekh) who's on the run from Pran and her uncle (who later turns out to be her biological father) Her father's apparent "last Wish" was for her to marry Pran (played by Pran) but she doesn't and this is why she runs away, Pran only wants her for her money. Asha and Chikoo go to a tea house for food but two women quickly recognize her as her uncle and Pran had a reward of 5,000 dollars for the person who finds her first. They run away and Pran finds Asha trying to climb a roof to escape, Chikoo saves her by pretending to be hit by Pran's car when he tries to bring Asha back to her uncle's home. The pair escape and disguise themselves. Asha pretends to be a Sardar (Sikh man) and Chikoo pretends to be a girl, they then head to a restaurant. Ashok sees through their disguise and Chikoo falls from the window and goes to the hospital. Meanwhile, Pran & Sheela's father are at the same geisha house, Pran quickly goes and Mahesh disguises himself as geisha and calls himself an "international geisha" and drugs Sheela's father with Sake and quickly leaves to Sheela. Meanwhile, Chikoo recovers and is sent back home while Asha maintains her disguise as a Sardar and pretends to be Chikoo's Biological Aunt (his mother's sister) and calls herself Chizuru. Ashok finds himself falling in love with Asha and she sings "Sayonara Sayonara". He goes back home where Asha is again disguised as Sardar Ji. She cuts her finger and Ashok puts a bandage on it. Asha disguised as Chikoo's Aunt goes to meet Ashok again and falls in love with him too, when they are about to kiss, she puts her hand on his face to stop him and Ashok finds out who she really is from the bandage as he himself tied it. The next day a mailman comes to Asha's hotel room and gives her a letter from Ashok, in the letter it says that He and Chikoo have gone on the 5 p.m. flight to Mumbai, India. She jumps into a taxi and heads for the airport but is too late, or so it seems. She ends up missing the "supposed flight" where Chikoo and Ashok are on. Devastated she goes to The Tokyo Shrine, that when she was disguised told Ashok that you pray there for lost love. She goes there and Ashok Follows her. In disbelief, Asha realizes Ashok and Chikoo didn't actually leave and Ashok sings " Mere Shah e Khuba". Mahesh (disguised) meets them and asks them for their help in marrying Sheela, as her father is getting her married to Chatterjee, an ugly man. Sheela pretends to be mute and Mahesh arrives dressing as an Arab doctor Aziz Mahamood. Sheela's father sees through his disguise and kicks him out. Mahesh goes to a costume store and gets a wig and toupee to look like Chatterjee. He then goes through the marriage ceremony and they become married, at the end, the real Chatterjee shows up, realizing it's Mahesh. It is too late. They end up spending their honeymoon at a traditional onsen, Mahesh runs away realizing its Sheela's dad, on the way he bumps into a scientists table and mixes the chemicals on his shoes giving him the ability to fly, on the way he saves a woman's child from getting run over by a train and holds onto a helicopter. Asha is then found by Pran and is imprisoned in her uncle's home. Mahesh, Sheela, and Chikoo show up as a Muslim couple looking for their child named Ghulfam and barge into the house. They hand Asha a tape with Chikoo's Voice and Sheela and Mahesh sing to "find him" and call the police. Asha pretends to tie him up and Chikoo tells the police that Asha's uncle had kidnapped him and took him in his car. Asha manages to escape and the group is almost caught so Asha slips into Sheela's Burqa and Pretends to be Mahesh's wife. Mahesh tells Pran that his father left a fortune for him when he died. They escape ad Sheela's father arrive with the police. Meanwhile, Asha and Ashok fall in love. Ashok's "fiancée" Sarita and her father along with Ashok's mother Gayatri Devi come to Japan. Asha and Ashok attend a party and Ashok sings "Aa Ja Re Aa Zara". When leaving for a tour of tokyo, Ashok's Mother catches them hugging and screams, and throws insults at Asha when she didn't even know Ashok had a fiancée, Chikoo, mad pelts Raisaheb, (Sarita's father) and Sarita slaps him he goes to Asha and explains why he did that. Asha says to forgive his grandmother and hold Raisahebs feet and apologize to him for pelting him in the eye. Asha leaves to commit suicide and goes to the Tokyo shrine once again. singing "mere shah e khuba" Ashok finds Asha and as he chases her, she runs away and Pran's car hits Ashok causing him to have an accident. Sarita, Ashok's fiancée and the rest of Ashok's family find out that Ashok may be blind after the operation. Sarita not wanting to be with a blind man all her life and backs out from the marriage. Raisaheb finds it to be a good thing because they can take advantage of Ashok's family and spend their money. Chikoo hears this and exposes their plan to his grandmother to make her understand how greedy they are. Asha comes out ready to give Ashok her eyes. Ashok's Mother finds that Ashok and Asha are meant to be, thankfully Ashok turns out to not be blind and still has his eyesight. Asha's uncle and Pran are at their engagement party and say that Pran and Asha were in love and had a child in wedlock and need to marry to avoid public scorn. Ashok's mother becomes so crushed by that she shuns her again. Asha's uncle holds Chikoo hostage and threatens to kill him, he also says that unless she marries Pran her life and Ashok will be destroyed. Doing so she goes and Ashok finds her and breaks in and rescues her from Pran's clutches they get their happily ever after and the movie ends with everyone happy.

== Production ==
The movie was written by Sachin Bhowmick and produced and directed by Pramod Chakravorty. The film stars Joy Mukherjee, Asha Parekh, Pran, Mehmood, Lalita Pawar, Asit Sen, Shubha Khote, and Madan Puri. The music was composed by Shankar Jaikishan, while Hasrat Jaipuri wrote the lyrics. Joy Mukherjee had also worked, in the hit film Love in Simla. The success of Love in Tokyo, led to the making of Love in Bombay also starring Mukherjee. All the three films are part of Joy Mukherjee's Love in trilogy.

== Cast and characters ==
Character	Portrayed By
Ashok	Joy Mukherjee
Asha / Chizuru / Sardar Ji	Asha Parekh
Mahesh	Mehmood
Pran	Pran
Sheela	Shobha Khote
Dharamdas, Sheela's dad	Dhumal
Chikoo	Master Shahid
Gayatri Devi (Ashoks mother)	Lalita Pawar
Chatterjee	Asit Sen
Mohan	Mohan Choti
Pukhraj, Asha's uncle and biological father	Madan Puri
Jaywant, Sarita's dad	Ulhas
Doctor P.C. Roy	Tarun Bose
Sarita	Lata Bose
Lawyer Khanna	Murad

== Soundtrack ==
The music of the film, was composed by Shankar-Jaikishan. All songs had chart success, in 1966. All songs are still played today. The lyrics were written by Hasrat Jaipuri and Shailendra.

Song	Singer	Lyrics	Raga
"Koi Matwala Aaya"	Lata Mangeshkar	Shailendra	
"Sayonara Sayonara (さよならさよなら)"	Lata Mangeshkar	Hasrat Jaipuri	Bhoopali
"Mujhe Tum Mil Gaye"	Lata Mangeshkar	Hasrat Jaipuri	
"O Mere Shah-E-Khuba"	Lata Mangeshkar	Hasrat Jaipuri	
"O Mere Shah-E-Khuba"	Mohammed Rafi	Hasrat Jaipuri	
"Aa Ja Re Aa Zara"	Mohammed Rafi	Hasrat Jaipuri	
"Love In Tokyo"	Mohammed Rafi	Hasrat Jaipuri	
"Main Tere Pyar Ka Bimar"	Manna Dey	Hasrat Jaipuri	

== Filming ==
The film was shot primarily in Japan at locations including Tokyo, Ueno, Ginza, Tokyo Tower, Tokyo International Airport and Hiroshima.

== Nominations ==
Filmfare Nomination for Best Performance in a Comic Role--Mehmood

== Legacy ==
In this movie Asha Parekh's ponytail was held by a hair clip that consisted of two beads on a rubber band. In India this type of clip is known as "Love in Tokyo".
