= Sachin Bhowmick =

Film screenwriter and director (1930–2011)

- Born: 17 July 1930; Calcutta, British India
- Died: 12 April 2011 (aged 80); Mumbai, India
- Occupations: Screenwriter, director, author
- Years active: 1958–2008

Sachin Bhowmick (17 July 1930 – 12 April 2011) was an Indian Hindi film writer and director. Writing was his main work and he wrote stories or screenplays for over 94 films. He is best remembered for directing the light romantic black comedy classic Raja Rani (1973). He was also a regular contributor to Ultorath, a Bengali magazine on cinema. Due to the Bengali pronunciation of his surname Bhaumick we will find his surname spelled as Bhowmick in numerous sites.

His name served as the inspiration for an eponymous character played by Kharaj Mukherjee in the 2018 romance Dhadak.

== Writing highlights ==
He started his writing career with the screenplay for Mohan Segal's Nargis starrer Lajwanti in 1958.

=== 1960s ===
In the 1960s he was associated with several hits such as Anuradha (1960), which won the National Film Award for Best Feature Film, Ayee Milan Ki Bela, Jaanwar (1965), Love in Tokyo (1966), Aaye Din Bahar Ke (1966), An Evening in Paris (1967), Brahmachari (1968), Aya Sawan Jhoom Ke (1969) and Aradhana.

=== 1970s ===
In the 1970s he had successes including Pehchan (1970), Aan Milo Sajna (1970), Caravan (1971), Be-Imaan (1972) Dost (1974), Khel Khel Mein (1975), Hum Kisise Kum Naheen (1977), Gol Maal (1979).

=== 1980s ===
His films in the 1980s include Karz (1980), Do Aur Do Paanch (1980), Bemisal (1982), Zamaane Ko Dikhana Hai (1981), Nastik (1983), Andar Baahar (1984), Saaheb (1985) and Karma (1986). He also co-wrote the Tamil comedy movie Thillu Mullu (1981), a remake of his own film Gol Maal.

=== 1990s ===
He continued in the 1990s with hits including Main Khiladi Tu Anari (1994), Yeh Dillagi (1994), Karan Arjun (1995), Koyla (1997), Soldier (1998), Aa Ab Laut Chalen (1999) and Taal (1999) and Keemat -They are back (1998).

=== 2000s ===
In the 2000s, he has continued with the hits Koi Mil Gaya, Kisna and Krrish (2006).

== Direction ==
He directed only one film, starring Rajesh Khanna and Sharmila Tagore Raja Rani in 1973, which was also written by him. The film was box office hit and adjusting for inflation as of 2014, its business in 1973 would be equivalent to 100 crores in 2014.

== Personal life ==
He married and later divorced actress Kalpana. In 1971 he married again. He was married to the daughter of the musician DM Tagore, her name being Bansari Bhaumick and soon after they had a son Sandeep Bhaumick.

In 2003 Bhaumick filed a defamation case against Barbara Taylor Bradford after she had sued him for copyright infringement regarding a TV soap opera.

== Filmography ==
Director

- Raja Rani (1973)

Writer

- Lajwanti (1958)
- Anuradha (1960)
- Chhaya (1961)
- Ayee Milan Ki Bela (1964)
- Ziddi (1964)
- Jaanwar (1965)
- Love in Tokyo (1966)
- Aaye Din Bahar Ke (1966)
- An Evening in Paris (1967)
- Bhramachari (1968)
- Aya Sawan Jhoom Ke (1969)
- Aradhana (1969)
- Ek Shrimaan Ek Shrimati (1969)
- Enga Mama (1970) - story only; Tamil language feature film remake of Bhramachari (1968)
- Aan Milo Sajna (1970)
- Pehchaan (1970)
- Caravan (1971)
- Be-Imaan (1972)
- Dost (1974)
- En Magan (1974) - story only; Tamil language feature film remake of Be-Imaan
- Khel Khel Mein (1975)
- Warrant (1975)
- Zindagi (1976)
- Hum Kisise Kum Naheen (1977)
- Azaad (1978)
- Trishna (1978)
- Gol Maal (1979)
- Karz (1980)
- Do Aur Do Paanch (1980)
- Bemisal (1982)
- Zamaane Ko Dikhana Hai (1981)
- Bemisal (1982)
- Nastik (1983)
- Kissi Se Na Kehna (1983)
- Andar Baahar (1984)
- Manzil Manzil (1984)
- Saaheb (1985)
- Faasle (1985)
- Jhoothi (1985)
- Zabardast (1985)
- Karma (1986)
- Vijay (1988)
- Kanoon Apna Apna (1989)
- Aag Se Khelenge (1989)
- Saudagar (1991)
- Pratigyabadh (1991)
- Bewafa Sanam (1993)
- Khal-Naaikaa (1993)
- Ikke Pe Ikka (1994)
- Main Khiladi Tu Anari (1994)
- Amaanat (1994)
- Yeh Dillagi (1994)
- Karan Arjun (1995)
- Daraar (1996)
- Dastak (1996; script doctoring)
- Koyla (1997)
- Soldier (1998)
- Achanak (1998)
- Dushman (1998)
- Aunty No. 1 (1998)
- Aa Ab Laut Chalen (1999)
- Taal (1999)
- Karobaar: The Business of Love (2000)
- Koi Mil Gaya (2003)
- Krrish (2006)

== Awards and nominations ==
- 1968 Filmfare Best Story Award for Brahmachari
- 1969 Filmfare Nomination for Best Story for Aradhana
- 1970 Filmfare Nomination for Best Story for Pehchan

== Associations ==
Has worked for several films for each of the following producers/directors:

- J. Om Prakash
- Subhash Ghai
- Rakesh Roshan
- Nasir Hussain
- Hrishikesh Mukherjee
- Pramod Chakravorty
