= Pramod Chakravorty =

Indian film producer and director (1929-2004)

- Born: Pramod Chakravorty; 15 August 1929; Calcutta, West Bengal, British Raj
- Died: 12 December 2004 (aged 75); Mumbai, Maharashtra, India
- Occupations: Film director; film producer
- Years active: 1955–1998

Pramod Chakravorty (15 August 1929 – 12 December 2004) was an Indian Hindi film producer and director.

== Career ==
Chakravorty is best known for directing Hindi film classics like Ziddi, Love in Tokyo, Tumse Achcha Kaun Hai in romantic genre and action films like Jugnu (1973), Jagir and Shatru. He also directed suspense films like 12 O Clock with Guru Dutt and Johnny Walker and also directed thriller like Passport with Madhubala and Pradeep Kumar in lead roles. He directed Dharmendra and Hema Malini as the romantic pair in the films Jugnu, Naya Zamana, Dream Girl and Azaad. In 1976, he had started shooting the film Chamatkar with Rajesh Khanna, Parveen Babi and Shoma Anand in lead roles but the film after being shot for 45 per cent, was stopped mid way by other producers. Later he got opportunity to direct Rajesh Khanna with Shabana in the Indo Bangladesh venture Shatru (1986). He also directed Dev Anand and Zeenat Aman in Warrant in 1975. He is the director who first signed Akshay Kumar as lead hero with Deedar even though Saugandh was Akshay's first release. Actor Pran was a regular in the films directed by Pramod Chakravorthy.

== Filmography as director ==
- 12 O'Clock (1958)
- Sanjog (1961)
- Passport (1961)
- Ziddi (1964)
- Love in Tokyo (1966)
- Tumse Achha Kaun Hai (1969)
- Naya Zamana (1971)
- Jugnu (1973)
- Warrant (1975)
- Barood (1976)
- Dream Girl (1977)
- Azaad (1978)
- Jyoti (1981)
- Nastik (1983)
- Teen Murti (1984)
- Jagir (1984) (Hindi version of Teen Murti)
- Shatru (1986)
- Deedar (1992)
- Barood (1998)

== See also ==
- Bollywood
- R.D. Burman
- Shankar Jaikishan
