= Conversations with Waheeda Rehman =

Biography by Nasreen Munni Kabir

- Author: Nasreen Munni Kabir
- Language: English
- Subject: Waheeda Rehman
- Genre: Biography
- Published: 19 February 2014
- Publisher: Penguin Books
- Publication place: India
- Media type: Print
- Pages: 256
- ISBN: 978-06-70086-92-4

Conversations with Waheeda Rehman is a biography by the producer of television documentaries and author Nasreen Munni Kabir, documenting Kabir's extensive conversations with the actress Waheeda Rehman about the actress' life and career. The biography details Rehman's birth in 1938 in Chingleput (present-day Chengalpattu), her 54-year-long film career, and her 1974 marriage to the actor Kamaljeet, with whom she has two children. It was published on 19 February 2014 by Penguin Books. The book generated positive reviews from book critics; most of the praise was directed towards the book's question-and-answer format, and Kabir's and Rehman's style in questioning and answering, respectively.

In 1988, Kabir met Rehman while researching on Guru Dutt's life. She met Rehman—his then frequent collaborator—to find more information about him for a documentary releasing the next year, In Search of Guru Dutt. During these interactions, Kabir conceived the idea to write a book on the actress which later became Conversations with Waheeda Rehman. Over the next decades, Kabir tried persuading Rehman to get involved in the book but was always rejected since Rehman believed her life was not interesting enough. While Kabir was nearly about to give up of the project, Rehman finally agreed to do so in 2012. Writing took place in Bandra from December 2012 to November 2013.

== Summary ==
The book begins with Waheeda Rehman telling Nasreen Munni Kabir about her early life and work. It includes her birth in 1938 in Chingleput (now Chengalpattu), her father Mohammed Abdur Rehman's death in 1951, and her appearance in the song "Eruvaaka Sagaroranno Chinnanna" from the Telugu-language film Rojulu Marayi (1955). The book later details how she got the opportunity, the shooting, and the song's popularity. Its success led a first meeting between her and the filmmaker Guru Dutt, who would become her frequent collaborator. The two subsequently played starring roles in the romantic films Pyaasa (1957), Kaagaz Ke Phool (1959), Chaudhvin Ka Chand (1960), and Sahib Bibi Aur Ghulam (1962)—she was nominated for the Filmfare Award for Best Supporting Actress for the first and last of these. After Sahib Bibi Aur Ghulam, she stopped collaborating with him and later starred in Guide (1965) and Neel Kamal (1968), both of which won her two Best Actress trophies at Filmfare. Rehman married to the actor Kamaljeet in 1974 and had two children. The book ends with information of her latest release, Delhi-6 (2009), in which she portrayed a grandmother.

== Development and writing ==
Kabir was researching for Dutt's life, which resulted in two books—Guru Dutt: A Life in Cinema (1996) and Yours Guru Dutt (2006)—and the documentary In Search of Guru Dutt (1989), when she had a desire to meet Rehman for the first time. According to Kabir, Rehman was an important part in the research regarding Dutt, as she had collaborated with him in most films he made. In 1987, having returned from London, Kabir went to Bombay (now Mumbai) and attempted many failed calls to Rehman through her telephone. When Rehman finally responded in mid-1988, Kabir explained about the documentary she would make and Rehman agreed to hold a meeting with her. In Conversations with Waheeda Rehman's foreword, Kabir stated that Rehman, however, was initially reluctant about the project, since documentaries on Indian film personalities were rare at the time.

Cinema is seductive; you see a film that is entertaining and you think it is great. But will you continue to think so 10 years later? You need time and reflection. And Waheedaji is just like Lata Mangeshkar or Gulzar, Javed Akhtar or A. R. Rahman ... These are people who have the most to tell; the people I am interested in.

— Nasreen Munni Kabir on the idea of Conversations with Waheeda Rehman

Soon, Kabir arrived in Rehman's apartment in Bandra. She wrote of her experience, "When Waheeda Rehman opened the door, I was overwhelmed by images of her lifelike screen character ... [She] has had such an emotional impact of us all that it took a few minutes for the sheer excitement to settle." Kabir said that the purpose was to find more information on Dutt and an interview of hers would be featured in the documentary. Rehman spoke of her days with the filmmaker enthusiastically. Kabir met Rehman once more in 1990 for a documentary on the playback singer Lata Mangeshkar. Fifteen years later, she asked Rehman if she could write a book about her life, but the idea was later disapproved by the actress, thinking that it would not be interesting.

Kabir kept trying to persuade Rehman and, in 2012, she finally gave her permission while the two were having meal at an Iranian restaurant in Edgware Road, London, telling her: "Maine kaafi taal diya, Nasreen ko" ("I have postponed it too many times, Nasreen"). The author sent copies for her Lata Mangeshkar ...in Her Own Voice (2009) and In the Company of a Poet (2012), so Rehman could know what book they would do. The conversations took place from December 2012 to November 2013 in Bandra, with more than twenty-five meetings and a two-hour duration for each sessions. Kabir noted Rehman's strong memory, adding, "... her insight into the craft of film-making shows a keen and alert intelligence." The material—in Hindustani and English—were recorded on her MacBook Pro and later transcribed. Conversations with Waheeda Rehman was announced by the Mumbai Mirror in 2013.

== Critical reception ==
Critics received the book positively. Bollywood Hungama gave it three stars, writing that it chronicles well enough Rehman's journey from being a dancer in item numbers to an established actress. However, the critic was disappointed as the book mostly details her collaboration with Dutt only and lacks of information about her personal life. Reviewing for India Today, Sharla Bazliel agreed its content primarily describes her works with Dutt, but praised Rehman for her honest and humorous speaking style. Rajeev Masand described it as a free-flowing question-and-answer biography and "an engaging and revealing account of her times". While suggesting Kabir to add more pictures of Rehman, Ramya Sarma from The Hindu wrote a positive review, stating that "she [Rehman] is not just a treasure that Indian cinemagoers have been fortunate enough to watch on screen, but from her conversations, a delightful person to know with a memory that is rich and varied ... " Saba Shabbir, who did a review for Dawn, referred to the book as "candid, real, and personal", and praised its vivid details on Rehman's life and career.

Saibal Chatterjee noted in his review for the magazine Tehelka that the book is a "befitting document of a glorious career", explaining that it is "as much a tribute to the eventful life of an exceptional actress as it is a lucid record of a period of moviemaking that set the bar so extraordinarily high that it has rarely been touched since." Scroll.in's Gautam Chintamani concluded the book is a "fascinating insight into ... one of Indian cinema's all-time greats ... and the greatest period of Hindi cinema". Vikas Datta of the Indo-Asian News Service wrote Conversations with Waheeda Rehman is not a biography nor an autobiography, "but goes far beyond their limitations to provide a fairly comprehensive account of a remarkable actress whose ethereal beauty has lit the screen in the many unforgettable roles she has essayed—but always on her terms." Datta felt the book was easy to read as well and appreciated Kabir's effort to collect Rehman's rare photographs. Calling it "a valuable addition to film lovers", Pallab Bhattacharya of The Daily Star, a newspaper based in Bangladesh, acclaimed the book for its "refreshing" format and revealing much unknown information of the subject. The Free Press Journal's P. P. Ramachandran said, "A slice of cinema history told through compelling anecdotes and observations, it provides a rare glimpse of the real Waheeda."

Sidharth Bhatia of The Pioneer stated that Rehman was often associated with Dutt before the latter's death in 1964, and believed that it was the main reason why Kabir made the book partially focuses on their professional life. Bhatia took note of Kabir's gentle and understandable questioning style, claiming that those made the conversations were not boring and convoluted. In a review in The Tribune, Aradhika Sharma likened reading the book with looking at an old family album with pictures of familiar family members. Outlook's Sathya Saran praised Kabir to be the only biographer who succeeded to make Rehman agreed for being interviewed, and Shubhra Gupta from The Indian Express labelled the book as an "intimate yet lively" work about her. Vivek Tejuja of News18 mentioned that the conversations was done clearly, candidly, and politely. In The New Indian Express, Indrajit Hazra elaborated, "To hear her speak in this book can only force us to rewatch the Waheeda Rehman that still holds us in a trance." In her end-year column for the Hindustan Times, Saudamini Jain declared it as "the first book about one of Bollywood's most beautiful actresses ever".

== Publication history ==
Region	Release date	Language	Format	Publisher	Ref.
India	19 February 2014	English	Hardcover	Penguin Books	
India	15 March 2015	English	Paperback	Penguin Books	
India	15 March 2015	English	Amazon Kindle	Penguin Books	
India	1 July 2015	Marathi	Paperback	Rohan Prakashan	

== Sources ==
- Bamzai, Kaveree (23 January 2006). "Cinema paradiso". India Today. Archived from the original on 6 July 2021.
- Bazliel, Sharla (31 March 2014). "Sharla Bazliel reviews conversation with Waheeda Rehman by Nasreen Munni Kabir". India Today. Archived from the original on 22 June 2021.
- Bhattacharya, Pallab (12 May 2014). "Greatness wrapped in humility". The Daily Star. Archived from the original on 15 May 2014.
- Bhatia, Sidharth (27 April 2014). "Confluence of portrayals". The Pioneer. Archived from the original on 23 June 2021.
- "Book review – Conversations with Waheeda Rehman". Bollywood Hungama. 4 August 2014. Archived from the original on 7 April 2019.
- Chatterjee, Saibal (18 April 2014). "The Chosen One". Tehelka. Archived from the original on 22 June 2021.
- Chintamani, Gautam (30 November 2014). "Star biographies: can a film-star's life be an open book?". Scroll.in. Archived from the original on 3 May 2021.
- Datta, Vikas (9 April 2014). "'Conversations With Waheeda Rehman': The endearing story of a remarkable actress (Book Review)". Business Standard. Indo-Asian News Service. Archived from the original on 9 March 2021.
- Ghose, Anindita (23 June 2014). "The backstory of Waheeda Rehman's biography". Vogue India. Archived from the original on 13 July 2014.
- Gupta, Shubhra (26 April 2014). "Rosie Remembers". The Indian Express. Archived from the original on 24 July 2014.
- Hazra, Indrajit (11 May 2014). "Dialogues with a Cinematic Diva". The New Indian Express. Archived from the original on 2 July 2021.
- Jain, Saudamini (28 December 2014). "Looking back at 2014 in books". Hindustan Times. Archived from the original on 26 July 2017.
- Kabir, Nasreen Munni (19 February 2014). Conversations with Waheeda Rehman. New Delhi, India: Penguin Books. ISBN 978-06-70086-92-4.
- Kabir, Nasreen Munni (15 March 2015). Conversations with Waheeda Rehman. New Delhi, India: Penguin Books. ISBN 978-01-43424-03-1.
- Kabir, Nasreen Munni (15 March 2015). Conversations with Waheeda Rehman. New Delhi, India: Penguin Books. ASIN B06XYQ2YWR.
- Kabir, Nasreen Munni (1 July 2015). Waheeda Rehman: Hitagujatun Ulagadleli (in Marathi). Translated by Champanerkar, Milind. Rohan Prakashan. ISBN 978-93-82591-69-6.
- Lalwani, Vickey (11 October 2013). "Nasreen Munni Kabir to pen Waheeda's story". Mumbai Mirror. Archived from the original on 23 June 2021.
- Masand, Rajeev (24 March 2014). "Waheeda Rehman: "Dev Anand was always a decent flirt"". RajeevMasand.com. Archived from the original on 2 July 2021.
- Ramachandran, P. P. (22 June 2014). "Conversations with Waheeda Rehman". The Free Press Journal. Archived from the original on 22 June 2021.
- Ramnath, Nandini (29 March 2014). "Nasreen Munni Kabir | My biggest problem is, who next?". Mint. Archived from the original on 2 October 2019.
- Saran, Sathya (28 April 2014). "Mirror On A Full Moon". Outlook. Archived from the original on 12 March 2018.
- Sarma, Ramya (12 April 2014). "Looking back at a lifetime". The Hindu. Archived from the original on 24 June 2014.
- Sarma, Ramya (14 April 2014). "Down memory lane with a soulful actor". The Hindu. Archived from the original on 21 April 2014.
- Singh, Jai Arjun (8 April 2014). "Stillness and tehzeeb: Nasreen Munni Kabir on Waheeda Rehman". Jabberwock. Archived from the original on 25 March 2017.
- Shabbir, Saba (17 August 2014). "Review: Conversations with Waheeda Rehman by Nasreen Munni Kabir". Dawn. Archived from the original on 7 October 2014.
- Sharma, Aradhika (29 June 2014). "The mettle of a true star". The Tribune. Archived from the original on 7 July 2014.
- Usman, Yasser (5 December 2014). Rajesh Khanna: The Untold Story of India's First Superstar. Gurgaon, India: Penguin Books. ISBN 978-9-351-18875-9.
- Usman, Yasser (7 January 2021). Guru Dutt: An Unfinished Story. Noida, India: Simon & Schuster. ISBN 978-93-86797-89-6.
- Tejuja, Vivek (28 March 2014). "'Conversations with Waheeda Rehman': You will be left thinking about it". News18. Archived from the original on 22 June 2021.
