= Guru Dutt team =

Group of Indian filmmakers

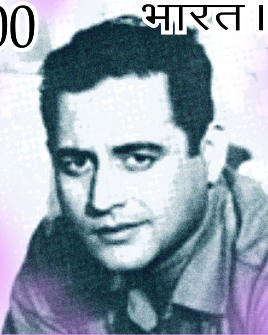
Dutt spearheaded the "Guru Dutt Team"

The Guru Dutt team was a group of filmmakers formed by Guru Dutt for some of his works. Some well-known films that the team created include Chaudhvin Ka Chand, Sahib Bibi Aur Ghulam, Kaagaz Ke Phool, and Pyaasa. In 2005 Pyaasa was ranked among the top 100 movies by Time magazine.

Much of their work found critical appreciation long after these movies were made. Movies such as Kaagaz Ke Phool, which was a huge commercial failure of its days, found critical and commercial success when it was re-released in the 1980s in Europe. Dutt has a huge following in France, Germany, and Japan, where his movie festivals are held occasionally.

== The team ==
- Writer: Abrar Alvi
- Directorial: Raj Khosla, Abrar Alvi
- Cinematography: V. K. Murthy
- Actors: Dev Anand, Waheeda Rehman, Johnny Walker, Rehman
- Singer: Geeta Dutt, Mohammad Rafi
- Music: O. P. Nayyar, S.D. Burman, Hemant Kumar
- Lyrics: Sahir Ludhianvi, Kaifi Azmi, Majrooh Sultanpuri
- Editor: Y.G. Chawhan
- Art director: Biren Nag (worked as art director on five of Dutt's films)

== Notable works ==
The following are notable films from Dutt's career:

- Baazi (1951)
- Jaal (1952)
- Baaz (1953)
- Aar Paar (1954)
- Mr. & Mrs. '55 (1955)
- C.I.D. (1956)
- Pyaasa (1957)
- Kaagaz Ke Phool (1959)
- Chaudhvin Ka Chand (1960)
- Sahib Bibi Aur Ghulam (1962): National Film Awards for Best Feature Film in Hindi; Filmfare Awards for Best Movie, Best Director, Best Cinematographer, Best Actress
- Baharen Phir Bhi Aayengi (1966) - Released posthumously from Guru Dutt

== After Dutt's death ==
The team stopped working together after Dutt's death at 39.

After his death, only a few of the members were able to achieve the critical acclaim they did as a team. Partly the reason was Guru Dutt's eye for detail. Pyaasa and Kaagaz Ke Phool are an inspiration for directors even today. The exceptions were Dev Anand, S.D. Burman, Sahir Ludhianvi, Hemant Kumar, and Mohammad Rafi, who were already established when Guru Dutt entered film making. Waheeda Rehman is also an exception, as she performed par excellence in her coming films like Teesri Kasam, Bees Saal Baad, Reshma Aur Shera, Khamoshi and her magnum opus Guide. V. K. Murthy continued work with Promod Chakravarthy but his notable work was in Tamas (1987), directed by his erstwhile assistant Govind Nihalani.

== See also ==
- Guru Dutt Films

== Bibliography ==
- Guru Dutt, 1925-1965: A Monograph, by Firoze Rangoonwalla, National Film Archive of India, Govt. of India, 1973.
- Guru Dutt, un grand cinéaste encore pratiquement inconnu hors de l'Inde, by Henri Micciollo, Films sans Frontières, 1984.
- Guru Dutt: A Life in Cinema, by Nasreen Munni Kabir, Oxford University Press, 1997, ISBN 0-19-564274-0.
- In Black and White: Hollywood and the Melodrama of Guru Dutt, by Darius Cooper, Seagull Books, 2005. ISBN 81-7046-217-7.
- Yours Guru Dutt: Intimate Letters of a Great Indian Filmmaker, by Nasreen Munni Kabir, Lustre Press, Roli Books, 2006. ISBN 81-7436-388-2.
- Ten Years with Guru Dutt: Abrar Alvi's journey, by Sathya Saran. 2008, Penguin, ISBN 0-670-08221-X.
