= Sahib Bibi Aur Ghulam =

1962 film by Abrar Alvi

- Theatrical release poster
- Directed by: Abrar Alvi; Guru Dutt (songs)
- Based on: Saheb Bibi Golam (1956 film) (Bengali)
- Screenplay by: Abrar Alvi; Bimal Mitra
- Produced by: Guru Dutt
- Starring: Meena Kumari; Guru Dutt; Rehman; Waheeda Rehman
- Cinematography: V. K. Murthy
- Edited by: Y. G. Chawhan
- Music by: Hemant Kumar; Shakeel Badayuni (film song lyrics)
- Production company: Guru Dutt Movies Pvt. Ltd.
- Release date: 29 July 1962
- Running time: 152 minutes
- Country: India
- Language: Hindi
- Box office: ₹8.4 million

Sahib Bibi Aur Ghulam (transl. The Master, the Wife, and the Slave) is a 1962 Indian Hindi-language drama film directed by Abrar Alvi, produced & co–directed by Guru Dutt, who also co-stars in it alongside Meena Kumari, Rehman, and Waheeda Rehman. It is a remake of the 1956 Bengali film Saheb Bibi Golam, which itself is based on Bimal Mitra's 1953 novel of the same name. It is set in the 19th century during the British Raj and focuses on Bhoothnath (Dutt), who meets Chhoti Bahu (Kumari), the lonely wife of a zamindar (Rehman). The film follows Chhoti Bahu's effort to keep her husband—who likes drinking and watching tawaifs perform—at their home by drinking with him. She becomes addicted to alcohol, leading both of them into bankruptcy.

The book's rights were bought after his production venture Chaudhvin Ka Chand (1960) became commercially successful and covered his company's loss following the failure of Kaagaz Ke Phool (1959), his previous directorial project. Mitra and Alvi took a year to write the screenplay, facing difficulties in translating the novel from Bengali to Hindi. Principal photography took place in Andheri and Dhanyakuria with cinematographer V. K. Murthy; the film was edited by Y. G. Chawhan. Hemant Kumar composed the soundtrack and Shakeel Badayuni wrote the lyrics.

Sahib Bibi Aur Ghulam was released on 29 July 1962. Although it commercially failed with a gross of ₹8.4 million (US$87,000), it garnered positive responses from critics; most appreciation was given to the cast's performances, particularly that of Kumari, and Murthy's cinematography. Sahib Bibi Aur Ghulam won four Filmfare Awards, including Best Film, Best Director for Alvi, and Best Actress for Kumari. It also received the National Film Award for Best Feature Film in Hindi and the Bengal Film Journalists' Association Award for Sixth Best Indian Film, and Alvi was awarded the Best Director trophy at the latter function. The film was chosen as the Indian submission for the Academy Award for Best Foreign Language Film but it was not nominated.

Sahib Bibi Aur Ghulam became a milestone of Bollywood and is considered among the most important films in Dutt's career. In 2012, its screenplay was published as a book titled Sahib Bibi Aur Ghulam: The Original Screenplay, which also contains interviews with the film's cast and crew. On the centenary of Indian cinema in 2013, IBN Live included Sahib Bibi Aur Ghulam in their listing of "100 Greatest Indian Films of All Time".

== Plot ==
In Calcutta, a group of labourers is demolishing the ruins of an old haveli. When the workers break for lunch, the overseer walks around the site. As he sits, a flashback to the late 19th century begins.

The lower-class yet educated Atulya "Bhoothnath" Chakraborty arrives in the colonial Calcutta looking for work. Along with his brother-in-law, he lives in the haveli of the Choudhury zamindar family. Bhoothnath meets Subinay, a dedicated member of the religious sect Brahmo Samaj, and the owner of the factory Mohini Sindoor. Subinay's daughter Jabba hears their conversation and is amused by the behaviour of Bhoothnath, whom she considers an unsophisticated rural dweller. Over time, the two develop an attraction to each other. Bhoothnath becomes fascinated with the goings-on in the haveli and every night he observes the Choudhury brothers' decadent lifestyle.

One night, Bansi, another servant at the haveli, introduces Bhoothnath to the younger zamindar’s wife, Chhoti Bahu. She pleads with him to bring her some Mohini sindoor, believing it will help mend her strained marriage to Chhote Babu, who spends most of his time with a dancing girl. Moved by her sorrow, Bhoothnath unintentionally becomes her secret confidant. When her efforts to win back her husband’s affection fail, she begins drinking with him in a bid to keep him close.

In the meanwhile, Subinay falls ill and closes the factory as he is unable to manage it due to his ill health. He also fixes Jabba's marriage to Supavitra, who is also a Brahmo Samaj member. Learning about this, a heartbroken Bhoothnath leaves from there. He becomes a trainee architect and is assigned to work on a project in a different town.

A few months later, he comes back to enquire on his mentor Subinay's health, and learns that he has succumbed to his illness. After the death of Subinay, Jabba breaks her engagement to Supavitra. Bhoothnath also discovers that long ago he and Jabba were betrothed as children.

When Bhootnath visits the haveli, he sees it has been partially ruined and the Choudhurys have fallen on bad times. Chhoti Bahu is now a desperate alcoholic and her husband is paralysed. He chastises her on her drinking and they have an argument. Their conversation is overheard by the elder zamindar Majhle Babu, who suspects Chhoti Bahu is having an affair with Bhoothnath.

One night, when Chhoti Bahu asks Bhoothnath to accompany her to a nearby shrine to pray for her husband; Majhle Babu orders his henchmen to chase them. Bhoothnath and Chhoti Bahu travel in a carriage, but Majhle Babu's henchmen stop it. Bhoothnath is knocked unconscious and Chhoti Bahu is abducted. When he wakes up in the hospital, Bansi tells Bhoothnath that Chhoti Bahu has disappeared and her husband is dead.

The flashback ends. Bhoothnath's workers inform him a skeleton has been found in the ruins of the haveli. From the jewellery on the corpse, Bhoothnath realises it is the remains of Chhoti Bahu. In the last scene, a nostalgic Bhoothnath rides away in a carriage with Jabba, who is now his wife.

== Cast ==
The cast is listed below:

- Meena Kumari as Chhoti Bahu
- Guru Dutt as Atulya "Bhoothnath" Chakraborty
- Rehman as Chhote Babu
- Waheeda Rehman as Jaba
- D. K. Sapru as Majhle Babu
- Harindranath Chattopadhyay as Ghari Babu
- Pratima Devi as Badi Bahu
- S. N. Banerjee as a tanga driver
- Nazir Hussain as Subinay Babu
- Dhumal as Bansi
- Minoo Mumtaz as dancer in the song "Saakiya Aaj Mujhe"
- Chanda Kalrani as Chinta, Chhoti Bahu's maid

== Production ==
=== Development ===
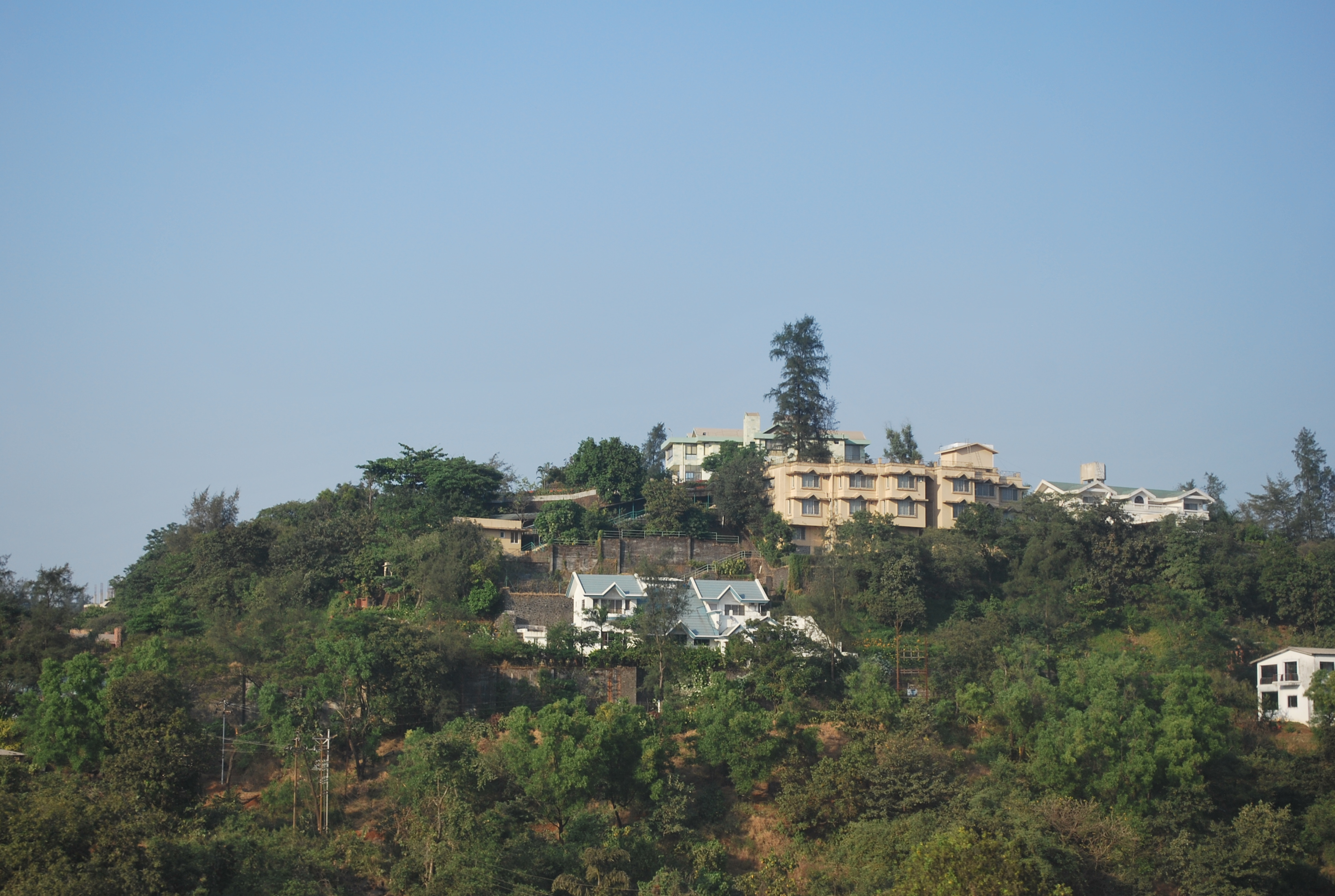
A bungalow in Khandala was rented by Guru Dutt for the screenplay writing

Guru Dutt wanted to adapt Bimal Mitra's novel Saheb Bibi Golam (1953) into a film after reading it and watching its staged version at Rang Mahal Theatre, Calcutta, with his wife Geeta, Mitra, and Abrar Alvi. This marked the novel's second cinematic adaptation after the 1956 version. The novel was written in and never translated from Bengali. Dutt asked Alvi to write a screenplay; according to Alvi, he was surprised Dutt gave him the offer because Dutt had previously discharged him from his company Guru Dutt Movies Pvt. Ltd. after Dutt's Kaagaz Ke Phool (1959), in which Alvi served as the screenwriter, became a flop and he could not pay his workers. Since then, Dutt decided not to direct any films he worked on. After his next release Chaudhvin Ka Chand (1960) commercially succeeded, he was able to save the studio from bankruptcy and later acquired the rights of Saheb Bibi Golam. Dutt and Alvi started translating the novel to Hindi but Alvi was not fluent in Bengali. They tried translating it word-for-word but realised the process would be really slow and stopped after a few days.

Dutt invited Mitra, who lived in Calcutta, to visit him at a bungalow Dutt rented in Khandala. Alvi said Dutt was thorough on any aspects of his projects and that the bungalow was used to ensure both Mitra and Alvi concentrated on writing the screenplay. After arriving in Khandala, Mitra and Alvi invited a "Mr. Mukherjee", who was fluent in Bengali and Hindi, to be a "bridge between us". The translator, however, gave up after fifteen days, asking them to do the rest by themselves. Alvi said the screenplay was written "slowly but surely"; he and Mitra made many changes to the story so the film would be fit with Hindi audience's interest. For instance, they removed several characters who appear in the novel version, including Swami Vivekananda, and made Bhoothnath more naïve and less educated. Dutt's biographer Nasreen Munni Kabir estimated the translating took two months and said Dutt, who was impressed by the screenplay, suggested Alvi to direct the film. Yasser Usman reported it was the first time the screenplay of a film Dutt produced was finished before filming began. In preparation, Alvi was sent to Calcutta to learn about the Bengali milieu and the zamindars' background.

=== Casting ===
Dutt and Alvi completed the casting; their first choice to play Bhoothnath was Shashi Kapoor, who was invited for a meeting with Dutt but he arrived two-and-a-half hours late, which irritated Dutt, who then declined to cast him. Biswajit Chatterjee, who portrayed Bhoothnath in the play, became Dutt's next choice; he and Chatterjee had dinner at the Grand Hotel to discuss it. The film was to be Chatterjee's Bollywood debut but his friends and fans informed him his popularity among Bengali people was increasing, so he reluctantly rejected the offer, a decision he later regretted. The role was eventually played by Dutt, who had to shave his moustache to make him look younger.

Chhaya Arya, the wife of the photographer Jitendra Arya, was suggested to portray Chhoti Bahu. Living in London, the film's production team asked her to move to Bombay (now Mumbai). In October 1960, she arrived there for a photograph session. When seeing the results, Dutt felt she was not too wanton- or motherly-looking for the role. He searched for a more suitable female actor and chose Meena Kumari for the role. (Note: According to Sahib Bibi Aur Ghulam's director and writer Abrar Alvi, Chhaya Arya was cast first by Guru Dutt to play the role of Chhoti Bahu and then Meena Kumari was chosen as her substitute. Mohan Deep and Vinod Mehta, both of whom have published biographical books about Kumari, wrote she was Dutt's first choice for the film; after Kumari's husband Kamal Amrohi showed disapproval of the role, Arya was suggested, and Kumari was again chosen after Arya opted out.) In 1953, Kumari lost the opportunity to be cast for a role in Devdas (1955), which was eventually given to Suchitra Sen, Kumari's husband Kamal Amrohi refused his offers, feeling Chhoti Bahu had a negative reputation; he asked for ₹600,000 (US$6,200) but Dutt could pay ₹200,000 (US$2,100) only. Kumari persuaded Dutt she was the only actor who was capable of playing the role and, by 1962, she finally got the role. Alvi said Kumari was entranced by the film's themes and saw the role had the potential to boost her career.

The film marked the sixth collaboration between Waheeda Rehman and Dutt. In Sahib Bibi Aur Ghulam, Waheeda Rehman stars as the "couldn't-care-less carefree" Jabba. After reading the novel, she wanted to play Chhoti Bahu but Dutt felt she was too young for that role, saying she looked more like a girl than a woman. Still insisting, she asked Dutt and the film's cinematographer V. K. Murthy for a photograph session in which she would dress up as Chhoti Bahu, wearing a Bengali sari and a tilaka. After looking at the photographs, Murthy agreed with Dutt and likened her to a child. When Alvi was appointed to direct the film, he called in Waheeda Rehman was and offered her the part of Jabba. Dutt disapproved of this casting because she was an established actress and he did not want her cast as the second female lead after Kumari. According to Dutt, the film's title represents its three leads; Sahib for Rehman, Bibi for Kumari, and Ghulam for Dutt, but these excluded Waheeda Rehman. She, however, told Dutt she was fine by it.

=== Filming ===
Principal photography for Sahib Bibi Aur Ghulam took place in Andheri and a forty-to-fifty-room haveli in Dhanyakuria. It started on 1 January 1961 with a muhurat ceremony that was attended by the film's production team. The cinematographer was Murthy and the sets were designed by Biren Nag. Bhanu Athaiya, who knew little about Bengali people and their looks, designed the costumes; Dutt sent her to Calcutta to prepare for filming. According to Usman, Athaiya was also involved in the film's directing, especially that of the song sequences, though only Alvi's name appears in the credits.

Filming, except for the scenes that feature Chhoti Bahu, was almost completed by the beginning of 1962; filming was completed with a 45-consecutive-day schedule in Andheri. There are no scenes of Chhoti Bahu and Jabba together; Waheeda Rehman wanted to act with Kumari so she asked Dutt to rework the story. She suggested a scene in which Jabba persistently asks Bhootnath about Chhoti Bahu and he later takes her to the haveli. Dutt, however, dismissed the idea, saying the characters never meet in the novel and that the audience would not be interested by it. After filming, P. Thackersey and Y. G. Chawhan handled the sound and editing, respectively.

== Soundtrack ==
The soundtrack—released by Saregama—was composed by Hemant Kumar, Shakeel Badayuni wrote the lyrics, and Geeta and Asha Bhosle sang vocals. Dutt directed the songs but Alvi replaced him while he was absent from the sets during the filming of "Bhanwara Bada Nadan". Dutt watched the result ten times but felt disappointed and re-filmed it by adding comedic elements. After the film's release, Dutt cut the song "Sahil Ki Taraf" from the climax, in which Chhoti Bahu rests her head on Bhoothnath's lap because the audience criticised it. Kumar reused the song for "Ya Dil Ki Suno Duniyawalo" for the 1966 film Anupama.

Sahib Bibi Aur Ghulam (Original Motion Picture Soundtrack)
No.	Title	Singer(s)	Length
1.	"Meri Baat Rahi Meri Man Men"	Asha Bhosle	4:10
2.	"Meri Jaan O Meri Jaan"	Asha Bhosle	3:38
3.	"Sakhiya Aaj Mujhe Neend Nahin"	Asha Bhosle	5:46
4.	"Sahib Bibi Aur Ghulam Theme" (Instrumental)		3:03
5.	"Bhanwara Bada Nadan"	Asha Bhosle	4:29
6.	"Chale Aao Chale Aao"	Geeta Dutt	1:43
7.	"Na Jao Saiyan Chhuda Ke Baiyan" (Raga Pilu)	Geeta Dutt	4:07
8.	"Piya Aiso Jiya Men Samaya Gao"	Geeta Dutt	4:15
Total length:			31:11

== Release and reception ==
=== Release ===
Posters for Sahib Bibi Aur Ghulam were printed by Dutt and Alvi. When the film was released on 29 July 1962, the initial audience response was negative. A day after its premiere, Dutt went to Bombay's Minerva Cinema and observed audiences were disappointed by the scene in which Chhoti Bahu asks for a last sip of alcohol and the song "Sahil Ki Taraf" that made the relationship between Chhoti Bahu and Bhoothnath ambiguous. He visited the director K. Asif's house and was suggested to make Chhoti Bahu recover from her addiction and her marital relationship improve. Dutt asked Alvi and Mitra to write a new climax and invited Kumari for another day's filming. The next day, while they were discussing the unexpected changes, Dutt decided to maintain it, and instead removed the Chhoti Bahu scene and "Sahil Ki Taraf", saying he did not mind if the film became a box-office disappointment. He added it was not possible to create another scene because the changes would the audience would be confused about the film's plot.

Exact figures for the film's box-office earnings are not available. Firoze Rangoonwala, in the 1973 book Guru Dutt, 1925–1965: A Monograph, reported it performed poorly but better than Kaagaz Ke Phool (1959), while in 2005 Stardust called Sahib Bibi Aur Ghulam an "average grosser". Box Office India estimated its total gross to be ₹8.4 million (US$87,000), supporting Rangoonwala's claim. Sahib Bibi Aur Ghulam was the official submission from India to the 13th Berlin International Film Festival, for which a shorter version was made. On 26 June 1963, Dutt, Kumari, Waheeda Rehman with sister Sayeeda, and Alvi arrived in East Berlin and the screening occurred the next evening. All twenty-five people attending the screening gave a poor response to the film's melodramatic plot, unrelatable themes, and slow screenplay. Sahib Bibi Aur Ghulam received a Golden Bear nomination but lost to the French comedy To Bed or Not to Bed and the Japanese action film Bushido, Samurai Saga (both 1963).

=== Critical response ===
Sahib Bibi Aur Ghulam received positive feedback from both contemporaneous and modern critics, who praised the cast's performances—particularly that of Kumari—the cinematography, the costumes and the art direction. Reviewers panned the way Chhoti Bahu is unconventionally depicted as an alcoholic woman. In a review dated 24 June 1962, a writer for The Times of India said the film is excellent because of its well-written screenplay that makes an effective balance between the characters and emotional sequences, and "provides a neat dramatic pattern". Calling the film "a classic in celluloid", he said it does "a specially successful job" though it is based on Mitra's novel, which the reviewer called untidy and with a wordy writing style. Kabir, who collected Dutt's handwritten letters for a book titled Yours Guru Dutt (2006), reported it is one of few reviews Dutt read during his lifetime.

Vinod Mehta, who biographed Kumari's life in 1972, said Kumari overshadows her co-stars and added; "Gone were the traces of frivolity, gone was the look of undernourishment, gone was the look of the 'girl-next-door'. She was now a woman of sharp, mature, mysterious persona ... whose one smile concealed a thousand enigmas." In her 1985 book Profiles: Five Film-makers from India, Shampa Banerjee complimented Kumari for being the greatest performer in the film. She also found Bhoothnath to be completely different Dutt's previous roles, noting its "rustic simplicity and comic innocence, coupled with a deeply compassionate nature, lent Bhootnath's character an immediate realism, a natural complexity, which justified the keen internal version of the older Bhootnath who recounts the tale". On 19 February 1989, The Illustrated Weekly of India's Khalid Mohamed called Waheeda Rehman's role equal to that of Kumari's and wrote of her importance in the film, even though hers is a supporting role whereas Kumari's is a lead.

Dinesh Raheja, writing for Rediff.com in 2003, called the film "a fascinating mood movie made by people gifted with acute sensitivity". He said Dutt was at his best when playing Bhootnath without his moustache. Raheja, however, was critical of Rehman and said her scenes could be partly removed because her character, which he deemed perky, is less important to the film's main plot. Writing for The Hindu in 2008, A. P. S. Malhotra said Kumari's portrayal of a "career-defining role" is an "awe-inspiring performance". He praised Athaiya's costumes and Murthy's cinematography, stating both are outstanding throughout the film. Anna M. M. Vetticad, in an article published by Firstpost in 2020, said Kumari played her role brilliantly and commended the film's production, including the art direction. In 2021, Sampada Sharma of The Indian Express wrote of Kumari; "Her perpetually melancholic eyes and her pristine beauty make her a tragic figure who is slowly drowning in a sea of despair".

=== Accolades ===
The film won a National Film Award in the category Best Feature Film in Hindi, and at the 10th Filmfare Awards, it won Best Film, Best Director (Alvi), and Best Actress (Kumari). The Film Federation of India chose Sahib Bibi Aur Ghulam to represent India in the Best Foreign Language Film award at the 35th Academy Awards over the Tamil-language romantic drama Nenjil Or Aalayam (1962). Sahib Bibi Aur Ghulam, however, failed to be nominated and the Academy of Motion Picture Arts and Sciences wrote to Dutt telling him according to American culture, it was inappropriate for a woman to be an alcoholic.

Award	Category	Recipient(s) and nominee(s)	Result	Ref(s)
26th Annual BFJA Awards	Best Indian Films (Sixth)	Sahib Bibi Aur Ghulam	Won	
26th Annual BFJA Awards	Best Director (Hindi)	Abrar Alvi	Won	
26th Annual BFJA Awards	Best Actor (Hindi)	Guru Dutt	Won	
26th Annual BFJA Awards	Best Supporting Actor (Hindi)	Rehman	Won	
26th Annual BFJA Awards	Best Cinematographer (Hindi)	V. K. Murthy	Won	
26th Annual BFJA Awards	Best Dialogue (Hindi)	Abrar Alvi	Won	
13th Berlin International Film Festival	Golden Bear	Sahib Bibi Aur Ghulam	Nominated	
10th Filmfare Awards	Best Film	Sahib Bibi Aur Ghulam	Won	
10th Filmfare Awards	Best Director	Abrar Alvi	Won	
10th Filmfare Awards	Best Actor	Guru Dutt	Nominated	
10th Filmfare Awards	Best Actress	Meena Kumari	Won	
10th Filmfare Awards	Best Supporting Actor	Rehman	Nominated	
10th Filmfare Awards	Best Supporting Actress	Waheeda Rehman	Nominated	
10th Filmfare Awards	Best Story	Bimal Mitra	Nominated	
10th Filmfare Awards	Best Cinematography	V. K. Murthy	Won	
10th National Film Awards	Best Feature Film in Hindi	Sahib Bibi Aur Ghulam	Won	

== Legacy ==
"It must have been in 1961 or 1962. I don’t remember the exact date, but it was during the filming of the final scene in Sahib Bibi [Aur Ghulam]. Jabba is waiting for Bhoothnath in a carriage in the haveli ruins. That was the last time we worked together. He never offered me another role after Sahib Bibi [Aur Ghulam]."

— Waheeda Rehman on Dutt ending their collaboration with the film

Sahib Bibi Aur Ghulam attained cult status and became a milestone in Hindi cinema. Along with Pyaasa (1957) and Kaagaz Ke Phool (1959), critics have regarded Sahib Bibi Aur Ghulam among Dutt's best work. According to Banerjee, Sahib Bibi Aur Ghulam is Dutt's last major contribution to the industry. It is also the only film Alvi directed. Film experts have regarded Kumari's performance in Sahib Bibi Aur Ghulam as one of the best of her career; according to Tejaswini Ganti, the film made her particularly known for tragic roles, and Raheja commented; "Meena took the audience on an unforgettable odyssey into the inner recesses of the mind of an emotionally and physically cloistered woman". Kumari played similar roles in several more films, including the dramas Dil Ek Mandir (1963), Chitralekha (1964), Gazal (1964), Kaajal (1965), Phool Aur Patthar (1966) and Pakeezah (1972). Dutt collaborated with Kumari again in Sanjh Aur Savera (1964), which was his last film to be released during his lifetime.

Several lists have included Sahib Bibi Aur Ghulam. In 2005, Rachel Dwyer selected the film for her book 100 Bollywood Films, and The Times of India's Rachna Kanwar included it in her listing of "25 Must See Bollywood Movies", commenting: "Chhoti Bahu is the most spectacular character in tragedienne Meena Kumari's career; a role that was uncannily similar to her own life Meena Kumari, like the miraculous sindoor she yearns for in the film mesmerizes you with her acting skills ... The film remains with you forever simply because of the splendid performance of Meena Kumari." As part of celebrations of the centenary of Indian cinema in 2013, Sahib Bibi Aur Ghulam was featured by IBN Live on their lists of "100 Greatest Indian Films of All Time". In the same year, Filmfare listed among the "100 Best Films" released between 1958 and 1969. The next year, the American Indologist Philip Lutgendorf of the University of Iowa chose the film for his list of "Ten Indian Popular Films that are Not-to-be-missed". Dwyer, in an article for Hindustan Times, listed the film in "70 Iconic Movies of Independent India" in 2017. On India's 75th Independence Day in 2021, Sahib Bibi Aur Ghulam appeared in The Indian Express' list of "75 Films that Celebrate the Journey of India".

In a 1994 interview with Sight & Sound, the scholar Ashish Rajadhyaksha considered the film a much more accurate depiction of India's corrupt 19th-century feudalism than Satyajit Ray's drama Jalsaghar (1958). In 2010, a retrospective of Dutt's films, including Sahib Bibi Aur Ghulam, was screened in Israel and was positively received by the audience. Jai Arjun Singh wrote the following year it is "one of Hindi cinema's most vivid treatments of a transitional period in India's social history". A dialogue from Rehman to Kumari "Gehne tudwao, gehne banvao. Aur koriyaan khelo. So aaram se." (Break old jewellery sets, make new ones. Play with shells. And sleep.), and Kumari's dialogue "Hindu ghar ki bahu hokar, kya sharab pee hai kissine?" (Has any Hindu household's daughter-in-law ever drunk liquor?) attained popularity. In 2012, film historians Dinesh Raheja and Jitendra Kothari published the film's screenplay as a book titled Sahib Bibi Aur Ghulam: The Original Screenplay, which also contains the authors' interviews with the surviving cast and crew.

== Bibliography ==
- Akbar, Khatija (2011) [1997]. 'I Want to Live': The Story of Madhubala. Hay House. ISBN 978-93-80480-81-7.
- Banerjee, Shampa (1985). Profiles: Five Film-makers from India. Directorate of Film Festivals. ISBN 81-201-0007-7.
- Deep, Mohan (1998). Simply Scandalous: Meena Kumari. Mumbai, India: Image Books. OCLC 606456998.
- Ganti, Tejaswini (26 August 2004). Bollywood: A Guidebook to Popular Hindi Cinema. Routledge. ISBN 978-0-415-28854-5.
- Dwyer, Rachel (2005). 100 Bollywood Films. London, United Kingdom: British Film Institute. ISBN 1-84457-099-1.
- Gulzar; Nihalani, Govind; Chatterjee, Saibal (26 February 2003). Encyclopaedia of Hindi Cinema. Encyclopædia Britannica, Inc. ISBN 978-81-7991-066-5.
- Kabir, Nasreen Munni (10 October 1996). Guru Dutt: A Life in Cinema. Oxford University Press. ISBN 978-0-19-563849-3.
- Kabir, Nasreen Munni (10 October 2006). Yours Guru Dutt: Intimate Letters of a Great Indian Filmmaker. Roli Books. ISBN 978-81-74363-88-6.
- Kabir, Nasreen Munni (19 February 2014). Conversations with Waheeda Rehman. Penguin Books. ISBN 978-0-670-08692-4.
- Mehta, Vinod (October 1972). Meena Kumari. Bombay, India: Jaico Publishing House. OCLC 586134668.
- Pickard, Roy (1 April 1981). The Award Movies A Complete Guide from A to Z. Schocken Books. ISBN 978-0-8052-0677-7. Archived from the original on 10 April 2023.
- Rajadhyaksha, Ashish; Willemen, Paul (1998) [1994]. Encyclopaedia of Indian Cinema (PDF). British Film Institute and Oxford University Press. ISBN 0-19-563579-5. Archived (PDF) from the original on 21 August 2016.
- Rangoonwala, Firoze (1973). Guru Dutt, 1925–1965: A Monograph. National Film Archive of India. OCLC 612789499. Archived from the original on 10 April 2023.
- Saran, Sathya (5 August 2009) [2008]. Ten Years with Guru Dutt: Abrar Alvi's Journey. Random House. ISBN 978-0-670-08221-6.
- Somaaya, Bhawana (12 February 2003). The Story So Far. Indian Express Limited. ISBN 978-81-223-1016-0.
- Usman, Yasser (7 January 2021). Guru Dutt: An Unfinished Story. Simon & Schuster. ISBN 978-93-86797-89-6.
