= The Dialogue of Pyaasa =

Book by Nasreen Munni Kabir

- Author: Nasreen Munni Kabir
- Language: English; Hindi; Urdu
- Subject: Pyaasa
- Published: 2 February 2011
- Publisher: Om Books International
- Publication place: India
- Media type: Print
- Pages: 240
- ISBN: 978-93-80070-53-7
- OCLC: 1049402787

The Dialogue of Pyaasa is a 2011 book by the British author and television documentary producer Nasreen Munni Kabir, containing the dialogues of the 1957 Indian romantic drama Pyaasa in Hindustani (a mix of Hindi and Urdu) and its translation in English. The book was published by Om Books International on 28 February 2011 and received positive critical reviews.

== Summary and release ==
The Dialogue of Pyaasa was written by the British author and television documentary producer Nasreen Munni Kabir, becoming the third publication on the Indian actor-cum-filmmaker Guru Dutt's work after the biographies Guru Dutt: A Life in Cinema (1996) and Yours Guru Dutt (2006). The book contains the dialogues of Pyaasa (1957)—in Hindi and Urdu—and its English-language translation, as well as lyrics for the soundtrack and a commentary by Kabir on the film. A romantic drama, Pyaasa features Dutt, Mala Sinha, Waheeda Rehman, Rehman, and Johnny Walker in the leading roles, and was released on 22 February 1957. Garnering positive response from audiences and critics,^{:75} it is subsequently dubbed as one of the best films in the genre.

Kabir told Sangeetha Devi Dundoo from The Hindu, "The film is immortal and its theme is universal, depicting unrequited love, greed, angst and rejection. Moreover, the younger generation may not be familiar with some of the Urdu words used in the film. The commentary will help them understand better." The Dialogue of Pyaasa is the fourth in her series of film dialogue books, following The Immortal Dialogue of Mughal-e-Azam (2006), The Dialogue of Mother India (2008), and The Dialogue of Awaara (2010). According to her, each books need took nine months or a year in developing and called the experiences challenging.

The Dialogue of Pyaasa was published by Om Books International on 2 February 2011 at an event held in Mumbai. Upon the release, there have been positive reviews by book critics. Shubhra Gupta, who wrote for The Indian Express, said, "The dialogue is spread out imaginatively across double-spread pages ... It gives you, at a glance, what the original dialogue was like, in beautiful Hindustani ... The English version loses all its charm in translation, but it serves the useful purpose of letting non-Hindi speakers access the dialogue easily." The Hindustan Times's Ishan Chaudhuri summarised that Kabir "brings us face-to-face with the non-visual ingredients: the words—helpfully translated to English and with a parallel 'original' in Hindi and Urdu scripts", and the entertainment portal Bollywood Hungama described the book "a collector's delight".
