= Minsara Kanavu =

1997 film by Rajiv Menon

- Theatrical release poster
- Directed by: Rajiv Menon
- Screenplay by: V. C. Guhanathan; Rajiv Menon
- Story by: Rajiv Menon
- Produced by: M. Saravanan; M. Balasubramanian; M. S. Guhan
- Starring: Arvind Swamy; Prabhu Deva; Kajol
- Cinematography: Venu; Ravi K. Chandran
- Edited by: Suresh Urs
- Music by: A. R. Rahman
- Production company: AVM Productions
- Release date: 14 January 1997
- Running time: 153 minutes
- Country: India
- Language: Tamil
- Budget: $1.5 million

Minsara Kanavu (transl. The electric dream) is a 1997 Indian Tamil-language musical romantic comedy film directed and co-written by Rajiv Menon. The film stars Arvind Swamy, Prabhu Deva, and Kajol (in her Tamil debut) in the lead roles. It revolves around Priya (Kajol), a convent student who wants to become a nun. Having returned to India from his studies overseas, Thomas (Swamy)—Priya's childhood friend—falls in love with her following their first meeting at her convent. With the help of hairstylist Deva (Prabhu Deva), who is known for his ability to change women's minds, Thomas tries to dissuade Priya from her ambition but Deva instead falls in love with her himself.

AVM Productions wanted to make a film to celebrate their golden jubilee in 1997. The project, which would be titled Minsara Kanavu, was produced by M. Saravanan, M. Balasubramanian, and M. S. Guhan. Menon responded to an advertisement for a director and cinematographer, and made his directorial debut with the film. Venu and Ravi K. Chandran completed the principal photography, and Prabhu Deva choreographed the film. A. R. Rahman composed the soundtrack, which received positive reviews, and the songs "Mana Madurai", "Strawberry", "Thanga Thamarai", and "Vennilave" became popular.

Minsara Kanavu premiered on 14 January 1997 during the Pongal festival and ran in theatres for over 175 days. The film was a commercial success in Tamil Nadu, though it initially opened to mediocre box-office earnings, but its dubbed versions performed poorly in North India and Telugu states. Critical reception to the film was mixed-to-positive; the plot, the cast's performances—particularly that of the lead actors—the screenplay, the cinematography, and the soundtrack were praised. The film won several accolades, including two Cinema Express Awards, one Filmfare Awards South, four National Film Awards, one Screen Awards, and three Tamil Nadu State Film Awards.

== Plot ==
Priya is a student at Lawrence School, Ooty. She is known for her friendly, and precocious nature. Since childhood Priya is interested in singing, and attending church. Priya's father Amalraj is a widower and a clothing industrialist who expects Priya to look after Amalraj Garments, but her desire is to become a nun. Amalraj tries to stop this by unsuccessfully arranging a marriage for Priya. Thomas Thangadurai, a non-resident Indian, returns to his home town Ooty after earning his Ph.D. from Harvard to look after his father James Thangadurai's business. James, a former associate of Amalraj, had set up his clothing business opposite Amalraj's factory. Amalraj dislikes James due to his boorish and clumsy attitude, even though Thomas and Priya are childhood friends.

Priya, after several years as a Novice at the convent, unexpectedly meets Thomas, who is visiting his aunt, the Mother Superior of the Lawrence School. He takes Priya's help in surprising his aunt with a gift on her birthday, and falls in love with Priya but is unable to tell her. Thomas is shocked when he learns of Priya's ambition to become a nun; he approaches a hairstylist named Deva, who is known for his ability to change women's minds, to dissuade her. Deva is hesitant but accepts. Deva and his friend, a blind, aspiring musician named Guru, befriend Priya and persuade her to join their music troupe. Priya's singing talent helps the troupe gain recognition and they are approached to audition for a film. Deva, Guru, and the rest of the troupe play tricks to make Priya fall in love with Thomas. Deva soon realises that he is also falling in love with Priya.

Complications arise when Priya reciprocates Deva's love and Thomas, with the help of Deva, declares his love to Priya. Priya finds out about Deva's reason for his association with her and, feeling betrayed, decides to return to the convent to undergo Novitiate. She quits the music troupe in Chennai and leaves. Deva tries to persuade Priya to remain with the troupe but he gets into a serious accident and falls into a coma. Priya undergoes the training but cannot forget Deva. Deva recovers from his coma and is visited by Thomas, who is disappointed that Priya cannot be with him but realises that Deva and Priya are meant for each other. Thomas rushes to the convent on the day Priya is to become a nun and, with the help of the Mother Superior, changes her mind and persuades her to marry Deva.

Thomas, now a priest, baptizes the daughter of Deva and Priya, who are married. Deva is looking after his father-in-law's business and Priya is working as a full-time singer. Guru has become a renowned music composer but is facing charges of plagiarism; James redistributes his wealth to everyone.

== Cast ==
- Arvind Swamy as Thomas Thangadurai
- Prabhu Deva as Deva (Voice dubbed by Vikram)
- Kajol as Priya (Voice dubbed by Revathi)
- V. K. Ramasamy as Guru's uncle
- Nassar as Guru
- Girish Karnad as Amalraj, Priya's father
- S. P. Balasubrahmanyam as James Thangadurai, Thomas' father
- Prakash Raj as Jaipal (special appearance)
- Arundathi Nag as Mother Superior
- Rallapalli as Amalraj's housekeeper
- Mohan Raman as Amalraj's associate
- Pasi Narayanan as Lawrence school watchman
- P. J. Sharma as Recording company agent
- Karthik Krupakaran as Raja, Deva's musician friend
- Rajiv Choudary as Amalraj's doctor and friend
- C. P. Satyajit as Mani, Deva's musician friend
- Anju Mahendran as Deva's musician friend
- Laxmi Rattan as Recording studio owner
- Ranvir Shah as David
- Janaki Sabesh as Sister Agnes

Uncredited appearances

- Rajiv Menon as Thomas's associate
- Gautham Vasudev Menon as a bystander

== Production ==
=== Development ===
"I'm not a prolific filmmaker, but I try exploring something new each time. I saw Minsara Kanavu more as a musical. The characters in that film came from a dream-like space, and most of it was shot inside the studio or in places that did not look like real places. That's why I called it Minsara Kanavu."

— Rajiv Menon on the film's title

AVM Productions wanted to make a film commemorating their 50th anniversary in 1997. (Note: The company initially produced films under different names such as Saraswathi Sound Productions, Saraswathi Talkies Producing Company, and Pragati Pictures, before changing it to AVM Productions and producing Naam Iruvar (1947) under the new name.) They wanted the film Minsara Kanavu, which was produced by M. Saravanan, M. Balasubramanian, and M. S. Guhan, to revolve around young people. Before choosing a director, the three producers approached Prabhu Deva to play the male lead and A. R. Rahman to compose the music. Rahman suggested his friend Rajiv Menon, then an advertisement director and film cinematographer, to direct the project. Menon thought about the offer for two months, saying he was not "mentally prepared" to direct a film. Initially reluctant, he was persuaded to direct the project by Rahman and filmmaker Mani Ratnam, and so this became his directorial debut. Menon wrote Minsara Kanavu's story, which is based on Robert Wise's 1965 film The Sound of Music; he also co-wrote the screenplay with V. C. Guhanathan in English.

=== Casting ===
Arvind Swamy was cast as Thomas, a non-resident Indian who, after returning from his studies abroad, meets and falls in love with his childhood friend Priya; he had earlier been Menon's replacement for the lead role in the 1992 film Roja. Menon's wife Latha suggested the Bollywood actor Kajol to play Priya, making Minsara Kanavu one of her only two appearances in Tamil cinema—the other being in Velaiilla Pattadhari 2 (2017). He originally wanted Aishwarya Rai for the role but felt she was "too stylish" and that he wanted a woman "who looked Indian". He recommended her to Ratnam, who he thought was better than Rai; she would instead star in Ratnam's Iruvar (1997), her acting debut. Madhuri Dixit was approached but she rejected the offer due to her busy schedule. Kajol said working on Minsara Kanavu was an "unforgettable experience", and that she was happy Menon gave her the part immediately after the other actresses rejected it. Kajol, a non-Tamil speaker, had her voice dubbed by Revathi.

Prabhu Deva, the first actor to be cast in the film, played the hairstylist Deva and also choreographed for the film. The producers chose Vikram to dub for him; Menon said they "wanted a new voice for Prabhu Deva". Nassar, playing the aspiring musician Guru, found the part fun and working in the film to be a "delightful experience". He described the character as high-spirited and added that "it was like, going through my youth again. Dancing, for instance—I never thought I could dance, but in this film I did it and loved it too." Janaki Sabesh, who was later known for portraying mother roles, made her acting debut in Minsara Kanavu by playing a nun. S. P. Balasubrahmanyam was chosen to play Thomas' father James. In his obituary published by The Hindu in 2020, Menon said Balasubrahmanyam was "so enthusiastic and joyous on [the] set", noting that it was interesting to see him acting opposite Girish Karnad, who played Priya's father Amalraj.

=== Filming ===
Venu and Ravi K. Chandran did the principal photography on Minsara Kanavu, and Chandran was credited with providing additional cinematography. Asked on his decision to not handle the cinematography, Menon said working as a director and cinematographer simultaneously could make him not "pay attention to both the departments equally". Menon even approached his mentor Ashok Mehta to handle the cinematography, but Mehta could not accept due to other commitments. Saravanan's brother Palu's daughter Lakshmipriya, who had returned from her costume design studies in Singapore, designed the costumes. Thota Tharani finished the art direction, Vikram Dharma was the action choreographer, and Prabhu Deva, Farah Khan, and Saroj Khan did the dance choreography. Filming took place at Lawrence School, Lovedale, The Church of The Ascension, Lovedale, St. Andrew's Church, Chennai, and Apollo Cancer Hospital-Chennai; in preparation, Menon interacted with several Christian priests. The song "Thanga Thamarai" was filmed at an artificial waterfall, "Mana Madurai" was shot at AVM Studio's outdoor space while the filming for "Poo Pookkum Osai" took place as AVM studios in Chennai and Ooty, Kullu, and Manali. Filming took between 70 and 75 days, and the footage was edited by Suresh Urs.

== Soundtrack ==
Minsara Kanavu's soundtrack album includes six songs that were composed by A. R. Rahman with lyrics by Vairamuthu. Recording of the tracks took place at Panchathan Record Inn. The film used different ragas (melodic modes) throughout the soundtrack, with the choral music being written in Sankarabharanam, and the song "Anbendra Mazhayile in Anandabhairavi. In an interview with Frontline Balasubrahmanyam said of the recording session of "Thanga Thamarai": "[I]t required a tone that reflected the feelings of someone totally smitten and intoxicated by love. The character singing the song in the film is on a high after finding his girl." He said he tried to imitate the composer, who helped to record vocals for the singer. Rahman chose K. S. Chithra for the song "Mana Madurai", also known as "Ooh La La La". He advised Chithra not to sing as she usually does but to completely open her voice to sing the track. The re-edited version of the track was featured on the international musical Bombay Dreams.

The soundtrack album was released on 25 December 1996, with the cast and crew attending the event and M. K. Stalin, the then-Mayor of Chennai, as the chief guest. Lyrics for the dubbed-Telugu soundtrack were written by Vennelakanti. Javed Akhtar wrote lyrics for the Hindi version of the soundtrack and a new song titled "Teri Meri Baat" was added.

All lyrics are written by Vairamuthu.

Minsara Kanavu (Tamil)
No.	Title	Singer(s)	Length
1.	"Poo Pookkum Osai"	Sujatha Mohan	6:44
2.	"Mana Madurai"	Unni Menon, K. S. Chithra, Srinivas	5:54
3.	"Anbendra"	Anuradha Sriram	3:38
4.	"Thanga Thamarai"	S. P. Balasubrahmanyam, Malgudi Subha	5:02
5.	"Strawberry Kannae"	KK, Febi Mani	4:25
6.	"Vennilave"	Hariharan, Sadhana Sargam	5:51

All lyrics are written by Veturi.

Merupu Kalalu (Telugu)
No.	Title	Singer(s)	Length
1.	"Oh Vaana Padithe"	Sujatha Mohan	6:49
2.	"Machili Patnam Mamidi"	K. S. Chithra, P. Unnikrishnan, Srinivas	5:57
3.	"Aparanji Madanudi"	Anuradha Sriram	3:41
4.	"Tallo Taamara"	S. P. Balasubrahmanyam, Malgudi Subha	5:05
5.	"Strawberry Kannae"	Mano, Swarnalatha	4:28
6.	"Vennelave Vennelave"	Hariharan, Sadhana Sargam	5:59

All lyrics are written by Javed Akhtar.

Sapnay (Hindi)
No.	Title	Singer(s)	Length
1.	"Awaara Bhanware"	Hema Sardesai, Malaysia Vasudevan	6:48
2.	"Roshan Huyi Raat"	Anuradha Sriram	3:39
3.	"Door Na Ja Mujh Se"	S. P. Balasubrahmanyam, Malgudi Subha	5:05
4.	"Ek Bagiya Mein"	Shankar Mahadevan, Srinivas, K. S. Chithra	5:54
5.	"Strawberry Aankhen"	KK, Kavita Paudwal	4:29
6.	"Chanda Re Chanda Re"	Hariharan, Sadhana Sargam	5:57
7.	"Teri Meri Baat"	Abhijeet Bhattacharya, Hema Sardesai	5:18

== Release ==
Minsara Kanavu was released on 14 January 1997 during the Pongal festival (Note: Pongal is a three-day Indian harvest festival celebrated in Tamil Nadu on 14 January every year as an equivalent of thanksgiving to the nature.) released at the same time as Ratnam's Iruvar, with which it competed. On its opening, Minsara Kanavu drew mediocre box-office earnings but it was eventually a success after running for 216 days in Chennai. On 3 August 1997, an event was held to celebrate its silver jubilee. (Note: A silver jubilee film is one that completes a theatrical run of 25 weeks or 175 days.) In order to celebrate the film's silver jubilee, AVM collaborated with 3 Roses tea brand and conducted a contest where audience who answered questions from the film will be travelling in a special train with cast and crew specially organized for the film's silver jubilee.

Minsara Kanavu's Telugu-dubbed version Merupu Kalalu, which was also released on 14 January, was a commercial disappointment. Screen suggested the possibility of the film, whose themes are intended for youths, being rejected by youths themselves. The magazine also thought that this was due to the producers, who took "a gamble in acquiring the rights of the films without knowing anything of their story or content". Minsara Kanavu was dubbed into Hindi as Sapnay, which premiered on 2 May 1997 and also failed commercially. The result of the Hindi version caused Menon to stop dubbing his films into that language.

== Critical reception ==
Minsara Kanavu received mixed response from critics. S. R. of Kalki praised the film's cinematography and music but criticised the plot and found the climax tiring. K. N. Vijiyan, who reviewed the film for the New Straits Times, likened its plot with that of a Hollywood film, finding it to be "vaguely similar. But even so, it has been adapted well to suit Indian culture." Calling the film "good entertainment", he lauded its screenplay and Kajol's performance, adding that she was at her best when she is "her naughty self or belting out songs" such as "Maana Madurai". Writing for The Indian Express, M. S. M. Desai was ambivalent about the Hindi dubbed version Sapnay, saying it is filled with many songs and dances that make "the pace of the narrative dull and drab".

Initial responses to the soundtrack were unfavourable; Desai said Rahman "fails miserably to come up with catchy numbers", but reception improved in the 21st century. The songs "Mana Madurai", "Strawberry", "Thanga Thamarai", and "Vennilave" became popular.

== Accolades ==
Award	Category	Recipient(s) and nominee(s)	Ref.
Cinema Express Awards	Best Lyrics Writer	Vairamuthu	
Cinema Express Awards	Best Cinematography	Venu	
Dinakaran Cinema Awards	Best Music Director	A. R. Rahman	
Filmfare Awards South	Best Music Director – Tamil	A. R. Rahman	
National Film Awards	Best Music Direction	A. R. Rahman	
National Film Awards	Best Male Playback Singer	S. P. Balasubrahmanyam for "Thanga Thamarai"	
National Film Awards	Best Female Playback Singer	K. S. Chithra for "Mana Madurai"	
National Film Awards	Best Choreography	Prabhu Deva for "Strawberry" and "Vennilave"	
Screen Awards	Best Music – Tamil	A. R. Rahman	
Tamil Nadu State Film Awards	Best Music Director	A. R. Rahman	
Tamil Nadu State Film Awards	Best Male Playback Singer	Unni Menon for "Mana Madurai"	
Tamil Nadu State Film Awards	Best Female Playback Singer	Sujatha Mohan for "Poo Pookkum Oosai"	

== Bibliography ==
- Mathai, Kamini (18 June 2009). A. R. Rahman: The Musical Storm. Viking Press. ISBN 978-0-670-08371-8.
- Kabir, Nasreen Munni (29 March 2011). A. R. Rahman: The Spirit of Music. Om Books International. ISBN 978-93-80070-14-8.
- Saravanan, M. (2013) [2005]. AVM 60 Cinema (in Tamil) (3rd ed.). Rajarajan Pathippagam. OCLC 1158347612.
