= Bindiya Chamkegi =

- Directed by: Tarun Dutt
- Written by: Gulshan Nanda
- Produced by: Guru Dutt Movies Pvt. Ltd.
- Starring: Vinod Mehra; Rekha
- Music by: R. D. Burman
- Release date: 1983
- Country: India
- Language: Hindi

Bindiya Chamkegi is a 1983 Indian Hindi film directed by Tarun Dutt, son of the veteran actor & director Guru Dutt. It stars Vinod Mehra, Rekha in lead roles, along with Amjad Khan, Johnny Walker in supporting roles. The music was composed by R. D. Burman.

== Plot ==
Shalini 'Shalu' lives a wealthy lifestyle with her businessman brother, Shyam Kapoor, and is expected to marry Surajbhan, the son of wealthy Thakursaheb. She would prefer that Shyam got married first so that he can have someone to look after him, but as he was in love with a woman named Maya, who betrayed him, and since then is a heavy drinker, and hates women. When he fails to convince Shalu to marry, he marries a woman named Bindiya and brings her home with him. A thrilled Shalu approves the marriage, and also announces that she would like to give a formal reception for her brother's marriage.

The reception does take place, but Thakursaheb subsequently informs Shyam that Surajbhan has already married a woman of his choice. Shyam asks his friend, Ranjeet, and both arrange for Shalu's marriage to Daulatram's son, however, Bindiya does not approve of him, so Shalu rejects him. What Shalu does not know is that Shyam is actually single, but has hired Bindiya to act as his wife; and what Shyam does not know is that Ranjeet is not who he claims to be, but someone who seeks vengeance on Shyam.

== Cast ==
- Vinod Mehra as Shyam Kapoor
- Rekha as Radha/Bindiya
- Shekhar Kapur as Raj Kumar
- Amjad Khan as Inspector Vijay Kumar
- Mazhar Khan as Rakesh / Ranjeet
- Shoma Anand as Shalini Kapoor
- Johnny Walker as Rahim
- Dina Pathak as Mrs Jeevan
- Dhumal as Daulatram
- Jagdish Raj as Police Commissioner Jeevan
- Bhagwan Dada as Havaldar

== Soundtrack ==
Lyricist: Anjaan

Song	Singer
"Na Teri Haan Bani"	Lata Mangeshkar
"Chhodke Bhaiya Ka Des"	Lata Mangeshkar
"Tuti Bajao, Bajao Shehnai"	Suresh Wadkar
"Phansai Liyo Re Hamen"	Asha Bhosle
"Baj Gayi Ghanti"	Asha Bhosle
