= 10th Filmfare Awards =

1963 awards for Hindi cinema

- Date: 13 June 1963
- Site: Bombay

Highlights
- Best Film: Sahib Bibi Aur Ghulam
- Best Actor: Ashok Kumar for Rakhi
- Best Actress: Meena Kumari for Sahib Bibi Aur Ghulam
- Most awards: Bees Saal Baad & Sahib Bibi Aur Ghulam (4)
- Most nominations: Sahib Bibi Aur Ghulam (8)

The 10th Filmfare Awards were held in Bombay on 13 June 1963, honoring the best films in Hindi Cinema of the year 1962.

Sahib Bibi Aur Ghulam led the ceremony with 8 nominations, followed by Bees Saal Baad with 7 nominations, Professor with 5 nominations and Rakhi with 4 nominations.

Bees Saal Baad and Sahib Bibi Aur Ghulam won 4 awards each, with the former winning Best Lyricist (Shakeel Badayuni for "Kahin Deep Jale Kahin Dil") and Best Playback Singer (Lata Mangeshkar for "Kahin Deep Jale Kahin Dil"), and the latter winning Best Film, Best Director (for Abrar Alvi) and Best Actress (for Meena Kumari), thus becoming the most-awarded films at the ceremony.

The ceremony marked the first occasion when all the nominations in any category were for a single person, with Meena Kumari receiving all 3 nominations for Best Actress for Aarti, Main Chup Rahungi and Sahib Bibi Aur Ghulam, winning for the lattermost.

Mehmood received dual nominations for Best Supporting Actor for his performances in Dil Tera Diwana and Rakhi, winning for the former.

== Main awards ==
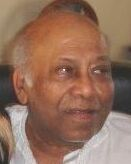
Abrar Alvi, Best Director

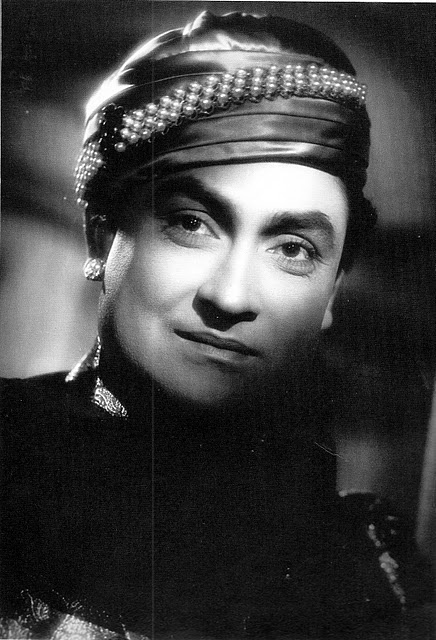
Ashok Kumar, Best Actor

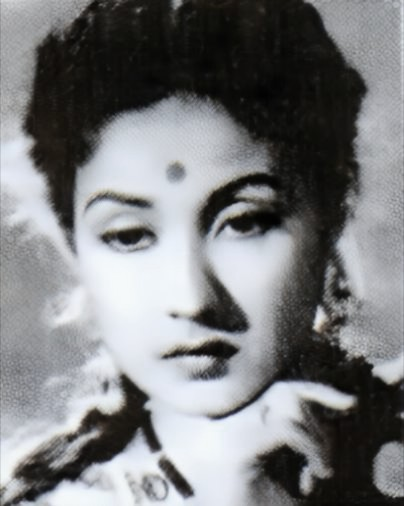
Meena Kumari, Best Actress

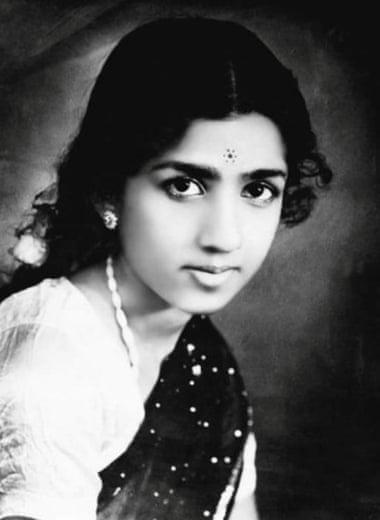
Lata Mangeshkar, Best Playback Singer

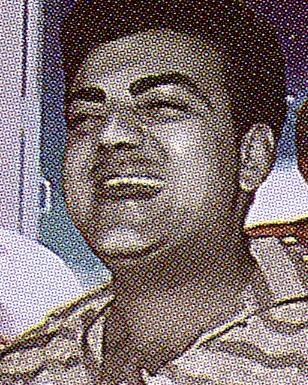
Mehmood, Best Supporting Actor

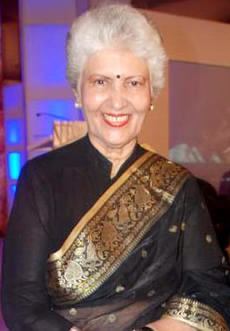
Shashikala, Best Supporting Actress

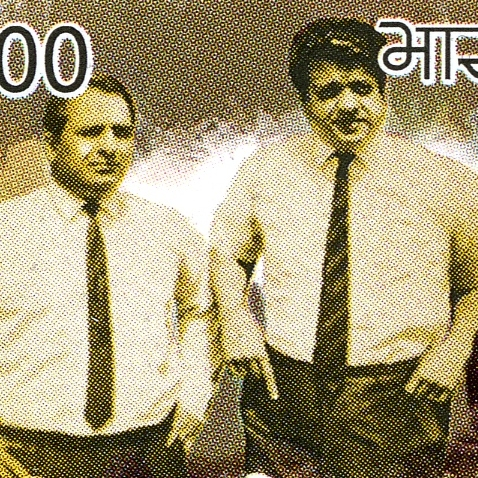
Shankar Jaikishan, Best Music Director

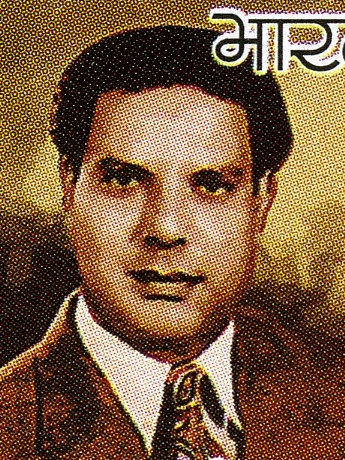
Shakeel Badayuni, Best Lyricist

| Best Film | Best Director |
|---|---|
| Sahib Bibi Aur Ghulam – Guru Dutt Films – Guru Dutt; Bees Saal Baad – Geetanjali Pictures – Hemant Kumar; Rakhi – Prabhuram Pictures – Sivaji Ganesan | Abrar Alvi – Sahib Bibi Aur Ghulam; Biren Nag – Bees Saal Baad; Mehboob Khan – Son of India |
| Best Actor | Best Actress |
| Ashok Kumar – Rakhi as Raj Kumar "Raju"; Guru Dutt – Sahib Bibi Aur Ghulam as Atulya Chakraborty "Bhootnath"; Shammi Kapoor – Professor as Prof. Pritam Khanna | Meena Kumari – Sahib Bibi Aur Ghulam as Sati Laxmi "Chhoti Bahu"; Meena Kumari – Aarti as Dr. Aarti Gupta; Meena Kumari – Main Chup Rahungi as Gayatri |
| Best Supporting Actor | Best Supporting Actress |
| Mehmood – Dil Tera Diwana as Anokhe / Mohan; Mehmood – Rakhi as Kasturi; Rehman – Sahib Bibi Aur Ghulam as Chhote Sarkar | Shashikala – Aarti as Jaswanti; Lalita Pawar – Professor as Sita Devi Verma; Waheeda Rehman – Sahib Bibi Aur Ghulam as Jaba |
| Best Music Director | Best Lyricist |
| Shankar–Jaikishan – Professor; Hemant Kumar – Bees Saal Baad; Madan Mohan – Anpadh | Shakeel Badayuni – "Kahin Deep Jale Kahin Dil" from Bees Saal Baad; Hasrat Jaipuri – "Ae Gulbadan" from Professor; Raja Mehdi Ali Khan – "Aapki Nazron Ne Samjha" from Anpadh |
| Best Playback Singer – Male | Best Playback Singer – Female |
| Award won by a female singer; Mohammed Rafi – "Ae Gulbadan" from Professor | Lata Mangeshkar – "Kahin Deep Jale Kahin Dil" from Bees Saal Baad; Lata Mangeshkar – "Aapki Nazron Ne Samjha" from Anpadh |
| Best Story | Best Dialogue |
| K. P. Kottarakara – Rakhi; Bimal Mitra – Sahib Bibi Aur Ghulam; Jawar N. Sitaraman – Main Chup Rahungi | Akhtar ul Iman – Dharmputra |

== Technical Awards ==
| Best Editing | Best Cinematography |
|---|---|
| Keshav Nanda – Bees Saal Baad | V. K. Murthy – Sahib Bibi Aur Ghulam |
| Best Art Direction | Best Sound Design |
| D. R. Jadhav and Ram Yedekar – Son of India | S. Y. Pathak – Bees Saal Baad |

== Superlatives ==
The following films had multiple wins and/or nominations

| Movie | Awards | Nominations |
|---|---|---|
| Sahib Bibi Aur Ghulam | 4 | 8 |
| Bees Saal Baad | 4 | 7 |
| Rakhi | 2 | 4 |
| Professor | 1 | 5 |
| Aarti | 1 | 2 |
| Son of India | 1 | 2 |
| Anpadh | 0 | 2 |
| Main Chup Rahungi | 0 | 2 |

== See also ==
- 9th Filmfare Awards
- 11th Filmfare Awards
- Filmfare Awards
