= A. R. Rahman: The Spirit of Music =

2011 biography Nasreen Munni Kabir

- Author: Nasreen Munni Kabir
- Language: English
- Subject: A. R. Rahman
- Genre: Biography
- Published: 29 March 2011
- Publisher: Om Books International
- Publication place: India
- Media type: Print
- Pages: 215
- ISBN: 978-93-80070-14-8
- OCLC: 722845483

A. R. Rahman: The Spirit of Music is a biographical book by the author and television documentary producer Nasreen Munni Kabir, containing her extensive conversations with the composer A. R. Rahman on the latter's life and career. It describes his birth in Madras (present-day Chennai) in 1967, his 29-year-long musical career, and his marriage in 1995 to Saira Banu, with whom he has three children. The book was published by Om Books International on 29 March 2011 and declared as a commercial success.

The Spirit of Music was the second work on Rahman, following the unauthorised biography A. R. Rahman: The Musical Storm (2009) from Kamini Mathai. Kabir's first discussion with him about the book happened in 2003, while their conversations started in 2007 and ended four years later. Critical reviews to the book were mixed, some of which panned the author for providing less detail information about his Tamil songs. However, its question-and-answer format was generally praised.

== Summary ==
The book contains A. R. Rahman's extensive conversations with the author Nasreen Munni Kabir. It begins with his birth in Madras (present-day Chennai) in 1967. The book chronicles his cinematic debut, composing songs for Roja (1992), which became the first of his many collaborations with the filmmaker Mani Ratnam, and his 29-year-long career in music. It also includes his conversion from Hinduism to Islam, his marriage to Saira Banu in 1995 and the birth of their three children. The book ends with his discography, his list of accolades, and notes for the 1995 film Bombay's theme song and Roja's "Cry of the Rose".

== Writing and release ==
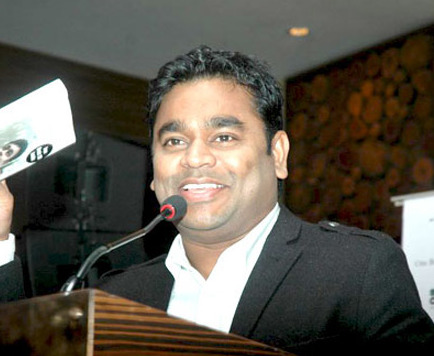
A. R. Rahman (pictured) at the launch of the book in 2011

Nasreen Munni Kabir, who had written several books on Indian cinema throughout her career, often used the question-and-answer style for her works and A. R. Rahman: The Spirit of Music is one of which. In later interviews, she stated that she found the style to be the best way to keep the book's readers "connected to the subject", that she liked primary research and "people speaking in their own words, from their own experience" but it did not mean that narrative biographies weren't needed, rather that it was a good format due to Rahman's busy schedule. Kabir had first met Rahman while interviewing him at his studio in Chennai for BBC's Channel 4 in 1999. However, their earliest discussion on the idea of the book began in 2003, which was later met with approval from Rahman.

The conversations started in 2007,^{:6} but Rahman states that the "actual work" began the next year. According to him, a lot of the facts in the book were already disclosed by him in other media interviews but includes some new aspects and he states that what "[Kabir] wanted to do was to have a completeness in the whole thing, and that’s what is special about [her] and what makes [the book] work." Kabir recounted that the process was slow, attributing it to his busy schedule. When Rahman was not on his mood for talking, they would take a walk while Kabir asked him her questions. Describing him as spiritual, Kabir likened working with him to being on an adventure and noted how free-spirited he was. She also felt Rahman was more confident when she interviewed him for the book, believing that his older age and the success of his works have influenced him. The conversations ended in 2011.^{:6}

The Spirit of Music was published on hardcover on 29 March 2011; a CD containing Rahman's eight unreleased songs is also included in the edition. The book's launch event was held in Juhu, Mumbai on 6 April. The book was the second work on Rahman, after Kamini Mathai's A. R. Rahman: The Musical Storm (2009), but was the first one authorised by Rahman himself; he explained that he had not read Mathai's book so he had not authorised it either. Ajay Mago from Om Books International, who released The Spirit of Music, told Bollywood Hungama that it was an honour for him to publish the book. Emerging as a commercial success, The Spirit of Music debuted at and peaked the fifth position in The Hindu's non-fiction bestsellers on 19 April. Its Amazon Kindle version was released on 7 July 2017, followed by the paperback edition twelve days later.

== Critical reception ==
Critics had given varied views on the book. Charmy Harikrishnan of The Indian Express was critical of Kabir's research on Rahman's Tamil films, dismissing it as "meagre and unsatisfactory", and added that "the way in which the Q and A has been arranged does little to give the book a structure or the narrative any kind of coherence". A reviewer at Bollywood Hungama suggested Kabir to divide the book in several chapters and stated "there is a distinct sense of incompleteness that one gets mid-way into reading it", while the magazine India Today's Kaveree Bamzai called it "a remarkable insight into a magical mind". Bamzai added that "Rahman is an anomaly. Sometimes the more he's written about, the less he seems revealed. Kabir's patient listening pays off. Rahman seems at ease here, talking as openly about his faith as he does about his wife."

Writing for the Emirati newspaper Gulf News, Mythily Ramachandran found the book "easy-to-read" and concise. She said it "does whet your appetite interspersed with pictures from Rahman's albums, hitherto unseen", concluding her review by praising Kabir for doing a job well done. The editor Jitesh Pillai of the Filmfare magazine asserted, "Trying to capture his thoughts and songscapes cannot be an easy task and Nasreen Munni Kabir ... does manage an enthusiastic job. It's in interview format and we get to know the maestro up close and personal and there are anecdotes there, priceless ones that intrigue, overwhelm and stay with you." Kala Krishnan Ramesh from Indiaplaza recommended it for those who are fans of Rahman, complimenting Kabir's thorough and perceptive questioning style. The Hindustan Times described it as "a close, fascinating insight" on him.

== Publication history ==
Region	Release date	Format
India	29 March 2011	Hardcover
India	7 July 2017	Amazon Kindle
India	19 July 2017	Paperback

== Sources ==
- "A. R. Rahman's first authorized biography to release on April 6". Bollywood Hungama. 22 March 2011. Archived from the original on 12 August 2021.
- Bamzai, Kaveree (2 May 2011). "Item nation". India Today. Archived from the original on 12 August 2021.
- "Bestsellers". The Hindu. Hyderabad, India. 19 April 2011.
- "Book review: A. R. Rahman – The Spirit of Music". Bollywood Hungama. 11 April 2011. Archived from the original on 23 September 2020.
- Ghosh, Shohini (6 May 2011). "Jai ho!". Hindustan Times.
- Harikrishnan, Charmy (16 April 2011). "Rahman recorded". The Indian Express. Archived from the original on 12 August 2021.
- Jamkhandikar, Shilpa (9 April 2011). "A minute with: A.R. Rahman on 'The Spirit of Music'". Reuters. Archived from the original on 12 August 2021.
- Jhunjhunwala, Udita (1 April 2011). "Sheet music, soul notes". Mint.
- Kabir, Nasreen Munni (29 March 2011). A. R. Rahman: The Spirit of Music. Noida, India: Om Books International. ISBN 978-93-80070-14-8.
- Kabir, Nasreen Munni (7 July 2017). A. R. Rahman: The Spirit of Music. Noida, India: Om Books International. ASIN B074L8PQPK.
- Kabir, Nasreen Munni (19 July 2017). A. R. Rahman: The Spirit of Music. Noida, India: Om Books International. ISBN 978-93-52761-16-6.
- Kumar, Anuj (29 April 2011). "Noteworthy encounters". The Hindu.
- N., Patcy (7 April 2011). "Rahman's biography launched". Rediff.com. Archived from the original on 10 April 2011.
- N., Patcy (19 April 2011). "'Working with Rahman is an adventure'". Rediff.com. Archived from the original on 23 April 2011.
- Pillai, Jitesh (6 January 2016). "Revealing Rahman". Filmfare. Archived from the original on 18 August 2021.
- Raghavan, Nikhil (3 April 2011). "A lot's in a book". The Hindu.
- Ramachandran, Mythily (6 May 2011). "The world dances to his tunes". Gulf News. Archived from the original on 18 August 2021.
- Ramesh, Kala Krishnan (25 July 2011). "Print pick". The Hindu. Archived from the original on 18 August 2021.
