= Lata Mangeshkar ...in Her Own Voice =

2009 book by Nasreen Munni Kabir

- Author: Nasreen Munni Kabir
- Language: English
- Subject: Lata Mangeshkar
- Genre: Biography
- Published: 15 May 2009
- Publisher: Niyogi Books
- Publication place: India
- Media type: Print
- Pages: 268
- ISBN: 978-81-89738-41-9

Lata Mangeshkar ...in Her Own Voice is a biography by the British author and television documentary producer Nasreen Munni Kabir, detailing the life and career of the Indian playback singer Lata Mangeshkar. The book contains their extensive conversations from May 2008 to March 2009. Published by Niyogi Books on. 15 May 2009, it was well received by literary critics.

== Development and writing ==
The book was Nasreen Munni Kabir's second work on the playback singer Lata Mangeshkar, after a documentary titled Lata in Her Own Voice that aired on Channel 4 in 1991. According to Kabir, Mangeshkar agreed to be involved in the project since she liked her previous documentary, In Search of Guru Dutt (1989), about the filmmaker Guru Dutt. The conversations were done with twenty sessions through phone calls, taking place between May and August 2008 when Kabir was in London. After she arriving in Mumbai in October, they continued their conversations until March the next year. Kabir spoke of her experience in an interview to The Hindu, "It was not very challenging. Lataji has such a fabulous memory. She is an engaging conversationalist. Very intelligent, she does not suffer inane questions. She is very polite. You have to find newer ways to ask her the same things. You have to think a lot. You cannot approach her with a pre-planned list of questions and you simply cannot manipulate her answers."

== Release and reception ==
Lata Mangeshkar ...in Her Own Voice was released on 15 May 2009 by Niyogi Books. The writer from the entertainment portal Bollywood Hungama wrote that it is "an extremely heavy (reading wise) text book on the living legend and her work. A kind of book that could be a reference material for many a students, of the lady who doesn't have any parallel." Business Standard's Kishore Singh described the book as "the closest you'll come to probably knowing Lata Mangeshkar", and Kaveree Bamzai of India Today added: "The book speaks of an era where music and lyrics meant something more than a marketing tool ... In the course of conversations over several months, Nasreen Munni Kabir draws out Mangeshkar on the subject of her music directors, her early difficulties, her supposed rivalry with her sister, even her disappointment, if any, for never marrying."

The Tribune commented, "It is a priceless collector's item with pictures of her from childhood to the present day with innumerable celebrities who came into her life." Shubhra Gupta from The Indian Express described it as "that kind of book", opining, "The book reveals, with great affection and abiding respect, and with the liberal use of lovely rare black-and-white photographs, the making of an Indian icon." The Hindu's R. Krithika summarised, "There is much information for Lata’s fans here and also for those interested in the dynamics of the early Hindi film industry. Think of all that was done without all the musical technology that we take for granted today ... The tone is conversational and easy, and the text is laid out in an easy-on-the-eye manner with excellent photographs placed strategically."
