= The Inner and Outer World of Shah Rukh Khan =

Documentary series directed by Nasreen Munni Kabir

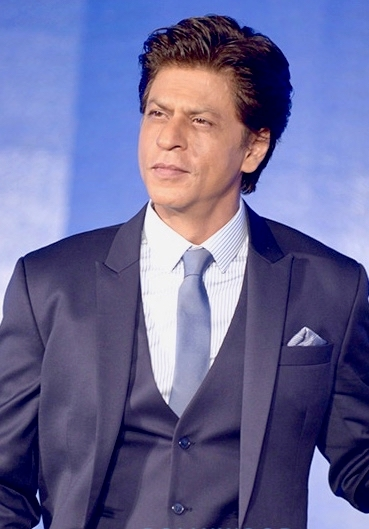
Shahrukh Khan

The Inner and Outer World of Shahrukh Khan is the release title for a pair of documentaries pertaining to Bollywood actor Shahrukh Khan, both directed by the London-based writer and producer/director Nasreen Munni Kabir, an authority on Hindi cinema. The first film, The Inner World of Shahrukh Khan, for BBC Channel 4, examines the actor's family history and daily life, while the second, The Outer World of Shahrukh Khan, produced by Khan's Red Chillies Entertainment, follows him on his 2004 Temptations concert tour in Europe and the United States. In contrasting Khan's two worlds, Kabir analyzes the effect that stardom has on "a man who evidently has taken Indian cinema to the next level. Inner World on and off set, from Mumbai to Delhi, Shah Rukh Khan shares with us his deeply personal memories, thoughts and experiences between a hectic schedule. A candid, sensitive and gentle portrait of a thoughtful man. Outer World A fascinating journey through the UK and the USA in the company of Shah Rukh Khan, as he fills the largest stadiums and arenas in 14 major cities. Venturing where no camera has ever gone before, we follow King Khan as he performs for thousands of screaming fans whilst, behind the glamour and the glitter, we reveal the serious dedication of a star caught in the eye of an adoring storm (by Ali Naved)."
