= Guru Dutt Films =

Indian classical film production company (now dissolved)

- Type: Private Limited company
- Industry: Film production Film distribution Entertainment
- Founded: 11 January 1955; Bombay, Bombay State, India (present-day Mumbai, Maharashtra)
- Founder: Guru Dutt
- Fate: Inactive
- Key people: Guru Dutt; Geeta Dutt
- Products: Films

Guru Dutt Films Private Limited was an Indian film production company, founded by actor-director Guru Dutt in 1955. Guru Dutt Films, along with the Guru Dutt team, saw some of its best works during the 1950s and 1960s, also sometimes referred to as the "Golden age of Indian cinema."

As of 2004, it was run by Dutt's son - Arun Dutt, who wrote and directed the film Khule Aam (1992). The company has been defunct since at least 2017 per the Ministry of Corporate Affairs.

== Filmography ==
- 1951 Baazi
- 1953 Baaz
- 1954 Aar-Paar
- 1955 Mr. & Mrs. '55
- 1956 C.I.D.
- 1957 Pyaasa
- 1959 Kaagaz Ke Phool
- 1960 Chaudhvin Ka Chand
- 1962 Sahib Bibi Aur Ghulam
- 1966 Baharen Phir Bhi Aayengi
- 1968 Shikar
- 1969 Chanda Aur Bijli
- 1984 Bindiya Chamkegi
