= Guru Dutt: A Life in Cinema =

1996 book by Nasreen Munni Kabir

- Author: Nasreen Munni Kabir
- Language: English
- Subject: Guru Dutt
- Genre: Biography
- Published: 1996
- Publisher: Oxford University Press
- Publication place: India
- Media type: Print
- Pages: 152
- ISBN: 978-01-95638-49-3
- OCLC: 605709505

Guru Dutt: A Life in Cinema is a 1996 biography written by the British author and television documentary producer Nasreen Munni Kabir, detailing the life and career of the Indian actor-cum-filmmaker Guru Dutt. The book chronicles Dutt's birth in Panambur in 1925, his 18-year-long film career, his marriage to the playback singer Geeta Dutt, with whom he had three children, and his death in 1964.

== Summary and release ==
The book chronicles the Indian actor and filmmaker Guru Dutt's birth in Panambur on 9 July 1925. He made his acting debut with Baazi in 1951, and details his commercially successful films, including the comedies Aar Paar (1954) and Mr. & Mrs. '55 (1955), the thriller C.I.D (1956), and the social film Chaudhvin Ka Chand (1960). It also discusses his marriage in 1953 to the playback singer Geeta Dutt, with whom he had three children, and his suicidal death on 10 October 1964.

The book was the British author and television documentary producer Nasreen Munni Kabir's second work about Dutt, after a documentary titled In Search of Guru Dutt (1989). Since the late 1970s, Kabir has become of his fan after programming his films for film festivals and television channels in Europe. For her research, she met Dutt's family members, including the son Tarun, whom she met in 1982 and once again during the production of her documentary Movie Mahal in 1987.^{:5} She also collected Dutt's magazine interviews (such as those from Filmfare) which are available in print edition at the National Film Archive of India in Pune.^{:9}

The book was published by Oxford University Press in 1996. Amit Agarwal of India Today wrote, "The trouble with this book is that it doesn't go much farther than a three-part documentary on Dutt ... For those who have seen the documentary on Indian television, the book doesn't have much that's new to offer. [Kabir] also fails to provide definitive answers to many of the questions attached to Dutt's life: What exactly tormented him? What led to his several suicide attempts? Why did he end up living a life of isolation?" Another edition was published on 11 December 1997.
