= Yours Guru Dutt =

Book by Nasreen Munni Kabir

- Author: Nasreen Munni Kabir
- Language: English
- Subject: Guru Dutt
- Genre: Biography
- Published: 2006
- Publisher: Roli Books
- Publication place: India
- Media type: Print
- Pages: 168
- ISBN: 978-81-74363-88-6
- OCLC: 494710408

Yours Guru Dutt is a 2006 book by the British author and television documentary producer Nasreen Munni Kabir, containing a total of 37 handwritten letters in both English and Hindi by the Indian actor and filmmaker Guru Dutt—most of which are addressed to his wife Geeta. The book, published by Roli Books and became Kabir's second book about Dutt after Guru Dutt: A Life in Cinema (1996), was commercially successful. It garnered positive critical acclaim, with some reviewers noting the elegance in his letters.

== Summary and release ==
The book was the British author and television documentary producer Nasreen Munni Kabir's third work on the Indian filmmaker-cum-actor Guru Dutt, after the documentary In Search of Guru Dutt (1989) and the book Guru Dutt: A Life in Cinema (1996). Yours Guru Dutt contains thirty-seven handwritten letters from him: thirty three to his wife, Geeta, and the rests to his son, Arun and Tarun. Kabir obtained the letters along with his passport, his reading glasses, and his leather wallet in 2004 from Arun. She said, "Guru Dutt's brief and tragic life is captured in these beautiful and now over fifty-year-old letters. The very sight of these letters is evocative of a past when letter-writing itself had a kind of romanticism, giving meaning and pleasure to both the person writing and the person for whom the letter was intended."

Kabir said in an interview with The Telegraph that it was to be released in 2005, coinciding with Geeta's 75th birth anniversary, however, the elaborate designing process and the poor condition of the letters, made it was postponed to the next year. Published by Roli Books, the book turned to be a commercial success and was met with positive reviews from book critics. Indrajit Hazra from the Hindustan Times wrote, "Guru Dutt's handwriting, jumping off the pages in clear larger-than-reputation size and colour, seems to be as much part of the director's oeuvre." The Tribune's Ambika Sharma believed the book "reflects the true Guru Dutt and provides us with an insight into his turbulent life. It is a tribute to his wife on her seventy-fifth birth anniversary", and added that Kabir has done a well work.

Kaveree Bamzai of India Today observed of it, "The letters are like the chronicle of a death foretold. Dutt's mood swings, his declarations of love, his frustration and his confusion, all pour through the pages of a book which is as elegant as a frame lit by Dutt's magical lens." The critic and social commentator Ziya Us Salam declared that Kabir "has just walked down the anonymity lane", and Ajit Duara, who wrote for The Hindu called the publication a "elegantly-produced book", further mentioning that the letters are also important addition of biographical material on Dutt. Reviewing the book for Outlook magazine, the academic Shiv Visvanathan referred to it as a "beautifully-produced collection" and praised the footnotes on every letters as "a piece of scholarship". However, he was disappointed since there are no Geeta's response letters of Dutt's letters to her that appear in the book.
