= Sanjh Aur Savera =

- Poster
- Directed by: Hrishikesh Mukherjee
- Written by: Dialogues: Jagdish Kanwal
- Screenplay by: Dhruva Chatterjee; Jagdish Kanwal; D. N. Mukherjee; Anil Ghosh
- Story by: Jagdish Kanwal
- Produced by: Sevantilal Shah
- Cinematography: Jaywant Pathare]
- Edited by: Das Dhaimade
- Music by: Shankar Jaikishan
- Production company: S.J. Films
- Release date: 1964
- Country: India
- Language: Hindi

Sanjh Aur Savera (lit. 'Dusk and Dawn') is a 1964 Bollywood romantic drama film starring Guru Dutt, Meena Kumari and Mehmood. It was produced by Sevantilal Shah and directed by Hrishikesh Mukherjee. Music of the film was by Shankar Jaikishan. It marked the final film appearance of Guru Dutt who died later in the year of the film's release.

== Plot ==
Dr. Shankar Chaudhry, a wealthy doctor who resides in Bombay with his younger sister, Manju, and his widowed mother, Rukmimi, finds that his mother has arranged a marriage for him with advocate Madhusudan's daughter, Maya. He concedes to the marriage, even though neither he nor his mother have met her. During the ceremony, Maya faints and recuperates under the care of her cousin, brother Prakash, and Madhusudan, and then the following day accompanies Shankar to his home. Maya rejects Shankar's sexual advances, as she is participating in a Holy Fast.

On a visit to Banaras, where Madhusudan now resides, Shankar remarries Maya at Bhagwan Vishwanath's Temple. Their relationship becomes intimate and she becomes pregnant.

Shankar arrives home one day and discovers that Prakash and Maya are missing; his search for them proves fruitless. He later learns that his wife is an imposter and that she is probably married to Prakash.

== Cast ==
- Guru Dutt as Dr. Shankar Chaudhry
- Meena Kumari as Gauri
- Mehmood as Prakash
- Shubha Khote as Radha (as Subha Khote)
- Manmohan Krishna
- Padmadevi (as Padma Devi)
- Jagdev
- Harindranath Chattopadhyay as Mama, Radha's uncle
- Brahm Bhardwaj
- Kanu Roy
- Rashid Khan as music shop owner
- Preeti Bala
- Praveen Paul as Manorama - Radha's mom (as Ruby Paul)
- Zeb Rehman as Maya

== Soundtrack ==
- "Ajhun Na Aye Balamwa Revival": Mohammed Rafi, Suman Kalyanpur
- "Ajhun Na Aye Balamwa": Mohammed Rafi, Suman Kalyanpur
- "Chand Kanwal Mere Chand Kanwal": Suman Kalyanpur
- "Man Mohan Krishna Murari": Lata Mangeshkar
- "O Sajna Mere Ghar Angna": Lata Mangeshkar
- "Taqdeer Kahan Le Jayegi Malum Nahin": Mohammed Rafi
- "Yehi Hai Woh Sanjh Aur Savera": Mohammed Rafi, Asha Bhosle
- "Zindagi Mujhko Dikha De Rasta": Mohammed Rafi
