= Mr. & Mrs. '55 =

1955 film

- Theatrical release poster
- Directed by: Guru Dutt
- Written by: Abrar Alvi (also dialogues)
- Screenplay by: Abrar Alvi
- Story by: Abrar Alvi
- Based on: Modern Wife (play) by Abrar Alvi
- Produced by: Guru Dutt
- Starring: Madhubala; Guru Dutt; Lalita Pawar; Johnny Walker; Vinita Bhatt
- Cinematography: V.K. Murthy
- Edited by: Y. G. Chawhan
- Music by: O. P. Nayyar
- Production company: Guru Dutt Films
- Distributed by: Ultra Distributors Pvt. Ltd.
- Release date: February 11, 1955
- Running time: 157 minutes
- Country: India
- Language: Hindi
- Box office: est. ₹17.5 million

Mr. & Mrs. '55 is a 1955 Indian romantic comedy film directed and produced by Guru Dutt, from a screenplay written by Abrar Alvi based on the play Modern Wife, Alvi wrote during his college days. A socially critical film set in urban Mumbai, it stars Madhubala as Anita Verma, a naive heiress who is forced into a marriage with an unemployed cartoonist (Guru Dutt) to save her millions.

Mr. & Mrs. '55 was among the early works of Dutt, and was also one of the few comedies made by him. Upon its theatrical release on 11 February 1955, the film emerged as a major commercial success. Its box-office success marked a reversal of fortunes for actress Madhubala, who was one of the film stars deemed "box office poison" in 1954. Her portrayal of Anita Verma has been generally considered one of her most memorable and identifiable performances.

In 2019, Time Out placed it at the 57th place in the list of "The 100 Best Bollywood movies". The movie was appreciated for its comic sequences but was criticised for its problematic portrayal of feminism and progressive themes.

== Plot ==
Full-length film

Preetam (Guru Dutt), a struggling cartoonist, meets Anita (Madhubala) at a tennis match, where she is watching her favourite tennis star. Anita, a wealthy and westernised heiress, is controlled by her aunt, Seeta Devi (Lalita Pawar). Seeta is suspicious of men and cultivates her attitudes in Anita. However, to receive her fortune, her father's will decrees that Anita must marry within one month of turning 21. Seeta Devi doesn't agree with this and tries to set Anita up with a sham marriage which will soon lead to divorce, thereby giving her both freedom and a fortune. Seeta hires Preetam to marry Anita, but she doesn't know that the pair have already met. Preetam is kept from Anita after their marriage, but he kidnaps her and takes her to the traditional house of his brother.

While at the house, Anita befriends Preetam's sister-in-law, and she begins to see the merit in becoming a wife. Preetam is worried that he has lost Anita and expedites their divorce by providing false, incriminating evidence to the court. Preetam then leaves Mumbai, heartbroken. Anita now recognises her feelings for Preetam and rushes to meet him at the airport. In the end, the couple is reunited.

== Cast ==
- Madhubala as Mrs. Anita Verma Kumar
- Guru Dutt as Preetam Kumar
- Lalita Pawar as Mrs. Seeta Devi Verma (Anita's Aunt)
- Johnny Walker as Johnny
- Yasmin as Julie
- Kumkum as Preetam's sister-in-law
- Uma Devi as Lily D'Silva
- Radhika as Moni
- Anwari as Anita's Nanny
- Haroon as Advocate
- Rooplaxmi as Seeta Devi's follower
- Moni Chatterji as Judge
- Al-Nasir as Ramesh, tennis player
- Bir Sakhuja as Mr. Sharma, editor
- Cuckoo as singer in the song "Neele Aasmani"
- Jagdeep as paper boy
- Chandrashekhar Dubey as Doctor
- Moolchand as husband of the lady in theater
- Rooplaxmi as toy seller singer

== Production ==
The cartoons in the film were drawn by R. K. Laxman.

The initial choice for playing Anita Verma, the main character of the film, was Shyama. Guru Dutt had approached her as she was his leading lady in the highly successful Aar Paar (1954), but Shyama demanded a high fee and he refused. Dutt then contacted Vyjayanthimala, who rejected the role due to her hectic schedule and later recalled it as her "worst decision ever" in 2011. It was then when Madhubala was chosen to play the leading lady in the film.

== Soundtrack ==
The music was composed by O. P. Nayyar and Majrooh Sultanpuri was the lyricist.

The song "Preetam Aan Milo" was originally sung by C. H. Atma in 1945 as a non-filmly song written by Saroj Mohini Arora whom, he went on to marry later. Nayyar, having liked that song, included it in the film and it was sung by Geeta Dutt. The song "Neela Aasmani" was sampled by American rappers 2 Chainz and 42 Dugg in their song "Million Dollars Worth of Game".

Song	Singer(s)	Lyricist
"Preetam Aan Milo, Dukhiya Jiya Bulaaye..."	Geeta Dutt	Saroj Mohini Arora (uncredited)
"Neele Aasmani Bujhe Toh Yeh Naina Bapu Kisike Liye Hai..."	Geeta Dutt	Majrooh Sultanpuri
"Ab To Ji Hone Laga Kisike Surat Ka Saamna..."	Shamshad Begum	Majrooh Sultanpuri
"Thandi Hawa, Kaali Ghata, Aa Hi Gayi Jhoom Ke..."	Shamshad Begum and Geeta Dutt	Majrooh Sultanpuri
"Meri Duniya Lutt Rahi Thi Aur Main Khamosh Thha..."	Mohammed Rafi	Majrooh Sultanpuri
"Ae Ji, Dil Par Hua Aisa Jaadu, Tabiyat Badal Badal Gayi..."	Mohammed Rafi	Majrooh Sultanpuri
"Chal Diye Banda Nawaz, Chhor Kar Mere Dil Ka Saaz..."	Mohammed Rafi and Geeta Dutt	Majrooh Sultanpuri
"Udhar Tum Haseen Ho, Idhar Mein Jawan, Yeh Rangeen Raaton Ki Ek Dastaan Hai..."	Mohammed Rafi and Geeta Dutt	Majrooh Sultanpuri
"Jaane Kahan Mera Jigar Gaya Ji, Abhi Abhi Yehi Thha Kidhar Gaya Ji..."	Mohammed Rafi and Geeta Dutt	Majrooh Sultanpuri

== Reception ==
=== Box office ===
Mr. & Mrs. '55 was the fifth highest-grossing Indian film of 1955. It earned ₹17.5 million (US$190,000) at the box office, generating a large profit of ₹9 million (US$96,000).

=== Critical reception ===
A Times of India review, dated 1 May 1955, carried the headline: "Guru Dutt's Mr. And Mrs. 55 Slick Delightful Picture".

Filmfare, in its May 1955 issue quoted : "A thoroughly delightful, honey and cream social comedy. Mr. & Mrs. '55 is a model of film craft and has gripping interest for every class of cinegoer. Its satire of characters we know and its incidents taken from life are spiced with humour... the dialogue, well-written, tense and witty, enhances the appeal of this true-to-life and thought-provoking entertainer."

Harneet Singh of The Indian Express wrote, "The film rides on Madhubala's impish charm and breezy comic timing, Johnny Walker's one-liners, O. P. Nayyar's evergreen music and Dutt's lyrical direction, replete with long tracking shots, close-ups and cinematographer V. K. Murthy's exquisite shadow-and-light framing [...] Mr. and Mrs. 55 is a great ride till the time the film doesn't go all sanskari. Alvi's dialogues are the star of the narrative. The banter is funny, lifelike and refreshingly non-filmi."

Malavika Rajkotia writes that the film "reflects the social anxiety the Bill [caused] from its very onset", and that "sixty years later the film is still charming", despite the "unkind portrayal of the feminist represented by Lalita Pawar".

== See also ==
- Miss 56 (1956), Pakistani film inspired by Mr. & Mrs. '55
- Hindu code bills, depicted in the film
