= Kaveree Bamzai =

Indian journalist, author and film critic

- Born: India
- Occupation(s): Film critic, journalist

Kaveree Bamzai is an Indian journalist, author and film critic. She is the only woman to have been the editor of India Today magazine, where she worked for 30 years. She worked for The Times of India and The Indian Express before. She has been Editor-at-large for India Today since 2014. Her book, No Regrets, received positive reviews. So did The Three Khan, written about the three Khans of Bollywood.

== Bibliography ==
- Bamzai, Kaveree (2007). Bollywood Today. Lustre Press, Roli Books. ISBN 978-81-7436-507-1.
- Bamzai, Kaveree (2007). Bollywood Heute. Weltbild. ISBN 978-3-8289-8870-5.
- Bamzai, Kaveree; Bose, Mihir (2007). Bollywood: A History. Lotus Collection, Roli Books. ISBN 978-81-7436-508-8.
- Bamzai, Kaveree (2009). Madhuri Dixit - a Woman of Her Times. Zubaan.
- Bamzai, Kaveree (2009). Saira Banu - the Winsome Beauty. Zubaan.
- Bamzai, Kaveree (25 September 2019). No Regrets: The Guilt-Free Woman's Guide to a Good Life. HarperCollins India Publishers Pvt Limited. ISBN 978-93-5357-142-9.
- Bamzai, Kaveree (2021). The Three Khans and the Emergence of New India. Westland. ISBN 978-93-90679-95-9.
