= A. R. Rahman: The Musical Storm =

Biography of an Indian music composer

- Author: Kamini Mathai
- Language: English
- Subject: A. R. Rahman
- Genre: Biography
- Published: 18 June 2009
- Publisher: Viking Press
- Publication place: India
- Media type: Print
- Pages: 265
- ISBN: 978-06-70083-71-8
- OCLC: 762648108

A. R. Rahman: The Musical Storm is a biography of the Indian music composer A. R. Rahman by the journalist Kamini Mathai. The book was released on 18 June 2009 by Penguin Books' subsidiary Viking Press and became a commercial success. Consisting of thirteen chapters, it describes Rahman's birth in Madras (present-day Chennai) in 1967, his 27-year-long musical career, and his marriage in 1995 to Saira Banu, with whom he has three children.

Mathai was appointed by Penguin Books in early 2003 to write a biography on Rahman. In March the same year, she started contacting him through e-mails. He responded nearly one year later, and their first meeting happened the following six and seven months. In her writing process, she also met nearly other 100 people, including his family members and his colleagues. Critical reception of the book was mostly positive, with Mathai's writing and its contents getting the most attention.

== Summary ==
The book is written in a nonlinear narrative. It opens by describing Rahman winning the Best Original Score and the Best Original Song trophies for his composition in Slumdog Millionaire (2008) at the 81st Academy Awards. It then chronicles his early years and early career, including his birth in 1967 in Madras (now Chennai) and his debut as a music director with the Tamil-language romantic drama Roja (1992), which would be his first of many collaborations with the director Mani Ratnam. The book also discusses his Bollywood debut with Ram Gopal Varma's comedy-drama Rangeela (1995), his marriage to Saira Banu in 1995. The book further chronicles his conversion from Hinduism to Islam.

== Background and release ==
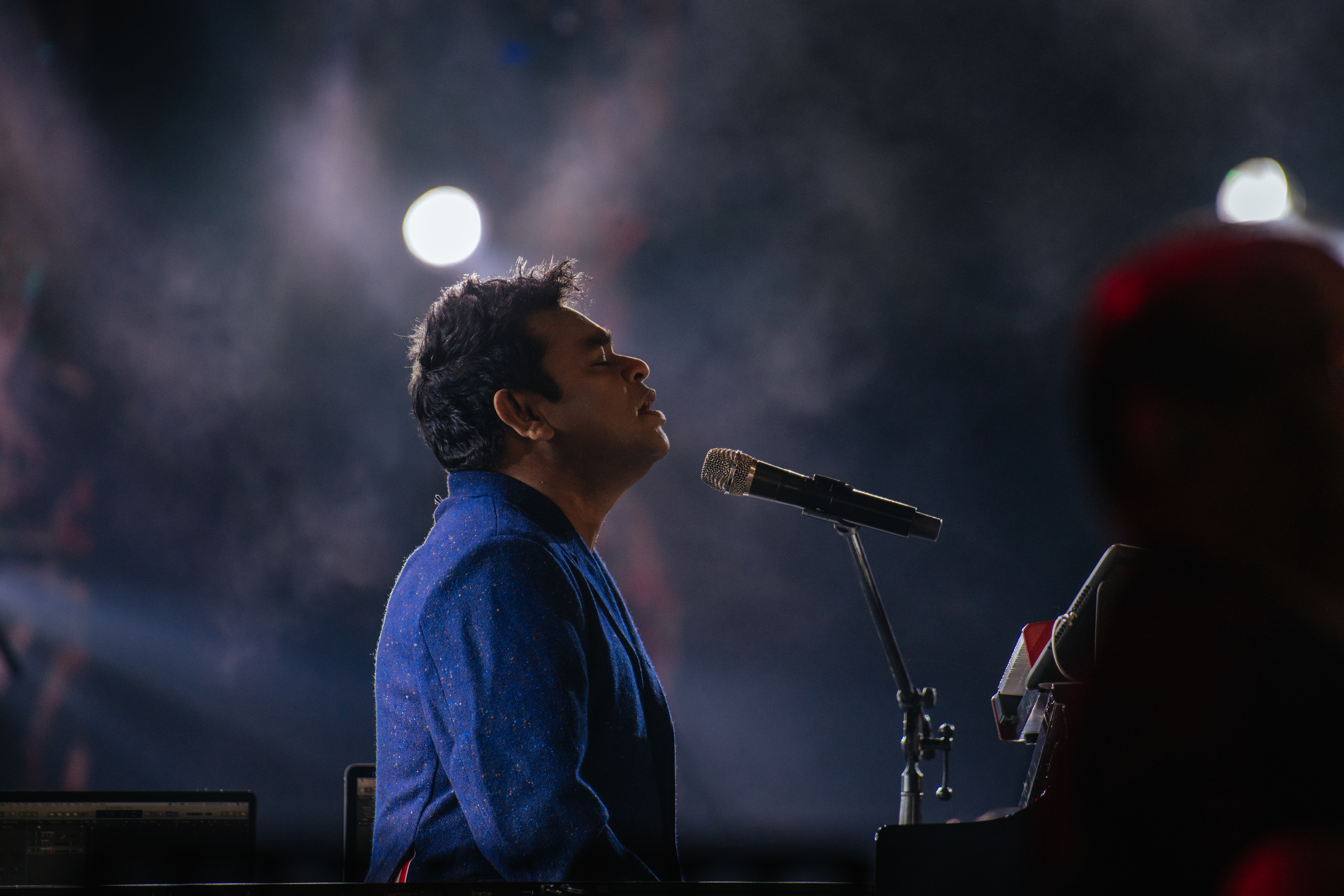
A. R. Rahman (pictured) was able to respond to Kamini Mathai's e-mails after nearly a year

Kamini Mathai is a Chennai-based journalist working for The New Indian Express, The Indian Express, and The Times of India. In 2003, she and other journalists were contacted by Penguin Books to write a biography on A. R. Rahman, and Mathai was ultimately chosen to write it. Although she accepted the offer, she had never been a fan of Rahman and did not know much about him. Mathai called writing the book a rough task since he was really busy at the time and unable to meet her easily. Rahman's friends told her that emailing him was the only way to interact with him. Mathai first e-mailed Rahman the same year when he was on a world concert tour.

Mathai kept following up periodically until Rahman finally responded to her in ten or eleven months, and their first meeting occurred within the following six and seven months. "[You] have to be really, really close to him to finally get him to open up. He is very guarded about his past, about everything. So, I had to have eight paragraphs of information and then ask, 'Is this true, or why did you say this?', then he would open up. You have to be specific", she said. In her research, Mathai also spoke to nearly 100 people, including his sisters—Reihana, Ishraat, and Fatima—though none of whom gave her much needed information. Mathai also met Rahman's mother and his colleagues. She revealed that hardest parts of her research were to collect information on his father, R. K. Narayan, and Rahman's early years.

Following a six-year research period, the book was published by Viking Press on 18 June 2009 on Amazon Kindle. Entitled A. R. Rahman: The Musical Storm, it marked Mathai's debut as a biographer as well as the first book on Rahman. Reports from the Press Trust of India mistakenly suggested that the book was an authorised one. Mathai clarified that it was not and added that before its publishing, she had sent him several chapters from the book but he had not had had the time to read them. Two years later, Rahman confirmed that he had not read Mathai's book, so it was unauthorised by him. A. R. Rahman: The Musical Storm was a commercial success and debuted at the fourth position in The Hindu's non-fiction best seller list in their 7 July 2009 issue. The book was released on hardcover on 20 December and its paperback version was released on 26 May 2010.

== Critical reception ==
The book has received positive critical acclaim, with praises directed towards the content and the writing. A review in Bollywood Hungama concluded, "In spite of apparent limitations that Kamini must have faced due to lack of extensive conversations with the man himself and the challenges that she would have faced to get to the bottom of the affairs when it came to certain controversies and clarifications, [it] still turns out to be a good and a detailed read." Deepa Ganesh of The Hindu described the book as an "anecdotal biography", further saying that its nonlinear narrative makes the work an "engaging book" that "humanises the deified Rahman", and critic in Dawn newspaper described Mathai's book as "a balanced biography." Writing for Madras Musings, Savitha Gautam said the book made its readers "a little closer to Rahman, the person, but at the end you realise that he continues to be an enigma. And that's what makes the read interesting!"

The Book Review's Safeeq Valanchery believed Mathai succeeded "in giving us a feel" about Rahman's early life and background. Kaveree Bamzai of the India Today magazine likened the book with a "cut-rate [crème brûlée]", which is "crunchy on top and not gooey enough inside, and added that there is "a tendency to hang quotes like on an untidy clothesline". S. Anand from Outlook called it "a string of quotes", but thought that she was still unable to "unravel the 'mystery' behind Rahman's music". The film critic Sudhish Kamath elaborated: "Kamini Mathai's A.R. Rahman: The Musical Storm is full of such anecdotes that attempt to demystify one of the most enigmatic popular culture icons of our time." Mint's Lalitha Suhasini complimented Mathai's research for the book, and said if there is one thing missing in the book, it is Rahman's "soul". S. Subramanian from the Emirati newspaper The National, felt Mathai's writing is "so promising and generous with detail".

== Publication history ==
Region	Release date	Format
India	18 June 2009	Amazon Kindle
India	20 December 2009	Hardcover
India	26 May 2010	Paperback

== Sources ==
- Anand, S. (3 August 2009). "Medley Messiah". Outlook. Archived from the original on 22 August 2016.
- Bamzai, Kaveree (25 June 2009). "Book: An Oscar encore". India Today. Archived from the original on 11 April 2021.
- "Bestsellers". The Hindu. Hyderabad, India. 7 July 2009.
- "Book review: A.R. Rahman – The Musical Storm". Bollywood Hungama. 20 August 2009. Archived from the original on 13 September 2021.
- Ganesh, Deepa (4 February 2010). "The case of a curious keyboardist". The Hindu.
- Gautam, Savitha (1–15 July 2009). "Meet Lata Mangeshkar and A.R. Rahman". Madras Musings. Archived from the original on 16 January 2011.
- Kamath, Sudhish (30 June 2009). "Demystifying A.R. Rahman". The Hindu.
- Mathai, Kamini (18 June 2009). A. R. Rahman: The Musical Storm. New Delhi, India: Viking Press. ASIN B06XXZJQFS.
- Mathai, Kamini (20 December 2009). A. R. Rahman: The Musical Storm. New Delhi, India: Viking Press. ASIN B01K3OT1X4.
- Mathai, Kamini (26 May 2010). A. R. Rahman: The Musical Storm. New Delhi, India: Viking Press. ISBN 978-06-70083-71-8.
- N., Patcy (9 June 2009). "A R Rahman, as you didn't know him". Rediff.com. Archived from the original on 3 July 2012.
- "Non-fiction: The melody maker". Dawn. 23 October 2011. Archived from the original on 18 October 2015.
- Raghavan, Nikhil (3 April 2011). "A lot's in a book". The Hindu.
- S., Divya (18 June 2010). "Maestro Rahman, the elusive genius". Daily News and Analysis. Archived from the original on 12 February 2021.
- Sivaramakrishnan, Vidya (26 June 2009). "'He always said he wasn't ready for a biography'". Mint.
- Subramanian, S. (14 August 2009). "God of score". The National. Abu Dhabi, United Arab Emirates.
- Suhasini, Lalitha (25 June 2009). "Pieces of the puzzle". Mint. Archived from the original on 13 September 2021.
- Valanchery, Safeeq (January 2010). "On a rich trail". The Book Review. Archived from the original on 13 September 2021.
