= Baharen Phir Bhi Aayengi =

- Theatrical release poster
- Directed by: Shaheed Latif
- Written by: Abrar Alvi (story, screenplay and dialogues)
- Based on: President by Nitin Bose
- Produced by: Guru Dutt
- Starring: Dharmendra; Mala Sinha; Tanuja
- Cinematography: K. G. Prabhakar
- Edited by: Y. G. Chawhan
- Music by: O. P. Nayyar
- Production company: Guru Dutt Productions
- Release date: 1966
- Running time: 136 minutes
- Country: India
- Language: Hindi

Baharen Phir Bhi Aayengi (transl. Spring will still come) is a 1966 Hindi-language romantic-tragedy film produced by Guru Dutt and directed by Shaheed Latif. It stars Dharmendra, Mala Sinha and Tanuja in the lead roles, supported by Rehman, Deven Verma and Johnny Walker. The film's music is by O. P. Nayyar and lyrics by Sheven Rizvi, Aziz Kashmiri, and cinematography by K.G. Prabhakar. It is an adaptation of the 1937 film President.

== Plot ==
Jeetendra Gupta is a reporter working in a newspaper company in Calcutta, and lives with his older widowed sister, his niece and his best-friend Chunnilal. Jeetendra exposes dangerous working conditions in a mine owned by one of his employer's crooked creditors and consequently loses his job. Jeeten is out looking for another job when he comes across Sunita, who was about to commit suicide by jumping from the same train that night after a prank played by Vikram Verma. Jeeten prevents her from jumping and they take shelter in a hut nearby. They leave for their respective homes the next day after Sunita mistakenly thinks Jeeten's name was Chunnilal. When disaster strikes at the mine (as predicted by Jeeten), Amita, managing director of the newspaper and daughter of the paper's deceased founder realized her mistake and re-employs him as the editor of the newspaper. However, her interest in him is more than just journalism as she gradually starts developing feelings towards him.

Meanwhile, Sunita has started developing feelings for Jeeten (who she thinks is Chunnilal) and writes him a letter asking him to meet her. Jeeten finally meets Sunita and reciprocates Sunita's feelings for him and they fall in love with each other. They keep dating for some time. On one weekend, Jeeten comes to Sunita's house only to realise that Amita is Sunita's older sister.

Shortly afterwards, the Indo-China war takes place and Jeeten decides to travel to Tezpur to report about the Indian Army's bravery in holding off the Chinese forces there. Amita goes to find Jeeten only to see him and Sunita together in each other's arms. She becomes heartbroken but still wants her sister to be happy with Jeeten. Meanwhile, Jeeten finds a damaged bridge which broke within a year of its construction. He learns that the same people who financed the mine were behind this and gathers evidence to publish. The creditors are enraged and want Jeeten to be removed from the company. Mr. Verma, elder brother of Vikram, reveals to Jeeten that Amita owed lots of money to the same creditors and Jeeten, in order to save Amita, leaves his job. Amita becomes desperate to bring him back and when confronted by Mr. Verma, she reveals that she is in love with Jeeten. Sunita overhears this and is devastated. She leaves the house to marry Vikram in order to let her sister be with Jeeten. She even lies to Jeeten to make it easier for him to move on from her.

Amita gradually starts losing her mind to the point she became completely insane. She learns that Sunita knew about her love for Jeeten and that Sunita left to leave Jeeten for her. This makes her go completely crazy as she tried to stop Sunita from marrying Vikram, who she didn't approve of. She locks herself in her father's old office while speaking to herself. While at Vikram's house, Sunita finds a photo of Amita in Mr. Verma's room which made her realise that he was in love with Amita all this time. Meanwhile, the corrupt creditors along with the board of directors were on the verge of usurping the company from Amita. Jeeten, Sunita and Mr. Verma are searching for Amita but are too late as they found her laying on the floor after she suffered a heart attack. In her dying moments, she confessed to Jeeten that she loves him and that her father's old office was not leased to the creditors and it would serve as the foundation for their new company. After ensuring the union of Jeeten and Sunita, she dies in their presence.

== Cast ==
- Dharmendra as Jeetendra Gupta "Jeeten" (Sunita's boyfriend)
- Mala Sinha as Amita (Sunita's elder sister and Jeetendra's boss)
- Tanuja as Sunita "Babli" (Amita's younger sister and Jeetendra's girlfriend)
- Rehman as Mr. Verma
- Deven Verma as Vikram Verma
- Johnny Walker as Chunnilal (Jeetendra's friend)
- Rebecca Madhuri Premlata Putta (Madhavi) as Ruby Chatterjee
- Mumtaz Begum as Jeetendra's elder sister
- Badri Prasad as Mr. Shukla

== Production ==
The film started with Guru Dutt in the lead. He was replaced by Dharmendra and the film was re-shot due to Dutt's death.

== Music and soundtrack ==
The music of the film was composed by O. P. Nayyar. The lyrics were penned by Aziz Kashmiri, Kaifi Azmi, Anjaan, S. H. Bihari and Shevan Rizvi.

S. D. Burman started out as the composer for this film. But he suffered a heart attack, Producer Gurudutt also was in hurry to complete film as he was also feeling unwell so due to which Guru Dutt replaced him with O. P. Nayyar. Eventually Gurudutt died without completing the movei. the songs, which Burman recorded in Mohammed Rafi's voice as a title song wasn't accepted by OPNaiyyar and he gave it new tune. Thus it was kept by Burman and after his recovery, and since it was not used in the film, Some years later, Burman rerecorded the song as 'Yeh Dil Na Hota Bechara' from Jewel Thief (1967) in the voice of Kishore Kumar.

| Song | Singer | Raga |
|---|---|---|
| "Badal Jaaye Agar Maali" | Mahendra Kapoor | |
| "Aapke Haseen Rukh Pe" | Mohammed Rafi | |
| "Suno Suno Miss Chatterjee" | Mohammed Rafi, Asha Bhosle | |
| "Dil To Pehle Hi Se Madhosh Hai" | Mohammed Rafi, Asha Bhosle | |
| "Koi Kehde Zamane Se Jaake" | Asha Bhosle | |
| "Woh Hanske Mile Humse" | Asha Bhosle | Kalyan |
| "Badal Jaaye Agar Maali - Sad" | Asha Bhosle | |
