= Guru Dutt =

Indian filmmaker and actor (1925–1964)

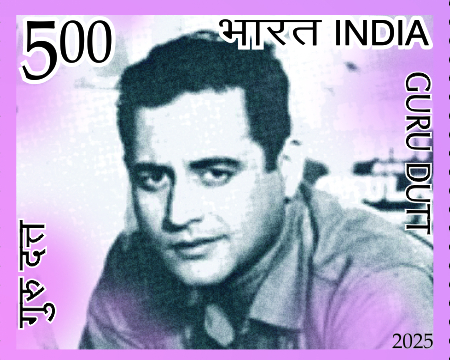
- Dutt on a 2025 stamp of india
- Born: Vasanth Kumar Shivashankar Padukone; 9 July 1925; Bangalore, Kingdom of Mysore, British India (present-day Karnataka, India)
- Died: 10 October 1964 (aged 39); Bombay, Maharashtra, India (present-day Mumbai)
- Other name: Gurudatta Padukone
- Occupations: Actor; film producer; film director; choreographer
- Years active: 1946–1964
- Spouse: Geeta Ghosh Roy Chowdhuri (m. 1953)
- Children: 3
- Relatives: Atma Ram (brother); Lalita Lajmi (sister); Kalpana Lajmi (niece); Shyam Benegal (cousin)

Guru Dutt (born Vasanth Kumar Shivashankar Padukone; 9 July 1925 – 10 October 1964; also known as Gurudatta Padukone) was an Indian film actor, director, producer, choreographer, and writer. He is regarded as one of the greatest filmmakers of Indian cinema. He was heavily influenced by Alfred Hitchcock in his initial films and later was compared with Orson Welles due to his works getting a legitimate amount of prominence amongst the cinephiles.

Dutt was lauded for his artistry, notably his usage of close-up shots, lighting, and depictions of melancholia. He directed a total of eight Hindi films, several of which have gained a cult following internationally. This includes Pyaasa (1957), which made its way onto Time magazine's 100 Greatest Movies list, as well as Kaagaz Ke Phool (1959), all of which are frequently listed among the greatest films in Hindi cinema. He was included among CNN's "Top 25 Asian Actors" in 2012.

== Early life ==
Vasanth Kumar Shivashankar Padukone was born on 9 July 1925, in Bangalore in the present-day state of Karnataka in India into a Konkani Chitrapur Saraswat Brahmin family. His name was changed to Gurudatta Padukone following a childhood accident, the belief being that it was an auspicious choice. His father, Shivashanker Rao Padukone, was a headmaster and a banker; his mother was Vasanthi, a teacher and writer. Dutt spent his early childhood in Bhowanipore, Kolkata, and spoke fluent Bengali.

He had one younger sister—Lalita Lajmi, who was an Indian painter—and three younger brothers, Atma Ram (a director), Devi (a producer), and Vijay. Likewise, his niece Kalpana Lajmi was also a well known Indian film director, producer and screenwriter. His second cousin Shyam Benegal was a director and screenwriter. His second cousin twice removed is Amrita Rao, whose grandfather and Dutt were second cousins.

== Career ==
=== Early career ===
Beginning in 1942, he studied at Uday Shankar's School of Dancing and Choreography in Almora, but was taken out in 1944 after getting involved with the company's leading lady. From there, gaining employment as a telephone operator at a Lever Brothers factory in Calcutta (now Kolkata), Dutt wired home to say he had got the job. However, soon after, he was disenchanted by the job and left it.

Dutt briefly returned to his parents in Bombay before his uncle found him a job under a 3-year contract with the Prabhat Film Company in Pune later that year. This once-leading production company had already seen the departure of its best talent, V. Shantaram, who had by then launched his own production company called Rajkamal Kalamandir. At Prabhat Dutt met actors Rehman and Dev Anand, who became lifelong friends and the latter of whom would later go on to produce Dutt's directorial debut.

In 1945, Dutt made his acting debut in Vishram Bedekar's Lakhrani (1945), as Lachman, a minor role. In 1946, he worked as an assistant director and choreographed dances for P. L. Santoshi's film, Hum Ek Hain, in which Dev Anand made his acting debut.

While his contract with Prabhat ended in 1947, Dutt's mother got him a job as a freelance assistant with the company's CEO, Baburao Pai. Dutt once again lost his job after getting involved with the assistant dancer, Vidya, whom he eloped with as she already had a fiancé (Vidya's fiancé threatened police action, after which, the matter was resolved.) From there, Dutt was unemployed for almost 10 months and stayed with his family at Matunga in Bombay. During this time, Dutt developed a flair for writing in English and wrote short stories for The Illustrated Weekly of India, a local weekly English language magazine.

=== Breakthrough ===
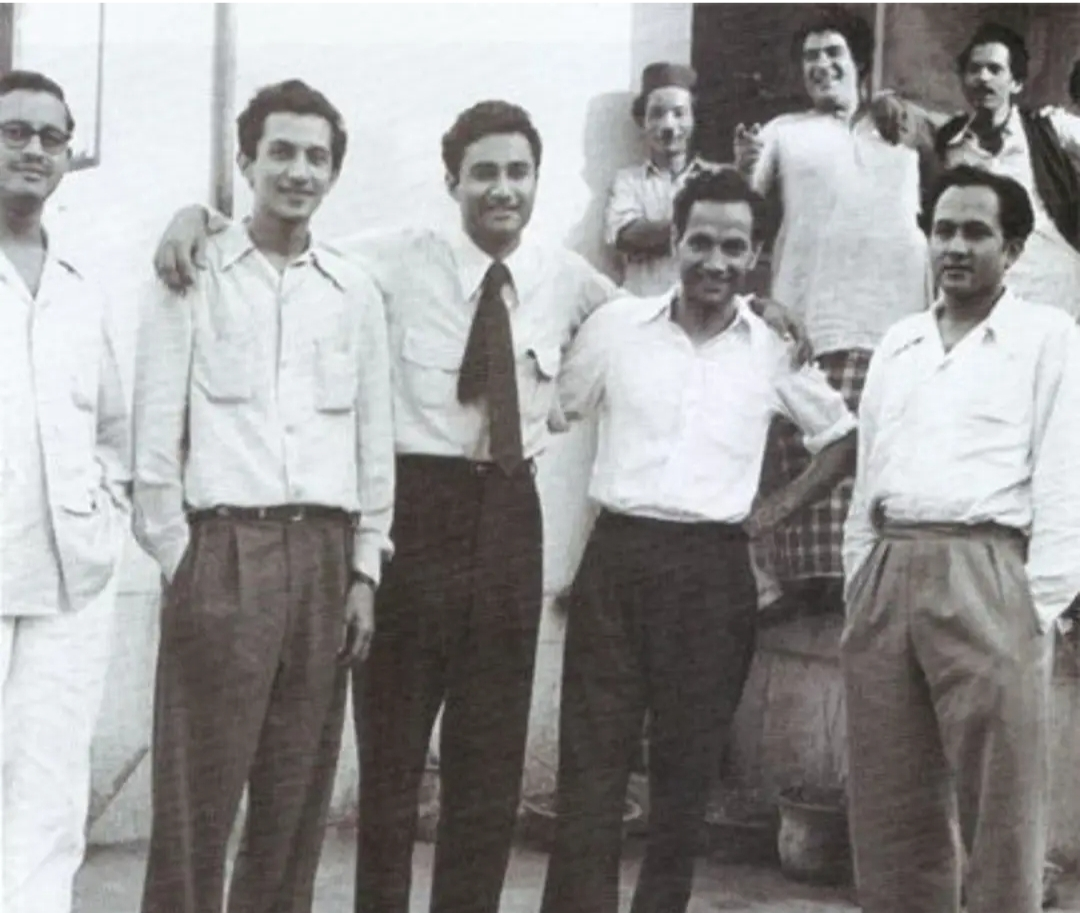
Dutt, Dev Anand, and other co-workers in the set of Jaal (1952).

After his time with Prabhat failed in 1947, Dutt moved to Bombay, where he worked with two leading directors of the time: Amiya Chakravarty in Girls' School (1949); and Gyan Mukherjee in the Bombay Talkies film Sangram (1950). Around this time, Dev Anand offered Dutt a job as a director in his new company, Navketan. Back in their time at Prabhat while both still new to the industry, Anand and Dutt reached an agreement that if Dutt were to become a filmmaker, he would hire Anand as his hero, and if Anand were to produce a film, he would use Dutt as its director. Keeping that promise, the duo made two super-hit films together in a row.

First, Anand hired Dutt for Baazi (1951), starring Anand himself and marking Dutt's directorial debut. With its morally ambiguous hero, the transgressing siren, and shadow lighting, the film was a tribute to the 1940s film noir genre of Hollywood, and defined the noir genre for the following decade in Bollywood. Baazi, which was an immediate success, was followed by Jaal (1952), also directed by Dutt and starring Anand, and was again successful at the box office.

Dutt went on to cast Anand in C.I.D. (1956). After Dutt's death, Anand said that "He was a young man, he should not have made depressing pictures." Creative differences between Dutt, and Chetan Anand (Anand's elder brother), who was also a director, made future collaborations difficult.

For his next project, Dutt directed and starred in Baaz (1953). Though the film did not perform very well at the box office, it brought together what would be known as the Guru Dutt team, who performed well in subsequent films. The team included various filmmakers discovered and mentored by Dutt, including: Johnny Walker (actor-comedian), V.K. Murthy (cinematographer), Abrar Alvi (writer-director), Raj Khosla (writer), Waheeda Rehman (actress), among others. Dutt's next films, however, were blockbusters: Aar Paar in 1954; Mr. & Mrs. '55 in 1955; C.I.D. then Sailaab in 1956; and Pyaasa in 1957. Dutt played the lead role in three of these five films.

In 1959 came the release of Dutt's Kaagaz Ke Phool, the first Indian film produced in CinemaScope. Despite the innovation, Kaagaz—about a famous director (played by Dutt) who falls in love with an actress (played by Waheeda Rehman, Dutt's real-life love interest)—was an intense disappointment at the box office. All subsequent films from his studio were, thereafter, officially headed by other directors, since Dutt felt that his name was anathema to the box office. It would be the only film produced by Dutt that was considered a box office disaster, for which Dutt lost over Rs. 17 lakh, a large amount by the standards of that time.

=== Later films ===
In 1960, Dutt's team released Chaudhvin Ka Chand, directed by M. Sadiq and starring Dutt alongside Waheeda Rehman and Rehman. The film was a box-office smash hit, and more than recovered Dutt's losses from Kaagaz. The film's title track, "Chaudhvin Ka Chand Ho", is in a special colour sequence and is the only time one can see Guru Dutt in colour.

In 1962, his team released Sahib Bibi Aur Ghulam, a critically successful film which was directed by Dutt's protégé, Abrar Alvi, who won the Filmfare Best Director Award for the film. The film starred Dutt and Meena Kumari, along with Rehman and Waheeda Rehman in supporting roles.

In 1964, Dutt acted opposite Meena Kumari in his last film, Sanjh Aur Savera, directed by Hrishikesh Mukherjee. After his death in October 1964, he left several films incomplete. He was cast as the lead in K Asif's film Love and God but was replaced by Sanjeev Kumar when the film was revived years later. He was also working opposite Sadhana in Picnic which was left incomplete and shelved.

He was set to produce and star in Baharen Phir Bhi Aayengi but was replaced as the lead by Dharmendra and the film released in 1966 as his last film as a producer.

== Personal life ==
In 1953, Dutt married Geeta Roy Chowdhuri (later, Geeta Dutt), a well-known playback singer whom he met during the making of Baazi (1951). The couple had been engaged for three years, overcoming a great deal of family opposition in order to marry. After marriage, in 1956, they moved to a bungalow in Pali Hill, Mumbai. They eventually had three children, Tarun, Arun, and Nina; after the death of Guru and Geeta, the children grew up in the homes of Guru's brother Atma Ram and Geeta's brother Mukul Roy.

Dutt had an unhappy marital life. According to Atma Ram, he was "a strict disciplinarian as far as work was concerned, but totally undisciplined in his personal life." He smoked and drank heavily and kept odd hours. Dutt's relationship with actress Waheeda Rehman also worked against their marriage. At the time of his death, he had separated from Geeta and was living alone. Geeta Dutt died in 1972 at age 41, after excessive drinking, which resulted in liver damage.

== Death ==
On 10 October 1964, Dutt was found dead in his bed in his rented apartment at Pedder Road in Bombay. He is said to have been mixing alcohol and sleeping pills. His death may have been suicide, or just an accidental overdose. If the former is true, it would have been his third suicide attempt.

Dutt's son, Arun, considered the death to be an accident. Dutt had scheduled appointments for the next day with actress Mala Sinha and actor Raj Kapoor for his movie Baharen Phir Bhi Aayengi, to discuss the making of colour films. According to Arun: "My father had sleeping disorders and popped sleeping pills like any other person. That day he was drunk and had taken an overdose of pills, which culminated in his death. It was a lethal combination of excessive liquor and sleeping pills."

At the time of his death, Dutt was involved in two other projects: Picnic, starring actress Sadhana; and director K. Asif's epic, Love and God. Picnic remained incomplete and the latter was released two decades later as it was entirely reshot, with Sanjeev Kumar replacing Dutt in the leading role.

Twelve years after his death, his mother, Vasanthi Padukone, published her biography (1976) in Kannada, titled ನನ್ನ ಮಗ ಗುರುದತ್ತ: ಜೀವನ-ಚರಿತ್ರೆ (Nanna Maga Gurudatta: Jeevana-Charitre; My Son Gurudatta: Life-Story).

== Legacy ==
=== Success ===
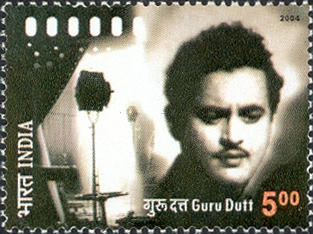
Dutt on a 2004 Indian stamp.

Contrary to a general belief about the viability of his film projects, Dutt more or less produced commercially successful films. Over the years the commercial nature of his projects saw a trade-off with his creative aspirations. Movies such as C.I.D., Baazi, Pyaasa, Kaagaz Ke Phool, Chaudhvin Ka Chand and Sahib Bibi Aur Ghulam were the first of their kind in Hindi cinema.

The only film produced by Dutt that was considered a box office disaster was Kaagaz Ke Phool, which is now a cult classic. The extra-feature on the DVD of Kaagaz Ke Phool has a three-part Channel 4-produced documentary on the life and works of Dutt titled In Search of Guru Dutt.

He, along with Raj Kapoor, Mehboob Khan and Bimal Roy, was one of the few Indian film directors able to achieve a healthy blend of artistic and commercial success between the mid-1950s and mid-1960s. His brother Atma Ram dedicated his 1969 directorial Chanda Aur Bijli to him.

=== Honours ===
Dutt is known as a director who used his imagination in relation to light and shade, his evocative imagery, and a striking ability to weave multiple thematic layers into his narratives.

He was inducted into the Walk of the Stars, at Bandra Bandstand, where his autograph was actually preserved.

Both Kaagaz Ke Phool and Pyaasa have been included among the greatest films of all time, as well as on Sight & Sound magazine's 2002 "Top Films Survey", which polled over 250 international film critics and directors. In 2005, Pyaasa made its way on to Time magazine's All-Time 100 Movies list. In 2010, Dutt was included among CNN's "Top 25 Asian Actors of all time".

A postage stamp featuring Dutt was released by India Post on 11 October 2004. On 10 October 2011, a Doordarshan documentary on Dutt aired. In 2021, author Yasser Usman published a biographical book about him, titled Guru Dutt: An Unfinished Story.

The 56th International Film Festival of India taking place from 20 to 28 November 2025, will celebrate centenary and pay tribute to Guru Dutt by screening his classic films.

== Filmography ==
| Year | Title | Director | Producer | Writer |
|---|---|---|---|---|
| 1951 | Baazi | Yes | No | No |
| 1952 | Jaal | Yes | No | Yes |
| 1953 | Baaz | Yes | No | Yes |
| 1954 | Aar Paar | Yes | Yes | No |
| 1955 | Mr. & Mrs. '55 | Yes | Yes | No |
| 1956 | C.I.D. | No | Yes | No |
| 1956 | Sailaab | Yes | No | No |
| 1957 | Pyaasa | Yes | Yes | Yes |
| 1959 | Kaagaz Ke Phool | Yes | Yes | No |
| 1960 | Chaudhvin Ka Chand | No | Yes | No |
| 1962 | Sahib Bibi Aur Ghulam | No | Yes | No |
| 1966 | Baharen Phir Bhi Aayengi | No | Yes | No |

Acting credits

| Year | Title | Role | Notes |
|---|---|---|---|
| 1945 | Lakharani | —N/a | Choreographer only |
| 1946 | Hum Ek Hain | —N/a | choreographer and assistant director only |
| 1953 | Baaz | Prince Ravi | |
| 1954 | Aar Paar | Kalu Birju | |
| 1955 | Mr. & Mrs. '55 | Preetam Kumar | |
| 1957 | Pyaasa | Vijay | |
| 1958 | 12 O'Clock | Advocate Ajay Kumar | |
| 1959 | Kaagaz Ke Phool | Suresh Sinha | |
| 1960 | Chaudhvin Ka Chand | Aslam | |
| 1962 | Sahib Bibi Aur Ghulam | Atulya Chakraborty / Bhoothnath | |
| 1962 | Sautela Bhai | Gokul | |
| 1963 | Bharosa | Bansi | |
| 1963 | Bahurani | Raghu | |
| 1964 | Suhagan | Professor Vijay Kumar | |
| 1964 | Sanjh Aur Savera | Dr. Shankar Chaudhary | |
| 1964 | Picnic | | |
| 1983 | Film Hi Film | Himself | Posthumous archival-footage appearance |

== Awards and nominations ==
| Year | Film | Award | Category | Result | Refs. |
|---|---|---|---|---|---|
| 1963 | Sahib Bibi Aur Ghulam | BFJA Awards | Best Actor (Hindi) | Won | |
| 1963 | Sahib Bibi Aur Ghulam | Filmfare Awards | Best Film | Won | |
| 1963 | Sahib Bibi Aur Ghulam | Filmfare Awards | Best Actor | Nominated | |
| 1963 | Sahib Bibi Aur Ghulam | National Film Awards | Best Feature Film in Hindi (Note: With Abrar Alvi.) | Won | |

== Bibliography ==
- Kabir, Nasreen Munni (1996). Guru Dutt: A Life in Cinema. Oxford University Press. ISBN 978-01-95638-49-3.
- Kabir, Nasreen Munni (2006). Yours Guru Dutt. Roli Books. ISBN 978-81-74363-88-6.
- Saran, Sathya (2008). Ten Years with Guru Dutt: Abrar Alvi's Journey. Penguin Books India. ISBN 978-01-43416-92-0.
- Usman, Yasser (2021). Guru Dutt: An Unfinished Story. Simon & Schuster. ISBN 978-93-86797-89-6.

== See also ==
- Films directed by Guru Dutt
- Guru Dutt Films
- Guru Dutt team
