= In Search of Guru Dutt =

- Directed by: Nasreen Munni Kabir
- Starring: Abrar Alvi; Kaifi Azmi; Waheeda Rehman; Raj Khosla; V.K. Murthy; Dev Anand; Johnny Walker
- Release date: 1989
- Running time: 84 minutes
- Countries: United Kingdom; India

In Search of Guru Dutt is a 1989 three-part documentary film on the life and work of Indian actor, writer, director and producer of Hindi films Guru Dutt to mark his 25th death anniversary.

This documentary is a three-part tribute to director Guru Dutt, who died in 1964 at the age of 39. The work traces Guru Dutt's personal story through many interviews with his family members and colleagues and observes his work through the use of extensive film excerpts. The documentary was produced by the British television network Channel 4 producer Nasreen Munni Kabir.

== Home media ==
The documentary was released in a special collector's DVD pack in 2011 in honor of Guru Dutt's 86th birthday anniversary.
