= Nasreen Munni Kabir =

Indian television producer and director

Nasreen Munni Kabir (born 1950) is an India-born television producer, director and author based in the UK. She is best known for producing an annual season of films from Bollywood that aired on the British terrestrial television channel Channel 4.

Her work includes the 46-part series Movie Mahal, In Search of Guru Dutt, Follow that Star (a profile of Amitabh Bachchan), and Channel 4 series such as How To Make It Big in Bollywood & The Inner and Outer World of Shah Rukh Khan. She won the 1999 Women of Achievement Award in Arts & Culture in the UK and became a governor on the board of the British Film Institute in 2000, serving a six-year term.

Over the years, she has directed several documentaries and published 15 books on cinema, including five books featuring the dialogue of Indian celebrated classic films and book-length biographical conversations with personalities in the Hindi film industry, Javed Akhtar, Lata Mangeshkar, A.R. Rahman, Gulzar, and Waheeda Rehman. Her latest book is a biography of legendary tabla virtuoso Ustad Zakir Hussain.

== Early life and education ==
Born in Hyderabad, India, Kabir's parents moved to London when she was age three. She did her master's in cinema studies.

== Career ==
Kabir moved to Paris and lived there for 19 years, studying film and working as an assistant on various documentaries. She also worked with French film director Robert Bresson as his trainee assistant on the film FOUR NIGHTS OF A DREAMER. She also worked as a consultant with Pompidou Centre in Paris, where she organised two Indian film festivals in 1983/85. In 1982, she resettled in London where she began her current job as Channel 4 TV's consultant on Indian Films. In 1986, she directed and produced a 46-part television docu-series on Indian cinema titled Movie Mahal for Channel 4 TV UK. and other series on Hindi cinema.

In 2005, she produced a two-part documentary on Shahrukh Khan, The Inner and Outer World of Shah Rukh Khan. It featured the superstar's 2004 Temptations concert tour, the film contrasts Khan's "inner world" of family and daily life, with the "outer world" of his work. She continues to curate an annual season of Indian films for Channel 4 each year. She has also directed a six-part series for Channel 4 UK on the legendary playback singer Lata Mangeshkar called LATA IN HER OWN VOICE.

In April 2011, a book titled "A. R. Rahman The Spirit of Music" written based on the conversations with Nasreen Munni Kabir was released. Also in 2011, she produced Bismillah of Benares a documentary on shehnai maestro, Bismillah Khan. It was presented by A.R. Rahman's KM Musiq and distributed by Sony Music in India.

April 2014 saw the release of a book named 'Conversations with Waheeda Rehman' which was based on her conversations with Waheeda Rehman about the latter's life and work.

== Personal life ==
She lives in London.

== Filmography ==
- Movie Mahal (1986/88) 49-part TV series
- In Search of Guru Dutt (1989) 3-part
- The Inner and Outer World of Shah Rukh Khan (2005)
- Bismillah of Benares (2011)

== Bibliography ==
- Nasreen Munni Kabir (2001). Bollywood: The Indian Cinema Story. Channel 4 Books. ISBN 978-0-7522-1943-1.
- Nasreen Munni Kabir (2002). Talking Films: Conversations on Hindi Cinema with Javed Akhtar. Oxford University Press. ISBN 978-0-19-566462-1.
- Nasreen Munni Kabir (2005). Guru Dutt: a life in cinema. Oxford University Press. ISBN 978-0-19-567233-6.
- Nasreen Munni Kabir (2006). Yours Guru Dutt: intimate letters of a great Indian filmmaker. Lustre Press, Roli Books. ISBN 9788174363886.
- Nasreen Munni Kabir (2007). Talking Songs: Javed Akhtar in Conversation with Nasreen Munni Kabir. Oxford University Press. ISBN 978-0-19-568712-5.
- K. Asif; Nasreen Munni Kabir; Suhail Akhtar (2007). The immortal dialogue of K. Asif's Mughal-e-azam. Oxford University Press. ISBN 978-0-19-568496-4.
- Nasreen Munni Kabir (2009). Farah Khan. Zubaan.
- Nasreen Munni Kabir (2009). Lata Mangeshkar ...in Her Own Voice. Niyogi Books. ISBN 978-81-89738-41-9.
- Vajahat Mirza; S. Ali Raza; Suhail Akhtar; Vijay Jani, Nasreen Munni Kabir (2010). The Dialogue of Mother India: Mehboob Khan's Immortal Classic. Niyogi Books. ISBN 978-81-89738-58-7.
- Khwaja Ahmad Abbas; Vasant Sāthe; Suhail Akhtar; Vijay Jani, Nasreen Munni Kabir (2010). The Dialogue of Awaara: Raj Kapoor's Immortal Classic. Niyogi Books. ISBN 978-81-89738-54-9.
- Nasreen Munni Kabir (2011). A.R. Rahman: The Spirit of Music. Om Books International. ISBN 978-93-80070-14-8.
- Abrar Alvi; Vijay Jani; Suhail Akhtar; Nasreen Munni Kabir (2011). The Dialogue of Pyaasa: Guru Dutt's Immortal Classic. Om Books International. ISBN 978-93-80070-53-7.
- Nasreen Munni Kabir (2012). In the Company of a Poet: Gulzar in Conversation with Nasreen Munni Kabir. Rainlight. ISBN 978-81-291-2083-0.
- Rajinder Singh Bedi; Nasreen Munni Kabir (2012). The Dialogue of Devdas: Bimal Roy's Immortal Classic Based on the Bengali Novella by Sarat Chandra Chattopadhyay. Om Books International. ISBN 978-93-80069-88-3.
- Nasreen Munni Kabir (2012). A Sideways Glance at Hindi Cinema. Penguin Books India. ISBN 978-0-14-341936-5.
- Nasreen Munni Kabir (2014). Conversations with Waheeda Rehman. Penguin Books Limited. ISBN 978-93-5118-642-7.
- Kabir, Nasreen Munni (2018). Jiya Jale: The Stories of Songs. Speaking Tiger Books. ISBN 978-93-88070-95-9.
