= Bibliography of Hindi cinema =

This is a bibliography of notable books on Hindi cinema.

== Biographical ==
- Ahmed, Rauf (2016). Shammi Kapoor: The Game Changer. Om Books International, India. ISBN 978-93-85609-62-6.
- Manwani, Akshay (11 December 2013). Sahir Ludhianvi - The People's Poet. HarperCollins Publishers India. ISBN 978-93-5029-734-6.
- Nevile, Pran (2005). --and Pran: a biography. HarperCollins Publishers India, a joint venture with India Today Group, New Delhi. ISBN 978-93-5029057-6.
- Sharma, Kidar (2002). The One and Lonely Kidar Sharma, (an Anecdotal Autobiography). Bluejay Books. ISBN 978-81-87075-96-7.
- Nevile, Pran (11 May 2011). K. L. Saigal: The Definitive Biography. Penguin Books Limited. ISBN 978-93-5214-160-9.
- Premchand, Manek (2015). Talat Mahmood: The Velvet Voice. Manipal University Press, India. ISBN 978-93-82460-23-7.
- Devi, Kanan trans: Indranee Ghosh (27 June 2014). My Homage to All. Zubaan, India. ISBN 978-93-83074-94-5.
- Pradhan, Bharathi S. (2016). Anything But Khamosh: The Shatrughan Sinha Biography. Om Books International, India. ISBN 978-93-85609-59-6.
- Dave, Sunil Bandopadyay, Trans. Bakul (2006). Amitabh Bachchan. Gurjar Granthratna Karyalay. ISBN 978-81-89166-00-7.
- Bhawana Somaaya (1 January 1999). Amitabh Bachchan, the legend. Macmillan India Ltd. ISBN 978-0-333-93355-8.
- Desai, Kishwar (1 November 2007). Darlingji: the true love story of Nargis and Sunil Dutt. HarperCollins. ISBN 978-81-7223-697-7.
- Pinto, Jerry (2006). Helen: the life and times of an H-bomb. Penguin Books. ISBN 978-0-14-303124-6.
- Holt, Julia; Phalke, Shubhra (July 1995). Raj Kapoor. Basic Skills Agency. ISBN 978-1-85990-021-5.
- Khubchandani, Lata (1 January 2003). Raj Kapoor. Rupa & Co. ISBN 978-81-7167-816-7.
- Reuben, Bunny (1988). Raj Kapoor: the fabulous showman. Virgo.
- Ahmed, Rauf (1 January 2008). Mehboob Khan: the romance of history. Wisdom Tree. ISBN 978-81-8328-106-5.
- Zaveri, Hanif (1 January 2005). Mehmood, a man of many moods. Popular Prakashan. ISBN 978-81-7991-213-3.
- Chopra, Anupama (2007). King of Bollywood: Shah Rukh Khan and the Seductive World of Indian Cinema. Ameya Prakashan. ISBN 978-81-903514-6-1.
- Shiekh, Mushtaq (5 January 2007). Still Reading Khan. A1Books Distributor. ISBN 978-81-87107-79-8.
- Somaaya, Bhawana (2007). Hema Malini: the authorized biography. Lotus Collection. ISBN 978-81-7436-467-8.
- Mukherjee, Ram Kamal (1 January 2005). Hema Malini, diva unveiled. Magna Books. ISBN 978-81-7809-286-7.
- George, T. J. S. (December 1994). The life and times of Nargis. Megatechnics. ISBN 978-81-7223-149-1.
- Ghosh, Biswadeep (January 2004). Hall of fame, Aishwarya Rai. Magna Books. ISBN 978-81-7809-244-7.
- Usman, Yasser (5 December 2014). Rajesh Khanna: The Untold Story of India's First Superstar. Penguin Books. ISBN 978-9-351-18875-9.
- Usman, Yasser (29 August 2016). Rekha: The Untold Story. Juggernaut Books. ISBN 978-81-93284-18-6.
- Usman, Yasser (13 March 2018). Sanjay Dutt: The Crazy Untold Story of Bollywood's Bad Boy. Juggernaut Books. ISBN 978-81-93284-18-6.
- Usman, Yasser (7 January 2021). Guru Dutt: An Unfinished Story. Simon & Schuster. ISBN 978-93-86797-89-6.

== General ==
- Ramachandran, T. M. (June 1985). 70 years of Indian cinema, 1913–1983. CINEMA India-International. ISBN 978-0-86132-090-5.
- Manschot, Johan; Vos, Marijke de (2005). Behind the scenes of Hindi cinema: a visual journey through the heart of Bollywood. KIT. ISBN 9789068321869.
- Ganti, Tejaswini (2004). Bollywood: a guidebook to popular Hindi cinema. Routledge. ISBN 978-0-415-28853-8.
- Bose, Mihir (2006). Bollywood: a history. Tempus. ISBN 978-0-7524-2835-2.
- Omar, Fuad (17 June 2006). Bollywood: An Insider's Guide. Lulu.com. ISBN 978-1-84728-009-1.
- Mehta, Rini Bhattacharya; Pandharipande, Rajeshwari (1 January 2010). Bollywood and Globalization: Indian Popular Cinema, Nation, and Diaspora. Anthem Press. ISBN 978-1-84331-833-0.
- Mishra, Vijay (2002). Bollywood cinema: temples of desire. Routledge. ISBN 978-0-415-93015-4.
- Karanjia, B. K. (1986). A many-splendoured cinema. New Thacker's Fine Art Press.
- Kaur, Raminder; Sinha, Ajay J. (2005). Bollyworld: popular Indian cinema through a transnational lens. Sage Publications. ISBN 978-0-7619-3320-5.
- Dawar, Ramesh (1 January 2006). Bollywood: Yesterday, Today, Tomorrow. Star Publications. ISBN 978-1-905863-01-3.
- Silja (14 July 2006). Bollywood: The Passion of Indian Film and Music. Edel Classics, EAR Books. ISBN 978-3-937406-48-0.
- Gopalan, Lalitha (2002). Cinema of interruptions: action genres in contemporary Indian cinema. British Film Institute. ISBN 978-0-85170-923-9.
- Encyclopædia Britannica (India) Pvt. Ltd; Gulzar; Nihalani, Govind (2003). Encyclopaedia of Hindi Cinema. Popular Prakashan. ISBN 978-81-7991-066-5.
- Jha, Subhash K.; Bachchan, Amitabh (2005). The essential guide to Bollywood. Lustre Press. ISBN 978-81-7436-378-7.
- Kavoori, Anandam P.; Punathambekar, Aswin (August 2008). Global Bollywood. NYU Press. ISBN 978-0-8147-4798-8.
- Saari, Anil; Caṭṭopādhyāẏa, Pārtha (2009). Hindi cinema: an insider's view. Oxford University Press. ISBN 978-0-19-569584-7.
- Raheja, Dinesh; Kothari, Jitendra (1996). The hundred luminaries of Hindi cinema. India Book House Publishers. ISBN 978-81-7508-007-2.
- Krishnaswamy, Revathi; Hawley, John Charles (2008). The postcolonial and the global. U of Minnesota Press. pp. 200–. ISBN 978-0-8166-4609-8.
- Hogan, Patrick Colm (1 October 2008). Understanding Indian movies: culture, cognition, and cinematic imagination. University of Texas Press. ISBN 978-0-292-71786-2.
- Majumdar, Neepa (25 September 2009). Wanted cultured ladies only!: female stardom and cinema in India, 1930s–1950s. University of Illinois Press. ISBN 978-0-252-07628-2.
- Cooper, Darius (1 January 2005). In Black and White: Hollywood and the Melodrama of Guru Dutt. Seagull Books. ISBN 9788170462170.
- Narwekar, Sanjit (12 December 2012). Eena Meena Deeka: The Story of Hindi Film Comedy. Rupa Publications India Pvt. Ltd. ISBN 978-81-291-2625-2.
- Raghavendra, M.K. (12 October 2009). 50 Indian Film Classics. HarperCollins Publishers India. ISBN 978-81-7223-866-7.

== Specific films ==
- Chatterjee, Gayatri (2002). Mother India. British Film Institute. ISBN 978-0-85170-917-8.
- Asif, K.; Kabir, Nasreen Munni; Akhtar, Suhail (2007). The immortal dialogue of K. Asif's Mughal-e-azam. Oxford University Press. ISBN 978-0-19-568496-4.
- Asif, K. (1960). Mughal-e-azam. Shemaroo.
- Warsi, Shakil (2009). Mughal -E-Azam. Rupa & Co. ISBN 978-81-291-1321-4.
- Dissanayake, Wimal; Sahai, Malti (1992). Sholay, a cultural reading. Wiley Eastern. ISBN 978-81-224-0394-7.
- Chopra, Anupama (2000). Sholay: The Making of a Classic. Penguin Group India.
- Singh, Jai Arjun (2012). Jaane Bhee Do Yaaro: Seriously Funny since 1983. HarperCollins Publishers. ISBN 978-93-5029-022-4.
- Gopalan, Krishna (2014). The Making of Don. Blaft Publications. ISBN 978-81-291-2914-7.

== Music ==
- Mathai, Kamini (18 June 2009). A.R. Rahman: the musical storm. Penguin Group India. ISBN 978-0-670-08371-8.
- Ranade, Ashok Da. (1 January 2006). Hindi film song: music beyond boundaries. Bibliophile South Asia. ISBN 978-81-85002-64-4.
- Morcom, Anna (30 November 2007). Hindi film songs and the cinema. Ashgate Publishing, Ltd. ISBN 978-0-7546-5198-7.
- Varma, Kajal (2007). Love Songs from Bollywood Films. Star Publications. ISBN 978-1-905863-14-3.
- Sundar, Pavitra (2007). Sounding the nation: The musical imagination of Bollywood cinema. University of Michigan. ISBN 978-0-549-18081-4.
- Rajiv Vijayakar (2009). The History of Indian Film Music: A Showcase of the Very Best in Hindi Cinema. Bennett, Coleman & Company. ISBN 978-81-89906-81-8.
- Bharatan, Raju (2010). A Journey Down Melody Lane. Hay House Publishers - India. ISBN 978-81-89988-91-3.

== See also ==
- List of Hindi films
- Bibliography of India
