= Rekha: The Untold Story =

2016 Indian biographical book by Yasser Usman

- Author: Yasser Usman
- Language: English
- Subject: Rekha
- Genre: Biography
- Published: 29 August 2016
- Publisher: Juggernaut Books
- Publication place: India
- Media type: Print
- Pages: 231
- ISBN: 978-81-93284-18-6

Rekha: The Untold Story is a 2016 Indian biographical book by Yasser Usman, detailing the life of Indian film actress Rekha. The book chronicles her birth to South Indian actors Gemini Ganesan and Pushpavalli, which generated rumors in the media at the time, her well-publicised marriage to Delhi-based industrialist Mukesh Agarwal, who died by suicide in seventh months of marriage, and her fifty-year-long acting career.

After the success of his first book, Rajesh Khanna: The Untold Story of India's First Superstar (2014), Usman was motivated to write a biography about Rekha. He collected archives of pre-2000s magazines and her interviews at the National Film Archive of India. While writing the book, Usman faced difficulties since mostly Rekha's collaborator forgot or refused to talk about her; it took more than a year for him to finish it. Rekha: The Untold Story was released on 29 August 2016 by Juggernaut Books, and was critically praised.

== Summary ==
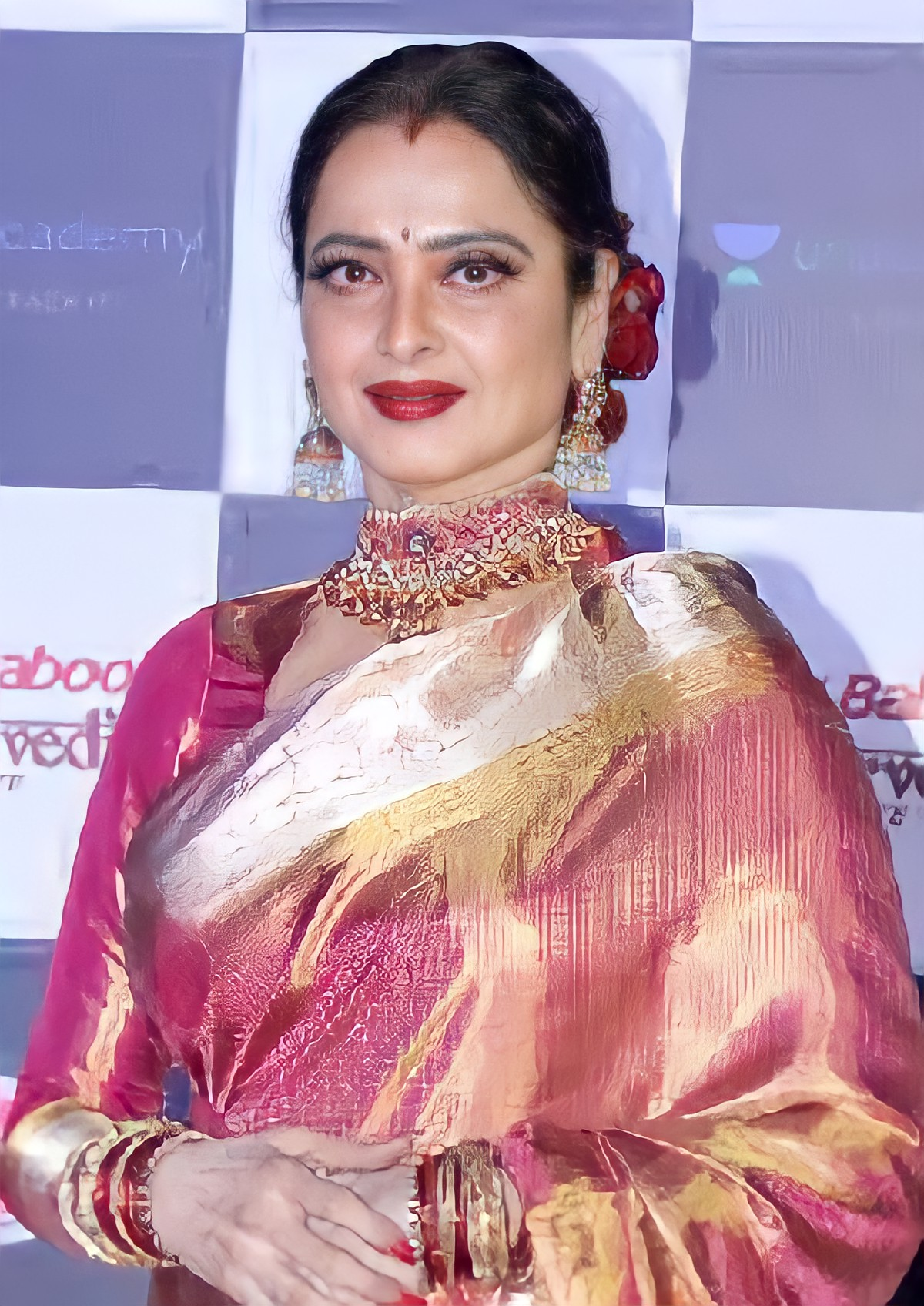
The book focuses on the life and career of Indian actress Rekha

Rekha: The Untold Story opens with Rekha's marriage to Delhi-based industrialist Mukesh Agarwal (1953–1990)^{:3–4} in March 1990, which lasted only seven months after her husband died by suicide, and the media's controversies that generated after this. It follows by her birth to unmarried couple Gemini Ganesan and Pushpavalli—both were South Indian actors—in 1954, which was followed by rumors in the media. The book chronicles her acting career, including her Tamil debut, the commercially successful social drama Rangula Ratnam (1966), in which she made a cameo appearance as a child artist, and Sawan Bhadon (1970). She was initially planned to made her Hindi debut with Anjana Safar (1979), which was delayed for ten years due to censorship problems. It then extensively examines several successful films of Rekha in Hindi cinema, including Khubsoorat (1980) and Umrao Jaan (1981), which won her the Filmfare Award and National Film Award for Best Actress, respectively.^{:12–114}

The book investigates controversies generated by Rekha's collaboration with Amitabh Bachchan and his wife Jaya Bachchan, for the 1981 romantic drama Silsila, after the media reported an affair rumor between Rekha and Amitabh. This follows by the information about her failed relationship with several actors, and her setback in the early 1990s, when her later films poorly received by both audiences and critics. It continues with her resurgence with Phool Bane Angaray (1991), Khiladiyon Ka Khiladi (1996) and Aastha: In the Prison of Spring (1997), all of which were success at the box office and received positive reviews from critics. Her acting career from the 2000s to 2010s and her term of office as the Rajya Sabha's member also chronicled. It tells several journalists' interviews of Rekha and a number of critics' and her contemporaries' opinion about her. The book ends with her meeting with Amitabh and Jaya Bachchan at the Screen Awards ceremony in 2016.^{:122–204}

== Background ==
In the foreword of Rekha: The Untold Story, Yasser Usman said, "I grew up [...] when her career was on the downslide. But I certainly love some of her performances from that decade and have always especially enjoyed her interviews." After publishing Rajesh Khanna: The Untold Story of India's First Superstar in 2014, Usman was continuously getting handwrite letters and e-mails from his fans. He revealed that "some still find their way into my inbox", and they expressed how they "were distressed, and surprised, to learn Rajesh Khanna's loneliness, little known about before."^{:ix} It motivated Usman for knowing other popular film stars' life, and he decided to write his second book on Rekha, whom he called an "eternal fighter".^{:ix} Rekha: The Untold Story marked the second book on the actress after Mohan Deep's Eurekha! (1999), which garnered negative reviews from critics.

== Development and writing ==
"It's a story close to my heart. When I began writing it, many people told me—What's there to write? We know her story! That is true to an extent. But I want to present her complete story—her struggles, her pain, her rise, her downfall and then the phenomenal fightback—so that her life is understood in a new perspective."

— Usman on Rekha: The Untold Story

Rekha: The Untold Story was the second book of Usman's "untold" trilogy. While working on Rajesh Khanna, he got to know several facts about Rekha but felt hesitant to discuss it. He needed around three years to decide to write the biography, saying, "Rekha is mostly talked with relation to her association with Amitabh Bachchan—as if she has only one aspect to her personality. This one-sided narrative had to be changed." The media often more focused on them when they attended same award ceremonies to increase the target rating point. Usman wanted a book on Rekha "that would make the reader think differently about Rekha". He compared Khanna's to her life and found them to be "similar", stating that "their on-screen personas are difficult to reconcile with their loneliness."

Usman took more than one year to write Rekha: The Untold Story. He collected several archives of magazines—such as Stardust, Star & Style and Super—and interviews on Rekha from the late 1960s, 1970s, 1980s and 1990s at the National Film Archive of India in Pune. According to Scroll.in, "This strategy gives [it] the same breathlessly gossipy quality of the smouldering actress' numerous interviews." Apart from that, Usman spoke of how "she used to give very lively interviews in those days, before she came to be known as a reclusive diva". He also approached around 40 to 50 people who worked with Rekha and close to her, including Gulzar, Muzaffar Ali, Shyam Benegal and several other journalists; he spoke of his confusion when most of them reacted, "Why Rekha?", and talked about her in sexist ways. In 2016, he revealed that they called Rekha an "unprintable name" and mocked her relationships and affairs,^{:x–xi} adding that most of her collaborators also forgot their experiences with her or they did not want to talk about her.

Usman, who also works as a television producer and journalist, has heard much news about alleged involvement by Rekha and her co-stars.^{:xi} After a series of failed telephone call for her, he finally sent a recording message to her, saying, "I genuinely want to write about you, about your own story", which she did not respond to. However, between three and four days later, her secretary Farzana called him and asked what he wrote. Farzana said that she would call him again, but did not. Usman stated that it was hard to write a biography on Indian celebrities from the 1970s and 1980s, noting that her interviews "have become philosophical and abstract".^{:xiii} When asked by The Indian Express about the book's writing process, he personally answered that Rekha's marriage to Agarwal was the most shocking part, which made him placed it in the first chapter of the book.

== Critical reception ==
Rekha: The Untold Story was positively received by critics. Sanjukta Sharma from Mint called it "a riveting book" that "taps into that irresistible fancy of knowing the different aspects of a star as mythologized as Rekha". The Asian Age's reviewer Nayare Ali praised Usman for "garnishes it with some juicy masala and re-serves it as a contemporary read", adding, "[It] is a book that anyone who is a fan or even fascinated by the star, would be tempted to read." Soumyadip Choudhury of News18 found the book "actually the Rekha story re-told but all the material at one place together helps the reader make more sense of the actress who went through numerous ups and downs and whose resplendent presence still make the cameras zoom in." Tanul Thakur of Open was impressed with the narrative and noted that the book's "different transitions ... feel smooth and credible" and added, "He has an eye for human drama, cleverly defining what's at stake in different phases of Rekha's life, so that we are constantly intrigued by and care about her story. But, most importantly, Usman does something more valuable: he shows empathy, something Rekha has been denied for long, both by journalists and those who were once close to her."

An Indo-Asian News Service critic observed that "Usman brings out the sad cost of movie stardom, especially for women, who are expected to be larger-than-life, engage in all kinds of exploits and controversies ... but judged harshly for all this when they seek a normal life and fail." Gargi Gupta of Daily News and Analysis described the book as "an image that speaks far more than Usman's words". Sowmya Rajendran from The News Minute called it "fast-paced and lucidly written with plenty of spice, making it a perfect airplane read". Writing for Film Companion, Mohini Chaudhari stated that the book was "a fascinating tale, and author Yasser Usman does well in documenting the tumultuous journey." Joginder Tuteja of Bollywood Hungama, who gave a rating of three and a half stars, found the book to be "entertaining" and appreciated it for "really well in sourcing a lot of quotes". In a review carried by Firstpost, Rohini Nair concluded: "Usman's writing of Rekha's story doesn't flag at any point. It is crisp, it is well-paced, it draws on numerous sources to make its point."

== Publication history ==
Region	Release date	Language	Format
India	29 August 2016	English	Hardcover
India	15 November 2016	Hindi	Amazon Kindle
India	31 March 2020	English	Paperback
India	29 May 2020	English	Amazon Kindle
