= Shivali Bhammer =

British singer

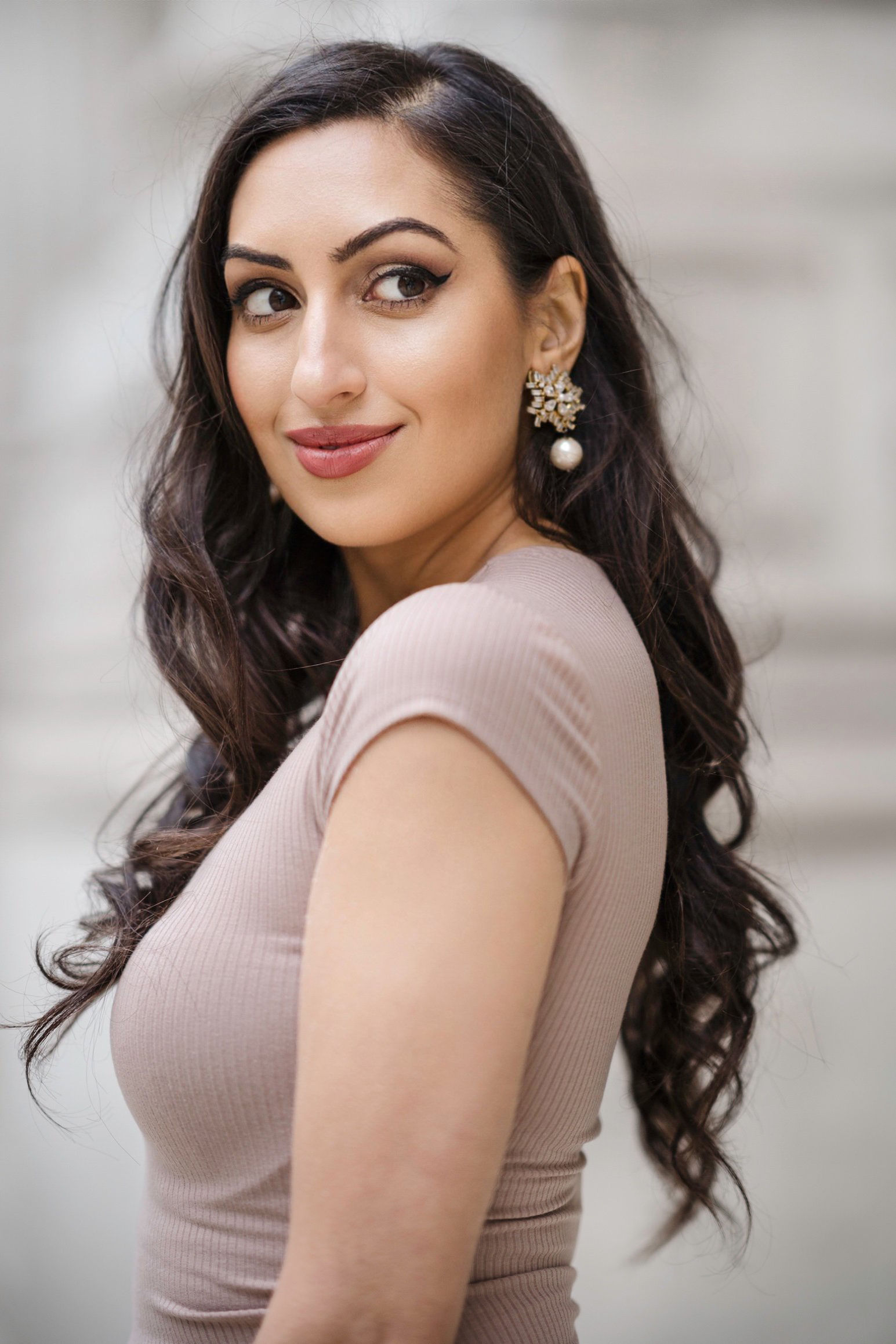

Background information
- Also known as: Shivali
- Born: Shivali Bhammer; 20 May 1987 (age 38); London, United Kingdom
- Genres: Fusion, Spiritual, RnB
- Occupations: Singer, Songwriter, Producer, Public Speaker, Dancer, Actor
- Years active: 2010 - present
- Labels: Sony Music, Eros Music
- Website: https://www.shivali.co.uk/

Shivali Bhammer (born 20 May 1987) known as Shivali, is a British singer-songwriter, playwright and public speaker who was born and raised in London.

As of 2023, Shivali is signed to Sony Music India and released her fourth album, The Bhajan Project 2, produced by, Arjun Coomaraswamy. During the 2020 Pandemic, Shivali released the singles "Shlokas" and "Jana Gana Mana" with Eros Now.

== Early and personal life ==
Shivali is of Indian Gujarati heritage and was born in St Mary's Hospital London. Her mother, Rashmi Thakar, immigrated to the United Kingdom from Kampala, Uganda. Shivali's father, Gopal Bhammer, was born in Gujarat, India.

== Career ==
Shivali was signed to Sony Music in India in 2010 and released The Bhajan Project. The Bhajan Project was nominated for two Global Indian Music Awards, Best Debut Single and Best Fusion Album. It also reached the top ten in the iTunes World Chart.

Shivali released her second album, Urban Temple with Eros Music in 2012. This album reached #1 on the iTunes World Chart.

Shivali is known for the creation of RnB Urban Contemporary Bhajans and was named one of the Top 25 under 25 UK Asian Artists by The Asian Voice Newspaper in the UK. Her albums were produced by singer Arjun.

In 2014, Shivali released State 108, an English album under Matchbox Recordings.

Shivali is also the playwright for Borders in a Bedroom which she performed at the Tamasha Festival in New York in 2016. Shivali won Outstanding Playwright and Outstanding Production of a Play. The play was brought to London as part of the Camden Fringe Festival in 2017 and named one of the top shows to watch by Time Out, and a top three play to watch by the Kentish Towner. It performed for five days at Tristan Bates Theatre in Covent Garden.

Shivali has written articles for the Financial Times in the FTFM section in 2008. She wrote for the Orange County Register's Business Section and Health & Spirituality in 2013. Shivali continues to be a freelance writer and has published for the India Link Magazine and Hinduism Today.

In 2017, Shivali was one of the main narrators for the Penguin Publishers release of the audiobook, You Bring the Distant Near, by Mitali Perkins.

From 2018 to 2020, Shivali was the voice of Sirus XM's Diplo's Revolution radio station. In 2019, Shivali was the host for Viacom's channel Aap Ka Colors covering the New York Indian Film Festival.

During the pandemic of 2020/2021 Shivali has written for the thinkright.me platform and Edviseme. She has also been featured on Episode 1 of 'Relight Your Fire' podcast. Shivali is also the creator of 'Conversations with Shivali' for the Eros Now platform owned by Eros International.

Shivali delivered workshops for the Spiritual Directors Conference 2018 in St Louis, and was the Keynote Speaker for the International Women's Day Conference in New York 2018. Shivali has delivered speeches for The Alchemist Kitchen, NYC, The Rotary Club Mumbai, The Brahma Kumaris, The Inner Enlightenment Spiritist Society in NYC and a regular contributor to the Evening Standard and BBC Radio Stations.

Shivali holds a diploma in Kathak from the Bhartiya Vidya Bhavan, she is the creator of The Dancers Playground and received the Best Solo Dance Award by the South Asian Performing Arts Festival in 2015.

Shivali released her fourth album The Bhajan Project 2 with Sony Music in India, 2023.

== Discography ==
=== Albums ===
Album name	Year
The Bhajan Project	2010
Urban Temple	2012
State 108	2014
The Bhajan Project 2	2023

=== Songs ===
Song name	Year
"Gayatri Mantra"	2010
"Jag Mein Sundar Hain Do Naam"	2010
"Achutum Kesavam"	2010
"Prabhu Ji"	2010
"Hey Ram Hey Ram"	2010
"Hey Govind Hey Gopal"	2010
"Hanuman Chalisa"	2010
"Shiva Shambho"	2010
"Ganesh Mantra"	2010
"Aum Namah"	2012
"Vaishnava Janato"	2012
"Hari Sundar"	2012
"Jai Jai Radha Ramana"	2012
"Mara Ghat Main"	2012
"Shivoham"	2012
"Chandra Bala"	2012
"Mujhe De"	2012
"Madhura Madhura"	2012
"Breathing in Love"	2014
"Real"	2014
"Old Mans Cave"	2014
"Fighting Shadows"	2014
"Rise Up High"	2014
"Can't See Me No More"	2014
"Don't Pull The Thread"	2014
"Wasn't It Beautiful"	2014
"The Artist"	2014
Mahamrityunjaya Mantra	2023
Radhe Radhe	2023
Hey Krishna Gopal Hari	2023
Shyam Teri Bansi	2023
Payoji Maine	2023
Om Jai Jagdish Hare	2023
Raghupati Raghav	2023
Shanti Paath	2023
