= Sanjay Dutt: The Crazy Untold Story of Bollywood's Bad Boy =

Biographical book

- Book cover
- Author: Yasser Usman
- Language: English
- Subject: Sanjay Dutt
- Genre: Biography
- Published: 13 March 2018
- Publisher: Juggernaut Books
- Publication place: India
- Media type: Print
- Pages: 256
- ISBN: 978-81-93284-18-6

Sanjay Dutt: The Crazy Untold Story of Bollywood's Bad Boy is a biography by Yasser Usman, detailing the life and career of the Indian film actor Sanjay Dutt. It chronicles his birth to actors Sunil Dutt and Nargis, his relationship with the actress Madhuri Dixit, covered extensively in the media at the time, being jailed because of his involvement in the Bombay riots, and his 47-year film career. The book was released on 13 March 2018 by Juggernaut Books and praised by critics.

Usman began writing the book in 2017 after meeting Dutt to talk about the latter's life and career. He spent eighteen months interviewing people who were close to him, including several of his school friends and teachers at The Lawrence School, Sanawar, police officers and co-inmates when he was jailed, as well as politicians, filmmakers, and co-stars. He also watched all of Dutt's films, and collected books, magazines, journals and interviews with him.

== Summary ==
The book opens with Sanjay Dutt winning an air guitar contest in 1982. Usman then examines Dutt's involvement in the Bombay riots, which occurred 11 years later and his imprisonment afterward. It follows with the story of his birth in 1959 to Indian actors Sunil and Nargis who used crowdsourcing conducted by the Urdu magazine Shama to choose his name. His career, including his first film Rocky (1981), which was a box office success but received poor critical reviews, and the thriller Naam (1986), the film that became the turning point of his career are examined. The book also details several commercially and critically successful films with his co-star Madhuri Dixit (with whom Dutt had a relationship that ended after he was jailed). These include Saajan (1991) and Khal Nayak (1993), both of which earned him nominations for the Filmfare Award for Best Actor. Usman also discusses Dutt's marriages to Richa Sharma between 1987 and 1996, Rhea Pillai in between 1998 and 2008 and Manyata Dutt in 2008.

== Development and writing ==
"Sanjay was the original bad boy of Bollywood ... [He] is, in a sense, the template, the pioneer; others have followed his footsteps. He was a model of masculinity in the 1980s and early 1990s, and perhaps the only stars in the Hindi film industry to have become synonymous with drugs, guns, leather jackets, ripping muscles, long hair, drinking, smoking, and partying."

— Usman on Sanjay Dutt, Sanjay Dutt: The Crazy Untold Story of Bollywood's Bad Boy, 2018^{:xi}

Continuing his "untold" trilogy, Yasser Usman's Sanjay Dutt: The Crazy Untold Story of Bollywood's Bad Boy is his third biography following Rajesh Khanna: The Untold Story of India's First Superstar and Rekha: The Untold Story (2016). He revealed he was motivated to write it because his father is a big fan of Dutt, adding, "... every time the Dutt[s] passed through a frightening tragedy, it was Sunil Dutt who we empathised with". Usman describes Dutt's life as "spectacular", and observes that his "attempt to document this story—the good, the bad and ... the disastrously absurd—is a journalistic one, complete with the conflicts, the mistakes, the many heart-breaking tragedies, and the overwhelming triumphs". According to The Indian Express, the main theme of the book was based on Ivan Turgenev's 1862 novel Fathers and Sons.

Usman began writing Sanjay Dutt: The Crazy Untold Story of Bollywood's Bad Boy in 2017. He met Dutt one evening to ask him about his life and career, "When you look back upon your life, what is it that would like to change?", according to the book's foreword. Dutt, however, immediately refused to answer his question. Usman interviewed many people close to Dutt, including his school friends and teachers at The Lawrence School, Sanawar, police officers and co-inmates when he was jailed, politicians, filmmakers and co-stars.^{:ix–x} Although most of them did not want to talk about him, several others agreed to be interviewed, including a restaurant waiter from Goa who had worked as Dutt's hairstylist in Khal Nayak (1993).^{:x–xi} Continuing his research, Usman watched all of Dutt's films, and collected books, magazines journals, and interviews with him.

Usman felt that Dutt's life has "a film-like quality",^{:xv} describing the book's story as being "about [his] father who refused to give up on his son, and a son who refused to grow up". He confessed that the audience's perception of Dutt after he was jailed in 1993 dismayed him and felt the prison sentence "over-defined him". Writing for The Asian Age, Usman said the research for the book was "extremely long" and "tedious, because there is no one-point reference source". Beside that, he added, "It is the story of a family of film stars that is sometimes difficult to comprehend with such moments of insanity that are often stranger than any fiction."

== Release and reception ==
The book was published on 13 March 2018 as a hardcover by Juggernaut Books. The release, however, became controversial after Dutt decried the book being published. He sent a legal notice to the publisher saying he had not authorized the biography adding, "from the excerpts that are appearing in the newspaper are partly based on my old interviews, but rest all seemed to be based on hearsay, 1990s' tabloids and gossip magazines, most of which are figments of imagination and not true". In response, Juggernaut Books stated that the book was "painstakingly footnoted, and the sources the book has relied upon have clearly been mentioned". They added, "To pay respect to Mr. Dutt's wishes, we won't put out any more extracts from the book in short-form media." A second hardcover printing was released on 31 March, and its paperback and Amazon Kindle editions followed on 20 September 2019 and 1 June 2020, respectively.

Critics wrote mostly positive reviews of Sanjay Dutt: The Crazy Untold Story of Bollywood's Bad Boy. The Times of India said that the book was "a meticulously researched testament to a Bollywood star's life and times and exhibits some unknown and shocking anecdotes". Aaqib Raza Khan, from the same publication, spoke of how Usman "has crafted a seemingly transparent profile" of Dutt, adding, "[...] the book reads seamlessly with no personal tilt apparent". Daily News and Analysis' reviewer Pooja Bhula noted that "Usman peppers the book with enough anecdotes, or perhaps scoops, to keep people reading". Joginder Tuteja of Bollywood Hungama, who gave it a rating of two-and-a-half stars, observed, "Nonetheless, the good part is that the book makes for a quick-fire read and hence you can wrap it up in a couple of hours." He described the book as "a very-easy read", saying, "The build-up is fine, the setup is good, the situations are reasonably well explained, the narrative is intact and certain moments hold your attention well too."

Rohini Nair, writing for the Firstpost website, felt the book "covers pretty comprehensively the transformation" of Dutt. In a review published by the Indo-Asian News Service, the critic Radhika Bhirani wrote that the biography is a "compelling narrative". Writing for Business Standard, Uttaran Das Gupta elaborated, "What emerges from this narrative, however, is not merely a morality tale about a spoilt star-kid gone wrong and his reformation, but also a history of the changing landscape of Bollywood as well as political and social life in India." Sanjukta Sharma of Mint noted that "it is impossible to write a biography of Bollywood figures impartially". She was appreciative of Usman for taking "the next best way out" and letting "the ugly speak for itself". Aprita Das of Film Companion and The Times of India subsequently included the book in their listings of "Top 7 Books on Cinema in 2018" and "12 Most Amazing Indian Non-fiction Reads of 2018", respectively.

== Publication history ==
Region	Release date	Format	Ref.
India	13 March 2018	Hardcover	
India	31 March 2018	Hardcover	
India	20 September 2019	Paperback	
India	1 June 2020	Amazon Kindle	
