= Yasser Usman =

Indian television journalist

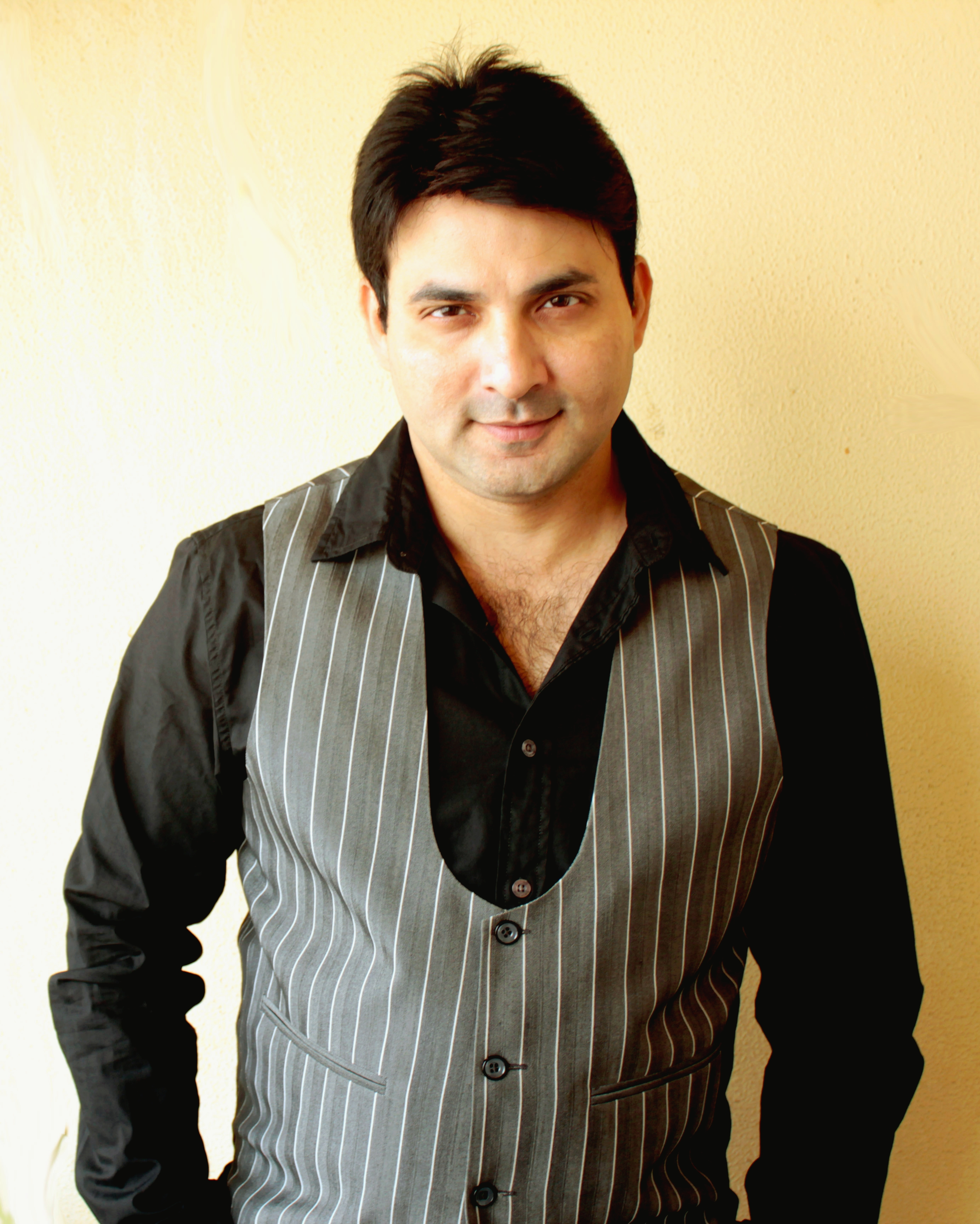
- Yasser Usman in 2017
- Born: 1980s India
- Education: University of Oxford; University of Delhi; Ramjas College; Indian Institute of Mass Communication
- Occupations: Writer, TV anchor, film journalist

Yasser Usman (born 1980s) is an Indian television journalist, author, news presenter, and biographer. He began his career by working as a television presenter and was awarded the Ramnath Goenka Excellence in Journalism Award for his contribution. Usman has been recognised by the media as one of India's most successful film biographers.

As a biographer, Usman's meticulously researched books primarily focus on the great cinematic journeys of stars, delving not only into their stardom but also their turbulent personal lives and tragic downfalls.

His latest biography is Guru Dutt An Unfinished Story. Before this book, Usman wrote the Untold trilogy, a series of three biographies on Hindi cinema- Bollywood. It started with Rajesh Khanna: The Untold Story of India's First Superstar (2014), which marked his debut as a biographer, and concluded with Sanjay Dutt: The Crazy Untold Story of Bollywood's Bad Boy (2018). Along with Rekha: The Untold Story (2016), Rajesh Khanna was nominated for the Crossword Book Award.

In January 2025, Usman's first work of fiction, a crime novel called As Dark As Blood was published by Simon & Schuster.

== Early life ==
Yasser Usman was born in the 1980s in Delhi. After finishing his schooling in several cities of Uttar Pradesh, he moved to Delhi to attend the University of Delhi and the Ramjas College, graduating with a Master of Science degree in environmental studies at the latter. He subsequently joined the Indian Institute of Mass Communication, training as a journalist for radio and television. He was part of a professional film screenwriting course at the University of Oxford.

== Career ==
=== Journalism ===
He started a career with the television company B.A.G. Films, and followed it by working for Channel 7; he produced a reality sports show titled Speedster, hosted the film review show Premier 7 and wrote-directed Raaz: Forensic Files Se, a television show on forensic science in India. After resigning from Channel 7, Usman worked on an investigative show, Benaqab, and served as the creative consultant for The Tony B Show, a talk show aired on Channel V in 2006. Usman joined Star News (later renamed ABP News) in 2007, in which he specialized in the non-fiction programming part; he directed several documentaries about sports and biographies of political figures and film personalities. In addition to working as a film critic and commentator, he hosted ABP News' digital show Cinema Uncut with Yasser Usman. In 2012, Usman won the Ramnath Goenka Excellence in Journalism Award for his contribution to film and television journalism. In 2016, the website Filmymonkey, on which he served as the founding editor, was launched.

In his stints with IBN7, Star News, ABP Network and CricketnMore, Yasser worked on implementing digital-first strategies. As the editorial in-charge and lead producer of 120+ large-scale television series, he won market-leading awards like the Ramnath Goenka Award for excellence in journalism, Red Ink Awards, News Television (NT) award (thrice), and the Indian Telly award.

In 2022, Usman joined CricketnMore.com, the award-winning multilingual sports website (Cricket, Football, Tennis, Badminton, Kabaddi, etc) as the Consulting Editor and Digital Content Strategist. Working towards product development, he launched many new digital shows and conceptualized content which contributed towards high viewership and digital success. He hosted a show Cricket Tales With Yasser Usman from London. The series covers interesting stories from the world of cricket.

In 2023, Usman started working as a Columnist writing on cinema for Khaleej Times, UAE's longest-running English daily newspaper, published in Dubai.

In 2024, Usman began writing about Indian cinema for the BBC and BBC Hindi. He also presented a special video series on Bollywood for BBC Hindi. He is also currently serving as a consultant across the entertainment, sports, and news genres.

Usman also contributes to NDTV India as a columnist and author, exploring the intersections of cinema and popular culture through his writings.

=== Author ===
In 2014, Usman made his debut as an author with Rajesh Khanna: The Untold Story of India's First Superstar, a Penguin Books biography about the actor and politician Rajesh Khanna. The writing started when he was in Mumbai to record a show for ABP News, at the same time he got to know about Khanna's death in 2012. Vijay Lokapally from The Hindu labelled it as an exception tribute to Khanna, but Gautam Chintamani of India Today observed that Usman did not detail much of his films. Following the publication, Usman said he received handwritten letters and emails from Khanna's fans, saying that they were surprised about Khanna's loneliness, motivating him to research other popular film stars' lives.^{:ix}

Usman's next book, Rekha: The Untold Story, is about the actress Rekha. The second biography of the actress after Mohan Deep's Eurekha! (1999), Usman's one-year research for this work included collecting archives of magazine issues about Rekha and interviewing her contemporaries, around 40 to 50 people.^{:x–xii} The Asian Age's Nayare Ali wrote it as "a book that anyone who is a fan or even fascinated by the star, would be tempted to read". Rohini Nair of Firstpost saw the book reveals nothing "untold" about the actress, and felt Usman relied entirely on the existing sources. Sowmya Rajendran from The News Minute wrote positively of the book's prose, calling it "fast-paced and lucidly written with plenty of spice, making it a perfect airplane read".

Usman's other two books: Sanjay Dutt: The Crazy Untold Story of Bollywood's Bad Boy and Guru Dutt: An Unfinished Story, also garnered a generally positive reception. Published in 2018, the former details the life of the actor Sanjay Dutt and is the last of his Untold trilogy, reflecting the use of the word "untold" in the title of Usman's first three books. It was controversial after Dutt decried that the book was published without his authorisation. Mint's Sanjukta Sharma praised Usman's deep research and his neutral point of view, and Film Companion listed it as one of the "top seven books on cinema of the year".

Guru Dutt: An Unfinished Story, released in 2021 by Simon & Schuster, describes the life of the filmmaker Guru Dutt. It was after watching Dutt's films at the 2004 Osian's Cinefan Festival of Asian and Arab Cinema when Usman was motivated to write about him. While researching for the book, Usman was met with the lack of free-domain archives of Dutt's interviews. Writing for The Hindu, Mini Anthikad Chhibber appreciated the book's remembrances by Dutt's sister, the artist Lalita Lajmi. In his review for Business Standard, the reviewer Chintan Girish Modi wrote, "Guru Dutt: An Unfinished Story is a moving account of a creative genius who was influenced by Hollywood melodrama, German expressionism, Bhakti poetry, and the Bauls of Bengal." Sathya Saran of The New Indian Express, however, gave a scathing review. The Hindustan Times featured the book in their "The Most Interesting Reads of the Week" listing, and The Telegraph included it in their year-end "Page Turners of 2021". Asian Voice (London) praised the book saying, "a mirror that reflects the hard-hitting realities of cinema ever since its inception. It is a narrative that shatters the myths, the rose-tinted glasses with which we as viewers look up to the film industry."

=== Fiction ===
Yasser Usman's first work of fiction As Dark As Blood, a thriller novel, was published in January 2025 by Simon & Schuster. Usman created a central character of a Delhi cop, Inspector Roshan Rana, a seasoned officer in Delhi Police who has a reputation for catching psychopathic murderers. The book is described as "Gripping, atmospheric, and emotionally charged, As Dark as Blood is much more than a sharp crime thriller. Layered with intrigue and psychological depth it leaves you breathless until the last page."

== Reception ==
Yasser Usman has been recognised by the media as one of India's most successful film biographers and gained a reputation for his writings that primarily focus on what is called the "dark side" of Bollywood. All of his books are unauthorised biographies; writing for The Telegraph in 2018, "However, 'unauthorised' doesn't mean 'irresponsible'. It only means I was going to have a harder time piecing together the narrative." This has once led him to controversy after his book on Sanjay Dutt was published when Dutt criticised Usman for not asking for his permission to write the book. Usman's books on Rajesh Khanna and Rekha were nominated for the Crossword Book Award in the biography category.

== Bibliography ==
- Usman, Yasser (5 December 2014). Rajesh Khanna: The Untold Story of India's First Superstar. Penguin Books. ISBN 978-9-351-18875-9.
- Usman, Yasser (29 August 2016). Rekha: The Untold Story. Juggernaut Books. ISBN 978-81-93284-18-6.
- Usman, Yasser (13 March 2018). Sanjay Dutt: The Crazy Untold Story of Bollywood's Bad Boy. Juggernaut Books. ISBN 978-81-93284-18-6.
- Usman, Yasser (7 January 2021). Guru Dutt: An Unfinished Story. Simon & Schuster. ISBN 978-93-86797-89-6.
