= The Mystery and Mystique of Madhubala =

1996 Biography by Mohan Deep

- Author: Mohan Deep
- Language: English
- Subject: Madhubala
- Genre: Biography
- Publisher: Magna Publications
- Publication date: 1996
- Publication place: India
- Media type: Print
- Pages: 166

The Mystery and Mystique of Madhubala is a 1996 biographical book written by Mohan Deep, and published by Magna Publications. It examines the life of Indian actress Madhubala (1933–1969) and her personal relationships. Described by Deep as "the first unauthorised biography in Indian film history", the book attracted controversy for its portrayal of Madhubala's personal life and for claims that were disputed by her family and several associates.

== Overview ==
The Mystery and Mystique of Madhubala primarily focuses on Madhubala's private life, including her relationship with her father, the film producer Ataullah Khan, as well as her alleged affairs with several men: the childhood sweetheart Latif; directors Kidar Sharma, Mohan Sinha and Kamal Amrohi; co-stars Prem Nath, Dilip Kumar, Pradeep Kumar, and Bharat Bhushan; the Prime Minister of Pakistan, Zulfikar Ali Bhutto; and her eventual husband, actor-singer Kishore Kumar.

The book contains disputed claims such as Madhubala as having offered ₹9 lakh to Amrohi to divorce his wife and marry her, and later "two timing" with Prem Nath and Dilip Kumar in 1951. It also alleges (as quoted by scholar Dina Khdair) that Madhubala became "a 'sex slave' for powerful industry leaders and was regularly shackled, whipped, and confined by her husband".

== Development and writing ==
Deep referred to the book as "the first unauthorised biography in Indian film history".

According to Deep:

I wanted my biographies to bring out the real, colourful personalities I was writing about. I wanted people to know that Madhubala had a hole in her heart and she was vomiting blood before giving a shot and that her father pushed her to do more and more. I wanted her fans to know how Dilip Kumar exploited, harassed and abused the beautiful actress.

He stated that he interacted with almost 200 people in the process of writing the book; including Madhubala's associates Shammi Kapoor, Ashok Kumar, Johnny Walker, Tajdar Amrohi (son of Kamal Amrohi), and Shakti Samanta. However, Deep admitted that he did not pursue an interview with Dilip Kumar because he believed the actor would decline to participate.

It took Deep eight months to collect information on Madhubala and two months to write the book.

== Reception ==
The book was published by Magna Publications in 1996. Khushwant Singh wrote that Deep is a "gifted gossip writer" and brought Madhubala "alive" with his writing.

In a review of later biographies of Madhubala, the magazine Verve compared Deep's book unfavourably to Khatija Akbar's Madhubala: Her Life, Her Films (1997). It further stated that "Mohan Deep's Madhubala is offensively gossipy and reads like an extended magazine article from the run-of-the-mill catty publications."

Manjunath Pendukar cited the book as an example of such celebrity biographies which fail to "locate the celebrity's work in the larger map of the development of the industry".

In Crossover Stars in the Hindi Film Industry (2020; Taylor & Francis), Dina Khdair argued that Deep's biography "takes speculation about [Madhubala's] private life to extremes" and cited it as an example of the sensationalized discourse that portrays Madhubala as a "victim and dangerously sexualized woman whose end was warranted by moral delinquency".

== Controversy ==
The book was criticised by Madhubala's sister, Madhur Brij Bhushan, who accused Deep of misrepresenting Madhubala's life, and denied several of his claims:

Kidar Sharma and Mohan Sinha were old enough to be her father; Kamal Amrohi was a married man and given our economic conditions how could she, the sole earning member of our family, offer him Rs 9 lakh? Premnath was infatuated with her but inter-religion marriages were taboo in those days; Pradeep Kumar was never involved with her ... Tell me, if Premnath and Dilip Kumar were angry over her two-timing, why were they present at her funeral?

The book was later criticised by many of Madhubala's associates, including co-stars Shammi Kapoor and P. Jairaj, director Shakti Samanta, and the journalists M. S. M. Desai, Iqbal Masud, and B. K. Karanjia.

Jairaj defended Madhubala as "a very clean girl" and someone "who could be sociable and reserved at the same time". Kapoor said, "Mohan Deep is a swine. You can't cash in on the dead—it is in bad taste. It is a pity that while in America you could be sued for misrepresentation, in India sleaze only gives a shot to sales ... Madhubala, a wonderful person and a dedicated artiste, doesn't deserve this."

During a 1996 live chat with readers of Rediff.com, Deep defended the book and argued that Madhubala's family was unfairly criticizing his work, adding, "I think I'm glamourising her... something she deserves. I genuinely believe that all great artistes have a right to live their lives the way they want. They give so much of themselves to us, can't we give them this little?"
