= Eurekha! =

1999 biography of Rekha by Mohan Deep

- Author: Mohan Deep
- Language: English
- Subject: Rekha
- Genre: Biography
- Published: 17 December 1999
- Publisher: Shivani Publications
- Publication place: India
- Media type: Print
- Pages: 284
- ISBN: 978-81-90107-90-7

Eurekha! is a biography of the actress Rekha by the columnist and author Mohan Deep. The book details her Hindi film acting career and her short-term marriage with the industrialist Mukesh Aggarwal. It was published on 17 December 1999 by Shivani Publications and later reprinted in a number of Indian languages, including a serialisation in the magazine Anandalok. It received negative reviews from critics, who panned Deep's writing and the book's contents. Rekha herself was critical of the book due to its misinformation.

== Synopsis ==
Eurekha! is out of print. It examines Rekha's acting career in Hindi cinema beginning at age 13 and her marriage to the industrialist Mukesh Aggarwal. A thirteenth chapter of the book, titled "Temptations and Seductions", is provided on Deep's website. It investigates her alleged, romantic relationship with the actor Amitabh Bachchan, positing that the affair began during the shooting of Do Anjaane (1976).

== Development and release ==
Eurekha! was originally titled Re, the way Rekha is addressed by her friends and fans. Deep's friend, the journalist Chaitanya Padukane, recommended him to change the title to Eurekha! (a combination the subject's name and the word eureka). (Note: Eureka (transl. I have got it) is an interjection to celebrate a discovery or invention, which is the transliteration of an exclamation attributed to the Ancient Greek mathematician Archimedes.) Deep said, "Like Archimedes who screamed 'eureka!' when he discovered his principle ... I was supposed to have 'discovered' the real Rekha. So Eurekha!" It was his first book chronicling a living person, attributing this to the criticism he got after publishing his previous books (about Madhubala and Meena Kumari) that critics panned for "raking up the past" of deceased people.

Published on 17 December 1999 by Shivani Publications in English, the book was reprinted in Hindi, Marathi, and Gujarati under the title Rekha O Rekha!; it was also serialised in the Bengali-language magazine Anandalok. The book generated controversy as soon as Rekha admitting she was angry at Deep for chronicling her life without her permission and claimed that most information in the book were misleading. In an interview with Deccan Herald, she expressed her astonishment of how he collected "all those hearsay account" and criticised the title. Rekha believed that "the kind of language used by the man only reflects his personality". Deep was prepared for a lawsuit from Rekha in response to the book, but she did not file one. She informed Filmfare in March 2000:

"So many myths have circulated about me. God bless all those who want to make fast buck out my life... or at my expense. Whatever I've done in life, has been tucked away in my memory files for posterity. I have a photographic memory about everything—be it my profession, my achievements, my relationships. And if truth be told, no one is really interested in the real me except my family and close friends. At best, only the prurient or personal aspects grab attention in public. Whether I decide to get married, have a baby, or even plant a tree in my garden, that's purely my personal business. And I pray that it stays that way."

== Critical reception ==
Upon release, Eurekha! had reviews that were generally scathing due to Deep's writing and the book's contents. Tara Patel of The Afternoon Despatch & Courier described it as "an arrogant, crude example of how a woman, who happens to be a film star, can be victimised and exploited even while she lives." Mid-Day expressed similar thoughts, writing that Deep failed to chronicle his subject's life and career in a proper writing style. India Today referred to Eurekha! as a "shoddily-[written] biography". In contrast, The Telegraph's Ashok Banker wrote that Deep "has the guts to grab the tigress by the tail", believing his narration of Rekha's marriage to Agarwal is readable and entertaining. V. Gangadhar from The Tribune felt the book is full of details of her personal life, while Movie Mag International praised its authenticity.

The Asian Age observed that Deep "has her life in a no-holds-barred-manner", and the Hindustan Times opined his prose is "purple". Another writer from The Afternoon Despatch & Courier was more positive, thinking that Deep had not got any credits he deserved for his works and praising his effort of researching her life. The Mumbai-based magazine Savvy said the book is "unputdownable", complimenting the fluidity in his narration which the reviewer thought would "[spur] your own vicarious curiosity for a fascinating film legend". The Free Press Journal commented, "... the enigma lies exposed as her life reflects the complexed, confused meanderings of a sharp and gifted individual." Behram Contractor labelled it the book version of the Sunset Boulevard of "the biggest and definitely the most intriguing actress in Bollywood's history".
