= Guru Dutt: An Unfinished Story =

2021 Indian biographical book written by Yasser Usman

- Author: Yasser Usman
- Language: English
- Subject: Guru Dutt
- Genre: Biography
- Published: 7 January 2021
- Publisher: Simon & Schuster
- Publication place: India
- Media type: Print
- Pages: 336
- ISBN: 978-93-86797-89-6

Guru Dutt: An Unfinished Story is a 2021 Indian biographical book written by Yasser Usman, chronicling the life and career of the Indian actor and filmmaker Guru Dutt. It describes Dutt's birth in Panambur in 1925, his 18-year-long film career, his marriage to the playback singer Geeta Dutt, with whom he had three children, and his death in 1964.

The book was written by Usman in the period of two years. He collected archives of Dutt's accounts and information from Dutt's family members, close friends, and colleagues, compiling them in a book that was later published on 7 January 2021 by Simon & Schuster.

Guru Dutt’s younger sister, Lalitha Lajmi, collaborated with author Yasser Usman, sharing her intimate memories of the legendary filmmaker. As a firsthand witness to Guru Dutt’s life, her heartfelt contribution added a unique and deeply personal touch that made this biography truly exceptional.

It received positive feedback from critics, with most attention directed towards Usman's writing.

== Synopsis ==
The book opens with the success of Sahib Bibi Aur Ghulam (1962) and its screening at the 13th Berlin International Film Festival. The film, produced by and stars Guru Dutt, won the Filmfare Award for Best Film and became the official submission from India for the 35th Academy Awards. Following a series of information about his depression, it investigates his suicidal death on the morning of 10 October 1964. In the next chapter, the book chronicles Dutt's birth in Panambur on 9 July 1925 to Vasanthi and Shivshankar Rao Padukone. His parents were Konkani-speaking and married in 1920, when Padukone was 20 and Vasanthi was 12. Dutt made his acting debut with Baazi in 1951, and details his commercially successful films, including Aar Paar (1954), Mr. & Mrs. '55 (1955), and C.I.D (1956). The book also discusses his marriage in 1953 to the playback singer Geeta Dutt, with whom he had three children.

== Development and writing ==
In 2004, the journalist-turned-biographer Yasser Usman attended the Osian's Cinefan Festival of Asian and Arab Cinema in Delhi and watched Dutt's films for the first time. He confessed he was impressed by the actor's films and described them as "magical". In an interview to Asian Voice, Usman found Dutt's works mostly reflect his life experiences, adding that he "realized [...] how personal his cinema was". At the festival, however, Usman saw that people were talking about how disturbed Dutt was during his life without discussing the reason. He quote this as his motivation to write the book.

"His films, his characters, his emotions were truly rooted in Indian culture and society. He borrowed some finer aspects of Hollywood and European cinema but moulded them in an Indian scenario. Also, he did everything in the mainstream format. He was very particular about the fact that his art should reach the masses. He really cared about commercial success. His films are technically brilliant and do not seem dated even now."

— Usman on Dutt in 2021

The writing took two years, with Usman only collecting few archives of Dutt's interviews as none of them were in the public domain. He also used several of Dutt's accounts in Bengali and Kannada for his research. He tracked down Dutt's family members, close friends, and colleagues, but a few died before he met them. Usman had several conversations with Dutt's younger sister, the painter Lalita Lajmi, and was impressed by her detail narration on Dutt's personal life, such as mentioning the dates, people, places and timelines: "I am deeply indebted to her for this crucial documentation. Really thankful that she allowed me an entry into her inner world." She told Usman about Dutt's mental issues which led him to commit suicide and blamed herself for it. She also discussed her sibling relationship with Dutt, mostly that from the 1950s and 1960s, and his on-screen and off-screen life.

"The maker of classic Hindi films such as Pyaasa and Kaagaz Ke Phool - film school staples for their timeless themes - Dutt forged a deeply personal, introspective style of filmmaking that was novel in the post-independence era. His complex characters often reflected his personal struggles; his plots touched upon universal motifs, inviting the audience to confront uncomfortable realities through hauntingly beautiful cinema." — Yasser Usman on Guru Dutt, BBC 2025.

== Critical reception ==
Critics were generally appreciative of the work. Writing for The Quint, Nirupama Kotru described it as "honest, clear and based on solid research, unlike most social media posts which would have left Guru Dutt bewildered". Prathyush Parasuraman from Film Companion website wrote, "[Its chapters are] very contained, brief, but in its briefness it betrays the spirit of a good biographer—to make the reader feel." In The Hindu, Mini Anthikad Chhibber opined that the book "is a perfect introduction to one of our most important film makers" for its short chapters and easy-to-read prose. She was also impressed by Usman's ability to "[pepper] the book with many touching remembrances" from Lajmi. Asian Voice called the book "a mirror that reflects the hard hitting realities of cinema ever since its inception", praising its narrative which, according to the review, "shatters the myths, the rose tinted glasses with which we as viewers look up to the film industry". Saqlain Soomro of the Daily Times took note of his "meticulous" research, while the Deccan Chronicle's Partha Chatterjee stated that it is better than Nasreen Munni Kabir's Guru Dutt: A Life in Cinema (1996), whose contents mostly talk about Dutt's films only.

An Indo-Asian News Service critic lauded Usman for providing "a richly-layered account that takes a deep dive into the journey of a lonesome, troubled genius who was endlessly being pulled in contrary directions throughout his life." News18 hailed, "With Guru Dutt: An Unfinished Story, author Yasser Usman reconstructs a mesmerizingly tragic story of Guru Dutt and his equally accomplished wife and singer Geeta Dutt." The Marathi newspaper Loksatta commended Usman for "[trying] find the threads of the study-research by searching for the undiscovered things", and Business Standard's Chintan Girish Modi added that Usman had brought "a fine understanding of the overlaps between Dutt's personal and professional life" without "resorting [...] gossip" and "[bringing] perspectives from various people who were contemporaries" of the actor. Reviewing for The Telegraph, Devdan Mitra praised the work as "an honest effort to portray the man behind the auteur even if some stories will always remain unfinished." Sathya Saran of The New Indian Express, however, was critical of the book:

"... there is despair over the fact that an author who is capable of much better work should glean so heavily from available material to stitch it together so clumsily. The fact that he gives credit in some places, but lifts entire passages almost verbatim in others without acknowledgement, opens this book up for a case of blatant plagiarism. Surprising a publisher of standing like [Simon & Schuster] took the risk."

The Hindustan Times featured Guru Dutt: An Unfinished Story in their listing of "The Most Interesting Reads of the Week". The Telegraph included in their year-end listing of the "Page Turners of 2021".

== Publication history ==
| Region | Release date | Format | Ref. |
|---|---|---|---|
| India | 7 January 2021 | Amazon Kindle | |
| India | 7 January 2021 | Hardcover | |
