= The Afternoon Despatch & Courier =

Newspaper in Mumbai, India

- Type: Daily newspaper
- Format: Tabloid
- Founder: Behram Contractor alias "Busybee"
- Associate editor: Anant Rao Kanangi
- Founded: 25 March 1985
- Ceased publication: July 2019
- Political alignment: Centre-Left
- Language: English
- City: Mumbai
- Country: India
- Website: www.afternoondc.in
- Free online archives: www.afternoondc.in/epaper/default.aspx

The Afternoon Despatch & Courier was an evening tabloid in Mumbai, India. The newspaper was launched by Behram Contractor, better known as "Busybee", on 25 March 1985.

This newspaper served as a launch pad for several well-known journalists in India. The Afternoon Despatch & Courier concentrates on news and features from Mumbai and the adjoining cities.

Kamal Morarka - former union minister and businessman and national president of the Samajwadi Janata Party Chandrashekhar, was the chairman of the board of directors of this newspaper held by company - Courier Publications Pvt. Ltd.

The editorial quality of this newspaper was unparalleled, with a strong emphasis on language that set it apart. As a result, 'Afternoon' garnered a vast and diverse readership, built on a foundation of high credibility. The newspaper featured specialized sections on different days: 'Style' on Mondays, 'Business Extra' on Tuesdays, 'Bombay First' on Wednesdays, 'Woman's Extra' on Thursdays, 'In Touch' for the youth and Bollywood on Fridays, and 'Health' on Saturdays.

The roster of regular contributors was a veritable 'Who's Who' of the journalistic world, featuring names like Dom Moraes, Manohar Malgaonkar, M. J. Akbar, Vir Sanghvi, Tavleen Singh, Arun Shourie, Maneka Gandhi, Khushwant Singh, Kuldip Nayar, Inder Malhotra, J. B. D'Souza, M. V. Kamath, Arati Jerath, and many others. The front page also showcased a pocket cartoon by the renowned cartoonist and artist, the late Mario Miranda.

Anant Rao Kanangi served as associate editor until the newspaper ceased publication. Notable editors like Mark Manuel, Ramesh Prabhu, and Sharad Kotnis had long and impactful tenures with the publication. Farzana Contractor once held the position of CEO, while Carol Andrade was the last full-time editor. Shashikant Jadhav was the printer-publisher.

The reporting team consisted of highly trained and experienced journalists, led by the then chief reporter Indira Rodericks. The team of photographers was efficiently managed by Chief Photographer Anthony Azavedo and Vishwanath Salian. Philip Varghese served as the final chief reporter when the publication ceased printing in 2019.

The newspaper started publishing from its initial office at Sewri, then 'Afternoon House' at Flora Fountain and ceased publication since July, 2019 from its last office at Janmabhoomi Bhavan, Fort.
