= Filmfare =

Indian film magazine

- Cover of the April 2021 issue
- Editor: Jitesh Pillai
- Former editors: B. K. Karanjia; Rauf Ahmed; Bikram Singh; Pritish Nandy; Khalid Mohamed; Shashi Baliga
- Categories: Entertainment
- Frequency: Fortnightly
- Circulation: 342,000
- Publisher: Joji Varghese
- Founder: J. C. Jain
- Founded: 1952
- Company: Worldwide Media
- Country: India
- Based in: Mumbai
- Language: English
- Website: filmfare.com
- ISSN: 0971-7277
- OCLC: 1774328

Filmfare is an Indian English-language fortnightly magazine published by Worldwide Media. Acknowledged as one of India's most popular entertainment magazines, it publishes pieces involving news, interviews, photos, videos, reviews, events, and style. The magazine also annually gives the Filmfare Awards, the Filmfare Awards South, the Filmfare Awards East, the Filmfare Marathi Awards, the Filmfare Awards Punjabi, the Filmfare Awards Bangla, the Filmfare OTT Awards, the Filmfare Short Film Awards and the Filmfare Style & Glamour Awards.

After the businessman Ramkrishna Dalmia (1893–1978) of Dalmia Group purchased Bennett, Coleman and Company Limited (BCCL) in 1946, J. C. Jain from Bharat Insurance Company was employed to help him in running the company in 1950. In this period, Jain conceived the idea of Filmfare at the actress Kamini Kaushal's house. The magazine was launched by the industrialist Sahu Shanti Prasad Jain alongside his wife Rama in Bombay on 7 March 1952. Its circulation started to decline in the early 1990s and to handle these problems, Filmfare started special monthly editions for Telugu, Tamil, and Malayalam cinema. In 2004, BCCL (who previously published the magazine) established a subsidiary, Worldwide Media, for publishing its future issues.

== History ==
=== Establishment (1946–1952) ===
Ramkrishna Dalmia (1893–1978) was born in Chirawa into a Marwari family. He had a brother, Jaidayal Dalmia, with whom he established Dalmia Group in the 1930s. In 1946, on the threshold of the independence of India from the United Kingdom, Ramkrishna Dalmia purchased Bennett, Coleman and Company Limited (BCCL) for ₹2 crore (equivalent to ₹286 crore or US$30 million in 2023). According to Sangita P. Menon Malhan's The TOI Story (2013), the purchase was by him solely because he wanted to establish newspapers that could help him to "serve India effectively". While Dalmia was searching for a person to help him to run it, J. C. Jain, a former employee of Bharat Insurance Company, saw the opportunity and took it in March 1950; he became the company's general manager until 1963.

During his term-of-office, Jain started the publication of Filmfare as a fortnightly magazine on 7 March 1952 to "build awareness about filmmaking and films". It was launched by Sahu Shanti Prasad Jain and his wife Rama in Bombay, distributed by The Times of India newspaper, and promoted with the taglines, "Another name for 'Credibility'" and "The first serious effort in film journalism in India". It contains short biography of rising actors at the time, film reviews, and a number of columns, including "The Fortnight in Films" and "Filmfacts". Published two months after the 1st International Film Festival of India, Neepa Majumdar (in her 2012 book Global Neorealism: The Transnational History of a Film Style) wrote that the magazine "saw the festival as an opportunity for Indian film [actors] to be exposed to quality films" and established themselves as leading actors. In the first issue, a manifesto was declared:

It is from this dual standpoint of its industry and its patrons, whom comprise the vast audience of movie fans, that Filmfare is primarily designed. This magazine represents the first serious effort in film journalism in India. It is a movie magazine—with a difference. The difference lies in our realisation that the film as a composite art medium calls for serious study and constructive criticism and appreciation from the industry as also from the public.

=== The Filmfare Awards (1953–2001) ===
In the following year, Filmfare instituted the Filmfare Awards (previously Clare Awards, named after Clare Mendonça). Modelled after the Academy Awards, the winners were voted by a total of 20,000 of the magazine's readers. The first iteration's ceremony took place at Metro Cinema in Bombay on 21 March 1954, and only five categories without nominations were presented: Best Film, Best Director, Best Actor, Best Actress, and Best Music Director. The award has been considered one of the oldest and most prominent film awards in India; Business Line called it "one such coveted award".

In 1957, Filmfare published the "Self-portraits" series, where several well-known actors at the time, including Ashok Kumar, Dev Anand, Dilip Kumar, Meena Kumari, Nargis, Nutan and Raj Kapoor, were invited and accepted to talk about themselves and their experiences. The magazine faced controversy after the actress Sharmila Tagore did a shot with her photographer Dhiren Chawda with only wearing a two-piece floral bikini for its 19 August 1966 issue. The first time for an Indian celebrity to pose with only a bikini for a magazine cover, she revealed that it was her personal choice but later admitted she had "no idea" why she wanted to. In association with United Producers (a group formed by G. P. Sippy, Shakti Samanta and B. R. Chopra), Filmfare organised the United Producers-Filmfare Talent Contest (also known as the All India Talent Contest) (Note: While the biographer Yasser Usman called it the United Producers-Filmfare Talent Contest, Joy Bhattacharjya of Business Line reported that it was named the All India Talent Contest.) in 1965.

In the 1970s, Rauf Ahmed worked as the editor of the magazine, replacing B. K. Karanjia who had filled the position for 18 years. (Note: The Hindu did not mention the year when B. K. Karanjia joined Filmfare.) Talking to Daily News and Analysis in 2015, Ahmed spoke of how the magazine nearly collapsed at the time as no gossip columns were written by its journalist. Following his quit, Bikram Singh (the actor K. N. Singh's brother) was hired for the position until the early of the next decade. Pritish Nandy replaced him in 1984; the first issue he edited was published in July that year, titled "Unquestionably No. 1", which features the actress Sridevi on the cover. The circulation of Filmfare dropped in the early 1990s, prompting the publisher to attach free consumer products (such as soaps or shampoo sachets) to the magazine. Additionally, special monthly editions with a few pages dedicated to Malayalam, Tamil and Telugu cinema were begun and, as reported by The Quint in 2019, become commercial successes. Khalid Mohamed was appointed as the editor in 1993.

=== Ownership change (2002–present) ===
In 2002, following Mohamed's nine-year tenure, Shashi Baliga replaced him as Filmfare's editor; in an article published in Business Line, she described the occupation as "an opportunity that came unsought". BCCL announced their joint venture with the BBC Worldwide, a company named Worldwide Media, on 1 December 2004; the new company later published the future issues of the magazine. In 2006, Jitesh Pillai was appointed as the new editor. Filmfare launched the Filmfare Awards East in 2014, the Filmfare Style & Glamour Awards and Filmfare Marathi Awards in 2015, the Filmfare Short Film Awards in 2016, the Filmfare Awards Punjabi in 2017, and the Filmfare OTT Awards in 2020. As of March 2021, the magazine was published by Joji Varghese under The Times Group's subsidiary Worldwide Media and Pillai served as the editor.

== Reception ==
Filmfare covers news, interviews, photos, videos, reviews, events, and style. It is considered one of the most popular and reputable magazines in India; The Illustrated Weekly of India referred to the magazine as "decorous", and British magazine The Spectator praised it for "[providing] a good example of how the mainstream media marginalizes certain films as 'sleaze'". According to a 2004 article by The Economic Times, the magazine's monthly print circulation was 147,000. In 2008, the cinema and cultural analysis professor Rachel Dwyer estimated that it was 200,000. In a survey conducted by the Indian Readership Survey, the circulation of the magazine was 276,000 in 2013 and 342,000 in 2014.

== See also ==
- List of magazines in India

== Bibliography ==
- Akbar, Khatija (2011) [1997]. 'I Want to Live': The Story of Madhubala. New Delhi, India: Hay House India. ISBN 978-93-80480-81-7.
- Dwyer, Rachel (1 August 2008). "The Indian Film Magazine, Stardust". In Kavoori, Anandam P.; Punathambekar, Aswin (eds.). Global Bollywood. New York University Press. ISBN 978-0-8147-2944-1.
- Majumdar, Neepa (2012). "Importing Neorealism, Exporting Cinema: Indian Cinema and Film Festivals in the 1950s". In Sklar, Robert; Giovacchini, Saverio (eds.). Global Neorealism: The Transnational History of a Film Style. University Press of Mississippi. ISBN 978-1-61703-123-6.
- Malhan, Sangita P. Menon (25 July 2013). The TOI Story. HarperCollins. ISBN 978-93-5029-663-9.
- Panda, Tapan Kumar (2004). Building Brands in the Indian Market. Excel Books India. ISBN 978-81-7446-391-3.
- Usman, Yasser (5 December 2014). Rajesh Khanna: The Untold Story of India's First Superstar. Gurgaon, India: Penguin Books. ISBN 978-9-351-18875-9.
