= Sanjay Dutt filmography =

Indian filmography

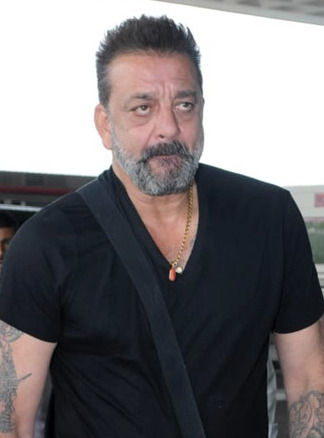
Sanjay Dutt at Mumbai Airport

Sanjay Dutt is an Indian actor known for his work in Hindi films as well as a few Telugu, Kannada, Tamil, Marathi and Punjabi films. He made his acting debut in 1981, opposite Tina Ambani, in his father Sunil Dutt's romantic action film Rocky (1981). Rocky was ranked at tenth highest-grossing Bollywood films of 1981. In 1991, Dutt appeared in Lawrence D'Souza's Indian romantic drama film Saajan (1991), starring alongside Madhuri Dixit and Salman Khan. For his performance, Dutt was nominated for the Filmfare Award for Best Actor. He was nominated again for the same award for his performance in Khalnayak (1993). Dutt won the Filmfare Award for Best Actor—for portraying a young man who later becomes a gangster in Vaastav: The Reality (1999). He also received critical acclaim for his performance. Dutt next appeared in Vidhu Vinod Chopra's crime thriller film Mission Kashmir (2000).

In 2003, Dutt appeared in Rajkumar Hirani's directorial debut: comedy-drama film Munna Bhai M.B.B.S. (2003). He played Munna Bhai, who attends medical school to obtain an MBBS degree. The film was successful at the box office, grossing ₹230 million (equivalent to ₹920 million or US$9.6 million in 2026) in India and ₹360 million (equivalent to ₹1.4 billion or US$15 million in 2026) worldwide. Dutt won Filmfare Award for Best Performance in a Comic Role.

In 2006, Dutt starred alongside Arshad Warsi, Vidya Balan, and Boman Irani in Rajkumar Hirani's comedy-drama film Lage Raho Munna Bhai (2006), the sequel to in the sequel to Munna Bhai M.B.B.S.. The film received critical acclaim, and Dutt went on to win several awards, including Screen Award for Best Actor (Critics), and Zee Cine Critics Award for Best Actor – Male. Apart from acting, Dutt has hosted season 5 of Bigg Boss (2011–2012) alongside Salman Khan.

== Film ==
Key
†	Denotes films that have not yet been released

List of Sanjay Dutt film credits
Year	Title	Role(s)	Notes	Ref.
1971	Reshma Aur Shera	Qawwali singer	Child artist	
1981	Rocky	Rakesh / Rocky D'Souza "Rocky"		
1982	Johny I Love You	Raju Singh / Johny		
1982	Vidhaata	Kunal Singh		
1983	Main Awara Hoon	Sanjeev "Sanju" Kumar		
1983	Bekaraar	Shyam		
1984	Zameen Aasmaan	Sanjay		
1984	Mera Faisla	Raj Saxena		
1985	Do Dilon Ki Dastaan	Vijay Kumar Saxena		
1985	Jaan Ki Baazi	Inspector Amar / Laxman	Dual role	
1986	Naam	Vicky Kapoor		
1986	Mera Haque	Amar Singh / Amru Dada	Dual role	
1986	Jeeva	Jeevan Thakur / Daku Jeeva		
1987	Imaandaar	Rajesh "Raju"		
1987	Naam O Nishan	Inspector Suraj Singh		
1987	Inaam Dus Hazaar	Kamal Malhotra / Ashok Saxena		
1987	Jeete Hain Shaan Se	Govinda Verma		
1988	Mardon Wali Baat	Tinku		
1988	Mohabbat Ke Dushman	Hashim		
1988	Khatron Ke Khiladi	Rajesh		
1988	Kabzaa	Ravi Varma		
1989	Do Qaidi	Manu		
1989	Ilaaka	Inspector Suraj Verma		
1989	Kanoon Apna Apna	Ravi Kumar Singh		
1989	Taaqatwar	Amar Sharma		
1989	Hum Bhi Insaan Hain	Bhola		
1989	Hathyar	Avinash		
1990	Zahreelay	Rakesh "Raka" Rai		
1990	Kroadh	Vijay "Vijju" V. Shukla		
1990	Thanedaar	Brijesh Chander "Birju"		
1990	Tejaa	Tejaa / Sanjay		
1990	Khatarnaak	Suraj "Sunny"		
1990	Jeene Do	Karamveer		
1991	Yodha	Suraj Singh		
1991	Khoon Ka Karz	Arjun		
1991	Fateh	Karan		
1991	Do Matwale	Ajay		
1991	Qurbani Rang Layegi	Raj Kishen		
1991	Saajan	Aman Verma "Poet Sagar"		
1991	Sadak	Ravi Kishore Verma		
1992	Adharm	Vicky Verma		
1992	Sahebzaade	Raja		
1992	Sarphira	Suresh Sinha		
1992	Jeena Marna Tere Sang	Amar Khurana		
1993	Kshatriya	Vikram Singh		
1993	Sahibaan	Kunwar Vijay Pal Singh / Old Narrator		
1993	Khalnayak	Balaram Rakesh Prasad "Ballu"		
1993	Gumrah	Jagan Nath (Jaggu)		
1994	Zamane Se Kya Darna	Vikram "Vicky" V. Singh		
1994	Insaaf Apne Lahoo Se	Raju		
1994	Aatish: Feel the Fire	Baba		
1994	Amaanat	Vijay		
1995	Andolan	Adarsh Pradhan		
1995	Jai Vikraanta	Vikraanta A. Singh		
1996	Vijeta	Ashok		
1996	Namak	Gopal		
1997	Sanam	Narendra Anand "Hero"		
1997	Mahaanta	Sanjay Malhotra "Sanju"		
1997	Daud	Nandu		
1998	Dushman	Suraj Singh Rathod		
1999	Daag: The Fire	Karan Singh		
1999	Kartoos	Raja / Jeet Balraj		
1999	Safari	Kishan 'Captain' Jatin Khanna		
1999	Haseena Maan Jaayegi	Sonu		
1999	Vaastav: The Reality	Raghunath Namdev Shivalkar "Raghu Bhai"		
1999	Khoobsurat	Sanjay Shastri "Sanju"		
2000	Khauff	Anthony / Vicky / Babu		
2000	Baaghi	Raja		
2000	Chal Mere Bhai	Vicky Oberoi		
2000	Jung	Balli		
2000	Mission Kashmir	S.S.P Inayat Khan		
2000	Kurukshetra	ACP Prithviraj Singh		
2001	Jodi No.1	Jai		
2002	Pitaah	Rudra		
2002	Hum Kisise Kum Nahin	Munna Bhai		
2002	Hathyar	Rohit Raghunath Shivalkar/ Raghunath Namdev Shivalkar	Dual role; sequel to Vaastav: The Reality	
2002	Annarth	Iqbal Danger		
2002	Kaante	Jay "Ajju" Rehan		
2003	Ek Aur Ek Gyarah	Sitara		
2003	LOC Kargil	Lt. Col. Yogesh Kumar Joshi		
2003	Munna Bhai M.B.B.S.	Murli Prasad Sharma "Munna Bhai"		
2004	Plan	Mussabhai		
2004	Rudraksh	Varun Deshmukh		
2004	Deewaar	Khan		
2004	Musafir	Billa		
2005	Shabd	Shaukat Vashisht		
2005	Tango Charlie	Vikram Rathore		
2005	Parineeta	Girish Sharma		
2005	Dus	Siddanth Dheer		
2005	Viruddh... Family Comes First	Ali Asgar		
2005	Ek Ajnabee	Hip-Hop MC	Special appearance	
2005	Shaadi No. 1	Lakhwinder "Lucky" Singh Lakha		
2005	Vaah! Life Ho Toh Aisi!	Yamaraj M. A / Himself	Dual role	
2006	Tathastu	Ravi Rajput		
2006	Zinda	Balajit 'Bala' Roy		
2006	Anthony Kaun Hai	Master Madan		
2006	Lage Raho Munna Bhai	Murli Prasad Sharma "Munna Bhai"		
2006	Sarhad Paar	Ranjeet Singh		
2007	Eklavya: The Royal Guard	Pannalal Chohar		
2007	Nehlle Pe Dehlla	Johnny		
2007	Shootout at Lokhandwala	ACP Shamsher Khan		
2007	Dhamaal	Kabir Nayak		
2007	Dus Kahaniyan	Baba Hyderabadi	Anthology film; segment: Rise & Fall	
2008	Mehbooba	Shravan "SD" Dhariwal		
2008	Kidnap	Vikrant Raina		
2008	EMI	Sattarbhai		
2009	Luck	Karim Musa		
2009	Blue	Sagar "Sethji" Singh		
2009	All The Best: Fun Begins	Dharam Kapoor		
2009	Aladin	The Ring Master		
2010	Lamhaa	Vikram Sabharwal / Gul Jahangir		
2010	Knock Out	Veer Vijay Singh		
2010	Tees Maar Khan	Narrator		
2010	No Problem	Yash Ambani		
2010	Toonpur Ka Super Hero	Narrator		
2011	Double Dhamaal	Kabir Nayak		
2011	Chatur Singh Two Star	Chatur Singh		
2011	Rascals	Chetan Chauhan		
2012	Agneepath	Kancha Cheena		
2012	Department	Mahadev Bhonsle		
2012	Son of Sardaar	Balwinder Singh Sandhu ″Billu″		
2013	Zila Ghaziabad	Thakur Pritam Singh		
2013	Policegiri	DCP Rudra "Baba" Aditya Devaraj		
2013	Zanjeer	Sher Khan	Simultaneously shot in Telugu	
2014	Ungli	ACP Ashok Kale		
2014	PK	Bhairon Singh		
2017	Bhoomi	Arun Sachdeva		
2018	Sanju	Himself	Special appearance in the song "Baba Bolta Hai Bas Ho Gaya"	
2018	Saheb, Biwi Aur Gangster 3	Uday Pratap Singh		
2019	Kalank	Balraj Chaudhry		
2019	Prassthanam	Baldev Pratap Singh	Also producer	
2019	Panipat	Ahmad Shah Abdali		
2020	Sadak 2	Ravi Kishore Verma		
2020	Torbaaz	Naseer Ahmad		
2021	Bhuj: The Pride of India	Ranchordas Pagi		
2022	Toolsidas Junior	Mohammad Salaam		
2022	K.G.F: Chapter 2	Adheera	Kannada film	
2022	Samrat Prithviraj	Kaka Kanha		
2022	Shamshera	Daroga Shuddh Singh		
2023	Jawan	STF officer Madhavan Naik	Cameo	
2023	Leo	Antony Das	Tamil film	
2024	Ghudchadi	Veer Sharma		
2024	Double iSmart	Big Bull	Telugu film	
2025	The Bhootnii	Baba		
2025	Housefull 5	Chief Inspector Baba		
2025	Baaghi 4	Chacko		
2025	Dhurandhar	SP Chaudhary Aslam		
2026	The RajaSaab	Pekamedala Kanakaraju	Telugu film	
2026	Dhurandhar The Revenge	SP Chaudhary Aslam		
2026	KD: The Devil	Dhak Deva	Kannada film	
2026	Raja Shivaji	Afzal Khan	Hindi-Marathi bilingual film; debut in Marathi film	
2026	Aakhri Sawal	Prof. Gopal Nadkarni		
2026	7 Dogs	Ranjit	Debut in Saudi Arabian film	
TBA	Baap †	Ballu	Post-production	
TBA	Khalnayak Returns †	Balaram "Ballu" Prasad	Filming	

== Television ==
List of Sanjay Dutt television credits
Year	Title	Notes	Ref.
2011	Bigg Boss 5	Host	
2021	Super Dancer	Guest	
