= List of awards and nominations received by Sanjay Dutt =

Sanjay Dutt awards and nominations
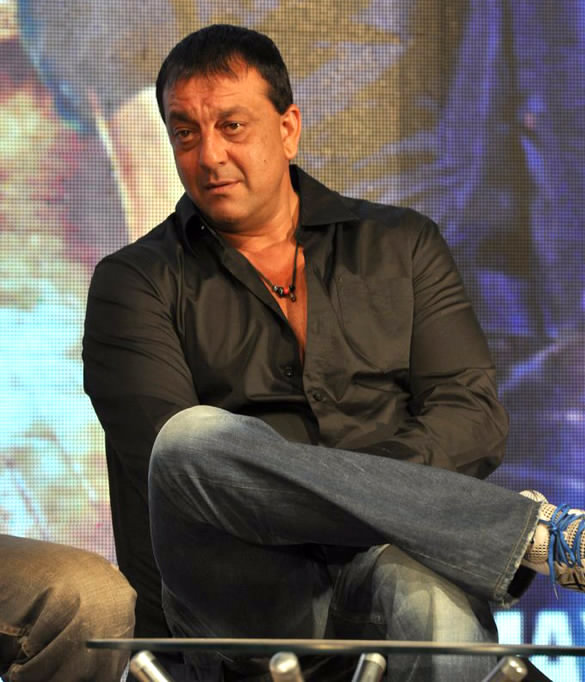
- Dutt at the movie Department's promotional event
Awards and nominations
Award	Wins	Nominations
Filmfare Awards	2	6
Star Screen Awards	3	4
IIFA Awards	2	2
Global Indian Film Awards	1	0
Stardust Awards	3	0
Zee Cine Awards	2	0
Bollywood Movie Awards	2	0
Bengal Film Journalists' Association Awards	1	0
Other awards	2	0

Totals (Note: Certain award groups do not simply award one winner. They acknowledge several different recipients, have runners-up, and have third place. Since this is a specific recognition and is different from losing an award, runner-up mentions are considered wins in this award tally. For simplification and to avoid errors, each award in this list has been presumed to have had a prior nomination.)
- Wins: 18
- Nominations: 12

Sanjay Balraj Dutt (born 29 July 1959) is a popular Indian film actor and producer known for his work in Hindi cinema (Bollywood). The son of veteran Hindi film actors Sunil Dutt and Nargis Dutt, he made his acting debut in Rocky (1981) and has since appeared in more than 187 Hindi films. Although Dutt has been a lead actor in genres ranging from romance to comedy, he has been most popular in the roles of gangsters, thugs and police officers in the drama and action genres. The Indian media and audiences alike refer to him as Deadly Dutt for his portrayals of such characters.

In a film career spanning more than 37 years, Dutt has won two Filmfare Awards, two IIFA Awards, two Bollywood Movie Awards, three Screen Awards, three Stardust Awards, two Zee Cine Awards, and a Global Indian Film Award. Four of his films have won various National Film Awards. He has won most of his awards for Vaastav: The Reality, Mission Kashmir, Munna Bhai M.B.B.S., and Lage Raho Munna Bhai. He won three Best Actor awards for Vaastav: The Reality.

== Filmfare Awards ==
Year	Category	Film	Result
1992	Best Actor	Saajan	Nominated
1994	Best Actor	Khalnayak	Nominated
2000	Best Actor	Vaastav: The Reality	Won
2001	Best Actor	Mission Kashmir	Nominated
2003	Best Supporting Actor	Kaante	Nominated
2004	Best Comedian	Munna Bhai M.B.B.S.	Won
2006	Best Supporting Actor	Parineeta	Nominated
2007	Best Actor	Lage Raho Munna Bhai	Nominated

== Star Screen Awards ==
Year	Category	Film	Result
2000	Best Actor	Vaastav: The Reality	Won
2001	Best Actor	Kurukshetra	Nominated
2001	Best Supporting Actor	Mission Kashmir	Won
2004	Best Actor	Munna Bhai M.B.B.S	Nominated
2005	Best Supporting Actor	Musafir	Nominated
2007	Best Actor (Critics)	Lage Raho Munna Bhai	Won
2013	Best Villain	Agneepath	Nominated

== International Indian Film Academy Awards ==
Year	Category	Film	Result	Ref(s).
2000	Best Actor	Vaastav: The Reality	Won	
2001	Best Actor	Mission Kashmir	Nominated	
2007	Best Actor	Lage Raho Munna Bhai	Nominated	
2010	Best Performance in a Comic Role	All the Best	Won	
2013	Best Actor in a Negative Role	Agneepath	Nominated	

== Global Indian Film Awards ==
Year	Category	Film	Result	Ref(s).
2006	Best Actor (Male) - Critics	Lage Raho Munna Bhai	Won	

== Stardust Awards ==
Year	Category	Film	Result	Ref(s).
2004	Star of the Year Award - Male	Munna Bhai M.B.B.S	Won	
2007	Star of the Year Award - Male	Lage Raho Munna Bhai	Won	
2013	Best Actor in a Negative Role	Agneepath	Won	

== Zee Cine Awards ==
Year	Category	Film	Result	Ref(s).
2001	Zee Premiere Choice - Male	Mission Kashmir	Won	
2007	Best Actor (Male) - Critics	Lage Raho Munna Bhai	Won	

== Bollywood Movie Awards ==
Year	Category	Film	Result
2003	Best Actor (Male) - Critics	Kaante	Won
2004	Most Sensational Actor	Munna Bhai M.B.B.S	Won

== Bengal Film Journalists' Association Awards ==
Year	Category	Film	Result	Ref(s).
2004	Best Actor	Munna Bhai M.B.B.S	Won	

== Other awards ==
Year	Category	Result	Notes
2004	Celebrity Style Male	Won	at the Bollywood Fashion Awards
2008	AXN Best Action Actor - "Sanjay Dutt"	Won	
2014	Best Supporting Actor for PK	Nominated	Bollywood Hungama Surfers' Choice Movie Award

== See also ==
- List of accolades received by Lage Raho Munna Bhai
