= Sanjay Dutt =

Indian actor and film producer (born 1959)

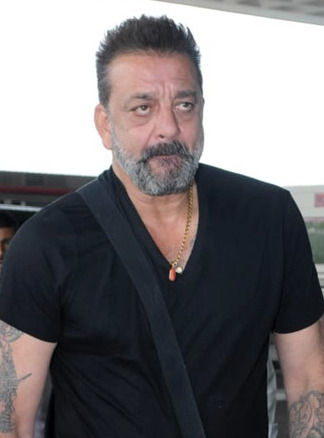
- Dutt in 2018
- Born: Sanjay Balraj Dutt; 29 July 1959 (age 67); Bombay, Bombay State, India (present-day Mumbai, Maharashtra)
- Other names: Sanju; Baba
- Education: Elphinstone College, Mumbai
- Occupations: Actor; playback singer; film producer
- Years active: 1981–present
- Works: Full list
- Political party: Samajwadi Party (2009–2010)
- Spouses: Richa Sharma (m. 1987; died 1996) Rhea Pillai (m. 1998; div. 2008) Manyata Dutt (m. 2008)
- Children: 3
- Parents: Sunil Dutt (father); Nargis Dutt (mother)
- Family: See Dutt family
- Awards: Full list

Signature
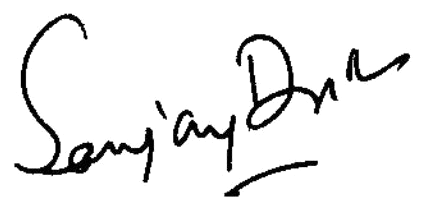

Sanjay Balraj Dutt (born 29 July 1959) is an Indian actor and film producer who works primarily in Hindi cinema, and has also appeared in some Telugu, Kannada, Tamil, Marathi and Punjabi films. He has acted in over 135 films. Known for his versatile roles, style, and intensity, he has often portrayed flawed heroes on screen. Dutt has received awards such as two Filmfare Awards, three Screen Awards and a Global Indian Film Award.

Part of the Dutt family, he is the son of actor-politicians Sunil Dutt and Nargis. Dutt made his acting debut with Rocky (1981), directed by his father. A career slump followed, with notable exceptions being Vidhaata (1982) and Naam (1986). He emerged a major star in the early-1990s with Thanedaar (1990) and Saajan (1991) and had further hits with Sadak (1991), Adharm (1992), Gumrah (1993) and Khalnayak (1993). Following a setback owing to his case, Dutt appeared in commercially successful ventures, such as Daag: The Fire (1999), Haseena Maan Jaayegi (1999), Vaastav: The Reality (1999), Khoobsurat (1999), Mission Kashmir (2000), Kurukshetra (2000), Jodi No. 1 (2001), Kaante (2002), Munna Bhai M.B.B.S. (2003), Dus (2005), Parineeta (2005), Lage Raho Munna Bhai (2006), Shootout at Lokhandwala (2007), Dhamaal (2007), All the Best (2009), Double Dhamaal (2011), Agneepath (2012), Son of Sardaar (2012), PK (2014), KGF: Chapter 2 (2022), Leo (2023), Dhurandhar (2025) and Dhurandhar: The Revenge (2026), which emerged as his highest-grossing release.

In April 1993, Dutt was arrested under the Terrorist and Disruptive Activities (Prevention) Act (TADA) and the Arms Act, and was later convicted under the Arms Act for possession of illegal weapons, including Type 56 rifles, procured from others accused in the 1993 Bombay bombings. He was sentenced to five years in prison, and after periods of bail, completed his sentence in 2016. Dutt's life has been the subject of considerable media coverage in India, and in 2018, Sanju, a biopic based on his life, starring Ranbir Kapoor as Dutt; the film was one of the highest-grossers of Indian cinema.

== Early life ==
Dutt was born in Bombay, Bombay State (now Mumbai, Maharashtra), to Hindi cinema actors Sunil Dutt and Nargis Dutt. He studied at The Lawrence School, Sanawar, and later at Elphinstone College, Mumbai.

Born to a Hindu father and a Muslim mother, Dutt's ancestry through his father and maternal grandfather traces back to the Rawalpindi Division of western Punjab (in present-day Pakistan), with his paternal village being Khurd in Jhelum District. His Hindu paternal family resettled in the small village of Mandauli on the bank of the river Yamuna, located in the Yamunanagar District of East Punjab (now in Haryana) after the Hindu-Muslim violence across the country, following the partition of India in 1947.

Dutt is the maternal grandson of Jaddanbai from Benares, who came from a family of tawaifs (courtesans) with ancestral links to the Mughal court, and worked as a director, producer, actress, also being among the earliest female music composers in Hindi cinema. Through Jaddanbai, Dutt is the nephew of character actor Anwar Hussain, Nargis's half-brother. Dutt has two sisters, Priya Dutt, a politician, and Namrata Dutt, who is married to actor Kumar Gaurav, the son of actor Rajendra Kumar.

Dutt's given name was chosen by crowdsourcing via the film magazine Shama. His mother died in 1981, shortly before the premiere of his debut film; her death has been cited in accounts of the onset of his drug use. Dutt made his acting debut as a child, playing a qawali singer in his father's film Reshma Aur Shera (1971).

== Career ==
=== Breakthrough (1981–1989) ===
Dutt made his Bollywood film debut with Rocky (1981). He then appeared in Vidhaata—the highest-grossing Hindi film of 1982—alongside Dilip Kumar, Shammi Kapoor, and Sanjeev Kumar, and in Main Awara Hoon (1983) and Zameen Aasmaan (1984). In 1985, he shot Jaan Ki Baazi, his first release in two years.

The film Naam (1986) is described by commentators as a turning point in Dutt's career and was a critical and commercial success. During the late 1980s, he appeared in box-office hits including Imaandaar, Inaam Dus Hazaar (1987), Jeete Hain Shaan Se (1988), Mardon Wali Baat (1988), Ilaaka (1989), Hum Bhi Insaan Hain (1989), Kanoon Apna Apna (1989), and Taaqatwar (1989).

His performances in Kabzaa (1988) and J. P. Dutta's Hathyar (1989) were both well received by critics; trade sources classify both films as having average box-office returns. In the same period, he appeared in multi-starrer projects with actors including Govinda, Mithun, Dharmendra, Jackie Shroff, and Sunny Deol.

=== Rise to prominence (1990–1993) ===
In the early 1990s, Dutt's releases include Tejaa (1990), Khatarnaak (1990), Zahreelay, (1990) Thanedaar (1990), Khoon Ka Karz (1991), Yalgaar (1992), Gumrah (1993), Sahibaan (1993), and Aatish: Feel the Fire (1994). He also starred in Sadak (1991), Saajan (1991), and Khalnayak (1993); he received nominations for the Filmfare Award for Best Actor for Saajan and Khalnayak.

The Hindu wrote that "Dutt's earlier films (like Naam and Sadak) got him a lot of favourable attention", and "Saajan established Dutt as the conventional soft hero." Saajan was the highest-grossing Bollywood film of 1991, and Sadak ranked fifth. Khalnayak was the second-highest-grossing film of 1993. This was followed by another box office success Gumrah, this was Dutt's second consecutive hit that year.

=== Arrest and later career (1993–1998) ===
In March 1993, Bombay (now Mumbai) experienced a series of bombings later attributed to organised crime and terrorist networks. Dutt was among several Bollywood figures charged in connection with the case; prosecutors alleged that Dutt received weapons at his residence from Abu Salem and co-accused Riyaz Siddiqui as part of a consignment linked to those involved in the bombings. In his confession, Dutt stated that he had obtained a single Type-56 rifle from the producers of the movie Sanam, for family protection. Reports suggest that his father Sunil Dutt's political activity influenced how the case proceeded.

Dutt's first film after his 1993 arrest was Daud (1997); trade sources describe its box-office results as average. He followed this with Dushman (1998) which performed well commercially.

=== Resurgence (1999–2002) ===
1999 was an excellent year for Dutt and one that is regarded as his comeback, with all of his five releases being among the highest-grossing films of that year. He began it by starring in the Mahesh Bhatt-directed film Kartoos, followed by Khoobsurat, Haseena Maan Jaayegi, Daag: The Fire and Vaastav: The Reality, for which he won many awards, including his first Filmfare Award for Best Actor. His role in 2000's Mission Kashmir won him critical acclaim and a number of awards and nominations, including his fourth nomination for the Filmfare Award for Best Actor. Dutt was also invited by the President of India to Rashtrapati Bhavan for his performance in the film.

As the decade went on, he continued to play lead roles in critical and commercial successes such as Jodi No.1 (2001), Pitaah (2002) and Kaante (2002), which earned him his first nomination for the Filmfare Award for Best Supporting Actor.

=== Munna Bhai and transition to supporting roles (2003–2014) ===
He played the lead role in the National Award-winning film Munna Bhai M.B.B.S. (2003), which garnered him several awards, including his first Filmfare Award for Best Comedian. At the box office, Munna Bhai M.B.B.S. achieved a silver jubilee status (25-week run) being one of only eight films to have achieved this status since the year 2000. In its 26th week of release, the film could still be found playing on 257 screens throughout India. Later successes came with Musafir (2004), Plan (2004), Parineeta (2005), which earned him his second nomination for the Filmfare Award for Best Supporting Actor, and Dus (2005). He also won critical acclaim for his performances in Shabd (2005) and Zinda (2006).

The sequel of Munna Bhai M.B.B.S., Lage Raho Munna Bhai was released on 1 September 2006, for which Dutt received a number of awards, along with an award from the Prime Minister Manmohan Singh for his work in the Munna Bhai series. NDTV India counted the character Munna Bhai as one of top 20 fictional characters in Bollywood. Dutt earned his fifth nomination for the Filmfare Award for Best Actor for his performance in the film.

In January 2008, the Indian film Institute Filmfare listed 12 films featuring Dutt in its list of the top 100 highest-grossing movies of all time. In its May 2013 edition "100 years of Indian cinema", Filmfare listed three films featuring Dutt in its top 20 list of highest-grossing Hindi films of all time, adjusted for inflation these films were Lage Raho Munna Bhai, Khalnayak and Saajan. Later, Dutt starred in other successful movies like Dhamaal (2007), Shootout at Lokhandwala (2007), All the Best (2009), Double Dhamaal (2011), Son of Sardaar (2012) Agneepath (2012) and PK (2014).

=== Career expansion in supporting roles (2016–present) ===
Vidhu Vinod Chopra on 29 September 2016 announced that the third part of Munna Bhai series, starring Dutt in the title role, would begin soon. However, as of 2024, production on the film has still not commenced.

In 2017, following his return to prison in 2013 to serve the remainder of his sentence and his release in 2016, Dutt appeared as the lead in Bhoomi, directed by Omung Kumar. In 2018, he starred in Saheb, Biwi Aur Gangster 3. On 29 June 2018, his biopic Sanju released in which he made a special appearance. He then produced and starred in Prassthanam, which released on 20 September 2019.

Due to the COVID pandemic, Dutt then had four OTT releases. First was Sadak 2, a sequel to his 1991 film Sadak, co starring Alia Bhatt and Aditya Roy Kapur. The trailer for the film became the most disliked trailer of all time, with fans critical of nepotism following the death of Sushant Singh Rajput. The film was universally panned and some claimed it to be one of the worst films in Dutt's career. Then came Netflix release Torbaaz, an action thriller set in Afghanistan. His 2021 release Bhuj: The Pride of India, which featured an ensemble cast consisting of Ajay Devgn, Sonakshi Sinha and Nora Fatehi, also received negative reviews. However, in 2022, Dutt appeared in Toolsidas Junior, a sports drama which won the National Film Award for Best Feature Film in Hindi.

Also in 2022, Dutt made his debut in Kannada cinema as Adheera, the main antagonist in K.G.F: Chapter 2, the sequel to the blockbuster Kannada film, K.G.F: Chapter 1. The movie was a financial success. However, his other 2022 theatrical releases were financial flops - the period epic Shamshera, directed by Karan Malhotra and starring Ranbir Kapoor, in which he again played a key antagonist, and Samrat Prithviraj alongside Akshay Kumar.

In 2023, Dutt performed a cameo in Shah Rukh Khan starrer Jawan and played a key antagonist in Lokesh Kanagaraj's Leo (2023) alongside Vijay, making his debut in Tamil cinema. Both were huge financial successes. In 2024, he reunited with Raveena Tandon in the digital film Ghudchadi and made his Telugu cinema debut with Puri Jagannadh's Double iSmart, which was a box office debacle. In 2025, he returned to lead roles, playing the lead in The Bhootnii, which was poorly received and failed at the box office. He next appeared in Housefull 5 in 2025 as Chief Inspector Baba. The film was a commercial success. In the same year, he starred in Baaghi 4 alongside Tiger Shroff, playing the main antagonist. Critics noted that Dutt's role was too brief for him to make an impact. The film was poorly received and underperformed commercially. His last release of 2025 was the action-thriller Dhurandhar, where he played a supporting role. The film went on to become the highest grossing Indian film of 2025 and one of the highest grossing Hindi films of all time. Dutt started the year 2026 with the Telugu film The Raja Saab, which received negative reviews, eventually becoming a box office bomb. Dutt next appeared in Dhurandhar: The Revenge, which also got successful like first part.

Dutt appeared in his Marathi debut in the Marathi-Hindi bilingual Raja Shivaji. He will next appear in Baap, the Kannada film KD - The Devil, an untitled film with Arshad Warsi, his production The Virgin Tree and the big-budget international film The Good Maharaja.

== Off-screen work ==
=== Hosting ===
Dutt co-hosted the fifth season of the Indian reality show Bigg Boss along with Salman Khan. The show aired on Colors television from 2 October 2011 to 7 January 2012. Dutt later said it was Khan who persuaded him to co-host the show.

== Personal life ==
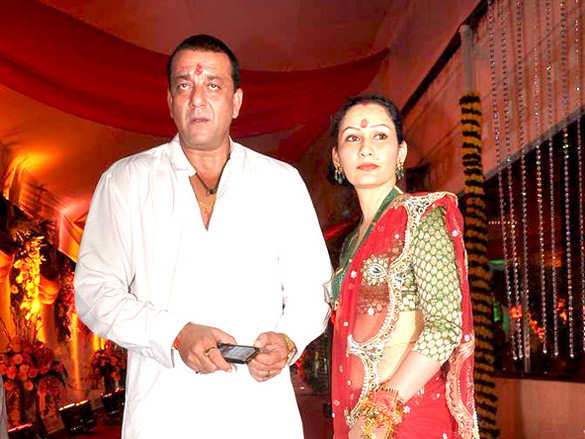
Dutt with his wife Manyata in 2011.

=== Relationships ===
In the early 1980s, Dutt had a relationship with his co-star from his first film, Tina Munim. After this relationship ended, Dutt married actress Richa Sharma in 1987. She died of a brain tumour in 1996. The couple have a daughter born in 1988, who lives in the United States with her maternal grandparents.

Dutt's second marriage was to air-hostess-turned-model Rhea Pillai on 14 February 1998. The divorce finalised in 2008. Dutt married Manyata (born Dilnawaz Sheikh) first registered in Goa in 2008 and then, in a Hindu ceremony in Mumbai, after two years of dating. On 21 October 2010, he became a father to twins, a boy and a girl.

=== Religion ===
Dutt practices Hinduism and calls himself a devotee of Shiva. In January 2024, he performed the pinda dana, a Hindu ritual that involves paying homage to ancestors, for his deceased parents.

=== Political activities ===
Dutt's father was a long term Congress leader, known for his secular standings. His sister, Priya, is also a former Congress Member of Parliament.

Dutt has said that "I am not a politician but I belong to a political family." He was to contest the 2009 Lok Sabha elections as a candidate for the Samajwadi Party, but withdrew when the court refused to suspend his conviction. He was then appointed General Secretary of the Samajwadi Party, leaving that post in December 2010.

In 2024, rumours of Dutt joining politics and contesting elections again came up, but he put them to rest saying that he was not made for politics.

=== Health issues ===
Sanjay Dutt was diagnosed with stage 4 lung cancer. He took treatment in Mumbai and now has recovered from lung cancer.

Dutt has publicly discussed his long struggle with substance abuse, particularly during his younger years. He began experimenting with drugs in his college days and later described that period as "nine years of hell" during which he used various narcotics before seeking help and entering rehabilitation. He has said that he started doing drugs to feel confident and to "look cool", and that after rehab people called him a charsi (junkie), which motivated him to transform his life. He also recounted waking up after a prolonged drug binge and recognising the harm it had caused to his life, which prompted him to seek help and eventually overcome the addiction. In discussing his recovery, Dutt has spoken about the constant fear of relapse, saying that even thinking about "smoking up a joint" would threaten his sobriety, and that he channelled his energy into fitness instead.

Dutt has also acknowledged a long history with tobacco, including anecdotes about smoking in difficult personal moments.

=== 1993 Bombay bombings case ===
During the investigations of the bombings in 1993 in Mumbai, then known as Bombay, Dutt's name also came up as being involved in the matter. It was alleged that Dutt accepted a delivery of weapons at his house from Abu Salem and co-accused Riyaz Siddiqui, who had also been implicated in relation to the Bombay blasts. It was claimed that the weapons formed a part of a large consignment of arms connected to the terrorists. Dutt, in his confession admitted that he had taken one Type-56 from the producers of his movie Sanam, allegedly for his own family protection.

On 19 April 1993, after initial reporting by crime reporter Baljeet Parmar on Dutt's possession of the AK-56, he was arrested under the provisions of the Terrorist and Disruptive Activities (Prevention) Act (TADA). Dutt was granted bail by the Supreme Court of India on 5 May 1993. Dutt's arrest coincided with the release of his film, Khalnayak, in which he played a wanted criminal. Khalnayak was released on 6 August 1993, after Dutt's released on Bail and the film's major success was in part due to his off-screen legal controversy.

Dutt's bail was cancelled on 4 July 1994 by the designated TADA (Terrorist and Disruptive Activities Act) court in Mumbai and he was re-arrested. On 16 October 1995 he was granted bail by Supreme Court. Abdul Qayyum Abdul Karim Shaikh, who was thought to be a close aide of the terrorists' ringleader, Dawood Ibrahim, was arrested.

On 31 July 2007, the Special TADA Court acquitted Dutt of the charges relating to the Mumbai blast; however, the TADA court sentenced Dutt to six years' rigorous imprisonment under Arms act for illegal possession of AK-56 weapon. According to The Guardian, "The actor claimed he feared for his life after the notorious 'Black Friday' bombings, which were allegedly staged by Mumbai's Muslim-dominated mafia in retaliation for deadly Hindu-Muslim clashes a few months earlier. But the judge rejected this defence and also refused bail." Dutt was returned to at the Arthur Road Jail and soon after moved to the Yerawada Central Jail in Pune. Dutt appealed against the sentence and was granted interim bail on 20 August 2007 until such time as the TADA court provided him with a copy of its judgement. On 22 October 2007 Dutt was back in jail but again applied for bail. On 27 November 2007, Dutt was granted bail by the Supreme Court.

On 21 March 2013 the Supreme Court upheld the verdict but shortened the sentence to five years' imprisonment, counting in term served. Dutt was given a month to surrender before the authorities. He was given four weeks to surrender to the authorities, the court having refused to release him on probation due to the severity of the offence.

On 10 May, the Supreme Court rejected Dutt's review petition for the reconsideration of his conviction and asked him to surrender on the stipulated date. On 14 May, Dutt withdrew the mercy plea and surrendered to the Mumbai Police on 16 May 2013. Just before the surrender, the Mumbai jail authority got an anonymous letter threatening Dutt's life. Dutt filed an appeal to allow him to surrender before entering Yerwada Central Jail. Later, Dutt withdrew this request too. He was paroled from 21 December 2013. The parole was extended three times until March 2014, raising concern in Bombay High Court and a proposal from the Government of Maharashtra to amend the law of parole. He returned to Yerwada Central Jail after his parole ended. Dutt was out on a two weeks' furlough granted by the Yerwada Central Jail authorities on 24 December. He was subsequently incarcerated in Yerwada Central Jail, to complete his jail term. He was released from there on 25 February 2016 after serving his sentence.

== Legacy ==
Dutt is regarded as one of the most popular actors of Indian cinema. Known for his versatile roles, style and intensity, he has often portrayed flawed heroes on screen which brought him commercial success as well as accolades.

One of the most successful actors of the 1990s and 2000s, Dutt appeared in Box Office India's "Top Actors" list three times from 1991 to 1993. He topped the list twice in 1992 and 1993.

In 2022, he placed in Outlook India's "75 Best Bollywood Actors" list.

== In popular culture ==
- The author Yasser Usman published a biographical book on Sanjay Dutt, titled Sanjay Dutt: The Crazy Untold Story of Bollywood's Bad Boy, in 2018.
- Sanju is a 2018 Hindi film, based on Sanjay Dutt's life. His role was essayed by actor Ranbir Kapoor.
- In 2020, Sidhu Moose Wala released a song Sanju, comparing his AK-47 possession and firing case with Dutt.

== Bibliography ==
- Yasser, Usman (2018). Sanjay Dutt: The Crazy Untold Story of Bollywood's Bad Boy. Juggernaut Books. ISBN 978-81-93284-18-6.
- Mukherjee, Ram Kamal (2019). Sanjay Dutt, One Man, Many Lives. Rupa & Co. ISBN 978-93-5333-452-9.
