= Behram Contractor =

Indian journalist (1930–2001)

- Born: 1930
- Died: 9 April 2001 (aged 70–71)
- Other name: Busybee

Behram Contractor (1930 – 9 April 2001), popularly known as Busybee, was an Indian journalist, humorist, and the founding editor of The Afternoon Despatch & Courier, a weekly that was published in Mumbai between 1985 and 2019.

== Humorist ==
A tribute paid to him online says: "In the history of Indian journalism, there will never be another humorist like Busybee; he was the Art Buchwald of India, the P.G. Wodehouse of our times and more, a writer with a brilliant sense of timing for satire and humour, but with a soft and sensitive pen. And with a flow of words that could have readers rolling in their living rooms, offices and suburban trains on their way home; or moist-eyed with emotion and sepia-tinged nostalgia. That was Busybee." (About Busybee)

== Career ==
A popular writer, Contractor worked at The Free Press Journal, The Times of India (Bombay), and Mid-Day before founding his own newspaper The Afternoon Despatch and Courier (better known as Afternoon) in 1985. He wrote a column about his distinctive Parsi heritage, customs and food.

== Column, as Busybee ==
Contractor continued to write articles for the Times of India and the Midday under the pen name Busybee even while serving as editor of his own paper, and wrote the column Round and About.

== Food writer ==
Contractor also wrote the series "Eating Out," which featured one of the best Mumbai restaurants, giving a glimpse of many Indian and international cuisines. Described as "the first food writer of the country," Contractor also served as the editor of UpperCrust, a publication that honored him with 50 quotations.

== Awards, etc. ==
He was awarded the Padma Shri in 1990, and the Goenka Award for Excellence in Journalism in 1996.

== Book ==
In 1998, Contractor published From Bombay to Mumbai, a collection of the best of Busybee's columns from 1996 and 1997.

== Personal life ==
He was a Parsi.

In 1985, the "almost confirmed bachelor", as his wife-to-be described him later, married Farzana Contractor, also a journalist. Behram Contractor died in 2001 from a heart attack.

== Afternoon Despatch & Courier ==
Writing about the newspaper he founded in 1985, his wife Farzana Contractor has commented that she "was among the three reasons that prompted the famous Behram Contractor to launch [The] Afternoon. She recalled the early days of the launch as being tough times.

The paper proprietor Kamal Morarka when it was shut.
