= Magna Publications =

American communications company

Magna Publications, Inc.
- Status: Active
- Founded: 1972, Madison, WI
- Founder: William Haight
- Country of origin: United States
- Headquarters location: Madison, Wisconsin
- Distribution: Worldwide
- Key people: William Haight; David Burns
- Nonfiction topics: higher education, professional development, student affairs
- No. of employees: 10
- Official website: www.magnapubs.com

Magna Publications, Inc., also referred to as Magna, is a communications company that publishes newspapers about higher education and manages on-site and online higher education seminars, workshops, and conferences.

== History ==
Magna Publications is a Madison, Wisconsin based communications company that publishes higher education newsletters and manages onsite and online higher education seminars, workshops and conferences. Since William Haight founded the company in 1972, it has grown to the production of ten newsletters, three national conferences, numerous online and onsite seminars and workshops, and a business magazine.

Magna Publications, Inc. has achieved a leadership position in higher education newsletter publishing and higher education professional development online seminars. The newsletters are published monthly or semi-monthly and focus on specific aspects of teaching or administration. These products carry no advertising and are sold on an annual subscription basis. Titles include: The Teaching Professor, and Academic Leader,

The company's Teaching Professor newsletter also hosts the annual Teaching Professor Conference for higher education teaching professors to explore the art and science of good teaching. The annual Maryellen Weimer Scholarly Work on Teaching and Learning Award is presented annually to recognize an individual's outstanding scholarly contributions with the potential to advance college-level teaching and learning practices. An expert panel of authors, editors, and faculty familiar with pedagogical literature selected one winner and two finalists from a pool of more than 100 submissions. Previously known as the McGraw-Hill and Magna Publications Award for Scholarly Work on Teaching and Learning, the award was renamed in 2011 in honor of Maryellen Weimer, long-time editor of The Teaching Professor newsletter.

In 1999 Magna acquired the National Center for Student Leadership (formerly the National Conference on Student Leadership) which hosts twice-a-year conferences for student leaders and campus administrators, along with an online website which sells student leadership and campus administrator training materials.

Magna also has a magazine division which produces a business magazine and website www.IBMadison.com for the Madison, Wisconsin area.

In 2011, Magna Publications and Sonic Foundry website partnered to present a live online seminar featuring the authors of "Academically Adrift: Limited Learning on College Campuses".
