= Kamal Morarka =

Indian industrialist (1946–2021)

Union Minister of State in the Prime Minister's Office
- In office 21 November 1990 – 21 June 1991
- Prime Minister: Chandra Shekhar

Member of Parliament, Rajya Sabha
- In office 3 April 1988 – 2 April 1994
- Constituency: Rajasthan

Personal details
- Born: 18 June 1946
- Died: 15 January 2021 (aged 74)

Kamal Morarka (18 June 1946 – 15 January 2021) was an Indian union minister and businessman. He was a National president of the Samajwadi Janata Party (Rashtriya).

== Political career ==
When Janata Dal was formed in 1988, he was made treasurer of Janata Dal. He was Minister of State in Prime Minister's Office under Prime Minister-ship of Chandra Shekhar from 1990 to 1991. He was member of Rajya Sabha from Rajasthan in 1988.

In 2012, he became the head of Samajwadi Janata Party (Rashtriya) started by Chandra Shekhar and Devi Lal after they broke away from Janata Dal in 1990.

In 2016 Rajya Sabha election, he was backed Indian National Congress backed him an independent candidate for Rajasthan polls. He received 34 votes of which 24 of Indian National Congress, four of National People's Party, two of BSP and four Independents. But he lost and BJP won all 4 seats on offer.

== Business career ==
Morarka was chairman of Morarka Organic a Private Sector Organisation that offers services in Food Processing/ Beverages. He was also the owner of the biggest clothing mill in Indore, name Hukumchandra mill. Hukumchandra mill was closed in 1990 due to financial crisis, that produced biggest unemployment in the history of Indore. From 1990 to 2020 still all due is pending for more than 5000 workers. Most of the people died in these years, still, they are fighting with the MP government for their rights. Kamal Morarka is still an owner of few heritage "Havelis" in Rajasthan mostly in Nawalgarh. The most famous haveli is Kamal Morarka Haveli Museum, that is also a private museum. It was built in 1900 by Shri Jairamdasji Morarka (ancestor of Kamal Morarka), a connoisseur and patron of the arts.

== Personal life ==
He was born in a traditional Marwari family on 18 June 1946 in Nawalgarh, Rajasthan. He was Vice President of Board of Control for Cricket in India as well as Vice President of Rajasthan Cricket Association. Kamal Morarka was also known to have a keen eye for art and he was also interested in philanthropy.
