= Mohan Deep =

Indian writer

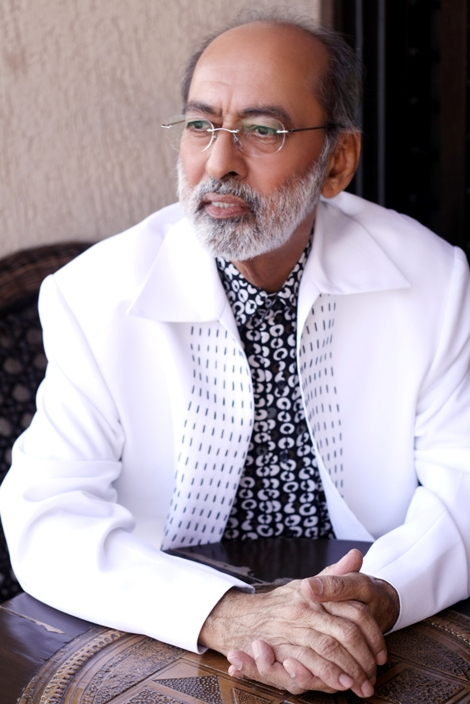
- Mohan Deep
- Born: Mohan Kishinchand Chandirramani; 1948 (age 77–78); Agra, India
- Occupation: Author
- Notable work: The Mystery and Mystique of Madhubala; Eurekha! Simply Scandalous: Meena Kumari; It's My Life; The Five Foolish Virgins; Color Me Rich

Mohan Deep (born Mohan Kishinchand Chandirramani in 1948), is an Indian writer. He has written multiple books on Bollywood film personalities, including the books: The Mystery and Mystique of Madhubala, Simply Scandalous: Meena Kumari, and Eurekha!: The Intimate Life Story of Rekha (an unauthorised biography of Rekha). In recent years, he has focused on writing fiction. Two of his novels are The Five Foolish Virgins (2013) and Color Me Rich (2016).

== Early and personal life ==
Deep was born as Mohan Kishinchand Chandirramani and his family belonged to a Sindhi (Hyderabadi Aamil) family that migrated from Karachi (Sind) (now in Pakistan) in the wake of the partition. He spent his early life in Bombay's western suburbs, Kandivli.

He started as a short story writer and novelist in Sindhi when he was doing his schooling. His published work includes over 200 short stories, two novels namely Surg Munhje Baahun Mein (Heaven in My Arms; 1964) and Khaali Haath (Empty Hands; 1969), a collection of short stories entitled Parai Aurat (The Other Woman; 1970) and a collection of poems named Munhje Paachhe jo Hik Hisso (1972). He started writing in English after getting an honours degree in English literature from the University of Pune in 1974. He was actively associated with Sahitya Akademi. His works are known for their psychological approach.

== Literary career ==
Deep's first biography, about actress Madhubala, was The Mystery and Mystique of Madhubala, published by Magna Books. The family, specially Madhubala's sister, opposed the book. The family, described as Dehlavis by Mohan Deep, disputed the surname and insisted that they were Khans. The author countered that the name on her grave, written in Urdu, was Mumtaz Jehan Begum Dehlavi.

In the unofficial biography, published in 1996, he claims that Madhubala's husband Kishore Kumar regularly whipped her, who would later show her lashes to Naushad. He also stated that the versions about Madhubala's sickness and death provided by her family members did not match with those provided by Kishore Kumar's family members. Deep also questioned whether Madhubala was really ill or whether her ailing was a fabrication. Deep claims that Madhubala was forced to wear heavy shackles and whipped mercilessly in real life, and during the shooting of additional unreleased footage for the classic Mughal-e-Azam (1960), which he contends is proven by the fact that only a minor part of the total number of reels shot for the film were released to the public. He further claims that the additional footage of the film earned Kishore Kumar a lot of money which he earned forcing by Madhubala to work as a sex slave during the shoot. The book was heavily criticized on its release by industry veterans such as Shammi Kapoor, Shakti Samanta and Paidi Jairaj.

At the time when Madhubala was released, there was competition between publishers Magna Publishing and Times Group. Times Group was very critical of the book. Simply Scandalous: Meena Kumari, his biography on Meena Kumari, published by Image Books, was loved by fans and media alike. It was serialized in Mumbai's Hindi daily Dopahar Ka Saamna.

As a part of a trilogy, in 1999, Deep wrote Eurekha!, an unauthorized biography of Bollywood actress Rekha, with Shivani Publications. This, too, was controversial.

Mohan Deep is best known as the only Indian author to have written what are described as 'unauthorised biographies, he also wrote a novel, It's My Life (1997).

Deep moved into a different genre; historical fiction. In 2002, he wrote Nehru and the Tantrik Woman. It was inspired by the revelations about the illegitimate child of the first prime minister of India, Jawaharlal Nehru, by his private secretary M. O. Mathai. The play was set in 1975–77 when, then-prime minister Indira Gandhi had imposed emergency rule in India. The censor board for the theatre refused to give permission to stage the play, even after a stormy meeting between the author and the board members. The script was published as a book by Image Books with the same title, Nehru and the Tantrik Woman.

His next was an entirely different theme, feng shui. Feng Shui for the Bold and Beautiful, the Rich and Famous was published in 2001. It was launched by Bollywood star Ajay Devgn.

The Five Foolish Virgins (2013) was a novel. The Five Foolish Virgins, is a fictional take on the world of cinema. Color Me Rich (2016) was the tenth book, and the 3rd novel of the author.

== Bibliography ==
Title	Year	Genre	Publisher	ISBN
Color Me Rich	2016	Novel	Quest Mercury	ISBN 9788192678528
The Five Foolish Virgins	2013	Novel	Quest Mercury	ISBN 9788192678504
Nehru & Tantrik Woman	2002	Historical fiction	Image Books	ISBN 9788190109253
Feng Shui for the Bold & Beautiful, the Rich & Famous	2001	Non-fiction	Tristar Publications	ISBN 9788190107914
Four Options	2000	Quiz Book	Book Quest Publishers	ISBN 9788186025109
Eurekha!: The Intimate Life Story of Rekha	1999	Biography	Shivani Publications	NA
Simply Scandalous: Meena Kumari	1998	Biography	Image Books	NA
It's My Life	1997	Novel	Magna Publications	NA
The Mystery and Mystique of Madhubala	1996	Biography	Magna Publications	NA
The Silhouettes	1983	Non-fiction	Nimma Publications	NA

== Other activities ==
Besides writing, Mohan Deep was into painting and oriental philosophy. Much before feng shui became popular in India, he had started experimenting with the ancient oriental philosophy and science of Geomancy. Mohan Deep and became a Feng Shui Master in 2001.

He was also the editor of an English news-weekly Suvidha Express for over two years and then moved to edit and write for filmtvindia.com, a Bollywood related web site.

== See also ==
- List of Indian writers
