= Rajesh Khanna: The Untold Story of India's First Superstar =

2014 Indian biographical book by Yasser Usman

- First edition
- Author: Yasser Usman
- Audio read by: Anuj Dutta
- Language: English
- Subject: Rajesh Khanna
- Genre: Biography
- Published: 5 December 2014
- Publisher: Penguin Books
- Publication place: India
- Media type: Print
- Pages: 352
- ISBN: 978-9-351-18875-9

Rajesh Khanna: The Untold Story of India's First Superstar is a 2014 Indian biographical book written by Yasser Usman and is about the Indian film actor and politician Rajesh Khanna. The book describes Khanna's birth in Amritsar during the partition of India in 1942, his 46-year-long acting and political career, his well-publicized marriage to the actor Dimple Kapadia, with whom he had daughters Twinkle and Rinke, and his death in 2012.

Rajesh Khanna was Usman's first published work. He was in Mumbai recording a show for his employer, ABP News, when he heard news of Khanna's death. Usman's editor, Shazi Zaman, asked him to research Khanna's life. Usman collected several archives of magazines and interviews, and compiled them in a book that was later published on 5 December 2014 by Penguin Books and received positive critical reviews.

== Synopsis ==
Rajesh Khanna opens with an article about the death of Rajesh Khanna in 2012. It follows by the information about his birth in Amritsar during the partition of India in 1942 and his adoption to his family's relatives Chunillal and Leelawati, which was followed by their move to Bombay (present-day Mumbai). The book chronicles Khanna's acting career, including his debut in the drama Aakhri Khat (1966), in which he portrays a sculptor; the film was a commercial failure but critical success. He starred as an Indian Air Force officer in Aradhana (1969), for which he received his first nomination for Filmfare Award for Best Actor. In 1971, he played a man who has lymphosarcoma in Anand, which won him the Filmfare Award in the Best Actor category and has been described as one of his best films.

The book also covers Khanna's well-publicized marriage in 1973 to the then-newcomer actor Dimple Kapadia, with whom he has two daughters Twinkle and Rinke, born in 1974 and 1977 respectively. Khanna and Kapadia later separated in 1982, though they never officially divorced. The book continues with Khanna's political career, from his nomination as a candidate for the Indian National Congress in 1991 and his win against the Bharatiya Janata Party's Shatrughan Sinha the next year to his resignation in 1996. Khanna made his television debut with Apne Paraye (2001) and in association with Rishi Kapoor, made a television series titled Raghukul Reet Sada Chali Aayi (2007). The book ends with Khanna's illness and death.

== Development and release ==
"Rajesh Khanna exemplified the real definition of stardom ... People from abroad would come specially to see him. But he, as a person, was an outcome of a series of loss. Since childhood, he was left alone or abandoned by people he loved ... When he was barely five or six, he was given away by his parents. He could never come to terms with this loss that he become a foster child."

— Usman on Khanna, from his 2015 interview to Karan Bhardwaj of The Pioneer

Rajesh Khanna is Yasser Usman's first published book and the first part in his "untold" trilogy. When Khanna died on 18 July 2012, Usman was in Mumbai to record a show for the news channel ABP News. He wrote in the book's foreword that the news of Khanna's death was much discussed on the social media platforms like Facebook and Twitter. The same evening, Usman received a call from his channel's editor Shazi Zaman, stating that their channel would produce a documentary about Khanna's death; Zaman also asked him to research Khanna's last years and interview number of people who were close to Khanna.^{:xiii–xiv}

The next day, Usman watched news coverage of Khanna's funeral procession and later stated that the event motivated him to wrote a book about Khanna.^{:xiv} He collected archive of magazines—such as Filmfare, Star & Style and Super—and various interviews of Khanna. When Usman met people who had been close with Khanna, several of them asked "What exactly are you writing about him?".^{:xv} Usman said many of them refused to talk about Khanna, especially his death, and found that Khanna's life before the release of Aradhana (1969) was "hardly ... documented".^{:xv} In his research, Usman noticed Khanna never mentioned anything about his biological parents and could not find any photographs of them. Usman supposed Khanna "had undone his past in his mind". Usman tried to meet Khanna's wife Kapadia but she never responded to him.^{:xvi}

Rajesh Khanna was released by Penguin Books on 5 December 2014 on Amazon Kindle. The book's cover was designed by Aashim Raj and featured Khanna's photograph by cinematographers Jagdish and Shyam Aurangabadkar. After the publication, Usman received handwritten letters and emails from Khanna's fans.^{:352} He said "some still find their way into my inbox"; many of the letter-writers said they "were distressed, and surprised, to learn Rajesh Khanna's loneliness, little known about before".^{:xii} It motivated Usman to research other popular film stars' lives.^{:ix} The book was published in a paperback edition on 13 December 2014 and 1 May 2018, while the audiobook version (narrated by Anuj Dutta) was released by Random House on 8 July 2021.

== Critical reception ==
Critics gave Rajesh Khanna a positive reception.^{:vi–vii} Writing for The Hindu, Vijay Lokapally said the book was "written in a racy style" and called it "a fine tribute" to Khanna. Bollywood Hungama wrote, "Yasser Usman succeeds quite well in establishing the connect between the superstar and readers. So right from his personal relationships to his professional rivalries ... all narrated in very good detail, something that keeps you turning over the pages at a vigorous pace".^{:vi} Gautam Chintamani of India Today said the book "packs a punch while constructing the story of the biggest star of Hindi cinema and the best is reserved for the portions that describe his relationships". Advaita Kala from the Deccan Chronicle called it "a special book", calling the writing "cinematic and reads like a film script", and said the book is "one of the best read of 2014". A review carried by the Financial Chronicle noted the book's "brilliantly-woven narrative", adding, "Yasser Usman certainty has a knack for ensnaring the unsuspecting reader".^{:vi}

Bhupesh Bhandari of Business Standard described it as a "delightful new book" by Usman that "brings to light the various facets of the actor's extraordinary life". The New Indian Express said the book "is a collation of information that is part filmlore, part of cautionary tale with occasional pieces of rare trivia".^{:vi} Dawn's Asif Noorani noted the author had written "a real-page turner", further saying "the book reads like a novel, such is the writer’s narrative skill. But more importantly, it is rich in content." Mamun M. Adil from the same publication called the book; " ... a potboiler of sorts", and said; "[t]he narrative is brisk, the facts substantiated by many leading journalists and actors who worked with Khanna, all of which come together to create an insight into Khanna’s life, yet with plenty of mystique". The BBC praised it for "carefully woven between the fame of the superstar Rajesh Khanna and the conflict between his shy, egoistic [and] skeptical persona". Open magazine said Usman "understand[s] the mechanics of narrative" and Firstpost called Usman's writing "crisp" and "well-paced".^{:vi–vii}

== Adaptations ==
In 2022, the filmmakers Khushboo Sinnha and Samir Karnik announced a biopic based on the book, whose rights the duo acquired in July the previous year. The film's cast and crew will be finalised in 2022. Although another book on Khanna, Dark Star: The Loneliness of Being Rajesh Khanna (2014) by Gautam Chintamani, is also being adapted at the same time, Karnik stated; "It's not heartbreaking ... We all have stories to tell and ways to tell them, and to tell you the truth, every filmmaker is entitled to their own interpretation. We know what we have as a script, we know how much effort we have put in and we are confident and so is our studio that this film will succeed in showcasing the story of the superstar."

== Publication history ==
Region	Release date	Format	Ref.
India	5 December 2014	Amazon Kindle	
India	13 December 2014	Paperback	
India	1 May 2018	Paperback	
India	8 July 2021	Audiobook	
