= Vijay Lokapally =

Indian sport journalist and author

Vijay Lokapally is an Indian sport journalist and author. He started his career when he joined the Patriot newspaper in 1981, and later moved to The Hindu Group (writing for its publication The Hindu and Sportstar) from 1986. He is based in Delhi and married to Sunanda, with whom he has a son, Akshay.

== Career ==
Lokapally joined the newspaper Patriot in 1981, with his first article about the cricketer Bishan Singh Bedi. Bedi was impressed with the work, and Lokapally quoted this as a motivation to work as a cricket journalist. He resigned from Patriot in 1986 and later joined The Hindu Group (writing for its publication The Hindu and Sportstar), specializing in sports. He said that he felt "fortunate" to work with the company. He said, "My interest in writing came because of my passion to play and watch sports. And what better in life than to get paid for pursuing my hobby? The Hindu gave me assignments in India as well as overseas and it was wonderful to write about cricket from distant venues of the world." A Delhi-based journalist, he married Sunanda, with whom he has a son named Akshay. According to ThePrint, Lokapally has been considered in the media as one of India's most respected writers on cricket, and according to Sportskeeda, he is regarded as one of the most well-known sport journalist of India.

He has written five books related to cricket in India. The first is The Virender Sehwag Story, chronicling the life of the former cricketer Virender Sehwag, which was published by UBS Publishers' Distributors on 3 May 2004. In an interview to Yahoo! Cricket, he admitted that he was happy with his collaboration with the company as it has given him "confidence to look at more opportunities". He subsequently wrote Driven: The Virat Kohli Story, released by India's Bloomsbury Publishing on 1 October 2016. In a review carried by Daily News and Analysis, the critic G. Krishnan said that the book was written in "a simple manner with interviews from those who have seen Kohli closely from his younger days" and Vedam Jaishankar from Firstpost called it "memorable". His next two books are World Cup Warriors: The Boys in Blue (2019) and Speed Merchants: The Story of Indian Pace Bowling 1886 to 2019 (2020). Lokapally co-wrote the cricketer Rohit Sharma's biographical book The Hitman: The Rohit Sharma Story in 2020 as well.

== Bibliography ==
- Lokapally, Vijay (3 May 2004). The Virender Sehwag Story. UBS Publishers' Distributors. ISBN 978-81-74765-01-7.
- Lokapally, Vijay (1 October 2016). Driven: The Virat Kohli Story. Bloomsbury Publishing. ISBN 978-93-85936-26-5.
- Lokapally, Vijay (24 June 2019). World Cup Warriors: The Boys in Blue. Bloomsbury Publishing. ISBN 978-93-89165-23-4.
- Lokapally, Vijay; Ezekiel, Gulu (20 November 2020). Speed Merchants: The Story of Indian Pace Bowling 1886 to 2019. Bloomsbury Publishing. ISBN 978-93-88271-34-9.
- Lokapally, Vijay; Krishan, G. (25 November 2020). The Hitman: The Rohit Sharma Story. Bloomsbury Publishing. ISBN 978-93-900771-4-4.
