= Asian Voice =

Newspaper

Asian Voice, 30 January 2016.

Asian Voice is a weekly newspaper targeted at the British Asian community. The paper originated as New Life in 1977, and was a pull-out section of its sister publication Gujarat Samachar before it was published as an independent publication.

The paper and its sister publication Gujarat Samachar are distributed in print and online and they claim to distribute around 25,000 copies weekly. The publisher is Asian Business Publications Ltd.

The group host the Asian Voice Charity Awards powered by Charity Clarity and Asian Voice Political & Public Life Awards. These are supported by prominent members of the Asian community such as entrepreneur Manoj Nair and leading brands such as Edwardian Hotels, EY and the Funding Network. It's flagship Asian Achievers Awards event is now managed by global advisory firm EPG Economic and Strategy Consulting since 2021. The publication also produces a number of theme based magazine supplements including Asian House and Homes, Asian Giants, Legal Matters, Global India Rich List and Healthcare (www.abplgroup.com).
