= Waheeda Rehman filmography =

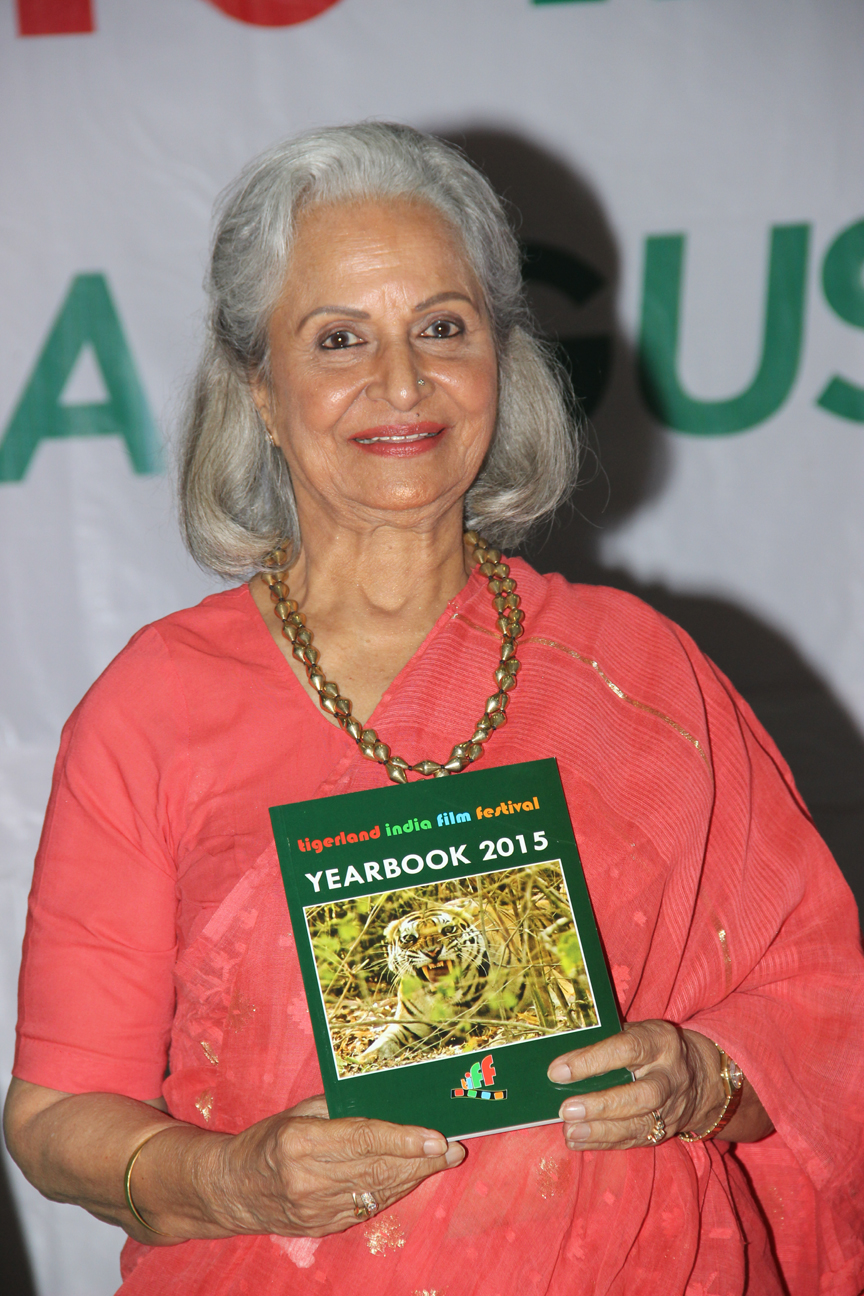
Waheeda Rehman in 2015

Indian actress Waheeda Rahman had her film debut in the Telugu film Rojulu Marayi (1955), she received recognition for her work in Hindi films directed by Guru Dutt, which included Pyaasa (1957), Kaagaz Ke Phool (1959), Chaudhvin Ka Chand (1960) and Sahib Bibi Aur Ghulam (1962), for which she received her first Filmfare nomination. She continued acting in the mid-1960s, starring in successful movies and establishing herself as one of the leading ladies in classic Indian cinema. Rehman's career reached its highest point when she won the Filmfare Award for Best Actress twice, for the Bollywood classic Guide (1965) and the romantic thriller Neel Kamal (1968) and received nominations for Ram Aur Shyam (1967) and Khamoshi (1969), the latter of which is considered to be her greatest performance ever.

She won the National Film Award for Best Actress for portraying a clanswoman in love with a separate clansman in the commercial failure Reshma Aur Shera (1971). Soon after she started to portray motherly and/or supporting roles in films. Rehman's further notable performances are Kabhi Kabhie (1976), Namkeen (1982), Chandni (1989) and Lamhe (1991), and the latter film became her last film credit in the next 11 years until 2002, where she returned to the film industry.

== Films ==
Year	Title	Role(s)	Language	Notes
1955	Rojulu Marayi	Dancer	Telugu	In the song "Eruvaaka Sagaroranno Chinnanna"
1955	Jayasimha	Princess	Telugu	
1955	Kaalam Maari Pochu	Dancer	Tamil	In the song "Yeru Thooki Povayae"
1956	Alibabavum 40 Thirudargalum	Lead dancer	Tamil	In the song "Salaam Babu Enaai"
1956	C.I.D.	Kamini	Hindi	
1957	Pyaasa	Gulabo	Hindi	
1958	12 O'Clock	Bani Chaudhary	Hindi	
1958	Solva Saal	Laaj	Hindi	
1959	Kaagaz Ke Phool	Shanti	Hindi	
1960	Kala Bazar	Alka	Hindi	
1960	Ek Phool Char Kaante	Sushma	Hindi	
1960	Chaudhvin Ka Chand	Jameela	Hindi	
1960	Girl Friend		Hindi	
1961	Roop Ki Rani Choron Ka Raja	Rani	Hindi	
1962	Sahib Bibi Aur Ghulam	Jaba	Hindi	Nominated – Filmfare Award for Best Supporting Actress
1962	Baat Ek Raat Ki	Neela / Meena	Hindi	
1962	Bees Saal Baad	Radha	Hindi	Highest-grossing Hindi film of 1962
1962	Rakhi	Radha	Hindi	
1962	Abhijan	Gulabi	Bengali	
1963	Mujhe Jeene Do	Chameli Bai	Hindi	
1963	Kaun Apna Kaun Paraya	Asha	Hindi	
1963	Ek Dil Sau Afsane	Suneeta	Hindi	
1964	Kohraa	Rajeshwari	Hindi	
1964	Shagoon	Geeta	Hindi	
1964	Majboor	Susheela Mehta	Hindi	
1965	Guide	Rosy / Nalini	Hindi	Filmfare Award for Best Actress
1966	Teesri Kasam	Heera Bai	Hindi	
1966	Dil Diya Dard Liya	Roopa	Hindi	
1967	Patthar Ke Sanam	Taruna	Hindi	
1967	Ram Aur Shyam	Anjana	Hindi	Nominated – Filmfare Award for Best Actress
1967	Palki	Mehroo	Hindi	
1968	Neel Kamal	Rajkumari Neel Kamal/ Seeta	Hindi	Filmfare Award for Best Actress
1968	Aadmi	Meena	Hindi	
1968	Baazi	Elizabeth D'Silva	Hindi	
1969	Khamoshi	Radha	Hindi	Nominated – Filmfare Award for Best Actress
1969	Shatranj	Meena	Hindi	
1969	Meri Bhabhi	Maya	Hindi	
1970	Prem Pujari	Suman Mehra	Hindi	
1970	Man Ki Aankhen	Geeta	Hindi	
1970	Dharti	Jwala/Princess Chitralekha	Hindi	
1970	Darpan	Madhavi	Hindi	
1971	Man Mandir	Krishna / Radha	Hindi	Double Role
1971	Reshma Aur Shera	Reshma	Hindi	National Film Award for Best Actress
1972	Zindagi Zindagi	Meeta Sharma	Hindi	
1972	Trisandhya	Indu	Hindi	
1972	Subah-O-Sham	Shirin	Hindi	
1972	Dil Ka Raaja	Laxmi Singh	Hindi	
1972	Thrisandhya		Malayalam	
1973	Phagun	Shanta	Hindi	
1973	Insaaf		Hindi	
1974	Bangaaru Kalalu	Saroja	Telugu	
1976	Kabhi Kabhie	Anjali Malhotra	Hindi	Nominated – Filmfare Award for Best Supporting Actress
1977	Adalat	Radha	Hindi	
1978	Trishul	Shanti	Hindi	Cameo
1979	Aaj Ki Dhara		Hindi	
1979	Jiban Jerakam		Bengali	
1980	Jyoti Bane Jwala	Malti	Hindi	
1980	Jwalamukhi	Savita	Hindi	
1982	Sawaal	Anju Mehta	Hindi	
1982	Namkeen	Jugni / Jyoti	Hindi	Nominated – Filmfare Award for Best Supporting Actress
1982	Namak Halaal	Savitri	Hindi	
1982	Dharam Kanta	Radha Singh	Hindi	
1983	Himmatwala	Savitri	Hindi	
1983	Mahaan	Janki	Hindi	
1983	Coolie	Salma	Hindi	
1983	Pyaasi Aankhen		Hindi	
1983	Ghungroo	Rani Maa	Hindi	
1984	Sunny	Gayatri	Hindi	
1984	Mashaal	Sudha	Hindi	
1984	Maqsad	Sharda	Hindi	
1985	Bayen Hath Ka Khel		Hindi	Unreleased film
1986	Simhasanam		Telugu	
1986	Singhasan	Raj Maata Vardhan	Hindi	
1986	Allah-Rakha	Advocate Salma	Hindi	
1989	Chandni	Lata Khanna	Hindi	Nominated – Filmfare Award for Best Supporting Actress
1991	Lamhe	Dai Jaan	Hindi	Nominated – Filmfare Award for Best Supporting Actress
1991	Swayam		Hindi	
1994	Ulfat Ki Nayee Manzilen		Hindi	Delayed Release
2002	Om Jai Jagadish	Saraswati Batra	Hindi	
2005	Water	Bhagwati	Hindi	
2005	Maine Gandhi Ko Nahin Mara	Principal Khanna	Hindi	
2005	15 Park Avenue	Mrs. Mathur / Mrs. Gupta	English / Bengali	
2006	Rang De Basanti	Aishwarya Rathod	Hindi	
2006	Chukkallo Chandrudu	Padmavathi	Telugu	Cameo
2009	Delhi 6	Annapurna Mehra	Hindi	
2013	Love in Bombay	Preeti Mehra	Hindi	Delayed Release
2015	Arshinagar	Dadijaan	Bengali	
2017	The Song of Scorpions	Zubeidaa	Hindi	
2018	Vishwaroopam II	Kashmiri's mother	Tamil / Hindi	
2021	Skater Girl	Maharani	English / Hindi	
