= O Nodi Re =

1959 song by Hemanta Mukherjee

Song by Hemanta Mukhopadhyay

from the album Neel Akasher Niche
- Language: Bengali
- English title: O, River
- Released: February 20, 1959
- Length: 3:24
- Label: Saregama
- Composer: Hemanta Mukhopadhyay
- Lyricist: Gauriprasanna Mazumdar
- Producer: Hemanta Mukhopadhyay

Lyrical video
- "O Nadire, Ekti Katha" on YouTube

"O Nodi Re, Ekti Katha" is a Bengali-language song by Indian playback singer Hemanta Mukhopadhyay (Mukherjee), with lyrics by Gauriprasanna Mazumdar and music by Mukherjee. As a track from the film Neel Akasher Niche directed by Mrinal Sen, it was released on February 20, 1959. The songs of the film are considered among the best works of Hemanta. Many music amateurs and singers who were not adjusted with Bengali had requested a translation of the song to understand the lyrics.

With its theme centered on river, a cover version of the song was released by folk singer Bikramjit Baulia to celebrate the birth centennial of its singer Hemanta Mukherjee. The song was remade in Hindi as "O Beqarar Dil" sung by Lata Mangeshkar in Kohra.

Full song from Neel Akasher Niche.

== Cover version ==
On Hemanta Mukherjee's birth centennial on June 16, 2019, Bikramjit Baulia, a folk singer made a cover version of "O Nodi Re" which he sang as a tribute to Mukherjee. He sang the song remembering his various compositions and songs which are loved by all listeners of all groups and ages. Baulia released the song on the same day, stating that "O Nodi Re" was a famous song sung originally by Mukherjee. He released the song on his official YouTube channel. Nirupam Barbhuiya and Ranabir Singh made a rearrangement the song for Baulia to sing in the cover version. The music video's cinematography was done by Abhishek Roy and it was edited by Arindam Goala of Mix and Match Production. Regarding the song, Baulia said that he appeals to all music listeners to listen to the two songs he had sung. He further spoke that he sang the songs in his own way with his best effort to try and preserve and original compositional elements.

== Hindi remake ==
The Hindi film Kohra was an adaption of the 1938 novel Rebecca by Daphne du Maurier. It was directed by Biren Nag and featured Biswajit Chatterjee and Waheeda Rehman. Hemanta Mukherjee's music for the film played a role in representing its theme. The song "O Beqarar Dil" sung by Lata Mangeshkar and written by Kaifi Azmi with music by Mukherjee is the Hindi remake of "O Nodi Re".
