= Kahin Deep Jale Kahin Dil =

Song by Lata Mangeshkar
- Released: 1962
- Composer: Hemanta Mukherjee
- Lyricist: Shakeel Badayuni

Kahin Deep Jale Kahin Dil is an Indian song from the Bollywood film Bees Saal Baad (1962), starring Waheeda Rehman and Biswajit. The lyrics of the song were written by Shakeel Badayuni, the music was composed by Hemanta Mukherjee and Lata Mangeshkar was the playback singer. In 1963, Badayuni received the Filmfare Award for Best Lyricist and Lata Mangeshkar received the Filmfare Award for Best Female Playback Singer for this song. This was Mangeshkar's second Filmfare award.

Song is also remembered as the one which brought Lata Mangeshkar back, who was suffering from defect in vocal cord. Many musicians and producers thought it was end of her career. She was brought to sing this song and she could not get hold of it. After three failed attempts she told Hemant Kumar to pick any other singer. But he was adamant and encouraged her to try again later. She came back a few days later and rendered the song in a way which made it a classic.

== Awards ==
Bees Saal Baad was a horror film. The Filmfare critics noted: "Appropriate background music and hauntingly melodious songs, particularly, "Kahin Deep Jale" number, further enhance the appeal of Bees Saal Baad."

Year	Awards	Category	Recipient
1963	Filmfare Award	Best lyrics	Shakeel Badayuni
1963	Filmfare Award	Best female playback singer	Lata Mangeshkar
