= Neel Akasher Neechey =

- Screenshot
- Directed by: Mrinal Sen
- Based on: Chini Feriwala by Mahadevi Varma
- Produced by: Hemanta Bela Production
- Starring: Kali Banerjee; Manju Dey; Bikash Roy; Smriti Biswas; Suruchi Sengupta; Ajit Chatterjee; Rasaraj Chakraborty; Monu Mukherjee
- Cinematography: Sailaja Chatterjee
- Music by: Hemanta Mukherjee
- Production company: New Theatres
- Release date: 20 February 1959
- Running time: 133 minutes
- Country: India
- Language: Bengali

Neel Akasher Neechey ( "Under the Blue Sky") is a 1959 Bengali language drama film directed by Mrinal Sen and produced by Hemanta Mukherjee, starring Kali Bannerjee, Manju Dey, Bikash Roy in lead roles. The film was based on the Mahadevi Verma short story Chini Feriwala.

Set in the background of the last days of the British Raj in Calcutta, the film explores the lives of a number of characters, including the platonic relationship between an immigrant Chinese wage worker, Wang Lu, and the main female character Basanti. The film had overt political overtones and was the first film in independent India to be banned by the Government of India. The ban was effective for two months.

== Plot ==
Set in the 1930s, the film tells the story of an honest Chinese hawker, Wang Lu, who sells silk in Calcutta's streets while refusing to get involved in the opium trade run by his fellow countrymen. He feels a sisterly affection towards Basanti, the wife of a lawyer who is engaged in a nationalist political group. Basanti is arrested and imprisoned causing Wang Lu to get involved with her political group. He later returns to China to join the resistance movement against the Japanese invasion of China in 1931.

== Cast ==
- Kali Bannerjee as Wang Lu
- Manju Dey as Basanti
- Bikash Roy as Basanti's husband
- Smriti Biswas as Maki
- Suruchi Sengupta
- Ajit Chatterjee
- Rasaraj Chakraborty
- Mei-Lin Jiang as Mei-Lin in special appearance

== Soundtrack ==
All lyrics are written by Gauriprasanna Mazumder; all music is composed by Hemanta Mukherjee.

Songs
No.	Title	Playback	Length
1.	"O Nodi Re"	Hemanta Mukherjee	4:13
2.	"Neel Akasher Neechey Ei Prithibi"	Hemanta Mukherjee	3:48
