= Anindita =

Anindita is a given name. Notable people with the name include:

- Anindita Bose (born 1986), Bengali actress
- Anindita Ghosh, British historian
- Anindita Nayar (born 1988), Indian actress
- Anindita Paul (born 1975), Indian singer
- Anindita Raychaudhury, Bengali actress
