= Bela Mukherjee =

Indian singer (1920–2009)

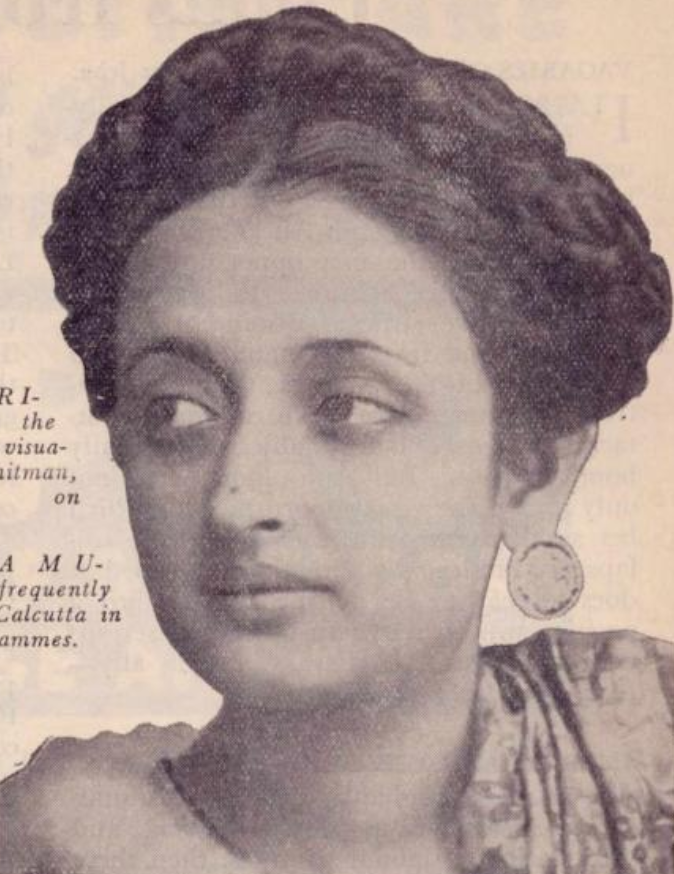
- Bela Mukherjee, from a 1940 issue of The Indian Listener
- Born: 29 May 1920; Murshidabad, West Bengal, British India
- Died: 25 June 2009 (aged 89); Kolkata, West Bengal, India
- Occupation: Singer
- Spouse: Hemanta Mukherjee (m. 1945)
- Children: Jayant Mukherjee (son); Ranu Mukherjee (daughter)
- Relatives: Moushumi Chatterjee (daughter-in-law)

Bela Mukherjee (29 May 1920 – 25 June 2009) was an Indian singer and the wife of singer and music director Hemanta Mukherjee. She recorded a number of songs with her husband.

Mukherjee died in a private hospital in South Kolkata on 25 June 2009, aged 89. She had been admitted to the hospital on 15 June 2009. She was cremated at Keoratala.
