= Dino Martelli =

Indian entrepreneur

- Born: Deepak Malhotra; 1964 (age 61–62); Bangalore, India
- Other name: Dino Malhotra Martelli
- Occupations: Model, actor, entrepreneur
- Years active: 1980s–present

Dino Martelli, previously known as Deepak Malhotra (born 1964), is a former Indian model and actor, who now runs an apparel company.

== Early life ==
Deepak lived in Bangalore, where he studied in Christ University from 1982 to 1985.

He was a member of Bangalore Club, and was also a national-level gymnast.

== Career ==
=== Modelling ===
One of the earliest finds of Design and Print Group, Malhotra began his career modelling for a menswear line in Bangalore, and soon became one of the most sought after models during the late 1980s and the early 1990s.

He was the face of Vimal, a major textile brand of Reliance Industries, for many years; and reportedly had a contract of ₹150,000 in 1987, which was unprecedented at that time. He gained further popularity with his TV advertisement for Aramusk, a soap that was promoted as being for the "extravagantly male". He also appeared in advertisements for Kwality and Garware Video Cassette.

=== Acting ===
Deepak Malhotra and Sridevi in the poster of Lamhe (1991)

After his success as a model, he started getting movie offers, and moved to Mumbai. In 1991, he made his film debut with Yash Chopra's Lamhe, starring alongside Sridevi and Anil Kapoor. The film did poorly at the box office and Martelli received backlash for his role, particularly for a single scene. Martelli was also cast for the 1993 film Darr, but he was replaced by Sunny Deol due to the backlash he received for his performance in Lamhe. He got his second and last film role in the 1994 action film Tejasvini, where he appeared opposite Vijayshanti. By 1994 he had stopped receiving offers as an actor and moved to the United States to continue his modeling career.

=== Entrepreneurship ===
Malhotra moved to New York City and changed his name to Dino Martelli. There he studied industrial engineering and designing, and started working in the field of apparels. He is currently the principal at NYC Made Apparel, which he co-founded in 2018.

In 2003, he opened Café Sesso in The Courtyard in Colaba, Mumbai with his friend and business partner, socialite Sabina Chopra. It shut down over a year later, and they took up the management of the restaurant at Breach Candy's Moksh gym and leisure club, naming it Spring.

== Filmography ==
Dino Martelli / Deepak Malhotra
Year	Film	Role	Notes
1991	Lamhe	Lead actor	Debut film; starred opposite Sridevi and Anil Kapoor
1994	Tejasvini	Lead actor	Final film role; starred opposite Vijayshanti

== Personal life ==
In 1998, Dino married model-turned-fashion choreographer Lubna Adam, who is notable for opening India's first fashion model training school 'Catwalk' in Bombay in 1990. They were in a relationship for 11 years before their marriage, and after getting married moved to New York where they lived in Upper West Side.

They have two sons— Kian Martelli, who was a decorated athlete in Riverhead High School, and is a designated partner in Lubna Adams Luxury Lifestyle Llp; and Kyle Martelli, salutatorian of Riverhead High's graduating Class of 2021, who is currently a student at Boston University Questrom School of Business. The Martelli brothers have also modelled for Manish Malhotra's fashion collection.

The couple have separated; and in 2014, Dino married Erika Falconeri.
