= Biren Nag =

Indian film director and art director

- Born: 1922; Mymensingh, India
- Died: 1964 (aged 41–42); Kolkata, India
- Occupation(s): Film director, Art director

Biren Nag (1922–1964) was an acclaimed Indian film director and art director in Hindi cinema. Prior to taking up direction himself, he served as Art Director for four of the most beautiful films shot in Mumbai in the late 1950s and early 1960s: Pyaasa (1957) Kala Pani (1958) Chaudhvin Ka Chand (1960); and Sahib Bibi Aur Ghulam (1962). He won a 1960 Filmfare Award for Best Art Direction for his work on Chaudhvin Ka Chand (1960).

In 1962 he directed his first film, Bees Saal Baad a noirish ghost story also starring Waheeda Rehman and Biswajeet, which garnered him a Filmfare Best Director Award nomination in 1963. The film was the top grosser at the box office in 1962, a super hit doing gross business worth Rs. 3, 00, 00,000 and net business worth Rs. 1, 50, 00,000. He also directed Kohraa in 1964, repeating the lead pair of his debut. However, he died soon after the film was released.

== Filmography ==
Film(as director)	Year of release	Other notes
Kohraa	1964	Retelling of Du Maurier's novel and later Hitchcock's film Rebecca
Bees Saal Baad	1962	Nominated-Filmfare Best Director Award. In the film, the opening credits show his name as Biren Naug.

(Both the films were produced by Hemanta Mukherjee. He was also the music director and the lead playback singer in both of them)

Film(as art director)	Year of release	Other notes
Tere Ghar Ke Samne	1963	As Biren Naug
Hum Dono	1962	As Biren Naug
Sahib Bibi Aur Ghulam	1962	As Biren Naug
Chaudhvin Ka Chand	1961	As Biren Naug; Won - Filmfare Award for Best Art Direction
Aakhri Dao	1958	-
Detective	1958	As Biren Naug
Life Sentence	1958	As Biren Naug
Talaaq	1958	As Biren Naug
Pyaasa	1957	As Biren Naug
Nau Do Gyarah	1957	As Biren Naug
Basant Bahar	1956	As Biren Naug
C.I.D.	1956	As Biren Naug
Mem Sahib	1956	As Biren Naug
'42	1951	-
