= Jwalamukhi (1980 film) =

- Directed by: Prakash Mehra
- Written by: Kader Khan; Suraj Sanim
- Produced by: Babboo Mehra
- Starring: Waheeda Rehman; Shatrughan Sinha; Reena Roy; Shabana Azmi; Vinod Mehra
- Music by: Kalyanji-Anandji
- Release date: 26 December 1980
- Running time: 162 minutes
- Country: India
- Language: Hindi

Jwalamukhi (transl. Volcano) is a 1980 Hindi movie produced by Babboo Mehra and directed by Prakash Mehra. The film stars Waheeda Rehman, Shatrughan Sinha, Reena Roy, Shabana Azmi, Vinod Mehra, Amjad Khan, Kader Khan, Pran, and Bindu.

== Production ==
The film, which told the same story as the 1978 Telugu film Katakataala Rudraiah, was produced around the same time as the similar, and ultimately much more successful, film Jyoti Bane Jwala.

== Plot ==
Savita (Waheeda Rehman) and Inspector Rakesh (Raj Babbar) are in love and are getting married. But on the wedding day, Savita finds him murdered, and the blame was put on the dacoit Shersingh (Amjad Khan). She gives birth to a son, Rajesh (Shatrughan Sinha), whom her aunt has thrown away, and she is told he died at birth. Rajesh is found and raised by Mr. Rai (Pran), who is blackmailed into illegal smuggling by his friend P.D. (Kader Khan). Savita Devi marries, has a son Vikram (Vinod Mehra) who grows up with Rajesh as his best friend. She becomes a notable spokesperson for orphans. One day she encounters P.D., and realizes that he is the one who killed Inspector Rakesh. She then finds out that Rajesh is her first son, his true love is Anju (Reena Roy), the daughter of the evil P.D. With the help of Shersingh, she protects both her sons and keep the secrets of a past life.

== Cast ==
- Waheeda Rehman as Savita
- Shatrughan Sinha as Rajesh
- Vinod Mehra as Vikram
- Shabana Azmi as Kiran Saxena
- Reena Roy as Anju
- Raj Babbar as Inspector Rakesh (Special Appearance)
- Amjad Khan as Sher Singh (Guest Appearance)
- Kader Khan as P.D. , The main antagonist.
- Pran as Mr. Rai
- Shreeram Lagoo as Anand
- Bindu as Kamini
- Aruna Irani as Sheela Rai (Special Appearance)
- Mumtaz Begum (actress) as Bua Pushpa
- Shivraj as Savita's Father
- Ram Sethi as Chamanlal Pabra
- Yunus Parvez as Colonel Saxena
- Vikas Anand as Kaka, Sher Singh,s uncle
- Goga Kapoor as Randhir, PD,s henchman

== Soundtrack ==
The music of the film was composed by Kalyanji–Anandji, while lyrics were written by Anjaan.

Song	Singer
Humko To Nasha Hai Mohabbat Ka Janaab	Kishore Kumar, Shatrughan Sinha
Yeh Chehre Pe Chehra Lagaaogi Kab Tak	Kishore Kumar
Hum Tere Bina Bhi Nahin Ji Sakte, Aur Tere Bina Bhi Nahin Ji Sakte	Asha Bhosle, Kishore Kumar, Mahendra Kapoor, Hemlata
Kabhi Tumne Kisi Ko Phaansa, Kabhi Humne Kisi Ko Phaansa	Asha Bhosle, Kishore Kumar
