= RangDe =

P2P online micro-financing platform

Rang De
- Industry: Personal finance
- Founded: 2008
- Founders: Smita Ramakrishna, Ramakrishna NK
- Headquarters: Bengaluru, India
- Key people: Smita Ramakrishna, Ramakrishna NK
- Products: Peer-to-peer lending
- Website: rangde.in

Rang De is India's first peer-to-peer online micro-lending platform founded in 2008. It is based in Bengaluru, India.

== History ==
Smita Ramakrishna and Ramakrishna NK founded Rang De in 2008 as a not-for-profit organisation to serve the credit needs of the under-served communities and low income households. It connects individual social investors to a community of curated entrepreneurs and students from low-income households across the country, enabling them to invest in the livelihoods and education needs of this community.

In 2013, Rang De opened the platform for foreign social investors. In 2015, Rang De collaborated with OnePlus for the Joy of Giving Week. Rang De is supported by ICICI Foundation, CSO Partners, Center for Bharatiya Management Development, Association for Sustainable Community Development, and Tata Trusts. Over 93% of the borrowers are women. Rang De works with around 16 field partners across the country.

On 8 March 2017, at the Yeswanthpur village in Kolar district, the Swabhimaan initiative was launched to impart financial literacy to village women, give customised credit, and enable them to make informed financial decisions. Self serviced kiosks called Bioscope are created to impart financial education. Bank accounts created under the Pradhan Mantri Jan Dhan Yojana, eKYC, Aadhaar, and Unified Payment Interface (UPI) is used to disburse credit.

== Concept ==
Rang De connect social investors with under-served communities of borrowers, enabling the low income households to get financial help. Social investors can begin by lending as low as INR 100 through the Rang De platform. It partners with non-governmental organisations and micro-lending institutions to screen borrowers at the grassroots level. The platform keeps track of disbursements and returns, which the investor can withdraw or reinvest.

== Recognition ==
- 2011 - Manthan South Asia Award
- 2012 - Ashoka Fellowship
- 2013 - Bangalore Heroes Award
- 2013 - Millennium Alliance Award
- 2014 - Bihar Innovation Forum Award

The Development Marketplace (DM) of the World Bank supports Rang De.
