= Hemant Kumar =

Indian singer and music director (1920–1989)

Hemanta Mukhopadhyay
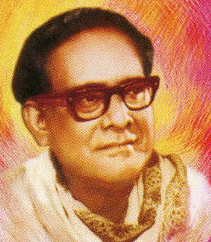

Background information
- Born: Hemanta Mukhopadhyay; 16 June 1920; Benares, Benares State, British India
- Died: 26 September 1989 (aged 69) Calcutta, West Bengal, India
- Genres: Indian classical music; filmi; playback singing; Bengali classical music
- Occupations: Singer, music director, producer
- Instrument: Harmonium
- Years active: 1935–1989
- Spouse: Bela Mukherjee (m. 1945)

Ei raat tomar amar - Bengali movie song from Deep Jwele Jai (1959) (This night is yours and mine)
Lyricist Gauriprasanna Mazumder, composer and singer Hemanta Mukhopadhyay

Hemanta Mukhopadhyay (Note: Bengali pronunciation: [hemont̪o mukʰopad̪ʱːae̯].) (Bengali pronunciation: [hemont̪o mukʰopad̪ʱːae̯]; 16 June 1920 – 26 September 1989), known professionally as Hemanta Mukherjee and Hemant Kumar, (Note: Hindustani pronunciation: [ɦeːmənt̪ kʊmɑːɾ].) was an Indian music director and a playback singer who primarily sang in Bengali and Hindi, along with several other Indian languages, including Marathi, Gujarati, Odia, Assamese, Tamil, Punjabi, Bhojpuri, Konkani, Sanskrit and Urdu. He was an artist in Bengali and Hindi film music, Rabindra Sangeet, and various other genres. He was the recipient of two National Awards for Best Male Playback Singer and was popularly known as the "Voice of God".

== Early life and education ==
Hemanta was born in Varanasi, Uttar Pradesh, at the residence of his maternal grandfather, who served as a physician. His paternal family originated from Jaynagar Majilpur and had migrated to Kolkata in the early 1900s. Growing up in Kolkata, he received his early education at Nasiruddin School before transferring to Mitra Institution School in Bhowanipore. During his school years, he formed lasting friendships with Subhash Mukhopadhyay, who would later become a celebrated poet, and writer Santosh Kumar Ghosh.

Hemanta enrolled in the Bengal Technical Institute at Jadavpur (now Jadavpur University) to pursue an engineering diploma. However, he left academics due to health issues and to pursue a career in music, despite his father's disapproval. He briefly experimented with literature and published a short story in the Bengali magazine Desh, but by the late 1930s, he had decided to dedicate himself entirely to music.

== Early career ==
Hemanta's debut as a playback singer came in 1940 with the Bengali film Rajkumarer Nirbbasan, where he sang under the musical direction of S.D. Burman. This was followed by Nimai Sanyas (1941), scored by Hariprasanna Das. In 1943, he composed his first original songs, "Katha Kayonako Shudhu Shono" and "Amar Biraha Akashe Priya", with lyrics by Amiya Bagchi. His entry into Hindi cinema occurred in 1942 with the film Meenakshi, followed by Irada (1944), under composer Amar Nath's direction.

Hemanta established himself as a prominent exponent of Rabindra Sangeet with his first recorded piece in the genre appearing in the Bengali film Priya Bandhabi (1944). The song "Pather Sesh Kothaye" marked the beginning of his journey with Tagore's compositions. That same year, he recorded his first non-film Rabindra Sangeet album under the Columbia label, featuring "Aamar Aar Habe Na Deri" and "Keno Pantha E Chanchalata". An earlier recording of "Aamaar mallikabone" for All India Radio/Akashvani has been lost to time. His directorial debut as a music director came with the Bengali film Abhiyatri in 1947. During this period, he worked alongside contemporary male vocalists including Jaganmay Mitra, Robin Majumdar, Satya Chowdhury, Dhananjay Bhattacharya, Sudhirlal Chakraborty, Bechu Dutta and Talat Mahmood. While his early recordings garnered critical acclaim, major commercial success eluded him until 1947.

== Emergence as a national artist ==
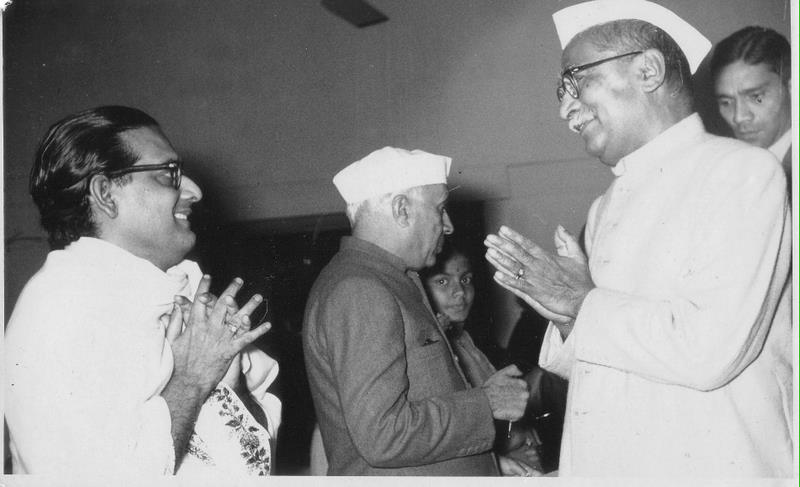
Hemanta Mukherjee (left) with Rajendra Prasad and Jawaharlal Nehru, 1950

In the mid-1940s, Hemanta became actively involved with the Indian People's Theatre Association (IPTA), where he formed a significant collaboration with fellow member and composer Salil Chowdhury. The devastating Bengal famine of 1943 and the inaction of both British authorities and wealthy Indians had been instrumental in IPTA's formation. His 1947 recording of "Gayer Badhu" ("The rural bride"), composed and written by Salil Chowdhury, marked a turning point in his career. This unconventional six-minute composition, recorded on both sides of a 78 rpm disc, departed from traditional Bengali song structure and romantic themes. Instead, it portrayed the tragic transformation of an idyllic rural life devastated by famine and poverty. The song's unprecedented success established Hemanta as a leading voice in eastern India, elevating him above his male contemporaries. This successful partnership with Salil Chowdhury continued through numerous popular collaborations in subsequent years.

During this period, Hemanta received increasing opportunities as a music composer for Bengali films, notably working with director Hemen Gupta. When Gupta relocated to Mumbai, he invited Hemanta to compose for his Hindi directorial debut Anandmath under the Filmistan banner. This led to Hemanta's migration to Mumbai in 1951, where he joined Filmistan Studios. He named his Mumbai residence in Khar after Rabindranath Tagore's Gitanjali. Anand Math (1952) achieved moderate success, with its standout contribution being Lata Mangeshkar's rendition of 'Vande mataram', which Hemanta set to a stirring martial tune. Following Anandamath, Hemanta composed for several Filmistan productions, including Shart, gaining modest popularity. Simultaneously, he established himself as a prominent playback singer in Mumbai. His collaborations with S. D. Burman for Bollywood actors produced numerous hits, like Dev Anand for (Yeh Raat Yeh Chandni Phir Kahan from Jaal, Chup Hai Dharti and Teri Duniya Mein Jeene Se from House No. 44, Hai Apna Dil To Awara from Solva Saal, and Na Tum Humen Jano from Baat Ek Raat Ki). Pradeep Kumar for (Nagin, Detective), Sunil Dutt for (Savle Salone Aaye Din from Ek Hi Rasta, O Neend Na Mujhko from Post Box 999, Ghumsum Sa Yeh Jahan from Duniya Jhukti Hain) and Biswajeet for (Bekarar Karke Hume from Bees Saal Baad, Ek Baar Zara Phir from Bin Badal Barsaat, Ye Nayan Dare Dare from Kohra) and Dharmendra for Anupama. He also served as the music composer for these films.

== Career rise ==
By the mid-1950s, Hemanta had consolidated his position as a prominent singer and composer. In Bengal, he was one of the foremost exponents of Rabindra Sangeet and perhaps the most sought-after male singer. In a ceremony organized by Hemanta Mukherjee to honor Debabrata Biswas (1911–1980), the legendary Rabindra Sangeet exponent, in Calcutta in March 1980, Debabrata Biswas unhesitatingly mentioned Hemanta as "the second hero" to popularise Rabindra Sangeet, the first being the legendary Pankaj Kumar Mullick. In Mumbai, along with playback singing, Hemanta carved a niche as a composer. He composed music for a Hindi film called Nagin (1954) which became a major success owing largely to its music. Songs of Nagin remained chart-toppers continuously for two years and culminated in Hemanta receiving the prestigious Filmfare Best Music Director Award in 1955. The very same year, he scored music for a Bengali movie Shap Mochan in which he played back four songs for the Bengali actor Uttam Kumar. This started a long partnership between Hemanta and Uttam as a playback singer-actor pair. They were the most popular singer-actor duo in Bengali cinema over the next decade.

In the latter part of the 1950s, Hemanta composed music and sang for several Bengali and Hindi films and recorded several Rabindra Sangeet and Bengali non-film songs. Almost all of these, especially his Bengali songs, became very popular. This period can be seen as the zenith of his career and lasted for almost a decade. Salil Chowdhury and Lata Mangeshkar stated Hemanta as the Voice Of God. He sang songs composed by the major music directors in Bengal such as Nachiketa Ghosh, Robin Chatterjee and Salil Chowdhury. Some of the notable films Hemanta himself composed music for during this period include Harano Sur, Marutirtha Hinglaj, Neel Akasher Neechey, Lukochuri, Swaralipi, Deep Jwele Jaai, Shesh Parjanta, Kuhak, Dui Bhai, and Saptapadi in Bengali, and Jagriti and Ek Hi Raasta in Hindi.

== Production ==
In the late 1950s, Hemanta ventured into movie production under his own banner: Hemanta-Bela Productions. The first movie under this banner was a Bengali film directed by Mrinal Sen, titled Neel Akasher Neechey (1959). The story was based on the travails of a Chinese street hawker in Calcutta in the backdrop of India's freedom struggle. The movie went on to win the President's Gold Medal — the highest honour for a movie from the Government of India. In the next decade, Hemanta's production company was renamed Geetanjali productions and it produced several Hindi movies such as Bees Saal Baad, Kohraa, Biwi Aur Makaan, Faraar, Rahgir and Khamoshi all of which had music by Hemanta. Only Bees Saal Baad and Khamoshi were major commercial successes.

Back in Bengal, Hemanta scored music for a movie titled Palatak in 1963 where he experimented with merging Bengal folk music and light music. This proved to be a major success and Hemanta's composition style changed noticeably for many of his future films in Bengal such as Baghini, and Balika Badhu. In Bengali films Manihar and Adwitiya, both of which were major musical as well as commercial successes, his compositions had a light classical tinge. In 1961, for commemorating Rabindranath Tagore's birth centenary, the Gramophone Company of India featured Rabindrasangeet by Hemanta in a large portion of its commemorative output. This too proved to be a major commercial success. Hemanta went on several overseas concert tours including his trip to the West Indies. Overall, in the 1960s decade, he retained his position as the major male singer in Bengal and as a composer and singer to be reckoned with in Hindi films.

In the 1960s he was the predominant and lead male voice in many of Tagore's musical dramas like Valmiki Pratibha, Shyama, Sapmochan, Chitrangada and Chandalika. With Kanika Bandopadhyay (1924–2000) and Suchitra Mitra (1924–2010), who were the lead female voices in these, he was part of the Rabindra Sangeet triumvirate that was popular and respected. It was referred to as 'Hemanta-Kanika-Suchitra' and, with Debabrata Biswas, this quartet was and continues to be the most heard exponents of Tagore compositions. Asoktaru Bandopadhyay, Chinmoy Chattopadhyay, Sagar Sen, Sumitra Sen, and Ritu Guha were the other leading exponents of Rabindra Sangeet at that time.

== Later career ==
In the 1970s, Hemanta's contribution to Hindi films was nominal. He scored music for a handful of his home productions, but none of these movies nor their music were successful. In Bengal, however, he remained the foremost exponent of Rabindra Sangeet, film and non-film songs. His output continued to be popular for most of the decade. Some of them are Jodi Jante Chao Tumi (1972), Ek Gochha Rajanigandha, Aamay Prasno Kore Nil Dhrubatara, Sedin Tomay Dekhechilam (1974), Khirki Theke Singho Duar (Stree, 1971), Ke Jane Ko Ghonta (Sonar Khancha, 1974), Jeona Daraon Bandhu (Phuleswari, 1975) and popularised Rabindra sangeet using them beautifully in films as per situations. A very popular and classic example is the song Chorono Dhorite Diyogo Amare in Dadar Kirti (1980). In 1971, Hemanta debuted as a film director in for his self-produced Bengali movie Anindita. It didn't fare exceedingly well at the box office. However, his rendition Diner Seshe Ghumer Deshe was one of his best and most popular Rabindra Sangeet renditions. In the same year, Hemanta went to Hollywood by responding to film director Conrad Rooks and score the music of Conrad's Siddhartha and played back O Nadire (composed and sung by him earlier in Neel Akasher Neechey (1959) in that film. He was the first Indian singer to playback in Hollywood. The US government honored Hemanta by conferring him with the citizenship of Baltimore, Maryland; the first-ever singer of India to get US citizenship. In the early to mid-1970s, two major music composers in Bengal, Nachiketa Ghosh and Robin Chatterjee, who had worked closely with Hemanta, since the early 1950s, died. Simultaneously, music composed by Hemanta for Bengali films like Phuleswari, Raag Anurag, Ganadebata and Dadar Kirti established him as the major film music composer in the Bengal movie scene. In 1979, Hemanta re-recorded some of his earlier works with composer Salil Chowdhury from the 1940s and 1950s. This album, titled Legend of Glory, vol. 2, was a major commercial success.

In 1980, Hemanta had a heart attack that severely affected his vocal capabilities, especially his breath control. He continued to record songs in the early eighties, but his voice was a shade of its rich baritone past. In 1984, Hemanta was felicitated by different organizations, most notably by the Gramophone Company of India, for completing 50 years in music. That very year Hemanta released his last album with Gramophone Company of India — a 45 rpm extended play disc with four non-film songs. Over the next few years, Hemanta released a few non-film songs for small-time companies that had cropped up in the nascent cassette-based music industry. Only a few of these were commercially successful. He composed music for a handful of Bengali movies and one Bengali and one Hindi tele-series. However, by this time he had become an institution, a beloved and revered personality who was a courteous and friendly gentleman. His philanthropic activities included running a homeopathic hospital in memory of his late father in their native village in Baharu, in the South 24 Parganas district of West Bengal. He continued to feature regularly on All India Radio, Doordarshan (TV), and live programs/concerts during this period.

In a television interview, recorded in the early 1990s, to noted elocutionist Gauri Ghosh, his wife Bela Mukherjee recalled that she never knew during his lifetime the number of families and persons he helped to put up financially or otherwise; it was only after his departure that this truth gradually unveiled.

In 1987, he was nominated for Padma Bhushan which he refused, having already turned down a previous offer to receive Padma Shri in the 1970s. In this year, he was publicly felicitated in Netaji Indoor Stadium in Calcutta for completing 50 years in the musical journey, where, Lata Mangeshkar presented him with the memento on behalf of his fans and admirers. Despite his aging voice, he became the Best Male Singer in 1988 for his rendition in the film "Lalan Fakir".

In September 1989 he traveled to Dhaka, Bangladesh to receive the Michael Madhusudan Award, as well as to perform a concert. Immediately after returning from this trip he suffered another heart attack on 26 September 1989 and died at 11:15 pm in a nursing home in South Calcutta.

== Personal life ==
Hemanta had three brothers and a sister Nilima. His younger brother Tarajyoti was a Bengali short story writer. His youngest brother Amal composed music as well as sang for some Bengali movies, most notably for Abak Prithibi and Hospital. Amal recorded a few songs in the 1960s as well with Hemant as music director, most notably the song "Jiboner Anekta Path Eklai". In 1945, Hemanta married Bela Mukherjee, a singer from Bengal. Although she had sung some popular songs in the movie Kashinath, she did not actively pursue her musical career after marriage. They had two children, a son Jayant, and a daughter Ranu. Ranu also pursued a music career in the late 1960s and early 1970s, with somewhat limited success. Jayant is married to Moushumi Chatterjee, a Bengali film actress.

== Awards ==
- 1956 : Filmfare Best Music Director Award: Nagin
- 1971 : National Film Award for Best Male Playback Singer: Nimantran
- 1962 : BFJA Best Music Director Award: "Swaralipi": Won
- 1963 : BFJA Best Music Director Award (Hindi): "Bees Saal Baad":Won
- 1964 : BFJA Best Music Director Award: "Palatak": Won
- 1967 : BFJA Best Music Director Award: "Monihar": Won
- 1968 : BFJA Best Music Director Award: "Balika Badhu":Won
- 1970 : Padma Shri (Refused)
- 1971 : The US government honored Hemanta by conferring him with the citizenship of Baltimore, Maryland.
- 1972 : BFJA Best Male Playback Singer Award: Dhannyee Meye: Won
- 1975 : BFJA Best Male Playback Singer Award: Phuleswari: Won
- 1975 : BFJA Best Music Director Award: "Phuleawari": Won
- 1976 : BFJA Best Male Playback Singer Award: Priya Bandhobi: Won
- 1986 : National Film Award for Best Male Playback Singer: Lalan Fakir
- 1986 : Sangeet Natak Akademi Award for Creative and experimental music.
- 1986 : BFJA Best Music Director Award: "Bhalobasa Bhalobasa": Won
- 1987 : Padma Bhushan (Refused)
- 1987 : BFJA Best Music Director Award: "Pathbhola": Won
- 1988 : BFJA Best Music Director Award: "Aagoman": Won
- 1985 : Honorary D.Litt. by Visva-Bharati University
- 1986 : Sangeet Natak Akademi Award
- 1988 : Honorary D.Litt. by The University of Calcutta
- 1989 : Michael Madhusudan Award
- 2012 : Bangladesh Liberation War Honour,
- 2012 : Friends of Liberation War Honour (Posthumously)

== Death and legacy ==
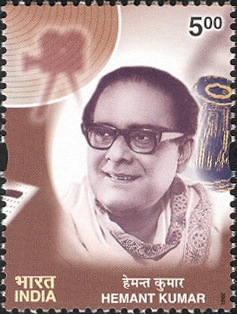
Indian stamp featuring Hemant Kumar (2003)

On 26 September 1989, Hemant fell ill after returning from a concert in Dhaka. He died shortly after, due to a massive cardiac arrest. According to his daughter-in-law Moushumi Chatterjee, his last words were "Ki koshto, ki koshto ('such pain, such pain')."

Hemant's legacy still lives on through the songs that he has recorded during his lifetime, as well as the music he has composed. Due to the commercial viability of his songs, the Gramophone Company of India (or Saregama) still releases at least one album of his every year, repackaging his older songs. The Kolkata Metro's Hemanta Mukhopadhyay metro station is named after him. A Mumbai square is also named after him as Hemant Kumar Square.

== Discography ==
=== English discography (as composer) ===
Year	Title
1972	Siddhartha

=== Bengali discography (as composer) ===
Total number of films: 147

Year	Title	Notes
1947	Abhiyatri	
1947	Purbaraag	
1948	Bhuli Naai	
1948	Padma Pramatta Nadi	
1948	Priyatama	
1949	Diner Par Din	
1949	'42	
1949	Sandipan Pathshala	
1949	Swami	
1951	Jighansa	
1951	Paritran	
1952	Swapno O Samadhi	Jointly with Khagen Dasgupta
1955	Shapmochan	
1956	Suryamukhi	
1957	Shesh Parichay	
1957	Tasher Ghar	
1957	Harano Sur	
1958	Lukochuri	
1958	Shikar	
1958	Surjatoran	
1958	Joutuk	
1958	Neel Akasher Neechey	
1959	Deep Jwele Jaai	
1959	Khelaghar	
1959	Marutirtha Hinglaj	
1959	Sonar Harin	
1959	Kshaniker Atithi	
1960	Baishey Shravan	
1960	Gariber Meye	
1960	Kuhak	
1960	Khoka Babur Prayabartan	
1960	Shesh Paryanta	
1961	Dui Bhai	
1961	Agni Sanskar	
1961	Madhya Rater Tara	
1961	Punashcha	
1961	Saptapadi	
1961	Sathi Hara	
1961	Swaralipi	
1962	Atal Jaler Ahwan	
1962	Agun	
1962	Dada Thakur	
1962	Hansuli Banker Upakatha	
1962	Nabadiganta	
1963	Badshah	
1963	Barnachora	
1963	Ek Tukro Agun	
1963	High Heel	
1963	Palatak	
1963	Saat Pake Bandha	
1963	Shesh Prahar	
1963	Tridhara	
1964	Arohi	
1964	Bibhas	
1964	Natun Tirtha	
1964	Pratinidhi	
1964	Prabhater Rang	
1964	Swarga Hotey Biday	
1964	Sindure Megh	
1965	Alor Pipasa	
1965	Ek Tuku Basa	
1965	Ek Tuku Chhonya Lage	
1965	Suryatapa	
1966	Kanch Kata Hirey	
1966	Manihar	
1967	Balika Badhu	
1967	Dushtu Prajapati	
1967	Nayika Sangbad	
1967	Ajana Shapath	
1968	Adwitiya	
1968	Baghini	
1968	Hansamithun	
1968	Jiban Sangeet	
1968	Panchasar	
1968	Parisodh	
1969	Chena Achena	
1969	Man Niye	
1969	Parineeta	
1969	Shuk Sari	
1970	Deshbandhu Chittaranjan	
1970	Duti Mon	
1971	Kuheli	
1971	Malayadan	
1971	Nabarag	
1971	Nimantran	
1971	Sansar	
1971	Mahabiplabi Aurobindo	
1972	Anindita	
1974	Bikele Bhorer Phool	
1974	Shriman Prithviraj	
1974	Thagini	
1974	Phuleshwari	
1975	Agniswar	
1975	Mohan Baganer Meye	
1975	Nishi Mrigaya	
1975	Raag Anuraag	
1975	Sansar Simantey	
1976	Banhi Sikha	
1976	Datta	
1976	Sankhabish	
1976	Pratisruti	
1977	Din Amader	
1977	Hatey Roilo Tin	
1977	Mantramugdha	
1977	Pratima	
1977	Proxy	
1977	Rajani	
1977	Sanai	
1977	Shesh Raksha	
1977	Swati	
1978	Ganadevata	
1978	Nadi Theke Sagare	
1978	Pranay Pasha	
1979	Shahar Theke Dooray	
1979	Nauka Dubi	
1980	Bandhan	
1980	Dadar Kirti	
1980	Paka Dekha	
1980	Pankhiraj	
1980	Shesh Bichar	
1981	Kapal Kundala	
1981	Khelar Putul	
1981	Meghmukti	
1981	Subarna Golak	
1982	Chhoto Maa	
1982	Chhut	
1982	Uttar Meleni	
1982	Pratiksha	
1983	Amar Geeti	
1983	Rajeshwari	
1984	Agni Shuddhi	
1984	Ajantay	
1984	Bishabriksha	
1984	Didi	
1984	Madhuban	
1984	Suryatrishna	
1985	Bhalobasa Bhalobasa	
1985	Tagari	
1986	Pathbhola	
1986	Ashirwad	
1987	Pratibha	
1987	Tuni bou	
1987	Boba Sanai	
1988	Surer Sathi	
1988	Parashmani	
1988	Agaman	
1989	Bhalobasar Rat	

=== Hindi discography (as composer) ===
Year	Title
1952	Anand Math
1954	Daku Ki Ladki
1954	Ferry
1954	Nagin
1954	Jagriti
1954	Samrat
1954	Shart
1955	Bahu
1955	Bandish
1955	Bhagwat Mahima
1955	Lagan
1956	Anjaan
1956	Arab Ka Saudagar
1956	Bandhan
1956	Durgesh Nandini
1956	Ek Hi Raasta
1956	Hamara Watan
1956	Inspector
1956	Laalten
1956	Taj
1957	Bandi
1957	Champakali
1957	Ek Jhalak
1957	Hill Station
1957	Kitna Badal Gaya Insaan
1957	Miss Mary
1957	Payal
1957	Yahudi Ki Ladki
1957	Fashion
1958	Do Mastane
1958	Police
1958	Sahara
1959	Chand
1959	Hum Bhi Insaan Hai
1960	Girl Friend
1960	Duniya Jhukti Hai
1960	Masoom
1962	Bees Saal Baad
1962	Maa Beta
1962	Sahib Bibi Aur Ghulam
1963	Bin Badal Barsaat
1964	Kohraa
1965	Do Dil
1965	Faraar
1966	Biwi Aur Makaan
1966	Sannata
1966	Anupama
1967	Majhli Didi
1968	Do Dooni Char
1969	Khamoshi
1969	Rahgeer
1969	Devi Choudhurani
1970	Us Raat Ke Baad
1972	Bees Saal Pehle
1977	Do Ladke Dono Kadke
1979	Love in Canada

=== Discography in other languages (as a composer) ===
Year	Title
1961	Ayel Basant Bahar
1964	Balma Bada Nadaan
1955	Kanavane Kan Kanda Deivam (Tamil)

== Discography (as playback singer) ==
=== Bengali film songs ===
Year	Film	Song	Composer(s)	Lyricist	Co-singer
1943	Priyo Bandhabi	"Pather Shesh Kothay"	Pranab Dey	Rabindranath Tagore	
1947	Mondir	"Gohon Rater Ekla Pothik"	Subal Dasgupta		
1955	Shap Mochan	"Surer Akashe Tumi"	Hemanta Mukherjee	Bimal Ghosh	
1955	Shap Mochan	"Bose Achhi Path Cheye"	Hemanta Mukherjee	Bimal Ghosh	
1955	Shap Mochan	"Jhar Uthechhe Baul Batash"	Hemanta Mukherjee	Bimal Ghosh	
1955	Shap Mochan	"Shono Bandhu Shono"	Hemanta Mukherjee	Bimal Ghosh	
1956	Asamapta	"Kando Keno Mon Re"	Nachiketa Ghosh	Gauriprasanna Mazumder	
1956	Trijama	"Seetaram Do Sharir"	Nachiketa Ghosh	Gauriprasanna Mazumder	
1957	Chandranath	"Rajar Dulari Seeta"	Robin Chatterjee	Gauriprasanna Mazumder	
1957	Chandranath	"Akash Prithibi Shone"	Robin Chatterjee	Gauriprasanna Mazumder	
1957	Harano Sur	"Aaj Dujonar Duti Poth"	Hemanta Mukherjee	Gauriprasanna Mazumder	
1957	Prithibi Amare Chay	"Ghorer Bondhon Chhere"	Nachiketa Ghosh	Gauriprasanna Mazumder	
1957	Prithibi Amare Chay	"Nilamwala Chhana"	Nachiketa Ghosh	Gauriprasanna Mazumder	
1957	Prithibi Amare Chay	"Durer Manush Kachhe Eso"	Nachiketa Ghosh	Gauriprasanna Mazumder	
1958	Indrani	"Surjo Dobar Pala"	Nachiketa Ghosh	Gauriprasanna Mazumder	
1958	Indrani	"Bhangre Bhangre Bhang"	Nachiketa Ghosh	Gauriprasanna Mazumder	
1958	Indrani	"Neer Choto Khoti Nei"	Nachiketa Ghosh	Gauriprasanna Mazumder	Geeta Dutt
1958	Joutuk	"Moneri Kothati Ogo"	Hemanta Mukherjee	Gauriprasanna Mazumdar	solo
1958	Joutuk	"Ei Je Pother Ei Dekha"	Hemanta Mukherjee	Gauriprasanna Mazumdar	solo
1958	O Amar Desher Mati	"Bhoot Amar Poot"			
1959	Neel Akasher Neechey	"Neel Akasher Neeche"	Hemanta Mukherjee	Gauriprasanna Mazumder	
1959	Neel Akasher Neechey	"O Nodi Re"	Hemanta Mukherjee	Gauriprasanna Mazumder	
1959	Marutirtha Hinglaj	"Pather Klanti Bhule"	Hemanta Mukherjee	Gauriprasanna Mazumder	
1959	Marutirtha Hinglaj	"Hey Chandrachur"	Hemanta Mukherjee	Gauriprasanna Mazumder	
1959	Marutirtha Hinglaj	"Sarbasya Buddhirupena"	Hemanta Mukherjee	Gauriprasanna Mazumder	
1959	Marutirtha Hinglaj	"Tomar Bhubone Mago"	Hemanta Mukherjee	Gauriprasanna Mazumder	
1960	Kuhak	"Aro Kachhe Eso"	Hemanta Mukherjee	Gauriprasanna Mazumder	
1960	Kuhak	"Bishnupriya Go"	Hemanta Mukherjee	Gauriprasanna Mazumder	
1960	Kuhak	"Hay Hapay Je Ei Hapor"	Hemanta Mukherjee	Gauriprasanna Mazumder	
1960	Kuhak	"Nawal Kishori Go"	Hemanta Mukherjee	Gauriprasanna Mazumder	
1960	Kuhak	"Peyechhi Porosh Manik"	Hemanta Mukherjee	Gauriprasanna Mazumder	
1960	Kuhak	"Saratu Din Dhore"	Hemanta Mukherjee	Gauriprasanna Mazumder	
1960	Shesh Porjonto	"Ei Balukabelay Ami Likhechhinu"	Hemanta Mukherjee	Gauriprasanna Mazumder	
1960	Shesh Porjonto	"Ei Meghla Dine Ekla"	Hemanta Mukherjee	Gauriprasanna Mazumder	
1960	Shesh Porjonto	"Keno Dure Thako"	Hemanta Mukherjee	Gauriprasanna Mazumder	
1961	Dui Bhai	"Taare Bole Diyo"	Hemanta Mukherjee	Gauriprasanna Mazumder	solo
1961	Dui Bhai	"Amar Jiboenr Eto Khushi"	Hemanta Mukherjee	Gauriprasanna Mazumder	solo
1961	Dui Bhai	"Ogo Ja Peyechi"	Hemanta Mukherjee	Gauriprasanna Mazumder	solo
1961	Dui Bhai	"Gangey Dheu Khele Jay"	Hemanta Mukherjee	Gauriprasanna Mazumder	Ila Bose
1961	Rai Bahadur	"Jay Din Emni Jodi"	Salil Chowdhury	Salil Chowdhury	
1961	Rai Bahadur	"Ogo Ke Dake Amay"	Salil Chowdhury	Salil Chowdhury	
1961	Rai Bahadur	"Raat Kuheli Chharano"	Salil Chowdhury	Salil Chowdhury	
1961	Saptapadi	"Ei Poth Jodi Na Shesh Hoy"	Hemanta Mukherjee	Gauriprasanna Mazumder	Sandhya Mukherjee
1961	Swaralipi	"Doyal Re Koto Leela Jano"	Hemanta Mukherjee	Gauriprasanna Mazumder	
1961	Swaralipi	"Je Bashi Bhenge Geche" (Part 1)	Hemanta Mukherjee	Gauriprasanna Mazumder	
1961	Swaralipi	"Je Bashi Bhenge Geche" (Part 2)	Hemanta Mukherjee	Gauriprasanna Mazumder	
1961	Dada Thakur	"O Shonre Mon Amar"	Hemanta Mukherjee	Sharat Chandra Pandit	
1961	Dada Thakur	"Vote Diye Jaa"	Hemanta Mukherjee	Sharat Chandra Pandit	Amal Mukherjee, chorus
1962	Atal Jaler Ahwan	"E Kon Choncholota Jaage"	Hemanta Mukherjee	Gauriprasanna Mazumder	
1963	Palatak	"Aha Krishna Kalo"	Hemanta Mukherjee	Mukul Dutt	
1963	Palatak	"Dosh Diyo Na Amay Bondhu"	Hemanta Mukherjee	Mukul Dutt	
1963	Palatak	"Jibanpurer Pathik Re Bhai"	Hemanta Mukherjee	Mukul Dutt	
1963	Palatak	"Sakhi Hey Amar Jware Anga"	Hemanta Mukherjee	Mukul Dutt	
1964	Bibhas	"Etodin Pore Tumi"	Hemanta Mukherjee	Gauriprasanna Mazumder	
1964	Bibhas	"Taray Taray Joluk Baati"	Hemanta Mukherjee	Gauriprasanna Mazumder	
1964	Bibhas	"Jokhon Porbena Mor"	Rabindranath Tagore		
1965 ! rowspan="2" | Surjatapa | "Ke Jabe Ke Jabe Re" | rowspan="2" | Hemanta Mukherjee | rowspan='2' | Gauriprasanna Mazumder | rowspan="2" | |- | "Sob Kichu Bojhano Ki Jay" |-	AlorPipasa	"Kaschitkanta Biraha Guruna"	Hemanta Mukherjee	Kalidasa	
1965 ! rowspan="2" | Surjatapa | "Ke Jabe Ke Jabe Re" | rowspan="2" | Hemanta Mukherjee | rowspan='2' | Gauriprasanna Mazumder | rowspan="2" | |- | "Sob Kichu Bojhano Ki Jay" |-	AlorPipasa	"Bidyudwantang Lalita Banita"	Hemanta Mukherjee	Kalidasa	
1965 ! rowspan="2" | Surjatapa | "Ke Jabe Ke Jabe Re" | rowspan="2" | Hemanta Mukherjee | rowspan='2' | Gauriprasanna Mazumder | rowspan="2" | |- | "Sob Kichu Bojhano Ki Jay" |-	AlorPipasa	"Shrinnante Vishwe Amitatsya Putra"	Hemanta Mukherjee	Kalidasa	
1965 ! rowspan="2" | Surjatapa | "Ke Jabe Ke Jabe Re" | rowspan="2" | Hemanta Mukherjee | rowspan='2' | Gauriprasanna Mazumder | rowspan="2" | |- | "Sob Kichu Bojhano Ki Jay" |-	Monihar	"Ke Jeno Go Dekechhe Amay" (male)	Hemanta Mukherjee	Pulak Banerjee	
1965 ! rowspan="2" | Surjatapa | "Ke Jabe Ke Jabe Re" | rowspan="2" | Hemanta Mukherjee | rowspan='2' | Gauriprasanna Mazumder | rowspan="2" | |- | "Sob Kichu Bojhano Ki Jay" |-	Monihar	"Nijhum Sandhyay Pantho Pakhira" (male)	Hemanta Mukherjee	Pulak Banerjee	
1965 ! rowspan="2" | Surjatapa | "Ke Jabe Ke Jabe Re" | rowspan="2" | Hemanta Mukherjee | rowspan='2' | Gauriprasanna Mazumder | rowspan="2" | |- | "Sob Kichu Bojhano Ki Jay" |-	Monihar	"Sob Kotha Bola Holo"	Hemanta Mukherjee	Pulak Banerjee	
1965 ! rowspan="2" | Surjatapa | "Ke Jabe Ke Jabe Re" | rowspan="2" | Hemanta Mukherjee | rowspan='2' | Gauriprasanna Mazumder | rowspan="2" | |- | "Sob Kichu Bojhano Ki Jay" |-	Monihar	"Ami Hote Parini Akash"	Hemanta Mukherjee	Pulak Banerjee	
1965 ! rowspan="2" | Surjatapa | "Ke Jabe Ke Jabe Re" | rowspan="2" | Hemanta Mukherjee | rowspan='2' | Gauriprasanna Mazumder | rowspan="2" | |- | "Sob Kichu Bojhano Ki Jay" |-	Monihar	"Ke Jeno Go Dekechhe Amay" (duet)	Hemanta Mukherjee	Pulak Banerjee	Lata Mangeshkar
1965 ! rowspan="2" | Surjatapa | "Ke Jabe Ke Jabe Re" | rowspan="2" | Hemanta Mukherjee | rowspan='2' | Gauriprasanna Mazumder | rowspan="2" | |- | "Sob Kichu Bojhano Ki Jay" |-	1966	Kal Tumi Aleya	"Ami Jai Chole Jai" (version 1)	Uttam Kumar	Pulak Banerjee
1965 ! rowspan="2" | Surjatapa | "Ke Jabe Ke Jabe Re" | rowspan="2" | Hemanta Mukherjee | rowspan='2' | Gauriprasanna Mazumder | rowspan="2" | |- | "Sob Kichu Bojhano Ki Jay" |-	1966	Kal Tumi Aleya	"Jai Chole Jai" (version 2)	Uttam Kumar	Pulak Banerjee
Notun Tirtho	1966	"He Mor Chitto"			
Notun Jibon	1966	"Emon Ami Ghor Bedhechi"	Rajen Sarkar	Pulak Banerjee	
Notun Jibon	1966	"Ami Gaan Shonabo"	Rajen Sarkar	Pulak Banerjee	
Notun Jibon	1966	"Lajboti Nupurer Rinijhini"	Rajen Sarkar	Pulak Banerjee	
1967	Ajana Shapath	"Notun Notun Rong Dhorechhe"	Hemanta Mukherjee	Pulak Banerjee	
1967	Ajana Shapath	"O Akash Sona Sona"	Hemanta Mukherjee	Miltoo Ghosh	
1967	Balika Bodhu	"Lag Lag Ronger Bhelki"	Hemanta Mukherjee	Gauriprasanna Mazumder	chorus
1967	Balika Bodhu	"Shuk Bole Keno Sharee"	Hemanta Mukherjee	Gauriprasanna Mazumder	Bela Mukherjee
1967	Balika Bodhu	"Ami Kusum Tuliya"	Hemanta Mukherjee	Gauriprasanna Mazumder	Bani Dasgupta
1967	Balika Bodhu	"Bhojo Gourango"	Hemanta Mukherjee	Traditional	
1967	Mon Niye	"Ogo Kajol Noyona Horini"	Hemanta Mukherjee	Pulak Banerjee	
1967	Mon Niye	"Bhalobeshe Digonto Diyechho"	Hemanta Mukherjee	Pulak Banerjee	Asha Bhosle
1967	Mon Niye	"Ami Poth Vola Ek Pothik"	Rabindranath Tagore		Asha Bhosle
1967	Nayika Sangbad	"Ei Purnima Raat"	Hemanta Mukherjee		
1968	Baghini	"O Radhe Thomke Geli Keno"	Hemanta Mukherjee	Mukul Dutt	
1968	Baghini	"Jokhon Daaklo Bashi"	Hemanta Mukherjee	Mukul Dutt	
1968	Hangsa Mithun	"Ami Krishnochurar Abir Niye"	Hemanta Mukherjee		Sandhya Mukherjee
1968	Hangsa Mithun	"Ore Aay Aay Aayre Sobai"	Hemanta Mukherjee		Manabendra Mukherjee
1968	Hangsa Mithun	"Surjer Moto Shaswoto Hok"	Hemanta Mukherjee		
1969	Duti Mon	"Ke Daake Amay"	Hemanta Mukherjee	Pulak Banerjee	
1969	Duti Mon	"Ami Jotoi Tomake Dekhi"	Hemanta Mukherjee	Pulak Banerjee	
1969	Kamallata	"Bhaja Hoon Re Mon Amar"	Robin Chatterjee	Gobindadas	
1969	Kamallata	"Ei Na Madhobi Tole"	Robin Chatterjee	Traditional	
1969	Kamallata	"Dekho Sokhi Sajilo Nondokumar"	Robin Chatterjee	Pranab Roy	
1969	Kamallata	"Hiya Bole Tumi Amar"	Robin Chatterjee	Pranab Roy	
1969	Pita Putra	"Bhorer Aloy Porlo Tomay Mone"	Hemanta Mukherjee	Pranab Roy	
1969	Pita Putra	"Tomay Amay Mile"	Hemanta Mukherjee		
1969	Pita Putra	"Raag Je Tomar Mishti"	Hemanta Mukherjee	Sandhya Mukherjee	
1969	Teerbhumi	"Teerbhumi Khoje"			
1971	Dhanyi Meye	"E Byatha Ki Je Byatha"	Nachiketa Ghosh	Pronab Roy	
1971	Dhanyi Meye	"Radhe Monta Rekhe Eli"	Nachiketa Ghosh	Pronab Roy	
1971	Nimantran	"Piriti Boliya Ekti Komol"			
1971	Nimantran	"Singo Prishthe Bhor Koriye"			
1971	Nimantran	"Tara Maa Maago"			
1972	Anindita	"Diner Sheshe Ghumer Deshe"	Hemanta Mukherjee	Mukul Dutt	
1972	Stree	"Khirki Theke Singhoduar"	Nachiketa Ghosh		
1972	Stree	"Sakkhi Thakuk Jhorapata"	Nachiketa Ghosh		
1972	Stree	"Hajar Tarar Jhaarbatita"	Nachiketa Ghosh		Manna Dey
1972	Stree	"Sokhi Kalo Amar Bhalo"	Nachiketa Ghosh		Manna Dey
1973	Dhire Bohe Meghna	"Koto Je Dhire Bohe Meghna"	Samar Das, Satya Saha	Mohammad Moniruzzaman	Sandhya Mukherjee
1973	Sonar Khancha	"Jaare Ja Ure Rajar Kumar" (version 2)	Bireswar Sarkar	Bireswar Sarkar	
1973	Sonar Khancha	"Shudhu Bhalobasha Diye"	Bireswar Sarkar	Bireswar Sarkar	
1973	Sonar Khancha	"Ke Jaane Ko Ghonta"	Bireswar Sarkar	Bireswar Sarkar	
1974	Fuleswari	"Jeona Daarao Bondhu"	Hemanta Mukherjee		
1974	Fuleswari	"Ami Tomay Koto Khujilam"	Hemanta Mukherjee		
1974	Fuleswari	"Ami Tomay Boro Bhalobashi"	Hemanta Mukherjee		
1974	Fuleswari	"Phuleshwari Phuleshwari"	Hemanta Mukherjee		
1974	Fuleswari	"Ami Dekhte Bhalobashi"	Hemanta Mukherjee		
1974	Fuleswari	"Tumi Shotodol Hoye"	Hemanta Mukherjee		
1975	Raag Anurag	"Ami Gaan Gai"	Hemanta Mukherjee	Pulak Banerjee	
1975	Raag Anurag	"Khela Amar Bhangbe Jokhon"	Hemanta Mukherjee	Pulak Banerjee	
1975	Raag Anurag	"Sei Duti Chokh"	Hemanta Mukherjee	Pulak Banerjee	
1975	Raag Anurag	"Sonar Oi Angti Theke"	Hemanta Mukherjee	Pulak Banerjee	
1975	Raag Anurag	"Tomader Kachhe Esechhilam"	Hemanta Mukherjee	Pulak Banerjee	
1975	Raag Anurag	"Ki Gaan Shonabo Bolo"	Hemanta Mukherjee	Pulak Banerjee	Haimanti Shukla
1975	Raag Anurag	"Ogo Sundori Tumi Ke"	Hemanta Mukherjee	Pulak Banerjee	various
1975	Sanyasi Raja	"Ka Tobo Kanta"	Shyamal Mitra	Shankaracharya	
1976	Asadharon	"Surjer Rokto Asto Akashtake"	Nachiketa Ghosh		
1976	Asadharon	"Amar baba Bhalo Chilo"	Nachiketa Ghosh		
1976	Asadharon	"Kanu Chhara Jemon Bashi Nei"	Nachiketa Ghosh		
1976	Asadharon	"Ki Hote Ki Hoye Gelo"	Nachiketa Ghosh		Haimanti Shukla
1976	Datta	"Jamunate Dekhlam Soi"	Hemanta Mukherjee	Pranab Roy	
1976	Datta	"Mon Dilamna Sokhi"	Hemanta Mukherjee	Pranab Roy	
1976	Priyo Bandhobi	"Ami Saheb O Noi"	Nachiketa Ghosh		
1976	Sudur Niharika	"Torir Naam Jibon Tori"	Manabendra Mukhopadhyay	Shyamal Gupta	
1977	Padma Nadir Majhi	"Padma Nadir Majhi"	Dinendra Chowdhury	Manik Bandyopadhyay	Aarti Mukherjee, Dhananjay Bhattacharya, Anup Ghoshal and others
1977	Praner Thakur Ramkrishna	"Kolpotoru Tumi Praner Thakur			
1977	Proxy	"Jodi Keu Deke Bole"	Hemanta Mukherjee		
1977	Proxy	"Kichhu Pelam Ami"	Hemanta Mukherjee		
1977	Proxy	"Jodi Tomar Chokher Akash"	Hemanta Mukherjee		Aarti Mukherjee
1978	Korunamoyi	"Anondomoyi"	Sudhin Dasgupta		
1978	Korunamoyi	"Kalo Meghe Kali Chhaya"	Sudhin Dasgupta		
1978	Korunamoyi	"Ja Debi Sorbobhuteshu"	Sudhin Dasgupta		Aarti Mukherjee
1978	Dhanraj Tamang	"Dhanaraj Tamang Ekti Sudhu Naam			
1979	Nondon	"Mukhbhora Hashi"			
1980	Noukadubi	"Oshrunodir Sudur Paare"			
1980	Pompa	"Je Prodip"	Nirmal Chakraborty	Samarendra Ghoshal	
1980	Putul Ghor	"Thikana Hariye Phela"			
1980	Upalabdhi	"Etodine Bujhechi Tomay"			
1981	Chameli Memsaheb	"O Bideshi Takao"	Bhupen Hazarika	Shibdas Banerjee	
1981	Khelar Putul	"Ami Bondhur Premagune Pora"	Hemanta Mukherjee	Traditional	Arundhati Holme Chowdhury
1981	Khelar Putul	"Krondosi Pothocharinee"	Atul Prasad Sen		
1981	Pratishodh	"Shudhu Byathar Aghate"	Ajoy Das	Pulak Banerjee	
1981	Subarna Golak	"Din Nei Raat Nei"	Hemanta Mukherjee		chorus
1982	Sonar Bangla	"Ei Je Bangla"	Neeta Sen	Gauriprasanna Mazumder	Sandhya Mukherjee
1982	Sonar Bangla	"Tuturidhun"	Neeta Sen	Gauriprasanna Mazumder	Aarti Mukherjee, Haimanti Shukla
1982	Rajbodhu	"Boro Asha Kore"	Abhijit Banerjee, Rabindranath Tagore	Rabindranath Tagore	Arundhati Holme Chowdhury
1983	Bonoshree	"Ashwine Hok Aghrane Hok"	Sudhin Dasgupta		
1983	Chena Achena	"Amay Rakhte Jodi"	Abhijit Banerjee		
1983	Chena Achena	"Shono Shono"	Abhijit Banerjee		
1983	Chena Achena	"O Amar Sona Bondhure"	Abhijit Banerjee		
1983	Chena Achena	"Ekoi Poth Jeno"	Abhijit Banerjee		
1983	Tagari	"Piriti Rosher Khela"			Aarti Mukherjee
1984	Shilalipi	"Surjo Gelo Astachole"	Suparnakanti Ghosh	Palash Bandyopadhyay	
1984	Shilalipi	"Aajo Mone Pore Barebare"	Sudhin Dasgupta	Subir Hazra	
1984	Shilalipi	"Kar Kotha Bhebe Bhebe"	Sudhin Dasgupta	Subir Hazra	

=== Bengali non-film songs ===
Year	Film	Song	Composer(s)	Lyricist	Co-singer
1993	Ramkrishnayan	"Ramkrishnayan" (part 1)	Robin Chatterjee	Achinta Kumar Sengupta	Manna Dey, Banasree Sengupta
1993	Ramkrishnayan	"Ramkrishnayan" (part 2)	Robin Chatterjee	Achinta Kumar Sengupta	Manna Dey, Banasree Sengupta

== Sources ==
- Hemanta Kumar Mukhopadhyay, "Ananda dhara", Deb Sahitya Kutir Press, Calcutta, 1970.
- A. Rajadhakshya and P. Wilhelm, "An Encyclopedia of Indian Cinema", 2nd ed., British Film Institute, 1999.
- S. Bhattacharya, "Amar gaaner swaralipi", A. Mukherjee Press, Calcutta, 1988.
- https://web.archive.org/web/20100108062601/http://www.bfjaawards.com/legacy/pastwin/198952.htm
