= Baat Ek Raat Ki =

1962 film

- Directed by: Shankar Mukherjee
- Starring: Dev Anand; Waheeda Rehman; Johnny Walker; Asit Sen
- Music by: Sachin Dev Burman
- Release date: 1962
- Language: Hindi
- Box office: 72,00,000

Baat Ek Raat Ki (English: A Tale of One Night) is a 1962 Hindi film directed by Shankar Mukherjee, starring Dev Anand, Waheeda Rehman and Johnny Walker.

The film has music by Sachin Dev Burman, who gave some memorable songs in the films such as "Na Tum Hamen Jano", sung by Hemant Kumar and Suman Kalyanpur, "Akela Hoon Main Is Duniya Mein" by Mohammed Rafi, and the hit qawwali, "Kisne Chilman Se Maara" by Manna Dey.

== Plot ==
Neela (Waheeda Rehman) is in police custody for committing a murder. Believing that she did it, she confesses. When renowned lawyer Rajeshwar (Dev Anand) decides to represent her, he accepts her guilt, but as he goes deep into the details of her story and the circumstances, he is not sure whether or not she is guilty. What could have placed Neela at the scene of this heinous crime?

Eventually, it is revealed that Neela's employer Beni Prasad is the mastermind behind Neela's imprisonment. He is after her property and devises a plan in which Ranjan, Neela's co-actor, is to act as if he is in love with her and get her will signed. But on the night Ranjan has taken the papers to Neela and is just getting them signed, he changes his mind. He was about to surrender and tell the whole truth, when Neela held him at gunpoint — just before he could tell the name of his employer he was shot. Neela believes it's she who had killed him, whereas it was Beni Prasad, who was hiding and listening who had shot Ranjan dead.

Rajesh disguises himself and appears at the court on the final day and accuses Beni Prasad and tells the whole story. In the whole story, CID (Johnny Walker) aids him as well as Kalu, a street beggar who pretends to be blind acts as a witness. The final scene shows Rajesh driving his car and saying: "what do i get?? ...money, fame and nothing else!!" when he images Neela talking to him...answering his questions. At last, Neela appears from the back of the car and the happy couple are reunited and are said to be really in love. The movie ends with Rajesh and Neela driving the car to the song "Jo Ijaazat Ho To Ek Baat".

== Cast ==
- Dev Anand as Rajeshwar
- Waheeda Rehman as Neela / Meena
- Johnny Walker as C.I. Dholakia "C.I.D."
- Chandrashekhar as Ranjan
- Ulhas as Prosecuting Attorney
- Jagdish Sethi as Beni Prasad
- Asit Sen as Ramu

== Soundtrack ==
Baat Ek Raat Ki

Soundtrack album by Sachin Dev Burman
- Released: 1962 (India)
- Genre: Film soundtrack
- Label: Saregama
- Producer: Sachin Dev Burman

Sachin Dev Burman chronology
Tere Ghar Ke Samne (1963)	Baat Ek Raat Ki (1962)	Dr. Vidya (1962)

The soundtrack includes the following tracks, composed by S. D. Burman with lyrics by Majrooh Sultanpuri

Song	Singer
"Na Tum Hamen Jano"	Hemant Kumar
"Na Tum Hamen Jano"	Suman Kalyanpur
"Sheeshe Ka Ho Ke Patthar Ka Dil"	Lata Mangeshkar, Mohammed Rafi
"Suno Suno Jaan-E-Man, Kaho Kaho Jaan-E-Man"	Asha Bhosle, Mohammed Rafi
"Jo Hai Deewane Pyar Ke, Sada Chale Talvar Pe"	Asha Bhosle, Mohammed Rafi
"Aaj Ka Din Bhi Phika Phika, Tere Gham Mein Bita Bita"	Asha Bhosle, Mohammed Rafi
"Akela Hoon Main"	Mohammed Rafi
"Kisne Chilman Se Mara"	Manna Dey
