= Namkeen =

1982 film by Gulzar

- Film poster
- Directed by: Gulzar
- Screenplay by: Gulzar
- Based on: Akal Basanta by Samaresh Basu
- Produced by: Jayant Malkan
- Starring: Sanjeev Kumar; Sharmila Tagore; Shabana Azmi; Waheeda Rehman; Kiran Vairale
- Cinematography: M. Sampat
- Edited by: Waman Bhosle; Gurudutt Shirali
- Music by: R. D. Burman
- Release date: 2 April 1982
- Running time: 112 min
- Country: India
- Language: Hindi

Namkeen (transl. Savory), is a 1982 Hindi-language social drama film, directed by Gulzar, and starring Sanjeev Kumar, Sharmila Tagore, Shabana Azmi and Waheeda Rehman. It was yet another film by Gulzar made on some very sensitive but untouched aspects of Indian society especially in rural areas. The story Akal Basanta was by Samaresh Basu on whose story, Gulzar had previously made Kitaab (1977).

The film won the National Film Awards in 1983 for Best Audiography for Essabhai M. Suratwala. At the 30th Filmfare Awards, Namkeen won Best Story and Best Art Direction, while Waheeda Rehman and Kiran Vairale received nominations for Filmfare Award for Best Supporting Actress.

== Plot ==
Three unmarried sisters live in a remote village in Himachal Pradesh with their old mother, Jugni (Waheeda Rehman), a former nautanki (folk theatre) dancer, who sells spices and takes in boarders to make a living. The three daughters are named like flavors in food. The 'salty' eldest daughter Nimki (Sharmila Tagore), quietly but firmly holds the household together. The 'sweet' middle sister is Mitthu (Shabana Azmi), an intelligent and romantic girl, unable to speak. The 'tangy' youngest one is Chinki (Kiran Vairale), a bold and vibrant teenager, who turns out to be very perceptive. Their quiet little haven is occasionally threatened by the alcoholic father Kishanlal (Ram Mohan), a sarangi player from the travelling troupe, who keeps trying to reclaim his daughters. Jugni would have left him years ago to protect her daughters from the life of a nautanki dancer which she had always struggled to escape.

The four women live in a very old house outside the village. Gerulal (Sanjeev Kumar) is a truck driver who joins this peculiar household for a brief time as a tenant. Initially stunned by their non-social ways, watching the grit with which they struggle through their difficulties, he is filled with respect for them. Despite the crisis they face in terms of money and facilities, all three sisters maintaining their moral values and dignified behavior. He begins to like Nimki. Mitthu, whom he sympathizes with, develops feelings for Gerulal. When Gerulal needs to move on from that region because of work, he proposes to Nimki. She turns down his proposal citing the responsibility of her sisters and her mother, and suggests he marry Mitthu instead. Gerulal is unable to comply with her request.

Three years later, Gerulal is shocked to find Chinki performing at a village nautanki. He learns how drastically things changed after he left the village. Mitthu loses her mental balance and accidentally falls off a cliff and dies. Jugni dies from the shock and Chinki, with not much left to choose from, has joined her father's troupe. Gerulal rushes back to Jugni's crumbling old house to find Nimki, alone and aged beyond her years, looking almost like a reflection of her mother. This time, he takes her away with him.

== Cast ==
- Sanjeev Kumar as Gerulal
- Sharmila Tagore as Nimki
- Shabana Azmi as Mitthu
- Waheeda Rehman as Jyoti / Jugni
- Kiran Vairale as Chinki
- Bhag Singh as Kartar Singh
- Ram Mohan
- T.P Jain

== Production ==
Originally Rekha was cast in the role of Nimki, which was later played by Sharmila Tagore.

== Reception ==
Chander Uday Singh of India Today wrote, "In Namkeen, based on a story by Samresh Babu, Gulzar steps further out than he has ever done before. The theme is stark, straightforward, and surprisingly uninhibited. Almost theatrical in the way it moves, the film veers sharply from a simple, uncomplicated story about a family which falls collectively in love with its temporary tenant, to a near-morbid drama which is suddenly withdrawn."

== Soundtrack ==
Namkeen

Studio album by R. D. Burman
- Released: 1982
- Genre: Film Soundtrack / Filmi
- Label: His Master's Voice

R. D. Burman chronology
Angoor (1982)	Namkeen (1982)	Yeh Vaada Raha (1982)

The soundtrack was composed by R. D. Burman and lyrics by Gulzar, and featured songs by playback singers Kishore Kumar and Asha Bhosle.

Song	Singer
"Raah Pe Rehte Hai"	Kishore Kumar
"Aanki Chali, Baanki Chali"	Asha Bhosle
"Badi Der Se Megha Barsa"	Asha Bhosle
"Phir Se Aaiyo Badra Bidesi"	Asha Bhosle
"Aisa Laga Koi Surma"	Alka Yagnik

== Awards ==
30th National Film Awards:

- Best Audiography: Essabhai M. Suratwala

30th Filmfare Awards:

Won

- Best Story – Samaresh Basu
- Best Art Direction – Ajit Nanerjee

Nominated

- Best Supporting Actress – Kiran Vairale
- Best Supporting Actress – Waheeda Rehman
