= Lamhe =

1991 Indian film by Yash Chopra

- Theatrical release poster
- Directed by: Yash Chopra
- Written by: Honey Irani; Rahi Masoom Reza
- Produced by: Yash Chopra
- Starring: Sridevi; Anil Kapoor; Waheeda Rehman; Anupam Kher
- Cinematography: Manmohan Singh
- Edited by: Keshav Naidu
- Music by: Shiv-Hari
- Production company: Yash Raj Films
- Distributed by: Yash Raj Films
- Release date: 22 November 1991
- Running time: 187 minutes
- Country: India
- Language: Hindi

Lamhe (Moments) is a 1991 Indian Hindi-language musical romantic drama film directed and produced by Yash Chopra and written by Honey Irani and Rahi Masoom Raza. The film stars Sridevi (in a dual role as both mother and daughter) and Anil Kapoor in lead roles, along with Waheeda Rehman, Anupam Kher, Deepak Malhotra, and Dippy Sagoo in pivotal supporting roles. The film marks the second and final collaboration between Sridevi and Chopra after Chandni (1989).

Produced by Chopra under his production banner Yash Raj Films, Lamhe was shot in two schedules in Rajasthan and in London. Although the film did moderate business domestically, it was critically acclaimed.

A recipient of several accolades, Lamhe won Best Costume Design at the 39th National Film Awards. Additionally, at the 37th Filmfare Awards, the film received a leading 13 nominations, including Best Director (Chopra), Best Actor (Kapoor), Best Supporting Actress (Rehman) and Best Supporting Actor (Kher), and won a leading 5 awards – Best Film, Best Actress (Sridevi), Best Comedian (Kher), Best Story (Irani) and Best Dialogue (Masoom Raza).

Lamhe featured on Outlook's list of Bollywood's Best Films. It has been cited as Chopra's personal favorite of the films he has made. This was one of the last films scripted by Masoom Raza; he died a couple of months after its release. On the occasion of the Centenary of Indian Cinema in 2013, Lamhe featured among the Top 10 Romantic Movies Of 100 Years.

== Plot ==
A young NRI, Virendra Pratap Singh (Anil Kapoor), also known as Viren, comes to his homeland in Rajasthan, India for the first time along with his former governess, Durgadevi (Waheeda Rehman), affectionately called Dai Jaa. His late parents had migrated to London, United Kingdom long before he was born. While initially put off by the hot weather conditions and the traditional customs of the region, Viren meets the beautiful Pallavi (Sridevi) and falls in love with her almost instantly. Pallavi is the daughter of a wealthy businessman, Kothiwale Thakur (Manohar Singh), who had helped Viren's late father when his business was suffering. Viren and Pallavi become friends. However, upon noticing Viren's feelings for Pallavi, Dai Jaa indicates that Pallavi is eight years older than him, which still does not bother Viren. After losing a civil legal dispute involving his property, Pallavi's father dies of a heart attack, unable to bear the shock, and Pallavi goes into depression. Viren comes to console her at her father's mourning ceremony, only to be shocked to find Pallavi run towards her long-time boyfriend, Siddharth Kumar Bhatnagar (Deepak Malhotra), who is an airplane pilot. Viren is heartbroken, but reluctantly arranges Pallavi and Siddharth's marriage with a heavy heart and moves back to London without letting Pallavi know of his true emotions. However, in a cruel twist of fate, Viren flies down to India after learning from Dai Jaa that both Siddharth and a pregnant Pallavi have perished in a major car accident, but not before the gravely injured Pallavi gives birth to their surviving daughter, Pooja, at the hospital. Viren and Dai Jaa lament the tragic losses of Pallavi and Siddharth and a grief-stricken Viren entrusts Dai Jaa with the upbringing of the newborn Pooja.

20 years later, the now middle-aged Viren still finds it difficult to come to terms with the past and has been visiting Rajasthan every year in the two decades for Siddharth and Pallavi's death anniversary. However, he has avoided meeting Pooja on her birthday because she was born the same day Pallavi died, and the trauma and the pain of Pallavi's death are still fresh in his mind. Viren now comes back to India this year for the ritual and is shocked to see the now grown-up Pooja (also Sridevi), a spitting image of Pallavi herself. Viren feels that destiny is playing a cruel game with him, but still invites Pooja and Dai Jaa to his residence in London. In London, Viren's childhood friend, Prem Anand (Anupam Kher), is aware that Viren's heart still yearns for Pallavi, while Viren is still trying to engage himself in other works, but cannot forget Pallavi. Anita Malhotra (Dippy Sagoo), Viren's new girlfriend in London, is deeply in love with him and is also aware of Viren's love for Pallavi and constantly tries to win his attention. During Pooja and Dai Jaa's visit to London, Anita meets Pooja and realizes how she must be a constant reminder of Pallavi to Viren. Over a period of time, Pooja becomes possessive of Viren, so Anita tries to show her the truth and make her understand that she is wrong. Pooja retorts and tells Anita that if she herself is not related to Viren, Anita is not related to him either.

Anita becomes frustrated and blasts Viren for his feelings for Pooja, telling him that he should be ashamed of having feelings for a considerably younger woman, just because she resembles her late mother, whom he loved. Meanwhile, Prem understands how much Pooja is attached to Viren since childhood, but is skeptical since Viren is still living in the past in the memories of Pallavi. However, things take a drastic turn when Pooja comes across Pallavi's portrait sketched by Viren and completely misunderstands it to be her own when it is actually of her mother. She confesses her love for Viren and confronts him over the portrait, but a furious Viren rebuffs Pooja and reveals that he actually loved her late mother, who resembled her. A shattered and humiliated Pooja tells Dai Jaa that she wants to return to India. After Pooja and Dai Jaa's departure from London, Prem strongly advises a confused Viren to confront his feelings for Pooja, pointing out the huge difference between Pallavi and Pooja.

Back home, Dai Jaa persuades Pooja to get married, and she agrees on the condition that Viren must get married first. When Dai Jaa contacts Viren to let him know that Pooja has agreed to marry once Viren ties the knot, Viren agrees to marry Anita. Upon learning this, Pooja tells Dai Jaa that she never wants to get married. Back in London, Viren, Prem, and Anita are wondering why Dai Jaa is delaying her visit for Viren and Anita's marriage. Viren and Prem decide to travel to India and give Dai Jaa a surprise. Upon arriving, Viren and Prem are shocked to learn from Dai Jaa that Pooja has vowed never to marry. The climax shows a heartbroken Pooja narrating a tragic folk tale in a village show, when all of a sudden, she becomes very excited and happy to notice Viren in the audience and lies to him about already having gotten married. However, Viren confronts Pooja for hiding the truth about her marriage from him and reveals that he actually never wanted to marry Anita, since he finally realised that he is genuinely in love with Pooja and not Pallavi anymore, who, in fact, had never had romantic feelings towards him. With neither of them having gotten married, Viren and Pooja are now free to be together.

== Cast ==
- Sridevi in a dual role as Pallavi Thakur Bhatnagar / Pooja Bhatnagar (as both mother and daughter)
- Anil Kapoor as Virendra Pratap Singh (Viren / Kunwarji)
- Waheeda Rehman as Durgadevi (Dai Jaa): Viren, and later, Pooja's governess
- Anupam Kher as Prem Anand: Viren's childhood friend
- Deepak Malhotra as Siddharth Kumar Bhatnagar: Pallavi's husband and Pooja's father
- Dippy Sagoo as Anita Malhotra: Viren's girlfriend
- Manohar Singh as Kothiwale Thakur: Pallavi's father
- Lalit Tiwari as Sudheshwar Narayan Tiwari: Viren's mansion caretaker
- Vikas Anand as Dr. Vikas: Pallavi's doctor (cameo appearance)
- Ila Arun as Folk Dancer in "Morni Baga Ma Bole" song (cameo appearance)
- Richa Pallod as 5-year-old Pooja (cameo appearance)

== Music ==
The music was composed by Shiv Kumar Sharma and Hariprasad Chaurasia (together known as Shiv-Hari), and the lyrics were provided by Anand Bakshi. The song "Kabhi Main Kahoon" was composed from a melody used as background music in Chopra's Chandni (1989), also scored by Shiv-Hari.

The songs included on the official soundtrack are listed here:

Song	Singer(s)
"Yeh Lamhe Yeh Pal"	Hariharan
"Yeh Lamhe Yeh Pal" (Sad Version)	Hariharan
"Mhaare Rajasthan Ma"	Mohinuddin
"Mohe Chhedo Naa"	Lata Mangeshkar
"Chudiyan Khanak Gayeen" (contains excerpt of 'Mhaare Rajasthan Ma' in the introduction)	Lata Mangeshkar, Moinuddin and Ila Arun
"Morni Baga Ma Bole" (Sad Version)	Lata Mangeshkar
"Kabhi Main Kahoon"	Lata Mangeshkar and Hariharan
"Megha Re Megha Re"	Lata Mangeshkar and Ila Arun
"Yaad Nahin Bhool Gaya"	Lata Mangeshkar and Suresh Wadkar
"Gudiya Rani"	Lata Mangeshkar
"Meri Bindiya"	Lata Mangeshkar
"Freak Out" (Parody Song)	Pamela Chopra and Sudesh Bhosle
"Moments Of Rage" (Instrumental)	Instrumental
"Moments Of Passion" (Instrumental)	Instrumental

== Legacy ==
It was listed in Outlook magazine's list of 'All-Time Great Indian Films'. It has been cited as Chopra's personal favorite among his directorial ventures. The Times of India included it in its list of 'Top 10 Films of Yash Chopra' describing it as "a tale of love transcending the boundaries of time and space", while Rediff called it "Quite easily one of his most definitive films, Chopra surpassed his own findings of romance with the insightful, lovely Lamhe."

Sridevi played both mother and daughter in what iDiva described as "another double-role but it was unlike any played before." Hailed by Rediff as "one of the most remarkable films of her career... often considered a film way ahead of its time." Speaking to Karan Johar about the making of Lamhe, Chopra revealed, "When 90% of the London schedule was over, a tragedy took place. Sridevi's father died... She came back after 16 days and had to shoot a comedy scene... At that moment, she forgot everything and gave a wonderful scene. I understood that is the secret of her success... Why she is what she is." Sridevi's folk dance number "Morni Baga Ma Bole" was placed among the 'Top 5 Songs of Yash Chopra' by Hindustan Times.

Over the years, Lamhe has become a cult classic. Critic Rachel Dwyer wrote in her biography of the filmmaker "Yash Chopra's own favorite film, Lamhe (Moments (1991)), divided the audience on a class basis: it was hugely popular with the metropolitan elites and the overseas market, which allowed it to break even, but it had a poor box-office response (especially the repeat audience), because of its supposed incest theme." The Hindu reported that "With shades of incest, Lamhe caused more than a flutter and remained the talk of the town", while Sridevi herself admitted in an interview with Rajeev Masand that she found the subject "too bold". Rediff described its failure as "one of those bizarre, unexplained moments of cinema." Many film analysts, including Vikram Bhatt, felt that Lamhe was ahead of its time, and if released at a later period, would have been a success.

== Awards and nominations ==
39th National Film Awards:

- Best Costume Design – Neeta Lulla, Kachins & Leena Daru

37th Filmfare Awards:

Won

- Best Film – Yash Chopra
- Best Actress – Sridevi
- Best Comedian – Anupam Kher
- Best Story – Honey Irani
- Best Dialogue – Rahi Masoom Raza

Nominated

- Best Director – Yash Chopra
- Best Actor – Anil Kapoor
- Best Supporting Actress – Waheeda Rehman
- Best Supporting Actor – Anupam Kher
- Best Music Director – Shiv-Hari
- Best Lyricist – Anand Bakshi for "Kabhi Main Kahoon"
- Best Male Playback Singer – Hariharan for "Kabhi Main Kahoon"
- Best Cinematography – Manmohan Singh
