= Kohra (1964 film) =

Kohraa
- Directed by: Biren Nag
- Written by: Dhruva Chatterjee
- Produced by: Hemant Kumar
- Starring: Waheeda Rehman; Biswajeet; Lalita Pawar
- Cinematography: Marshall Braganza
- Music by: Hemant Kumar
- Production company: Geetanjali Films
- Release date: 1964
- Running time: 136 minutes
- Country: India
- Language: Hindi

Kohraa (transl. Fog) is a 1964 Indian Hindi-language horror thriller film directed by Biren Nag, starring Waheeda Rehman, Biswajeet and Lalita Pawar. The film was adapted from Daphne du Maurier's 1938 Gothic novel Rebecca, which was previously adapted by Alfred Hitchcock as Rebecca (1940), though some supernatural elements were added to it, including a few from the film Psycho.

== Plot ==
Rajeshwari meets rich Amit Kumar Singh and they both fall in love and get married. Amit brings Rajeshwari to his home - A huge imposing mansion in middle of Moors. Rajeshwari learns from servants about Amit's first wife Poonam who died in mysterious circumstances about a year ago. The housekeeper Dai Maa, who was also the nanny of Poonam is visibly disturbed by this and is cold towards Rajeshwari. Amit leaves on a business trip for a few weeks and Rajeshwari is left to herself. This is when she encounters supernatural phenomena in the mansion and is haunted by the memories and spirit of Poonam. Recovering from shock, Rajeshwari decides to do her own investigation of Poonam's mysterious death. One by one she uncovers shocking dark secrets about Poonam, Amit and various other people.

== Cast ==
- Waheeda Rehman as Rajeshwari Singh
- Biswajeet as Raja Amit Kumar Singh
- Basanta Choudhury as Shekhar
- Lalita Pawar as Dai Maa
- Thelma as Poonam Devi
- Tarun Bose as Ramesh
- Madan Puri as Kamal Rai
- Manmohan Krishna as Kamal's Advocate
- Asit Sen as Goverdhan
- Badri Prasad
- Abhi Bhattacharya as Advocate Bhattacharya
- Sujit Kumar as Ranjan
- Keshto Mukherjee as the gardener
- Shaukat Azmi as Rai Sahib's wife
- Thelma

== Productions ==
The film was the second directorial venture of Biren Nag after the film Bees Saal Baad (1962). He had been art director of Guru Dutt productions such as Chaudhvin Ka Chand (1960), Sahib Bibi Aur Ghulam (1962) and CID (1956). The role of Poonam was played by Thelma, an Anglo-Indian actress, who did small roles in film.

The scene of the first wife's room, an all white set was built at Rajkamal Kalamandir in Mumbai. The song, "Raah bani khud manzil" was filmed on winding road to Mahabaleshwar, a hill station in Maharashtra.

== Music ==
Music: Hemant Kumar; Lyrics: Kaifi Azmi

- "Yeh Nayan Dare Dare" - Hemant Kumar
- "Rah Bani Khud Manzil" - Hemant Kumar (Pilu (raga))
- "O Beqarar Dil" - Lata Mangeshkar (Raga Bhimpalasi)
- "Jhoom Jhoom Dhalti Raat" (version 1) - Lata Mangeshkar (Raga Kamod Kalyan)
- "Jhoom Jhoom Dhalti Raat" (version 2) - Lata Mangeshkar (Raga Kamod Kalyan)
- "Kahe Bajayi Tune Paani Bansuriya" - Mahendra Kapoor, Asha Bhosle

== Awards ==
1. Filmfare Nomination for Best Actress in a Supporting Role - Lalita Pawar
2. Filmfare Award for Best Art Direction for Black-and-White film category - G. L. Yadhav & T. K. Desai
