= Kaun Apna Kaun Paraya =

- Directed by: Niranjan
- Starring: Paidi Jairaj; Waheeda Rehman; Nirupa Roy; Johnny Walker; Indira Bansal; Dingoo
- Music by: Ravi
- Release date: 1963

Kaun Apna Kaun Paraya (lit. 'Who is Family, Who is an Outsider') is a 1963 Hindi film starring Waheeda Rehman in the lead role. After a shipwreck, a woman adopts a boy who survived the disaster just like her. He grows up to become an engineer and is all set to marry his boss's daughter, when his real mother enters the picture.

== Soundtrack ==
All lyrics by Shakeel Badayuni.

#	Song	Singer	Raga
1	"Kaun Apna, Kaun Paraya"	Mohammed Rafi	
2	"Zara Sun Haseena, Ae Naazneen"	Mohammed Rafi	Pahadi
3	"Aashiq Hoon, Apne Pyar Ke Johar"	Mohammed Rafi	
4	"Zindagibhar Yahi Ikraar Kiye Jayenge"	Asha Bhosle, Mohammed Rafi	
5	"Allah Kare, Main Bhi Dulhan Ban Jaun"	Asha Bhosle, Shamshad Begum	
6	"Aaya Bahar Ka Zamana"	Asha Bhosle	
