= Anindita Ghosh =

British historian of Indian origin

Anindita Ghosh FRHS is a British historian, and Professor of Modern Indian History at the University of Manchester.

Ghosh was born in India. She was educated at New Delhi, India (MA), and earned a PHD from the University of Cambridge.

Ghosh joined the University of Manchester in 2001. She is a Fellow of the Royal Historical Society.
