= Waheeda Rehman =

Indian actress (born 1938)

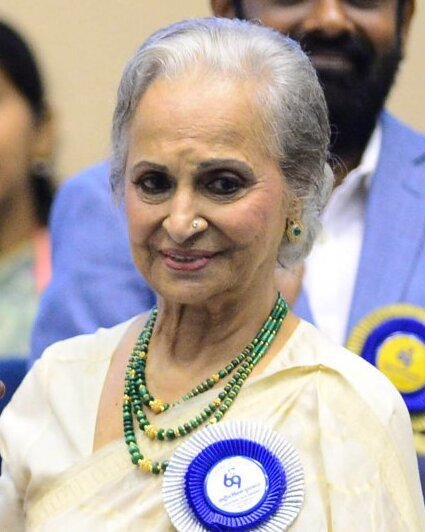
- Rehman in 2023
- Born: 3 February 1938 (age 88); Chengalpet, Madras Presidency, British India (present-day Tamil Nadu, India)
- Occupation: Actress
- Years active: 1955–present
- Works: Full list
- Spouse: Shashi Rekhi (m. 1974; died 2000)
- Children: 2

Signature
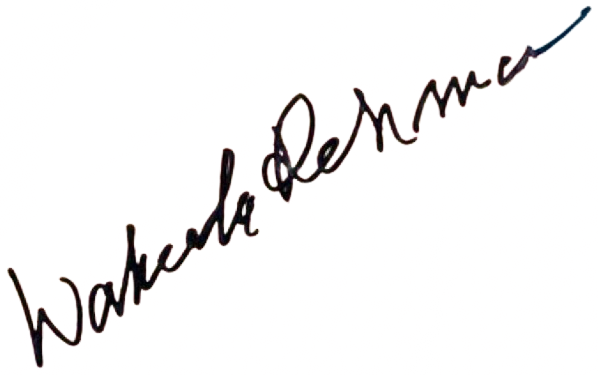

Waheeda Rehman (born 3 February 1938) is an Indian actress. Regarded as one of the greatest and most accomplished actresses of Hindi cinema, she has appeared in more than 90 feature films, in a career spanning over five decades. Her accolades include a National Film Award and three Filmfare Awards. She was honoured with India's civilian awards, the Padma Shri in 1972 and the Padma Bhushan in 2011. In 2021 she was honoured with the Dadasaheb Phalke Award, India's highest award in the field of cinema.

Rehman made her acting debut with the Telugu film Rojulu Marayi (1955). She rose to prominence by her collaborations with Hindi filmmaker Guru Dutt in the dramas Pyaasa (1957), Kaagaz Ke Phool (1959), Chaudhvin Ka Chand (1960), and Sahib Bibi Aur Ghulam (1962). She received widespread critical acclaim for the romantic drama Guide (1965), for which she won her first Filmfare Award for Best Actress. She won the award again for her performance in the romantic thriller Neel Kamal (1968), and additionally earned nominations for her roles in the comedy Ram Aur Shyam (1967) and the drama Khamoshi (1969). For portraying a clanswoman in the crime drama Reshma Aur Shera (1971), she won the National Film Award for Best Actress.

Since the 1970s, Rehman has worked primarily in supporting roles, appearing in Yash Chopra's romantic dramas Kabhie Kabhie (1976), Chandni (1989) and Lamhe (1991), and action films Trishul (1978) and Mashaal (1984). Her other notable supporting roles were in the films Namkeen and Namak Halaal in 1982. In 1994, she was honoured with the Filmfare Lifetime Achievement Award. Following a hiatus, she has worked intermittently, appearing in the social dramas Water (2005), Rang De Basanti (2006) and Delhi 6 (2009).

Apart from her acting career, Rehman is a philanthropist. She is an advocate for education and is an ambassador for RangDe, an organisation combating poverty in India.

== Early life ==
Waheeda Rehman was born on 3 February 1938 to a Deccani speaking Muslim family in Chengalpet of present-day Tamil Nadu, India. Her father was Mohammed Abdur Rehman and her mother was Mumtaz Begum, and she was the youngest out of four daughters. As a child, she and her sisters were trained in Bharatanatyam in Chennai. She studied in St. Joseph's Convent in Visakhapatnam when her father was posted there in the then-Madras Presidency. Her father, who worked as a district commissioner, died in 1951 while she was in her early teens.

Rehman's dream was to become a doctor, but due to her family's circumstances emotionally and financially, alongside her mother's illness, she abandoned her goal. In order to help her family, she accepted movie offers that stemmed from her dancing abilities.

== Acting career ==
=== Beginnings and breakthrough ===
Rehman made her film debut with the Tamil film Alibabavum 40 Thirudargalum as a dancer. However, the Telugu film Rojulu Marayi (1955) released prior to that; where she again performed in a dance. The same year, she also played the lead role opposite N. T. Rama Rao in the film Jayasimha. Subsequently, her cameo appearance in Alibabavum 40 Thirudargalum released in 1956. Based on the folktale Ali Baba and the Forty Thieves, it was the first Tamil film to be colourised. In the mid-1950s, she established a working relationship with Dev Anand wherein they had a number of successful films to their credit which include Solva Saal (1958). Suresh Kohli of The Hindu writes on her performance in Solva Saal; "Though barely 20 then and only in her fourth Hindi release, Rehman demonstrates her class: both in serious scenes demanding intensity and through sparkling, mischievous eye movements during lighter moments."

==== Collaborations with Guru Dutt ====
Rehman's performances caught the eye of Hindi filmmaker Guru Dutt, whom she considered her mentor. Dutt brought her to Bombay (present-day Mumbai) and cast her as Kamini in the crime thriller C.I.D. (1956). Because of the trend set of the then popular actresses such as Madhubala, Nargis and Meena Kumari, Waheeda was asked to use a stage name, reasoning that her name should be "something sexy", which she refused and continued with her birth name. Dutt would next cast her in her first lead role in Hindi films in the drama Pyaasa (1957), where she portrayed a prostitute. The film was a commercial success, and it has been regarded by critics as one of the greatest films ever made. She continued collaborations with Dutt which include the noir film 12 O'Clock (1958), the romantic drama Kaagaz Ke Phool (1959), and the Muslim social film Chaudhvin Ka Chand (1960); all of which earned her critical praise. Rehman and Dutt's last collaboration was the romantic drama Sahib Bibi Aur Ghulam (1962), which starred Dutt, Meena Kumari, and Rehman herself in a supporting role. The film was a major success, being lauded by both Indian and international critics. This earned Rehman her first Filmfare nomination in the category of Best Supporting Actress, meanwhile the film itself received nominations for the Golden Bear at the 13th Berlin International Film Festival and won the Filmfare Award for Best Film.

=== Widespread success ===
The actress next ventured into Bengali film-making with Satyajit Ray's film Abhijan (1962). Following this, she played a murder suspect in Baat Ek Raat Ki (1962), a girl embroiled in a sibling feud in Rakhi (1962) and an infertile woman in Ek Dil Sau Afsane (1963). As a leading lady, she was cast opposite many familiar faces of Hindi Cinema; notably, this includes Sunil Dutt in Mujhe Jeene Do (1962), Nirupa Roy in Kaun Apna Kaun Paraya (1963) and Biswajit in the horror film Kohraa (1964), the drama Majboor (1964), and the psychological-thriller Bees Saal Baad (1962)—the latter becoming the highest-grossing Hindi film of 1962. At the end of 1964, Rehman became the third-highest paid actress in Hindi films.

==== Guide (1965) ====
Vijay Anand's magnum opus, the romantic drama Guide (1965) was an adaptation of the same book written by R. K. Narayan, published in 1958. Rehman starred as Rosie, a rebellious, strong-willed wife of an unfaithful archaeologist. She stated that the role proved difficult for her, particularly because it broke several film stereotypes at the time. Guide was a major commercial success, emerging as the fifth-highest grossing Hindi film of 1965, and it opened to widespread critical acclaim, with Rehman's performance receiving universal praise. Trisha Gupta of Hindustan Times writing, "Rosie was triply unusual: a woman who walks out of an unhappy marriage, begins a romantic relationship with a man who isn't her husband, and simultaneously embarks on a successful career as a dancer. She would be an unusual Hindi film heroine even today..." and ranked her performance amongst Indian cinema's greatest. For her performance, Rehman won her first Filmfare Award for Best Actress, and Guide went on to win the National Film Award for Best Feature Film and the Filmfare Award for Best Film. It became India's official entry to the Oscars, though it did not get nominated. It is now considered a cult classic, and is considered Rehman's signature film performance.

==== Continued success ====
Rehman's career peak continued when she was paired with other well-established superstars, namely Dilip Kumar, Rajendra Kumar, Raj Kapoor, and Rajesh Khanna. Among her most acclaimed films of the late 1960s include Teesri Kasam (1966), which won the National Film Award for Best Feature Film, Ram Aur Shyam (1967), Neel Kamal (1968) and Khamoshi (1969). The last three films earned Rehman consecutive nominations for the Filmfare Award for Best Actress, winning her second award for Neel Kamal. In her highly praised role in Khamoshi starring alongside Rajesh Khanna and Dharmendra, she plays a nurse who goes mentally insane after falling in love with one of her patients, and eventually is sent to her own mental institution. Other commercial successes of this period were Patthar Ke Sanam (1967) and Aadmi (1968). At the end of the 1960s, Rehman ranked a new record amongst herself in becoming the second-paid actress in Hindi films, from 1964 to 1969. She states herself, "For Solva Saal, my first film as a freelancer, I received ₹30,000. The highest I ever earned in my career was Rs. 7 lakh for a film."

==== Reshma Aur Shera (1971) ====
For headlining Sunil Dutt's film Reshma Aur Shera (1971), Rehman won the National Film Award for Best Actress, which is India's equivalent to the Academy Award for Best Actress. Reshma Aur Shera earned critical appreciation, Dutt was nominated for the Golden Bear at the 22nd Berlin International Film Festival and was selected as the Indian entry for the Best Foreign Language Film, but the film failed at the box office.

=== Later roles and sporadic work ===
Rehman began experimenting with roles at this stage of career. She accepted the offer to play a mother to Jaya Bhaduri in Phagun (1973). In her new innings from the '70s, her successful films include Kabhi Kabhie (1976), Trishul (1978), Jwalamukhi (1980), Naseeb (1981), Namkeen (1982), Dharam Kanta (1982), Namak Halaal (1982), Coolie (1983), Mashaal (1984), Chandni (1989) and Lamhe (1991). Kabhi Kabhie, Namkeen, Chandni and Lamhe garnered her nominations for the Filmfare Award for Best Supporting Actress. Film expert Rajesh Subramanian reported that Manmohan Desai had approached Rehman, on behalf of Shammi Kapoor, during the making of Naseeb. In the song "John Jani Janardhan", Kapoor and Rehman make a grand-entry holding hands. Incidentally, this was the first time the two stars appeared together on screen. After her appearance in Lamhe, she announced a sabbatical from the film industry.

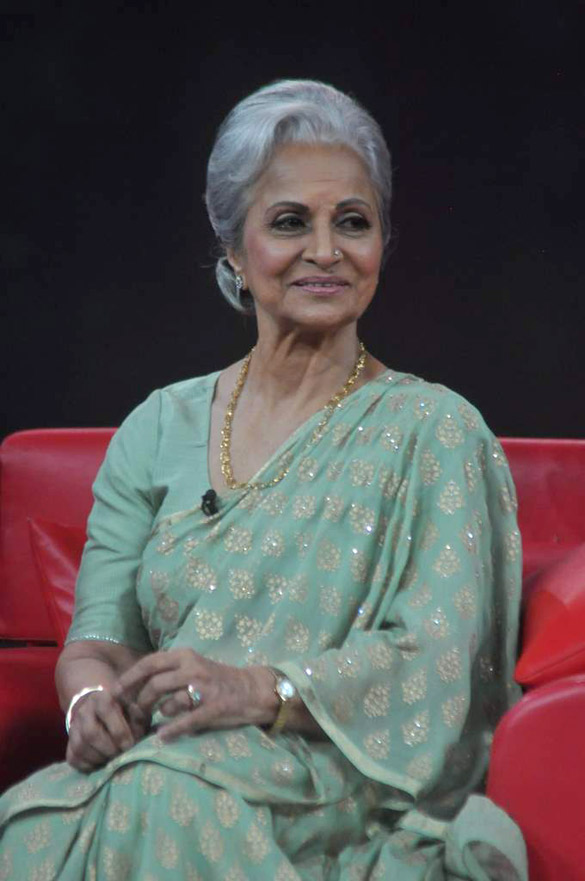
Rehman in 2012

Initially, Rehman was supposed to play the role of her frequent co-star Amitabh Bachchan's mother in Karan Johar's ensemble family drama Kabhi Khushi Kabhie Gham (2001). However, after having shot a few scenes, she dropped out of the film due to her husband's death in November 2000; subsequently, her role was then played by Achala Sachdev. In recent years, she has played motherly roles in Om Jai Jagadish (2002), Water (2005), 15 Park Avenue (2005), Rang De Basanti (2006) and Delhi 6 (2009), all of which earned her critical acclaim.

In 2011, she was honoured by the Government of India with the Padma Bhushan, and in 2013 with the Cenetary Award for Indian Film Personality for her contribution to Indian Cinema. A biography has been written and published in 2014 about Rehman, entitled Conversations With Waheeda Rehman, which consist of interviews collected by author and director Nasreen Munni Kabir.

== Personal life ==
In April 1974, Waheeda married Shashi Rekhi (also known by his screen name Kamaljeet). They had worked together in the film Shagoon (1964). They had two children, Daughter Kashvi and son Sohail. After her marriage, they lived in a farmhouse in Bangalore but after Rekhi's death on 21 November 2000, Waheeda moved back to Bandra, Mumbai, where she currently lives.

She is private about her life and seldom speaks about it, as said in an interview at the launch of Conversations with Waheeda Rehman: "I don't want to get into it. My private life should remain private. It is nobody's business. I know we are public figures, so when I fight with my husband, do you want to know about it?"

== Artistry and legacy ==
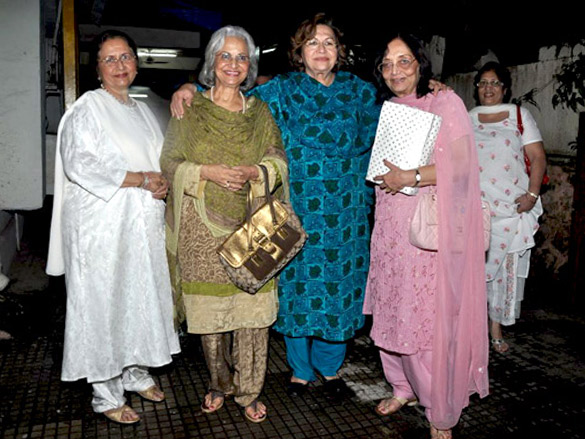
Rehman (second from left) with Nanda, Helen and Sadhana in 2010

Rehman is regarded as one of the greatest actors of Indian cinema. Rediff.com placed her in their "Bollywood's Best Actresses of all time" list. In 2022, she was placed in Outlook India's "75 Best Bollywood Actresses" list. One of the highest paid actress of mid- to late 1960s and early 1970s, Rehman appeared in Box Office India's "Top Actresses" list from 1958 to 1963 and again topeed the list from 1967 to 1972. Rehman was placed 3rd in Rediff.com's "Best Bollywood Debut Ever" list, for her film CID. In 2011, they listed her as the fifth-greatest actress of all-time after Nargis, Smita Patil, Nutan and Meena Kumari. In 2012, Rehman was placed 9th by NDTV in its "The Most Popular Actress of All Time" list. Filmfare included Rehman's performances in Guide in its list of Bollywood's "80 Iconic Performances". Rehman was also placed in Times of India's "50 Beautiful Faces" list.

Devesh Sharma of Filmfare termed her "dusky danseuse". Arushi Bhaskar of Indian Express said, "Waheeda Rehman has a rich filmography to her name that reflects the changing ethos of Indian cinema as well as her own talents." Sharla Bazliel of India Today noted, "Her name means "the unique one" and few actors have had a career, and life, quite like Waheeda Rehman." Mukul Kesavan of The Telegraph talked about her work with Guru Dutt and said, "Waheeda Rehman is Hindi cinema's greatest actor but it is a mistake to make that claim, as often happens, on the basis of her work in Guru Dutt's films. Guru Dutt sprinkled her with stardust; as an actor, she made herself." Dinesh Raheja of Rediff.com noted, "Rehman's simple beauty and refreshingly natural style of acting gave her an edge over the carefully-lacquered bouffant brigade of the 1960s." In 2022, actress Paoli Dam recreated her look from Pyaasa (1957), on the occasion of 75 years of Independence.

== Awards and honours ==
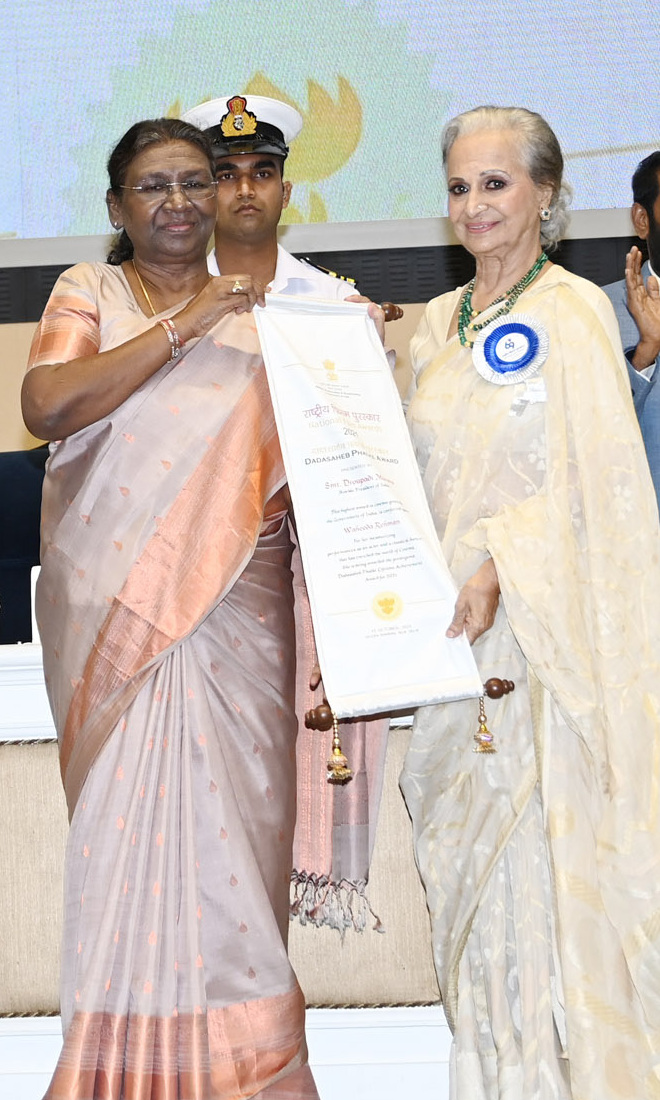
President Murmu presenting the Dadasaheb Phalke Award to Rehman at the 69th National Film Awards

Year	Film	Award	Category	Result	Ref.
1962	Sahib Bibi Aur Ghulam	Filmfare Awards	Best Supporting Actress	Nominated	
1965	Guide	Filmfare Awards	Best Actress	Won	
1965	Guide	Chicago International Film Festival	Best Actress	Won	
1966	Teesri Kasam	BFJA Awards	Best Actress (Hindi)	Won	
1967	Ram Aur Shyam	Filmfare Awards	Best Actress	Nominated	
1968	Neel Kamal	Filmfare Awards	Best Actress	Won	
1970	Khamoshi	Filmfare Awards	Best Actress	Nominated	
1971	Reshma Aur Shera	National Film Awards	Best Actress	Won	
1976	Kabhi Kabhie	Filmfare Awards	Best Supporting Actress	Nominated	
1982	Namkeen	Filmfare Awards	Best Supporting Actress	Nominated	
1989	Chandni	Filmfare Awards	Best Supporting Actress	Nominated	
1991	Lamhe	Filmfare Awards	Best Supporting Actress	Nominated	

=== Honours ===
- Padma Shri in 1972.
- Filmfare Lifetime Achievement Award in 1994.
- IIFA Lifetime Achievement Award in 2001.
- NTR National Award in 2006.
- Padma Bhushan in 2011.

Centenary award for best film personality 2013

- Rashtriya Kishore Kumar Samman from the Government of Madhya Pradesh in 2020.
- Dadasaheb Phalke Award: India's highest award for cinematic excellence for the year 2021, awarded in 2023 at the 69th National Film Awards.

== Sources ==
- Gulzar; Nihalani, Govind; Chatterjee, Saibal (2003). Encyclopaedia of Hindi Cinema. Popular Prakashan. ISBN 81-7991-066-0.
