= Bees Saal Baad (1962 film) =

1962 film

- Directed by: Biren Nag
- Written by: Devkishen (dialogue)
- Screenplay by: Dhruva Chatterjee
- Based on: The Hound of the Baskervilles by Arthur Conan Doyle, Nishithini Bivishika (novel) by Hemendra Kumar Roy
- Produced by: Hemant Kumar
- Starring: Biswajeet; Waheeda Rehman; Madan Puri; Asit Sen
- Cinematography: Marshall Braganza
- Edited by: Keshav Nanda
- Music by: Hemant Kumar
- Production company: Geetanjali Pictures
- Distributed by: Geetanjali Pictures
- Release date: 1 January 1962
- Country: India
- Language: Hindi
- Box office: ₹30 million

Bees Saal Baad (Hindi: बीस साल बाद, transl. Twenty Years Later) is a 1962 Indian Hindi-language psychological thriller film. It was directed by Biren Nag and produced by Hemant Kumar, who also composed the music and sang some of the songs. The film marks the directorial debut of Biren Nag, and stars Biswajeet (this was his first Hindi film), Waheeda Rehman, Madan Puri, Sajjan and Asit Sen.

The film is a remake of the 1951 Bengali thriller Jighansa, which itself is based on Arthur Conan Doyle's The Hound of the Baskervilles as well as loosely based on Hemendra Kumar Roy's novel Nishithini Bivishika. The film topped the box office chart in 1962, becoming a "super hit." The film became very popular for the song "Kahin Deep Jale", sung by Lata Mangeshkar and written by Shakeel Badayuni for which they won Filmfare Award for Best Female Playback Singer and Filmfare Award for Best Lyricist respectively.

== Plot ==
After a lustful Thakur in the village of Chandanghat rapes a young girl, she kills herself. Thereafter, the Thakur is killed by what the local people call the girl's vengeful spirit. Then the Thakur's son is also reportedly killed by the same spirit. Twenty years after the Thakur's death, his grandson Kumar comes to the village and is warned by the locals that the spirit will kill him as well, but he does not believe them. He hears the singing voice of the supposed spirit the first night from the swamp. The next day as he wakes up, he finds out about Radha, a carefree girl who is the niece of an old man, Ramlal.

The singing continues the second night, but Kumar is unable to find the identity of the girl singing the song. He notices that there is a source of light in his house on the terrace. The next day, Kumar finds that his coat is lost. The news reaches Radha that Kumar has been killed. Radha does not believe this and runs into the forest, and Kumar appears before her. He says it was not he that was killed, but another man wearing his suit. He was killed in the swamp under the same tree where his father and grandfather were killed.

Later that night, Kumar sees Laxman, his servant, arguing with a girl. When he inquires, Laxman explains that the man who was killed under the tree was none other than his sister's husband. Laxman used to give a signal from the roof (terrace) of the house occasionally to his fugitive brother-in-law, using the light from his lantern, after which that man would come to the house for supplies. Since the fugitive needed a coat, Laxman stole Kumar's coat and gave it to him. Obviously, the "spirit" had chanced upon the fugitive in the forest, mistaken him for Kumar, and killed him. Radha strongly urges Kumar to leave the village and go back to town, since a person wearing his coat was killed by the spirit, but Kumar refuses to leave.

Ramlal forbids his niece Radha to meet Kumar, since tongues in the village have begun to wag. Also, says Ramlal, Kumar is the grandson of a rapist and two generations of his family have met violent deaths; Kumar himself has been marked by the spirit. Why get involved with him? Radha is deeply saddened after this conversation with her uncle. Seeing Radha so downcast, Ramlal tells her to call Kumar near the swamp where they will talk, and he will convince Kumar to leave the village. Kumar goes to the swamp, and the spirit tries to kill him, but he escapes. Radha finds out that the one who was pretending to be the spirit of the girl was none other than her uncle Ramlal. It was Ramlal's daughter who had been raped by Thakur, so he killed Thakur and Thakur's son and was trying to kill Thakur's grandson. Police arrive and persuade Ramlal to surrender himself. Kumar and Radha meet each other and have a happy ending.

== Cast ==
- Biswajeet Chatterjee as Kumar Vijay Singh
- Waheeda Rehman as Radha
- Manmohan Krishna as Ramlal / Radheshyam
- Madan Puri as Dr. Pandey
- Asit Sen as Gopichand Jasoos
- Sajjan as Detective Mohan Tripathi
- Lata Sinha
- Dev Kishan as Laxman

== Soundtrack ==
The music was composed by Hemant Kumar.

- "Bekarar Karke Hume" - Hemant Kumar
- "Kahin Deep Jale Kahin Dil" - Lata Mangeshkar (Raga Shivaranjani)
- "Sapne Suhane" - Lata Mangeshkar
- "Yeh Mohabbat Mein" - Lata Mangeshkar
- "Zara Nazaron Se Kah Do Ji" - Hemant Kumar

== Awards and nominations ==
Filmfare Awards

- Best Lyricist - Shakeel Badayuni for the song "Kahin Deep Jale Kahin Dil"
- Best Female Playback Singer - Lata Mangeshkar for the song "Kahin Deep Jale Kahin Dil"
- Best Editing - Keshav Nanda
- Best Sound Design - S. Y. Pathak

Nominations

- Best Film
- Best Director - Biren Nag
- Best Music Director - Hemant Kumar
