= Ten Years with Guru Dutt =

Biography by Sathya Saran

- Cover of the 2008 edition
- Author: Sathya Saran
- Language: English
- Subject: Guru Dutt
- Genre: Biography
- Published: 25 July 2008
- Publisher: Penguin Group
- Publication place: India
- Media type: Print
- Pages: 216
- ISBN: 978-01-43416-92-0
- OCLC: 261202989

Ten Years with Guru Dutt is a biography of Indian filmmaker Guru Dutt that was written by journalist Sathya Saran. It is based on Saran's conversations with the screenwriter Abrar Alvi about Dutt and Alvi's collaborations, which began when they met on the sets of Baaz (1953) and ended with Dutt's death in 1964. This information was compiled into a 23-chapter book with first-person narrative interspersed with Saran's commentary. Penguin Group published Ten Years with Guru Dutt on 25 July 2008.

Saran started conceiving ideas for the book after reading an Indian Express interview of Alvi about Dutt in 2003. At the end of the article, the interviewer noted there were many untold stories and challenged readers who wanted to listen to them. Consequently, Saran met Alvi between 2004 and 2007 at Alvi's apartment in Andheri with the intent of writing a series of articles, which were later developed into a book.

Upon its publication, the book was declared a commercial success and received acclaim from critics, who said its most interesting parts were those covering the production of the 1962 film Sahib Bibi Aur Ghulam, that both Dutt and Alvi worked on. Critics also highlighted Saran's writing for its simplicity and clarity and for providing informative commentary. In 2012, Ten Years with Guru Dutt was adapted into a stage play of the same name, which also generated positive reviews for its performances and costume designs.

== Summary ==
Ten Years with Guru Dutt is a biography of the filmmaker Guru Dutt that is based on journalist Sathya Saran's conversations with the screenwriter Abrar Alvi. The book has 23 chapters, whose titles are taken from well-known lines in Dutt's films' songs. The book is in first-person narrative and is interspersed with Saran's commentary. The book starts with Saran's introduction about her writing process, which is followed by remembrances of Dutt's death on 10 October 1964. It later chronicles Dutt and Alvi's collaborations, which started with their meeting on the sets of Baaz (1953). The book also details their joint works; Aar Paar (1954), Mr. & Mrs. '55 (1955), Pyaasa (1957), Kaagaz Ke Phool (1959), Chaudhvin Ka Chand (1960), Sahib Bibi Aur Ghulam (1962), and Baharen Phir Bhi Aayengi (1966).

== Background and writing ==
Before she released Ten Years with Guru Dutt, Sathya Saran was the editor of the women's magazine Femina and a Daily News and Analysis supplement. In 2003, she was reading an interview of the screenwriter Abrar Alvi in The Indian Express, recollecting his collaborations with the filmmaker Guru Dutt up to a few days before Dutt's death in 1964. At the end of the article, the interviewer concluded there were still many stories untold and challenged readers who wanted to listen to them. Having been fascinated by Dutt, she was motivated to do so and wrote in the book's foreword; "I was at the time going through a rough patch emotionally, thanks to matters at the workplace turning sour. This, I told myself, would distract me, keep me from feeling that my journalistic job was the beginning and the end of the world."

Saran originally intended to write a series of articles, which she developed into a book after meeting Abrar Alvi in Mumbai in 2004. Alvi was initially reluctant to discuss Dutt but changed his mind after finding out he knew Saran's husband's cousins. Saran described Alvi as being in poor health when she first met him but spoke positively of his complex personality; "He would say [he is] getting senile but he can remember things with ease. Sometimes, he would get agitated. Sometimes, he would get animated and would perform. So it was a lot of fun." They met once a week at Alvi's apartment in Andheri, Mumbai. The writing ended in 2007.

== Release and reception ==
Ten Years with Guru Dutt was released as a hardcover book by Penguin Group on 25 July 2008, and was a commercial success. Penguin Books reissued the book in 2011 and 2020, both in the hardcover format; the 2020 edition was released with a new cover. A Hindi-language version was published in 2012.

Savitha Gautam of The Hindu complimented Saran's effective writing and said the most interesting parts are those on the production of Sahib Bibi Aur Ghulam. Gautam added; "The book may not unravel the mystery that was Guru Dutt. But it paints a picture of creative partnership, which resulted in an invaluable contribution to Hindi cinema." According to Madhu Jain of The Book Review:

Settling-of-score books can be entertaining, vindictive, or just plain boring ... Abrar Alvi's account of a decade of working with legendary film director-actor Guru Dutt could have been fascinating if only the raison d'être of this book had not been to establish and iterate the fact ad infinitum that he and not ... Dutt held the director's baton for ... Sahib Bibi Aur Ghulam.

Writing for the Hindustan Times, Amita Malik described information relating to Dutt's death as the book's "most poignant anecdote", saying the photographs are among the book's best parts. Baradwaj Rangan of The New Indian Express wrote: "The thing about someone else's story is that there's no real way of arriving at the veracity of the chapters, at the truth of the characters, and the best recourse, sometimes, is to let this teller himself tell the story ... The effect is that of thumbing through the very entertaining transcript of a those-were-the-days interview, laden with nostalgic nuggets as much about a bygone age of living as a bygone era of filmmaking". Kaveree Bamzai of India Today said the book's contents focus primarily on Sahib Bibi Aur Ghulam, which according to her makes the book "absorbing reading".

In a review for The Tribune, Nonika Singh took note of the fluidity and lucidity in Saran's writing, her initiative of presenting the story in first-person narrative, and her commentary. In The Punch Magazine, filmmaker Muzaffar Ali said through this book, Saran proves her journalistic ability; he also said; "She has gone into the essence of two interdependent personalities and created a magic of human drama which is very imaginative, informative and at the same time proactive ... she has woven an evocative past that will be a milestone in Bollywood history. A sense of record being lost to time." Deccan Herald referred to Ten Years with Guru Dutt as the finest book on an Indian personality. The author Yasser Usman commended it as "a warm and insightful look at two remarkable artistes who inspired each other to create movie magic".

== Adaptations ==
A 90-minute, English- and Hindi-language, black-and-white stage adaptation was held at Prithvi Theatre, Juhu, on 20 and 21 November 2012. Saattvic directed the work in his debut and starred as a younger Alvi alongside Dilnaz Irani as a journalist, Namit as an older Alvi, Tariq Vasudeva as Dutt, Dhruv Lohumi, Manasi Rachh as Waheeda Rehman, and Maanvi Gagroo as Meena Kumari. Sabyasachi Mukherjee and Raghavendra Rathore designed the costumes. The book's original story was slightly changed; the director was quoted as saying, "I had to keep all the characters' looks in mind and I was very cautious about the way the actors enacted the parts". Neha Das of Deccan Herald praised the play for highlighting important points in Dutt's life. The Times of India said the actors delivered commendable performances and commented on how the costumes enhanced the play.
