= Kaagaz Ke Phool: The Original Screenplay =

Book by Dinesh Raheja and Jitendra Kothari

- Author: Dinesh Raheja; Jitendra Kothari
- Language: English; Hindi
- Subject: Kaagaz Ke Phool
- Published: 2014
- Publisher: Om Books International
- Publication place: India
- Media type: Print
- Pages: 254
- ISBN: 978-93-80070-99-5
- OCLC: 889861415

Kaagaz Ke Phool: The Original Screenplay is a 2014 book by the journalist Dinesh Raheja and the film archivist-cum-historian Jitendra Kothari. It contains original screenplay—in Hindi and English—for the 1959 romantic drama Kaagaz Ke Phool, along with interviews of the film's cast and crew team with the authors, speaking of their roles in the film and their experiences during the shooting. Released by Om Books International, Kaagaz Ke Phool: The Original Screenplay was positively reviewed by book critics.

== Development and release ==
The book marked the journalist Dinesh Raheja and the film archivist Jitendra Kothari's fifth collaborations. They had previously written the books on Bollywood: 1996's The Hundred Luminaries of Hindi Cinema, 2004's The Bollywood Saga, 2012's Sahib Bibi Aur Ghulam: The Original Screenplay, and 2014's Chaudhvin Ka Chand: The Original Screenplay. Kaagaz Ke Phool: The Original Screenplay contains the original screenplay—in Hindi and its English translation—for the 1959 romantic drama Kaagaz Ke Phool, as well as their interviews with the living cast and crew, and the authors' commentary on the film. Directed and produced by Guru Dutt, Kaagaz Ke Phool stars Dutt and Waheeda Rehman.

The book was published in 2014 by Om Books International. Writing for The Book Review, Radhya Dayal described Kaagaz Ke Phool as one of "Bombay cinema's most enigmatic films" and said the book "attempts to recreate the magic and cinematic enigma of the film by adopting, primarily, a literary lens that focuses on the film’s screenplay." The Hindu's critic wrote, "Besides archiving the screenplay of this classic, this book also incorporates insightful interviews ... In an essay, authors Dinesh Raheja and Jitendra Kothari deliberate on how the film’s fate ironically reflects Dutt’s ever-evolving relationship with fame." Bollywood Hungama concluded, "It is this endeavor to extract truth and many other anecdotes around one of the finest works of Guru Dutt that makes this ... book an interesting read."

== Sources ==
- "Book review – Kaagaz Ke Phool – The Original Screenplay". Bollywood Hungama. 1 July 2014. Archived from the original on 5 September 2021.
- Dayal, Radha (February 2015). "Reversing cinematic translation". The Book Review. 39 (2). Archived from the original on 10 September 2021.
- "Fading light". The Hindu. 18 August 2014. Archived from the original on 10 September 2021.
- Kaagaz Ke Phool: The Original Screenplay Paperback – 1 January 2014. 1 January 2014. ASIN 9380070993.
- Kumar, Anuj (1 June 2012). "The legend endures". The Hindu. Archived from the original on 17 July 2021.
- Tejuja, Vivek (21 April 2014). "'Chaudhvin Ka Chand' is a comment on male friendship". News18. Archived from the original on 19 July 2021.
- Raheja, Dinesh; Kothari, Jitendra (1 October 2004). The Bollywood Saga. ISBN 8174362851.
- Raheja, Dinesh; Kothari, Jitendra (10 January 1996). The Hundred Luminaries of Hindi Cinema Paperback – January 10, 1996. ISBN 8175080078.
