= Chaudhvin Ka Chand: The Original Screenplay =

Book by Dinesh Raheja and Jitendra Kothari

- Author: Dinesh Raheja; Jitendra Kothari
- Language: English; Hindi
- Subject: Chaudhvin Ka Chand
- Published: 2014
- Publisher: Om Books International
- Publication place: India
- Media type: Print
- Pages: 251
- ISBN: 978-93-80070-98-8

Chaudhvin Ka Chand: The Original Screenplay is a 2014 book that was written by the journalist Dinesh Raheja and the film archivist Jitendra Kothari. It contains the original screenplay—in original Hindi and its English translation—for the 1960 romantic drama Chaudhvin Ka Chand, along with interviews of the film's cast and crew team with the authors, speaking of their roles in the film and their experiences during the production. Upon release, the book was met with positive reviews from critics.

== Development and release ==
The book marked the journalist Dinesh Raheja and the film archivist Jitendra Kothari's fourth collaborations, having previously written 1996's The Hundred Luminaries of Hindi Cinema, 2004's The Bollywood Saga, and 2012's Sahib Bibi Aur Ghulam: The Original Screenplay. Chaudhvin Ka Chand: The Original Screenplay contains the original screenplay—in Hindi and its English translation—for the 1960 romantic drama Chaudhvin Ka Chand, as well as their interviews with the living cast and crew, and the authors' commentary on the film. In an interview with Daily News and Analysis, Raheja said of the book's writing: "They gave me a rough screenplay, which they must have salvaged. But in those days there was no leather bound script. There are minimum instructions in it and the scene changed several times. So, I saw the film at least 40–50 times."

The book was published in 2014 by Om Books International, and critics were appreciative of it. In an anonymous review in the entertainment portal Bollywood Hungama, "... it must be added that this Muslim social from 1960 could well interest a very select set of readers for whom the book would strictly serve academic purposes. For such students of Indian cinema, the book could well turn out to be an educational pick." Siddhi Pathak from The Indian Express wrote, "The book resonates the charisma and creativity of the legend, Guru Dutt. It successfully makes you relive the film on paper. For any film-amigo or cinema enthusiast, it's an absolute insightful delight." Vivek Tejuja of News18 described the book as a "delight to read", adding, "The commentary and extended analysis are a treat in this book to watch out for."

== Sources ==
- "Book rack..." Deccan Herald. 5 April 2014. Archived from the original on 10 April 2014.
- "Book review – Chaudhvin Ka Chand – The Original Screenplay". Bollywood Hungama. 4 April 2014. Archived from the original on 11 September 2021.
- Pathak, Siddhi (18 April 2014). "Classic re-visited". The Indian Express. Archived from the original on 17 July 2014.
- Tejuja, Vivek (21 April 2014). "'Chaudhvin Ka Chand' is a comment on male friendship". News18. Archived from the original on 19 July 2021.
- Unnikrishnan, Chaya (2 April 2014). "Chaudhvin Ka Chand laid the seed for bromance in films: Dinesh Raheja". Daily News and Analysis. Archived from the original on 11 November 2020.
