= Sahib Bibi Aur Ghulam: The Original Screenplay =

Book by Dinesh Raheja and Jitendra Kothari

- Author: Dinesh Raheja; Jitendra Kothari
- Language: English; Hindi
- Subject: Sahib Bibi Aur Ghulam
- Published: 2012
- Publisher: Om Books International
- Publication place: India
- Media type: Print
- Pages: 201
- ISBN: 978-93-80069-86-9
- OCLC: 824536090

Sahib Bibi Aur Ghulam: The Original Screenplay is a 2012 book written by the journalist Dinesh Raheja and the film archivist-cum-historian Jitendra Kothari. It contains original screenplay—in Hindi and English—for the 1962 drama film Sahib Bibi Aur Ghulam, along with interviews of the film's cast and crew team with the authors, speaking of their roles in the film and their experiences during the shooting. Released by Om Books International, Sahib Bibi Aur Ghulam: The Original Screenplay was positively reviewed by book critics, praising the initiatives of the writers for publishing the film's screenplay as a book.

== Summary and release ==
The film journalist Dinesh Raheja along with the film archivist-historian Jitendra Kothari had worked together previously in 1996's The Hundred Luminaries of Hindi Cinema and 2004's The Bollywood Saga, making Sahib Bibi Aur Ghulam: The Original Screenplay their second collaboration. It contains screenplay for the 1962 drama Sahib Bibi Aur Ghulam, with interviews of the living cast and crew. Originally written in Hindi, the book also features its translation in English. Sahib Bibi Aur Ghulam was the first of three films—including Kaagaz Ke Phool (1959) and Chaudhvin Ka Chand (1960)—whose screenplay Raheja and Kothari they published as a book.

The book was published by Om Books International in early 2012 in the hardcover format, with an Amazon Kindle version was being released on 4 April the same year. Book critics were generally positive to it. Writing for The Hindu, Anuj Kumar, who described both Raheja and Kothari as "seasoned writers on cinema", said: "... the book lends the literary gravitas that the screenplay deserves and goes on to put things in perspective by adding points of view of people associated with the film." Mamun M. Adil from Dawn newspaper added that the book "is a worthy tribute to a classic film. One grouse, however, that one may have about this volume is that a single chapter has not been devoted solely to the film’s mesmerising soundtrack which formed the film's soul."

Piroj Wadia wrote a review of Sahib Bibi Aur Ghulam: The Original Screenplay for The Indian Express. In it, he complimented the authors for their efforts in translating the screenplay to English, observing, "It isn't easy to pick a classic film and write about it. It is also not easy to comment on it besides working on the script and also on the translation. Students studying filmmaking would be at a loss to watch a film and read the script as a study tool. In India, conservation is still a nascent activity and films are the worst hit. Hence, it indeed is a gift to the student fraternity and the cineaste alike when one reads [the book]." Hindustan Times's Roshmila Bhattacharya applauded the authors' initiatives, while Vivek Tuteja of News18 (in his review for Chaudhvin Ka Chand: The Original Screenplay in 2014) questioned why they wanted to make a book on the screenplay.
