= Dulhan Ek Raat Ki =

- Poster
- Directed by: D.D. Kashyap
- Written by: Satish Bhatnagar, D.D. Kashyap
- Based on: Tess of the D’Urbervilles by Thomas Hardy
- Produced by: M. Bhavani Singh
- Starring: Dharmendra; Nutan; Rehman
- Cinematography: Rajendra Malone
- Edited by: Anant Apte
- Music by: Madan Mohan
- Release date: 1967
- Country: India
- Language: Hindi

Dulhan Ek Raat Ki (transl. Bride for One Night) is a 1967 Indian Hindi-language film starring Dharmendra, Nutan and Rehman, the same trio who did Dil ne Phir Yaad Kiya. The film is based on the Thomas Hardy novel Tess of the d'Urbervilles.

== Plot ==
Ashok (Dharmendra) and Nirmala (Nutan) meet on a railway platform in Dehradun, and then consequently in town as well, and are attracted to each other. Nirmala discovers that her mother (Leela Chitnis) has mortgaged their house to pay for her education, so she gets a job as nurse to a wealthy blind woman (Mumtaz Begum). This woman has a son Ranjit (Rehman) who is also very attracted to Nirmala. She knows it, but does her best to keep him at arm's length. Then Ashok gets a job out of town. When he tells Nirmala, he gives her a bracelet and promises to come back for her soon. But after a party at her employer's home—against her better judgment—she accepts a ride with Ranjit and he rapes her. The bracelet from Ashok is lost and she is left on the cold ground. When she finds out that she is pregnant, her mother takes her out of town, where she gives birth to a still-born child. Meanwhile, Ashok's father has arranged his marriage with the daughter of a colleague. Ashok's friend Bansi (Johnny Walker) sabotages the marriage when the girl comes to visit (in a very funny scene) by insinuating that Ashok is an inveterate gambler. This enrages his father, and when Ashok says that he has promised another girl he would marry her, his father retorts that he has promised his friend. At his response, Ashok's father gets up and leaves without another word. When Nirmala and her mother return home, Nirmala gets a letter from two of her school friends. They are working in Mussoorie at a school, and think Nirmala can get a job teaching there too. She goes there and gets the job at the school. Her friends ask where she has been, and tell her that Ashok went to her house looking for her several times. Ashok is living in a camp in Mussoorie, working as an engineer. The girls and Bansi conspire to reunite them. Ashok is overjoyed to see Nirmala, but of course she has changed. He asks her to marry him; she refuses at first, then says that she will give him her answer in a week and throws herself into his arms, weeping. After some thought, she writes him a letter explaining all that has happened in the past year, leaves it at his camp, and goes home to her mother. Her mother scolds her for telling him everything, but she says that she could not live with him in a lie. When he shows up at her door on Sunday, and says that she owes him an answer, Nirmala thinks that he has read her letter and forgiven her, and she agrees happily to marry him. Bansi disguises himself as an astrologer and goes to Ashok's parents, hoping to trick them into agreeing to come for his wedding. The ruse fails, however, and Ashok's father refuses. Ashok and Nirmala get married and go to stay in a hotel on their wedding night.

As the newlyweds are about to go to bed, the hotel proprietor knocks on the door and hands Ashok a letter from Bansi. It is about their new house and Nirmala wants to read it; but it also contains her letter, which Bansi found under the carpet when he was packing up the camp. Nirmala is horrified, but gives the letter to Ashok. He reads it and walks away from her, stunned. When she follows him and pleads innocence, he agrees that she is innocent but that she is no longer the same Nirmala he worshipped and alienated his father for; he asks her why she did not leave the job as soon as she suspected Ranjit's intentions. She leaves and goes home to her mother, hoping that he will come and get her—but he does not. Back at Ashok's, Bansi confronts him. As weeks pass into months, Nirmala decides to leave her mother's since the neighbors are all gossiping about her prolonged stay. She goes to Nainital, where she gets a job as a governess to a man with seven children. She enjoys the children and her new employer is good to her, but she still longs for Ashok. Her new employer's brother-in-law and niece arrive for a visit, and Nirmala soon realizes that they are Ashok's father and sister. Ashok's sister Sudha befriends Nirmala, not knowing that she is her bhabhi. Then one day as Nirmala is out walking, she hears a holy man over the loudspeakers outside a mosque. His words move her, and she goes in to meet him and get his blessing. It is Ranjit! She flees, but he follows her home and tells her that he is reformed; that after his mother died (she understood very well what kind of man he was) he wandered the world for a bit, and found God, and repented for all his sins. Nirmala tells him bitterly that she does not believe him and tells him to leave. A few days later he shows up again. He has transformed himself again from a guru to Ranjit. He tells her that after seeing her, he could not get her out of his mind, and that she is right—his sins are too great for him to be a man of God. He wants to live with her and take care of her. She angrily rejects him, but he keeps visiting. Back at his home again, Ashok's father has become very ill, and calls for Ashok to come see him. At the house, Ashok sees a photograph of Nirmala, which his sister had brought with her from Nainital as a memento of their friendship. He tells her that Nirmala is his wife and explains why they are not together. His sister and father convince him to go get her and bring her home. He sets off for Nainital to find Nirmala. Sudha telegrams Nirmala about this, delightedly she awaits for him. But Ashok leaves without meeting Nirmala. Nirmala hears Ashok going and comes out of the house and finds Ranjit, who had whisked Ashok away by telling him a lie that Nirmala is now happily living with him as he obsessively loves her. Nirmala, when she is about to leave to stop Ashok, she is stopped by Ranjit, who says that she belongs to him forever, not Ashok, enraged Nirmala stabs Ranjit to death for ruining her life and separating her from Ashok. As she leaves to stop Ashok, her neighbour witnesses the murder. Nirmala stops Ashok and tells him the truth about Ranjit and confesses her crime. Ashok accepts Nirmala and realises his mistake for not trusting her. He then realises that the police are after Nirmala, and ensures her that he will take the blame on himself, but Nirmala refuses by saying that crime cannot go unpunished, and she will surrender to police in the morning and asks Ashok to spend one last night with her together before police separate them. Then Ashok and Nirmala spend their last night together and consummate their marriage. The film ends as dawn breaks.

== Cast ==
- Nutan as Nirmala
- Dharmendra as Ashok
- Rehman as Ranjit
- Leela Chitnis as Nirmala's mother
- Mumtaz Begum as Ranjit's mother
- Johnny Walker as Bansi
- Helen

== Soundtrack ==
The music was composed by Madan Mohan, with lyrics by Raja Mehdi Ali Khan.

1. "Kai Din Se Ji Hai Bekal" – Lata Mangeshkar
2. "Ek Haseen Sham Ko Dil Mera Kho Gaya" – Mohammed Rafi
3. "Hamaar Kahaa Maano Raaja" – Asha Bhosle, Usha Mangeshkar
4. "Kisi Ka Kuchh Kho Gaya Hai" – Mohammed Rafi
5. "Zindagi Dulhan Hai Ek Raat Ki" – Bhupinder Singh
6. "Ghayal Hirni Van Van Bhatke" – Bhupinder Singh
7. "Aapne Apna Banaaya Meharbaani Aapki" – Mahendra Kapoor, Lata Mangeshkar
8. "Kabhi Ai Haqiqat-E-Muntazar, Nazar Aa Libaas-E-Majaaz Men" – Lata Mangeshkar (written by Muhammad Iqbal)
9. "Maine Rang Lee Aaj Chunariya" – Lata Mangeshkar
10. "Sapnon Mein Agar Mere, Tum Aao To So Jau" – Lata Mangeshkar

The song "Maine Rang Lee Aaj Chunariya" is set in raga Pilu.
