= Dil Ne Phir Yaad Kiya =

Dil Ne Phir Yaad Kiya (lit. 'The Heart Remember's You Again') may refer to these Indian films:

- Dil Ne Phir Yaad Kiya (1966 film), a Hindi-language film
- Dil Ne Phir Yaad Kiya (2001 film), a Hindi-language film
