= Achyut Kanvinde =

Indian architect (1916–2002)

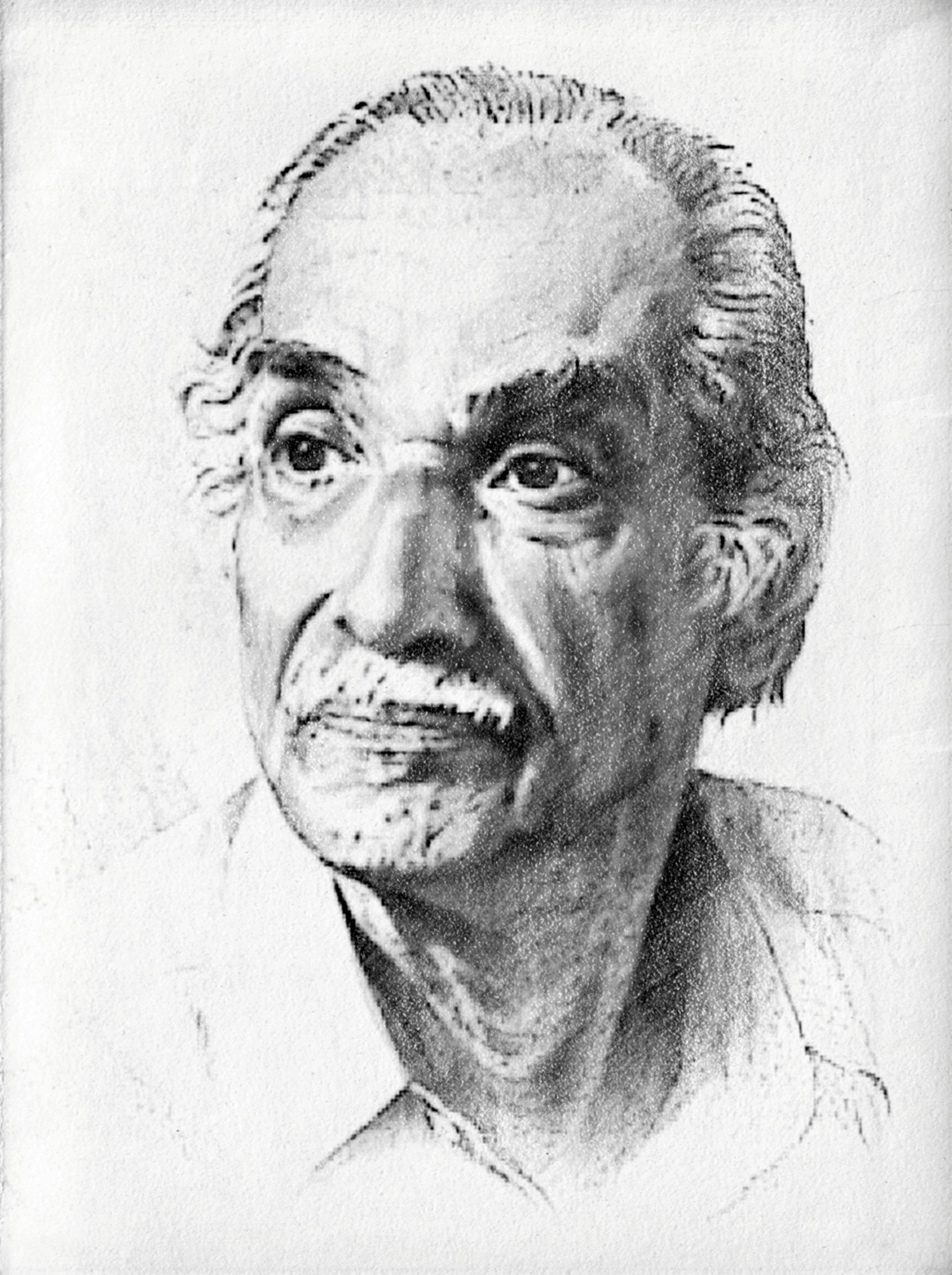
- Born: 9 February 1916; Achra, Bombay Presidency
- Died: 28 December 2002 (aged 86)
- Education: Sir J. J. College of Architecture
- Occupation: Architect
- Awards: Padma Shri (1974)
- Practice: Kanvinde, Rai and Chowdhury
- Buildings: Campus of Indian Institute of Technology Kanpur; Campus of Malaviya National Institute of Technology, Jaipur

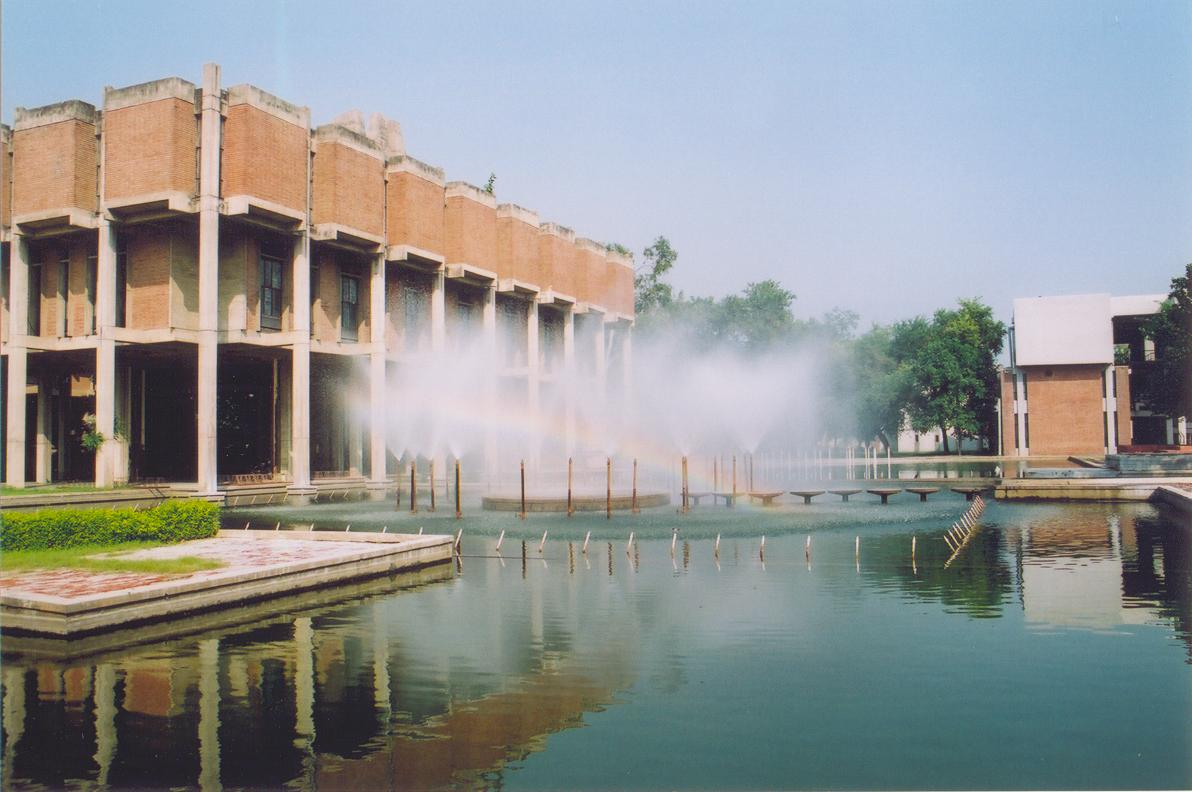
PK Kelkar Library, IIT Kanpur, designed by Achyut Kanvinde

Achyut Purushottam Kanvinde (9 February 1916 – 28 December 2002) was an Indian architect who worked in functionalist approaches with elements of Brutalist architecture. He received the Padma Shri in 1974.

== Early life and education ==
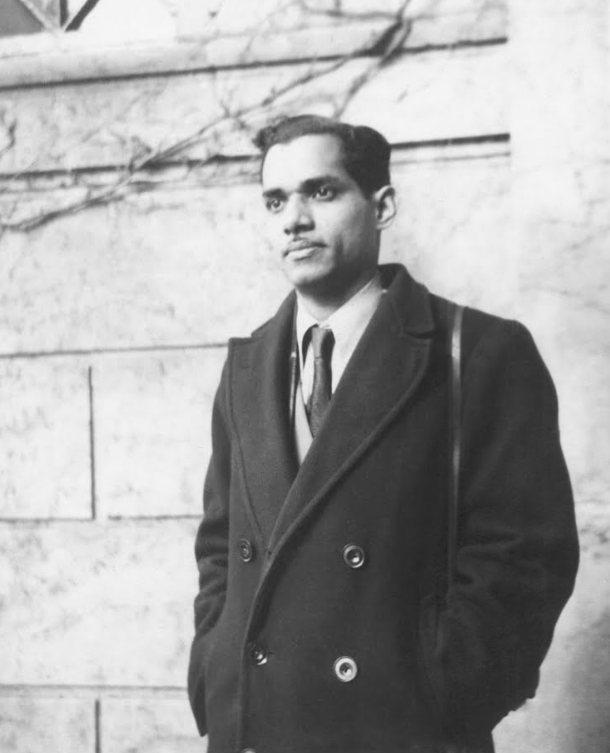
Achyut Kanvinde at CSIR

He was born on 9 February 1916 in Achra, in the Konkan region of Maharashtra, in a large family. His mother died when he was two and his father was an arts teacher in Mumbai. Kanvinde, influenced by his father, a portrait and landscape painter, took up art and graduated in architecture from Sir J.J. School of Arts, Mumbai in 1942. He was then sent by the Government of India to study at Harvard where he worked under Walter Gropius and was influenced by his thinking and teaching. The European masters of the Bauhaus – Albert Bayer, László Moholy-Nagy, Marcel Breuer, and the Swiss-American architectural historian Siegfried Giedion also had a great impact. Some of his famous batchmates were Paul Rudolph, I. M. Pei and John Perkins.

== Career ==
When he returned to India he joined the Council for Scientific and Industrial Research. In 1985, he was the winner of the IIA "Baburao Mhatre Gold Medal".

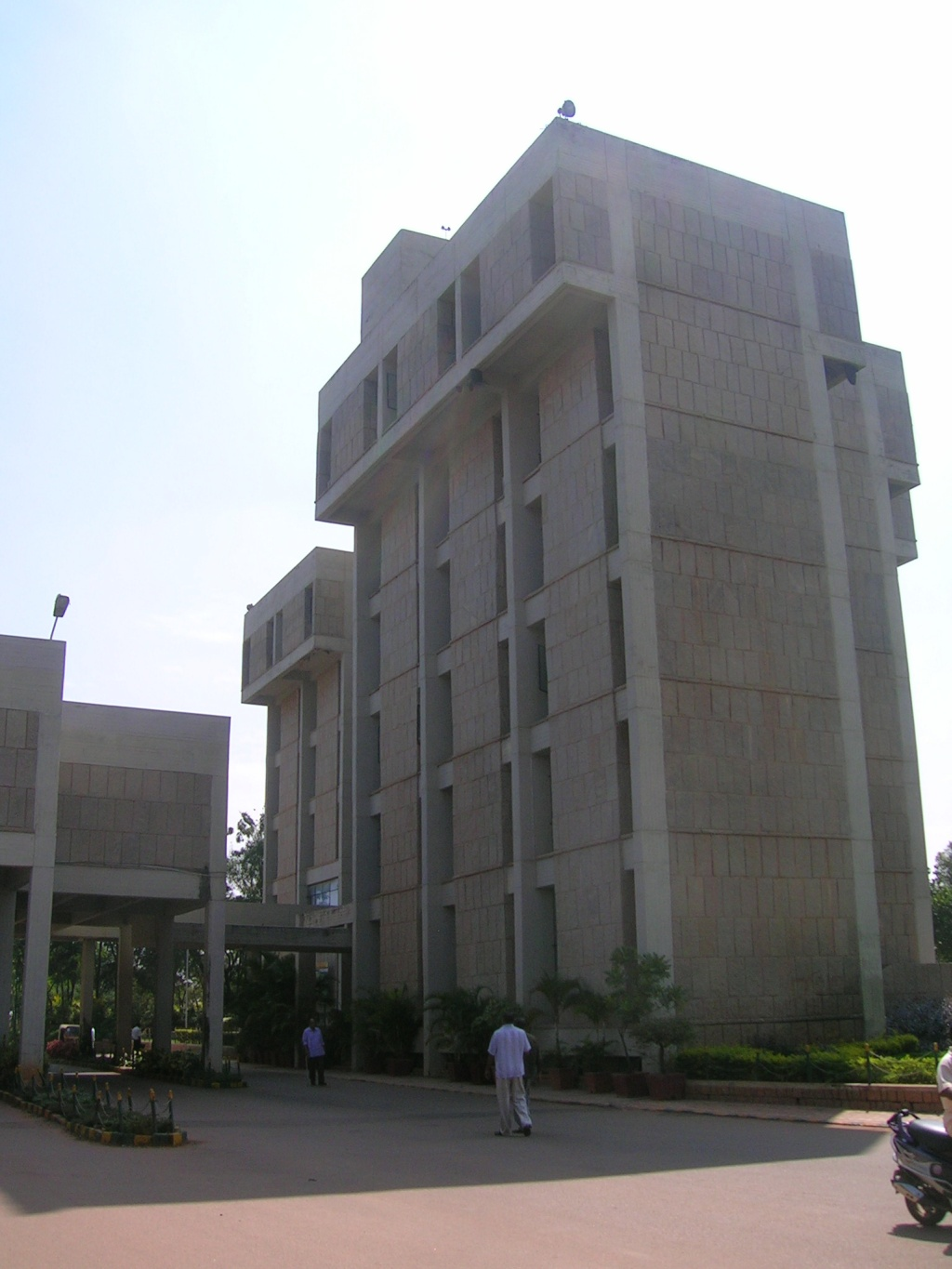
The University of Agricultural Sciences, Bangalore campus designed by Kanvinde and Rai

Along with his partner Shaukat Rai, he opened the firm Kanvinde, Rai and Chowdhury in New Delhi (which is currently run by Sanjay Kanvinde, B.K. Tanuja and Murad Chowdhury). The firm has been responsible for IIT Kanpur, National Science Centre, Delhi, The National Council of Applied Economic Research in New Delhi, NII Pune, numerous dairy buildings under NDDB (such as Dudhsagar Dairy plant in Mehsana) and many other buildings.

== Philosophy ==
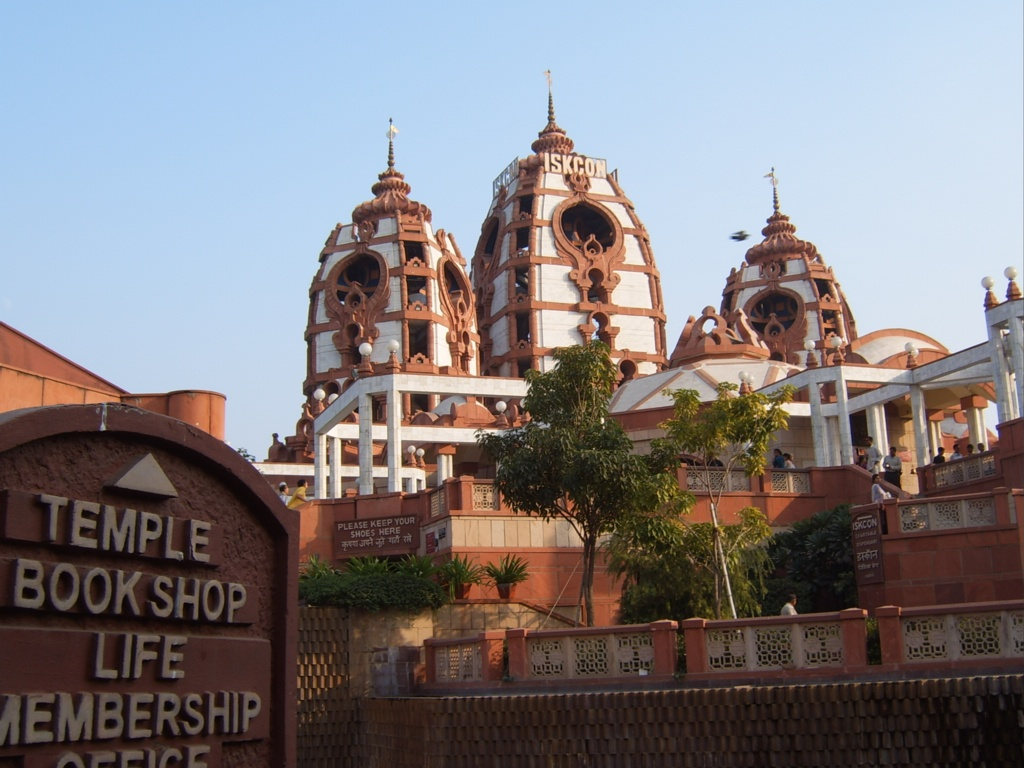
Iskcon Temple, Delhi

Kanvinde played with space and forms. A famous example is the ISKCON Temple at New Delhi. He gave great importance to natural light. The form of the building is such that the problem of ventilation as well as excessive heat is beautifully solved. He championed the cause of vernacular architecture. He believed that values and historical influences contributed towards good architecture. "Over the years I have come to believe it is imperative that an architect develop a sensitivity to human nature and a respect for human values. This, after all, is at the very core of his work. In India the search for a new architectural expression must continue – and this must go beyond the satisfaction of matter of fact functional needs. I think the designer's sensibility here must become aware of the accumulated wisdom of generations, but this should go together with the idea of progress reflected in the evolution of technology. In my own case, I must acknowledge my tremendous debt to Gropius – it was he who really exposed me to the power of technology on the one hand and the psychological dimensions of spatial organisation on the other. Actually my present concerns and realisations are all reflections of my earlier preoccupations: as a student at the J. J. School in Bombay my thesis was on "Architectural Composition and its Application to Indian Architecture."

== Design concepts ==
He believed that a grid of columns forming a matrix giving structural and spatial aspect would turn a design more sophisticated and faceted.

== Selected buildings ==
- ISKCON Temple, Delhi
- Malaviya National Institute of Technology, Jaipur
- Institute of Rural Management, Anand (IRMA)
- Dudhsagar Dairy plant in Mehsana
- Darpana Academy of Performing Arts (1962)
- Ahmedabad Textile Industry's Research Association (ATIRA) complex (1950–1954)
- Physical Research Laboratory (PRL) building (1952)
- University of Agricultural Sciences, Bangalore buildings
- Various Campus and Buildings under National Dairy Development Board (NDDB)
