= Abrar Alvi =

Indian director, writer & actor (1927 - 2009)

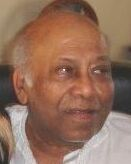
- Alvi in 2007
- Born: 1 July 1927
- Died: 18 November 2009 (aged 82); Mumbai, Maharashtra, India
- Occupations: Film screenwriter and director
- Years active: 1954 – 1995
- Notable work: Sahib Bibi Aur Ghulam (1962); Kaagaz Ke Phool (1959); Pyaasa (1957)

Abrar Alvi (1 July 1927 – 18 November 2009) was an Indian film writer, director and actor.

Most of his notable work was done in the 1950s and 1960s with Guru Dutt. He wrote some of the most respected works of Indian cinema, including Sahib Bibi Aur Ghulam (1962), Kaagaz Ke Phool (1959) and Pyaasa (1957), which have an avid following the world over. Pyaasa (1957 film) is included in the All-Time 100 Movies by Time magazine, as chosen by critics Richard Corliss and Richard Schickel.

== Early life and career ==
Abrar Alvi was born on 1 July 1927. During his college education in Nagpur, Maharashtra, he used to participate in college academic debates and was eventually writing and directing for theatre there. He also met a young Christian medical student from Lucknow at this college. Alvi wanted her to act in the college theatre with him but her father did not approve of this. Alvi would write her long, romantic letters which very much delighted the young student and it all resulted in a sweet college romance. Alvi, later in his life, realized that was his beginning of a writing career. This led to his entrance into the Bombay cinema and Alvi developing an ability to work with actors before their filmed scenes.

In a chance meeting with Guru Dutt on the sets of Baaz in 1953, Guru Dutt was having problems with a scene in the movie and Abrar suggested his opinion. Guru Dutt was so impressed that he invited Abrar to write Aar-Paar (1954), after which Abrar became an integral part of the Guru Dutt team. Many of the movies he worked on for Guru Dutt have since become classics, not only in India, but the world over. He also directed the box office hit Sahib Bibi Aur Ghulam (1962). He last appeared on a poignant three-part documentary on Guru Dutt, reminiscing on his work and days with the Guru Dutt team. The documentary was produced by Channel 4 and is included in the extra features section of Kaagaz Ke Phool and Chaudhvin ka Chand DVDs as well. After his association with Guru Dutt and due to controversy regarding who actually directed Sahib Bibi Aur Ghulam, he was unable to do any notable directorial work. Abrar, however, continued to pen screenplay and dialogue for several movies, some of these were hits, such as Professor, Prince, Suraj. He worked with Rajesh Khanna in two films - he was writer for Janta Hawaldar and wrote screenplay and dialogues for Begunaah. An integral part of the Guru Dutt team, he is noted for writing such films as Aar-Paar (1954), Sahib Bibi Aur Ghulam (1962), Kaagaz Ke Phool (1959), Pyaasa (1957) and Mr. & Mrs. '55. Alvi is most remembered and respected for transforming the practice of film dialogue writing in India where the film dialogue started to look close to the way the common man spoke.

== Sahib Bibi Aur Ghulam controversy ==
Sahib Bibi Aur Ghulam (1962) was important for Guru Dutt. Following the box-office disaster of Kaagaz Ke Phool, he lost almost 1.7 million on the movie. Guru Dutt needed a success to put him back on the map. The film went on to become a major box office success of the year. The film also won the president's silver medal and the 'Film of the Year' Award from the Bengal Film Journalist Association. The film was also screened at the Berlin Film Festival in June 1963 and was India's official entry to the Oscars that year.

The controversy about who actually directed Sahib Bibi Aur Ghulam has increased over the years. Since the film is characteristic of Guru Dutt's feel and style, it is difficult to think that he did not direct the film. However, Guru Dutt never denied Abrar Alvi's role in the film, nor did he make any counter-claims when Alvi won the Filmfare Award for Best Director for the film. Abrar Alvi has stated that Guru Dutt did direct the songs in the film, but not the film in its entirety. The editor of the film Y.G. Chawan says that for the film, it was Abrar who sat with him. To quote him: "Abrar worked so hard on that film but he never got any credit. People say it was produced by Guru Dutt so it had to be Guru Dutt's film."

== Awards ==
- Won – 10th National Film Awards (1962): President's silver medal for Best Feature Film in Hindi – Sahib Bibi Aur Ghulam
- Won – Filmfare Award for Best Director for: Sahib Bibi Aur Ghulam (1962).

== Death ==
Abrar Alvi died due to a stomach complication on Wednesday, 18 November 2009 in Mumbai. He was 82 years old.

== Select filmography ==
=== Writer ===
- Guddu (1995) (dialogue) (screenplay)
- Kasam Suhaag Ki (1989) (dialogue)
- Patthar Dil (1985) (dialogue) (screenplay)
- Khuda Kasam (1981) (dialogue) (screenplay)
- Biwi-O-Biwi: The Fun-Film (1981) (dialogue)
- Hamare Tumhare (1979) (dialogue) (screenplay)
- Sabse Bada Rupaiya (1976) (dialogues) (screenplay)
- Bairaag (1976) (dialogue)
- Laila Majnu (1976) (dialogue)
- Manoranjan (1974) (written by)
- Saathi (1968) (dialogue)
- Sunghursh (1968) (dialogue)
- Chhotisi Mulaqat (1967) (dialogue)
- Suraj (1966) (dialogue)
- Baharen Phir Bhi Aayengi (1966) (written by)
- Professor (1962) (dialogue) (screenplay)
- Sahib Bibi Aur Ghulam (1962) (dialogue and film director)
- Chaudhvin Ka Chand (1960)
- Kaagaz Ke Phool (1959) (dialogue) (screenplay)
- Pyaasa (1957) (dialogue)
- Mr. & Mrs. '55 (1955) (dialogue)
- Aar-Paar (1954) (dialogue) An integral part of the Guru Dutt team

=== Actor ===
- Laila Majnu (1976) – (Guest Appearance)
- 12 O'Clock (1958) – Police Inspector

=== Director ===
- Sahib Bibi Aur Ghulam (1962)
- Darar (Serial Screenplay)

== See also ==
- Category:Films with screenplays by Abrar Alvi
