= Roomal =

- Directed by: Ramchandra Thakur
- Produced by: Varuna Films
- Starring: Nargis; P. Jairaj; Rehman
- Music by: Hansraj Behl
- Release date: 1949
- Country: India
- Language: Hindi

Roomal is a 1949 Indian Hindi-language film directed by Ramchandra Thakur. The film stars Nargis, P. Jairaj, and Rehman. Its music was composed by Hansraj Behl.

== Plot ==
The film features a romantic plot between the characters of Nargis and Rehman. Jairaj plays Rehman's fiercely loyal elder brother, "who is willing to risk his reputation, nay, his very life, in order to save his brother".

== Cast ==
- Nargis
- P. Jairaj
- Rehman
- Jeevan
- Pratima Devi
- Badri Prasad
- Majnu

== Release and reception ==
Roomal was released on 30 December 1949 in Bombay.

In a review published on 14 January 1950, a critic for The Bombay Chronicle argued that Rehman's portrayal of a spoilt youth was his career's strongest till date, even though it was overshadowed by Jairaj's "exceptionally outstanding" performance.
