= Sathya Saran =

Indian journalist

Sathya Saran is an Indian journalist, editor, columnist and author. She formerly worked as the editor of Femina magazine, and has also authored biographies of personalities from Indian cinema, art and culture.

== Career ==
Saran has served as the editor of Femina, a women's magazine published by The Times Group. After her tenure with the magazine ended, she took up consulting editor roles with HarperCollins India and Penguin Random House India.

Besides this, she has also taught fashion journalism at the National Institute of Fashion Technology (NIFT).

== Writing ==
Saran has authored multiple nonfiction books, primarily biographies of figures from the Indian subcontinent.

== Biographies and non-fiction ==
- Ten Years with Guru Dutt: Abrar Alvi's Journey (Published by Penguin Random House)
- Sun Mere Bandhu Re: The Musical World of S.D. Burman (Published by HarperCollins)
- Baat Niklegi Toh Phir: The Life and Music of Jagjit Singh (Published by HarperCollins)
- Hariprasad Chaurasia: Breath of Gold (Published by Penguin Random House)
- Gulzar's Angoor: Insights into the Film (Published by HarperCollins)
- Being Ritu: The Unforgettable Story of Ritu Nanda (Published by HarperCollins)
- Ritu Nanda: Fir Bhi Rahenge Nishaniyan (Published by HarperCollins)
- Thread by Thread: The S.Kumar's Story (Published by Penguin Random House)

== Other works ==
- The Dark Side (Short Story Collection)
- Knot for Keeps: Writing the Modern Marriage (Essays and Stories)
- From Me to You (Essays and Stories)
- How to Look Like Miss India

Saran has also written columns and features that examine the lives of figures from the Indian culture.
