= Pyaasa =

1957 Indian film directed by Guru Dutt

- Theatrical release poster
- Directed by: Guru Dutt
- Written by: Abrar Alvi
- Screenplay by: Guru Dutt
- Story by: Guru Dutt
- Produced by: Guru Dutt
- Starring: Guru Dutt; Waheeda Rehman; Mala Sinha; Rehman; Johnny Walker
- Cinematography: V. K. Murthy
- Edited by: Y. G. Chawhan
- Music by: S. D. Burman
- Production company: Guru Dutt Films Pvt. Ltd.
- Distributed by: Guru Dutt Films Pvt. Ltd.
- Release date: 22 February 1957
- Running time: 153 minutes
- Country: India
- Languages: Hindi; Urdu
- Box office: ₹29 million

Pyaasa (Hindi pronunciation: [pjɑːsɑː]; transl. Thirsty) is a 1957 Indian Hindi drama film directed and produced by Guru Dutt, who also stars in the film alongside Waheeda Rehman, Mala Sinha, Rehman, and Johnny Walker. Set in Calcutta, the film tells the story of Vijay (played by Dutt), a disillusioned poet whose works are underestimated by publishers and criticized for focusing on social issues rather than romantic themes. The narrative follows Vijay's encounters with Gulabo (Waheeda Rehman), a kind-hearted prostitute, and Meena (Mala Sinha), his former girlfriend. Gulabo helps him get his poetry published, leading to the success of his works and the development of a romantic relationship between the two.

Pyaasa is regarded as a classic and is considered one of the greatest films in Indian cinema. It was remade into the Telugu film Mallepoovu in 1978.

== Plot ==
Full-length film

Vijay is an idealistic but unsuccessful Urdu poet in Calcutta whose works are dismissed by publishers. They criticize him for addressing social issues such as unemployment and poverty instead of writing about conventional romantic topics. His brothers also disapprove of his vocation and even attempt to sell his poems as waste paper. Unable to endure their mockery, Vijay leaves home and discovers that his brothers have sold his poems.

During this time, Vijay meets Gulabo, a prostitute who admires his poetry and falls in love with him. Meanwhile, Vijay's former girlfriend, Meena, has married a wealthy publisher named Ghosh for financial security. Ghosh hires Vijay as a servant to spy on him and Meena. Later, a beggar to whom Vijay had given his coat is mistakenly identified as Vijay after the beggar dies in a train accident. Believing Vijay to be dead, Gulabo approaches Ghosh and convinces him to publish Vijay's poems, selling her last possessions to ensure publication. Ghosh agrees, seeing an opportunity to profit from the posthumous success of the works. The poems become a massive success, but Vijay is actually alive, recovering in a hospital after the train incident. His partial amnesia is cured after he hears a nurse read his poems from a publication.

When Vijay returns, Ghosh and Shyam, Vijay's close friend, refuse to acknowledge him. Vijay is committed to a mental asylum after insisting that he is the real Vijay and being labeled as insane. His brothers are bribed by Ghosh to disown him, and a memorial service is held in honor of the anniversary of his purported death for the "deceased" poet. With the help of his friend the street masseur Abdul Sattar, Vijay escapes from the asylum and arrives at the memorial service, where he condemns the corrupt and materialistic world. Upon realizing that Vijay is alive, his friends and brothers side with a rival publisher for financial gain and declare him to be the real Vijay. At the ceremony, Vijay becomes disillusioned with the hypocrisy surrounding him and renounces his identity, declaring that he is not Vijay after having first tried to convince the crowd. He leaves with Gulabo to start a new life.

== Cast ==
- Guru Dutt as Vijay
- Waheeda Rehman as Gulabo – This was her first major leading role in Hindi cinema.
- Mala Sinha as Meena Sinha Ghosh
- Rehman as Mr. Ghosh
- Johnny Walker as Abdul Sattar
- Leela Mishra as Vijay's mother
- Kumkum as Juhi
- Moolchand as a restaurant owner
- Shyam Kapoor as Shyam
- Mehmood as Vijay's brother
- Tun Tun as Pushplata
- Moni Chatterjee as Chatterjee
- Tulsi Chakraborty

== Production ==
=== Development ===
Pyaasa was based on a story idea called Kashmakash, written by Guru Dutt sometime in 1947 or 1948, when he was 22. The film's theme and philosophy was inspired by his life experiences in the early struggles of his career. It is also surmised that the story is based on the life of the film's lyricist Sahir Ludhianvi, who had a failed affair with poet and writer Amrita Pritam.

Until production commenced in 1956, several changes were made to the original story with the assistance of Abrar Alvi, such as changing the protagonist originally being a painter. The film was originally titled Pyaas (thirst), but Dutt later changed it to Pyaasa to better describe the film. In the original ending, Guru Dutt wanted to show that Vijay being left all alone, but on the distributors' insistence this was changed. There was also a debate between writer Abrar Alvi and Dutt on the film's ending. Abrar wanted the protagonist to accept and compromise with the prevailing material social reality but Dutt insisted otherwise, wanting him to reunite with Gulabo.

Waheeda Rehman's character was inspired by a real life character. Abrar Alvi and his friends were visiting Bombay and decided to visit the red light area. Alvi began talking to a girl who called herself Gulabo. According to Alvi, "As I left, she thanked me in a broken voice, saying that it was the first time that she had been treated with respect, in a place where she heard only abuses. I used her exact words in the film.

=== Casting ===
Dutt wanted Dilip Kumar to play the lead role, which the 'tragedy king' declined, a major reason cited being the impact of doing intense films on Kumar's health. Reportedly, his doctors had advised him to take up lighter roles. Another possible reason that is cited is the alleged disagreement between him and Dutt over the film's distribution rights. Thus, Dutt himself played the role and movie went on to become one of the most commercially successful movies of the year.

The role of Shyam was originally to be played by Dutt's real life friend, Johnny Walker, but was then assigned to one of Dutt's assistant directors. Pyaasa was to be made with actresses Nargis Dutt and Madhubala in the roles Mala Sinha and Waheeda Rehman played, but the two actresses couldn't decide which role they wanted to play and Dutt eventually opted for the two, then new actresses, Mala and Waheeda.

=== Filming ===
Guru Dutt wanted to film red light area scenes on locations in Calcutta (now Kolkata), but the crew was attacked by a group of pimps. Dutt then recreated sets in Bombay on the basis of photos taken in Kolkata.

== Release and reception ==
After a slow opening, Pyaasa went on to be a major commercial success of the year. This gave Dutt the confidence to make a repeat on a grander scale. However that film, Kaagaz Ke Phool, went on to be a commercial disaster. The movie picked up a cult following the world over in the 1980s, long after Dutt had died.

== Soundtrack ==
The movie boasts one of the best performances of S.D. Burman, Sahir Ludhianvi, Geeta Dutt and Mohammed Rafi, to produce one of the most lyrical Hindi musicals. Sahir's work in the film's music was particularly praised; As stated in The Hindu, "While for Pyaasa, a film considered the brainchild of Guru Dutt, the soul behind the film was its lyricist Sahir Ludhianvi". Pyaasa marked the last collaboration of the long-lasting team of composer Burman and lyricist Ludhianvi.

The popular song "Hum Aapki Aankhon Mein" was added to the movie on behest of distributors to bring some relief in rather pessimistic film. It was never planned in the original cut. The song "Sar Jo Tera Chakraye", actually composed by R.D. Burman, S. D. Burman's son was originally inspired from a tune from the British film Harry Black, which was later released in India as Harry Black and The Tiger. He later recreated it so well that when the producer of Harry Black and the Tiger visited India, he heard the song and not only failed to recognise the tune, but applauded him on it.

In 2004, as part of Sight & Sound's feature "celebrating the relationship between cinema and music", Pyaasa was listed as one of The Best Music in Film and was named by Olivier Assayas as one of his favourites, who called its music as "possibly one of the most remarkable transpositions of poetry on screen."

No.	Title	Singer(s)	Length
1.	"Aaj Sajan Mohe Ang Lagalo"	Geeta Dutt	04:56
2.	"Ham Aapki Aankhon Me"	Geeta Dutt, Mohammed Rafi	05:42
3.	"Jaane Kya Tune Kahi, Jaane Kya Meine Suni (Raag Khamaj)"	Geeta Dutt	04:10
4.	"Jaane Woh Kaise Log Thay Jinn Kay Pyaar Ko Pyaar Mila"	Hemant Kumar	04:49
5.	"Sar Jo Tera Chakraye, Yaa Dil Dooba Jaaye"	Mohammed Rafi	04:33
6.	"Ye Duniya Agar Mil Bhi Jaye Tau Kya Hai (Raag Yaman Kalyan)"	Mohammed Rafi	05:08
7.	"Ye Hanste Huye Phool (Raag Chhayanat)"	Mohammed Rafi	07:50
8.	"Jinhen Naaz Hai Hind Par, Woh Kahan Hain"	[[Mohammed Rafi]]	06:06
9.	"Tang Aa Chuke Hain Kashm-e-Kashe Zindagi Se"	Mohammed Rafi	04:23
10.	"Ho lakh musibat raste mein"	Geeta Dutt, Mohammed Rafi	01:37

== Restoration ==
This film has been digitised and restored by Mumbai-based Ultra Media & Entertainment, thus becoming the first Indian film to be restored to its original. As per the report, the original camera negative had come to them from the archives completely melted, with parts damaged or lost. Their biggest challenge was the flickering. Every frame was at a different angle and there was no stability. After several clean-ups, they managed to retrieve the actual content from the original camera negative, but it lacked clarity and depth. 45 restoration experts worked for almost 4 months on over 2 lakh (200,000) frames. The original monaural soundtrack was remastered at 24-bit from the 35 mm optical soundtrack. The company sent it to the 72nd Venice International Film Festival held in 2015, where it competed with 20 other restored classics and was selected to be screened as part of the Venice Classics section along with 11 other films from all over the world.

== Reception & Legacy ==
On the review aggregator site Rotten Tomatoes, the film has a score of 100% based on 8 reviews, with an average rating of 9.00/10.

Pyaasa is regarded as one of the greatest films ever made and features on world cinema's greatest films lists. It was one of the earliest films to have achieved a blend of artistic as well as commercial mainstream traits. Filmmakers in India, cite Pyaasa as their inspiration. It is one of the most revered and respected films in India and remains a popular favourite among cinephiles and filmmakers of Hindi Cinema.

It is, in particular, praised for its technical bravura, storytelling, theme and romantic idealism. Its soundtrack was the first major of its type in carrying the narrative forward– utilising songs which are a major part of Hindi Cinema's mainstream films and transposing poetry on screen. In 2004, its soundtrack was listed by Sight and Sound magazine as one of The Best Music in Film.

The film received international acclaim in the 1980s when it was first released in Europe, subsequently becoming a big commercial success there. Pyaasa is now considered a "seminal landmark" in the history of Indian cinema. Guru Dutt and his later movies, including Pyaasa, have a large cult following, particularly in France, Germany, South Asia and parts of East Asia (Japan, Singapore, etc). It was a huge commercial success during its 1984 French Premiere, something Guru Dutt never witnessed during his lifetime. Since then, the movie has been screened to acclaim the world over, like the recent screening at 72nd Venice International Film Festival held in Italy, in September 2015.

Pyaasa is often listed among greatest films ever made. In 2002, Pyaasa received 4 votes, placing it at around 160th place in the Sight & Sound critics' and directors' poll of the greatest films of all time. In 2005, Pyaasa was the only Hindi film to make it to the "100 Greatest Films of All Time" list by Time magazine, which called it "the soulfully romantic of the lot." On the occasion of Valentine's Day 2011, Time declared it as one of the "Top 10 Romantic Movies". It is frequently voted in Time Reader's Choice Top 10 movies.

Indiatimes ranks it among "25 Must See Bollywood Movies". On the centenary of Indian cinema in 2013, CNN- IBN listed it among "100 Greatest Indian films of all time", calling it "The most soulful romantic Hindi film ever made". It was also included among NDTV's "20 Greatest Indian Films" citing, "the cinematic mastery on display in Pyaasa has rarely been replicated in mainstream Indian cinema"; British Film Institute's "Top 5 of India's Greatest Films" poll in 2002; Time's "Top 3 of Bollywood's Best Classics"; Esquire's '10 Best Bollywood Movies' calling it, "the ultimate posthumous dream"; Outlook's 'Top 5 of Hindi Cinema's Greatest Films' poll of 25 leading Indian Directors in 2003; Time-Out's 'Top 5 of Bollywood's Best Movies' poll in 2015.

In 2013, to celebrate the centenary year of Indian cinema by selecting one essential Indian film from each decade, The Guardian named Pyaasa as the 'Quintessential Indian Classic of 1950s' decade citing, "The 1950s is the hardest decade from which to pick a film. Guru Dutt's melodramatic Pyaasa or 'The desirous one' is 'extraordinary', a film that draws on all the features of a mainstream movie to achieve a high aesthetic, from the beautiful photography of the Christ-like tormented poet, the beauty of the streetgirl (Waheeda Rehman) and the wonderful music with some of the great Sahir Ludhianvi's best lyrics." In 2019, the British Film Institute named it the 'Greatest Musical of 1957', stating, "Until his tragic overdose in 1964, its director-producer-star Guru Dutt was one of Indian cinema's boldest talents and Pyaasa is his masterpiece."

On the website They Shoot Pictures, Don't They, which aggregates film polls to determine the most acclaimed movies of all time, Pyaasa is ranked in 330th place.

In 2011, the British author Nasreen Munni Kabir published The Dialogue of Pyaasa, which contains original dialogue for the film in Hindi and Urdu as well as its translation into English.

== Bibliography ==
- Rajadhyaksha, Ashish; Willemen, Paul (1998) [1994]. Encyclopaedia of Indian Cinema (PDF). Oxford University Press. ISBN 0-19-563579-5.
- Kabir, Nasreen Munni (2011). The Dialogue of Pyaasa. Om Books International. ISBN 978-93-80070-53-7.
