= M. R. Acharekar =

Indian artist, director

- Born: Murlidhar Ramchandra Acharekar; 1907; Achra, Maharashtra
- Died: 1979 (aged 71–72); Delhi, India
- Occupations: Artist, art director, author
- Awards: Padma Shri

Murlidhar Ramachandra Acharekar (1907–1979) was an Indian artist and film art director in Hindi cinema who won the Filmfare Best Art Direction Award three times: for Pardesi (1958), for Kaagaz Ke Phool (1960), and for Jis Desh Men Ganga Behti Hai (1962).

== Early life ==
M.R. Acharekar was born in Hadi Village, near Achra in Sindhudurg District, Maharashtra.

== Career ==
1923–28 M.R Acharekar explored new areas of expression like photography and lithography, and also started a lithopress in Bombay. He became noted for his early success at various exhibitions at home and abroad, and would eventually execute important commissions, painting such historical events as the inauguration of the Round Table Conference by King George V in 1932 and the Silver Jubilee Celebrations of King George V in 1935 in London. He was sent to the latter with special credentials by the then-Viceroy of India, Lord Willingdon.

Acharekar Continued to draw portraits of dignitaries and eminent men and women in India for over forty years. His book, Rupadarsini, An Indian Approach to Human Form addressed the controversial issue of figure drawing.

== Career highlights ==
- 1947 President, Art Society of India, Bombay.
- 1952 He travelled to the United States, as a member of the Indian Film Delegation, at the invitation of Motion Picture Association of America and State Dept, USA.
- 1954 Published Sky Scrapers and Flying Gandharvas.
- 1956 The Apostle of Peace, pencil sketches of Jawaharlal Nehru was published.He worked with Raj Kapoor and Guru Dutt as Art Director.
- 1960 Member, Selection and Judging Committee, National Exhibition, Lalit Kala Akademi, New Delhi.
- 1968 President, Cine Art Directors Association of India, Bombay.
- 1972–73 President, Bombay Art Society, Bombay.
- 1973 He was commissioned by the Selection Committee, National Art Gallery, Delhi.

== Education ==
- 1917–23 Studied at Ketkar Institute of Art, Bombay.
- 1928 Diploma in Painting, Govt. of Maharashtra, Bombay.
- 1932–34 Studied at Royal College of Art, London.

== Exhibitions ==
- 1932, Exhibited painting titled Round Table Conference, Imperial Institute, London.
- 1937 Solo exhb. Inaugurated by Maharaja of Mandi, New Delhi.
- 1954, 56, 58, 79 Solo exhibitions., Bombay.
- 1973, exhibitions of 51 Paintings depicting the first hundred years of the freedom movement (1757–1856), inaugurated by Indira Gandhi, Birla Bhavan, New Delhi.
- 2004, Manifestations II, organised by Delhi Art Gallery, Jehangir Art Gallery, Mumbai and Delhi Art Gallery, New Delhi.

== Awards ==
- 1929- Painting Name- CONCENTRATION- Prize- Maharaja of Bhavnagar's Prize.
- 1929- Same Painting wins Gold Medal in Bangalore & Nagpur.
- 1930- Painting Name- PRAYER- Prize-Silver Medal, Bombay Art Society, Mumbai.
- 1931- Painting Name- RIPOSE- Prize-Gold Medal, Bombay Art Society, Mumbai.
- 1955 Awarded Tamra Patra, Govt. of India.
- 1957, 59, 61 Filmfare Award, for Art Direction, Mumbai.
- 1957 Awarded Film Journalists Association Trophy, Mumbai.
- 1968 Awarded Padmashri, Govt of India.

== Teaching experience ==
- 1923 Appointed as Junior Teacher, Ketkar Institute of Art, Bombay.
- 1937–39 Deputy Director, Sir J. J. School of Art, Bombay.
- 1948–56 Principal, Academy of Art, Bombay.

== Art Direction/Production Design ==
- Satyam Shivam Sundaram: Love Sublime (1978) [Production Designer]
- Mera Naam Joker (1970) [Art Director]
- Bombai Raat Ke Bahon Mein (1968) [Art Director] [Set Decorator]
- Sapnon Ka Saudagar (1968) [Set Designer] (as M.R. Acharekar)
- Suraj (1966) [Art Director]
- Amrapali (1966) [Art Director]
- Rajkumar (1964) [Art Director]
- Sangam (1964/I) [Production Designer]
- Dil Hi To Hai (1963) [Art Director]
- Jis Desh Men Ganga Behti Hai (1960) [Art Director] [Production Controller]
- Anari (1959) [Art Director]
- Kaagaz Ke Phool (1959) [Art Director]
- Ab Dilli Dur Nahin (1957) [Art Director] [Production Controller]
- Pardesi (1957) [Art Director]
- Jagte Raho (1956) [Art Director] (as M.R. Acharekar) [Production Controller] (as M.R. Acharekar)
- Shree 420 (1955) [Art Director] (as M.R. Acharekar) [Production Controller] (as M.R. Acharekar)
- Boot Polish (1954) [Art Director]
- Aan (1952) [Art Director] (as M.R. Acharekar)
- Ashiana (1952) [Art Director]
- Bewafa (1952) [Art Director]
- Awaara (1951) [Art Director]
- Naujawan (1951) [Art Director]
- Shahjahan (1946) [Production Designer]
