= The Hundred Luminaries of Hindi Cinema =

1996 book by Dinesh Raheja and Jitendra Kothari

- Author: Dinesh Raheja; Jitendra Kothari
- Language: English
- Subject: Personalities of Hindi cinema
- Genre: Film history
- Publisher: India Book House
- Publication date: 1996
- Publication place: India
- Media type: Print
- Pages: 143
- ISBN: 978-8175080072

The Hundred Luminaries of Hindi Cinema is a 1996 film history book by Indian film journalists Dinesh Raheja and Jitendra Kothari, published by India Book House. The book presents biographical profiles of 100 significant personalities associated with Hindi cinema, including actors, filmmakers, music directors, playback singers, and writers. In the foreword, Amitabh Bachchan likens it to a "time capsule" intended to preserve Hindi cinema for posterity.

Film scholar Piyush Roy identifies the book as a representative early work of Indian cinema writing that preceded more academically oriented studies. The book was launched during the 1996 week of centenary celebrations of Hindi cinema and received contemporary reviews in publications including India Today, The Hindu, Hindustan Times, Frontline, and Indian Review of Books.

== Background and development ==
According to author Dinesh Raheja, the book originated from an eponymous 1996 cover story in Movie magazine, written by him and deputy editor Jitendra Kothari. After reading the cover story, India Book House publisher Padmini Mirchandani commissioned the pair to expand it into a full-length book.

== Content ==
Film scholar Piyush Roy identifies The Hundred Luminaries of Hindi Cinema as one of the representative early works of Indian cinema writing, placing it alongside filmographies and encyclopaedic compilations produced before the emergence of more academically oriented studies.

The book presents biographical profiles of 100 significant figures in the history of Hindi cinema, covering actors, filmmakers, music directors, playback singers, and writers. The authors stated that they deliberately limited the selection to 100 figures, resulting in the omission of personalities such as Rakhee, Asha Parekh, and O. P. Nayyar.

Actor Amitabh Bachchan wrote the foreword, while Rekha contributed a short note for the final page.

== Design ==
Raheja stated that he, Kothari and Mirchandani intentionally avoided featuring film personalities on the book cover, instead opting for a minimalist typographic design with white lettering on a black background and the word "Hundred" embossed in gold, believing that a collage of stars would diminish the prominence of the featured personalities.

== Release ==
The book was released by India Book House Publishers in Bombay in 1996. Scholar Tejaswini Ganti notes that the book's release function, held during the week of Hindi cinema's centenary celebrations, drew attendance from several prominent members of the Hindi film industry, including Dimple Kapadia, Ramesh Sippy, Nadira, Shashi Kapoor, Anupam Kher, and Manoj Kumar.

== Critical reception ==
Amit Agarwal of India Today stated that the book successfully fulfilled its aim of providing "a minimal perspective" on the careers and lives of Hindi cinema's enduring personalities. Agarwal praised the authors' insider knowledge, their inclusion of lesser-known anecdotes, their balanced treatment of both the successes and setbacks of film personalities, and the book's design and photographs. He criticized the writing style as clichéd, though concluded that the presentation largely compensated for this weakness.

A reviewer for The Hindu accepted the book's stated focus on Hindi cinema but questioned some of the editorial choices, particularly the omission of figures such as Master Nissar and Majrooh Sultanpuri from the selection of 100 luminaries. The book was also reviewed by Bhawana Somaaya in Hindustan Times, V. Abdulla in Frontline, and M. U. Jayadeva in Indian Review of Books.
