= Guddu (film) =

1995 Indian film by Prem Lalwani

- Poster
- Directed by: Prem Lalwani
- Written by: Abrar Alvi
- Produced by: Prem Lalwani; Vivek Lalwani
- Starring: Shah Rukh Khan; Manisha Koirala; Deepti Naval; Mukesh Khanna
- Cinematography: V. Durga Prasad
- Edited by: Mohan Kaul
- Music by: Naushad
- Release date: 11 August 1995
- Running time: 153 minutes
- Country: India
- Language: Hindi
- Budget: ₹2 crore
- Box office: ₹4.48 crore

Guddu is a 1995 Indian Hindi-language romantic drama film written by Abrar Alvi and directed by Prem Lalwani (in his directorial debut). The film stars Shah Rukh Khan, Manisha Koirala, Deepti Naval, Mukesh Khanna and Mehmood.

== Plot ==
Guddu is the son of rich, successful advocate Vikram and his wife, Kavita. While Kavita is a devout and a religious Hindu, Vikram is an atheist. Guddu and Salina Gupta are in love. One day while driving, they have an accident and Salina loses her sight. Guddu blames himself and so do Salina's guardians. Guddu is asked to keep away from Salina. Salina knows that the accident was not Guddu's fault, but would not like to meet Guddu and be a burden on him. Guddu overhears a conversation between their family doctor and his father and he learns that he has a brain tumor and has only a few more months to live. He wants to donate his eyes to the hospital so Salina can benefit from them, but his father will not even consider this. The situation worsens when Guddu decides to go to court to assert his right to donate his eyes, his father ends in the hospital and so does Guddu. Kavita couldn't bear the trauma of her husband's illness and her son's disease, thus she decides to devote herself to god for five days without drinking a sip of water. Her prayers are answered and her husband's life is saved and her son's operation is successful. She dies at the feet of God while praying and her eyes are donated to Salina. Salina and Guddu marry and are blessed with twins and they live happily ever after.

== Cast ==
- Shahrukh Khan as Guddu Bahadur
- Manisha Koirala as Salina Gupta
- Mukesh Khanna as Vikram Bahadur
- Deepti Naval as Kavita Bahadur
- Ashok Saraf as Baliya
- Vijayendra Ghatge as Rehman
- Aarti Nagpal as Sonia
- Navin Nischol as Dr. Gupta
- Maya Alagh as Mrs. Gupta
- Vikas Anand as Dr. Bhatia
- Shashi Kiran as Fazal
- Sudhir Dalvi as Judge
- Mehmood as Qawwali Singer Mahesh
- Saeed Jaffrey as Qawwali Singer Yashpal

== Production ==
Shah Rukh Khan was paid ₹30 lakh to act in this film.

== Music ==
Guddu

Soundtrack album by Naushad
- Released: 1995
- Genre: Feature film soundtrack

Naushad chronology
Aawaz De Kahan Hai (1990)	Guddu (1995)	Taj Mahal: An Eternal Love Story (2005)

The soundtrack for the movie was composed by Naushad, with lyrics by Majrooh Sultanpuri. The soundtrack consists of 7 songs, featuring vocals by Lata Mangeshkar, Sadhana Sargam, Kumar Sanu, Devki Pandit, Mohammed Aziz, Majid Shola and Suresh Wadkar.

1. "Hum Dono Panchhi" - Kumar Sanu, Devki Pandit
2. "Daddy Se Poochh Lena" - Kumar Sanu, Devki Pandit
3. "Dil Hai Pyare" - Kumar Sanu, Sadhana Sargam
4. "Gulashan-Gulashan Kali-Kali" - Suresh Wadkar, Devki Pandit
5. "Mere To Radheshyam" - Lata Mangeshkar
6. "Pyar Mera Zindagi" - Kumar Sanu, Devki Pandit
7. "Dil Kahe Har Dum" - Suresh Wadkar, Mohammed Aziz, Majid Shola
