= Rehman (actor) =

Indian actor (1921-1984)

- Born: Syed Rehman Khan; 23 June 1921; Lahore, British India (present-day Lahore, Pakistan)
- Died: 5 November 1984 (aged 63); Bombay, India (present-day Mumbai, India)
- Other name: Said Rehman Khan
- Occupation: Actor
- Years active: 1946 – 1982
- Known for: Sahib Bibi Aur Ghulam; Chaudhvin Ka Chand; Pyaasa
- Relatives: Faisal Rehman (nephew); Fasih Ur Rehman (nephew)

Syed Rehman Khan (23 June 1921 – 5 November 1984) was an Indian actor whose career spanned from the late 1940s through to the late 1970s. He was an integral part of the Guru Dutt team, and most known for his roles in films such as Pyar Ki Jeet (1948), Badi Behen (1949), Pardes (1950), Pyaasa (1957), Choti Behen (1959), Chaudhvin Ka Chand (1960), Sahib Bibi Aur Ghulam (1962), Dil Ne Phir Yaad Kiya (1966) and Waqt (1965).

In 2022, he was placed in Outlook India's "75 Best Bollywood Actors" list.

== Early life and education ==
Syed Rehman Khan was an actor in Hindi and Indian films. He was born on 23 June 1921 in Lahore, Punjab Province, British India (now in Punjab, Pakistan) into the royal Mohammadzai clan of the Barakzai tribe of the Durrani confederacy of Pashtuns. His Afghan ancestors moved to Punjab, India from Kabul, Afghanistan in 1905 during the British Raj. His family claims ancestry from king Amanullah Khan of Paghman and from founder of the Durrani Empire and the modern state of Afghanistan, Ahmad Shah Abdali of Herat.

He graduated from Robertson College Jabalpur, staying in BeoharNiwas Palace. Among his nephews are prominent Pakistani film and TV actor Faisal Rehman and Fasih Ur Rehman, Indian classical dancer, and sons of his younger brother Massud-ur-Rehman, the famous cinematographer in Pakistan.

== Film career ==
After college (1942), he joined the Royal Indian Air Force and trained at Poona as a pilot. The Air Force didn't appeal to him and soon left for a career in films at Bombay. He is best known for his suave sophisticated roles, which suited his personality. His movie career started with a job as third assistant director to Vishram Bedekar at the studios in Pune. Vishram needed an Afghan who could tie a Pashtun turban on one of his characters. Rehman could do that, being a Pashtun, and that brought him to the screen for some lead roles. One of his major hits as hero was Pyar Ki Jeet with Suraiya, and the song-"Ek Dil Ke Tukade Hazar Hue, Koi Yahan Gira, Koi Wahan Gira" was a major hit. Badi Behen was another big hit with Suraiya. He was also interested in marrying Suraiya, along with many other suitors, though she was adamant in wanting to marry Dev Anand. He also worked with Madhubala in Paras (1949) and Pardes (1950); both the films were critical and commercial successes.

Initially he played lead roles, but as time passed, he accepted supporting roles and made his mark in some hit films like Pyaasa, Chaudhvin Ka Chand and Sahib Bibi Aur Ghulam (in which he played a debauched zamindar, Chhote Sarkar), and Waqt which were some of his memorable roles, the first three with Guru Dutt, famous actor, producer, director. Rehman also did key roles in Baharon Ki Manzil, Gomti Ke Kinare, Dushman and Holi Aayi Re.

Rehman received four Filmfare nominations as Best Supporting Actor for Phir Subah Hogi (1958), Chaudhvin Ka Chand (1960), Sahib Bibi Aur Ghulam (1962) and Dil Ne Phir Yaad Kiya (1966) but did not end up winning any of them.

== Death ==
In 1977, he suffered three heart attacks due to excessive alcohol consumption. He was also a chain smoker and he was diagnosed with throat cancer. A man whose majestic voice was his signature, lost his voice and he was unable to speak during his last days in his life. Rehman died in 1984.

== Selected filmography ==
Year	Film	Role	Notes
1946	Hum Ek Hain	Yousuf	Debut film
1946	Nargis		
1947	Intezar Ke Baad		
1947	Tohfa		
1948	Pyar Ki Jeet		
1948	Veena		
1949	Bari Behen	Shyam	
1949	Paras	Kumar	
1949	Roomal		
1949	Roop Lekha		
1950	Badi Bahen		
1950	Pardes	Rajan	
1950	Pyar Ki Manzil		
1950	Raj Rani		
1950	Shaan		
1950	Shadi Ki Raat		
1951	Ek Nazar	Raj (Rajju)	
1952	Ajeeb Larki		
1953	Gauhar	Manohar	
1954	Pyaase Nain		
1957	Miss Bombay		
1957	Perveen		
1957	Pyaasa	Ghosh	
1957	Ustad		
1958	12 O'Clock		
1958	Phir Subah Hogi	Rehman	
1958	Trolley Driver		
1959	Aangan		
1959	Chhoti Bahen	Shekhar	
1959	Pehli Raat		
1960	Chaudhvin Ka Chand	Nawab Pyare Miyan	
1960	Chhalia	Kewal	
1960	Ghunghat	Manohar	
1961	Batwara	Pran	
1961	Dharmputra	Javed	
1962	Sahib Bibi Aur Ghulam	Chhote Babu	
1963	Taj Mahal	Noor-ud-din Jahangir	
1963	Yeh Rastey Hain Pyar Ke	Ashok Shrivastav	
1964	Ganga Ki Lahren	Dr. Balraj	
1964	Gazal	Akhtar Nawab	
1964	Kaise Kahoon	Dr. Shailesh	
1964	Shehnai	Amarjeet	Guest Appearance
1965	Janwar	Mahendra Shrivastav	
1965	Waqt	Chinoy	
1966	Baharen Phir Bhi Aayengi	Vikram Verma's elder brother	
1966	Chhota Bhai	Dewan	
1966	Daadi Maa	Dr. Bharati	
1966	Dil Diya Dard Liya	Satish	
1966	Dil Ne Phir Yaad Liya	Amjad	
1966	Do Dilon Ki Dastan		
1966	Sagaai	Dr. Tandon	
1966	Sunehre Kadam	Shekhar	
1967	Dulhan Ek Raat Ki	Ranjeet	
1967	Mera Munna	Anand	
1967	Noor Jehan	Jalaluddin Mohammed Akbar	
1967	Palki	Nawab	
1968	Aabroo	Chandra Shekhar Verma	
1968	Abhilasha	Ranjeet Singh	
1968	Baharon Ki Manzil	Subodh Roy	
1968	Humsaya	Pratap Singh	
1968	Juari	Chaari	
1968	Mere Hamdam Mere Dost	Ajeet Narang	
1968	Payal Ki Jhankar	Diwan	
1968	Shikar	Sharma	
1969	Intaqam	Sohan Lal	
1970	Darpan	Dr. Jayadev Dutt	
1970	Devi	Dr. Shekhar's elder brother	
1970	Maa Aur Mamta	Father Henry	
1970	Holi Ayee Re	Gopal Singh	
1970	Mastana	Dhanraj	
1970	Umang		
1971	Chingari		
1971	Ek Thi Reeta		
1971	Ganga Tera Pani Amrit	Devkinandan	
1972	Dushman	Judge	
1972	Gomti Ke Kinare	Gopal Das	
1972	Jai Jwala alias Puja Aur Payal		
1972	Rut Rangeeli Aayi		
1973	Anhonee	Inspector General	
1973	Heera Panna	Raja Sahib	
1973	Insaan Aur Insaan		
1973	Kashmakash	Rana Chaudhary	
1973	Naina	Bansi Lal Verma	
1974	Aap Ki Kasam	Sunita's father	
1974	Aarop		
1974	Asliyat		
1974	Azad Mohabbat		
1974	Dost	Kaajal Gupta's father	
1974	Majboor	Surendra Sinha	
1974	Nirmaan	Shyam Lal	
1974	Prem Shastra	Rajan Arora	
1975	Aandhi	K. Bose	
1977	Aashiq Hoon Baharon Ka	Chandidas Rai	
1977	Amaanat	Amar	
1977	Chacha Bhatija	Ranveer Singh Teja	
1979	Salaam Memsaab	Mehra	
1980	Ramu Toh Diwana Hai		
1980	Sanjh Ki Bela		
1980	Zalim		
1981	Ahista Ahista	Dr. Siddiqui	
1981	Dhanwan	Shyam Seth	Guest Appearance
1982	Rajput	Pratap Singh	
1982	Vakil Babu	Khan	
1982	Dil...Akhir Dil Hai	Arvind Desai	Final film & role
2013	Love In Bombay	Preeti Mehra's father	Posthumous release; Made in 1971 but completed in 2013.
