= Achra, India =

Village in Maharashtra

Achra
- Village
- Location in Maharashtra, India Achra (India)
- Coordinates: 16°13′0″N 73°28′0″E
- Country: India
- State: Maharashtra
- District: Sindhudurg

Languages
  - Official: Marathi
- Time zone: UTC+5:30 (IST)
- Telephone code: 02365
- Vehicle registration: MH-07
- Nearest city: Malvan, Kankavli

Achra is a coastal village in the Sindhudurg district, Maharashtra, India.

== Demography ==
Achra is part of Malvan taluka.

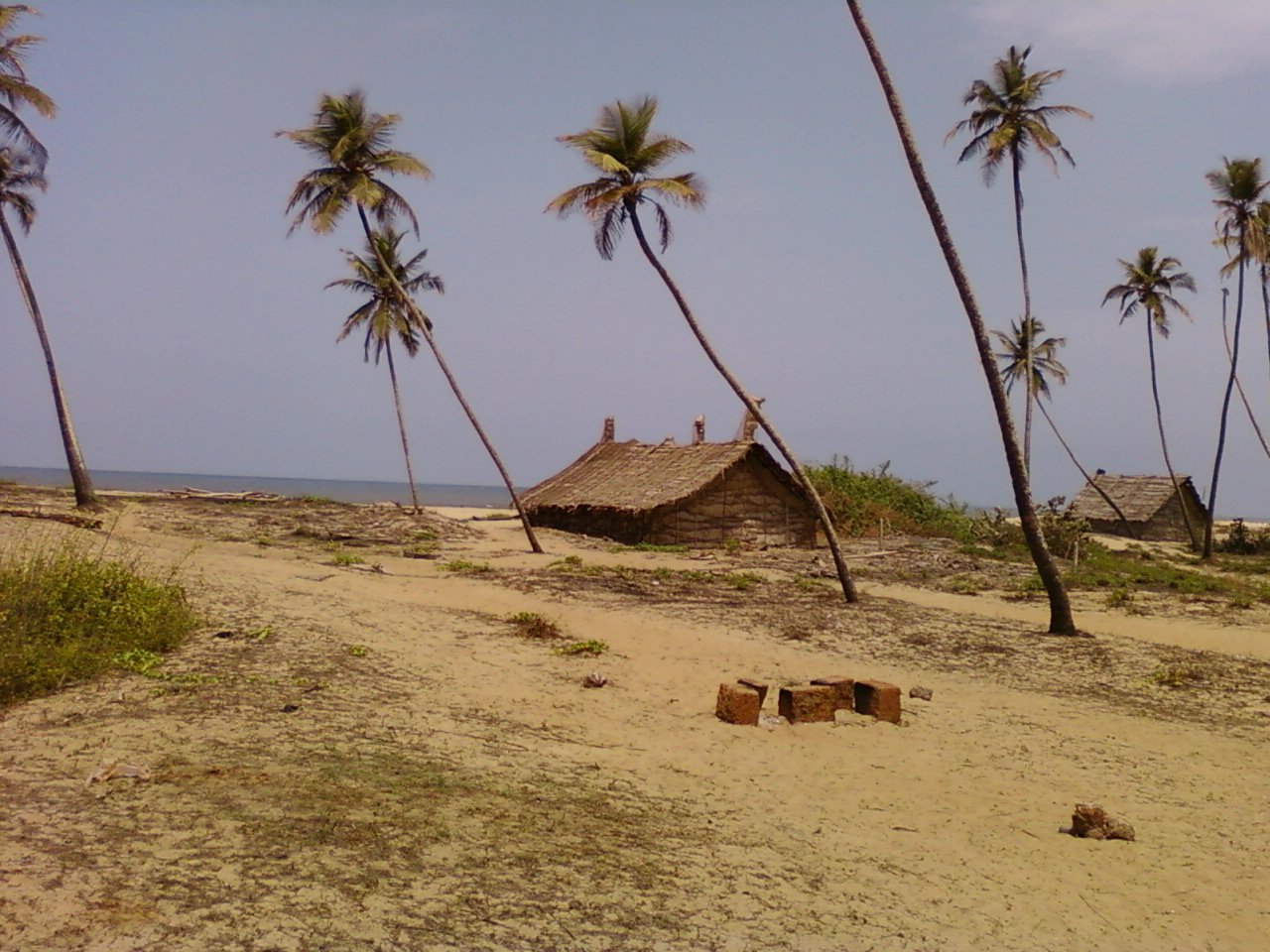
Pirawadi beach at Achra

== Attractions ==
Achra Village is known for Shri Rameshwar Temple which is one of the oldest Shiv temple in Maharashtra. Also, Achra has beautiful Achra Bandar beach. The beach in Pirawadi is a virgin beach. Zamdul is an island.

== Notable people ==
- Padmashri M.R. Acharekar, an artist and film director.
- Achyut Kanvinde Padmashri (1974) winner architect.
