= Chaudhvin Ka Chand =

1960 film

- Theatrical poster
- Directed by: M. Sadiq
- Written by: Saghir Usmani
- Screenplay by: Saghir Usmani
- Produced by: Guru Dutt
- Starring: Guru Dutt; Waheeda Rehman; Rehman; Johnny Walker
- Cinematography: Nariman Irani
- Edited by: Y. G. Chawhan
- Music by: Ravi
- Production company: Guru Dutt Films
- Distributed by: Guru Dutt Films
- Release date: 1960
- Country: India
- Language: Hindi

Chaudhvin Ka Chand (transl. Full Moon) is a 1960 Indian Hindi-language romance drama film directed by M. Sadiq. Produced by Guru Dutt, the film centers on a love triangle between Aslam (Guru Dutt), Jameela (Waheeda Rehman) and Nawab Pyare Miyan (Rehman). The film features music by Ravi.

The film was a commercial success at the box-office, and became one of the highest-grossing Hindi films of the year. It was ranked #28 in 2003 Outlook Magazine poll of 25 Leading Indian Directors for "Best Bollywood Movies of all time". Filmfare listed it among "Seven Muslim socials you must watch". The film is considered a notable Muslim-social.

Its music album was ranked #30 in Top 100 Bollywood Albums by Film Companion website. The film's title track "Chaudhvin Ka Chand" became especially popular and is noted for picturization of the song sequence. The song is regarded as one of the most acclaimed romantic ballads in India and one of the most loved filmi songs of all time.

== Plot ==
The movie is set in a time and Muslim social circle where noble women, especially young girls, would always cover their faces out in public. Houses were divided into common and female sections where even men of family would seek permission before entering into female sections. Much confusion and plot revolve around the customary veils worn by love interest of leading men.

Aslam (Guru Dutt), Nawab Pyare Miyan (Rehman) and Mirza Musarraddique Shaida (Johnny Walker) are three childhood friends who live like brothers in Lucknow. One day Pyare Miyan accidentally sees a beautiful girl Jameela (Waheeda Rehman) in market and sets his heart to marry her. As the luck has it, Jameela is one of the guests on his sister Rehana's birthday party next week. Pyare Miyan gets hold of a piece of Jameela's veil which he hands over to their maid Naseeban (Tun Tun) to match and bring information about the girl he adores. Meanwhile girls exchange veils (dupatta) as a sisterhood tradition. Jameela exchanges her veil with her friend Bano, to whom Naseeban matches the torn piece and reports about her origin to Pyare as she had worked at Bano's house as maid earlier. Pyare sends his friends Aslam and Shaida to Bano's house for setting the marriage but her father asks for some time to think about it.

Meanwhile Pyare Miyan's mother (Mumtaz Begum) who dreams to perform Hajj, is forbidden by doctor. An Imam suggests to send someone else in her place as it's permitted in Islam. The family asks Imam to go instead but he is hesitant as he wants his young daughter to get married before going. Pyare Miyan's mother wants Pyare Miyan to marry Imam's daughter, but Pyare Miyan is unknown of the fact that Imam's daughter is none other than Jameela and in order to avoid him getting entangled with Imam's daughter, Pyare Miyan first asks Shaida to marry Jameela and when Shaida refuses as he likes Tameezan (Minoo Mumtaz), thereafter he asks Aslam to marry Jameela, which Aslam accepts without even asking anything about Jameela. Pyare Miyan, too, attends the marriage of Aslam and Jameela, but face of Jameela does not get revealed to Pyare Miyan. So, unknowingly, Pyare Miyan himself get the girl he loves married to his friend.

On the other side, Pyare Miyan's rendezvous with Bano is set by Naseeban, it's when he realises that Bano is not the girl he wanted to marry. Pyare also gets a good beating by Bano's house guards who take him as thief. Trio sets to find out the girl again and go to the market next day. Jameela runs into Aslam's cousin Naseem there and both along with other woman notice Pyare Miyan at their tail and to dodge him they again exchange their veil. Pyare Miyan and Aslam reach Naseem's house who has exchanged Jameela's veil. Upon finding out that Naseem is in fact Aslam's cousin, their marriage is set, again Pyare has not seen his bride to be.

One day, Pyare Miyan goes to Aslam's house to deliver a necklace for Naseem but accidentally runs into Jameela who is sitting in the common section of house as their maid is cleaning her room. Pyare Miyan takes her as Naseem and tells Aslam about the incident also hands him the necklace. Aslam comes home to meet Naseem and get her opinion on the necklace. It's then he finds out that Jameela is the girl his friend is madly in love with. The revelation tore him apart as he feels divided between love for his friend and wife. Still to confirm it, he takes Jameela's photo to Pyare Miyan who is overjoyed upon seeing the photo, confirming his fear.

Aslam decides to distant himself from Jameela to lead their marriage towards divorce. He starts visiting Tameezan's (Minoo Mumtaz) "Kotha" regularly where he is caught by Shaida who arrived there to invite Tameezan for Pyare Miyan's wedding. Jameela's brother confronts Aslam who wants him to divorce their sister and so that they can marry her off to Pyare Miyan. Aslam sees his plan working, he further angers his brothers-in-law. As they proceed to kill Aslam, Jameela, who is under the impression that Aslam is suspicious about her and Pyare Miyan, pledges her loyalty to her husband.

Aslam loads his revolver and plans to kill himself at the wedding. He asks Jameela to wear their wedding dress and praises her. Pyare Miyan arrives at their home and realises his mistake. He rushes back to his home and asks his mother to stop the wedding. Under the burden of guilt of showing his affection for his friend's wife in front of him, he swallows the diamond. Aslam breaks the door to enter the room as he breaths his last. Jameela arrives and unveils her face, but Aslam covers her face.

In last scene, Aslam and Shaida are praying at Pyare Miyan's grave.

== Cast ==
- Guru Dutt as Aslam
- Waheeda Rehman as Jameela
- Rehman as Nawab Pyare Miyan
- Johnny Walker as Mirza Musarraddique Shaida
- Minoo Mumtaz as Tameezan
- Mumtaz Begum as Nawab's Mother
- Tun Tun as Naseeban

== Music ==
Guru Dutt's music composer of earlier films S. D. Burman had warned him not to make Kaagaz Ke Phool (1959), which resembled his own life. When Guru Dutt insisted on making the film, Burman said that would be his last film with Guru Dutt. Hence, the music composing of this film was offered to composer Ravi and was critically acclaimed, and the lyrics by Shakeel Badayuni. The title song is sung by Mohammed Rafi. The other hit songs from this film are "Mera Yaar Bana Hai Dulha", also sung by Mohammed Rafi, often played in wedding ceremony and mujra song "Dil Ki Kahani Rang Layi Hai", sung by Asha Bhosle.

=== Track listing ===
Ravi has composed the music of the film and Shakeel Badayuni wrote the lyrics.

Song	Singer	Raga
"Chaudhvin Ka Chand Ho"	Mohammed Rafi	Pahadi
"Mili Khaak Mein Mohabbat"	Mohammed Rafi	
"Mera Yaar Bana Hai Dulha"	Mohammed Rafi	
"Yeh Duniya Gol Hai"	Mohammed Rafi	
"Yeh Lakhnau Ki Sarzameen"	Mohammed Rafi	
"Balam Se Milan Hoga, Sharmaane Ke Din Aaey"	Geeta Dutt	
"Badle Badle Mere Sarkar Nazar Aatey Hain"	Lata Mangeshkar	
"Sharmake Yeh Kyun Sab Pardanasheen Aanchal Ko Sanwara Kartein Hain"	Shamshad Begum, Asha Bhosle	
"Dil Ki Kahani Rang Layi Hai"	Asha Bhosle	
"Bedardi Mere Saiyan, Shabnam Hain Kabhi Sholay"	Asha Bhosle	

== Release ==
The film was selected into the 2nd Moscow International Film Festival.

In 2014, the film's screenplay was published as a book, titled Chaudhvin Ka Chand: The Original Screenplay, by the film historians Dinesh Raheja and Jitendra Kothari.

== Reception ==
After the box office failure of Kaagaz Ke Phool, Guru Dutt ventured into the idea of producing a commercial project to protect his studio from ruin. Chaudhvin ka Chand was a successful comeback film for Dutt and saved Dutt's production studio.

== Awards ==
8th Filmfare Awards:

Won

- Best Lyricist – Shakeel Badayuni for film "Chaudhvin Ka Chand"
- Best Male Playback Singer – Mohammed Rafi for film "Chaudhvin Ka Chand"
- Best Art Direction – Biren Nag

Nominated

- Best Supporting Actor – Rehman
- Best Music Director – Ravi
- Best Story – Saghir Usmani
