= Dinesh Raheja =

Indian author, columnist, TV scriptwriter, film historian

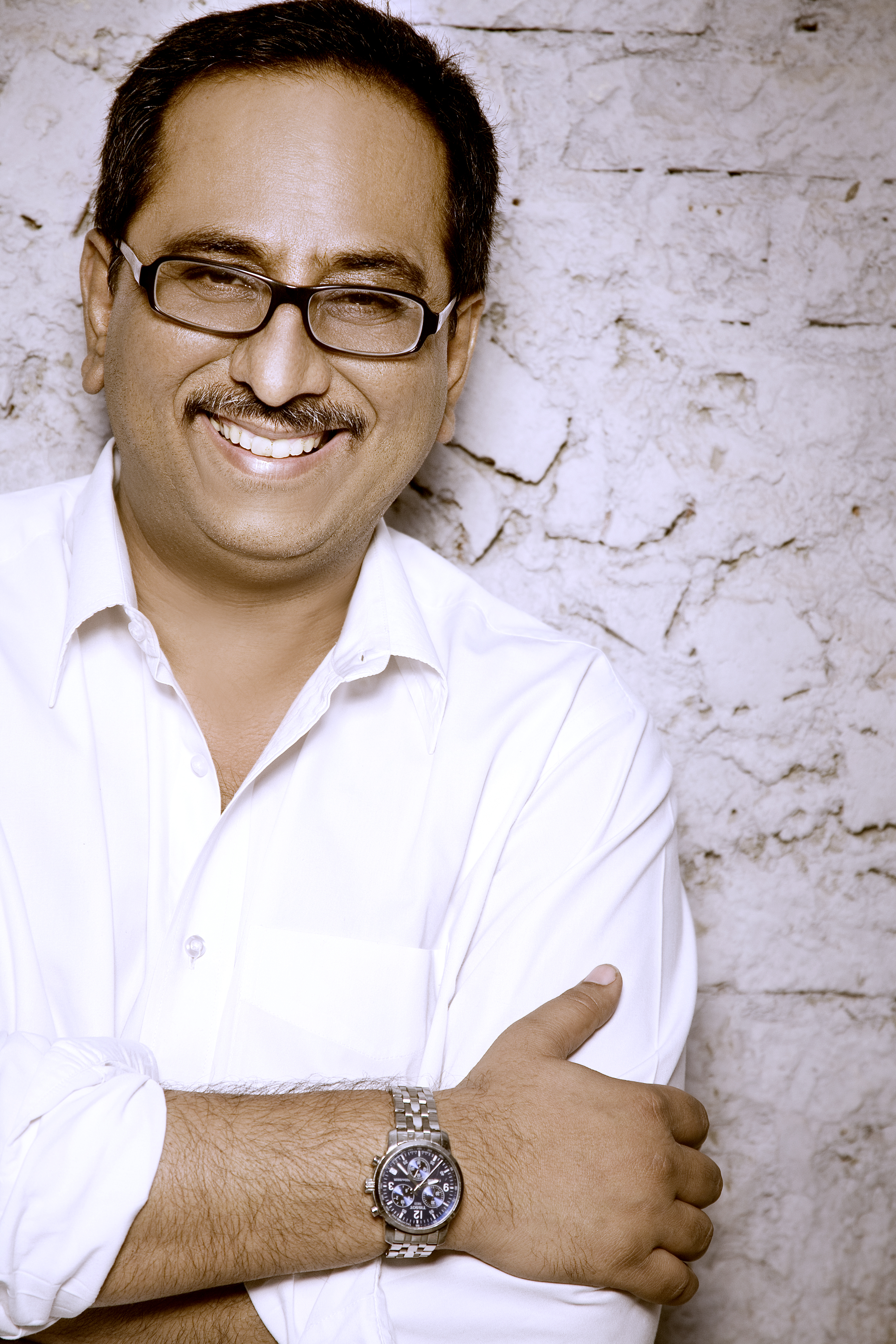
- Born: 31 March 1957 (age 69); Mumbai, Maharastra, India
- Education: Palm Beach School, Mumbai and HR College, Mumbai
- Occupations: Author, Columnist, TV Screenwriter and Film Historian.
- Years active: 1982–present
- Notable work: Author of The Hundred Luminaries of Hindi Cinema Indian Cinema The Bollywood Saga, Sahib Bibi Aur Ghulam – The Original Screenplay, 'Chaudhvin Ka Chand – The Original Screenplay', 'Kaagaz Ke Phool – The Original Screenplay', writer of TV serials Just Mohabbat, Kasamh Se, non-fiction TV show, Film India (host Victor Banerjee).
- Relatives: Mishal Raheja (nephew)

Dinesh Raheja (born 31 March 1957) is an Indian author, columnist, TV scriptwriter, film historian. Raheja has been writing on cinema for over 40 years. In his long and prolific career as a writer, he has worked as the Editor of Movie magazine (1988–1999), Channel Editor of India Today's online film section and Editor of Bollywood News Service. He has been a regular columnist for rediff.com and Sunday Mid-day for over a decade and his articles have been published in The Times of India, The Indian Express, The Hindustan Times, India Today and Outlook. Raheja is a committed film historian and has authored five books: The Hundred Luminaries of Hindi Cinema (1996), Indian Cinema, The Bollywood Saga (2004), Sahib Bibi Aur Ghulam: The Original Screenplay (2012), Chaudhvin Ka Chand: The Original Screenplay (2014) and Kaagaz Ke Phool – The Original Screenplay (2015).

Raheja also writes for TV (Just Mohabbat (fiction), Kasamh Se (fiction), and the BBC World TV show, Film India) and pens poems in English and Hindi, which have been published in several magazines and newspapers. In 2017 Raheja initiated THE DINESH RAHEJA WORKSHOP in which he teaches Bollywood aspirants everything related to the media including the art of image building and giving interviews. In August 2017, he has also released his first book of poems, '101 Haiku by Dinesh Raheja'. The Rock With DR YouTube Channel is Dinesh Raheja's latest initiative

== Education and early career ==
Raheja was born to a Sindhi business family in Mumbai. His father Bhagwandas Raheja was a finance broker and his mother Janki a housewife. Raheja graduated from Palm Beach High School, Napean Sea Road, in December 1973 and from HR College of Commerce in 1978. Raised on a staple diet of two films a week, he showed a proclivity for the arts from an early age and, while still a reader, began writing about films for magazines such as Filmfare, Star and Style and Cine Blitz. He often won small sums of Rs 100 in contests for the Best Letter of the Month. Interviews with Hema Malini and Zeenat Aman were published, based on his questions as a reader.

After a half-hearted attempt at pursuing chartered accountancy, Raheja embraced the true calling of his life in 1982 and embarked on a career in film journalism. He began writing on films first for the monthly magazine, Cine Blitz, though this was preceded by a short stint as a reporter with The Daily newspaper.

== Milestones as an editor ==
Rising quickly through the ranks, he was the chief reporter of Cine Blitz by the time he left in September 1988. Thereafter, he became the editor of Movie magazine at the young age of 31. He has conducted analytical, in-depth interviews with most of the leading lights of the Hindi film industry including Dilip Kumar, Dev Anand, Amitabh Bachchan, Rajesh Khanna, Rishi Kapoor, Mithun Chakraborty, Anil Kapoor, Jackie Shroff, Sunny Deol, Rekha, Sridevi, Madhuri Dixit, Dimple Kapadia, Ram Gopal Varma, Mahesh Bhatt, Mukul Anand and Subhash Ghai.

Over the next decade, Raheja had a golden run at the magazine, and embarked on several innovative ventures. Recognising the demand for high-quality visuals of the stars, Raheja simultaneously edited several issues of Postermag and Classic Postcards. These were released by the stars who featured in them (Aamir Khan, Amitabh Bachchan etc.).

The innovative features in Movie magazine included the 'Dial A Star Scheme' (you could talk to your favourite film star on a pre-advertised date; Juhi Chawla was the first to speak to her fans and was followed by Sanjay Dutt, Anil Kapoor, Madhuri Dixit among several others) and 'Movie Goes Mad' (a cartoon series that became hugely popular). Raheja's witty spoofs on films, which were then illustrated, included a takeoff on the superhit Dilwale Dulhania Le Jayenge.

Raheja's most famous covers for Movie magazine include his first cover that featured then rising star Aamir Khan alongside contemporaneous box-office queen Sridevi; a body-painted picture of Pooja Bhatt, and the momentous cover when two megastars Amitabh Bachchan and Rajesh Khanna came together for a photo-session and a joint interview that ran into reams of print.

His annual feature for the magazine, 'The Movie Opinion Poll,' which let the public vote for 'The Best Actor' and 'The Best Actress' among 40 categories, inspired many clones. Raheja also conducted an auction of star paraphernalia, 'Forever Yours,' which included Shammi Kapoor's chess set, Raj Kapoor's tweed coat, Juhi Chawla's pillow and Madhuri's dhak dhak outfit from Beta, the proceeds of which were handed over to Cheshire Homes, an old-age home.

== Books on cinema ==
In 1996, after a cover story on The Hundred Luminaries Of Hindi Cinema, he was asked by Padmini Mirchandani of IBH, the publisher of Movie magazine, to give it the shape of a book. Amitabh Bachchan launched the book in Mumbai, and subsequently Rekha, Anil Kapoor and Sridevi launched it in other places.

Raheja has collaborated with Jitendra Kothari on four other books on cinema: Indian Cinema, The Bollywood Saga (Roli Books), Sahib Bibi Aur Ghulam: The Original Screenplay, Chaudhvin Ka Chand: The Original Screenplay (2014) and Kaagaz Ke Phool – The Original Screenplay (Om Books).

== Creative pursuits ==
Ayaz Memon, the editor of Mid-Day in the mid '90s, enthused Raheja to write a personalised column for the Sunday paper; and later, an analytical box-office think piece on a weekday. Raheja remained a columnist with Mid-Day for an unbroken stint of 13 years (1996 to 2009).

For television, Raheja has written the concept for Tony And Deeya Singh's Just Mohabbat and was one of the prominent writers on Ekta Kapoor's Kasamh Se (2006). UTV asked him to write two seasons of the BBC show, Film India (hosted by Victor Banerjee).

He is married to Anita whom he met in December 1982. Anita Raheja is a popular food columnist and author of two bestselling books, Simply Sumptuous Sindhi Cooking and High Tea And Kitty Party Recipes. They have a daughter, Nikita Raheja, better known as Nikita Mohanty in the film industry for her work as a costume stylist for films such as English Vinglish, Two States, Humpty Sharma Ki Dulhania and Kapoor & Sons.

Raheja has initiated a debate group 'Let's Talk Over Chai,' in which professionals from all strands of life—writing, modelling, playback singing, photography, film direction – participate. In consonance with his belief in the need to connect, Raheja, in his spare time, teaches English to the less privileged.

== List of works ==
=== Books ===
- The Hundred Luminaries of Hindi Cinema (1996)
- Indian Cinema The Bollywood Saga (2003)
- Sahib Bibi Aur Ghulam: The Original Screenplay (2012)
- Chaudhvin Ka Chand: The Original Screenplay (2014)
- Kaagaz Ke Phool: The Original Screenplay (2014)
- 101 Haiku by Dinesh Raheja (2017)

=== TV serials ===
- Just Mohabbat (fiction)
- Kasamh Se (fiction)
- Film India (a film review show hosted by Victor Banerjee)
- Ek Se Badhkar Ek (Countdown Show)

=== Journalism ===
- Reporter, Cine Blitz (1982 to 1988)
- Editor, Movie (1988 to 1999)
- Channel Manager, India Today Online (2001)
- Editor, Bollywood News Service (2007 to 2016)
