= Dil Ne Phir Yaad Kiya (1966 film) =

- Poster
- Directed by: C. L. Rawal
- Written by: G.L. Rawal
- Produced by: B.L. Rawal
- Starring: Dharmendra; Nutan
- Cinematography: Taru Dutt
- Edited by: Pran Mehra
- Music by: Master Sonik; Om Prakash Sharma
- Release date: 1966
- Country: India
- Language: Hindi

Dil Ne Phir Yaad Kiya (transl. The heart reminded once more) is a 1966 Bollywood romantic drama film directed by C. L. Rawal. It stars Nutan, Dharmendra, Rehman and Jeevan. The music is by Sonik Omi. It has Nutan in a double role.

== Plot ==
The story of the eternal friendship between two men. City-based Ashok, who works as a Salesman in a toy store, has always dreamt of marrying village-based Ashoo. He is a close friend of his co-worker, Amjad, whose marriage is being finalized with Shabnam. Ashok goes to the village to meet and get Ashoo to marry him but finds she has been abducted by his brother, Bhagat, who had earlier killed her brother, Bhagwan. Ashok manages to rescue her and they flee from Bhagat and his goons in order to try and reach Amjad's wedding ceremony. Amjad is ready to even postpone the wedding in order to give Ashok enough time to make it but nothing will prepare him for the shock when he gets the news that the train Ashok and Ashoo were traveling in has met with an accident with very few survivors.

Amjad locates Ashok but Ashoo has died in the accident. Coincidentally, Shabnam looks exactly like Ashoo and Amjad asks Shabnam to pretend to be Ashoo and help Ashok to recover. Shabnam reluctantly agrees but Ashok, who is unaware of Ashoo's death, is frustrated to see that Ashoo no longer loves him like before. Will he realize Amjad's love for him and will Shabnam ever gain her husband's love? The film ends with the answers to these questions.

== Cast ==
- Nutan as Ashoo/Shabnam
- Dharmendra as Ashok
- Rehman as Amjad
- Jeevan as Bhagat
- I. S. Johar as Bhagwan
- Laxmi Chhaya as Dancer
- Sunder as Aashiq
- Tun Tun as Premkali
- Bela Bose as Honey

The music direction for this film was by the debutante music composer duo Sonik Omi whereas the lyrics for all the songs were by G.L. Rawal.

== Soundtrack ==
Lyrics by: G. L. Rawal

#	Title	Singer(s)
1	"Aaja Re Pyar Pukare"	Lata Mangeshkar
2	"Dil Ne Phir Yaad Kiya"	Mohammed Rafi, Mukesh, Suman Kalyanpur
3	"Main Suraj Hoon Tu Meri Kiran"	Mohammed Rafi, Asha Bhosle
4	"Lo Chehra Surkh Sharab Hua"	Mohammed Rafi
5	"Hamen To Khushi Hai"	Asha Bhosle
6	"Kaliyon Ne Ghunghat Khole"	Mohammed Rafi
7	"Yeh Dil Hai Mohabbat Ka Pyasa"	Mukesh
8	"Yun Chaal Chalo Na Matwali"	Mohammed Rafi
9	"Humne Jalwa Dikhaya To Jal Jaoge"	Manna Dey, Asha Bhosle
10	"Main To Naina Ladake"	Usha Khanna, Usha Mangeshkar, Krishna Kalle
