= The Bollywood Saga =

Indian Cinema: The Bollywood Saga
- Book cover
- Author: Dinesh Raheja; Jitendra Kothari
- Language: English
- Subject: Film, Bollywood
- Genre: Non-fiction
- Publisher: Aurum Press
- Publication date: 2004
- Publication place: India
- Pages: 155
- ISBN: 9781845130169

Indian Cinema: The Bollywood Saga (ISBN 9781845130169) is a 155-page book overviewing the history of Bollywood published in 2004. It was written by Dinesh Raheja and Jitendra Kothari, with a foreword by Ismail Merchant.

== Content ==
The book is a chronicle of Bollywood, the Hindi film industry, from its inception with Raja Harishchandra in 1913 to its status as a major global entertainment force. The book details the significant technological innovations and industry developments that have occurred over the decades, contributing to Bollywood's growth. Additionally, it includes rare archival photos collected from across the country. It also features pen-portraits of notable actors, trade details, and interviews with prominent film personalities.

The book follows a chronological structure, documenting each significant period and key milestones in the history of Hindi films. It covers the Silent film era, the introduction of sound, the transition to color films, and the development of iconic classics. Additionally, it examines the modern era characterized by high-budget productions that blend artistic and commercial elements.

=== Table of Contents ===
Foreword	9
The Bollywood Saga 1913-2003	13
The Silent Era 1913-1920s	15
The Unleashing of Sound 1930s	25
Ascending the Growth Curve 1940s	39
The Gilded Age 1950s	49
Colourful Escapism 1960s	67
The Decade of Rebellion 1970s	87
Pockets of Grace 1980s	103
Going Retro 1990s	117
The Post-Millennial Period	133
Significant Films 1930-2003	148
Index	152

== Reception ==
Notable journalist and editor-at-large for India Today, Kaveree Bamzai, remarks on certain romantics of the early Bollywood era and the ways in which they came to form the early aesthetics of Indian cinema. She states that authors Raheja and Kothari "don't give the answers because they are not equipped to do so. But that is not such a bad thing. This is a book to be taken as bracing medicine." Vikrant Kishore, in a paper on the evolution of heroine archetypes throughout Indian cinema, talks about the glamorization and appeal of sexualized Western-centric female leads, particularly after the 1960s when the medium of film was exiting its silent, black-and-white period. He cites Raheja and Kothari for aptly summing up some of the changes that occurred in the way that women were treated and portrayed on screen.
