= Kaagaz Ke Phool =

1959 film

- Directed by: Guru Dutt
- Screenplay by: Abrar Alvi
- Starring: Guru Dutt; Waheeda Rehman; Kumari Naaz; Mehmood; Johnny Walker
- Cinematography: V. K. Murthy
- Edited by: Y. G. Chawhan
- Music by: S. D. Burman
- Production company: Guru Dutt Films
- Release date: 2 January 1959
- Running time: 148 minutes
- Country: India
- Language: Hindi

Kaagaz Ke Phool (transl. Paper Flowers) is a 1959 Indian Hindi-language romantic drama film produced and directed by Guru Dutt, who also stars in the lead role alongside Waheeda Rehman. Written by Abrar Alvi, the film follows Suresh Sinha (Dutt), a successful film director whose personal and professional life deteriorates following his separation from his family and the decline of his career. The supporting cast includes Kumari Naaz, Mehmood, Johnny Walker and Veena.

The film is notable as the first Indian film shot in CinemaScope, a widescreen format that was used to create its distinctive visual compositions. Its cinematography was handled by V. K. Murthy, a frequent collaborator of Dutt, whose use of lighting, framing and depth of field contributed significantly to the film's visual style. It was Dutt's final film as a director and one of the most technically ambitious productions of his career.

Often interpreted as a self-reflexive examination of filmmaking and the film industry, Kaagaz Ke Phool explores the relationship between artistic ambition, fame, personal relationships and creative independence. Its narrative and visual style reflect on the studio system and the precarious position of filmmakers and performers within it. The film has also attracted attention for its relationship to Dutt's own career and public image, although the extent to which its story is autobiographical has been a subject of discussion. Its soundtrack was composed by S. D. Burman, with lyrics primarily by Kaifi Azmi, and includes the songs "Waqt Ne Kiya Kya Haseen Sitam" and "Dekhi Zamaane Ki Yaari".

Upon its release, Kaagaz Ke Phool was unsuccessful both commercially and critically, and its failure had a significant impact on Dutt and his production studio. The film was subsequently reassessed by critics and film scholars, gaining recognition as a classic of Indian cinema and one of the most significant works of Dutt's career. Its cinematography, treatment of the filmmaking process and self-reflexive narrative have since made it an important subject of film scholarship.

== Synopsis ==
The film tells, in flashback, the story of Suresh Sinha, a famous film director. His marriage to Veena is on the rocks, due to her wealthy family seeing filmmaking, as a job, lacking in social status. He is also denied access to his daughter, Pammi, who is sent to a private boarding school, in Dehradun.

On a rainy night, Sinha meets a woman, Shanti, and gives her his coat. She comes to the film studio to return the coat, unintentionally disrupting the shooting, by walking in front of the camera. While reviewing the rushes, Sinha recognises her potential as a star and casts her as Paro, in Devdas. Shanti goes on to become a rage and an acclaimed star. Shanti and Suresh, two lonely people, come together. Their liaison is hotly debated in gossip columns and results in Pammi's friends tormenting her, in school. Pammi pleads with Shanti to leave Sinha's life and allow her parents' marriage another chance. Moved by Pammi's plea, Shanti throws away her career and becomes a school teacher in a small village.

Pammi decides to live with her father, who fights his in-laws in court, but loses custody of Pammi to Veena, who is now his ex-wife. Losing custody of Pammi, along with Shanti's departure from films, drives Suresh to alcohol. This marks the beginning of his downfall, both personally and professionally, in his career and consequent decline in his fortunes. Meanwhile, Shanti is forced to return to films since she has a contract with the studio. Her producer agrees to hire Suresh because of Shanti, but Suresh's self-respect will not let him return and owe his job to Shanti's star status; so she is unable to help him, as he is too far gone for redemption. In the final scene, remembering his glorious past, he dies in the director's chair in an empty film studio, a lonely and forgotten man.

== Cast ==
- Guru Dutt as Suresh Sinha
- Waheeda Rehman as Shanti
- Johnny Walker as Rakesh "Rocky" Verma (Veena's brother)
- Veena as Veena Verma Sinha (Suresh Sinha's Wife)
- Baby Naaz as Pramila Sinha "Pammi" (Suresh Sinha's Daughter)
- Mahesh Kaul as Rai Bahadur B. P. Verma (Rocky & Veena's Father)
- Pratima Devi as Mrs. Verma (Rocky & Veena's Mother)
- Minoo Mumtaz as Dr. Juliet Singh
- Ruby Myers as Sulochna Devi
- Mehmood
- Mohan Choti
- Tun Tun as Telephone operator

== Production ==
The film is widely considered to be an autobiographical reflection of Guru Dutt's personality, his deepening disillusionment with the film industry and the nature of fame it brings, and on the widely written-about alleged relationship between Dutt and his protégé, Waheeda Rehman. Dutt was married to singer Geeta Roy Chowdhuri (later Geeta Dutt) at the time, and his heavy drinking and the rumours of his passionate romance with Rehman didn't help. Others believe it to be a homage to Gyan Mukherjee (known for directing Kismet), whom Guru Dutt had joined in 1950. Waheeda Rehman has denied that the story was based on Dutt's own life, saying that Dutt had never tasted failure as all his films were successful at the time of the film's production, unlike the protagonist who suffered failure.

V. K. Murthy, a frequent collaborator of Dutt, served as the cinematographer and won the Filmfare Best Cinematographer Award for his work on the film. M. R. Acharekar, the art director, went on to receive the Filmfare Award for Best Art Direction. Bhanu Athaiya, who would later receive an Academy Award for Gandhi (1982), handled the costume design. Ramnord Research Labs, headed by S. V. Rau, did the final film processing.

In an interview filmed for Khalid Mohammed's 2025 documentary, "The Master", Shyam Benegal recounts that this film was originally shot with a different cast, and upon a lukewarm reception during a preview screening for some of his director friends, Guru Dutt reshot it in its entirety with a different cast.

== Soundtrack ==
Kaagaz Ke Phool

Soundtrack album by S. D. Burman
- Released: January 2, 1959
- Genres: Filmi, Bollywood
- Length: 33:18
- Label: Saregama

The music of the movie was composed by S. D. Burman. Burman had warned Dutt not to make Kaagaz Ke Phool, which resembled his own life. When Guru Dutt insisted on making the film, Burman said that that it would be his last film with Guru Dutt.

The song Waqt Ne Kiya Kya Haseen Sitam became an evergreen hit and one of the most loved Hindi-film songs of all time. In 2006, it was ranked #3 in the "20 Best Hindi Film Songs Ever" poll of 30 leading music composers, singers, and lyricists. Apart from the song's composition and lyrics, it is also considered one of the best photographed songs of all time. The light-beam effect was produced using two large mirrors and natural sunlight.

All music is composed by S. D. Burman

No.	Title	Lyrics	Singer(s)	Length
1.	"Title Music"	-	-	2:02
2.	"Dekhi Zamane Ki Yaari, Bichhde Sabhi Baari Baari (Raga Des)"	Kaifi Azmi	Mohammed Rafi	9:00
3.	"San San San Woh Chali Hawa"	Kaifi Azmi	Mohammed Rafi, Asha Bhosle	4:13
4.	"Ud Ja Ud Ja Pyaase Bhanware"	Kaifi Azmi	Mohammed Rafi	3:21
5.	"Hum Tum Jise Kahta Hai"	Shailendra	Mohammed Rafi	4:13
6.	"Ek Do Teen Char Aur Paanch"	Kaifi Azmi	Geeta Dutt	3:24
7.	"Ulte Seedhe Dao Lagaye"	Kaifi Azmi	Mohammed Rafi, Asha Bhosle	3:31
8.	"Waqt Ne Kiya Kya Haseen Sitam"	Kaifi Azmi	Geeta Dutt	3:31
Total length:				33:18

== Release and reception ==
The commercial and critical failure of Kaagaz Ke Phool was an intense disappointment for Dutt. He had invested a great deal of love, money, and energy in this film. All subsequent films from his studio were, thereafter, officially helmed by other directors since Dutt felt that his name was anathema to box office.

In the writing of Sathya Saran's book Ten Years with Guru Dutt: Abrar Alvi’s Journey, Abrar Alvi, who wrote the screenplay and dialogues of Kaagaz Ke Phool, told Saran that he believed the masses could not identify with Suresh's trauma over his personal heartbreak and his lack of professional creative freedom, given that he was reasonably well off and he still had a job, while they struggled to put two meals on their table. He believed viewers could not feel for what they saw as the self-indulgent angst of a privileged man.

=== Home video ===
Yash Raj Films released a commemorative DVD of the movie. Included in the special features is a three-part documentary produced by Channel 4 in the United Kingdom on the life and works of Guru Dutt, In Search of Guru Dutt. His close associates and some of his family members remember him, his life and work. There is also a tribute to Geeta Dutt by Lata Mangeshkar, in which she sings "Waqt Ne Kiya Kya Haseen Sitam".

== Legacy ==
In the 2002 Sight & Sound critics and directors' poll, Kaagaz Ke Phool was ranked #160 in the list of greatest films of all time. It was listed in British Film Institute's Top 20 Indian Films in 2002 at #11;

NDTV's listed it in "India's 20 greatest films", citing, "Kaagaz Ke Phool, Guru Dutt's most melancholic film ever, takes his deepening disillusionment with the world and its guardians to a new level of despair. The iconic actor-director plays a filmmaker on the skids. He is unable to get his point of view across to the people who matter and life is a constant struggle, both personally and professionally. The masses failed to connect with the film, but Kaagaz Ke Phool has lived longer than many money-spinners of the golden era of Hindi cinema." It was listed in CNN-IBN's 100 Greatest Indian Films of all time in 2013. It was ranked #6 in Outlook Magazine poll of the 25 leading Indian directors for Hindi cinema's best films in 2003. It was also listed in Time-Out "The 100 Best Bollywood Movies" in 2015 at #14.

Kaagaz Ke Phool's screenplay was published in 2014 as a book as Kaagaz Ke Phool: The Original Screenplay.

In 2019, British Film Institute named Kaagaz Ke Phool as the Best Musical of 1959, citing, “if proof were needed that Guru Dutt was no one-hit-wonder, it's right here.” It was ranked first in The Cinemaholic's list of "Best Hindi Cult Films that were Flops", citing, “The last film officially directed by the legendary Guru Dutt. Often regarded as one of the greatest film ever made, the failure of Kaagaz Ke Phool severely impacted Guru Dutt.”

In an article regarding the film, the University of IOWA, summed up, “Flaws and all, Kagaz Ke Phool deserves to rank—with Fellini's 8½—among the all-time great films about filmmaking and life.”

Kaagaz Ke Phool significantly serves the plot of 2022 film Chup: Revenge of the Artist.

== Awards ==
- Filmfare Best Cinematographer Award – V. K. Murthy
- Filmfare Best Art Direction Award – M. R. Acharekar
