= Gabbar Singh =

Gabbar Singh may refer to:

- Gabbar Singh (character), a character in the 1975 Indian Bollywood film Sholay
  - Gabbar Singh (track), a dialogue track from the film's soundtrack
- Gabbar Singh, titular character, played by Akshay Kumar, of the 2015 Indian Bollywood film Gabbar Is Back
- Gabbar Singh (film), a 2012 Indian Telugu-language film
  - Sardaar Gabbar Singh, a 2016 Indian Telugu-language film, sequel of Gabbar Singh
- Gabbar Singh (field hockey) (born 1978), Indo-Canadian field hockey player
- Gabar Singh Negi (1893–1915), Indian soldier and recipient of the Victoria Cross
- Gabbar Singh Gujjar (1926–1959), Indian dacoit, the basis for the fictional character

== See also ==
- Gabar (disambiguation)
- Gabra (disambiguation)
