= Gabra =

Gabra may refer to:

- The Gabra people of eastern Africa
- Gabra (village), village in Western Bulgaria, part of Elin Pelin Municipality, Sofia Province
- Gabra Manfas Qeddus, Ethiopian Christian saint, and the founder of the monastery of Zuqualla
- Gabra Mika'el, Roman Catholic martyr and associate of saint Giustino de Jacobis
- Gawdat Gabra (born 1947), Coptologist
- Sami Gabra, Egyptologist
- Gabra, Khartoum, one of the neighbourhoods of Khartoum, Sudan
- Gabbar Singh Gujjar or Gabra Singh, an Indian dacoit (gangster)

== See also ==
- Gabbar Singh (disambiguation)
