= Sexism in Bollywood =

Sexism in Bollywood refers to gender discrimination and stereotyping in the Hindi film industry, also known as Bollywood. This includes the portrayal of women in films and their roles in film making.

== Representation ==
=== Early era (1920s–1960s) ===
Female roles for films during these times were often limited towards roles such as mothers, romantic interests, or the wife of the male lead. Rather than being an active character, their purpose was only for looks. The ones who did defy gender norms were depicted as mistresses, vamps, club-dancers, and had habits like smoking, drinking, or expressed their sexuality and sexual interest which were also highlighted by their clothing to distinguish "good" and “not-so-good” women.

Early Bollywood films in the 1920s were often also influenced by European films and Hollywood. Director Himanshu Rai used Eurasian women as substitutes as they had lighter skin to show an ideal look for Indian women. Actresses also promoted skin lightening products, further increasing colourism within female communities.

The 1950s enforced the beliefs that women were submissive, sacrificial, and morally upright in addition to being portrayed as duly servants towards their family or partner. A study showed male-coded pronouns were used more than female-coded pronouns during this period.

=== 1970s–1980s ===
Portrayal of women in this period leaned more towards idealistic rather than realistical approach. Films such as Mother India, Sujata, Jai Santoshi Maa and Seeta Aur Geeta presented such tropes.

Portrayals of damsel in distress tropes, item numbers and sexualization of women still occurred, with it being the main themes to garner more attention towards the films. The male gaze was also a prominently used in the films, often depicting paler-skinned women in revealing shots.

=== 1990s-present ===
Changes were made to women's role during the 1990s, as they were represented as individual figures while still being an accessory for men. Films including Munni and Chikni Chameli still portrayed women as sexual object. Films like Saajan Chale Sasural, Biwi No.1, and Gharwali Baharwali justified a man's sexual desires being a fault of their partner.

Stalking was also normalized in Hindi films, with examples including Ae Dil Hai Mushkil, Badrinath ki Dulhania, Raanjhanaa, Tere Naam, Saawariya, and Tanu Weds Manu Returns even romantizing the act. Rape also became a frequently used plot device. Heroes would be given the motivation when a women of close regards to them was threaten by rape and ultimately made the female characters become a one-dimensional figure to strengthen the narrative of the stories.

The early 2000s marked a change in women's role in Bollywood. Directors including Zoya Akhtar and Farah Khan helped in changing perspectives on women in Hindi cinema, with the latter producing Om Shanti Om which became the highest grossing Hindi film of 2007. Producers like Mira Nair, Meghna Gulzar, and Gauri Shinde also focused on adding more women to lead roles. Films like Lipstick Under My Burkha, Anarkali Of Arah, A Death In The Gunj, Gangubai Kathiawadi, Thappad, and Piku also defied gender norms with women being shown more strong and independent.

== Gender disparities ==
=== Pay gap ===
Numerous Bollywood actresses have spoken out about the significant pay disparity in the industry, as male actor get paid more than female actors by a big margin. Lara Dutta and Sonam Kapoor said that actresses are often paid only one-tenth of what male actors earn. Kriti Sanon also noted the significant pay gap, in which some male actors earn ten times more than their female co-stars. Others which have voiced their concerns on the pay disparity also include Madhuri Dixit, Bhumi Pednekar, Deepika Padukone, Priyanka Chopra, Saif Ali Khan and Kunal Kemmu.

== See also ==
- Rape in India
- Sexual harassment of women in India
