= Gunga Jumna =

1961 film by Nitin Bose

- Film poster
- Directed by: Nitin Bose; Dilip Kumar (ghost director)
- Written by: Wajahat Mirza (dialogue)
- Screenplay by: Dilip Kumar
- Story by: Dilip Kumar
- Produced by: Dilip Kumar
- Starring: Dilip Kumar; Vyjayanthimala; Nasir Khan
- Cinematography: V. Babasaheb
- Edited by: Das Dhaimade; Hrishikesh Mukherjee
- Music by: Naushad
- Production companies: Mehboob Studio; Filmistan
- Distributed by: Citizen Films
- Release date: 1961
- Running time: 178 minutes
- Country: India
- Language: Hindi
- Box office: est. ₹11.27 crore ($23.63 million)

Ganga Jamna (ISO 15919: Gaṅgā Jamunā), also transliterated as Ganga Jamuna or Gunga Jumna, is a 1961 Indian crime drama film, written and produced by Dilip Kumar, and directed by Nitin Bose, with dialogues written by Wajahat Mirza; Kumar later said that he also ghost-directed and edited the film. It stars Dilip Kumar with Vyjayanthimala and his real-life brother Nasir Khan in the leading roles and its rustic setting, being a defining example of the dacoit film genre. It was ranked 11th in Outlook Magazine's poll considering 25 leading Indian directors' vote for Bollywood's greatest films in 2003.

After six months of delay, the film was finally released in January 1961. It was one of the biggest hits of the 1960s and one of the most successful Indian films in terms of box office collection, domestically in India and overseas in the Soviet Union, with an estimated footfall of over 84 million tickets sold worldwide. According to various accounts, it is still among the 10 highest grossing Indian films of all time, adjusted for ticket-price inflation. In 2011, with an adjusted net gross of 736 crore, the film was ranked at number 2 by Box Office India magazine behind Mughal-e-Azam (1960) and ahead of Sholay (1975) in their list of "Top 50 Film of Last 50 Years" which feature all-time highest-grossing Bollywood films adjusted to gold-price inflation, which according to the magazine was a relatively more appropriate method for comparison.

Upon release it was nominated in seven categories at the 9th Filmfare Awards, including Best Film and Best Director for Kumar and Bose, respectively, while winning three, Best Actress for Vyjayanthimala, Best Cinematography for V. Balasaheb and Best Dialogue Writer for Wajahat Mirza. It also emerged as the biggest winner at the 25th Bengal Film Journalists' Association Awards, where it won nine awards in the Hindi film category. In addition, the film also won Certificate of Merit at the 9th National Film Awards. It also won prizes at international film festivals, including the Boston International Film Festival and the Karlovy Vary International Film Festival.

The film was a trendsetter in Indian cinema and inspired numerous filmmakers. Dilip Kumar's performance as Ganga is considered one of the finest acting performances in the history of Indian cinema, and inspired future generations of Indian actors, most notably Amitabh Bachchan who called it "the ultimate performance". In the West, artists like Academy Award winner Sophia Loren were profoundly influenced by his performance. For his performance, Kumar also received the "Special Honour Diploma" as an actor from the Czechoslovak Academy of Arts, Prague. The film's plot also inspired screenwriter duo Salim–Javed, who wrote scripts exploring similar themes in later Bachchan-starring hits such as Deewaar (1975), Amar Akbar Anthony (1977) and Trishul (1978). Ganga Jamna also had South Indian remakes, including the Tamil film Iru Thuruvam (1971) and the Malayalam film Lava (1980).

== Synopsis ==
The film is set in the fictional village of Haripur in the Gonda district of the Awadh region of Uttar Pradesh and is based on conflicting characters of two brothers, Ganga and Jamna. Haripur is eventually controlled by an evil landlord Hari Babu. When Ganga is framed by the landlord for a crime he did not commit, he escapes to the mountains with his girlfriend, Dhanno, and joins a band of bandits. His younger brother, Jamna, is sent to the city for his education and becomes a police officer. Years later, when Ganga is about to become a father, he decides to return to the village to ask for forgiveness. However, Jamna wants him to surrender to the police for his crimes and when Ganga refuses and tries to leave, Jamna shoots him dead. Ganga's death rendered more poignant by the fact that it was his money that paid for Jamna's education and allowed him to become a policeman.

== Plot ==
Widowed Govindi (Leela Chitnis) lives a poor lifestyle in Haripur along with two sons, Gungaram and Jumna. Ganga spends his days working with his mother as a servant in the home of the zamindar's obnoxious family while Jumna, a promising student, focuses on his schoolwork. While Jumna is studious, Gungaram is the opposite, but has a good heart and decides to use his earnings to ensure his brother gets a decent education. After her employer, Hariram, falsely accuses Govindi of theft, their house is searched, evidence is found and she is arrested. The entire village bails her out but the shock kills her. After their mother passes away, Ganga pledges to support his younger brother as they grow to adulthood.

The adult Ganga (Dilip Kumar) is a spirited and hardworking fellow, unafraid to take on the zamindar when necessary, while his brother Jumna (Nasir Khan) is more measured and cautious. Ganga sends Jumna to the city to study, and supports him with funds that he earns driving an oxcart and making deliveries for the zamindar. But things get complicated when Ganga saves a local girl, Dhanno (Vyjayanthimala), from the zamindar's lecherous assault. The zamindar (Anwar Hussain) gets his revenge by trumping up a robbery charge against Ganga, landing him in prison. Upon his release, Ganga learns that his brother has become destitute and attacks and robs the zamindar in a rage. Soon Ganga finds himself an outlaw, and, with Dhanno at his side, he joins a gang of bandits camping out in the wilderness. In the meantime, Jumna meets a fatherly police officer (Nazir Hussain) and becomes a police officer himself. It isn't long before Jumna's professional wanderings take him back to the village of his birth, where he must square off against his outlaw brother in a showdown between duty and family.

== Cast ==
- Dilip Kumar as Gangaram "Ganga"
  - Ram Kumar as Young Gangaram
- Vyjayanthimala as Dhanno
  - Kumari Naaz as Young Dhanno
- Nasir Khan as Jamna
  - Akashdeep as Young Jamna
- Azra as Kamla
  - Aruna Irani as Young Kamla
- Kanhaiyalal as Kallu
- Anwar Hussain as Hariram
- Nazir Hussain as Police Superintendent
- S. Nazir
- Leela Chitnis as Govindi
- Praveen Paul as Hariram's sister
- Helen as Courtesan (item number)

== Production ==
The film was loosely inspired by Mehboob Khan's Mother India (1957). In later interviews, Dilip Kumar said that he ghost-directed the film, as well as editing.

The film stars real-life brothers Dilip Kumar (real name Muhammad Yusuf Khan) and Nasir Khan in the roles of the brothers Ganga and Jamna, respectively.

Movie was shot in Nashik's various villages including Nandur Vaidya, Wadivarhe, and others. The plot of film is set in Haripur of Uttar Pradesh, although actual shooting was held at Igatpuri in Nashik. Captivating Kabaddi match played in the movie also refers to the Tanakpur city of Uttarakhand, which plays against the team of Ganga and gets defeated by the protagonist. Also Haldwani, gograghat, bastar, gonda and several areas of North India are mentioned by characters or appear in various scenes of the movie.

== Soundtrack ==
Ganga Jamna

Soundtrack album by Naushad
- Released: 1961
- Recorded: Kaushik
- Genre: Feature film soundtrack
- Label: His Master's Voice

Naushad chronology
Mughal-e-Azam (1960)	Ganga Jamna (1961)	Son of India (1962)

The soundtrack for the movie was composed by Naushad and the lyrics were penned by Shakeel Badayuni. The soundtrack consists of 8 songs, featuring vocals by Mohammed Rafi, Lata Mangeshkar, Asha Bhosle and Hemant Kumar.

In 2011, MSN ranked Insaaf Ki Dagar Pe at #1 in their list of Top 10 Patriotic songs in Bollywood for Gandhi Jayanti.

Song	Singer	Raag
"Dhundo Dhundo Re Sajna"	Lata Mangeshkar	Pilu
"Dagabaaz, Tori Batiyan"	Lata Mangeshkar	Pilu
"Do Hanson Ka Joda"	Lata Mangeshkar	Bhairavi
"Jhanan Ghunghar Baje"	Lata Mangeshkar	
"Nain Lad Jaihe To"	Mohammed Rafi	Khamaj
"O Chhalia Re, Chhalia Re, Man Mein Hamaar"	Mohammed Rafi, Lata Mangeshkar	
"Tora Man Bada Paapi"	Asha Bhonsle	Pahadi
"Insaaf Ki Dagar Pe"	Hemant Kumar	
"Chal Chal Ri Goriya Pi Ki Nagariya" (not included in the soundtrack)	Mohammed Rafi, Vyjayanthimala	

== Reception ==
=== Critical response ===
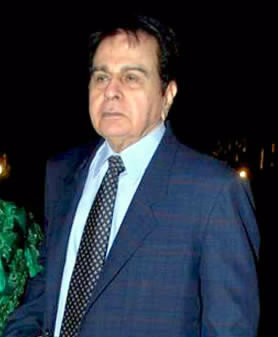
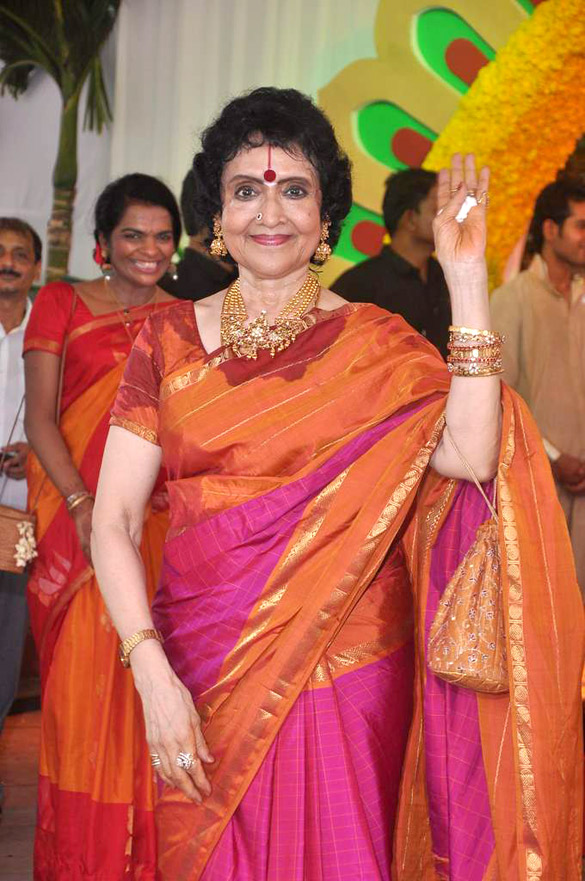
Critics particularly praised the performances by Dilip Kumar (left) and Vyjayanthimala (right).

The film has received widespread critical acclaim in India as well as overseas. Karan Bali from Upperstall.com, described it as a "well-structured and briskly paced film" adding that "notable of the use of Bhojpuri (Note: Actually Awadhi, but often confused with its neighboring dialect Bhojpuri) [sic] dialect, which helps make the film refreshingly real and gives it a proper locale and geography". Dinesh Raheja from Rediff called the film "What is also moving about Ganga Jamuna is its tragic irony [...] Of all the conundrums of human relationships that Ganga Jamuna explores, the most affecting is the one between Ganga and Dhanno --- an extraordinary love story between two ordinary people, handled with great thought and charm [...] Director Nitin Bose frames some excellent shots even while keeping a tight rein on the narrative". Deepak Mahan from The Hindu said "Gunga Jumna is a classic entertainer at its best with a powerful story, outstanding performances and riveting music [...] an eye-opener as to why good stories will always be the real "super stars" and why content must dictate the form rather than the other way round". Gaurav Malani from The Times of India gave it 3/5 stars and praised actor Dilip Kumar for his performance as Ganga. K. K. Rai from Stardust called the film "the story of two brothers on opposite sides of law repeated over and over again but never with so much power" and applauded Vyjayanthimala for her portrayal of rustic village girl Dhanno where Rai said "Vyjayanthimala’s Dhanno won her the best actress trophy[..]She played the village woman with such simplicity and grace; you’d forget she was one of the most glamorous stars of her time. She also spoke the Bhojpuri dialect like a native".

The film also gained good response from overseas. Philip Lutgendorf from University of Iowa said that "By focusing its story and its audience’s sympathies on the brother who goes astray, however, the film invites a critical and pessimistic appraisal of the state’s ability to protect the underprivileged, and its tragic central character thus anticipates the "angry" proletarian heroes popularized by Amitabh Bachchan in the 1970s [...] Linguistic coding is artfully used, with Gunga and Dhanno’s raucous arguments in colorful Bhojpuri [sic] dialect contrasted with Jumna’s carefully-measured pronouncements in Khari Boli or "high" Delhi speech. Rural life is also celebrated in exhuberant [sic] songs and dances [...] The sweeping landscape of the Deccan, with its arid mesas and lush green valleys forms a gorgeous backdrop to many scenes".

On 26 November 2008, Rediff ranked the film as one of the best 1960s Bollywood film in their "Landmark Film of 60s" list, adding that "Its massive success, not just in terms of business, but also vivid story-telling, endearing camaraderie, uncompromising technique as well as the concept of ideology at odds, has visibly influenced major motion pictures over the years, rural or contemporary backdrop, notwithstanding.".

=== Box office ===
In India, the film had a box office gross of ₹7 crore, with a nett of ₹ 3.5 crore, becoming the highest-grossing Indian film of 1961. IBOS Network gave its inflation-adjusted nett as ₹ 604.2 crore. Box Office magazine calculated its inflation-adjusted gross by comparing the collection with the price of gold in 1961, which gave it an adjusted gross of ₹ 736.4 crore in 2011, equivalent to ₹1,657 crore ($172 million) in 2016.

The film completed its Silver Jubilee theatrical run at Minerva Cinema Hall, Bombay and completed Golden Jubilee run at cinema. In 2011, the film was listed at number 2 by Box Office India magazine behind Mughal-e-Azam (1960) and ahead of Sholay (1975) in their list of "Top 50 Film of Last 50 Years" which feature all-time highest-grossing Bollywood films by using the relative price of gold in different years to arrive at a hypothetical current value of box-office collections of past films.

Overseas, the film was a success in the Soviet Union, where it released as Ганга и Джамна (Ganga i Djamna) in 1965, drawing an audience of 32.1 million viewers that year. It came number 11 on the year's Soviet box office chart, where it was the fourth highest Indian film, behind Dhool Ka Phool (number 4), Anuradha (number 8) and Jagte Raho (number 10). Ganga Jamna was one of the top 25 most successful Indian films in the Soviet Union. At an average Soviet ticket price of 25 kopecks in the mid-1960s, the film's 32.1 million sold Soviet tickets grossed an estimated 8.03 million Soviet rubles. (Note: 32.1 million Soviet tickets sold in 1965, average Soviet ticket price of 25 kopecks in the mid-1960s)

Worldwide gross (est.)
Territory	Gross revenue	Adjusted gross	Footfalls
India	₹7 crore ($14.71 million) (Note: ₹4.76 per dollar in 1961)	$158 million (₹1,169 crore)	52 million
Overseas (Soviet Union)	8.03 million руб – $8.92 million (Note: 0.9 руб per dollar from 1961 to 1971) (₹4.27 crore) (Note: ₹4.79 per dollar in 1965)	$91 million (₹457 crore)	32.1 million
Worldwide	₹11.27 crore ($23.63 million)	$255 million (₹1,874 crore)	84.1 million

== Awards ==
Award	Category	Nominee	Outcome	Note	Ref.
Bengal Film Journalists' Association Awards	Best Indian Films	Dilip Kumar	Won		
Bengal Film Journalists' Association Awards	Best Director	Nitin Bose	Won		
Bengal Film Journalists' Association Awards	Best Actor	Dilip Kumar	Won		
Bengal Film Journalists' Association Awards	Best Actress	Vyjayanthimala	Won		
Bengal Film Journalists' Association Awards	Best Music Director	Naushad	Won		
Bengal Film Journalists' Association Awards	Best Dialogue	Wajahat Mirza	Won		
Bengal Film Journalists' Association Awards	Best Lyrics	Shakeel Badayuni	Won		
Bengal Film Journalists' Association Awards	Best Cinematography	V. Babasaheb	Won		
Bengal Film Journalists' Association Awards	Best Audiography	M. I. Dharamsey	Won		
Boston International Film Festival	Paul Revere Silver Bowl	Dilip Kumar	Won	For clarity and integrity in the presentation of contemporary issues As producer	
Czechoslovak Academy of Arts, Prague	Special Honour Diploma	Dilip Kumar	Won	As actor	
9th Filmfare Awards	Best Film	Dilip Kumar	Nominated		
9th Filmfare Awards	Best Director	Nitin Bose	Nominated		
9th Filmfare Awards	Best Actor	Dilip Kumar	Nominated		
9th Filmfare Awards	Best Actress	Vyjayanthimala	Won		
9th Filmfare Awards	Best Music Director	Naushad	Nominated		
9th Filmfare Awards	Best Dialogue	Wajahat Mirza	Won		
9th Filmfare Awards	Best Cinematographer	V. Babasaheb	Won		
15th Karlovy Vary International Film Festival	India's official submission for Crystal Globe	Dilip Kumar	Not nominated		
15th Karlovy Vary International Film Festival	Special Prize	Dilip Kumar	Won	As producer and screenplay writer	
9th National Film Awards	Second Best Feature Film in Hindi	Nitin Bose; Dilip Kumar	Won		

The Hindu retrospectively criticized the 9th Filmfare Awards for snubbing Dilip Kumar from the Filmfare Award for Best Actor, which was awarded to Raj Kapoor for Jis Desh Mein Ganga Behti Hai (1961). The Hindu described it as "a strange travesty of justice" that Kumar lost out the award, after delivering "a magnificent role of a lifetime."

== Legacy ==
Ganga Jamna is regarded as an important film in the history of Indian cinema. In 1995, this movie was telecast on TV Premier for Bangladesh Television on the occasion of a personal visit by Dilip Kumar and Saira Banu in Bangladesh.

=== Remakes ===
Year	Film	Language	Cast	Director
1971	Iru Thuruvam	Tamil	Sivaji Ganesan, Padmini, R. Muthuraman	S. Ramanathan
1980	Lava	Malayalam	Prem Nazir, Madhavi, Sathaar	Hariharan

=== Story ===
Its story of two brothers on opposing sides of the law became a dominant narrative motif in Hindi cinema from the 1970s onwards. It was a trendsetter, inspiring films such as Deewaar (1975), Amar Akbar Anthony (1977) and Trishul (1978). It had a strong influence on screenwriter duo Salim–Javed, who took inspiration from Ganga Jamna when they wrote the stories and scripts of films such as Deewaar and Trishul.

Ganga Jamna's most immediate successor was Deewaar. Salim-Javed credited Ganga Jamna as the inspiration for Deewaar, which they described as a "more urban, much more contemporary" take on its themes.

Ganga Jamna was a defining example of the dacoit film genre. It went on to inspire Sholay (1975), which combined the dacoit film conventions established by Ganga Jamna and Mother India with that of the Western genre. The villain Gabbar Singh (Amjad Khan) is a dacoit speaking with a dialect inspired by Gunga, a mix of Khariboli, Awadhi and Bhojpuri, and a scene depicting an attempted train robbery was also inspired by a similar scene in Ganga Jamna.

=== Acting ===
Dilip Kumar's performance as Ganga is considered one of the finest acting performances in the history of Indian cinema. According to The Hindu:

Dilip Kumar is the "super star" as he essays a character that blends rustic comedy, romance, tragedy and villainy in a magnificent role of a lifetime.
The "Badshah of Acting" enacts each scene with such ease and finesse that you are left astounded by the sheer brilliance of his genius since his body movements and dialogue delivery change in tune with the development of the character and story.

His performance in Gunga Jumna inspired future generations of actors, most notably Amitabh Bachchan, who was inspired by Dilip Kumar's performance in this film. According to Bachchan, he learnt more about acting from Gunga Jumna than he did from any other film. Bachchan, who hails from Uttar Pradesh, was particularly impressed by Kumar's mastery of the Awadhi dialect, expressing awe and surprise as to how "a man who’s not from Allahabad and Uttar Pradesh" could accurately express all the nuances of Awadhi. Bachchcan's famous "angry young man" persona was modeled after Kumar's performance as Gunga, with Bachchan's "angry young man" being a sharpened version of Kumar's intensity as Gunga. Bachchan adapted Kumar's style and reinterpreted it in a contemporary urban context reflecting the changing socio-political climate of 1970s India.
