= Sholay =

1975 Indian film by Ramesh Sippy

- Theatrical release poster
- Directed by: Ramesh Sippy
- Written by: Salim–Javed
- Produced by: G. P. Sippy
- Starring: Dharmendra; Sanjeev Kumar; Hema Malini; Amitabh Bachchan; Jaya Bhaduri; Amjad Khan
- Cinematography: Dwarka Divecha
- Edited by: M. S. Shinde
- Music by: R. D. Burman
- Production companies: United Producers; Sippy Films
- Distributed by: Sippy Films
- Release date: 15 August 1975
- Running time: 204 minutes (Original version); 198 minutes (Theatrical version)
- Country: India
- Language: Hindi
- Budget: ₹3.5 crore
- Box office: ₹35 crore 250 million tickets (worldwide)

Sholay (Hindustani: [ˈɕoːleː], transl. 'Embers') is a 1975 Indian Hindi-language action-adventure film directed by Ramesh Sippy, produced by his father G. P. Sippy, and written by Salim–Javed. The film follows two criminals, Veeru (Dharmendra) and Jai (Amitabh Bachchan), who are hired by a retired police officer (Sanjeev Kumar) to capture the ruthless bandit Gabbar Singh (Amjad Khan). Hema Malini and Jaya Bhaduri also star as Veeru and Jai's love interests, Basanti and Radha, respectively. The soundtrack was composed by R. D. Burman.

Filming took place in the rocky terrain of Ramanagara, in the southern state of Karnataka, over two and a half years, beginning in October 1973. After the Central Board of Film Certification mandated the removal of several violent scenes, Sholay was released theatrically as a 198-minute long film. The first version of the director's cut (running at 204 minutes) became available on home media in 1990. In 2025, the fully restored Director's Cut was released worldwide as Sholay: The Final Cut. Sholay is a Dacoit Western (sometimes called a "Curry Western"), combining the conventions of Indian dacoit films with those of Spaghetti Westerns along with elements of Samurai cinema.

Sholay was theatrically released on 15 August 1975. It received negative critical reviews and a tepid commercial response during its initial release. However, favourable word-of-mouth publicity helped it to become a box office success. It then went on to break records for continuous showings in many theatres across India, and ran for more than five years at Mumbai's Minerva theatre. The combined sales of the original soundtrack, scored by R. D. Burman, and the dialogues (released separately), set new records at the time. It was also an overseas success in the Soviet Union. Sholay was also at one point the highest-grossing Indian film ever at the time, and was the highest-grossing film in India up until Hum Aapke Hain Koun..! (1994).

Sholay is often regarded as one of the greatest and most influential Indian films of all time. It was ranked first in the British Film Institute's 2002 poll of "Top 10 Indian Films" of all time. In 2005, the judges of the 50th Filmfare Awards named it the Best Film of 50 Years. Sholay was also a defining example of the masala film, which mixes several genres in one work. Scholars have noted several themes in the film, such as glorification of violence, conformation to Indian feudalism, debate between social order and mobilised usurpers, homosocial bonding, and the film's role as a national allegory. The film's dialogue contributed to numerous cultural memes and becoming part of India's daily vernacular partly due to the release of a Polydor Records dialogue-only LP.

== Plot ==
=== Theatrical release (1975) ===
Best friends and small-time crooks Jai and Veeru escape from prison and are recruited by Thakur Baldev Singh, a former police inspector, to capture the notorious dacoit leader Gabbar Singh. Gabbar has been terrorising the rural village of Ramgarh and carries a ₹50,000 bounty. Thakur selects the duo because they had previously saved him from a train robbery, proving their valor and resourcefulness, however warns them that he wants Gabbar alive, not dead. Upon arriving in Ramgarh, Veeru falls for Basanti, a feisty, talkative horse-cart driver, while Jai develops develops feelings for Radha, Thakur's widowed, reclusive daughter-in-law.

The duo successfully thwarts Gabbar's henchmen when they arrive to extort supplies from the village. In a fit of rage over the failure, Gabbar executes the returning dacoits. During the festival of Holi, Gabbar's gang launches a massive ambush on the village. Though cornered, Jai and Veeru manage to repel the attackers. During the crossfire, a shotgun falls near Thakur's feet, but he does not pick it up or throw it to the duo despite it being within his reach. Frustrated by his apparent cowardice, Jai and Veeru threaten to abandon the assignment. Thakur then reveals his past: years prior, Gabbar slaughtered his entire family, and when Thakur went to Gabbar's hideout on his own to confront him, Gabbar caught him and severed both of his arms. He had hidden his dismemberment beneath a shawl constantly draped over his shoulders, leaving him physically incapable of firing a weapon.

Moved by Thakur's tragedy, Jai and Veeru vow to capture Gabbar alive without taking any payment. Seeking to break the villagers' resolve, Gabbar murders Ahmed, the son of the local Imam, Rahim Chacha. Instead of surrendering the mercenary duo, the grieving community encourages them to retaliate. Gabbar's men later ambush and capture Veeru and Basanti, forcing Basanti to dance on broken glass under threat of Veeru's execution. Jai infiltrates the hideout, rescues them, and the trio retreats to a rocky ridge under heavy gunfire. As their ammunition runs low, a wounded Jai deceives Veeru into taking Basanti to safety while he holds the perimeter. Jai sacrifices his life by using his final bullet to detonate a cache of dynamite, collapsing a bridge and killing the remaining dacoits.

Veeru returns to find Jai, but the severely wounded Jai dies in his arms, leaving both him and Radha devastated. Consumed by grief, an enraged Veeru decimates Gabbar's camp and corners the dacoit leader, nearly beating him to death. Thakur intervenes, reminding Veeru of his and Jai's promise to deliver Gabbar alive. Veeru, although fuelled by rage and grief agrees to hand him over solely to fulfill Jai's share of the promise. Wearing specialised spike-soled shoes, Thakur uses his feet to brutally pin and crush Gabbar's arms, in stark reflection to how Thakur himself had lost his arms. Just as Thakur prepares to deliver a fatal blow, a police contingent arrives, and the senior officer convinces Thakur to let the law handle the criminal. Following Jai's funeral and having completed his assignment, a sombre Veeru boards a train to leave Ramgarh, only to find Basanti waiting on board to join him.

=== Director's cut ===
The original director's cut features a darker, alternative resolution to the conflict. In this version, the police do not arrive to intercept the final confrontation. Instead, Thakur relentlessly beats Gabbar with his spiked boots, ultimately kicking him against the sharp, rusted iron nails of the very wooden pillars where Thakur had been chained and dismembered years earlier. The impact impales and kills Gabbar instantly.

This version also restores several sequences originally excised by the Indian Censor Board due to concerns regarding graphic violence and vigilante justice. These include detailed scenes of Thakur lacing his shoe soles with metallic spikes, extended camaraderie between Jai and Veeru during the train ambush, and the explicit on-screen murder of the Imam's son.

== Cast ==
- Dharmendra as Veeru
- Sanjeev Kumar as Thakur Baldev Singh, a retired Police Officer
- Hema Malini as Basanti, Veeru's love interest
- Amitabh Bachchan as Jaidev "Jai"
- Jaya Bhaduri as Radha, Thakur's daughter-in-law and Jai's love interest
- Amjad Khan as Gabbar Singh, a wanted dacoit.
- A. K. Hangal as Rahim Chacha, the imam in the village
- Satyen Kappu as Ram Lal, Thakur's servant
- Iftekhar as Inspector Khurana, Radha's Father
- Leela Mishra as Mausi, Basanti's maternal aunt
- Vikas Anand as Jailor
- Mac Mohan as Sambha, Gabbar Singh's sidekick
- Keshto Mukherjee as Hariram, prison barber and Jailor's side-kick
- Sachin Pilgaonkar as Ahmed, son of the imam
- Master Alankar as grandson of Thakur Baldev Singh; the character's name is not mentioned in the film.
- Viju Khote as Kaalia, one of the Gabbar's men whom he kills in a game of Russian roulette
- Major Anand as unnamed, one of the Gabbar's men whom he kills in a game of Russian roulette
- Bhagwan Sinha as unnamed, one of the Gabbar's men killed by him in a game of Russian roulette
- Arvind Joshi as elder son of Thakur Baldev Singh
- Bhanumati as Nirmala
- Birbal as the prisoner with half shaven mustache
- Raj Kishore as a jail inmate with feminine mannerisms
- Asrani as the Jailor, a comical character modelled after Charlie Chaplin in The Great Dictator
- Gita Siddharth as Geeta, Thakur Baldev Singh's daughter in law
- Helen in a special appearance in song "Mehbooba Mehbooba"
- Jairaj as Police Commissioner
- Jagdeep as Soorma Bhopali, a comical wood trader
- Jalal Agha in a special appearance in song "Mehbooba Mehbooba"
- Om Shivpuri as a police officer investigating Gabbar's attack in the village.
- Sharad Kumar as Ninni, younger son of Thakur Baldev Singh

== Production ==
=== Development ===
The screenwriter pair Salim–Javed, consisting of Salim Khan and Javed Akhtar, began narrating the idea for Sholay as a four-line snippet to filmmakers in 1973. The idea was rejected by two producer/director teams, including directors Manmohan Desai and Prakash Mehra. About six months after the release of Zanjeer (1973), (Note: Salim-Javed won their first Filmfare Awards for Zanjeer: Filmfare Award for Best Screenplay and Best Story in 1974.) Salim-Javed contacted G. P. Sippy and his son Ramesh Sippy, and narrated the four-line snippet to them. Ramesh Sippy liked the concept of Sholay and hired them to develop it. The original idea of the film involved an army officer who decided to hire two ex-soldiers to avenge the murder of his family. The army officer was later changed to a policeman because Sippy felt that it would be difficult to get permission to shoot scenes depicting army activities. Salim-Javed completed the script in one month, incorporating names and personality traits of their friends and acquaintances. The film's script and dialogues are in Hindustani; Salim-Javed wrote the dialogues in Urdu script, which was then transcribed by an assistant into Devanagari script so that Hindi readers could read the Urdu dialogues.

The film's plot was loosely styled after Akira Kurosawa's 1954 samurai cinema film, Seven Samurai. Sholay is a defining example of the Dacoit Western film, combining the conventions of Indian dacoit films, especially Mehboob Khan's Mother India (1957) and the Dilip Kumar and Nitin Bose film Gunga Jumna (1961), with that of Westerns, especially Sergio Leone's Spaghetti Westerns such as Once Upon a Time in the West (1968) as well as The Magnificent Seven (1960). It also has some plot elements borrowed from the Indian films Mera Gaon Mera Desh (1971) and Khote Sikkay (1974). A scene depicting an attempted train robbery was inspired by a similar scene in Gunga Jumna, and has also been compared to a similar scene in North West Frontier (1959). A scene showing the massacre of Thakur's family has been compared with the massacre of the McBain family in Once Upon a Time in the West. Sholay may have also been influenced by Sam Peckinpah's Westerns, such as The Wild Bunch (1969) and Pat Garrett and Billy the Kid (1973), and George Roy Hill's Butch Cassidy and the Sundance Kid (1969).

The character Gabbar Singh was modelled on a real-life dacoit Gabbar Singh Gujjar who had menaced the villages around Gwalior in the 1950s. Any policeman captured by Gujjar had his ears and nose cut off, and was released as a warning to other policemen. The fictional Gabbar was also influenced by larger-than-life characters in Pakistani author Ibn-e-Safi's Urdu novels, Dilip Kumar's dacoit character Gunga from the film Gunga Jumna who speaks with a similar mixed Khariboli and Awadhi dialect, and villains from Sergio Leone's films. Sippy wanted to do away with the clichéd idea of a man becoming a dacoit due to societal issues, as was the case in other films, and focused on Gabbar being an emblem of pure evil. To emphasise the point of Gabbar being a new type of villain, Sippy avoided the typical tropes of dacoits wearing dhotis and pagris and sporting a tika and worshipping "Ma Bhavani"; Gabbar would be wearing army fatigues. The look of the character of the jailer, played by Asrani was influenced by Adolf Hitler. Javed Akhtar brought a book on World War II which had several pictures of Hitler posing to set the typical posture of the character in the film. Asrani spiced up his character with some ideas about Hitler's speech delivery he had heard from a teacher in FTII. The trademark 'Ha Ha' at the end of his monologues was inspired by a similar performance by Jack Lemmon in The Great Race. Soorma Bhopali, a minor comic relief character, was based on an acquaintance of actor Jagdeep, a forest officer from Bhopal named Soorma. The real-life Soorma eventually threatened to press charges when people who had viewed the film began referring to him as a woodcutter. The main characters' names, Jai and Veeru, mean "victory" and "heroism" in Hindi.

=== Casting ===
The producers considered Danny Denzongpa for the role of Gabbar Singh, but he could not accept it as he was committed to act in Feroz Khan's Dharmatma (1975), under production at the same time. Amjad Khan, who was the second choice, prepared himself for the part by reading the book Abhishapta Chambal, which told of the exploits of Chambal dacoits. The book was written by Taroon Kumar Bhaduri, the father of fellow cast member Jaya Bhaduri. Sanjeev Kumar also wanted to play the role of Gabbar Singh, but Salim-Javed "felt he had the audience's sympathy through roles he'd done before; Gabbar had to be completely hateful."

Sippy wanted Shatrughan Sinha to play the part of Jai, but there were already several big stars signed, and Amitabh Bachchan, who was not very popular yet, lobbied hard to get the part for himself. He was cast after Salim-Javed recommended him for Sholay in 1973; Bachchan's performance in their first collaboration, Zanjeer, convinced Salim-Javed he was the right actor for the part. Salim-Javed were also impressed with Bachchan's performance in Raaste Kaa Patthar (1972), and at Bachchan's request, Dharmendra had personally put in a word for him. All these factors ensured that the role was Bachchan's.

As cast members had read the script ahead of time, many were interested in playing different parts. Pran was considered for the role of Thakur Baldev Singh, but Sippy thought Sanjeev Kumar was a better choice. Initially, Salim-Javed approached Dilip Kumar to play Thakur's role, but he turned down the offer; Dilip Kumar later said it was one of the few films he regretted turning down. Initially, Dharmendra was also interested to play the role of Thakur. He eventually gave up the role when Sippy informed him that Sanjeev Kumar would play Veeru if that happened, and would thus be paired with Hema Malini, who Dharmendra was trying to woo. Dharmendra knew that Kumar was also interested in Malini. Malini was reluctant to play the role of a tangewali, more so after Sippy told her that the film belongs to Sanjeev Kumar and Amjad Khan, but she trusted Sippy to give her a meaty role, given that he had played a huge role in essaying her stardom through their previous collaborations.

During the film's production, four of the leads became romantically involved. Bachchan married Bhaduri four months before filming started. This led to shooting delays when Bhaduri became pregnant with their daughter Shweta. By the time the film released, she was pregnant with their son Abhishek. Dharmendra had begun courting Malini during their earlier film Seeta Aur Geeta (1972), also directed by Sippy, and used the location shoot of Sholay to further pursue her. During their romantic scenes, Dharmendra would often pay the light boys to spoil the shot, thereby ensuring many retakes which would allow him to spend more time with her. The couple married five years after the film's release.

=== Filming ===
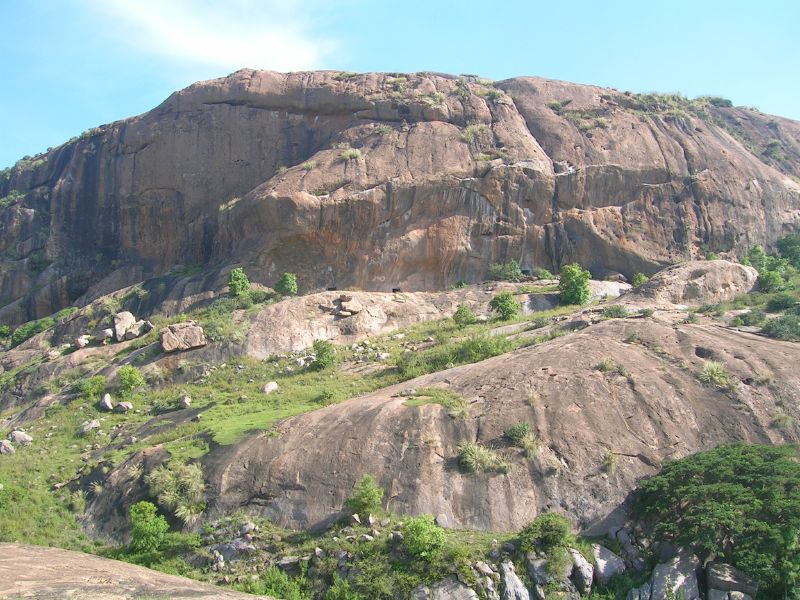
Ramdevarabetta, near the town of Ramanagara; much of Sholay was shot in rocky locations such as this.

Much of Sholay was shot in the rocky terrain of Ramanagara, a town near Bangalore, Karnataka. The filmmakers had to build a road from the Bangalore highway to Ramanagara for convenient access to the sets. Art director Ram Yedekar had an entire township built on the site. A prison set was constructed near Rajkamal Studios in Bombay, also outdoors, to match the natural lighting of the on-location sets. One part of Ramanagara was for a time called "Sippy Nagar" as a tribute to the director of the film. As of 2010, a visit to the "Sholay rocks" (where much of the film was shot) was still being offered to tourists travelling through Ramanagara.

Filming began on location on 3 October 1973, with a scene featuring Bachchan and Bhaduri. The film had a lavish production for its time (with frequent banquets and parties for the cast), took two and a half years to make, and went over budget. One reason for its high cost was that Sippy re-filmed scenes many times to get his desired effect. "Yeh Dosti", a 5-minute song sequence, took 21 days to shoot, two short scenes in which Radha lights lamps took 20 days to film because of lighting problems, and the shooting of the scene in which Gabbar kills the imam's son lasted 19 days. The train robbery sequence, shot on the Bombay–Poona railway route near Panvel, took more than 7 weeks to complete.

Sholay was the first Indian film to have a stereophonic soundtrack and to use the 70 mm widescreen format. However, since actual 70 mm cameras were expensive at the time, the film was shot on traditional 35 mm film and the 4:3 picture was subsequently converted to a 2.2:1 frame. Regarding the process, Sippy said, "A 70 mm [sic] format takes the awe of the big screen and magnifies it even more to make the picture even bigger, but since I also wanted a spread of sound we used six-track stereophonic sound and combined it with the big screen. It was definitely a differentiator." The use of 70 mm was emphasised by film posters on which the name of the film was stylised to match the CinemaScope logo. Film posters also sought to differentiate the film from those which had come before; one of them added the tagline: "The greatest star cast ever assembled – the greatest story ever told".

== Themes and interpretations ==
Scholars have noted several themes in the film, such as glorification of violence, conformation to feudal ethos, debate between social order and mobilised usurpers, homosocial bonding, and the film's role as a national allegory.

Koushik Banerjea, a sociologist in the London School of Economics, notes that Sholay exhibits a "sympathetic construction of 'rogue' masculinity" exemplified by the likeable outlaws Jai and Veeru. Banerjea argues during the film, the moral boundary between legality and criminality gradually erodes. Film scholar Wimal Dissanayake agrees that the film brought "a new stage in the evolving dialectic between violence and social order" to Indian cinema. Film scholar M. Madhava Prasad states that Jai and Veeru represent a marginalised population that is introduced into conventional society. Prasad says that, through the elements of revenge included in the plot and the application of Jai and Veeru's criminality for the greater good, the narrative reflects reactionary politics, and the audience is compelled to accept feudal order. Banerjea explains that though Jai and Veeru are mercenaries, they are humanised by their emotional needs. Such dualism makes them vulnerable, in contrast to the pure evil of Gabbar Singh.

Gabbar Singh, the film's antagonist, was well received by the audience, despite his pervasive sadistic cruelty. Dissanayake explains that the audience was fascinated by the dialogues and mannerisms of the character, and this element of spectacle outweighed his actions, a first for Indian melodrama. He notes that the picturisation of violence in the film was glamourised and uninhibited. He further notes that, unlike earlier melodramas in which the female body occupies the audience's attention as an object of male fetish, in Sholay, the male body becomes the centrepiece. It becomes the battleground where good and evil compete for supremacy. Dissanayake argues that Sholay can be viewed as a national allegory: it lacks a comforting logical narrative, it shows social stability being repeatedly challenged, and it shows the devaluation of human life resulting from a lack of emotions. Taken together, these elements comprise the allegorical representation of India. The narrative style of Sholay, with its violence, revenge, and vigilante action, is occasionally compared by scholars to the political unrest in India at the time of its release. This tension culminated in the Emergency (rule by decree) declared by prime minister Indira Gandhi in 1975.

Dissanayeke and Sahai note that, although the film was influenced by the Hollywood Western genre, particularly in its visuals, it was successfully "Indianised". As an example, William van der Heide has compared a massacre scene in Sholay with a similar scene in Once Upon a Time in the West. Although both films were similar in technical style, Sholay emphasised Indian family values and melodramatic tradition, while the Western was more materialistic and restrained in its approach. Maithili Rao, in Encyclopedia of Hindi Cinema, notes that Sholay infuses the style of the Western genre into a "feudalistic ethos". Ted Shen of the Chicago Reader notes Sholay's "hysterical visual style" and intermittent "populist message". Cultural critic and Islamic scholar Ziauddin Sardar lampoons the film in his book The Secret Politics of Our Desires: Innocence, Culpability and Indian Popular Cinema, both for its caricature and stereotyping of Muslim and women characters, and for what he calls mockery of innocent villagers. Sardar notes that the two most prominent Muslim characters in the film are Soorma Bhopali (a buffoonish criminal), and an impotent victim of the bandits (the imam). Meanwhile, the sole function of one female character (Radha) is to suffer her fate in silence, while the other female lead (Basanti) is just a garrulous village belle.

Some scholars have indicated that Sholay contains homosocial themes. Ted Shen describes the male bonding shown in the film as bordering on camp style. Dina Holtzman, in her book Bollywood and Globalisation: Indian Popular Cinema, Nation, and Diaspora, states that the death of Jai, and resultant break of bonding between the two male leads, is necessary for the sake of establishing a normative heterosexual relationship (that of Veeru and Basanti).

== Music and dialogue ==
Sholay

Soundtrack album by R. D. Burman
- Released: 1975
- Recorded: 1975
- Genres: Bollywood music; Feature film soundtrack
- Length: 28:59
- Labels: Universal Music India; Polydor Records
- Producer: R. D. Burman

R. D. Burman chronology
| Kala Sona (1975) | Sholay (1975) | Dharam Karam (1975) |

R. D. Burman composed the film's music, and the lyrics were written by Anand Bakshi. The songs used in the film, and released on the original soundtrack are listed below.

Kishore Kumar, Lata Mangeshkar and Manna Dey performed vocals for Dharmendra, Malini and Bachchan, respectively.

The song "Mehbooba Mehbooba" was sung by its composer, R. D. Burman, who received his sole Filmfare Award nomination for playback singing for his effort. The song, which is often featured on Bollywood hit song compilations, is based on "Say You Love Me" by Greek singer Demis Roussos.

"Mehbooba Mehbooba" has been extensively anthologised, remixed, and recreated. A version was created in 2005 by the Kronos Quartet for their Grammy-nominated album You've Stolen My Heart, featuring Asha Bhosle. It was also remixed and sung by Himesh Reshammiya, along with Bhosle, in his debut acting film Aap Kaa Surroor (2007). "Yeh Dosti" has been called the ultimate friendship anthem. It was remixed and sung by Shankar Mahadevan and Udit Narayan for the 2010 Malayalam film Four Friends, and also in 2010 it was used to symbolise India's friendship with the United States during a visit from President Barack Obama.

Several songs from the soundtrack made it to the annual Binaca Geetmala list of top filmi songs. "Mehbooba Mehooba" was listed at No. 24 on the 1975 list, and at No. 6 on the 1976 list. "Koi Haseena" was listed at No. 30 in 1975, and No. 20 in 1976. "Yeh Dosti" was listed at No. 9 in 1976. Despite the soundtrack's success, at the time, the songs from Sholay attracted less attention than the film's dialogue—a rarity for Hindi language films. The producers were thus prompted to release records with only dialogue. Taken together, the album sales reached an unprecedented 500,000 units. By 1979, the soundtrack went Platinum (equivalent to 1 million sales at the time), becoming one of the top-selling Bollywood soundtracks of the 1970s.

Music critic Oli Marlow reviewed the soundtrack in 2013, calling it a unique fusion of religious, folk, and classical music, with influences from around the world. He also commented on the sound design of the film, calling it psychedelic, and saying that there was "a lot of incredible incidental music" in the film that was not included in the soundtrack releases. In a 1999 paper submitted to London's Symposium on Sound in Cinema, film critic Shoma A. Chatterji said, "Sholay offers a model lesson on how sound can be used to signify the terror a character evokes. Sholay is also exemplary in its use of soundmatching to jump cut to a different scene and time, without breaking the continuity of the narrative, yet, intensifying the drama."

Original Motion Picture Soundtrack
| No. | Title | Singer(s) | Length |
|---|---|---|---|
| 1. | "Title Music (Sholay)" (Instrumental) | | 02:46 |
| 2. | "Yeh Dosti" | Kishore Kumar and Manna Dey | 05:21 |
| 3. | "Haa Jab Tak Hai Jaan" | Lata Mangeshkar | 05:26 |
| 4. | "Koi Haseena" | Kishore Kumar and Hema Malini | 04:00 |
| 5. | "Holi Ke Din" | Kishore Kumar and Lata Mangeshkar | 05:42 |
| 6. | "Mehbooba Mehbooba" | R. D. Burman | 03:54 |
| 7. | "Yeh Dosti" (sad version) | Kishore Kumar | 01:49 |

Bonus tracks – Released later
| No. | Title | Singers / Speakers | Length |
|---|---|---|---|
| 8. | "Ke Chand Sa Koi Chehra" (Qawwali) | Kishore Kumar, Manna Dey, Bhupinder Singh, Anand Bakshi | – |
| 9. | "Veeru Ki Sagai" (dialogues) | Hema Malini, Dharmendra, Amitabh Bachchan | – |
| 10. | "Gabbar Singh" (dialogues) | Amjad Khan, Sanjeev Kumar, Dharmendra | – |

=== Polydor Dialogue LP ===
About three weeks after the film's release, audiences were starting to repeat key dialogue from the film. Thus about a month after the initial release Polydor Records released a record devoted entirely to dialogue from the film that became very popular.

== Release ==
=== Box office ===
Sholay was released on 15 August 1975, Indian Independence Day, in Bombay. Due to lackluster reviews and a lack of effective visual marketing tools, it saw poor financial returns in its first two weeks. From the third week, however, viewership picked up owing to positive word of mouth. During the initial slow period, the director and writer considered re-shooting some scenes so that Amitabh Bachchan's character would not die. When business picked up, they abandoned this idea. After being helped additionally by a soundtrack release containing dialogue snippets, Sholay soon became an "overnight sensation". The film was then released in other distribution zones such as Delhi, Uttar Pradesh, Bengal, and Hyderabad on 11 October 1975. It became the highest-grossing Hindi language film of 1975, and film ranking website Box Office India has given the film a verdict of All Time Blockbuster.

Sholay went on to earn a still-standing record of 60 golden jubilees (Note: A golden jubilee means that a film has completed 50 consecutive weeks of showing in a single theatre.) across India, and was the first film in India to celebrate a silver jubilee (Note: A silver jubilee means that a film has completed 25 consecutive weeks of showing in a single theatre.) at over 100 theatres. It was shown continuously at Bombay's Minerva theatre for over five years. Sholay was the Indian film with the longest theatrical run until Dilwale Dulhania Le Jayenge (1995) broke its record of 286 weeks in 2001.

According to Box Office India, Sholay earned about ₹150 million in net income (Note: According to the website Box Office India, film tickets are subject to "entertainment tax" in India, and this tax is added to the ticket price at the box office window of theatres. The amount of this tax is variable among states. "Nett gross figures are always after this tax has been deducted while gross figures are before this tax has been deducted." Although since 2003, the entertainment tax rate has significantly decreased; as of 2010, gross earnings can be 30–35% higher than net gross, depending on the states where the film is released.) (valued at about US$16,778,000 in 1975) (Note: The exchange rate in 1975 was 8.94 Indian rupees (₹) per 1 US dollar (US$).) in India during its first run, which was many times its ₹35 million budget. Those earnings in India were a record that remained unbroken for nineteen years, which is also the longest amount of time that a film has held the record for being the highest grossing film in India. Its original gross was increased further with re-releases during the late 1970s, 1980s, 1990s, and early 2000s. The film's total gross revenue in India amounted to ₹350 million ($39.15 million). Box Office India estimates the film's total footfalls in India as over 100 million tickets sold. The film was also an overseas success in the Soviet Union, where it was released in 1979. The film sold 48.4 million tickets during its initial run at the Soviet box office, before eventually selling 60 million tickets including re-runs. The film was also released in China, as two parts in 1988.

It was the highest-grossing Indian film ever up until Disco Dancer (1982), and the highest-grossing film in India up until Hum Aapke Hain Koun..! (1994). In 1985, India Today estimated that the film drew a total audience of 250 million over the years, which is comparable to the number of tickets sold by some of the world's highest-grossing films of all time adjusted for inflation. It is often cited that, after adjusting the figures for inflation, Sholay remains one of the highest-grossing films in the history of Indian cinema, although such figures are not known with certainty. Box Office India estimated ₹1.63 billion as Sholay's adjusted domestic net income in 2008, while The Times of India estimated over ₹3 billion as the adjusted domestic gross in 2009. Mid-Day estimated the film's total adjusted gross as ₹15 billion ($246 million) in 2014.

=== 3D re-release (2013) ===
Filmmaker Ketan Mehta's company Maya Digital was responsible for converting Sholay into the 3D format. Mehta was approached by G. P. Sippy's grandson, Sasha Sippy, about the project in 2010. In March 2012, Shaan Uttam Singh, the grandson of producer G. P. Sippy, said that he would sponsor a conversion of the film to 3D, and release it in late 2012; this was later postponed to late 2013, and eventually finalised for 3 January 2014. It took ₹250 million (US$2.7 million) to convert Sholay to 3D.

Under the leadership of computer animator Frank Foster, 350 people worked to convert the film into the digital 3D format, for which every scene had to be individually restored, colour-corrected, and re-composited in 3D to match the depth. (Note: The 3D version of the film has a run-time of 198 minutes, and the original shots were of standard film frame rate, i.e., 24 frames per second; therefore, this version has 285,120 frames, which were digitised, upscaled to High Definition (HD), and element-mapped.) New set-pieces, particularly those suited to the new format were also included, such as digital logs which scatter in the direction of the camera during the first half when the train collides with them, the gunshot scene which frees Jai and Veeru from their handcuffs, and panoramic views of Gabbar's hideout in the caves.

The theatrical trailer and release date were unveiled by the original script-writers Salim Khan and Javed Akhtar. The two original leads, Bachchan and Dharmendra, were also involved in promoting the re-release.

The film was released in 1,000 screens in India and additional screens overseas. It earned approximately ₹13 crore (US$1.4 million) during its re-release, becoming the third highest-grossing re-released Indian film of all time.

=== Sholay: The Final Cut (2025) ===
In 2022, Sippy Films collaborated with the Film Heritage Foundation and L’Immagine Ritrovata for a full restoration in correlation with the film's fiftieth anniversary. Due to significant damage to the original camera negative resulting from severe vinegar syndrome, the restoration utilised an interpositive and two colour reversal intermediates located at Iron Mountain and the BFI in the UK, a second interpositive from 1978 deposited by Shehzad Sippy to FHF, and the original sound negative and magnetic elements housed in Sippy Films' Mumbai offices. The film was also restored in 4K to its original 70mm aspect ratio of 2.2:1 with assistance from Kamlakar Rao and incorporates the original uncut ending, along with two previously excised scenes that were removed by censors in 1975.

The fully restored, uncut version (including Sippy's original ending) was released worldwide as Sholay: The Final Cut. It premiered at Il Cinema Ritrovato on 27 June 2025, and released globally on 12 December 2025. The runtime is classified in 209 minutes.

== Reception ==
=== Critical response ===
August 1975

When the film released on 15 August 1975, it received poor reviews. Among contemporary critics, K.L. Amladi of India Today called the film a "dead ember" and "a gravely flawed attempt". Filmfare said that the film was an unsuccessful mincing of Western style with Indian milieu, making it an "imitation western—neither here nor there." Others labelled it as "sound and fury signifying nothing" and a "second-rate take-off" of the 1971 film Mera Gaon Mera Desh. Trade journals and columnists initially called the film a flop.

Later August/September 1975-present

However, over time the response shifted and it became a cultural icon. It is now considered a classic, and among the greatest Hindi-language films. In a 1976 article in the journal Studies: An Irish Quarterly Review, author Michael Gallagher praised the technical achievement of the film, but otherwise criticised it stating, "As a spectacle it breaks new ground, but on every other level it is intolerable: formless, incoherent, superficial in human image, and a somewhat nasty piece of violence".

In a 2005 BBC review, the well-rounded characters and simple narrative of the film were commended, but the comical cameos of Asrani and Jagdeep were considered unnecessary. On the film's 35th anniversary, the Hindustan Times wrote that it was a "trailblazer in terms of camera work as well as music," and that "practically every scene, dialogue or even a small character was a highlight." In 2006, The Film Society of Lincoln Center described Sholay as "an extraordinary and utterly seamless blend of adventure, comedy, music and dance", labelling it an "indisputable classic". Chicago Review critic Ted Shen criticised the film in 2002 for its formulaic plot and "slapdash" cinematography, and noted that the film "alternates between slapstick and melodrama". In their obituary of the producer G.P. Sippy, The New York Times said that Sholay "revolutionized Hindi filmmaking and brought true professionalism to Indian script writing".

On the review aggregator website Rotten Tomatoes, the film has an approval rating of 95% based on 22 reviews, with an average rating of 8.10/10.

=== Accolades ===
Sholay was nominated for nine Filmfare Awards, and the only winner was M. S. Shinde, who won the award for Best Editing. The film also won three awards at the 1976 Bengal Film Journalists' Association Awards (Hindi section): "Best Actor in Supporting Role" for Amjad Khan, "Best Cinematographer (Colour)" for Dwarka Divecha, and "Best Art Director" for Ram Yedekar. Sholay received a special award at the 50th Filmfare Awards in 2005: Best Film of 50 Years.

| Awards | Category | Nominee | Result |
|---|---|---|---|
| Bengal Film Journalists' Association Awards | Best Supporting Actor | Amjad Khan | Won |
| Bengal Film Journalists' Association Awards | Best Cinematography | Dwarka Divecha | Won |
| Bengal Film Journalists' Association Awards | Best Art Direction | Ram Yadekar | Won |
| 23rd Filmfare Awards | Best Editing | M. S. Shinde | Won |
| 23rd Filmfare Awards | Best Film | G. P. Sippy | Nominated |
| 23rd Filmfare Awards | Best Director | Ramesh Sippy | Nominated |
| 23rd Filmfare Awards | Best Actor | Sanjeev Kumar | Nominated |
| 23rd Filmfare Awards | Best Supporting Actor | Amjad Khan | Nominated |
| 23rd Filmfare Awards | Best Comedian | Asrani | Nominated |
| 23rd Filmfare Awards | Best Story | Salim-Javed | Nominated |
| 23rd Filmfare Awards | Best Music Director | R. D. Burman | Nominated |
| 23rd Filmfare Awards | Best Lyricist | Anand Bakshi for "Mehbooba Mehbooba" | Nominated |
| 23rd Filmfare Awards | Best Male Playback Singer | R. D. Burman | Nominated |
| 50th Filmfare Awards | Special Award | Best Film for Completing 50 Years | Received |

== Legacy and cultural influence ==
As discussed in the 2024 documentary, Angry Young Men, Sholay is considered the third of three films between 1973-1975 (including Zanjeer and Deewaar) that established Bachchan's "Angry Young Man" persona during the 1970s and 80s. It is often credited with making Bachchan a "superstar", two years after he became a star with Zanjeer.

It inspired many films and pastiches, and spawned a genre of films, the "Curry Western", which is a play on the term Spaghetti Western. A more accurate label for the genre is the Dacoit Western, due to its roots in earlier Indian dacoit films such as Mother India (1957) and Gunga Jumna (1961). It was also an early and most definitive masala film, and a trend-setter for "multi-star" films. The BBC has described Sholay as the "Star Wars of Bollywood", comparing its impact on Hindi language films to the impact that Star Wars (1977) later had on Hollywood, while comparing Gabbar Singh to Darth Vader. It was also a watershed for scriptwriters in Hindi language films, who were not paid well before Sholay; after the film's success, its writing duo Salim-Javed became stars in their own right and script writing became a more respected profession.

It has received a number of "Best Film" honours. It was declared the "Film of the Millennium" by BBC India in 1999. It topped the British Film Institute's "Top 10 Indian Films" of all time poll of 2002, and was voted the greatest Indian movie in a Sky Digital poll of one million British Indians in 2004. It was also included in the magazine Time's "Best of Bollywood" list in 2010, and in IBN Live's list of the "100 greatest Indian films of all time" in 2013. In 2023, Time Out ranked it #1 on its list of the "100 Best Bollywood Movies."

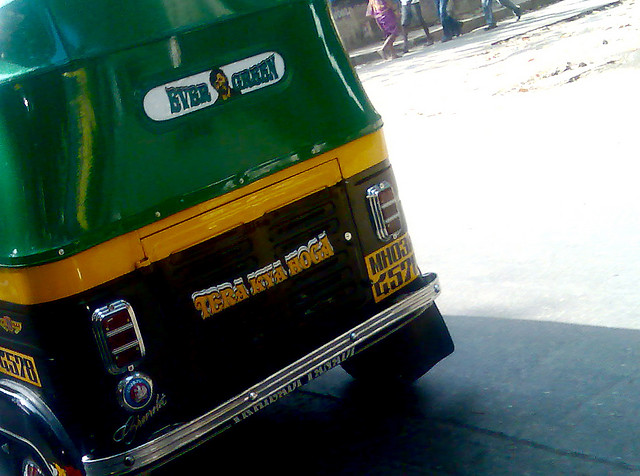
A line of Gabbar Singh (Tera kya hoga, meaning, "What will happen to you?") and a picture of him is painted on the back of an auto rickshaw, a common mode of public transport. Dialogues and characters from the film have contributed to many cultural tropes in India's daily life.

Certain scenes and dialogues earned iconic status in India, such as "Kitne aadmi the" (How many men were there?), "Jo dar gaya, samjho mar gaya" (One who is scared is dead), and "Bahut yaarana laagta hai" (Looks like you two are very close) – all dialogues of Gabbar Singh. These and other popular dialogues entered the people's daily vernacular. Characters and dialogues from the film continue to be referred to and parodied in popular culture. Gabbar Singh, the sadistic villain, ushered in an era in Hindi films characterised by "seemingly omnipotent oppressors as villains", who play the pivotal role in setting up the context of the story, such as Shakal (played by Kulbhushan Kharbanda) of Shaan (1980), Mogambo (Amrish Puri) of Mr. India (1987) and Bhujang (Amrish Puri) of Tridev (1989). Filmfare, in 2013, named Gabbar Singh the most iconic villain in the history of Indian cinema, and four actors were included in its 2010 list of "80 Iconic Performances" for their work in this film.

Some of the supporting actors remained etched in public memory as the characters they played in Sholay; for example, Mac Mohan continued to be referred to as "Sambha", even though his character had just one line. Major and minor characters continue to be used in commercials, promos, films and sitcoms. Amjad Khan acted in many villainous roles later in his career. He also played Gabbar Singh again in the 1991 spoof Ramgarh Ke Sholay, and reprised the role in commercials. The British Film Institute in 2002 wrote that fear of Gabbar Singh "is still invoked by mothers to put their children to sleep". The 2012 film Gabbar Singh, named after the character, became the highest-grossing Telugu film up to that point. Comedian Jagdeep, who played Soorma Bhopali in the film, attempted to use his Sholay success to create a spinoff. He directed and played the lead role in the 1988 film Soorma Bhopali, in which Dharmendra and Bachchan had cameos.

Sholay was remade in Bangladesh as Dost Dushman (1977), was criticised by many critics in the country. In 2004, Sholay was digitally remastered and shown again to packed theatres in India, including Mumbai's Minerva, where it had run successfully 29 years earlier. Another attempt to remake Sholay, Ram Gopal Varma's film Aag (2007), starring Amitabh Bachchan as the villain, was a commercial and critical disaster.

Because of television and home media, Sholay is widely available and still popular. Twenty years after its release, Sholay was first shown on the Indian DD National television channel, where it drew the highest ratings ever for an Indian film broadcast. Video game producer Mobile2win released the Sholay Ramgarh Express game for mobile phones in 2004, along with other Sholay themed content such as wallpapers, video clips, and ringtones; another video game Sholay: Bullets of Justice developed by Gameshastra has also been released. Sholay Adventures, a 2014 Indian animated television film adaptation of Sholay aired on Pogo TV. In 2019, a film titled The Sholay Girl, based on the stunt woman Reshma Pathan, was released. Pathan had worked as the body double for Malini in the film.

Sholay has been the subject of two books and many articles. Wimal Dissanayake and Malti Sahai's Sholay, A Cultural Reading (1992) attempts a comprehensive scholarly study that sets the film within the broader history of popular cinema in India. Anupama Chopra's Sholay: The Making of a Classic (2000) provides an inside look at the film's production based on interviews with the director, stars, and crew members.

Chopra deems Sholay the gold standard in Indian cinema, and a reference point for audiences and trade analysts. Over the years, the film has reached a mythic stature in popular culture, and has been called the greatest Hindi film of all time. It belongs to only a small collection of films, including Kismet (1943), Mother India (1957), Mughal-e-Azam (1960), Hum Aapke Hain Koun..! (1994) and Gadar: Ek Prem Katha (2001), which are repeatedly watched throughout India, and are viewed as definitive Hindi films with cultural significance. The lasting effect of Sholay on Indian cinema was summarised by Anupama Chopra, when in 2004 she called it "no longer just a film, [but] an event". In the 2000 book Sholay: The Making of a Classic, the noted director Shekhar Kapur stated "there has never been a more defining film on the Indian screen. Indian film history can be divided into Sholay BC and Sholay AD". The film was jointly released in Pakistan by Geo films and Mandviwalla Entertainment on 17 April 2015, almost 40 years after its theatrical release. The film's premiere in the country was held in Karachi.

Screenwriter V. Vijayendra Prasad, responsible for a number of blockbusters in the early 21st century, including the South Indian franchise Baahubali and the Hindi film Bajrangi Bhaijaan (starring Salim's son Salman Khan), cited Sholay as a major inspiration on his work.

== See also ==
- Angry young man (India)
- Angry Young Men (miniseries)
- List of cult films
- List of highest-grossing Indian films
- Gabbar Singh (disambiguation)
