= Lava (1980 film) =

1980 film

- Newspaper advertisement
- Directed by: Hariharan
- Written by: S. L. Puram Sadanandan (dialogues)
- Screenplay by: Hariharan
- Produced by: G. P. Balan
- Starring: Prem Nazir; Maadhavi; Jagathy Sreekumar; Prameela; Sathar
- Cinematography: Melli Irani
- Edited by: V. P. Krishnan
- Music by: G. Devarajan
- Production company: GP Films
- Distributed by: GP Films
- Release date: 23 August 1980
- Country: India
- Language: Malayalam

Lava is a 1980 Indian Malayalam-language film directed by Hariharan and produced by G. P. Balan. The film stars Prem Nazir, Jagathy Sreekumar, Prameela and Sathar. The film has musical score by G. Devarajan. It is a remake of the Hindi film Gunga Jumna (1961).

== Cast ==
- Prem Nazir as Ramu
- Maadhavi (actress)
- Jagathy Sreekumar as Kuttappan
- Prameela as Janaki
- Sathaar as Gopi
- Bahadoor as Govindan
- Balan K. Nair as Velayudhan
- G. K. Pillai as Police Officer
- Jayamalini as Dancer
- K. P. Ummer as Rajasekharan
- Krishna Kurup
- Kunjandi as Kumaran
- Madhavi as Seetha
- Nellikode Bhaskaran as Gopalan
- Oduvil Unnikrishnan as Panikkar
- Sumithra as Sindhu
- P. R. Varalakshmi as Rajasekharan's wife
- Santo Krishnan

== Soundtrack ==
The music was composed by G. Devarajan and the lyrics were written by Yusufali Kechery.

No.	Song	Singers	Lyrics	Length (m:ss)
1	"Aashaalathayile"	P. Jayachandran, Chorus	Yusufali Kechery	
2	"Chirakulla Mohangale"	P. Madhuri	Yusufali Kechery	
3	"Ee Thaarunya"	K. J. Yesudas, P. Jayachandran	Yusufali Kechery	
4	"Maarante Kovilil"	K. J. Yesudas	Yusufali Kechery	
5	"Vijayappoomaala"	P. Madhuri, Chorus, C. N. Unnikrishnan	Yusufali Kechery	
