= Insaaf Ki Dagar Pe =

Single by Hemant Kumar

from the album Gunga Jumna
- Released: 1961
- Recorded: 1961
- Genre: Film soundtrack, Patriotic song
- Songwriter: Shakeel Badayuni
- Composer: Naushad

Music video
- "Insaaf Ki Dagar Pe" on YouTube

Insaaf Ki Dagar Pe (On the path of justice) is an Indian song written by Shakeel Badayuni. It is a patriotic song represents the newfound optimism of Independent India. it addresses children and tells them their responsibility as Indian citizens. This a film soundtrack of Bollywood film Gunga Jumna (1961). This song was sung by Hemant Kumar.

The song was termed as evergreen and its attraction has never subsided.

== Lyrics ==
The lyrics of the song was in Hindi and was published in several books.

Insaaf Ki Dagar Pe

Baccho Dikhao Chal Ke

Ye Desh Hai Tumhara

Neta Tumhi Ho Kal Ke

Duniya Ke Ranj Sahna

Aur Kuch Na Muh Se Kahna

Sacchaiyo Ke Bal Pe

Aage Ko Badhte Rahna

Rakh Doge Ek Din Tum

Sansaar Ko Badal Ke

Insaaf Ki Dagar Pe

Baccho Dikhao Chal Ke

Ye Desh Hai Tumhara

Neta Tumhi Ho Kal Ke

Apne Ho Ya Paraye

Sabke Liye Ho Nyaay

Dekho Kadam Tumhara

Hargiz Na Dagmagaye

Raste Bade Kathin Hai

Chalna Sambhal Sambhal Ke

Insaaf Ki Dagar Pe

Baccho Dikhao Chal Ke

Ye Desh Hai Tumhara

Neta Tumhi Ho Kal Ke

Insaniyat Ke Sar Pe

Izzat Ka Taaj Rakhna

Tan Man Ki Bhent Dekar

Bharat Ki Laaj Rakhna

Jeevan Naya Milega

Antim Chita Me Jal Ke

Insaaf Ki Dagar Pe

Baccho Dikhao Chal Ke

Ye Desh Hai Tumhara

Neta Tumhi Ho Kal Ke

Lyrics-
