= Gabar =

Gabar may refer to: gabar

== Places ==
- Fitzroy Island (Queensland)
- Gabar, Iran
- Gabar, Burgas Province
- Gabar, Kriva Palanka, North Macedonia
- Mount Gabar, (Şırnak Province, Turkey)

== People ==
- Gabar Singh Negi (1895–1915), Indian Victoria Cross recipient

== Other ==
- Gabar goshawk, an African and Arabian bird of prey of the family Accipitridae

== See also ==
- Gabbar Singh (disambiguation)
