= Gabbar Singh Gujjar =

Indian dacoit

Gabbar Singh (born Gabar Singh; 1926 – 13 November 1959) was a dacoit (bandit) active in the late 1950s in the Chambal valley of north-central India.

== Early life ==
Gabbar Singh was born as Gabar Singh in 1926 in Dang village of Gohad Tehsil, Bhind district in Central Provinces and Berar, British India. It is situated in the Chambal division. His father's name was Raghuveer Singh.

== Dacoity career ==
In 1955, Gabbar Singh left his house and village to join the famous Kalyan Singh gang of Bhind. Later, Gabbar formed his own gang between October and December 1956, he committed a series of murders and dacoities in the Indian state of Madhya Pradesh and Uttar Pradesh. In December 1957, he went on to disfigure several persons in Machhuari, Bhakre, Chammodi and Chirenasta villages in Madhya Pradesh.

=== Reward for capture ===
The state governments of Madhya Pradesh, Rajasthan and Uttar Pradesh declared a ransom reward of ₹50,000 for his head in 1959. At the time, it was the biggest reward placed on the head of a wanted criminal in India.

Gabbar was captured in Sagar district of Madhya Pradesh and a trial was conducted upon him into the town Khurai. It is said during his hearings in the court a large gathering of people would surround the area of court house to take a look at the dacoit.

In his autobiographical narrative The British, the Bandits and the Bordermen, Khusro Faramurz Rustamji then the IG (Inspector General) of Police in the Indian state of Madhya Pradesh, details that Gabbar had instilled so much fear in the areas of Dholpur, Bhind, Gwalior and Etawah that no one dared to leak any information regarding him.

== Death ==
He died on 13 November 1959, in Jagannath-Ka-Pur village of Bhind district during a gunbattle with the police force. Khusro Faramurz Rustamji, who earlier worked as special security officer to the first Prime Minister of India Jawaharlal Nehru, decided to present the news of Gabbar's death as a birthday gift to Nehru.

== In popular culture ==
- Rajagopal P. V., former Director General of Madhya Pradesh Police, who had gone after several dacoit gangs, edited the book on the criminal history of the real-life of Gabbar Singh during his retirement in Bangalore. The book was released in New Delhi.
- Hindi cinema has made several films based upon Gabbar Singh. The most notable film is Sholay, in which Gabbar Singh was played by Amjad Khan.
