= Hindi cinema =

- Main distributors: AA Films; B62 Studios; Dharma Productions; Eros International; Excel Entertainment; Maddock Films; Star Studio18; Red Chillies Entertainment; Reliance Entertainment; UTV Motion Pictures; Yash Raj Films; Zee Studios

Hindi cinema, popularly known as Bollywood, refers to India's Hindi-language film industry, based in Mumbai. The popular term Bollywood is a portmanteau of "Bombay" (another name for Mumbai) and "Hollywood". The industry, producing films in the Hindi language, is a part of the larger Indian cinema industry, which also includes South Indian cinema and other smaller film industries. The term 'Bollywood', often mistakenly used to refer to Indian cinema as a whole, only refers to Hindi-language films, with Indian cinema being an umbrella term that includes all the film industries in the country, each offering films in diverse languages and styles.

In 2017, Indian cinema produced 1,986 feature films, of which the largest number, 364, have been in Hindi. In 2022, Hindi cinema represented 33% of box office revenue, followed by Telugu and Tamil representing 20% and 16% respectively. Mumbai is one of the largest centres for film production in the world. Hindi films sold an estimated 341 million tickets in India in 2019. Earlier Hindi films tended to use vernacular Hindustani, mutually intelligible by speakers of either Hindi or Urdu, while modern Hindi productions increasingly incorporate elements of Hinglish.

The most popular commercial genre in Hindi cinema since the 1970s has been the masala film, which freely mixes different genres including action, comedy, romance, drama and melodrama along with musical numbers. Masala films generally fall under the musical film genre, of which Indian cinema has been the largest producer since the 1960s when it exceeded the American film industry's total musical output after musical films declined in the West. The first Indian talkie, Alam Ara (1931), was produced in the Hindustani language, four years after Hollywood's first sound film, The Jazz Singer (1927). In 2026, the devotional film Hanuman Ansh became the highest theatrical return on investment of all time along with another devotional film released in 1975 called Jai Santoshi Maa.

Alongside commercial masala films, a distinctive genre of art films known as parallel cinema has also existed, presenting realistic content and avoidance of musical numbers. In more recent years, the distinction between commercial masala and parallel cinema has been gradually blurring, with an increasing number of mainstream films adopting the conventions which were once strictly associated with parallel cinema.

== History ==
=== Early history (1890s–1930s) ===
In 1897, a film presentation by Professor Stevenson featured a stage show at Calcutta's Star Theatre. With Stevenson's encouragement and camera, Hiralal Sen, an Indian photographer, made a film of scenes from that show, The Flower of Persia (1898). The Wrestlers (1899) by H. S. Bhatavdekar showed a wrestling match at the Hanging Gardens in Bombay.

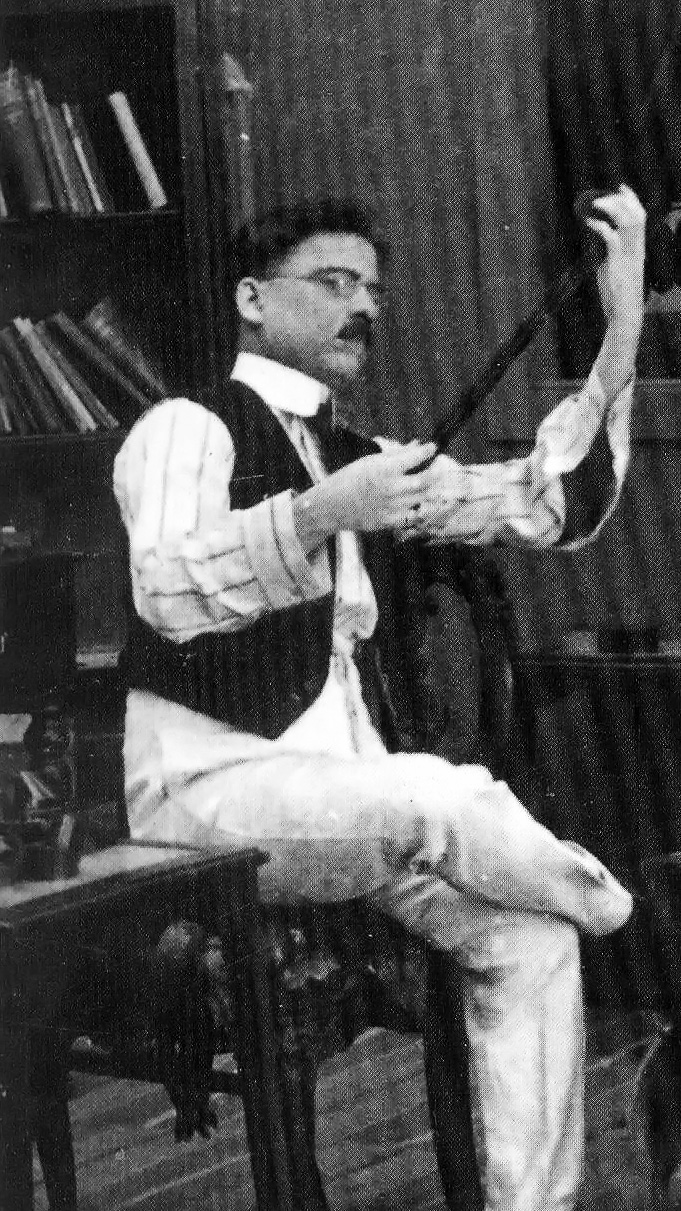
Dadasaheb Phalke is considered the father of Indian cinema, including Hindi cinema.

Dadasaheb Phalke's silent film Raja Harishchandra (1913) is the first feature-length film made in India. The film, being silent, had English, Marathi, and Hindi-language intertitles. By the 1930s, the Indian film industry as a whole was producing over 200 films per year. The first Indian sound film, Ardeshir Irani's Alam Ara (1931), made in Hindustani language, was commercially successful. With a great demand for talkies and musicals, Hindustani cinema (as Hindi cinema was then known as) and the other language film industries quickly switched to sound films.

=== Challenges and market expansion (1930s–1940s) ===
The 1930s and 1940s were tumultuous times; India was buffeted by the Great Depression, World War II, the Indian independence movement, and the violence of the Partition. Although most early Bombay films were unabashedly escapist, a number of filmmakers tackled tough social issues or used the struggle for Indian independence as a backdrop for their films. Irani made the first Hindi colour film, Kisan Kanya, in 1937. The following year, he made a colour version of Mother India. However, colour did not become a popular feature until the late 1950s. At this time, lavish romantic musicals and melodramas were cinematic staples.

Number of Hindi movies released since 1930. A rapid expansion was seen from the mid-1940s.

The decade of the 1940s saw an expansion of Bombay cinema's commercial market and its presence in the national consciousness. The year 1943 saw the arrival of Indian cinema's first 'blockbuster' offering, the movie Kismet, which grossed in excess of the important barrier of one crore (10 million) rupees, made on a budget of only two lakh (200,000) rupees. The film tackled contemporary issues, especially those arising from the Indian Independence movement, and went on to become "the longest running hit of Indian cinema", a title it held till the 1970s. Film personalities like Bimal Roy, Sahir Ludhianvi and Prithviraj Kapoor participated in the creation of a national movement against colonial rule in India, while simultaneously leveraging the popular political movement to increase their own visibility and popularity. Themes from the Independence Movement deeply influenced Bombay film directors, screen-play writers, and lyricists, who saw their films in the context of social reform and the problems of the common people.

Before the Partition, the Bombay film industry was closely linked to the Lahore film industry (known as "Lollywood"; now part of the Pakistani film industry); both produced films in Hindustani (also known as Hindi-Urdu), the lingua franca of northern and central India. Another centre of Hindustani-language film production was the Bengal film industry in Calcutta, Bengal Presidency (now Kolkata, West Bengal), which produced Hindustani-language films and local Bengali language films. Around the same time, filmmakers and actors from the Calcutta film industry began migrating to Bombay; as a result, Bombay became the center of Hindustani-language film production.

=== Golden age (late 1940s–1960s) ===
The period from the late 1940s to the early 1960s, after India's independence, is regarded by film historians as the Golden Age of Hindi cinema. Some of the most critically acclaimed Hindi films of all time were produced during this time. Examples include Pyaasa (1957) and Kaagaz Ke Phool (1959), directed by Guru Dutt; Awaara (1951) and Shree 420 (1955), directed by Raj Kapoor, and Aan (1952), directed by Mehboob Khan. The films explored social themes, primarily dealing with working-class life in India (particularly urban life) in the first two examples. Awaara presented the city as both nightmare and dream, and Pyaasa critiqued the unreality of urban life.

Guru Dutt was lauded for his artistry, notably his usage of close-up shots, lighting, and depictions of melancholia. He directed a total of Hindi films, several of which have gained a cult following internationally. This includes Pyaasa (1957), which made its way onto Time magazine's 100 Greatest Movies list, as well as Kaagaz Ke Phool (1959), all of which are frequently listed among the greatest films in Hindi cinema. He, along with Amitabh Bachchan, was included among CNN's "Top 25 Asian Actors" in 2012.

Mehboob Khan's Mother India (1957), a remake of his earlier Aurat (1940), was the first Indian film nominated for the Academy Award for Best Foreign Language Film; it lost by a single vote. Mother India defined conventional Hindi cinema for decades. It spawned a genre of dacoit films, in turn defined by Gunga Jumna (1961). Written and produced by Dilip Kumar, Gunga Jumna was a dacoit crime drama about two brothers on opposite sides of the law (a theme which became common in Indian films during the 1970s). Some of the best-known epic films of Hindi cinema were also produced at this time, such as K. Asif's Mughal-e-Azam (1960). Other acclaimed mainstream Hindi filmmakers during this period included Kamal Amrohi and Vijay Bhatt.

The three most popular male Indian actors of the 1950s and 1960s were Raj Kapoor, Dilip Kumar and Dev Anand, each with a unique acting style. Kapoor adopted Charlie Chaplin's tramp persona; Anand modeled himself on suave Hollywood stars like Gregory Peck and Cary Grant, and Kumar pioneered a form of method acting. Kumar, who was described as "the ultimate method actor" by Satyajit Ray. Veteran actresses such as Suraiya, Nargis, Sumitra Devi, Vyjayanthimala, Madhubala, Meena Kumari, Waheeda Rehman, Nutan, Sadhana and Mala Sinha have had their share of influence on Hindi cinema.

While commercial Hindi cinema was thriving, the 1950s also saw the emergence of a parallel cinema movement. Although the movement (emphasising social realism) was led by Bengali cinema, it also began gaining prominence in Hindi cinema. Early examples of parallel cinema include Dharti Ke Lal (1946), directed by Khwaja Ahmad Abbas and based on the Bengal famine of 1943, Neecha Nagar (1946) directed by Chetan Anand and written by Khwaja Ahmad Abbas, and Bimal Roy's Do Bigha Zamin (1953). Their critical acclaim and the latter's commercial success paved the way for Indian neorealism and the Indian New Wave (synonymous with parallel cinema). Internationally acclaimed Hindi filmmakers involved in the movement included Mani Kaul, Kumar Shahani, Ketan Mehta, Govind Nihalani, Shyam Benegal, and Vijaya Mehta.

After the social-realist film Neecha Nagar received the Palme d'Or at the inaugural 1946 Cannes Film Festival, Hindi films were frequently in competition for Cannes' top prize during the 1950s and early 1960s and some won major prizes at the festival. Guru Dutt, overlooked during his lifetime, received belated international recognition during the 1980s. Film critics polled by the British magazine Sight & Sound included several of Dutt's films in a 2002 list of greatest films, and Time's All-Time 100 Movies lists Pyaasa as one of the greatest films of all time.

During the late 1960s and early 1970s, the industry was dominated by musical romance films with romantic-hero leads.

=== Classic Hindi cinema (1970s–1980s) ===
By the 1970s, romantic confections had given way to gritty, violent crime films and action films about gangsters (the Bombay underworld) and bandits (dacoits). Salim-Javed's writing and Amitabh Bachchan as the "angry young man" popularised the trend with films such as Zanjeer and (particularly) Deewaar, a crime film inspired by Gunga Jumna which pitted "a policeman against his brother, a gang leader based on real-life smuggler Haji Mastan" (Bachchan); according to Danny Boyle, Deewaar was "absolutely key to Indian cinema". In addition to Bachchan, several other actors followed by riding the crest of the trend (which lasted into the early 1990s)., the screenwriting duo Salim–Javed (Salim Khan and Javed Akhtar) introduced the genre of the "angry young man" with the gritty, violent, Bombay underworld crime films Zanjeer (1973) and Deewaar (1975). Salim-Javed reinterpreted the rural themes of Mehboob Khan's Mother India (1957) and Nitin Bose's Gunga Jumna (1961) in "Deewaar", placing it in a contemporary urban context. The film reflected the socio-economic and socio-political climate of 1970s India, and channeled mass discontent, disillusionment and the unprecedented growth of slums with anti-establishment themes and those involving urban poverty, corruption and crime. Their "angry young man", personified by Amitabh Bachchan. Bachchan's dominance in the Indian film industry during the 1970s–80s led to him being described as a "one-man industry".

Actresses from the era include Hema Malini, Jaya Bachchan, Raakhee, Shabana Azmi, Zeenat Aman, Parveen Babi, Rekha, Dimple Kapadia, Smita Patil, Jaya Prada and Padmini Kolhapure.

The name "Bollywood" was coined during the 1970s, when the conventions of commercial Hindi films were defined. Key to this was the masala film, which combines a number of genres (action, comedy, romance, drama, melodrama, and musical). The masala film was pioneered early in the decade by filmmaker Manmohan Desai, Prakash Mehra and Nasir Hussain, and the Salim-Javed screenwriting duo, pioneering the Bollywood-blockbuster format. Yaadon Ki Baarat (1973), directed by Hussain and written by Salim-Javed, has been identified as the first masala film and the first quintessentially "Bollywood" film. Salim-Javed wrote more successful masala films during the 1970s and 1980s. Masala films made Amitabh Bachchan the biggest star of the period. A landmark of the genre was Amar Akbar Anthony (1977), directed by Manmohan Desai. Desai was considered the pioneer of making Masala films in the 1970s.

Both genres (masala and violent-crime films) are represented by the blockbuster Sholay (1975), directed by Ramesh Sippy and starring Dharmendra and Amitabh Bachchan. It combined the dacoit film with spaghetti Westerns, spawning the Dacoit Western (also known as the curry Western) which was popular during the 1970s. Sholay was declared the "Film of the Millennium" by BBC India in 1999. It topped the British Film Institute's "Top 10 Indian Films" of all time poll of 2002, and was voted the greatest Indian movie in a Sky Digital poll of one million British Indians in 2004. It was also included in the magazine Time's "Best of Bollywood" list in 2010, and in IBN Live's list of the "100 greatest Indian films of all time" in 2013. In 2023, Time Out ranked it #1 on its list of the "100 Best Bollywood Movies."

Some Hindi filmmakers, such as Shyam Benegal, Mani Kaul, Kumar Shahani, Ketan Mehta, Govind Nihalani and Vijaya Mehta, continued to produce realistic parallel cinema throughout the 1970s. Although the art film bent of the Film Finance Corporation was criticised during a 1976 Committee on Public Undertakings investigation which accused the corporation of not doing enough to encourage commercial cinema, the decade saw the rise of commercial cinema with films such as Sholay (1975) which consolidated Amitabh Bachchan's position as a star. The devotional classic Jai Santoshi Ma was also released that year.

By 1983, the Bombay film industry was generating an estimated annual revenue of ₹700 crore (₹ 7 billion, $693.14 million), equivalent to $2.24 billion (₹16,522 crore, ₹ 111.33 billion) when adjusted for inflation. By 1986, India's annual film output had increased from 741 films produced annually to 833 films annually, making India the world's largest film producer. The most internationally acclaimed Hindi film of the 1980s was Mira Nair's Salaam Bombay! (1988), which won the Camera d'Or at the 1988 Cannes Film Festival and was nominated for the Academy Award for Best Foreign Language Film.

=== New Hindi cinema (1990s onwards) ===
Known since the 1990s as "New Bollywood", contemporary Bollywood is linked to economic liberalization in India during the early 1990s. Early in the decade, the pendulum swung back toward family-centered romantic musicals, introducing a new generation of popular actors, including Aamir Khan, Ajay Devgan, Akshay Kumar, Hrithik Roshan, Shah Rukh Khan, and Salman Khan, who have starred in some of the highest-grossing Bollywood films between 1990's and 2010's. The 1990's also marked the entrance of new performers in art and independent films, some of which were commercially successful. The most influential example was Satya (1998), directed by Ram Gopal Varma and written by Anurag Kashyap. Its critical and commercial success led to the emergence of a genre known as Mumbai noir: urban films reflecting the city's social problems. This led to a resurgence of parallel cinema by the end of the decade. The films featured actors whose performances were often praised by critics.

The 2000s saw increased Bollywood recognition worldwide due to growing (and prospering) Indian diaspora overseas. Aditya Chopra and Karan Johar are considered to have started the "NRI phase" in Hindi cinema, which catered to the overseas population of Indians. The growth of the Indian economy and a demand for quality entertainment in this era led the country's film industry to new heights in production values, cinematography and screenwriting as well as technical advances in areas such as special effects and animation. Some of the largest production houses, among them Yash Raj Films and Dharma Productions were the producers of new modern films. Some popular films of the decade were Kaho Naa... Pyaar Hai (2000), Kabhi Khushi Kabhie Gham (2001), Gadar: Ek Prem Katha (2001), Lagaan (2001), Koi... Mil Gaya (2003), Kal Ho Naa Ho (2003), Munnabhai M.B.B.S. (2003), Veer-Zaara (2004), Rang De Basanti (2006), Lage Raho Munna Bhai (2006), Dhoom 2 (2006), Krrish (2006), and Jab We Met (2007), among others, showing the rise of new movie stars.

During the 2010s, the industry saw established stars such as making big-budget masala films like Dabangg (2010), Singham (2011), Ek Tha Tiger (2012), Son of Sardaar (2012), Rowdy Rathore (2012), Chennai Express (2013), Kick (2014) and Happy New Year (2014) with much-younger actresses. Although the films were often not praised by critics, they were commercially successful.

Most stars from the 2000s continued successful careers into the next decade, and the 2000s-2010s saw a new generation of popular actors in different films, including Ranbir Kapoor, Ranveer Singh, Kartik Aaryan and Vicky Kaushal among others. Among new conventions, female-centred films such as The Dirty Picture (2011), Kahaani (2012), and Queen (2014), Pink (2016), Raazi (2018), Gangubai Kathiawadi (2022) and Crew started gaining wide financial success.

== Influences on Hindi cinema ==
Moti Gokulsing and Wimal Dissanayake identify six major influences which have shaped Indian popular cinema:

- The branching structures of ancient Indian epics, like the Mahabharata and Ramayana. Indian popular films often have plots which branch off into sub-plots.
- Ancient Sanskrit drama, with its stylised nature and emphasis on spectacle in which music, dance and gesture combine "to create a vibrant artistic unit with dance and mime being central to the dramatic experience." Matthew Jones of De Montfort University also identifies the Sanskrit concept of rasa, or "the emotions felt by the audience as a result of the actor's presentation", as crucial to Bollywood films.
- Traditional folk theatre, which became popular around the 10th century with the decline of Sanskrit theater. Its regional traditions include the Jatra of Bengal, the Ramlila of Uttar Pradesh, and the Terukkuttu of Tamil Nadu.
- Parsi theatre, which "blended realism and fantasy, music and dance, narrative and spectacle, earthy dialogue and ingenuity of stage presentation, integrating them into a dramatic discourse of melodrama. The Parsi plays contained crude humour, melodious songs and music, sensationalism and dazzling stagecraft."
- Hollywood, where musicals were popular from the 1920s to the 1950s.
- Western musical television (particularly MTV), which has had an increasing influence since the 1990s. Its pace, camera angles, dance sequences and music may be seen in 2000s Indian films. An early example of this approach was Mani Ratnam's Bombay (1995).

During the early 20th century, Hindustani was the lingua franca of popular cultural performance across northern India and established in popular performance art traditions such as nautch dancing, Urdu poetry, and Parsi theater. Hindustani and related Hindi dialects were the most widely understood across northern India, and Hindustani became the standard language of early Indian talkies. Films based on "Persianate adventure-romances" led to a popular genre of "Arabian Nights cinema".

Scholars Chaudhuri Diptakirti and Rachel Dwyer and screenwriter Javed Akhtar identify Urdu literature as a major influence on Hindi cinema. Most of the screenwriters and scriptwriters of classic Hindi cinema came from Urdu literary backgrounds, from Khwaja Ahmad Abbas and Akhtar ul Iman to Salim–Javed and Rahi Masoom Raza; a handful came from other Indian literary traditions, such as Bengali and Hindi literature. Most of Hindi cinema's classic scriptwriters wrote primarily in Urdu, including Salim-Javed, Gulzar, Rajinder Singh Bedi, Inder Raj Anand, Rahi Masoom Raza and Wajahat Mirza. Urdu poetry and the ghazal tradition strongly influenced filmi (Bollywood lyrics). Javed Akhtar was also greatly influenced by Urdu novels by Pakistani author Ibn-e-Safi, such as the Jasoosi Dunya and Imran series of detective novels; they inspired, for example, famous Bollywood characters such as Gabbar Singh in Sholay (1975) and Mogambo in Mr. India (1987).

Todd Stadtman identifies several foreign influences on 1970s commercial Bollywood masala films, including New Hollywood, Italian exploitation films, and Hong Kong martial arts cinema. After the success of Bruce Lee films (such as Enter the Dragon) in India, Deewaar (1975) and other Bollywood films incorporated fight scenes inspired by 1970s martial arts films from Hong Kong cinema until the 1990s. Bollywood action scenes emulated Hong Kong rather than Hollywood, emphasising acrobatics and stunts and combining kung fu (as perceived by Indians) with Indian martial arts such as pehlwani.

Hindi cinema has been criticised as borrowing plots, scenes and music from other Indian films and from foreign films without proper credit. Critics state that this practice is enabled by weak copyright enforcement and low audience awareness of foreign media. Since the 1990s, copyright enforcement and international visibility have increased, however, there are still several instances of unlicensed remakes and copied soundtracks being created. Subsequent lawsuits have been filed by Hollywood film studios and foreign musicians. Some filmmakers defend such borrowing as remaking popular films in an Indian context and believe it is an integral part of globalization.

== Influence of Hindi cinema ==
=== India ===
Perhaps Hindi cinema's greatest influence has been on India's national identity, where (with the rest of Indian cinema) it has become part of the "Indian story". In India, Bollywood is often associated with India's national identity. According to economist and Bollywood biographer Meghnad Desai, "Cinema actually has been the most vibrant medium for telling India its own story, the story of its struggle for independence, its constant struggle to achieve national integration and to emerge as a global presence".

Scholar Brigitte Schulze has written that Indian films, most notably Mehboob Khan's Mother India (1957), played a key role in shaping the Republic of India's national identity in the early years after independence from the British Raj; the film conveyed a sense of Indian nationalism to urban and rural citizens alike. Bollywood has long influenced Indian society and culture as the biggest entertainment industry; many of the country's musical, dancing, wedding and fashion trends are Bollywood-inspired. Bollywood fashion trendsetters have included Madhubala in Mughal-e-Azam (1960) and Madhuri Dixit in Hum Aapke Hain Koun..! (1994).

Hindi films have also had a socio-political impact on Indian society, reflecting Indian politics. In classic 1970s Bollywood films, Bombay underworld crime films written by Salim–Javed and starring Amitabh Bachchan such as Zanjeer (1973) and Deewaar (1975) reflected the socio-economic and socio-political realities of contemporary India. They channeled growing popular discontent and disillusionment and state failure to ensure welfare and well-being at a time of inflation, shortages, loss of confidence in public institutions, increasing crime and the unprecedented growth of slums. Salim-Javed and Bachchan's films dealt with urban poverty, corruption and organised crime; they were perceived by audiences as anti-establishment, often with an "angry young man" protagonist presented as a vigilante or anti-hero whose suppressed rage voiced the anguish of the urban poor.

=== Overseas ===
Hindi films have been a significant form of soft power for India, increasing its influence and changing overseas perceptions of India. In Germany, Indian stereotypes included bullock carts, beggars, sacred cows, corrupt politicians, and catastrophes before Bollywood and the IT industry transformed global perceptions of India. According to author Roopa Swaminathan, "Bollywood cinema is one of the strongest global cultural ambassadors of a new India." Its role in expanding India's global influence is comparable to Hollywood's similar role with American influence. Monroe Township, Middlesex County, New Jersey, in the New York metropolitan area, has been profoundly impacted by Bollywood; this U.S. township has displayed one of the fastest growth rates of its Indian population in the Western Hemisphere, increasing from 256 (0.9%) as of the 2000 Census to an estimated 5,943 (13.6%) as of 2017, representing a 2,221.5% (a multiple of 23) numerical increase over that period, including many affluent professionals and senior citizens as well as charitable benefactors to the COVID-19 relief efforts in India in official coordination with Monroe Township, as well as actors with second homes.

During the 2000s, Hindi cinema began influencing musical films in the Western world and was instrumental role in reviving the American musical film. Baz Luhrmann said that his musical film, Moulin Rouge! (2001), was inspired by Bollywood musicals; the film incorporated a Bollywood-style dance scene with a song from the film China Gate. The critical and financial success of Moulin Rouge! began a renaissance of Western musical films such as Chicago, Rent, and Dreamgirls.

Indian film composer A. R. Rahman wrote the music for Andrew Lloyd Webber's Bombay Dreams, and a musical version of Hum Aapke Hain Koun was staged in London's West End. The sports film Lagaan (2001) was nominated for the Academy Award for Best Foreign Language Film, and two other Hindi films (2002's Devdas and 2006's Rang De Basanti) were nominated for the BAFTA Award for Best Film Not in the English Language.

Danny Boyle's Slumdog Millionaire (2008), which won four Golden Globes and eight Academy Awards, was inspired by mainstream Hindi films and is considered an "homage to Hindi commercial cinema". It was also inspired by Mumbai-underworld crime films, such as Deewaar (1975), Satya (1998), Company (2002) and Black Friday (2007). Deewaar had a Hong Kong remake, The Brothers (1979), which inspired John Woo's internationally acclaimed breakthrough A Better Tomorrow (1986); the latter was a template for Hong Kong action cinema's heroic bloodshed genre. "Angry young man" 1970s epics such as Deewaar and Amar Akbar Anthony (1977) also resemble the heroic-bloodshed genre of 1980s Hong Kong action cinema.

The influence of filmi may be seen in popular music worldwide. Technopop pioneers Haruomi Hosono and Ryuichi Sakamoto of the Yellow Magic Orchestra produced a 1978 electronic album, Cochin Moon, based on an experimental fusion of electronic music and Bollywood-inspired Indian music. Truth Hurts' 2002 song "Addictive", produced by DJ Quik and Dr. Dre, was lifted from Lata Mangeshkar's "Thoda Resham Lagta Hai" in Jyoti (1981). The Black Eyed Peas' Grammy Award winning 2005 song "Don't Phunk with My Heart" was inspired by two 1970s Bollywood songs: "Ye Mera Dil Yaar Ka Diwana" from Don (1978) and "Ae Nujawan Hai Sub" from Apradh (1972). Both songs were composed by Kalyanji Anandji, sung by Asha Bhosle, and featured the dancer Helen.

The Kronos Quartet re-recorded several R. D. Burman compositions sung by Asha Bhosle for their 2005 album, You've Stolen My Heart: Songs from R.D. Burman's Bollywood, which was nominated for Best Contemporary World Music Album at the 2006 Grammy Awards. Filmi music composed by A. R. Rahman (who received two Academy Awards for the Slumdog Millionaire soundtrack) has frequently been sampled by other musicians, including the Singaporean artist Kelly Poon, the French rap group La Caution and the American artist Ciara. Many Asian Underground artists, particularly those among the overseas Indian diaspora, have also been inspired by Bollywood music.

== Genres ==
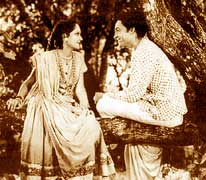
Melodrama and romance are common ingredients in Bollywood films, such as Achhut Kanya (1936)

Hindi films are primarily musicals, and are expected to have catchy song-and-dance numbers woven into the script. A film's success often depends on the quality of such musical numbers. A film's music, song, and dance portions are usually produced first, and these are often released before the film itself, increasing its audience.

Indian audiences expect value for money, and a good film is generally referred to as paisa vasool (literally, "money's worth"). Songs, dances, love triangles, comedy and dare-devil thrills are combined in a three-hour show (with an intermission). These are called masala films, after the Hindi word for a spice mixture. Like masalas, they are a mixture of action, comedy, and romance; most have heroes who can fight off villains single-handedly. Bollywood plots have tended to be melodramatic, frequently using formulaic ingredients such as star-crossed lovers, angry parents, love triangles, family ties, sacrifice, political corruption, kidnapping, villains, kind-hearted courtesans, long-lost relatives and siblings, reversals of fortune and serendipity.

Parallel cinema films tended to be less popular at the box office. A large Indian diaspora in English-speaking countries and increased Western influence in India have nudged Bollywood films closer to Hollywood.

According to film critic Lata Khubchandani, "Our earliest films ... had liberal doses of sex and kissing scenes in them. Strangely, it was after Independence [that] the censor board came into being and so did all the strictures." Although Bollywood plots feature Westernised urbanites dating and dancing in clubs rather than pre-arranged marriages, traditional Indian culture continues to exist outside the industry and is an element of resistance by some to Western influences. Bollywood plays a major role, however, in Indian fashion. Studies have indicated that some people, unaware that changing fashion in Bollywood films is often influenced by globalisation, consider the clothes worn by Bollywood actors as authentically Indian.

== Scripts, dialogues, and lyrics ==
Film scripts (known as dialogues in Indian English) and their song lyrics are often written by different people. Earlier, scripts were usually written in an unadorned Hindustani, which would be understood by the largest possible audience. Post-Independence, Hindi films tended to use a colloquial register of Hindustani, mutually intelligible by Hindi and Urdu speakers, but the use of the latter has declined over years. Some films have used regional dialects to evoke a village setting, or archaic Urdu in medieval historical films. A number of the dominant early scriptwriters of Hindi cinema primarily wrote in Urdu; Salim-Javed wrote in Urdu script, which was then transcribed by an assistant into Devanagari script so Hindi readers could read them. During the 1970s, Urdu writers Krishan Chander and Ismat Chughtai said that "more than seventy-five per cent of films are made in Urdu" but were categorised as Hindi films by the government. Encyclopedia of Hindi Cinema noted a number of top Urdu writers for preserving the language through film. Urdu poetry has strongly influenced Hindi film songs, whose lyrics also draw from the ghazal tradition (filmi-ghazal). According to Javed Akhtar in 1996, despite the loss of Urdu in Indian society, Urdu diction dominated Hindi film dialogue and lyrics.

In her book, The Cinematic ImagiNation, Jyotika Virdi wrote about the presence and decline of Urdu in Hindi films. Virdi notes that although Urdu was widely used in classic Hindi cinema decades after partition because it was widely taught in pre-partition India, its use has declined in modern Hindi cinema: "The extent of Urdu used in commercial Hindi cinema has not been stable ... the ultimate victory of Hindi in the official sphere has been more or less complete. This decline of Urdu is mirrored in Hindi films ... It is true that many Urdu words have survived and have become part of Hindi cinema's popular vocabulary. But that is as far as it goes. The fact is, for the most part, popular Hindi cinema has forsaken the florid Urdu that was part of its extravagance and retained a 'residual' Urdu, affected by an aggressive state policy that promoted a Sanskritized version of Hindi as the national language."

Contemporary mainstream films also use English, with the authors of an October 2005 South Asian Popular Culture article writing, "English has begun to challenge the ideological work done by Urdu." Some film scripts are first written in Latin script. Characters may shift between languages to evoke a particular atmosphere (for example, English in a business setting and Hindi in an informal one). The blend of Hindi and English sometimes heard in modern Hindi films, known as Hinglish, has become increasingly common.

Before and following the turn of the millennium, cinematic language (in dialogues or lyrics) would often be melodramatic, invoking God, family, mother, duty, and self-sacrifice. Song lyrics are often about love and, especially in older films, frequently used the poetic vocabulary of court Urdu, with a number of Persian loanwords. Another source for love lyrics in films such as Jhanak Jhanak Payal Baje and Lagaan is the long Hindu tradition of poetry about the loves of Krishna, Radha, and the gopis.

Music directors often prefer working with certain lyricists, and the lyricist and composer may be seen as a team. This phenomenon has been compared to the pairs of American composers and songwriters who created classic Broadway musicals.

Before 2008, Bollywood scripts were often handwritten because, in the industry, there is a perception that manual writing is the quickest way to create scripts.

== Sound ==
Sound in early Bollywood films was usually not recorded on location (sync sound). It was usually created (or re-created) in the studio, with the actors speaking their lines in the studio and sound effects added later; this created synchronisation problems. Commercial Indian films are known for their lack of ambient sound, and the Arriflex 3 camera necessitated dubbing. Lagaan (2001) was filmed with sync sound, and several Bollywood films have recorded on-location sound since then.

== Female makeup artists ==
In 1955, the Bollywood Cine Costume Make-Up Artist & Hair Dressers' Association (CCMAA) ruled that female makeup artists were barred from membership. The Supreme Court of India ruled in 2014 that the ban violated Indian constitutional guarantees under Article 14 (right to equality), 19(1)(g) (freedom to work) and Article 21 (right to liberty). According to the court, the ban had no "rationale nexus" to the cause sought to be achieved and was "unacceptable, impermissible and inconsistent" with the constitutional rights guaranteed to India's citizens. The court also found illegal the rule which mandated that for any artist to work in the industry, they must have lived for five years in the state where they intend to work. In 2015, it was announced that Charu Khurana was the first woman registered by the Cine Costume Make-Up Artist & Hair Dressers' Association.

== Song and dance ==
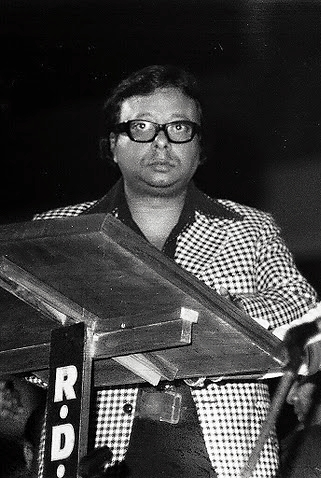
R. D. Burman is considered one of the most prolific and influential music director of Hindi cinema.

Bollywood film music is called filmi (from the Hindi "of films"). Bollywood songs were introduced with Ardeshir Irani's Alam Ara (1931) song, "De De Khuda Ke Naam pay pyaare". Bollywood songs are generally pre-recorded by professional playback singers, with the actors then lip syncing the words to the song on-screen (often while dancing). Although most actors are good dancers, few are also singers; a notable exception was Kishore Kumar, who starred in several major films during the 1950s while having a rewarding career as a playback singer. K. L. Saigal, Suraiyya, and Noor Jehan were known as singers and actors, and some actors in the last thirty years have sung one or more songs themselves.

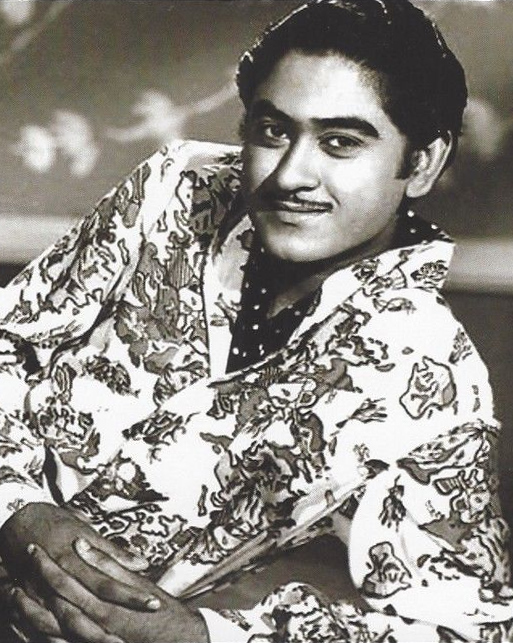
Kishore Kumar is regarded as one of the greatest, most influential and dynamic singers in the history of modern Indian music.

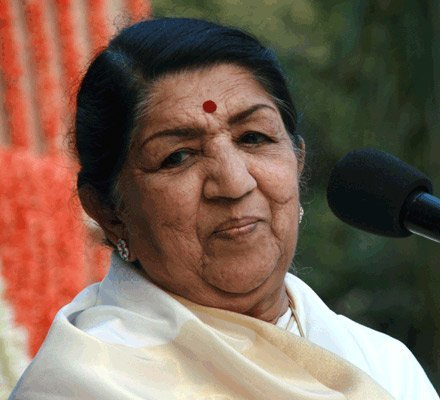
Lata Mangeshkar She is considered to be one of the greatest and most influential singers of the Indian subcontinent.

Songs can make and break a film, determining whether it will be a flop or a hit: "Few films without successful musical tracks, and even fewer without any songs and dances, succeed". Globalization has changed Bollywood music, with lyrics an increasing mix of Hindi and English. Global trends such as salsa, pop and hip hop have influenced the music heard in Bollywood films.

Playback singers are featured in the opening credits, and have fans who will see an otherwise-lackluster film to hear their favourites. Notable singers are Lata Mangeshkar, Asha Bhosle, Geeta Dutt, Shamshad Begum, Kavita Krishnamurthy, Sadhana Sargam, Alka Yagnik and Shreya Goshal (female), and K. L. Saigal, Kishore Kumar, Talat Mahmood, Mukesh, Mohammed Rafi, Manna Dey, Hemant Kumar, Kumar Sanu, Udit Narayan and Sonu Nigam (male). Composers of film music, known as music directors, are also well-known. Remixing of film songs with modern rhythms is common, and producers may release remixed versions of some of their films' songs with the films' soundtrack albums.

Dancing in Bollywood films, especially older films, is modeled on Indian dance: classical dance, dances of north-Indian courtesans (tawaif) or folk dances. In modern films, Indian dance blends with Western dance styles as seen on MTV or in Broadway musicals; Western pop and classical-dance numbers are commonly seen side-by-side in the same film. The hero (or heroine) often performs with a troupe of supporting dancers. Many song-and-dance routines in Indian films contain unrealistically-quick shifts of location or changes of costume between verses of a song. If the hero and heroine dance and sing a duet, it is often staged in natural surroundings or architecturally-grand settings.

Songs typically comment on the action taking place in the film. A song may be worked into the plot, so a character has a reason to sing. It may externalise a character's thoughts, or presage an event in the film (such as two characters falling in love). The songs are often referred to as a "dream sequence", with things happening which would not normally happen in the real world. Song and dance scenes were often filmed in Kashmir but, due to political unrest in Kashmir since the end of the 1980s, they have been shot in western Europe (particularly Switzerland and Austria).

Contemporary movie stars attracted popularity as dancers, including Madhuri Dixit, Hrithik Roshan, Aishwarya Rai Bachchan, Sridevi, Meenakshi Seshadri, Malaika Arora Khan, Shahid Kapoor, Katrina Kaif and Tiger Shroff. Older dancers include Helen (known for her cabaret numbers), Madhubala, Vyjanthimala, Padmini, Hema Malini, Mumtaz, Cuckoo Moray, Parveen Babi , Waheeda Rahman, Meena Kumari, and Shammi Kapoor.

Film producers have been releasing soundtracks (as tapes or CDs) before a film's release, hoping that the music will attract audiences; a soundtrack is often more popular than its film. Some producers also release music videos, usually (but not always) with a song from the film.

== Finances ==
Bollywood films are multi-million dollar productions, with the most expensive productions costing up to ₹ 1 billion (about US$20 million). The science-fiction film Ra.One was made on a budget of ₹ 1.35 billion (about $27 million), making it the most expensive Bollywood film of all time. Sets, costumes, special effects and cinematography were less than world-class, with some notable exceptions, until the mid-to-late 1990s. As Western films and television are more widely distributed in India, there is increased pressure for Bollywood films to reach the same production levels (particularly in action and special effects). Recent Bollywood films, like Krrish (2006), have employed international technicians such as Hong Kong-based action choreographer Tony Ching. The increasing accessibility of professional action and special effects, coupled with rising film budgets, have seen an increase in action and science-fiction films.

Since overseas scenes are attractive at the box office, Mumbai film crews are filming in Australia, Canada, New Zealand, the United Kingdom, the United States, Europe and elsewhere. Indian producers have also obtained funding for big-budget films shot in India, such as Lagaan and Devdas.

Funding for Bollywood films often comes from private distributors and a few large studios. Although Indian banks and financial institutions had been forbidden from lending to film studios, the ban has been lifted. Finances are not regulated; some funding comes from illegitimate sources such as the Mumbai underworld, which is known to influence several prominent film personalities. Mumbai organised-crime hitmen shot Rakesh Roshan, a film director and father of star Hrithik Roshan, in January 2000. In 2001, the Central Bureau of Investigation seized all prints of Chori Chori Chupke Chupke after the film was found to be funded by members of the Mumbai underworld.

Another problem facing Bollywood is widespread copyright infringement of its films. Often, bootleg DVD copies of movies are available before they are released in cinemas. Manufacturing of bootleg DVD, VCD, and VHS copies of the latest movie titles is an established small-scale industry in parts of south and southeast Asia. The Federation of Indian Chambers of Commerce and Industry (FICCI) estimates that the Bollywood industry loses $100 million annually from unlicensed home videos and DVDs. In addition to the homegrown market, demand for these copies is large amongst portions of the Indian diaspora. Bootleg copies are the only way people in Pakistan can watch Bollywood movies, since the Pakistani government has banned their sale, distribution and telecast. Films are frequently broadcast without compensation by small cable-TV companies in India and other parts of South Asia. Small convenience stores, run by members of the Indian diaspora in the US and the UK, regularly stock tapes and DVDs of dubious provenance; consumer copying adds to the problem. The availability of illegal copies of movies on the Internet also contributes to industry losses.

Satellite TV, television and imported foreign films are making inroads into the domestic Indian entertainment market. In the past, most Bollywood films could make money; now, fewer do. Most Bollywood producers make money, however, recouping their investments from many sources of revenue (including the sale of ancillary rights). There are increasing returns from theatres in Western countries like the United Kingdom, Canada, and the United States, where Bollywood is slowly being noticed. As more Indians migrate to these countries, they form a growing market for upscale Indian films. In 2002, Bollywood sold 3.6 billion tickets and had a total revenue (including theatre tickets, DVDs and television) of $1.3 billion; Hollywood films sold 2.6 billion tickets, and had a total revenue of $51 billion.

== Advertising ==
A number of Indian artists hand-painted movie billboards and posters. M. F. Husain painted film posters early in his career; human labour was found to be cheaper than printing and distributing publicity material. Most of the large, ubiquitous billboards in India's major cities are now created with computer-printed vinyl. Old hand-painted posters, once considered ephemera, are collectible folk art.

Releasing film music, or music videos, before a film's release may be considered a form of advertising. A popular tune is believed to help attract audiences. Bollywood publicists use the Internet as a venue for advertising. Most bigger-budget films have a websites on which audiences can view trailers, stills and information on the story, cast, and crew. Bollywood is also used to advertise other products. Product placement, used in Hollywood, is also common in Bollywood.

== International filming ==
Bollywood's increasing use of international settings such as Switzerland, London, Paris, New York, Mexico, Brazil and Singapore does not necessarily represent the people and cultures of those locales. Contrary to these spaces and geographies being filmed as they are, they are actually Indianised by adding Bollywood actors and Hindi speaking extras to them. While immersing in Bollywood films, viewers get to see their local experiences duplicated in different locations around the world.

According to Shakuntala Rao, "Media representation can depict India's shifting relation with the world economy, but must retain its 'Indianness' in moments of dynamic hybridity"; "Indianness" (cultural identity) poses a problem with Bollywood's popularity among varied diaspora audiences, but gives its domestic audience a sense of uniqueness from other immigrant groups.

== Awards ==
The Filmfare Awards are some of the most prominent awards given to Hindi films in India. The Indian screen magazine Filmfare began the awards in 1954 (recognising the best films of 1953), and they were originally known as the Clare Awards after the magazine's editor. Modeled on the Academy of Motion Picture Arts and Sciences' poll-based merit format, individuals may vote in separate categories. A dual voting system was developed in 1956.

The National Film Awards were also introduced in 1954. The Indian government has sponsored the awards, given by its Directorate of Film Festivals (DFF), since 1973. The DFF screens Bollywood films, films from the other regional movie industries, and independent/art films. The awards are made at an annual ceremony presided over by the president of India. Unlike the Filmfare Awards, which are chosen by the public and a committee of experts, the National Film Awards are decided by a government panel.

Other awards ceremonies for Hindi films in India are the Screen Awards (begun in 1995) and the Stardust Awards, which began in 2003. The International Indian Film Academy Awards (begun in 2000) and the Zee Cine Awards, begun in 1998, are held abroad in a different country each year.

== Global markets ==
In addition to their popularity among the Indian diaspora from Nigeria and Senegal to Egypt and Russia, generations of non-Indians have grown up with Bollywood. Indian cinema's early contacts with other regions made inroads into the Soviet Union, the Middle East, Southeast Asia, and China. Bollywood entered the consciousness of Western audiences and producers during the late 20th century, and Western actors now seek roles in Bollywood films.

=== Asia-Pacific ===
==== South Asia ====
Bollywood films are also popular in Bangladesh, Pakistan and Nepal, where Hindustani language is widely understood. Many Pakistanis understand Hindi, due to its linguistic similarity to Urdu. Although Pakistan banned the import of Bollywood films in 1965, trade in unlicensed DVDs and illegal cable broadcasts ensured their continued popularity. Exceptions to the ban were made for a few films, such as the colourised re-release of Mughal-e-Azam and Taj Mahal in 2006. Early in 2008, the Pakistani government permitted the import of 16 films. More easing followed in 2009 and 2010. Although it is opposed by nationalists and representatives of Pakistan's small film industry, it is embraced by cinema owners who are making a profit after years of low receipts. Bollywood films in Nepal earn more than Nepali films, and Salman Khan, Akshay Kumar and Shah Rukh Khan are popular in the country.

The films are also popular in Afghanistan due to its proximity to the Indian subcontinent and their cultural similarities, particularly in music. Popular actors include Shah Rukh Khan, Ajay Devgan, Sunny Deol, Aishwarya Rai, Preity Zinta, and Madhuri Dixit. A number of Bollywood films were filmed in Afghanistan and some dealt with the country, including Dharmatma, Kabul Express, Khuda Gawah and Escape From Taliban.

==== Southeast Asia ====
Bollywood films are popular in Southeast Asia, particularly in maritime Southeast Asia. The three Khans are very popular in the Malay world, including Indonesia, Malaysia, and Singapore. The films are also fairly popular in Thailand.

India has cultural ties with Indonesia, and Bollywood films were introduced to the country at the end of World War II in 1945. The "angry young man" films of Amitabh Bachchan and Salim–Javed were popular during the 1970s and 1980s before Bollywood's popularity began gradually declining in the 1980s and 1990s. It experienced an Indonesian revival with the release of Shah Rukh Khan's Kuch Kuch Hota Hai (1998) in 2001, which was a bigger box-office success in the country than Titanic (1997). Bollywood has had a strong presence in Indonesia since then, particularly Shah Rukh Khan films such as Mohabbatein (2000), Kabhi Khushi Kabhie Gham (2001), Kal Ho Naa Ho, Chalte Chalte and Koi... Mil Gaya (all 2003), and Veer-Zaara (2004).

==== East Asia ====
Some Bollywood films have been widely appreciated in China, Japan, and South Korea. Several Hindi films have been commercially successful in Japan, including Mehboob Khan's Aan (1952, starring Dilip Kumar) and Aziz Mirza's Raju Ban Gaya Gentleman (1992, starring Shah Rukh Khan). The latter sparked a two-year boom in Indian films after its 1997 release, with Dil Se.. (1998) a beneficiary of the boom. The highest-grossing Hindi film in Japan is 3 Idiots (2009), starring Aamir Khan, which received a Japanese Academy Award nomination. The film was also a critical and commercial success in South Korea.

Dr. Kotnis Ki Amar Kahani, Awaara, and Do Bigha Zamin were successful in China during the 1940s and 1950s, and remain popular with their original audience. Few Indian films were commercially successful in the country during the 1970s and 1980s, among them Tahir Hussain's Caravan, Noorie and Disco Dancer. Indian film stars popular in China included Raj Kapoor, Nargis, and Mithun Chakraborty. Hindi films declined significantly in popularity in China during the 1980s. Films by Aamir Khan have recently been successful, and Lagaan was the first Indian film with a nationwide Chinese release in 2011. Chinese filmmaker He Ping was impressed by Lagaan (particularly its soundtrack), and hired its composer A. R. Rahman to score his Warriors of Heaven and Earth (2003).

When 3 Idiots was released in China, China was the world's 15th-largest film market (partly due to its widespread pirate DVD distribution at the time). The pirate market introduced the film to Chinese audiences, however, and it became a cult hit. According to the Douban film-review site, 3 Idiots is China's 12th-most-popular film of all time; only one domestic Chinese film (Farewell My Concubine) ranks higher, and Aamir Khan acquired a large Chinese fan base as a result. After 3 Idiots, several of Khan's other films (including 2007's Taare Zameen Par and 2008's Ghajini) also developed cult followings. China became the world's second-largest film market (after the United States) by 2013, paving the way for Khan's box-office success with Dhoom 3 (2013), PK (2014), and Dangal (2016). The latter is the 16th-highest-grossing film in China, the fifth-highest-grossing non-English language film worldwide, and the highest-grossing non-English foreign film in any market. Several Khan films, including Taare Zameen Par, 3 Idiots, and Dangal, are highly rated on Douban. His next film, Secret Superstar (2017, starring Zaira Wasim), broke Dangal's record for the highest-grossing opening weekend by an Indian film and cemented Khan's status as "a king of the Chinese box office"; Secret Superstar was China's highest-grossing foreign film of 2018 to date. Khan has become a household name in China, with his success described as a form of Indian soft power improving China–India relations despite political tensions. With Bollywood competing with Hollywood in the Chinese market, the success of Khan's films has driven up the price for Chinese distributors of Indian film imports. Salman Khan's Bajrangi Bhaijaan and Irrfan Khan's Hindi Medium were also Chinese hits in early 2018.

==== Oceania ====
Although Bollywood is less successful on some Pacific islands such as New Guinea, it ranks second to Hollywood in Fiji (with its large Indian minority), Australia and New Zealand. Australia also has a large South Asian diaspora, and Bollywood is popular amongst non-Asians in the country as well. Since 1997, the country has been a backdrop for an increasing number of Bollywood films. Indian filmmakers, attracted to Australia's diverse locations and landscapes, initially used the country as a setting for song-and-dance scenes; however, Australian locations now figure in Bollywood film plots. Hindi films shot in Australia usually incorporate Australian culture. Yash Raj Films' Salaam Namaste (2005), the first Indian film shot entirely in Australia, was the most successful Bollywood film of 2005 in that country. It was followed by the box-office successes Heyy Babyy, (2007) Chak De! India (2007), and Singh Is Kinng (2008). Prime Minister John Howard said during a visit to India after the release of Salaam Namaste that he wanted to encourage Indian filmmaking in Australia to increase tourism, and he appointed Steve Waugh as tourism ambassador to India. Australian actress Tania Zaetta, who appeared in Salaam Namaste and several other Bollywood films, was eager to expand her career in Bollywood.

=== Eastern Europe and Central Asia ===
Bollywood films are popular in the former Soviet Union (Russia, Eastern Europe, and Central Asia), and have been dubbed into Russian. Indian films were more popular in the Soviet Union than Hollywood films and, sometimes, domestic Soviet films. The first Indian film released in the Soviet Union was Dharti Ke Lal (1946), directed by Khwaja Ahmad Abbas and based on the Bengal famine of 1943, in 1949. Three hundred Indian films were released in the Soviet Union after that; most were Bollywood films with higher average audience figures than domestic Soviet productions. Fifty Indian films had over 20 million viewers, compared to 41 Hollywood films. Some, such as Awaara (1951) and Disco Dancer (1982), had more than 60 million viewers and established actors Raj Kapoor, Nargis, Rishi Kapoor and Mithun Chakraborty in the country.

According to diplomat Ashok Sharma, who served in the Commonwealth of Independent States,

The popularity of Bollywood in the CIS dates back to the Soviet days when the films from Hollywood and other Western cinema centers were banned in the Soviet Union. As there was no means of other cheap entertainment, the films from Bollywood provided the Soviets a cheap source of entertainment as they were supposed to be non-controversial and non-political. In addition, the Soviet Union was recovering from the onslaught of the Second World War. The films from India, which were also recovering from the disaster of partition and the struggle for freedom from colonial rule, were found to be a good source of providing hope with entertainment to the struggling masses. The aspirations and needs of the people of both countries matched to a great extent. These films were dubbed in Russian and shown in theatres throughout the Soviet Union. The films from Bollywood also strengthened family values, which was a big factor for their popularity with the government authorities in the Soviet Union.

After the collapse of the Soviet film-distribution system, Hollywood filled the void in the Russian film market and Bollywood's market share shrank.

In Poland, Shah Rukh Khan has a large following. He was introduced to Polish audiences with the 2005 release of Kabhi Khushi Kabhie Gham (2001) and his other films, including Dil Se.. (1998), Main Hoon Na (2004) and Kabhi Alvida Naa Kehna (2006), became hits in the country. Bollywood films are often covered in Gazeta Wyborcza, formerly Poland's largest newspaper.

Squad (2021) is the first Indian film to be shot in Belarus. A majority of the film was shot at Belarusfilm studios, in Minsk.

=== Middle East and North Africa ===
Hindi films have become popular in Arab countries, and imported Indian films are usually subtitled in Arabic when they are released. Bollywood has progressed in Israel since the early 2000s, with channels dedicated to Indian films on cable television; MBC Bollywood and Zee Aflam show Hindi movies and serials.

In Egypt, Bollywood films were popular during the 1970s and 1980s. In 1987, however, they were restricted to a handful of films by the Egyptian government. Amitabh Bachchan has remained popular in the country and Indian tourists visiting Egypt are asked, "Do you know Amitabh Bachchan?"

Bollywood movies are regularly screened in Dubai cinemas, and Bollywood is becoming popular in Turkey; Barfi! was the first Hindi film to have a wide theatrical release in that country. Bollywood also has viewers in Central Asia (particularly Uzbekistan and Tajikistan).

=== South America ===
Bollywood films are not influential in most of South America, although its culture and dance is recognised. Due to significant South Asian diaspora communities in Suriname and Guyana, however, Hindi-language movies are popular. In 2006, Dhoom 2 became the first Bollywood film to be shot in Rio de Janeiro. In January 2012, it was announced that UTV Motion Pictures would begin releasing films in Peru with Guzaarish.

=== Africa ===
Hindi films were originally distributed to some parts of Africa by Lebanese businessmen. In the 1950s, Hindi and Egyptian films were generally more popular than Hollywood films in East Africa. By the 1960s, East Africa was one of the largest overseas export markets for Indian films, accounting for about 20-50% of global earnings for many Indian films.

Mother India (1957) continued to be screened in Nigeria decades after its release. Indian movies have influenced Hausa clothing, songs have been covered by Hausa singers, and stories have influenced Nigerian novelists. Stickers of Indian films and stars decorate taxis and buses in Nigeria's Northern Region, and posters of Indian films hang on the walls of tailoring shops and mechanics' garages. Unlike Europe and North America, where Indian films cater to the expatriate market, Bollywood films became popular in West Africa despite the lack of a significant Indian audience. One possible explanation is cultural similarity: the wearing of turbans, animals in markets; porters carrying large bundles, and traditional wedding celebrations. Within Muslim culture, Indian movies were said to show "respect" toward women; Hollywood movies were seen as having "no shame". In Indian movies, women are modestly dressed; men and women rarely kiss and there is no nudity, so the films are said to "have culture" which Hollywood lacks. The latter "don't base themselves on the problems of the people"; Indian films are based on socialist values and the reality of developing countries emerging from years of colonialism. Indian movies permitted a new youth culture without "becoming Western." The first Indian film shot in Mauritius was Souten, starring Rajesh Khanna, in 1983.

In South Africa, film imports from India were watched by black and Indian audiences. Several Bollywood figures have travelled to Africa for films and off-camera projects. Padmashree Laloo Prasad Yadav (2005) was filmed in South Africa. Dil Jo Bhi Kahey... (2005) was also filmed almost entirely in Mauritius, which has a large ethnic-Indian population.

Bollywood, however, seems to be diminishing in popularity in Africa. New Bollywood films are more sexually explicit and violent. Nigerian viewers observed that older films (from the 1950s and 1960s) had more culture and were less Westernised. The old days of India avidly "advocating decolonization ... and India's policy was wholly influenced by his missionary zeal to end racial domination and discrimination in the African territories" were replaced. The emergence of Nollywood (West Africa's film industry) has also contributed to the declining popularity of Bollywood films, as sexualised Indian films became more like American films.

Kishore Kumar and Amitabh Bachchan have been popular in Egypt and Somalia. In Ethiopia, Bollywood movies are shown with Hollywood productions in town square theatres such as the Cinema Ethiopia in Addis Ababa. Less-commercial Bollywood films are also screened elsewhere in North Africa.

=== Western Europe and North America ===
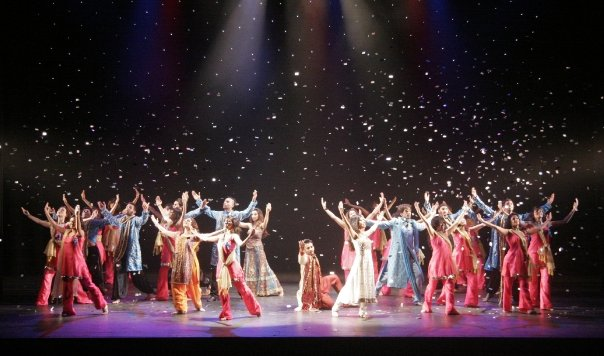
Bollywood dancing show in London

The first Indian film to be released in the Western world and receive mainstream attention was Aan (1952), directed by Mehboob Khan and starring Dilip Kumar and Nimmi. It was subtitled in 17 languages and released in 28 countries, including the United Kingdom, the United States, and France. Aan received significant praise from British critics, and The Times compared it favourably to Hollywood productions. Mehboob Khan's later Academy Award-nominated Mother India (1957) was a success in overseas markets, including Europe, Russia, the Eastern Bloc, French territories, and Latin America.

Many Bollywood films have been commercially successful in the United Kingdom. The most successful Indian actor at the British box office has been Shah Rukh Khan, whose popularity in British Asian communities played a key role in introducing Bollywood to the UK with films such as Darr (1993), Dilwale Dulhaniya Le Jayenge (1995), and Kuch Kuch Hota Hai (1998). Dil Se (1998) was the first Indian film to enter the UK top ten. A number of Indian films, such as Dilwale Dulhaniya Le Jayenge and Kabhi Khushi Kabhie Gham (2001), have been set in London.

Bollywood is also appreciated in France, Germany, the Netherlands, and Scandinavia. Bollywood films are dubbed in German and shown regularly on the German television channel RTL II. Germany is the second-largest European market for Indian films, after the United Kingdom. The most recognised Indian actor in Germany is Shah Rukh Khan, who has had box-office success in the country with films such as Don 2 (2011) and Om Shanti Om (2007). He has a large German fan base, particularly in Berlin (where the tabloid Die Tageszeitung compared his popularity to that of the pope).

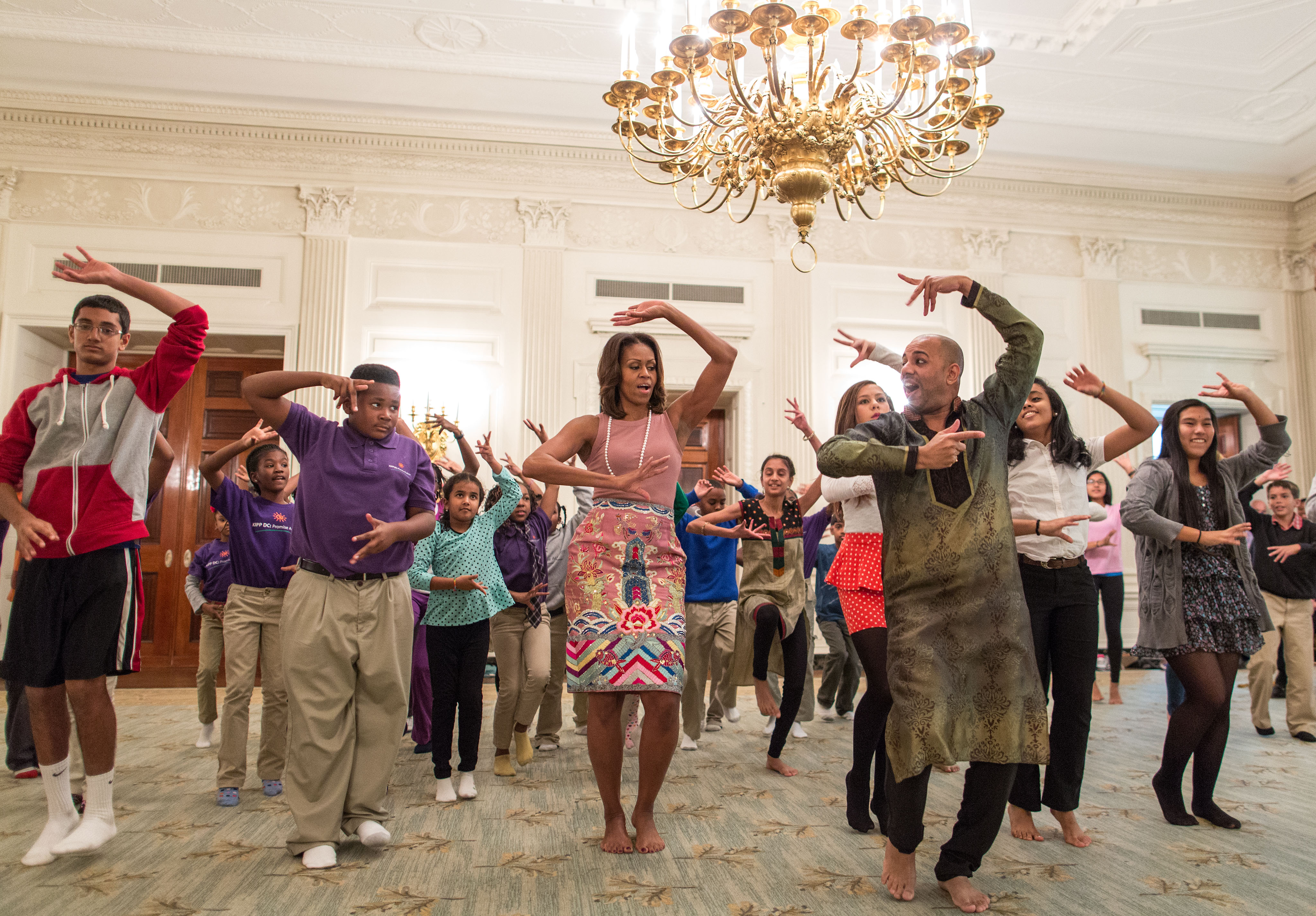
Michelle Obama joining students for a Bollywood dance clinic with Nakul Dev Mahajan in the White House State Dining Room, 2013

Bollywood has experienced revenue growth in Canada and the United States, particularly in the South Asian communities of large cities such as Toronto, Chicago, and New York City. Yash Raj Films, one of India's largest production houses and distributors, reported in September 2005 that Bollywood films in the United States earned about $100 million per year in theatre screenings, video sales and the sale of movie soundtracks; Indian films earn more money in the United States than films from any other non-English speaking country. Since the mid-1990s, a number of Indian films have been largely (or entirely) shot in New York, Los Angeles, Vancouver or Toronto. Films such as The Guru (2002) and Marigold: An Adventure in India (2007) attempted to popularise Bollywood for Hollywood.

== See also ==
- Angry Young Men (mini series)
- The Romantics (TV series)
- The Roshans
- Lists of Hindi films
  - List of highest-grossing Hindi films
  - List of highest domestic net collection of Hindi films
- Hindi film distribution circuits
- Central Board of Film Certification
- Noida Film City
- Film City, Mumbai
- Film and Television Institute of India
- Sexism in Bollywood
- Hindutva boycott of Hindi cinema

== Bibliography ==
- Gulzar; Nihalani, Govind; Chatterjee, Saibal (2003). Encyclopaedia of Hindi Cinema. Encyclopaedia Britannica (India). ISBN 978-81-7991-066-5.
- Mazumdar, Ranjani (2007). Bombay Cinema: An Archive of the City. University of Minnesota Press. ISBN 978-1-4529-1302-5.
