= Gabbar Singh (character) =

Fictional character

- Sholay character
- Amjad Khan as Gabbar Singh in Sholay
- First appearance: Sholay (1975)
- Last appearance: Ramgarh Ke Sholay (1991)
- Created by: Salim-Javed (Salim Khan and Javed Akhtar)
- Portrayed by: Amjad Khan

In-universe information
- Gender: Male
- Title: Sardar
- Occupation: Dacoit
- Relatives: Hari Singh (father)
- Nationality: Indian

Gabbar Singh is a fictional character and the antagonist of the 1975 Bollywood film Sholay. It was written by the duo Salim–Javed, consisting of Salim Khan and Javed Akhtar. Played by Amjad Khan, he is depicted in Sholay as a dacoit with an evil laugh much like "El Indio", the robber, from the Western film For a Few Dollars More, who leads a group in looting and plundering the villages in the region of Ramgarh. He has a sadistic personality and insists on killing whenever required to continue his status and to take revenge on his enemies. The character is considered to be one of the most iconic villains in Indian cinema. He was featured in the 1991 spoof Ramgarh Ke Sholay, with Khan portraying a parody version of the character.

== Development ==
Gabbar Singh was modelled on Gabbar Singh, a dacoit who had menaced the villages around Gwalior in the 1950s. Any policeman captured had his ears, and nose cut off, and was released as a warning to other policemen. The fictional Gabbar Singh was also inspired by larger-than-life characters in Pakistani author Ibn-e-Safi's Urdu novels. Sippy wanted to avoid the clichéd idea of a man becoming a dacoit due to societal issues, as was the case in other Indian films, and focused on Gabbar being an emblem of pure evil. To emphasise the point of Gabbar being a new type of villain, Sippy avoided the typical tropes of dacoits wearing dhotis and pagris and sporting a Tika and worshipping "Ma Bhavani"; Gabbar would be wearing army fatigues.

Danny Denzongpa was the first choice of Gabbar but had to miss out because he was shooting for Dharmatma in Afghanistan. Amjad Khan was almost dropped from the project because Javed Akhtar found his voice too weak for Gabbar Singh's role but was later convinced. For his preparation for the role Amjad read Abhishapth Chambal, a book on Chambal dacoits written by Taroon Kumar Bhaduri (actress Jaya Bhaduri's father). Sanjeev Kumar also wanted to play the role of Gabbar Singh, but Salim-Javed "felt he had the audience's sympathy through roles he'd done before; Gabbar had to be completely hateful."

== Style of speech ==
Javed Akhtar said Gabbar "seemed to acquire life and vocabulary of his own" as he wrote the film. His sadism lies in his choice of words like "Khurach, khurach" (scratch) when he talks to Basanti (Hema Malini). Gabbar's style of speech was a mix of Khariboli and Awadhi, inspired by Dilip Kumar's dacoit character Gunga from the 1961 film Gunga Jumna.

== In popular culture ==
Gabbar Singh's famous laughter
From Sholay Audio cassette , performed by Amjad Khan.This laugh was one of the main features of the role.

Amjad shot to stardom with the film. His mannerisms and dialogues have become an integral part of Bollywood lexicon. Sholay went on to become a blockbuster, and at the time, it became the highest-grossing movie in India. Although the film boasted an ensemble cast of superstars including Dharmendra and Amitabh Bachchan, he stole the thunder with his unorthodox and eerie dialogue delivery that was perfectly opposite to the total lack of empathy his character was supposed to convey. Even after four decades, people fondly remember his dialogues and mannerisms. He later appeared in advertisements as Gabbar Singh endorsing Britannia Glucose Biscuits (Popularly knowns as "Gabbar Ki Asli Pasand"), and it was the first incidence of a villain being used to sell a popular product. The role of Gabbar Singh was so deep-rooted in people's mind those days that Amjad Khan was known for the rest of his life by this role alone and wherever he went he had to speak some dialogues from the film to amuse the public because the dialogues are very popular among the audiences of Indian cinema.

The BBC have compared the impact of Gabbar Singh on Bollywood to the impact that Darth Vader later had on Hollywood. According to Anupama Chopra, "He's like Darth Vader in Star Wars, pure evil, utterly terrifying and a cool baddie".

In 2011, Amitabh Bachchan told a contestant on his Kaun Banega Crorepati TV show that when Amjad Khan visited their home, his son Abhishek Bachchan ran to him and said "Papa, Gabbar Singh aaya hai" (transl. Father, Gabbar Singh is here!), and Bachchan had to convince his son that Gabbar was just a character played by Khan.

Gabbar Singh has long been a subject of parodies and jokes in the popular Indian media. Filmfare named Gabbar Singh the most iconic villain in the history of Indian cinema.

In Jai Hind (1994) comedian Senthil says "Arre O Sambha" while appearing as a dacoit.

In the 2012 film Gabbar Singh, the character has been referenced by protagonist Venkataratnam Naidu (played by Telugu actor Pawan Kalyan), nicknaming himself after Gabbar Singh's character. Constable Ram Prasad (Ali) is nicknamed 'Samba' after Gabbar Singh's sidekick. In the sequel Sardaar Gabbar Singh (2016 film), Pawan reprises his role, albeit with 'Sardaar' in front of his name, referring to the title given by Gabbar Singh's henchmen. Both Telugu films contain dialogues made famous by Sholay's antagonist, e.g.,"Joh darr gaya... samjho marr gaya" (transl. Whoever is afraid... consider them dead).

In the 2015 film Gabbar is Back, the protagonist Aditya Singh Rajput (portrayed by Akshay Kumar) resembles Gabbar Singh and he also nicknamed himself after Gabbar's character.

== Bibliography ==
- Chopra, Anupama (2000). Sholay, The Making of a Classic. Penguin Books. ISBN 978-0-14-029970-0. Archived from the original on 27 October 2011.
- Khan, Mohammad Zahir (1981). Dacoity in Chambal Valley. National.
