= Imran =

- Pronunciation: Arabic: [ˈʕɪmˌraːn]
- Gender: Male

Origin
- Origin: Arabic
- Meaning: Amram
- Region of origin: Middle East

Other names
- Related names: Amram, Joachim

Imran, Imraan, Emraan, or Emran (Arabic: عمران ʿImrān) is a masculine given name and surname of Arabic origin. The name Imran is found in the Quranic chapter called Family of ʿImrān (āl ʿImrān). Notable people with the name include:

== Given name ==
=== Emraan ===
- Emraan Ali (born 1967), Trinidadian-American terrorist
- Emraan Hashmi (born 1979), Indian actor

=== Emran ===
- Emran El-Badawi, American Islamic scholar
- Emran bin Bahar (born 1961), Bruneian diplomat
- Emran Ahmed Chowdhury (born 1967), Bangladeshi lawyer and politician
- Emran Feroz (born 1991), Austrian-Afghan journalist and author
- Emran Ramadani (born 1992), Macedonian footballer
- Emran Ali Sarkar (1912–2007), Bangladeshi politician
- Emran Soglo (born 2005), French-English footballer

=== Imraan ===
- Imraan Coovadia (born 1970), South African novelist, essayist, and academic
- Imraan Faruque (born 1984), American-Indian designer
- Imraan Khan (born 1984), South African cricketer
- Imraan Khan (cricketer, born January 1984) (born 1984), South African cricketer
- Imraan Mohammad (born 1976), English cricketer
- Imraan Moosa (born 1961), South African politician
- Imraan Valodia (born 1965), South African economist

=== Imran ===
- Imran Abbas (born 1982), Pakistani actor
- Imran Abbas (cricketer) (born 1978), Pakistani cricketer
- Imran Abdulla, Maldivian politician and religious scholar
- Imran Ahmad (born 1948), Bangladeshi politician and businessman
- Imran Ahmad (admiral), Pakistan Navy officer
- Imran Ahmed (cricketer) (born 1981), Bangladeshi cricketer
- Imran Ahmed (strategist) (born 1978), British political strategist, author, and activist
- Imran Muhammad Akhoond (born 1971), Pakistani guitarist and session musician
- Imran Akram, Pakistani politician
- Imran Ali, multiple people
- Imran Amed (born 1975), Canadian-British fashion entrepreneur
- Imran Reza Ansari (born 1972), Indian politician, businessman, and Islamic scholar
- Imran Al Aradi, Pakistani-Bahraini stand up comedian and disc jockey
- Imran Arif (born 1984), Pakistani-English cricketer
- Imran Ashraf (born 1989), Pakistani actor, screenwriter, and host
- Imran Ashraf (cricketer) (born 1980), Pakistani-Qatari cricketer
- Imran Aslam (actor) (born 1986), Pakistani television actor
- Imran Aslam (journalist) (1952–2022), Pakistani journalist and media personality
- Imran Awan (born 1979), Pakistani-American information technology worker
- Imran Awan (cricketer) (born 1979), Pakistani-American cricketer
- Imran Aznaurov (born 2004), Russian footballer
- Imran Bisthamin (born 1985), Sri Lankan rugby union footballer
- Imran Brohi (born 1963), Pakistani cricketer
- Imran Bunjaku (born 1992), Swiss-Kosovar footballer
- Imran Butt (cricketer) (born 1995), Pakistani cricketer
- Imran Butt (field hockey) (born 1988), Pakistani field hockey player
- Imran Khalid Butt (born 1977), Pakistani politician
- Imran Chaudhri (born 1973), British designer
- Imran Ilyas Chaudhry, Pakistani politician
- Imran Farhat (born 1982), Pakistani cricketer
- Imran Farooq (1960–2010), British-Pakistani politician
- Imran Fetai (born 2002), Macedonian footballer
- Imran Firasat (born 1978), Pakistani filmmaker
- Imran Firov (born 2008), Russian footballer
- Imran Garda (born 1982), Qatari news anchor
- Imran Ghulam (born 1980), Bahraini cricketer
- Imran Haider (born 1987), Pakistani-Emirati cricketer
- Imran Hashmi (footballer) (born 1989), Pakistani footballer
- Imran Hasnee (born 1972), Indian actor and paranormal investigator
- Imran N. Hosein (born 1942), Trinidadian Islamic preacher, author, and philosopher
- Imran ibn Husain (died 673), Arab companion of Muhammad
- Imran Hussain (British politician) (born 1978), British politician
- Imran Hussain (footballer) (born 1981), Pakistani footballer
- Imran Hussain (Indian politician) (born 1981), Indian politician
- Imran Ismail (born 1966), Pakistani businessman and politician
- Imran Jafferally (born 1980), Guyanese cricketer
- Imran Jan (born 1979), Trinidadian cricketer
- Imran Janat, Afghan cricketer
- Imran Javed, Pakistani politician
- Imran Junaidi (died 2015), Pakistani rock climber and mountaineer
- Imran Kayani (born 2001), British-Pakistani footballer
- Imran Khalid (born 1982), Pakistani cricketer
- Imran Khan (born 1952), Pakistani cricketer and politician
- Imran Khan (Afghan cricketer) (born 2001), Afghan cricketer
- Imran Khan (businessman) (born 1977), Bangladeshi technology executive, entrepreneur, and investor
- Imran Khan (cricketer, born 1963) (born 1963), Pakistani cricketer
- Imran Khan (cricketer, born September 1973) (born 1973), Pakistani cricketer
- Imran Khan (cricketer, born 1975) (born 1975), Pakistani cricketer
- Imran Khan (cricketer, born 1987) (born 1987), Pakistani cricketer
- Imran Khan (cricketer, born 1988) (born 1988), Pakistani cricketer
- Imran Khan (film actor) (born 1983), American actor
- Imran Khan (footballer) (born 1995), Indian footballer
- Imran Khan (Guyanese cricketer) (born 1982), Guyanese cricketer
- Imran Khan (Indian cricketer) (born 1973), Indian cricketer
- Imran Khan (kickboxer), British-Pakistani Muay Thai kickboxer
- Imran Khan (singer) (born 1984), Dutch-Pakistani singer
- Imran Khan (solicitor) (born 1964), British-Pakistani solicitor
- Imran Khan (Sri Lankan cricketer) (born 1992), Sri Lankan cricketer
- Imran Khan (Trinidad and Tobago cricketer) (born 1984), Trinidadian cricketer
- Imran Khan (TV actor), Indian actor, director, writer, and producer
- Imran Khan (web developer) (born 1978), Indian teacher and educator
- Imran Ahmad Khan (born 1973), British politician
- Imran Hassan Khan (born 1983), Indian shooter
- Imran Nazir Khan, Indian actor
- Imran Riaz Khan (born 1975), Pakistani journalist and internet personality
- Imran Ullah Khan (1932–2026), Pakistani Army general
- Imran Khand (1964–2016), British businessman
- Imran Khattak, Pakistani politician
- Imran Khedawala, Indian politician
- Imran Khwaja, Singaporean cricket administrator and lawyer
- Imran Kombe (died 1996), Tanzanian military and intelligence officer
- Imran Zafar Leghari (born 1979), Pakistani politician
- Imran Maharoof (born 1983), Sri Lankan politician
- Imran Mahmood (born 1969), British novelist and barrister
- Imran Mahmudul (born 1991), Bangladeshi music composer and playback singer
- Imran Majeed (born 1958), Pakistani Army general
- Imran Majid (born 1972), English pool player
- Imran Manack (born 1991), South African cricketer
- Imran Masood (born 1971), Indian politician
- Imran Masood (Pakistani politician), Pakistani politician
- Imran Mayo, Pakistani field hockey player
- Imran Memet (born 2005), Chinese footballer
- Imran Mir (born 2001), Afghan cricketer
- Imran Mohamed (born 1980), Maldivian footballer
- Imran Mohammadi (born 2001), Afghan cricketer
- Imran Khan Mohmand (died 2013), Pakistani politician
- Imran Nackerdien (born 1990), South African cricketer
- Imran Nadeem, Pakistani politician
- Imran Nahumarury (born 1978), Indonesian footballer
- Imran Nasheed (born 1988), Maldivian footballer
- Imran Nazih (born 2006), Dutch-Moroccan footballer
- Imran Nazir (cricketer) (born 1981), Pakistani cricketer
- Imran Nazir (writer), Pakistani writer
- Imran Niazi (born 1986), Pakistani footballer
- Imran Nshimiyimana (born 1994), Rwandan footballer
- Imran Ahsan Khan Nyazee (born 1945), Pakistani legal scholar
- Imran Oulad Omar (born 1997), Dutch footballer
- Imran Özkaya (born 1999), German taekwondo athlete
- Imran Parvez (born 1977), Bangladeshi cricketer
- Imran Polutak (born 1996), Bosnian basketball player
- Imran Pratapgarhi (born 1987), Indian poet and politician
- Imran Qayyum (born 1993), English cricketer
- Imran Qurban (born 1999), Chinese footballer
- Imran Rafiq (born 1996), Pakistani cricketer
- Imran Rahim (born 1983), Bangladeshi cricketer
- Imran Rahman (born 1957), Bangladeshi academic
- Imranur Rahman (born 1993), British-Bangladeshi sprinter
- Imran Rasul (born 1974), British-Pakistani economist and academic
- Imran Sahib (born 1982), Singaporean footballer
- Imran Sardhariya (born 1979), Indian choreographer and film director
- Imran H Sarkar (born 1983), Bangladeshi physician and political activist
- Imran Sarker, Bangladeshi cricketer
- Imran Shah (field hockey) (born 1988), Pakistani field hockey player
- Imran Shah (writer) (born 1933), Indian writer, poet, novelist, and scholar
- Imran Ali Shah, Pakistani politician
- Imran Sheikh (born 1985), Indian cricketer
- Imran Sherwani (1962–2025), English field hockey player
- Imran Siddiqi (born 1957), Indian geneticist
- Imran Siddique, Bangladeshi lawyer
- Imran Tahir (born 1979), Pakistani-born South African cricketer
- Imran Usmanov (1953–2017), Russian musician
- Imran Uzzaman (born 1994), Bangladeshi cricketer
- Imran Yousuf (born 1978), Pakistani field hockey player
- Imran Yusuf (born 1979), Kenyan-British stand-up comedian
- Imran Zahid (born 1982), Indian actor

== Surname ==
- Muhammad Imran (field hockey) (born 1979), Pakistani hockey player
- Tariq Imran (born 1977), Pakistani field hockey player
- Tushar Imran (born 1983), Bangladeshi cricketer

== Fictional characters ==
- Ali Imran, the protagonist of the Imran series
- Imran Habeeb, in British soap opera Coronation Street
- Imran Zakhaev, the main antagonist of the game Call of Duty 4: Modern Warfare
- Imran Maalik, in British soap opera Hollyoaks
- Imran Shinowa, minor character in GTA V.

== See also ==
- Imran (disambiguation)
- Imrani (1454–1536), Persian poet
- Omran (disambiguation)
