= Imran Khan (disambiguation) =

Imran Khan (born 1952) is a Pakistani former cricketer and politician who was the 22nd prime minister of Pakistan.

Imran Khan or Imraan Khan may also refer to:

== Cricketers ==
- Imraan Khan (born 1984), South African Test cricketer
- Imraan Khan (cricketer, born January 1984), South African cricketer for North West
- Imran Khan (cricketer, born 1963), Pakistani cricketer for Quetta
- Imran Khan (cricketer, born September 1973), Pakistani cricketer for Agriculture Development Bank of Pakistan
- Imran Khan (cricketer, born 1975), Pakistani cricketer for Karachi Blues, Karachi Whites, Public Works Department, and Hyderabad
- Imran Khan (cricketer, born 1987), Pakistani Test cricketer
- Imran Khan (cricketer, born 1988), Pakistani cricketer for Peshawar Panthers
- Imran Khan (Afghan cricketer) (born 2001)
- Imran Khan (Guyanese cricketer) (born 1982)
- Imran Khan (Indian cricketer) (born 1973)
- Imran Khan (Sri Lankan cricketer) (born 1992)
- Imran Khan (Trinidad and Tobago cricketer) (born 1984)

== Other sports people ==
- Imran Hassan Khan (born 1983), Indian sport shooter
- Imran Khan (footballer) (born 1995), Indian football midfielder
- Imran Khan (kickboxer), British Muay Thai kickboxer

== Entertainers ==
- Imran Khan (film actor) (born 1983), Bollywood actor
- Imran Khan (singer) (born 1984), Dutch singer of Pakistani descent
- Imran Mashkoor Khan, Indian television actor; see Miilee
- Imran Nazir Khan, Indian television actor
- Imran "Hanzi" Khan, Howard Stern Show Wack Packer
- Imran Khan (TV actor), Indian actor, director, writer and producer
- Imran Khan Pratapgarhi or Imran Pratapgarhi (born 1987), Indian Urdu poet

== Others ==
- Imran Ahmad Khan (born 1973), British politician and convicted sex offender
- Imran Ahsan Khan Nyazee (born 1945), Pakistani legal scholar
- Imran Khan (web developer) (born 1978), Indian web developer; mentioned in a speech by Indian Prime Minister Narendra Modi
- Imran Khand (1964–2016), British businessman, co-founder and CEO of Picsel
- Imran Khan (lawyer) (born 1964), lawyer who acted for Stephen Lawrence's family
- Imran Khan (businessman) (born 1977), chief strategy officer of Snap Inc., technology executive, entrepreneur and investor
- Imran Riaz Khan (born 1975), Pakistani journalist
- Imran Ullah Khan (1932–2026), Pakistani Army general
