= Umran =

Umran is a masculine given name and surname of Arabic origin. It means prosperity and esteem, and can also refer to civilization, fertility and growth. Another spelling of the name is Omran. Notable people with the name include:

== Given name ==
=== Umran ===
- Umran Inan (born 1950), Turkish scientist
- Umran Javed (born 1979), British-Pakistani terrorist
- Umran Malik (born 1999), Indian cricketer

=== Ümran ===
- Ümran Ertiş (born 1996), Turkish female Paralympian table tennis player
- Ümran Özev (born 1995), Turkish women's footballer
- Ümran Zambak (born 2000), Dutch-Turkish footballer

== Surname ==
- Muhammad Umran (1922–1972), former Syrian defense minister

== Places ==
- Bin ʽUmran, village in Oman
- Haji Omeran, town in Iraqi Kurdistan
- Umran, Raebareli, village in India

== Publications ==
- Umran, Turkish magazine
- Umran Dergisi, Turkish magazine

== See also ==
- Imran (disambiguation)
