= Al-Hidayah =

12th-century Hanafi legal manual

Al-Hidayah fi Sharh Bidayat al-Mubtadi, commonly referred to as Al-Hidayah, (Note: Arabic: الهداية في شرح بداية المبتدي. English transliteration: al-Hidāyah fī Sharḥ Bidāyat al-Mubtadī, literally meaning "The Guidance in Explaining the Beginner's Primer.") is a 12th-century legal manual by Burhan al-Din al-Marghinani, which is considered to be one of the most influential compendium of Hanafi jurisprudence (fiqh). It has been subject of numerous commentaries.

== History and significance ==
The author, Shaykh al-Islam Burhan al-Din al-Farghani al-Marghinani (d.593AH/1197CE), was considered to be one of the most esteemed jurists of the Hanafite school. Al-Hidayah is a concise commentary on al-Marghinani's own compendium al-Bidayat al-mubtadi, which was in turn based on Mukhtasar by al-Quduri and al-Shaybani's al-Jami‘ al-saghir. The significance of al-Hidayah in the Hanafite school lay not in its intrinsic virtues, but in its role as an authoritative and convenient basis for further commentaries. Thus, it constituted not a statement of the law in itself, but rather an interpretative framework for elaboration of jurisprudence in different times and places.

During the era of British colonial rule in South Asia, al-Hidayah alongside Fatawa-i-Alamgiri played a central role in the development of the amalgam of Islamic and British law known as Anglo-Muhammadan law which continues to be the basis of Islamic personal laws in India, Pakistan & Bangladesh. Since the Hanafite school was predominant on the Indian sub-continent, the book was influential there as a substrate for commentaries, and — supplemented by professorial exposition — as a textbook for law colleges (madrasas). In the late 18th century, William Jones commissioned its translation into Persian, and this version was used by Charles Hamilton to produce an English translation. The translation enabled British colonial judges to adjudicate in the name of sharia, which amounted to an unprecedented codification of Hanafi law, severed from its Arabic-language interpretative tradition. This served to accomplish two goals, which had been long pursued by the British in India: firstly, it limited the judicial discretion of the qadis and the influence of muftis in the sharia system, reducing their earlier role as "middlemen" between the Islamic legal tradition and the colonial administration; and, secondly, it replaced the interpretative mechanisms of fiqh by those of English common law.

== Translations ==
=== Persian ===
Al-Hidaya was translated into Persian in 1776 by a group of Muslim scholars in Bengal, India. The translation was commissioned by Charles Hamilton, which he used to translate it later into English. The Persian translation was re-published twice in India, once in Calcutta and later in 1874 in Lucknow.

=== English ===
- Charles Hamilton's 1791 translation into English, which was made from a Persian translation rather than from the original Arabic text.
- A new English translation of the original Arabic text by Dr Imran Ahsan Khan Nyazee, translated from its original Arabic text with introduction, commentary and notes was published in 2006, focusing on the ritual and family law sections which amounted to about 40% of the original work. A further two volumes were published by the same translator in 2016 and 2023 respectively, translating the rest of the Arabic text that was excluded in the first volume.

=== Urdu ===
- 1896 - Translation and commentary by Maulana Sayyid Amir Ali, entitled Ainul-Hidayah and published in Lucknow. An edited and expanded edition was produced by Maulana Anwarul-Haq Qasmi, published in 2003 as Ainul-Hidayah Jadid.
- 1984 - Translation and commentary by Maulana Jamil Ahmad Qasmi Sakrodhawi, entitled Ashraful-Hidayah.
- 2004 - Translation and commentary by Maulana Abdul-Halim Qasmi Bastawi, entitled Ahsanul-Hidayah.
- 2008 - Translation and commentary by Sameeruddin Qasmi, entitled Asmarul-Hidayah.

=== Turkish ===
- 1982 - Hasan Ege
- 1990 - Ahmet Meylani
- 2014 - Hüsamettin Vanlıoğlu, Abdullah Hiçdönmez, Fatih Kalender, and Emin Ali Yüksel.
