= Haplogroup J-M267 =

Human Y-chromosome DNA haplogroup

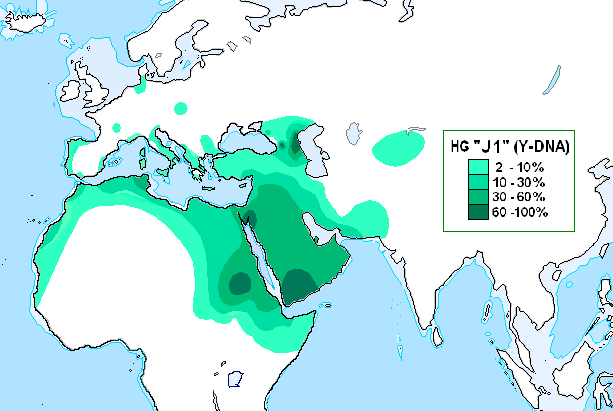
- Interpolated geographical frequency distribution.
- Possible time of origin: 17,000–24,000 years before present (Di Giacomo 2004), 30,700 years BP
- Possible place of origin: Somewhere between northwestern Iran, the Caucasus and the Armenian Highland
- Ancestor: J-P209
- Descendants: J-M62, J-M365.1, J-L136, J-Z1828
- Defining mutations: M267, L255, L321, L765, L814, L827, L1030

Haplogroup J-M267, also commonly known as Haplogroup J1, is a subclade (branch) of Y-DNA haplogroup J-P209 (commonly known as haplogroup J) along with its sibling clade haplogroup J-M172 (commonly known as haplogroup J2). (All these haplogroups have had other historical names listed below. (Note: This table shows the historic names for J-M267 and its earlier discovered and named subclade J-M62 in published peer reviewed literature.: YCC 2002/2008 (Shorthand) / J-M267 / J-M62; Jobling and Tyler-Smith 2000 / - / 9; Underhill 2000 / - / VI; Hammer 2001 / - / Med; Karafet 2001 / - / 23; Semino 2000 / - / Eu10; Su 1999 / - / H4; Capelli 2001 / - / B; YCC 2002 (Longhand) / - / J1; YCC 2005 (Longhand) / J1 / J1a; YCC 2008 (Longhand) / J1 / J1a; YCC 2010r (Longhand) / J1 / J1a) (Note: This table shows the historic names for J-P209 (AKA J-12f2.1 or J-M304) in published peer reviewed literature. Note that in Semino 2000 Eu09 is a subclade of Eu10 and in Karafet 2001 24 is a subclade of 23.: YCC 2002/2008 (Shorthand) / J-P209 (AKA J-12f2.1 or J-M304); Jobling and Tyler-Smith 2000 / 9; Underhill 2000 / VI; Hammer 2001 / Med; Karafet 2001 / 23; Semino 2000 / Eu10; Su 1999 / H4; Capelli 2001 / B; YCC 2002 (Longhand) / J*; YCC 2005 (Longhand) / J; YCC 2008 (Longhand) / J; YCC 2010r (Longhand) / J))

The oldest J-M267 positive remains found so far are from a Caucasus Hunter-Gatherer from Satsurblia cave, Georgia.

Men from this lineage share a common paternal ancestor, which is demonstrated and defined by the presence of the single nucleotide polymorphism (SNP) mutation referred to as M267, which was announced in (Cinnioğlu 2004). This haplogroup is found today in significant frequencies in many areas in or near the Arabian Peninsula and Western Asia. Out of its native Asian Continent, it is found at very high frequencies in Sudan. It is also found at very high but lesser extent in parts of the Caucasus, Ethiopia and parts of North Africa and amongst most Levant peoples, including Jewish groups, especially those with Cohen surnames. It can also be found much less commonly, but still occasionally in significant amounts, in parts of southern Europe and as far east as Central Asia.

== Origins ==
Since the discovery of haplogroup J-P209 it has generally been recognized that it shows signs of having evolved ~ 20,000 years ago somewhere in northwestern Iran, the Caucasus, the Armenian Highlands, and northern Mesopotamia. The frequency and diversity of both its major branches, J-M267 and J-M172, in that region makes them candidates as genetic markers of the spread of farming technology during the Neolithic, which is proposed to have had a major impact upon human populations.

J-M267 has several recognized subclades, some of which were recognized before J-M267 itself was recognized, for example J-M62 Y Chromosome Consortium "YCC" 2002. With one notable exception, J-P58, most of these are not common (Tofanelli 2009). Because of the dominance of J-P58 in J-M267 populations in many areas, discussion of J-M267's origins require a discussion of J-P58 at the same time.

Haplogroup J-P58 is strongly associated with ancient populations from the Caucasus and ancient Iran. Current DNA research indicates that this haplogroup was absent in all Natufian and Neolithic Levant male individuals examined thus far, but emerged during the Bronze Age in Lebanon and Jordan along with ancestry related to Chalcolithic Iranians. This ancestry penetrated the Levant between 3,300 and 5,900 YBP and Arabia between 2,000 and 3,500 YBP. These times overlap with the dates for the Bronze Age origin and spread of Semitic languages in the Middle East estimated from lexical data.

== Distribution ==
=== Africa ===
==== North Africa and Horn of Africa ====
North Africa received Semitic-language speaking migrations, according to some studies it may have been diffused in recent time by Arabs who, mainly from the 7th century A.D., expanded to northern Africa (Arredi 2004 and Semino 2004). However the Canary Islands is not known to have had any Semitic language. In North Africa J-M267 is dominated by J-P58, and dispersed in a very uneven manner according to studies so far, often but not always being lower among Berber and/or non-urban populations. In Ethiopia there are signs of older movements of J-M267 into Africa across the Red Sea, not only in the J-P58 form. This also appears to be associated with Semitic languages. According to a study in 2011, in Tunisia, J-M267 is significantly more abundant in the urban (31.3%) than in the rural total population (2.5%) (Ennafaa 2011).

Population	Sample size	J*(xJ-M172)	total J-M267	J-M267(xP58)	J-P58	publication	previous research on same samples
Algeria (Arabs from Oran)	102	NA	22.5%	NA	NA	Robino 2007	
Algeria	20	NA	35%	NA	NA	Semino 2004	
Egypt	147	NA	21.1%	1.4%	19.7%	Chiaroni 2009	Luis 2004
Egypt	124	NA	19.8%	NA	NA	El-Sibai 2009	
Egypt (Siwa, Western Desert)	35	NA	31.4%	NA	NA	Kujanová 2009	
Libya (Tuareg)	47	NA	0%	NA	NA	Ottoni 2011	
Libya (Benghazi)	238	NA	39.5%	NA	NA	Alvarez 2014	Elmrghni 2012
Morocco (Arabs)	87	NA	26.4%	NA	NA	Fadhlaoui-Zid 2013	
Morocco (Arabs)	49	NA	20.4%	NA	NA	Semino 2004	
Morocco (Arabs)	28	NA	60.7%	NA	NA	Underhill 2000	
Morocco (Arabs)	19	NA	31.5%	NA	NA	Francalacci 2008	
Morocco (Berbers)	64	NA	6.3%	NA	NA	Semino 2004	
Morocco (Berbers)	103	NA	10.7%	NA	NA	Semino 2004	
Morocco (Rabat)	267	NA	21.3%	NA	NA	Alvarez 2014	Aboukhalid 2010
Morocco (Casablanca)	166	NA	15.7%	NA	NA	Alvarez 2014	Laouina 2011
Morocco (Figuig)	96	NA	29.2%	NA	NA	Alvarez 2014	Palet 2010
Morocco (El Jadida)	49	NA	8.2%	NA	NA	Alvarez 2014	
Morocco (Fes)	108	NA	16.7%	0.0%	16.7%	Regueiro 2015	
Tunisia	73	NA	34.2%	NA	NA	Semino 2004	
Tunisia	601	Na	16.64%	NA	NA	Pestano J, et al. (2013)	
Tunisia (Sousse)	220	NA	25.9%	0.0%	25.9%	Fadhlaoui-Zid 2015	
Tunisia (Tunis)	148	NA	32.4%	1.3%	31.1%	Grugni 2012	Arredi 2004
Tunisia	52	NA	34.6%	NA	NA	Onofri 2008	
Tunisia (Bou Omran Berbers)	40	NA	0%	NA	NA	Ennafaa 2011	
Tunisia (Bou Saad Berbers)	40	NA	5%	0%	5%	Ennafaa 2011	
Tunisia (Jerbian Arabs)	46	NA	8.7%	NA	NA	Ennafaa 2011	
Tunisia (Jerbian Berbers)	47	NA	0%	NA	NA	Ennafaa 2011	
Tunisia (Sened Berbers)	35	NA	31.4%	0%	31.4%	Fadhlaoui-Zid 2011	
Tunisia (Andalusi Zaghouan)	32	NA	43.8%	0%	43.8%	Fadhlaoui-Zid 2011	
Tunisia (Cosmopolitan Tunis)	33	NA	24.2	0%	24.2%	Fadhlaoui-Zid 2011	
Tunisia (Sejenane)	47	NA	34.0%	NA	NA	Alvarez 2014	Frigi 2011
Tunisia (Sfax)	56	NA	25%	0.0%	25%	Regueiro 2015	
Tunisia (Beja)	72	NA	15.3%	0.0%	15.3%	Regueiro 2015	
Canary Islands (pre-Hispanic)	30	NA	16.7%	NA	NA	Fregel 2009	
Canary Islands (17th-18th c)	42	NA	11.9%	NA	NA	Fregel 2009	
Canary Islands	652	NA	3.5%	NA	NA	Fregel 2009	
Sahrawis	89	NA	20.2%	NA	NA	Fregel 2009	Bosch 2001 and Flores 2001
Sudan (Khartoum)	35	NA	74.3%	0.0%	74.3%	Chiaroni 2009	Tofanelli 2009 and Hassan 2008
Sudan (Sudanese Arabs)	35	NA	17.1%	0.0%	17.1%	Chiaroni 2009	Hassan 2008
Sudan (Nilo-Saharans)	61	NA	4.9%	3.3%	1.6%	Chiaroni 2009	Hassan 2008
Ethiopia (Oromo)	78	NA	2.6%	2.6%	0.0%	Chiaroni 2009	Semino 2004
Ethiopia (Amhara)	48	NA	29.2%	8.3%	20.8%	Chiaroni 2009	Semino 2004
Ethiopia (Arsi)	85	22%	NA	NA	NA	Moran 2004	
Ethiopia	95	21%	NA	NA	NA	Moran 2004	
Somalis	201	0.5%	2.5%	NA	2.5%	Sanchez 2005	J-P58 might be 5% in upcoming study
Comoros	293	NA	5.0%	NA	NA	Msaidie 2011	
South Africa (Lemba)	76	NA	39.5%	26.3%	13.2%	Soodyall 2011	
Zimbabwe (Lemba)	54	NA	9.3%	9.3%	NA	Soodyall 2011	

=== Asia ===
==== South Asia ====
J*(xJ-M172) was found in India among Indian Muslims.

Population	Sample size	J*(xJ-M172)	total J-M267	J-M267(xP58)	J-P58	Publication
India (Shia)	161	10.6%	NA	NA	NA	Eaaswarkhanth 2009
India (Sunni)	129	2.3%	NA	NA	NA	Eaaswarkhanth 2009
India (Mappla)	40	10%	NA	NA	NA	Eaaswarkhanth 2009

==== West Asia ====
The area including eastern Turkey and the Zagros and Taurus mountains, has been identified as a likely area of ancient J-M267 diversity. Both J-P58 and other types of J-M267 are present, sometimes with similar frequencies.

Population	Sample size	Total J-M267	J-M267(xP58)	J-P58	Publication	Previous research on same samples
Turkey	523	9.0%	3.1%	5.9%	Chiaroni 2009	Cinnioğlu 2004
Iran	150	11.3%	2.7%	8.7%	Chiaroni 2009	Regueiro 2006
Iran (Khuzestan)	NA	33.4%	NA	NA	Kivisild 2012	
Iraq (Kurds)	93	11.8%	4.3%	7.5%	Chiaroni 2009	
Iraq (Assyrians)	28	28.6%	17.9%	10.7%	Chiaroni 2009	
Iraq (Arabs)	56	64.1%	1.8%	62.3%	Chiaroni 2009	Tofanelli 2009
Iran (Assyrians)	31	16.1%	9.7%	6.5%	Chiaroni 2009	
Iran	92	3.2%	NA	NA	El-Sibai 2009	
Turkey (Assyrians)	25	20.0%	16.0%	4.0%	Chiaroni 2009	

==== Levantine populations ====
J-M267 is very common throughout this region, dominated by J-P58, but some specific sub-populations have notably low frequencies.

Population	Sample size	Total J-M267	J-M267(xP58)	J-P58	Publication	Previous research on same samples
Syria	554	33.6%	NA	NA	El-Sibai 2009	Zalloua 2008a
Syria (Jabel Druze)	34	14.7%	2.9%	11.8%	Chiaroni 2009	
Syria (Hama Sunnis)	36	47.2%	2.8%	44.4%	Chiaroni 2009	
Syria (Ma'loula Aramaeans)	44	6.8%	4.5%	2.3%	Chiaroni 2009	
Syria (Sednaya Syriac Catholic)	14	14.3%	0.0%	14.3%	Chiaroni 2009	
Syria (Damascus Syriac Catholic)	42	9.5%	0.0%	9.5%	Chiaroni 2009	
Syria (Alawites)	45	26.7%	0.0%	26.7%	Chiaroni 2009	
Syria (North-east Assyrians)	30	3.3%	0.0%	3.3%	Chiaroni 2009	
Syria (Damascus Ismailis)	51	58.8%	0.0%	58.8%	Chiaroni 2009	
Lebanon	951	25%	NA	NA	Zalloua 2008a	
Galilee Druze	172	13.4%	1.2%	12.2%	Chiaroni 2009	Shlush 2008
Arabs in Israel (Akka)	101	39.2%	NA	NA	Zalloua 2008b	
Arabs in Israel	49	32.7%	0.0%	32.7%	Chiaroni 2009	
Jordan	76	48.7%	0.0%	48.7%	Chiaroni 2009	
Jordan	273	35.5%	NA	NA	El-Sibai 2009	
Jordan (Amman)	101	40.6%	NA	NA	Flores 2005	
Jordan (Dead Sea)	45	8.9%	NA	NA	Flores 2005	
Jews (Trás-os-Montes, Portugal)	57	12.3%	NA	NA	Nogueiro 2009	
Jews (Cohanim)	215	46.0%	0.0%	46.0%	Hammer 2009	
Jews (non-Cohanim Ashkenazi)	1,360	14.9%	0.9%	14.0%	Hammer 2009	
Bedouin (Negev)	28	67.9%	3.6%	64.3%	Chiaroni 2009	Cann 2002

==== Arabian peninsula ====
J-P58 is the most common Y-Chromosome haplogroup among men from all of this region.

Population	Sample size	Total J-M267	J-M267(xP58)	J-P58	Publication	Previous research on same samples
Saudi Arabia	157	40.1%	NA	NA	Abu-Amero 2009	
Qatar	72	58.3%	1.4%	56.9%	Chiaroni 2009	Cadenas 2008
United Arab Emirates	164	34.8%	0.0%	34.8%	Chiaroni 2009	Cadenas 2008
Yemen	62	72.6%	4.8%	67.7%	Chiaroni 2009	Cadenas 2008
Kuwait	117	45.2%	NA	NA		
Oman	121	38.0%	0.8%	37.2%	Chiaroni 2009	Luis 2004

=== Europe ===
J-M267 is uncommon in most of Northern and Central Europe. It is, however, found in significant pockets at levels of 5–10% among many populations in southern Europe. A 2018 genetic study (Finocchio et al. 2018) with the extant variation strongly suggests the Caucasus and regions North of it as likely to be an origin of the Greek and Italian J-M267 haplogroup.

Population	Sample size	Total J-M267	J-M267(xP58)	J-P58	publication
Albania	56	3.6%	NA	NA	Semino 2004
North Macedonia (Albanian speakers)	64	6.3%	NA	NA	Battaglia 2008
Malta	90	7.8%	NA	NA	El-Sibai 2009
Greece (Crete)	193	8.3%	NA	NA	King 2008
Greece (mainland)	171	4.7%	NA	NA	King 2008
Greece (Macedonia)	56	1.8%	NA	NA	Semino 2004
Greece	249	1.6%	NA	NA	Di Giacomo 2004
Bulgaria	808	3.4%	NA	NA	Karachanak 2013
Romania	130	1.5%	NA	NA	Di Giacomo 2004
Russia	223	0.4%	NA	NA	Di Giacomo 2004
Croatia (Osijek Croats)	29	0%	NA	NA	Battaglia 2008
Slovenia	75	1.3%	NA	NA	Battaglia 2008
Italy (northeast Italians)	67	0%	NA	NA	Battaglia 2008
Italy (Italians)	915	0.7%	NA	NA	Capelli 2009
Italy (Sicily)	236	3.8%	NA	NA	Di Gaetano 2008
France (Provence)	51	2%	NA	NA	King 2011
Portugal (North)	101	1%	NA	NA	Gonçalves 2005
Portugal (Centre)	102	4.9%	NA	NA	Gonçalves 2005
Portugal (South)	100	7%	NA	NA	Gonçalves 2005
Portugal (Açores)	121	2.5%	NA	NA	Gonçalves 2005
Portugal (Madeira)	129	0%	NA	NA	Gonçalves 2005

==== Caucasus ====
The Caucasus has areas of both high and low J-M267 frequency. The J-M267 in the Caucasus is also notable because most of it is not within the J-P58 subclade.

Population	Sample size	Total J-M267	J-M267(xP58)	J-P58	Publication
Avars	115	59%	58%	1%	Balanovsky 2011
Dargins	101	70%	69%	1%	Balanovsky 2011
Kubachi	65	99%	99%	0%	Balanovsky 2011
Kaitak	33	85%	85%	0%	Balanovsky 2011
Lezghins	81	44.4%	44.4%	0%	Balanovsky 2011
Shapsug	100	0%	0%	0%	Balanovsky 2011
Abkhaz	58	0%	0%	0%	Balanovsky 2011
Circassians	142	11.9%	4.9%	7%	Balanovsky 2011
Ingush	143	2.8%	2.8%	0%	Balanovsky 2011
Ossetians	357	1.3%	1.3%	0.0%	Balanovsky 2011
Chechens (Ingushetia)	112	21%	21%	0%	Balanovsky 2011
Chechens (Chechnya)	118	25%	25%	0%	Balanovsky 2011
Chechens (Dagestan)	100	16%	16%	0%	Balanovsky 2011
Azerbaijan	46	15.2%	NA	NA	Di Giacomo 2004

=== Subclade Distribution ===
==== J-P58 ====
The P58 marker which defines subgroup J1c3 was announced in (Karafet 2008), but had been announced earlier under the name Page08 in (Repping 2006 and called that again in Chiaroni 2009). It is very prevalent in many areas where J-M267 is common, especially in parts of North Africa and throughout the Arabian peninsula. It also makes up approximately 70% of the J-M267 among the Amhara of Ethiopia. Notably, it is not common among the J-M267 of the Caucasus.

Chiaroni 2009 proposed that J-P58 (that they refer to as J1e) might have first dispersed during the Pre-Pottery Neolithic B period, "from a geographical zone, including northeast Syria, northern Iraq and eastern Turkey toward Mediterranean Anatolia, Ismaili from southern Syria, Jordan, Palestine and northern Egypt." They further propose that the Zarzian material culture may be ancestral. They also propose that this movement of people may also be linked to the dispersal of Semitic languages by hunter-herders, who moved into arid areas during periods known to have had low rainfall. Thus, while other haplogroups including J-M267 moved out of the area with agriculturalists who followed the rainfall, populations carrying J-M267 remained with their flocks (King 2002 and Chiaroni 2008).

According to this scenario, after the initial neolithic expansion involving Semitic languages, which possibly reached as far as Yemen, a more recent dispersal occurred during the Chalcolithic or Early Bronze Age (approximately 3000–5000 BCE), and this involved the branch of Semitic which leads to the Arabic language. The authors propose that this involved a spread of some J-P58 from the direction of Syria towards Arab populations of the Arabian Peninsula and Negev.

On the other hand, the authors agree that later waves of dispersion in and around this area have also had complex effects upon the distributions of some types of J-P58 in some regions. They list three regions which are particularly important to their proposal:

1. The Levant (Syria, Jordan, Israel and Palestine). In this area, Chiaroni 2009 note a "patchy distribution of J1c3 or J-P58 frequency" which is difficult to interpret, and which "may reflect the complex demographic dynamics of religion and ethnicity in the region".
2. The Armenian Highlands, northern Iraq and western Iran. In this area, Chiaroni 2009 recognize signs that J-M267 might have an older presence, and on balance they accept the evidence but note that it could be in error.
3. The southern area of Oman, Yemen and Ethiopia. In this area, Chiaroni 2009 recognize similar signs, but reject it as possibly a result of "either sampling variability and/or demographic complexity associated with multiple founders and multiple migrations."

==== The "YCAII=22-22 and DYS388≥15" cluster ====
Studies show that J-P58 group is not only in itself very dominant in many areas where J-M267 or J1 are common, but it also contains a large cluster which had been recognized before the discovery of P58. It is still a subject of research though.

This relatively young cluster, compared to J-M267 overall, was identified by STR markers haplotypes - specifically YCAII as 22-22, and DYS388 having unusual repeat values of 15 or higher, instead of more typical 13 (Chiaroni 2009) This cluster was found to be relevant in some well-publicized studies of Jewish and Palestinian populations (Nebel 2000 and Hammer 2009). More generally, since then this cluster has been found to be frequent among men in the Middle East and North Africa, but less frequent in areas of Ethiopia and Europe where J-M267 is nevertheless common. The genetical pattern is therefore similar to the pattern of J-P58 generally, described above, and may be caused by the same movements/migration of people (Chiaroni 2009).

Tofanelli 2009 refers to this overall cluster with YCAII=22-22 and high DYS388 values as an "Arabic" as opposed to a "Eurasian" type of J-M267. This Arabic type includes Arabic speakers from Maghreb, Sudan, Iraq and Qatar, and it is a relatively homogeneous group, implying that it might have dispersed relatively recently compared to J-M267 generally. The more diverse "Eurasian" group includes Europeans, Kurds, Iranians and Ethiopians (despite Ethiopia being outside of Eurasia), and is much more diverse. The authors also say that "Omanis show a mix of Eurasian pool-like and typical Arabic haplotypes as expected, considering the role of corridor played at different times by the Gulf of Oman in the dispersal of Asian and East African genes." Chiaroni 2009 also noted the anomalously high apparent age of Omani J-M267 when looking more generally at J-P58 and J-M267 more generally.

This cluster in turn contains three well-known related sub-clusters. First, it contains the majority of the Jewish "Cohen modal haplotype", found among Jewish populations, but especially in men with surnames related to Cohen. It also contains the "Galilee modal haplotype" (GMH) and "Palestinian & Israeli Arab modal haplotype", both of which are associated with Palestinian/Israeli Arabs by Nebel 2000 and Hammer 2009. Nebel 2002 then pointed out that the GMH is also the most frequent type of J-P209 haplotype found in north-west Africans and Yemenis, so it is not restricted to Israel and Palestine. However, this particular variant "is absent" from two particular "non-Arab Middle Eastern populations", namely "Jews and Muslim Kurds" (even though both of these populations do have high levels of J-P209). Nebel 2002 noted not only the presence of the GMH in the Maghreb but also that J-M267 in this region had very little diversity. They concluded that J-M267 in this region is a result of two distinct migration events: "early Neolithic dispersion" and "expansions from the Arabian peninsula" during the 7th century. Semino 2004 later agreed that this seemed consistent with the evidence and generalized from this that distribution of the entire YCAII=22-22 cluster of J-M267 in the Arabic-speaking areas of the Middle East and North Africa might in fact mainly have an origin in historical times.

More recent studies have emphasized doubt that the Islamic expansions are old enough to completely explain the major patterns of J-M267 frequencies. Chiaroni 2009 rejected this for J-P58 as a whole, but accepted that "some of the populations with low diversity, such as Bedouins from Israel, Qatar, Sudan and UAE, are tightly clustered near high-frequency haplotypes suggesting founder effects with star burst expansion in the Arabian Desert". They did not comment on the Maghreb.

Tofanelli 2009 take a stronger position of rejecting any strong correlation between the Arab expansion and either the YCAII=22-22 STR-defined sub-cluster as discussed by Semino 2004 or the smaller "Galilee modal haplotype" as discussed by (Nebel 2002). They also estimate that the Cohen modal haplotype must be older than 4500 years old, and maybe as much as 8600 years old - well before the supposed origin of the Cohanim. Only the "Palestinian & Israeli Arab" modal had a strong correlation to an ethnic group, but it was also rare. In conclusion, the authors were negative about the usefulness of STR defined modals for any "forensic or genealogical purposes" because "they were found across ethnic groups with different cultural or geographic affiliation".

Hammer 2009 disagreed, at least concerning the Cohen modal haplotype. They said that it was necessary to look at a more detailed STR haplotype in order to define a new "Extended Cohen Modal Haplotype" which is extremely rare outside Jewish populations, and even within Jewish populations is mainly only found in Cohanim. They also said that by using more markers and a more restrictive definition, the estimated age of the Cohanim lineage is lower than the estimates of Tofanelli 2009, and it is consistent with a common ancestor at the approximate time of founding of the priesthood which is the source of Cohen surnames.

Tofanelli et al. 2014 responded by saying: "In conclusion, while the observed distribution of sub-clades of haplotypes at mitochondrial and Y chromosome non-recombinant genomes might be compatible with founder events in recent times at the origin of Jewish groups as Cohenite, Levite, Ashkenazite, the overall substantial polyphyletism as well as their systematic occurrence in non-Jewish groups highlights the lack of support for using them either as markers of Jewish ancestry or Biblical tales."

==== J-M368 ====
The correspondence between P58 and high DYS388 values, and YCAII=22-22 is not perfect. For example the J-M267 subclade of J-P58 defined by SNP M368 has DYS388=13 and YCAII=19-22, like other types of J-M267 outside the "Arabic" type of J-M267, and it is therefore believed to be a relatively old offshoot of J-P58, that did not take part in the most recent waves of J-M267 expansion in the Middle East (Chiaroni 2009). These DYS388=13 haplotypes are most common in the Caucasus and Anatolia, but also found in Ethiopia (Tofanelli 2009).

== Phylogenetics and distribution ==
There are several confirmed and proposed phylogenetic trees available for haplogroup J-M267. The following phylogeny or family tree of J-M267 haplogroup subclades is based on the ISOGG (2012) tree, which is in turn based upon the YCC 2008 tree and subsequent published research.

J1 (L255, L321, M267)

- J1* J1* clusters are found in the Armenian Highlands and parts of the Caucasus.
- J1a (M62) Found at very low frequency in Europe.
- J1b (M365.1) Found at low frequency in the Armenian Highlands, Iran, Qatar and parts of Europe.
- J1c (L136)
  - J1c* Found at low frequency in Europe.
  - J1c1 (M390)
  - J1c2 (P56) Found sporadically in Anatolia, East Africa, the Arabian Peninsula and Europe.
  - J1c3
    - J1c3* Found at low frequency in the Levant and the Arabian Peninsula.
    - J1c3a (M367.1, M368.1) Previously known as J1e1.
    - J1c3b (M369) Previously known as J1e2.
    - J1c3c (L92, L93) Found at low frequency in South Arabia.
    - J1c3d (L147.1) Accounts for the majority of J1, the predominant haplogroup in the Arabian peninsula.
      - J1c3d* Accounts for the majority of J1 in Yemen, Cohen Jews (both Rabbinical and Karaitic).
      - J1c3d1 (L174.1)
      - J1c3d2 (L222.2) Accounts for the majority of J1c3d in Saudi Arabia. An important element of J1c3d in North Africa.
        - J1c3d2*
          - J1c3d2a (L65.2/S159.2)

== Ancient DNA ==
Caucasian hunter-gatherer (12,000-11,000BC)

An ancient sample of J1 was found at Satsurblia Cave In Georgia circa 11,000 BC, specifically belonging to the rare J1-FT34521 subclade. The ancient individual from Satsurblia was male with black hair, brown eyes, and light skin.

Eastern European hunter-gatherer (8,000-5,000)

Haplogroup J1 was found among Eastern hunter-gatherers. J1 was found among several samples from Minino, Vologda Oblast, three samples from Yuzhnyy Oleni Ostrov, Republic of Karelia and two samples from Popovo, Arkhangelsk Oblast.

Anatolian Neolithic Farmers (6,000-5,000BC)

Haplogroup J1 was found among samples from Anatolian farmers. Two samples from Çatalhöyük belonged to haplogroup J1.

Tell Kurdu (5,661-5,630BC)

One out of 4 male individuals from Tell Kurdu who lived circa 5661-5630 BC, belonged to J1-L620.

Khvalynsk culture (5206-4935 BC)

An ancient sample of J1 was found among individuals from Khvalynsk culture.

Kura–Araxes culture (3,500-2200)

Haplogroup J1 was found among several samples from Kura-Araxes culture.

Arslantepe archaeological complex (3491-3122 BC)

One out of 18 male individuals from Arslantepe who lived c. 3491-3122 BC, belonged to haplogroup J1-Z1824.

Ancient city of Ebla (2565-1896 BC)

Three out of 6 individuals from Ebla who lived between 2565-1896 BC, belonged to J1-P58.

Amorite city-state (1930-1325 BC)

Five out 12 male individuals from Alalakh who lived between 1930-1325 BC, belonged to haplogroup J1-P58.

== See also ==
=== Genetics ===
- Genetic history of the Middle East
- Genetic history of Europe
- Conversion table for Y chromosome haplogroups
- Genetic Genealogy
- Haplogroup
- Haplotype
- Human Y-chromosome DNA haplogroup
- Molecular phylogenetics
- Paragroup
- Subclade
- Y-chromosomal Aaron
- Y-chromosome haplogroups in populations of the world
- Y-DNA haplogroups in populations of Europe
- Y-DNA haplogroups in populations of East and Southeast Asia
- Y-DNA haplogroups in populations of the Near East
- Y-DNA haplogroups in populations of North Africa
- Y-DNA haplogroups in populations of the Caucasus
- Y-DNA haplogroups by ethnic group

=== Y-DNA J Subclades ===
- J-P58
- J-P209
- J-M172
- J-M267

=== Y-DNA Backbone Tree ===
YCC 2002/2008 (Shorthand)	J-M267	J-M62
Jobling and Tyler-Smith 2000	-	9
Underhill 2000	-	VI
Hammer 2001	-	Med
Karafet 2001	-	23
Semino 2000	-	Eu10
Su 1999	-	H4
Capelli 2001	-	B
YCC 2002 (Longhand)	-	J1
YCC 2005 (Longhand)	J1	J1a
YCC 2008 (Longhand)	J1	J1a
YCC 2010r (Longhand)	J1	J1a

YCC 2002/2008 (Shorthand)	J-P209 (AKA J-12f2.1 or J-M304)
Jobling and Tyler-Smith 2000	9
Underhill 2000	VI
Hammer 2001	Med
Karafet 2001	23
Semino 2000	Eu10
Su 1999	H4
Capelli 2001	B
YCC 2002 (Longhand)	J*
YCC 2005 (Longhand)	J
YCC 2008 (Longhand)	J
YCC 2010r (Longhand)	J
