= Y-chromosomal Aaron =

Hypothesized last common ancestor of the Kohanim caste

Y-chromosomal Aaron is the hypothesized most recent common ancestor of the patrilineal Jewish priestly caste known as Kohanim (singular Kohen, also spelled Cohen). According to the traditional understanding of the Hebrew Bible, this ancestor was Aaron, the brother of Moses. Historical-critical reading of the biblical text suggests that the origin of the priesthood could have been much more complex, and that for much if not all of the First Temple period, Kohen may have not (necessarily) been synonymous with "Aaronide". Rather, this traditional identity seems to have been adopted sometime around the Second Temple period.

The original scientific research was based on the hypothesis that a majority of present-day Jewish Kohanim share a pattern of values for six Y-STR markers, which researchers named the extended Cohen Modal Haplotype (CMH). Subsequent research using twelve Y-STR markers indicated that nearly half of contemporary Jewish Kohanim shared Y-chromosomal J1 M267 (specifically haplogroup J-P58, also called J1c3), while other Kohanim share a different ancestry, such as haplogroup J2a (J-M410).

While these genetic studies were seen as possibly supporting the traditional biblical narrative, subsequent research (by the original researchers and others) has challenged this conclusion in a number of ways and has in fact shown that the genealogical record "refutes the idea of a single founder for Jewish Cohanim who lived in Biblical times", and rather "seems to vindicate the historical-critical hypothesis of competing priestly clans."

== Background ==
For human beings, the normal number of chromosomes is 46, of which 23 are inherited from each parent. Two chromosomes, the X and Y, determine sex. Females have two X chromosomes, one inherited from each of their parents. Males have an X chromosome inherited from their mother, and a Y chromosome inherited from their father.

Males who share a common patrilineal ancestor also share a common Y chromosome, diverging only with respect to accumulated mutations. Since Y-chromosomes are passed from father to son, all Kohanim men should theoretically have nearly identical Y chromosomes; this can be assessed with a genealogical DNA test. As the mutation rate on the Y chromosome is relatively constant, scientists can estimate the elapsed time since two men had a common ancestor.

Membership in the Jewish Kohanim caste has been determined by patrilineal descent (see Presumption of priestly descent), which would make it possible for the characteristic to be tracked using the Y chromosome passed on to each male descendant. Modern Kohanim are traditionally regarded in Judaism as male descendants of biblical Aaron, the inaugural List of high priests of Israel and brother of Moses. Aaron was a direct patrilineal descendant of Abraham, according to the lineage recorded in the Hebrew Bible (שמות / Sh'mot/Exodus 6).

With the development of methods to follow specific DNA sequences of the human genome, interest in the Cohanim (and Levites) has gained new momentum as an instrument for proof of the common origins of the current Jewish ethnic-groups in the population of the Land of Israel two thousand years ago, as narrated in the biblical story. Skorecki, who carried out the initial study, told the journalist Jon Entine, "I was interested in the question: To what extent was our shared oral tradition matched by other evidence?"

== Initial study ==
The Kohen hypothesis was first tested through DNA analysis in 1997 by Karl Skorecki and collaborators from Haifa, Israel. In their study, "Y chromosomes of Jewish priests", published in the journal Nature, they found that the Kohanim appeared to share a different probability distribution compared to the rest of the Jewish population for the two Y-chromosome markers they tested (YAP and DYS19). They also found that the probabilities appeared to be shared by both Sephardic and Ashkenazi Kohens, pointing to a common Kohen population origin before the Jewish diaspora at the destruction of the Second Temple. However, this study also indicated that only 48% of Ashkenazi Kohens and 58% of Sephardic Kohens have the J1 Cohen Modal Haplotype. Such genetic markers were also found in approximately 5% of Jews who did not believe themselves to be kohanim.

In a subsequent study the next year (Thomas MG et al., 1998), the team increased the number of Y-STR markers tested to six, as well as testing more SNP markers. Again, they found that a clear difference was observable between the Kohanim population and the general Jewish population, with many of the Kohen STR results clustered around a single pattern they named the Kohen Modal Haplotype:

	xDE	xDE,PR	Hg J	CMH.1	CMH	CMH.1/HgJ	CMH/HgJ
Ashkenazi Cohanim (AC):	98.5%	96%	87%	69%	45%	79%	52%
Sephardic Cohanim (SC):	100%	88%	75%	61%	56%	81%	75%
Ashkenazi Jews (AI):	82%	62%	37%	15%	13%	40%	35%
Sephardic Jews (SI):	85%	63%	37%	14%	10%	38%	27%

Here, becoming increasingly specific, xDE is the proportion who were not in Haplogroups D or E (from the original paper); xDE,PR is the proportion who were not in haplogroups D, E, P, Q or R; Hg J is the proportion who were in Haplogroup J (from the slightly larger panel studied by Behar et al. (2003)); CMH.1 means "within one marker of the CMH-6"; and CMH is the proportion with a 6/6 match. The final two columns show the conditional proportions for CMH.1 and CMH, given membership of Haplogroup J.

The data show that the Kohanim were more than twice as likely to belong to Haplogroup J than the average non-Cohen Jew. Of those who did belong to Haplogroup J, the Kohanim were more than twice as likely to have an STR pattern close to the CMH-6, suggesting a much more recent common ancestry for most of them compared to an average non-Kohen Jew of Haplogroup J.

=== Dating ===
Thomas, et al. dated the origin of the shared DNA to approximately 3,000 years ago (with variance arising from different generation lengths). The techniques used to find Y-chromosomal Aaron were first popularized in relation to the search for the patrilineal ancestor of all contemporary living humans, Y-chromosomal Adam.

Subsequent calculations under the coalescent model for J1 haplotypes bearing the Cohanim motif gave time estimates that place the origin of this genealogy around 6,200 years ago (95% CI: 4.5–8.6 Kybp), earlier than previously thought, and well before the origin of Judaism (David Kingdom, ~2.0 Kybp).

=== Responses ===
The finding led to excitement in religious circles, with some seeing it as providing some proof of the historical veracity of the priestly covenant or other religious convictions.

Following the discovery of the very high prevalence of 6/6 CMH matches amongst Kohanim, other researchers and analysts were quick to look for it. Some groups have taken the presence of this haplotype as indicating possible Jewish ancestry, although the chromosome is not exclusive to Jews. It is widely found among other Semitic peoples of the Middle East.

Early research suggested that the 6/6 matches found among male Lemba of Southern Africa confirmed their oral history of descent from Jews and connection to Jewish culture. Later research has been unable to confirm this (due to the fact that CMH was widely found among other Semitic peoples of the Middle East) although it has shown that some male Lemba have Middle Eastern ancestry.

Critics such as Avshalom Zoossmann-Diskin suggested that the paper's evidence was being overstated in terms of showing Jewish descent among these distant populations.

== Limitations ==
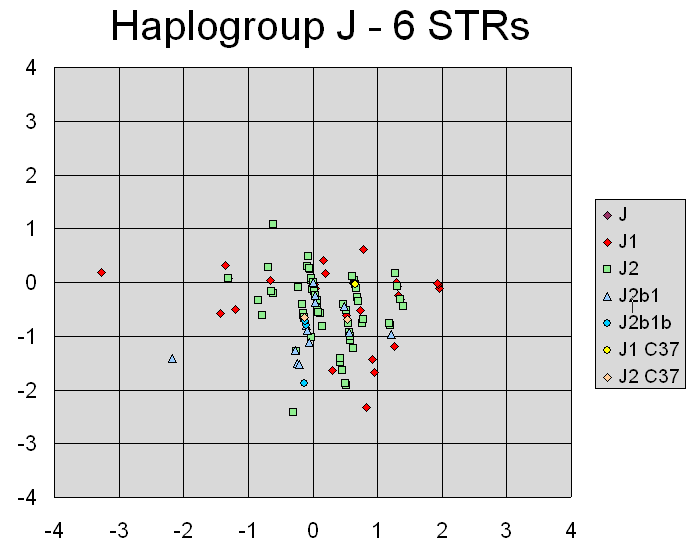
Principal components analysis scatterplot of Y-STR haplotypes from Haplogroup J, calculated using 6 STRs. With only six Y-STRs, it is not possible to resolve the different subgroups of Hg J.

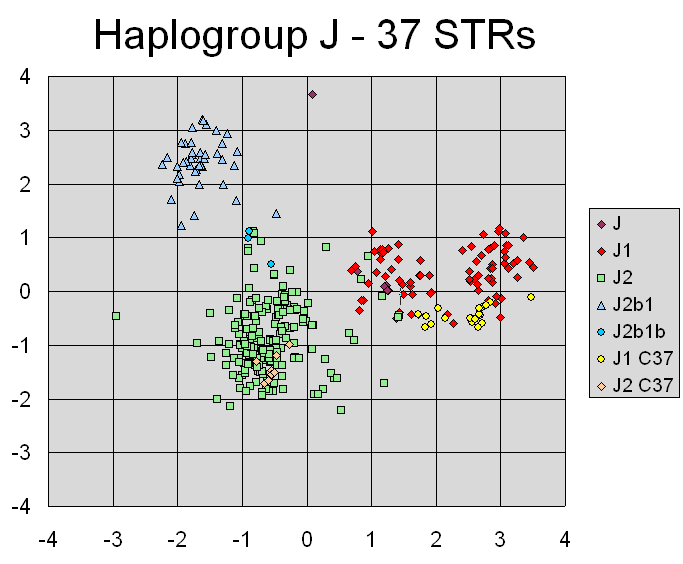
Principal components analysis scatterplot of Y-STR haplotypes from Haplogroup J, calculated using 37 STRs. With 37 Y-STR markers, clearly distinct STR clusters can be resolved, matching the distinct J1, J2 and J2b subgroups. The haplotypes often associated with Cohen lineages in each group are highlighted as J1 C37 and J2 C37, respectively.

One source of early confusion was the low resolution of the available tests. The Cohen Modal Haplotype (CMH), while frequent amongst Kohanim, also appeared in the general populations of haplogroups J1 and J2 with no particular link to the Kohen ancestry. These haplogroups occur widely throughout the Middle East and beyond. Thus, while many Kohanim have haplotypes close to the CMH, a greater number of such haplotypes worldwide belong to people with no apparent connection to the Jewish priesthood.

Individuals with at least 5/6 matches for the original 6-marker Cohen Modal Haplotype are found across the Middle East, with significant frequencies among various Arab populations, mainly those with the J1 Haplogroup. These have not been "traditionally considered admixed with mainstream Jewish populations" – the frequency of the J1 Haplogroup is the following: Yemen (34.2%), Oman (22.8%), Negev (21.9%), and Iraq (19.2%); and amongst Muslim Kurds (22.1%), Bedouins (21.9%), and Armenians (12.7%).

On the other hand, Jewish populations were found to have a "markedly higher" proportion of full 6/6 matches, according to the same (2005) meta-analysis. This was compared to these non-Jewish populations, where "individuals matching at only 5/6 markers are most commonly observed".

The authors Elkins, et al., warned in their report that "using the current CMH definition to infer relation of individuals or groups to the Cohen or ancient Hebrew populations would produce many false-positive results", and noted that "it is possible that the originally defined CMH represents a slight permutation of a more general Middle Eastern type that was established early on in the population prior to the divergence of haplogroup J. Under such conditions, parallel convergence in divergent clades to the same STR haplotype would be possible".

Cadenas et al. analysed Y-DNA patterns from around the Gulf of Oman in more detail in 2007. The detailed data confirm that the main cluster of haplogroup J1 haplotypes from the Yemeni appears to be some genetic distance from the CMH-12 pattern typical of eastern European Ashkenazi Kohanim, but not of Sephardic Kohanim.

=== Multiple ancestries ===
While there is evidence from Josephus and rabbinic sources that this tradition existed [I.E. was practiced and believed] by the end of the Second Temple (1st century CE, nearly a millennium and a half after the tradition places Aaron), there is no further evidence to support its historicity. According to modern biblical scholarship, a historical-critical reading of the biblical text suggests that the origin of the priesthood is much more complex, and that for much if not all of the First Temple period, kohen was not (necessarily) synonymous with "Aaronide". Rather, this traditional identity seems to have been adopted sometime around the second temple period.

Even within the Jewish Kohen population, it became clear that there were multiple Kohen lineages, including distinctive lineages both in Haplogroup J1 and in haplogroup J2. Other groups of Jewish lineages (i.e. Jews who are non-kohanim) and even non-Jews were found in Haplogroup J2 that matched the original 6-marker CMH, but which were unrelated and not associated with Kohanim. Current estimates, based on the accumulation of SNP mutations, place the defining mutations that distinguish haplogroups J1 and J2 as having occurred about 20 to 30,000 years ago.

== Subsequent studies ==
Subsequent research (by the original researchers and others) has challenged the original conclusion in a number of ways and has in fact shown that the genealogical record "refutes the idea of a single founder for Jewish Cohanim who lived in Biblical times."}.

A 2009 academic study by Michael F. Hammer, Doron M. Behar, et al. examined more STR markers in order to sharpen the "resolution" of these Kohanim genetic markers, thus separating both Ashkenazi and other Jewish Kohanim from other populations, and identifying a more sharply defined SNP haplogroup, J1e* (now J1c3, also called J-P58*) for the J1 lineage. The research found "that 46.1% of Kohanim carry Y chromosomes belonging to a single paternal lineage (J-P58*) that likely originated in the Near East well before the dispersal of Jewish groups in the Diaspora. Support for a Near Eastern origin of this lineage comes from its high frequency in our sample of Bedouins, Yemenis (67%), and Jordanians (55%) and its precipitous drop in frequency as one moves away from Saudi Arabia and the Near East (Fig. 4). Moreover, there is a striking contrast between the relatively high frequency of J-58* in Jewish populations (»20%) and Kohanim (»46%) and its vanishingly low frequency in our sample of non-Jewish populations that hosted Jewish diaspora communities outside of the Near East." The authors state, in their "Abstract" to the article:

"These results support the hypothesis of a common origin of the CMH in the Near East well before the dispersion of the Jewish people into separate communities, and indicate that the majority of contemporary Jewish priests descend from a limited number of paternal lineages."

However, the study did not support a single Y-chromosomal Aaron from the biblical period, rather it showed a "limited number of paternal lineages" from around that period. Subsequent analysis found that even the "extended Cohen Modal Haplotype" probably split off from an older Cohen haplotype far more recently, less than 1,500 years ago.

== Kohanim in other haplogroups ==
Behar's 2003 data point to the following Haplogroup distribution for Ashkenazi Kohanim (AC) and Sephardic Kohanim (SC) as a whole:

Hg:	E3b	G2c	H	I1b	J	K2	Q	R1a1	R1b	Total
AC	3	0	1	0	67	2	0	1	2	76
	4%		1½%		88%	2½%		1½%	2½%	100%
SC	3	1	0	1	52	2	2	3	4	68
	4½%	1½%		1½%	76%	3%	3%	4½%	6%	100%

The detailed breakdown by 6-marker haplotype (the paper's Table B, available only online) suggests that at least some of these groups (e.g. E3b, R1b) contain more than one distinct Kohen lineage. It is possible that other lineages may also exist, but were not captured in the sample.

Hammer et al. (2009) identified Cohanim from diverse backgrounds, having in all 21 differing Y-chromosome haplogroups: E-M78, E-M123, G-M285, G-P15, G-M377, H-M69, I-M253, J-P58, J-M172*, J-M410*, J-M67, J-M68, J-M318, J-M12, L-M20, Q-M378, R-M17, R-P25*, R-M269, R-M124 AND T-M70.

== Y-chromosomal Levi ==
Similar investigation was made of males who identify as Levites. The priestly Kohanim are believed to have descended from Aaron (among those who believe he was a historical figure). He was a descendant of Levi, son of Jacob. The Levites comprised a lower rank of the Temple priests. They are considered descendants of Levi through other lineages. Levites should also therefore in theory share common Y-chromosomal DNA.

However, similar studies into Levite origins found the Levite genome to be significantly less homogeneous. While commonalities were found within the Ashkenazi-Levite genome (R1a-Y2619), no haplotype frequently common to Levites in general [I.E. Ashkenazi & Sephardi] was found. Additionally, the haplotype that was commonly found in Ashkenazi Levites is of a relatively recent origin from a single common ancestor estimated to have lived around 1.5–2.5 thousand years ago. Also, when further compared to the most frequent founding lineage found among Ashkenazi Cohen males, it was found that they do not share a common male ancestor within the time frame of the Biblical narrative. Finally, it is unclear whether the origin is Eastern Europe or the greater Middle East region (including Iran); however, the most recent findings indicate the latter.

The 2003 Behar et al. investigation of Levites found high frequencies of multiple distinct markers, suggestive of multiple origins for the majority of non-Aaronid Levite families. One marker, however, present in more than 50% of Eastern European (Ashkenazi) Jewish Levites, points to a common male ancestor or very few male ancestors within the last 2000 years for many Levites of the Ashkenazi community. This common ancestor belonged to the haplogroup R1a1, which is typical of Eastern Europeans or West Asians, rather than the haplogroup J of the Cohen modal haplotype. The authors proposed that the Levite ancestor(s) most likely lived at the time of the Ashkenazi settlement in Eastern Europe, and would thus be considered founders of this line, further speculating that the ancestor(s) were unlikely to have descended from Levites of the Near East.

However, a Rootsi, Behar, et al. study published online in Nature Communications in December 2013 disputed the previous conclusion. Based on its research into 16 whole R1 sequences, the team determined that a set of 19 unique nucleotide substitutions defines the Ashkenazi R1a lineage. One of these is not found among Eastern Europeans, but the marker was present "in all sampled R1a Ashkenazi Levites, as well as in 33.8% of other R1a Ashkenazi Jewish males, and 5.9% of 303 R1a Near Eastern males, where it shows considerably higher diversity." Rootsi, Behar, et al., concluded that this marker most likely originates in the pre-Diasporic Hebrews in the Middle East. However, they agreed that the data indicates an origin from a single common ancestor.

== Samaritan Kohanim ==
The Samaritan community in the Middle East survives as a distinct religious and cultural sect. It constitutes one of the oldest and smallest ethnic minorities in the Middle East, numbering slightly more than 800 members. According to Samaritan accounts, Samaritan Kohanim are descended from Levi, the Tsedaka clan is descended from Manasseh, while the Dinfi clan and the Marhiv clan are descended from Ephraim. Samaritans claim that the southern tribes of the House of Judah left the original worship as set forth by Joshua, and the schism took place in the twelfth century BCE at the time of Eli. The Samaritans have maintained their religion and history to this day, and claim to be the remnant of the House of Israel, specifically of the tribes of Ephraim and Manasseh with priests of the line of Aaron/Levi.

Since the Samaritans have maintained extensive and detailed genealogical records for the past 13–15 generations (approximately 400 years) and further back, researchers have constructed accurate pedigrees and specific maternal and paternal lineages. A 2004 Y-Chromosome study concluded that the lay Samaritans belong to haplogroups J1 and J2, while the Samaritan Kohanim belong to haplogroup E-M35.

"The Samaritan M267 lineages differed from the classical Cohen modal haplotype at DYS391, carrying 11 rather than 10 repeats", as well as, have a completely different haplogroup, which should have been "J1". Samaritan Kohanim descend from a different patrilineal family line, having haplogroup E1b1b1a (M78) (formerly E3b1a).

== See also ==
- Genetic genealogy
- Genetic studies on Jews
- Modal haplotype
