= Omran =

Omran or Omrane may refer to:

== Given name ==
=== Omran ===
- Omran Haydary (born 1998), Dutch-born Afghan football player
- Omran Jesmi (born 1976), Emirati footballer
- Omran Al-Kaysi (born 1943), Lebanese artist and historian
- Omran Sharaf (born 1984), Emirati engineer, space scientist, and government official
- Omran Al-Tawerghi (born 1997), Libyan footballer
- Omran al-Zoubi (1959–2018), Syrian politician and government minister

=== Omrane ===
- Omrane Ayari (born 1972), Tunisian wrestler
- Omrane Sadok (1937–2021), Tunisian boxer

== Surname ==
=== Omran ===
- Abbas Al Omran, Bahraini human rights and labor activist
- Adnan Omran (born 1934), Syrian diplomat, politician, government minister
- Amal Omran (born 1968), Syrian actress and director of Syria play
- Aseel Omran (born 1989), Saudi Arabian singer
- Lojain Omran (born 1977), Saudi Arabian TV and social media personality
- Nabil Omran (born 1981), Libyan futsal player

=== Omrane ===
- Kamel Omrane (1951–2018), Tunisian scholar of Islam, politician and minister

== Places ==
- Al-Omran (also spelled Al-Umran), a city in Al-Ahsa Governorate, Saudi Arabia
- Ahmad-e Omran also known as Maʿbūdī, a village in Jazireh-ye Minu Rural District, Minu District, Khorramshahr County, Khuzestan Province, Iran
- Bou Omrane, a town in central Tunisia in Gafsa Governorate
- Omran Kandi, a village in Nazarkahrizi Rural District, Nazarkahrizi District, Hashtrud County, East Azerbaijan Province, Iran
- El Omrane Mosque, a mosque in Tunis
- Souk El Omrane, one of the markets of Bab Jebli in the medina of Sfax, Tunisia

== Business and Economy ==
- Omran Company, a government-owned company mandated to drive the investment, growth and development of the tourism sector in the Sultanate of Oman
- Omran Sahel, an Iranian company owned or controlled by Khatam al-Anbia

== See also ==
- Imran, a spelling of this name
