= Imran Ali =

Imran Ali may refer to:

== People ==
- Imran Ali (cricketer, born 1994) (born 1994), Bangladeshi cricketer
- Imran Ali (Faisalabad cricketer) (born 1983), Pakistani cricketer
- Imran Ali (Indian cricketer), Indian cricketer
- Imran Ali (Kuwait cricketer) (born 1980), Kuwaiti cricketer
- Imran Ali (Pakistan International Airlines cricketer) (born 1987), Pakistani cricketer

== See also ==
- Ali Imran (disambiguation)
