= Ezra-nama =

The Ezra-nama (Persian: عزرا نامه, ʿEzrā-nāma) is a Persian versification of the Book of Ezra containing midrashic and Iranian legends composed by the Judeo-Persian Shahin (fl. c. 1325). The work, which is of 500 distichs, is generally found at the end of Shahin's Ardashir-nama and is composed in the same meter.

== Plot ==
The story deals with Cyrus the Great who was called "God's Messiah". According to the Ezra-nama, Cyrus was born of Esther and Ahaseurus, King of Persia. The legend was created to possibly answer to important question with regards to Jewish history, the Talmud and the midrashim: how come a gentile was elected "God's Messiah", why were the Jews freed in Babylon through Cyrus, etc. The Book of Esther retells that Cyrus was seated on the throne of the King Solomon, an honor that had not been granted to the kings of Israel. Shahin however portrays Cyrus as Esther's son and hence as Jew through his mother.

In this Jewish Persian epic poem, the birth of Cyrus is depicted as a divine gift. Cyrus shows grace, beauty and goodness as a child. He is presented as a divine figure in parallel with prophets and king of Israel. In the poem, his sense of truth, justice and bravery are shown to be unrivaled among the kings of the world. The story then retells the struggle of Ezra to rebuild the temple after its destruction of the temple by Nebuchadnezzar. Ezra asks the Jewish people to meet Cyrus and talk to him about their peoplehood. Ezra asks Cyrus to liberate the Jews from torture and let them return to their Holy Land. The drama of freeing the Jews from Babylonian yoke and restoration of their existence is illustrated vividly in the Ezra-nama. Cyrus the Great who is depicted as ruling by the will of God is depicted as hero. After his death, a long eulogy about him brings to end the third of the story. The poet finishes the poem by describing the death of Esther and Mordechai and their burial in the city of Hamadan.
