= Imran Majeed =

Pakistani Physician and General

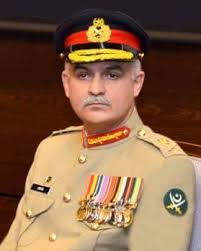
- Lieutenant General Syed Muhammad Imran Majeed
- Born: Syed Muhammad Imran Majeed; 1958 (age 67–68); Sialkot, Sialkot, Punjab
- Military career
- Allegiance: Pakistan
- Branch: Pakistan Army
- Service years: 1977–2019
- Rank: Lt. Gen.
- Unit: Pakistan Army Medical Corps
- Commands: Surgeon General Pakistan AMC; Director General Medical Services; Vice Chancellor NUMS; Consultant Cardiologist AFIC; Electrophysiologist AFIC
- Conflicts: Indo-Pakistani War of 1999; Indo-Pakistani Standoff (2001); War in North-West Pakistan; Battle of Swat
- Awards: Hilal-i-Imtiaz (military)

Syed Muhammad Imran Majeed HI(M) (born 1958) served as the surgeon general of the Pakistani Army from 2015 to 2016. He was a consultant cardiologist and cardiac electrophysiologist at the Armed Forces Institute of Cardiology and Professor of Medicine at the Army Medical College, Rawalpindi between 1997 and 2015. He was a pioneer of Clinical Cardiac Electrophysiology in Pakistan establishing a formal Department of this specialty at AFIC in 2001. He retired in 2019 from the Pakistan Army. He served as the founding Vice Chancellor of the NUMS from 2 July 2016 - 19 January 2022.

== Early life and education ==
Imran was born in Sialkot in 1958 to a middle-class family. He attended Cadet College Hasan Abdal, left King Edward Medical University (KEMU) and graduated from the first batch of the Army Medical College with a Bachelor of Medicine and Bachelor of Surgery (MBBS) in 1982. He received fellowship of the College of Physicians and Surgeons Pakistan. Imran received his specialty in cardiology. He completed his Fellowship in Clinical Cardiac Electrophysiology at St George's Hospital and Medical School, London, United Kingdom from 1990 to 1991. He was a visiting professor at the Cedars Sinai Medical Center, Los Angeles, USA in 2001.

== Military career ==
After joining the Pakistan Army, Imran quickly climbed in rank as he excelled at various assignments. In 2012 he was promoted to Major General, and was made Commandant of Armed Forces Institute of Cardiology

Imran is among the founders of the National University of Medical Sciences and served as its Founding Vice Chancellor from 2016 to 2022. In 2015, Imran was awarded the second-highest military award, the Hilal-i-Imtiaz–Military. That same year, he was promoted to Lieutenant General. In 2015, he was made the Surgeon General of the Pakistani Army and was promoted to Colonel Commandant of the Pakistan Army Medical Corps.
