= Charles Hamilton (orientalist) =

British orientalist

Charles Hamilton (1752/3–1792) was a British orientalist, known for his English translation of Al-Hidayah.

== Life ==
Born in Belfast about 1753, he was the only son of Charles Hamilton (died 1759), merchant, by Katherine Mackay (died 1767). After spending two years in the office of a Dublin merchant, he obtained a cadetship on the East India Company's establishment at Bengal, and went to India in 1776. He gained his first commission on 24 October that year, and was promoted lieutenant on 10 July 1778.

Hamilton studied oriental languages, and became one of the first members of the Asiatic Society of Calcutta. He returned to England for his major work of translation, completed and published in 1791. He was appointed resident at the court of the grand vizier at Oudh, and prepared to leave England. Symptoms of consumption, however, appeared, and he was recommended to take a voyage to Lisbon; but he died at Hampstead on 14 March 1792, aged 39, and was buried in Bunhill Fields. A monument to his memory was later erected in Belfast by his sisters, who included Elizabeth Hamilton.

== Works ==
While engaged in an expedition against the Rohillas he collected the materials Historical Relation of the Origin, Progress, and Final Dissolution of the Government of the Rohilla Afgans in the Northern Provinces of Hindostan, 1787, compiled from a Persian manuscript and other original papers. In 1786 he obtained permission to return home for five years in order to translate from Persian the Al-Hidayah, published as the Hedaya, or Guide, a work of fiqh; he was selected for the task by the governor-general and council of Bengal. The work appear in four quarto volumes, in 1791. A second edition of the Hedaya, by Standish Grove Grady, was published in 1870.
