= Imran (disambiguation) =

Imran is a given name and a surname.

Imran may refer to:

- Al Imran, the third chapter (surah) of the Quran
- Imran (father of Mary mother of Jesus)
- Imran (father of Miriam)
- Imran series, a series of Urdu spy novels written by Pakistani author Ibn-e-Safi
- Imran Series (Mazhar Kaleem), a series of Urdu spy novels written by Pakistani author Mazhar Kaleem
- Imran, a fictional character portrayed by Mir Mehrooz in the 2019 Indian film Notebook

== See also ==
- Imrani (1454–1536), Judæo-Persian poet
- Rofiat Imuran (born 2004), is a Nigerian footballer who plays in the English Women's Super League
