= Ali Imran (disambiguation) =

Ali Imran is a fictional character in various detective novels written by Ibn-e-Safi.

Ali Imran may also refer to:

- Ali Imran (cricketer, born 1985), Quetta cricket team player
- Ali Imran (cricketer, born 1998), Islamabad cricket team player

== See also ==
- Ali Imran Ramz (born 1979), Bengali politician
- Al Imran, third chapter of the Quran
- Imran Ali (disambiguation)
