= Shahin Shirazi =

Persian Jewish poet (14th century)

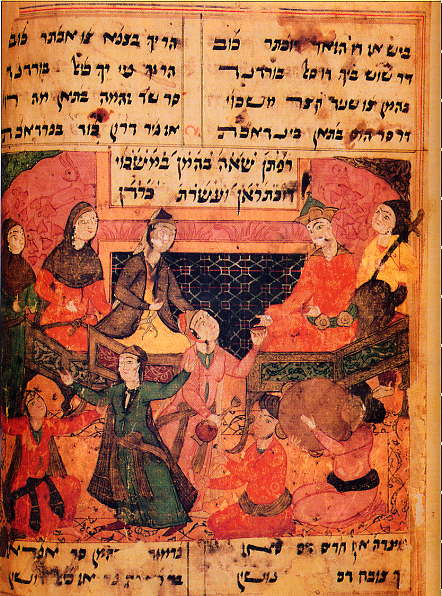
A page from an illustrated version of Shirazi's Ardashir-namah

Shāhin-i Shirāzi (Persian: شاهین شیرازی, born in Shiraz in the Ilkhanate, Iran) was a Persian Jewish poet in the 14th century.

== Biography ==
The details surrounding his biography are not clear. It is known that he worked during the reign of Ilkhan Abu Sa'id Bahadur Khan (1316-1335), and that he was also a contemporary of the Persian poet Hafez (d. 1390), who was also from Shiraz. It is unclear whether '"Shahin" is the poet's first name or his pen name. It is possible that he was from Kashan and that he was buried in Shiraz.

== Works ==
His works include epic cycles (poetic epics) from the Torah and from later parts of the Hebrew Bible. The Musā-nāmah was composed in 1327, and includes narratives from the books of Exodus, Leviticus, Numbers, Deuteronomy. The work contains close to 10,000 couplets. His versification of the Book of Genesis, the Bereshit-nāmah, was composed around 1358; it contains close to 8700 couplets.

His epic poem on the tale of Esther, Ardashir-nāmah, includes multiple stories in addition to the well-known biblical narrative. For example, Shāhin also expounds on the adventures of Shiru, the son of Ardashir (Ahaseurus) and Queen Vashti.

Shahin and his successor Imrani sought to compose a national epic analogous to the Shahnameh.

=== Editions and translations ===
- "אוצר החכמה". tablet.otzar.org.
- "אוצר החכמה". tablet.otzar.org.
- Ardashir-nāmah (The book of Ardashir)
- Ezra-nāmah (The Book of Ezra)
- David Gilinsky, "An original critical edition with English translation of Chapter 26 of Ardashir Nameh", BA Finals Dissertation, Cambridge University, April 1992, available from Cambridge University Library and on SCRIBD.
- Vera Basch Moreen (tr. and ed.), In Queen Esther's Garden: An Anthology of Judeo-Persian Literature (Yale Judaica): Yale 2000, ISBN 0300079052. Includes excerpts from Shāhin's epics in English translation

=== Musical Adaptations ===
In 2022, Iranian-Canadian composer, Iman Habibi, composed Shāhīn-nāmeh as a winner of the 2022 Azrieli Music Prize. Shāhīn-nāmeh is a 25-minute piece for orchestra and soloist on the story of Queen Esther from Ardashir-Nameh, and uses poetry from Shahin Shirazi's Ardashir-nameh. This piece was premiered by Orchestre Métropolitain and Sepideh Raissadat in Montreal.

==== Bereshit-nāmah ====
- Shāhīn, Sefer sharḥ-i Shāhīn-i Torah, ed. by Shimon Hakham (Jerusalem 5662/1902) (in Hebrew script).
- Muntakhab-i ashʿār-i fārsī az āthār-i yahūdiyyān-i Īrān, ed. by Amnon Netzer (Tehran 1352 AH/1973 CE), pp. 58-106 (transliterated into Arabic script).

== See also ==
- List of Persian-language poets and authors
- Persian literature
- Persian Jews
- Judeo-Persian
- 7dorim.com (Persian)
