= Umran (magazine) =

Umran is a Turkish magazine established in 1991.

== History and profile ==
Umran was first published in April 1991. The magazine is based in Istanbul, Turkey. It covers thought, culture and politics from an Islamic standpoint.

The frequency of Umran was quarterly in the first year. From the second year to 1997 the magazine was published bimonthly. From 1998 its frequency became monthly.
