= Imran Rahim =

Bangladeshi cricketer (born 1983)

Personal information
- Full name: Mohammad Imran Rahim
- Born: 7 January 1983 (age 43); Sylhet, Bangladesh
- Nickname: Lalu
- Batting: Right-handed
- Bowling: Slow left arm orthodox

Domestic team information
- Years: Team
- 2000/01–2002/03: Sylhet Division
- First-class debut: 22 November 2000 Sylhet Division v Dhaka Metropolis
- Last First-class: 13 January 2003 Sylhet Division v Khulna Division
- List A debut: 25 November 2000 Sylhet Division v Dhaka Metropolis
- Last List A: 27 January 2002 Sylhet Division v Barisal Division

Career statistics
Competition	FC	LA
Matches	15	2
Runs scored	91	5
Batting average	11.37	5.00
100s/50s	–/–	–/–
Top score	22*	5
Balls bowled	2178	18
Wickets	26	–
Bowling average	29.84	–
5 wickets in innings	–	–
10 wickets in match	–	–
Best bowling	4/51	0/11
Catches/stumpings	8/–	–/–
- Source: Cricket Archive, 15 November 2016

Mohammad Imran Rahim is a First-class and List A cricketer from Bangladesh. He was born on 7 January 1983 in Sylhet, Chittagong and is sometimes known by his nickname Lalu. He made his debut in 2000/01 for Sylhet Division and played until 2002/03. A right-handed tail end batsman and slow left arm orthodox bowler, his best bowling of 4 for 51 came against Khulna Division.
