= Abbas Al Omran =

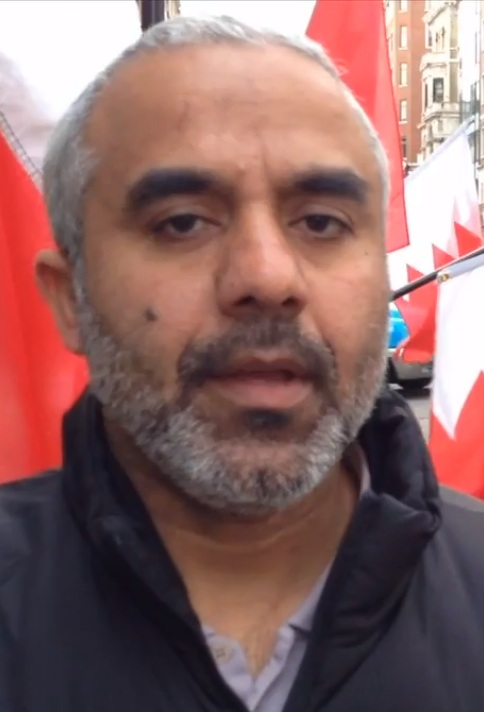
- Born: Bahrain
- Organization: Member of the British-based Bahrain Center for Human Rights
- Known for: His active membership with the Bahrain Centre for Human Rights
- Website: https://twitter.com/abbasalomran

Abbas Al Omran is a Bahraini human rights and labor activist. He currently resides in London, England after his arrest, torture, and conviction in Bahrain for political crimes.

== Early life ==
Prior to his entry into political activism, Abbas Al Omran worked in the oil industry at Bahrain Petroleum Company, also known as Bapco. His time, however, was short-lived after Al Omran was found communicating to the media regarding poor reviews on Bapco. The company then proceeded to dismiss him from his position after they had already banned him from the company's e-mail.

== Political activism ==
Abbas Al Omran is a member of the British-based Bahrain Centre for Human Rights. He is a primary activist for Bahrain that now resides in the United Kingdom after he was arrested and tortured. Although he has recently resided in London, he was put on the list of wanted persons in 2011 in Bahrain.

=== Involvement ===
In 2009, Al Omran was physically abused, along with Ali Mushaima, by a group of three that were said to be of African descent. In this attack, Al Omran suffered several injuries including swelling of his right eye, lower right shoulder, knees and elbow. Al Omran and Mushaima were known in the London area for their peaceful protests because Al Omran is a human rights activist.

In Bahrain in 2013, the use of protest masks, also known as Guy Fawkes masks, have been banned and the country has strictly shut down the import of these masks. Al Omran became involved in this issue, as he stated in an interview with The Cutting Edge News that "he didn't think the ban would have much effect, as there are already many of the masks already in Bahrain, and the masks can still be sneaked in or even made at home."

=== Conviction ===
On September 29, 2013, roughly 50 individuals were tried under the terrorism laws, including many Bahrain Centre of Human Rights members. Among the accused was Al Omran. This case is known as the "February 14th Coalition." Al Omran was sentenced to 15 years imprisonment. However, in an interview regarding the court case, Maryam al-Khawaja, who is the President of the Bahrain Centre of Human Rights, was quoted saying, "There was no due process in the entirety of this case which is why the defendants and their lawyers decided to boycott. From the time that the defendants were abducted, tortured and then sentences, nothing was done according to international standards of a fair trial. If these fifty people were really guilty of a crime, why was the only evidence presented confessions extracted under torture? This was a sham trial with a political verdict, they should be released immediately."

== See also ==
- Bahrain Centre for Human Rights
- Torture in Bahrain
- Abdulhadi al-Khawaja
- Maryam al-Khawaja
