= Imran Mayo =

Pakistani field hockey player

Imran Mayo, also known as Muhammad Imran Junior, is a field hockey player on the Pakistan National Hockey Team.
