= Emran Feroz =

Afghan-Austrian journalist, writer, and activist

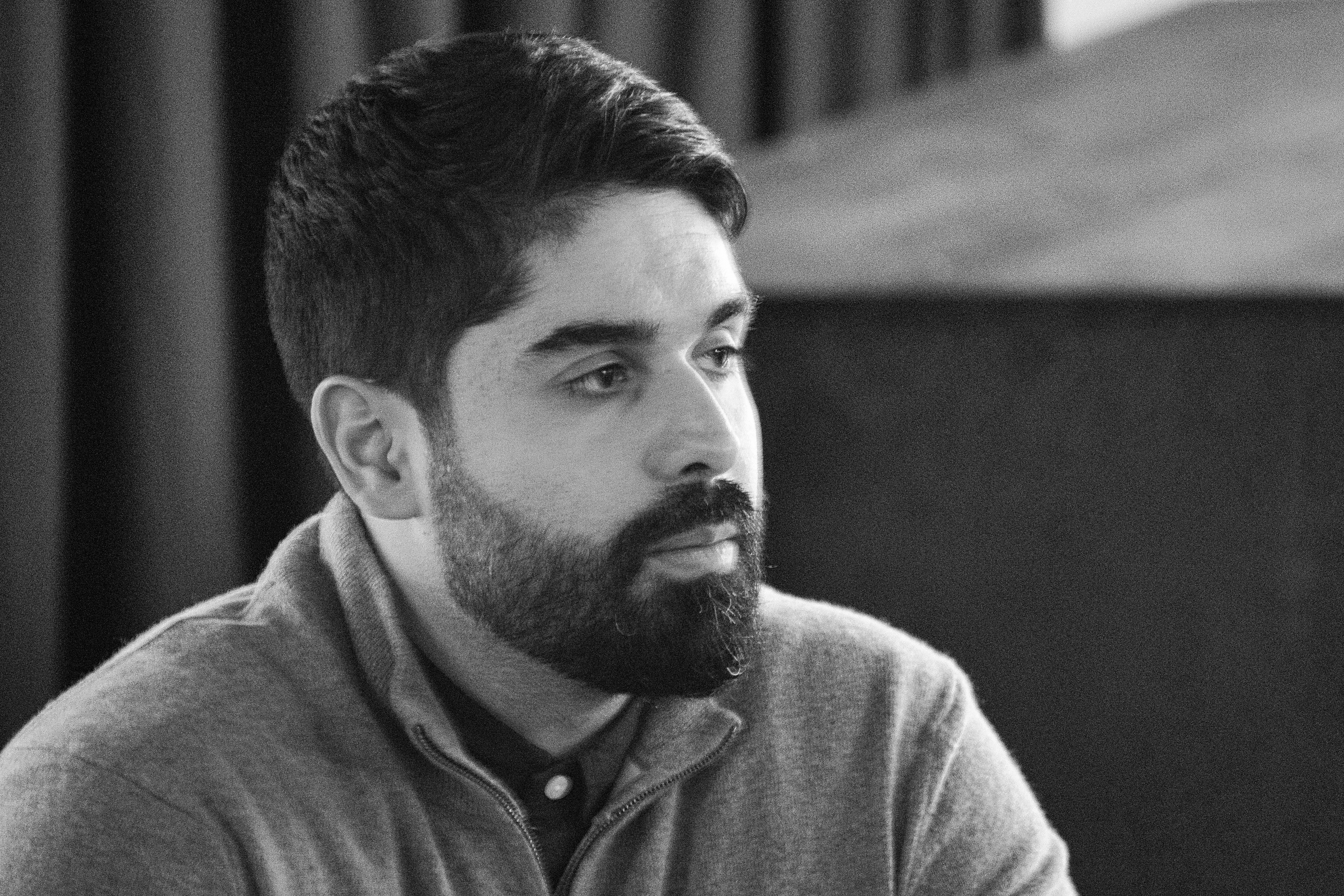
Feroz in 2024

Emran Feroz (born 1991 in Innsbruck) is an Austrian-Afghan journalist and author.

Feroz' parents fled to Austria because of the Soviet invasion of Afghanistan. He studied political science and Islamic studies at the University of Tübingen. He works as a freelance journalist for media such as Die Zeit, Die Tageszeitung, Al Jazeera and The New York Times. His focus are Afghanistan and drone strikes by the US. Feroz founded the virtual memorial site Drone Memorial for civilian victims of drone strikes, also because he lost own family due to drone strikes. In the course of the 2021 Taliban offensive and the removal of US troops from Afghanistan, he was interviewed as an expert by many German-speaking and international media, including CNN. His book Der längste Krieg ("The longest war"), which was published in 2021 during the time of the Taliban offensive, became a bestseller in Germany.

In 2021, he was awarded the Concordia Award for human rights journalism for a report about an asylum seeker that he did for the Austrian magazine Profil.

In June 2024, in an interview with the Die Zeit newspaper, Feroz advocated to exempt potential deportations to Afghanistan.

== Works ==
- Tod per Knopfdruck. Das wahre Ausmaß des US-Drohnen-Terrors oder wie Mord zum Alltag werden konnte. Westend Verlag 2017.
- Kampf oder Untergang! Warum wir gegen die Herren der Menschheit aufstehen müssen. Noam Chomsky in conversation with Emran Feroz. Westend Verlag 2018.
- Der längste Krieg. 20 Jahre War on Terror. Westend Verlag 2021.
- Graveyard Empire. Four Decades of Western Wars in Afganistan. Interlink Publishing Group, Inc. 2024.
