= Imran Ali (Indian cricketer) =

Indian cricketer

Personal information
- Full name: Imran Ali
- Role: Batsman

Domestic team information
- Years: Team
- 1964–1976: Vidarbha
- 1969: Central Zone

Career statistics
| Competition | FC |
|---|---|
| Matches | 45 |
| Runs scored | 1,799 |
| Batting average | 23.98 |
| 100s/50s | 1/9 |
| Top score | 104* |
| Balls bowled | 78 |
| Wickets | 0 |
| Bowling average | n/a |
| 5 wickets in innings | 0 |
| 10 wickets in match | 0 |
| Best bowling | 0/0 |
| Catches/stumpings | 37/- |
- Source: CricketArchive, 25 June 2013

Imran Ali (date of birth unknown) was an Indian cricketer who played regularly for Vidarbha during the 1960s and 1970s. A talented junior player, he toured Ceylon with an India Schools representative side in April 1964, and made his first-class debut for Vidarbha during the 1964–65 season. Playing as a middle-order batsman, Imran established himself as a regular player in Vidarbha's Ranji Trophy team throughout the next decade, and during the 1968–69 season even played two matches for Central Zone in the Duleep Trophy, although without much success. He retired at the end of the 1976–77 season after thirteen seasons for Vidarbha, having captained the side in his final two seasons.

== Cricket career ==
Little is known of Imran's early life, including his date and place of birth. His first matches at higher levels came for a Vidarbha team in the 1962–63 and 1963–64 editions of the Cooch Behar Trophy, a school-based tournament. His good form for Vidarbha led to his selection first for a Central Zone Schools side, and then for an India Schools side that toured Ceylon (now Sri Lanka) in April 1964, and included future Test cricketers Surinder Amarnath, Ramnath Parkar, Ashok Gandotra, and Eknath Solkar. Imran scored a century in the team's match against a Jaffna Schools side, an innings of 102 not out batting alongside Ramesh Nagdev, who scored 85 runs.

Following on from this good form at junior levels, Imran made his first-class for Vidarbha's senior side during the 1964–65 season of the Ranji Trophy, and went on to play in each of the team's three matches during the tournament, scoring his first half-century, an innings of 83 runs, in the final match against Madhya Pradesh. He soon established himself as a regular player in Vidarbha's side, usually as a middle-order batsman. An innings of 94 runs scored against Rajasthan during the 1968–69 season led to Imran's selection to play for Central Zone in that season's edition of the Duleep Trophy. However, he played only two matches for Central Zone (the second against the touring Australians), and was not selected in the side in later seasons.

Imran remained a consistent, although not outstanding, player for Vidarbha throughout the 1970s. Arguably his most successful seasons came towards the middle of the decade: he scored over 200 runs during both the 1974–75 and 1975–76 seasons, averaging 37.91 runs over both seasons combined. Imran's only first-class century was an innings of 104 not out scored against Railways in November 1975. This included a 96-run partnership with Sirish Najbile (60 runs) for the fifth wicket. The 1976–77 season was Imran's last at first-class level. For his final two seasons, he replaced Murthy Rajan as captain of Vidarbha, captaining the side in eight matches for five draws and three losses. He finished his career having scored 1,799 runs from 45 first-class matches, at an average of 23.98.
