= Imran Al Aradi =

Pakistani-Bahraini stand up comedian and disc jockey in the Kingdom of Bahrain

Imran Al Aradi is a Pakistani-Bahraini stand up comedian and disc jockey in the Kingdom of Bahrain. He is primarily famous for being a radio personality on Radio Bahrain. His comedic style and hosting skills has led to him being dubbed as "the funniest man in Bahrain".

== Biography ==
Imran was born to a Bahraini father and Pakistani mother. As a result, he grew up learning Arabic, English, Urdu and Punjabi. He studied at Naseem International School in the late 1990s, where he obtained an American high school diploma. He later studied for a BSc in Business informatics at AMA International University. He worked as a Product Marketing manager for a small company and then as an IT consultant for Batelco, the country's largest telecommunications company, where he worked until 2008. In July 2006, he began his tenure at Radio Bahrain as a radio presenter where he works till the present day.

=== Comedy career ===
It was in 2008 that Imran entered stand up comedy, working as a self-employed promoter. He represented Bahrain at the Amman Stand-up Comedy Festival in Jordan in December 2008. Imran joined a regional comedy tour, Comedy Arabia in Dubai, in 2009. He hosted multiple visiting comedians to Bahrain and Saudi Arabia, including Maz Jobrani in April 2010. Imran regularly hosts and promotes stand-up comedy auditions to boost local-talent in the country, the most recent of which are the "Block 338 Open Mic nights". He has stated that his greatest achievement was "being able to sustain a living as an entertainer". Imran currently performed in the most successful comedy show in Bahrain called Chicken Nuggets.
