= Armed Forces Institute of Cardiology =

Armed Forces Institute of Cardiology مسلح افواج امراض دل ہسپتال
- Government of Pakistan, Pakistan Army
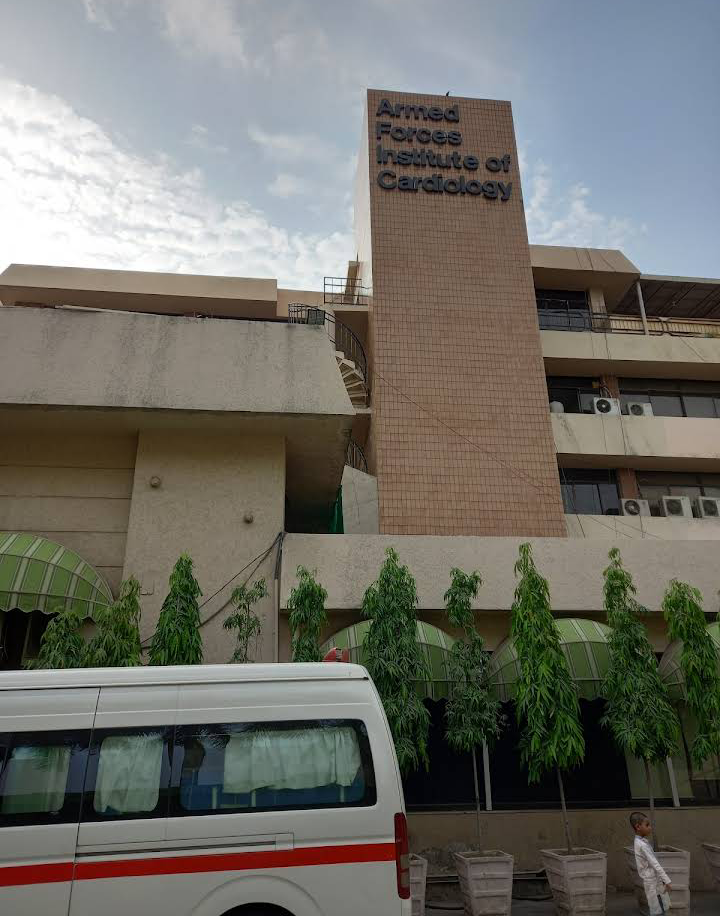

Geography
- Location: Rawalpindi, Punjab, Pakistan

Organisation
- Care system: Public/Government
- Type: Cardiology
- Affiliated university: Army Medical College

Services
- Emergency department: Coronary Care Unit
- Beds: 800

History
- Opened: Pakistan Army

Links
- Website: http://afic.gov.pk/
- Other links: List of hospitals in Pakistan

The Armed Forces Institute of Cardiology (Urdu: مسلح افواج امراض دل ہسپتال, or AFIC) also known as the National Institute of Heart Diseases or NIHD is a government and military cardiac hospital located in Rawalpindi Cantonment, Punjab, Pakistan. This 800-bed cardiac health care institute is a major institute and hospital in Pakistan. The hospital delivers heart disease and health care services to people of Pakistan Armed Forces and fellow citizens of Pakistan.

== History ==
According to history pages, this institute started operating in 1970. The Pakistan Army Cardiac Service started in 1953 in Cardiothoracic Centre Rawalpindi. The first angiography was done in 1969 and the first open heart surgery was done in 1970. In 1978, the Cardiothoracic Centre Rawalpindi was upgraded as Armed Forces Institute of Cardiology. 3 years after in 1981, the hospital extended their services to all Pakistani Citizens and upgraded to National Institute of Heart Diseases under the President of Pakistan's directions.

Before Malala Yousafzai was airlifted to Queen Elizabeth Hospital Birmingham in England for international treatment, she had been cared for by Pakistani and visiting British doctors at the Institute. She had been flown there from the Combined Military Hospital Peshawar, where she had been taken from the District Hospital in Swat.

== Departments and Units ==
The hospital is divided into the following departments and units.

=== Units ===
- Coronary Care Unit, 19 beds
- Surgical ITC, 19 beds

=== Departments ===
- Department of Echocardiography
- Department of Exercise Tolerance Test
- Department of Nuclear Cardiology
- Departments of Cardiac Electrophysiology
