= Imran Khalid Butt =

Pakistani politician

Member of the Provincial Assembly of the Punjab
- In office 15 August 2018 – 14 January 2023
- Constituency: PP-54 Gujranwala-IV
- In office 2008 – 31 May 2018
- Incumbent
- Assumed office 24 February 2024

Personal details
- Born: 3 July 1977 (age 49) Gujranwala, Punjab, Pakistan
- Party: PMLN (2008-present)

Imran Khalid Butt is a Pakistani politician who had been a Member of the Provincial Assembly of the Punjab from August 2018 till January 2023. Previously, he was a Member of the Provincial Assembly of the Punjab, from 2008 to May 2018.

== Early life and education ==
He was born on 3 July 1977 in Gujranwala.

He graduated from University of the Punjab in 1997 and has a degree of Bachelor of Arts.

== Political career ==
He ran for the seat of the Provincial Assembly of the Punjab as a candidate of Pakistan Muslim League (N) (PML-N) from Constituency PP-91 (Gujranwala-I) in the 2002 Pakistani general election, but was unsuccessful. He received 12,362 votes and lost the seat to Chaudhry Muhammad Ashraf Khumbo, a candidate of Pakistan Peoples Party (PPP).

He was elected to the Provincial Assembly of the Punjab as a candidate of PML-N from Constituency PP-91 (Gujranwala-I) in the 2008 Pakistani general election. He received 22,939 votes and defeated Rana Faisal Rauf Khan, a candidate of PPP.

He was re-elected to the Provincial Assembly of the Punjab as a candidate of PML-N from Constituency PP-91 (Gujranwala-I) in the 2013 Pakistani general election. He received 34,075 votes and defeated an independent candidate, Rizwan Ullah Butt.

In December 2013, he was appointed Parliamentary Secretary for industries & commerce.

He was re-elected to Provincial Assembly of the Punjab as a candidate of PML-N from Constituency PP-54 (Gujranwala-IV) in the 2018 Pakistani general election.
