= Haplotype convergence =

Haplotype convergence is the unrelated appearance of identical haplotypes in separate populations, through either convergent evolution or random chance.

== Description ==
Haplotype convergence is rare, due to the sheer odds involved of two unrelated individuals independently evolving exactly the same genetic sequence in the site of interest. Thus, haplotypes are shared mainly between very closely related individuals, as the genetic information in two related individuals will be much more similar than between unrelated individuals. Substitution bias further increases the likelihood of haplotype convergence, as this increases the probability of mutations occurring at the same site. Sequences may also diverge from the same original sequence and then revert, converging in this manner. Convergence through convergent evolution in two unrelated groups is much less common, as derived traits may arise through dramatically different pathways.

Erroneously determining two individuals to be identical due to haplotype convergence becomes much less likely when more genetic markers are tested, since that would require a larger amount of extremely rare coincidences. With modern high-throughput sequencing approaches, sequencing a large set of markers, or even the entire genome, is much more feasible and greatly minimizes these issues.

== Examples ==
In some regions, due to low diversity in the Y-STR gene (often used to study surname origin), haplotype convergence may confuse analyses, concluding unrelated individuals to be very closely related.

Similarly, a study of New World mitochondrial DNA haplogroups observed that similarities in haplotypes between Native Americans and Asians were a result of the hypervariability of the HVSI region in mitochondrial DNA, rather than common ancestry.

As an example of haplotype convergence due to convergent evolution in more distantly related groups, threespine stickleback in blackwater environments similar to that of the ancient bluefin killifish and black bream independently evolved the same haplotype in the SWS2 gene, which promotes better eyesight in those conditions.
