= Imran Ali (Kuwait cricketer) =

Kuwait cricketer (born 1980)

Personal information
- Full name: Imran Ali
- Born: 21 October 1980 (age 46); Kuwait
- Nickname: Mani
- Batting: Right-handed
- Bowling: Right-arm fast-medium
- Role: Bowler

International information
- National side: Kuwait (2019)
- T20I debut: 20 January 2019 v Maldives
- Last T20I: 24 January 2019 v Saudi Arabia

Domestic team information
- Years: Team
- 1999/00: Lahore City
- 2002/03–2005/06: Pakistan Customs
- 2005/06: Hyderabad
- 2006/07–2017/18: Sui Northern Gas Pipelines Limited
- 2006/07–2015: Lahore Lions
- 2006/07–2012/13: Lahore Ravi
- 2006/07–2008/09: Punjab
- 2012/13: Lahore Eagles
- 2015/16: Badureliya Sports Club

Career statistics
Competition	T20I	First-class	List A	Twenty20
Matches	4	114	65	52
Runs scored	5	1201	222	102
Batting average	5.00	11.66	14.80	11.33
100s/50s	0/0	0/0	0/0	0/0
Top score	5*	39	41*	27*
Balls bowled	90	18750	3075	1050
Wickets	7	395	101	52
Bowling average	19.42	22.63	23.66	24.21
5 wickets in innings	0	16	1	0
10 wickets in match	0	2	0	0
Best bowling	3/16	8/42	5/33	4/21
Catches/stumpings	2/–	37/–	17/–	15/–
- Source: ESPNCricinfo, 5 July 2026

Imran Ali (born 21 October 1980) is a former cricketer who played for Kuwait national cricket team. Ali was a right-handed batsman who bowled right-arm fast-medium. He was born in Kuwait.

Ali made his first-class debut for Lahore City in the 1999/00 Pakistani season, and made his List A debut for the same side in the same season. He made his Twenty20 debut for Lahore Lions against Rawalpindi Rams in the ABN-AMRO Twenty-20 Cup on 23 December 2006. After a long domestic career in Pakistan, he made his T20I debut for Kuwait against Maldives on 20 January 2019, taking 3 wickets for 16 runs.

During his domestic career, Ali represented Lahore City, Lahore Blues, Lahore Whites, Pakistan Customs, Hyderabad, Lahore Ravi, Punjab, Sui Northern Gas Pipelines Limited, Lahore Lions, Lahore Eagles and Badureliya Sports Club.

Ali established himself as a successful seam bowler in domestic cricket. In September 2008, playing for Sui Northern Gas Pipelines Limited in the Mohammad Nissar Trophy, he took a hat-trick against Delhi and finished with 6 wickets for 52 runs in the first innings. In March 2009, he scored a brisk 63 for Lahore Lions in a one-day match against Faisalabad Wolves. In December 2013, he took 5 wickets for 38 runs for Sui Northern Gas Pipelines Limited against Pakistan Television in the 2013–14 President's Trophy.

Ali played 114 first-class, 65 List A and 52 Twenty20 matches between 1999 and 2019, and also appeared in four T20Is for Kuwait, taking seven wickets.
