= Imran Bisthamin =

- Born: Imran Bisthamin; 1985 (age 40–41) Kandy, Sri Lanka

Rugby union career
- Position: Number 8
Senior career
Years	Team	Apps	(Points)
2004-2008	Kandy Sports Club		
International career
Years	Team	Apps	(Points)
2007-2008	Sri_Lanka		
National sevens team
Years	Team		Comps
2008	Sri Lanka		

Imran Bisthamin is a rugby union footballer in Sri Lanka who played for Sri Lanka, and Kandy Sports Club. He is a product of St. Anthony's College, Kandy, where he captained the college rugby team.

Bistamin played at Number 8 third-row-forward. Bisthamin represented the country at the Asian Rugby tournament in 2007.

== Injury ==
On November 22, 2008, Bisthamin faced career-threatening injuries to the head and spinal cord when he fell from an upper floor of a restaurant at the George R de Silva Shopping Complex in Kandy. He was unconscious and rushed to the Kandy General Hospital and treated in the intensive-care unit for Brain haemorrhage. He regained consciousness after three weeks.

== Controversy ==
On 2008, the exclusion of Bistamin from the Sri Lanka National Rugby Team ahead of Asian Five Nation Rugby Championship in Taiwan created a controversy with the second set of selectors led by Rohan Abeykoon protesting against the nepotistic move by Minister of Sports at that time, Gamini Lokuge.

== See also ==
- Sri Lanka national rugby union team
- Kandy Sports Club
- St. Anthony's College, Kandy
