= Bou Omrane =

- Location in Tunisia
- Coordinates: 34°21′21″N 9°6′13″E
- Country: Tunisia
- Governorate: Gafsa
- Time zone: UTC1 (CET)
- Postal code: 2125

Bou Omrane is a locality in central Tunisia in Gafsa Governorate.

== See also ==
- Culture of Tunisia
