= Imran Khand =

British businessman (1964 - 2016)

- Born: July 1964
- Died: 3 April 2016 (aged 51)
- Occupation: Businessman
- Known for: Co‑founder and CEO of Picsel; Chairman of Jabbar Group

Imran Khand was a British businessman. He was born in July 1964 and died on 3 April 2016.

== Business career ==
Khand was the chief executive officer and co-founder of the Picsel group of companies that created mobile software and was set up with the purpose to create short-term wealth for investing into charitable ventures from the outset. This was documented in several public articles and interviews globally throughout the years. He was also the chairman of Jabbar Group, which deals in a wide range of business activities including technology, architecture, master planning, city development, corporate and retail travel, human resource management, media, leisure and international property investment.

Khand established two successful technology companies prior to co-founding Picsel in 1998. Before that, Imran led a Scottish Government initiative for the development and training of young people, and was actively involved in a number of other government and community joint ventures. Khand has a degree in Computer Science from Paisley University.

Imran has maintained a keen interest in the charitable sector, which has led to the creation of a network of hospitals and universities in the Indian sub-continent, education development in China, and a series of UK-based community projects which have been designed to target underprivileged sectors of society, with particular interest in young people, the elderly, orphanages and women's centre support. He is also involved in funding a number of other research enterprises.

== Labour Party donation ==
Khand was revealed of being the main funder of "Muslim Friends of Labour" which was reported by The Times newspaper as making a donation to the Labour Party of £300,000 in late 2007. Khand remained an active member of the Labour Party until his death.

== Insolvency ==
On 15 July 2009, Picsel Technologies Ltd was placed in administration. On 17 July 2009, Khand was removed as CEO of Picsel Technologies Ltd by the administrators, Pricewaterhouse Coopers.. Khand remained the CEO of the shell company Picsel (Research) Ltd which owns the patents developed by Picsel Technologies Ltd until 28 July 2009 when that too was placed into Administration. Despite that, as of April 2010 Khand remains listed CEO and co-founder of Picsel. Khand formed two further companies to continue the Picsel business (Picsel UK Ltd in 2010 and Smartoffice Technologies Ltd in 2012) both of which subsequently become insolvent.
