= Imran Khan (solicitor) =

British solicitor

Imran Khan KC
- Born: 19 November 1964 (age 61); Pakistan
- Occupation: Lawyer

Imran Khan KC (born 19 November 1964) is a solicitor working in the United Kingdom. He became known for his representation of the family of Stephen Lawrence during the 1998 public inquiry into his murder.

== Biography ==
Khan was born in Pakistan in 1964 and moved from Pakistan to London in 1968 when he was nearly four years old. He grew up in Upton Park in East London. He attended Lister Community School in Plaistow and studied law at the University of East London, then known as the North East London Polytechnic, graduating in 1987.

He had been working as a lawyer for 18 months when he became the Lawrence's solicitor.

Khan was awarded the rank of Queen's Counsel in 2018.
