= Imran Khan (cricketer, born 1963) =

Pakistani cricketer (born 1963)

Personal information
- Born: 27 July 1963 (age 63); Quetta, Balochistan, Pakistan
- Batting: Right-handed
- Role: Wicket-keeper

Domestic team information
- Years: Team
- 1984–1987: Quetta

Career statistics
| Competition | FC | LA |
|---|---|---|
| Matches | 5 | 1 |
| Runs scored | 255 | 8 |
| Batting average | 31.87 | 8.00 |
| 100s/50s | 0/1 | 0/0 |
| Top score | 66 | 8 |
| Catches/stumpings | 6/3 | 0/1 |
- Source: ESPNCricinfo, 9 December 2014

Imran Khan (born 27 July 1963) is a former Pakistani cricketer who played first-class and limited-overs matches for Quetta during the mid-1980s.

A wicket-keeper from the city of Quetta, Imran represented the Quetta under-19s side at the National Under-19 Championship during the 1980–81 season. He made his debut for Quetta's senior side in October 1984, during the 1984–85 season of the BCCP Patron's Trophy. On debut against the Karachi Whites team, he came in third in the batting order in the first innings, after Rashid Raza and Raj Hans, but was demoted to seventh for the second innings.

Imran's next matches for Quetta came the following season, in November 1985, when he played two more Patron's Trophy matches and a single match in the one-day President's Trophy. In the two first-class matches, against Karachi Whites and Hyderabad, he opened the batting with Rashid Raza, with his highest first-class score, 66 runs, coming in the match against Hyderabad. Imran alternated the wicket-keeping duties with Mansoor Khan, with Mansoor keeping wicket against Karachi and Imran keeping wicket against Hyderabad. Imran's final two matches for Quetta came during the 1986–87 Patron's Trophy season, where he played solely as a batsman, scoring 47 not out and 48 against Pakistan Steel, and 47 against Karachi Whites.
