= Imran Khan (Indian cricketer) =

Indian cricketer

Personal information
- Full name: Mohammad Imran Khan
- Born: 15 May 1973 (age 53); Kanpur, Uttar Pradesh, India
- Batting: Right-handed
- Bowling: Right-arm medium
- Role: Opening batsman

Domestic team information
- Years: Team
- 2007–2009: Services

Career statistics
Competition	LA	T20
Matches	4	8
Runs scored	40	125
Batting average	10.00	15.62
100s/50s	0/0	0/0
Top score	31	40
Catches/stumpings	0/–	1/–
- Source: CricketArchive, 9 December 2014

Mohammad Imran Khan (born 15 May 1973) is a former Indian cricketer who played limited-overs and Twenty20 matches for Services during the late 2000s.

From Kanpur, Uttar Pradesh, Imran debuted for Services in February 2007, against Himachal Pradesh during the 2006–07 season of the Ranji Trophy One-Day tournament. A right-handed top-order batsman, he opened the batting with Amit Pal Singh on debut, making nine runs before being bowled by Jitender Mehta. Imran played three further one-day matches for Services, all within five days, from 16 to 20 February. His highest score, 31 runs, came in his second match, against Jammu and Kashmir, and was the highest score of Services' innings. However, he was dismissed without scoring from the first ball of his third match, against Delhi, and also made a duck in his final game, against Punjab.

Imran went on to play for Services in the inaugural Inter-State T20 Championship in April 2007, playing five Twenty20 matches in six days. He opened the batting with Tahir Khan in four of those games, but his highest score, 40 runs, came when opening with Yashpal Singh, against Himachal Pradesh. After a gap of more than two years, Imran made three further Twenty20 appearances for Services, during the 2009–10 season of the Syed Mushtaq Ali Trophy, which replaced the previous Inter-State T20 Championship. After a fourth-ball duck in the opening game against Himachal Pradesh, he was pushed down the order to number three for following two matches, scoring 15 runs against Punjab and 31 against Delhi. Imran finished his Twenty20 career with a batting average of 15.62 and a strike rate of 113.63.
