= Imran Khan (Guyanese cricketer) =

Guyanese cricketer

Personal information
- Born: 13 May 1982 (age 44); Chesney, Guyana
- Batting: Right-handed
- Bowling: Right-arm medium
- Role: Batsman

Domestic team information
- Years: Team
- 2006: Guyana

Career statistics
Competition	T20
Matches	4
Runs scored	54
Batting average	54.00
100s/50s	0/0
Top score	23*
Catches/stumpings	3/–
- Source: CricketArchive, 9 December 2014

Imran Khan (born 13 May 1982) is a Guyanese cricketer who played four Twenty20 matches for the Guyanese national side in 2006.

A middle-order batsman from Chesney in Guyana's East Berbice-Corentyne region, Khan represented the Guyanese under-19s at the 2000 WICB Under-19 Tournament, playing in three matches. After good form for Berbice in inter-county matches, he was selected in Guyana's squad for the inaugural 2006 Stanford 20/20 tournament. On debut against Montserrat in July 2006, he did not bat, but in Guyana's quarter-final against Jamaica, he scored 23 not out coming in eighth in the batting order. He and Andre Percival put on an unbroken partnership of 42 runs for the eighth wicket, helping Guyana to a three-wicket win with one over to spare. Khan made 21 not out in the semi-final against Grenada, promoted to sixth in the batting order, but was dismissed for 10 in the final against Trinidad and Tobago, which Guyana won by five wickets.

Because he was dismissed only once in his four matches, Khan has a batting average of 54.00 at Twenty20 level. He also finished the tournament with a strike rate of 180.00, having hit two fours and five sixes. His five sixes was the equal third-most of any player at the tournament, behind West Indies internationals Kieron Pollard and Daren Ganga. Although he has played no further matches for Guyana, Khan was, as of November 2014, still playing at club level in Berbice Cricket Board tournaments.
