= Imran Khan (Afghan cricketer) =

Afghan cricketer (born 2001)

Personal information
- Born: 11 March 2001 (age 25)
- Source: Cricinfo, 4 March 2019

Imran Khan (born 11 March 2001) is an Afghan cricketer. He made his first-class debut for Kabul Province in the 2018–19 Mirwais Nika Provincial 3-Day tournament on 2 March 2019.
