= Imrani =

Persian poet (1454–1536)

Emrānī (or Imrānī; 1454–1536) was a Judæo-Persian poet, being "one of the most prominent Jewish poets of Iran". Emrānī was inspired by the earlier poet Shāhīn to choose "as his field the post-Mosaic era from Joshua to the period of David and Solomon".

His major work, Fatḥ-Nameh ("The Book of the Conquest," begun in 1474, unfinished), describes in poetry "the events of the biblical books of Joshua, Ruth, and Samuel". Emrānī's last great work, Ganj-Nameh ("The Book of the Treasures"), is "a free poetic paraphrase of and commentary on the mishnaic treatise Avot".

Like his predecessor Shahin, he sought to compose a national epic analogous to the Shahnameh.

== Major works ==
- Fatḥ-Nameh ("The Book of the Conquest," begun in 1474, unfinished)
- Ganj-Nameh ("The Book of the Treasures", completed in 1536)
