= Imran Khan (businessman) =

Bangladeshi-American technology executive

- Born: June 16, 1977 (age 49); Dhaka, Bangladesh
- Education: University of Denver; Dhaka College; Government Laboratory High School, Dhaka
- Occupations: Tech executive; Tech investor; Entrepreneur
- Known for: Leading Alibaba Group IPO Leading Snap Inc. IPO
- Title: Founder and CIO of Proem Former Chief Strategy Officer of Snap Inc. Former Head of Global Internet Investment Banking at Credit Suisse

Imran Khan (born 1977) is a technology executive, entrepreneur and investor. He is the Founder and Chair of the Investment Committee of Proem Asset Management LP. Prior to Proem, he was the Chief Strategy Officer of the American multinational technology and social media company Snap Inc., where he helped lead the company to IPO as well as build up the operation, sales, expand business partnerships and manage overall corporate strategy. Before joining Snap Inc. in 2015, Khan was the head of global internet investment banking at Credit Suisse where he had a leading role on Chinese e-commerce giant Alibaba's IPO, the largest share sale ever.

== Early life and education ==
An immigrant from Bangladesh, Khan finished his high school from The Government Laboratory High School, Dhaka (1994). Then he passed H.S.C. from Dhaka College in 1996. He was a renowned debater during his college life. He moved to Colorado as a student. In 2000, he received his B.S.B.A. in Finance and Economics from the University of Denver.

== Career ==
=== Early career ===
Khan began his career at WildBlue, a Denver-based satellite-broadband startup. Shortly after, he joined ING Barings in New York then, when its banking business was sold to ABN Amro, Khan joined Fulcrum Global Partners where he conducted “sell-side” research on technology companies.

=== JPMorgan and Credit Suisse ===
In 2004, Khan was hired by JPMorgan as a researcher and eventually became Head of Global Internet and US Entertainment Equity Research becoming one of JPMorgan's youngest managing directors at the age of 29. While at JPMorgan, Khan was ranked the second best internet analyst by Institutional Investor’s annual rankings of researchers.

After six years with JPMorgan, in 2011, Khan joined Credit Suisse, where he took over the company's internet banking franchise and has been credited for raising the company's stature in tech banking. As the firm's Global Head of Internet Investment Banking, Khan is known for his leading role on the $25 billion Alibaba IPO, the largest ever share sale. He also worked on the IPOs of American companies like Groupon, GoDaddy and Box, as well as Chinese companies including Weibo, Jumei and Toudu.

While at Credit Suisse, Khan identified China as "the future of the Internet business" due to its young demographic and limited adoption of the Internet at the time. When Khan was hired at Credit Suisse, the company was already in discussions with Alibaba, a deal that Khan helped win due to prior relationships he had with the Chinese company.

=== Snap Inc. ===
Khan joined Snapchat in 2015 as Chief Strategy Officer where he directs the company's corporate strategy, including building up operations, expanding business partnerships, running ad sales and leading the company to its planned IPO. In his first 30 months at Snap Inc., he helped grow revenue from $0 to $728 million. He also helped secure a $200 million investment in Snapchat from Alibaba in 2015 as well as an additional $1.8 billion in funding in 2016.

In 2016, Khan was named one of the Most Indispensable Executives in Marketing, Media and Tech by advertising trade magazine Adweek in its annual Adweek 50 List. Adweek noted that it chose Khan due to his work growing Snapchat including opening new offices for Snapchat; making several executive hires; and launching Snapchat Partners.

In March 2017, Snap Inc. went public, with the company reaching a market cap high of $34 billion within two days of its IPO. Khan reportedly had over $145 million worth of stock at the time of Snap Inc's IPO.

In 2018, Khan founded Proem Asset Management LP, a hedge fund specializing in concentrated long/short equity investments.

In August 2023, entities managed by Khan acquired a 2.5% stake in Dave Inc. In addition, Khan joined the Board of Directors. Khan also serves on the Board of Directors of Zeta Global.
