= Imraan Khan (cricketer, born January 1984) =

South African cricketer (born 1984)

Personal information
- Born: 21 January 1984 (age 42); Klerksdorp, Transvaal, South Africa
- Batting: Right-handed
- Bowling: Right-arm medium
- Role: Batsman

Domestic team information
- Years: Team
- 2004–2005: North West

Career statistics
Competition	FC	LA
Matches	4	3
Runs scored	172	76
Batting average	21.50	25.33
100s/50s	0/1	0/0
Top score	78	29
Catches/stumpings	0/–	0/–
- Source: CricketArchive, 14 December 2014

Imraan Khan (born 21 January 1984) is a former South African cricketer who played first-class and limited overs matches for North West during the 2004–05 season.

A right-handed batsman from Klerksdorp, Khan played at under-19 level for North West during the 2002–03 UCB Under-19 Competition. He made his first-class debut for North West in October 2004, against Griqualand West in the UCB Provincial Cup. On debut at Sedgars Park, Potchefstroom, he opened the batting with North West captain Richard Stroh, scoring 78 runs from 137 balls. Khan made his one-day debut shortly after, against Griqualand West at the same venue, and scored 28 runs. He bettered that total in his next one-day match, against Western Province less than a week later, making 29 before being bowled by Waleed Samsodien. That match, played at Newlands, had been preceded by a three-day match against the same side, in which Khan scored only 10 runs for the match and North West lost by an innings.

Khan's next matches for North West were played against Boland in January 2005, at Boland Park, Paarl – a three-day match followed immediately by a one-day game. In the three-day fixture, he scored 13 and 38, with the latter innings including a single six. In the one-day fixture, his final at that level, he scored 19 runs before caught behind by Wesley Euley off of Pepler Sandri. Khan's final inter-provincial match for North West came against Eastern Province. He was run out by Luke Roberts and Bruce Friderichs for three in the first innings, and in the second innings was leg before wicket to Deon Carolus for eight. Khan was replaced by Jimmy Kgamadi for the corresponding one-day fixture against Eastern Province, who scored 50 runs and consequently maintained his place in the side for North West's unsuccessful semi-final against Free State.
