= Imran Khan (web developer) =

Indian web developer

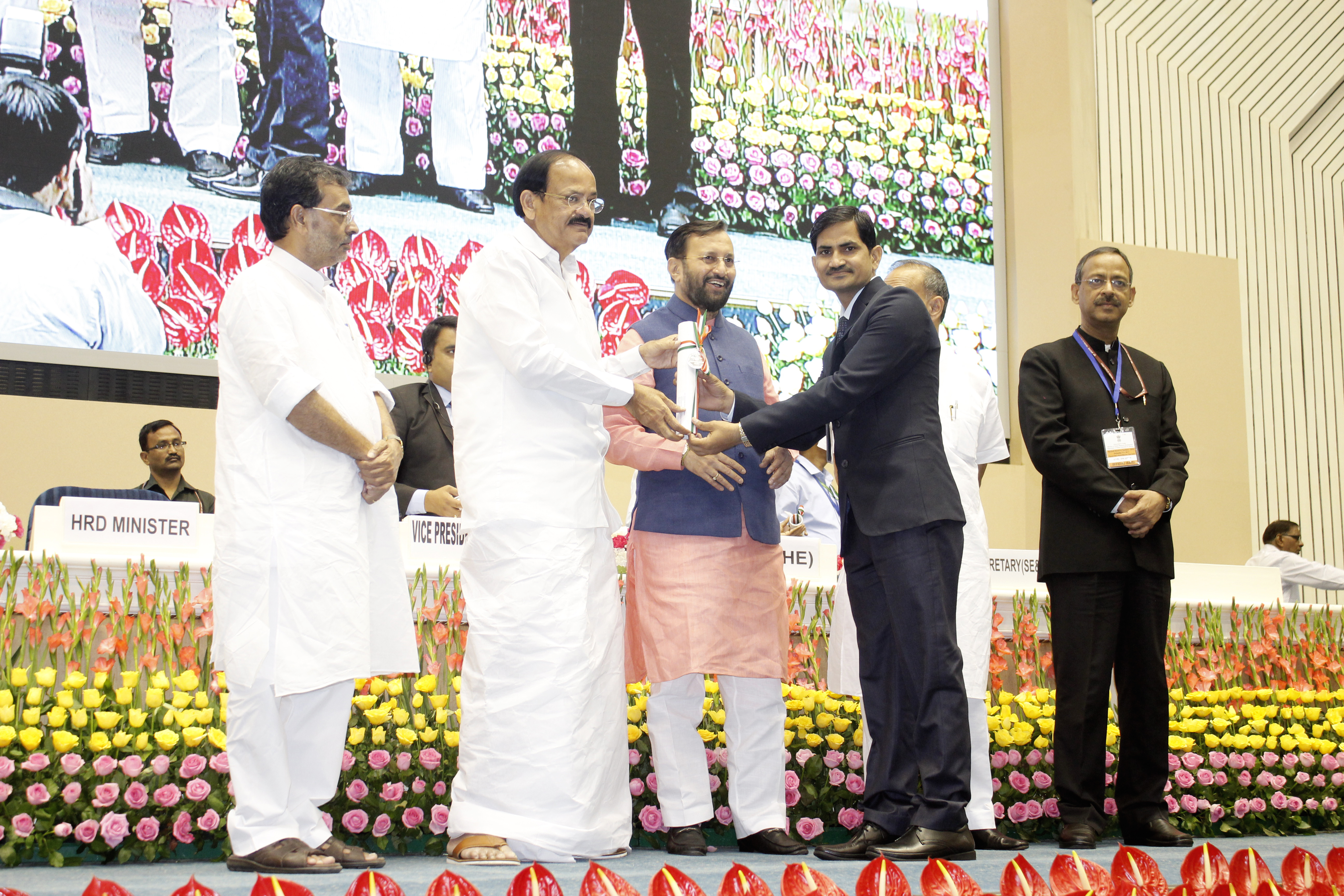
- Born: 5 December 1978 (age 47)
- Occupations: Teacher and App developer
- Known for: App development
- Spouse: Kashmiri Khan

Mohammad Imran Khan (born 5 December 1978) is an Indian teacher, Mobile app developer and educator from Alwar, Rajasthan. He is a mathematics teacher in the Sanskrit Education Department and a self-taught computer programmer. He has developed over 80 educational mobile applications and more than a hundred websites.

He garnered national attention after being mentioned by the Indian Prime Minister Narendra Modi in a speech at Wembley Stadium, London, in November 2015, where Modi said, "My India is in Imran Khan of Alwar.

== Early life and education ==
Khan, who is of Meo ethnicity, was born on 5 December 1978 in Khareda in the Alwar district of Rajasthan, India. When he was a student, Khan wanted to be a scientist. In 1999, Khan became a third-grade government teacher after completing a two-year teaching course. He worked in Kota for four years, before being transferred to Jaton Ka Bas.

== Career ==
=== Programming and App Development ===
Khan, who is self-taught, became proficient in programming and web development through online tutorials and the books left by his younger brother, who left for a job in Gurgaon after pursuing B.Tech. in Computer Science. He designed a general knowledge-related website in 2005. He was introduced to app development by Alwar's then district collector Ashutosh AT Pednekar. With 1 Million installs and 10k reviews, General Science in Hindi is the most-downloaded of Khan's apps.

A mobile application, Dishari created by Imran Khan, was launched by higher education minister Kiran Maheshwari 21 November 2017 . The app will help college students prepare for competitive exams (by providing free study materials) and also notify them of the same. The app will also provide latest updates and job alerts.

Digital Mewat App was launched in Mahavar Auditorium to create awareness of education in Mewat region, spread awareness, promote girl child education, eliminate social evils and create positive atmosphere.

Khan has donated all his applications to the Ministry of Human Resource Development (MHRD) as a patriotic contribution to Digital India. He has developed over fifty-two educational mobile applications and designed more than a hundred websites. Khan indicated that he would continue developing applications for other regional languages as well.

== Awards and Recognitions ==
=== Mention by Prime Minister of India ===
Narendra Modi, the Prime Minister of India, mentioned Khan during his speech at Wembley Stadium, London, in November 2015. Against a backdrop of news media debates about intolerance in India, Modi said that India is beyond news headlines and is much bigger than what people see on TV, adding, "My India resides in people like Imran Khan from Alwar". Khan expressed his happiness over Modi's admiration of his "small effort".

Soon afterwards, Khan was given free Internet service by Bharat Sanchar Nigam Limited. MHRD minister Smriti Irani tweeted that Khan has done a "stupendous job". Khan also received a call from the Minister of Communications and Information Technology Ravi Shankar Prasad, who congratulated him. Bharatiya Janata Party state president Ashok Parnami assured Khan of assistance with apps under development.

Rajasthan's Technical and Higher Education Minister Kali Charan Saraf gave Khan ₹11,000 (US$110). He also offered him the post of project officer in the Department of Science and Technology, but Khan "politely turned down" the offer. Mohammad Imran Khan has been selected for the Fulbright International Teacher Award 2022-23. This award is furnished by the US Government to 50 teachers around the world.

=== Bhamashah Award ===
Imran Khan was nominated for state-level Bhamashah award for giving up the copyright to 60 of his mobile apps on education and gifted the same to HRD ministry. The total estimated value of his apps are Rs 3.32 crores. Education Minister of Rajasthan Mr. Vasudev Devanani with Chairman of state assembly Mr. Kailash Meghwal awarded him in Birla Auditorium on 28 June 2016.

=== National ICT Award 2016 ===
Imran Khan is awarded by National ICT Award 2016 for his ICT activities in Education by President of India in Vigyan Bhawan on Teachers Day 5 September 2017.

=== National Award to Teachers 2018 ===
Imran Khan selected for National Award to Teachers 2017 by Govt of India for his innovative activities in Education. He was felicitated by Vice President of India in Vigyan Bhawan on Teachers Day 5 September 2018. Imran Khan devoted this Award to Students studying in Government schools of India.

=== Jamnalal Bajaj Award ===
Imran Khan was awarded by Jamnalal Bajaj Award 2019 for Outstanding Contribution in Application of Science & Technology for Rural Development. Foundation commemorates the birth anniversary of Shri Jamnalal Bajaj every year. As a tribute to the great man on this special occasion, the Foundation felicitated achievers in the field of humanitarian activities and Gandhian constructive programmes by presenting them with a Citation, a Trophy and a Prize amount of INR 10,00,000/- in each category. The Foundation continues to serve the ideals to which Shri Jamnalalji was dedicatedly been involved during his lifetime.

=== Fulbright Distinguished Awards in Teaching Program for International Teachers 2022-23 ===
Mohammad Imran Khan has been selected for the Fulbright International Teacher Award 2022-23. This award is furnished by the US Government.

=== Global Teacher Prize 2025 ===
Mohammad Imran khan was shortlisted for Global Teacher Prize 2025 for transforming rural education.

== Other works ==
=== Member of the technical advisory of NIELIT under the Ministry of Electronics and Information Technology ===
Union minister of state for law & Justice, electronics & IT P P Chaudhary has hired Mohammad Imran Khan as member of the technical advisory of an institute under the Ministry of Electronics and Information Technology (MeitY) to take this initiative forward. His services will benefit the National Institute of Electronics and Information Technology (NIELIT), the Human Resources Development (HRD) arm of the MeitY, which has decided to develop mobile applications for its wide range of services and courses.

=== Speech in LBSNAA ===
Imran Khan was invited by Lal Bahadur Shastri National Academy of Administration (LBSNAA) to address trainee IAS Officers of 2017 and 2018 batch. His topic of talk was Innovations.

=== TEDx Talk ===
Imran Khan joined TEDxRTU as speaker on 17 March 2018 at UIT Auditorium, Kota (Rajasthan).

=== Devvani App ===
Appguru Imran Khan created Devvani app for Sanskrit education, Chief Minister of Rajasthan e-launched the app. App contains e-content for self learning in form of Videos and topic wise Quizzes for class 3 to 12. To support students during the pandemic, Khan created a dedicated app for the Sanskrit Language. The app contains e-content in form of videos and quizzes for class 3 to 12 students.

=== Apps for Indian Education ===
Imran Khan developed PRASHAST App for Disability Screening for CIET-NCERT. It is a Disability Screening Checklist for Schools’ booklet and mobile app that covers 21 disabilities, including the benchmark disabilities as per the RPwD Act 2016. And, Geervani App for College students of Rajasthan Sanskrit Education, which is launched by Education Minister Dr. Bulaki Das Kalla.
