= Imran Ahsan Khan Nyazee =

Pakistani legal scholar (born 1945)

- Born: October 25, 1945 (age 80); Pakistan
- Education: International Islamic University
- Occupation: Islamic legal scholar
- Known for: Theories of Islamic Law

Imran Ahsan Khan Nyazee (عمران احسن خان نیازی; born 25 October 1945, Pakistan) is a Pakistani legal scholar who has taught at the International Islamic University Islamabad.

His Theories of Islamic Law has been described as laying the foundations for a 'new (Islamic) jurisprudence'.

His works include Theories of Islamic Law, in which Islamic legal theories have been presented from the perspective of comparative jurisprudence; Islamic Law of Business Organizations (Partnerships)—which discusses aspects of Islamic business law; Islamic Law of Business Organizations (Corporations)—a treatise on fictitious personality in the light of classical fiqh; The Concept of Riba in Islamic Banking and its sequel, Prohibition of Riba Elaborated as well as Murabaha and Credit Sale —all three of which are strong critiques of Islamic Banking.

== Academic career ==
Nyazee enrolled in the LLM program in Islamic law offered by the Faculty of Shariah and Law at International Islamic University, Islamabad. His teacher was Hussein Hamid Hassan, an expert in fatwas for Islamic finance.

== Theories ==
Some Western scholars suppose that Al-Shāfi'ī was the founder of Islamic legal theory and prior to his work, the Shafi'i theory, called uṣūl al-fikh or the 'common classical theory', Islamic law was based on personal opinion, that is, ra'y and Umayyad practice. Nyazee argues that the Shafi'i, championed by Al-Juwaynī, was accepted by Sunni schools of Islamic law but did not, however, determine their fiqh (positive doctrine or teachings). Rather, the fiqh dates to 132 Hijrah A.H., at least 50 years prior to the Shafi'i. Nyazee argues firstly, that due to its unique set of principles of interpretation, each school of Islamic law represents a theory of law unto itself. Secondly, he points out that Istiḥsān cannot be understood without understanding of the workings of qiyās. It is, therefore, difficult to accept that there was no system of interpretation before al-Shāfi‘ī's time. Thirdly, he concludes that the uṣūl al-fiqh never existed. Furthermore, Nyazee describes beyond the individual fikh of each school of law, another theory of interpretation called maqāṣid al-sharī‘ah (theory for the purpose of the sharī‘ah) which was developed by al-Ghazālī.

=== Cooperating spheres ===
The fiqh was based on a rigid analogical, method which required casuistry to bridge the divide between theory and practice. With this difficulty, the state resorted to secular legislation. In considering this divide between theory and practice, Nyazee reasoned that the theories of the schools were designed to stay close to the meaning of the texts of the Qur'an and the Sunnah, a religious imperative. The mission of the jurists, especially those inclined to literal interpretation of their texts, was to develop a theory of law which would remain unchanged over the long term. The fiqh of 132 A.H. was seen as this theory. It was accepted that the state would manage any practicalities the fiqh did not address while respecting the corps of the fiqh. Nyazee describes this arrangement as a 'doctrine of cooperating spheres': a fixed sphere that would never change, and a flexible sphere that would change with time and circumstances.

== Banking and business ==
Nyazee also proposes that all loans (except those of a charitable nature without a fixed period of repayment) and therefore all banking is prohibited and unIslamic. Nyazee is equally intolerant of murabaha, the Islamic system of business where in-put costs and mark-ups are made transparent between vendor and buyer. He argues riba will inevitably enter such transactions. He extends the prohibition to the creation of wealth on the basis of debt and the fractional reserve banking system. These elements along with zakat (the system of alms-giving) he says, are the differences between Islam and capitalism. He advocates the use of the gold and silver dinars and dirhams as the currency of the Muslim community.

== Rights ==
Nyazee conceives rights in three elements: those belonging to Allah and bestowed on all people (haqq); those related to the state, imam or a community of individuals (ḥuqūq al-‘ibād); and those of the individual (ḥaqq al-‘abd). He associates human rights and hudud with the rights of Allah and states those rights are integral to an Islamic community. Nyazee considers the areas of criminal law, ḥudūd, ta‘zīr and siyāsah in a similar fashion. The procedures used in conviction and sentencing relate to the three elements of rights.

== Select bibliography ==
- Theories of Islamic law: the methodology of Ijtihad.
- Islamic jurisprudence: usul al fiqh.
- Islamic law of business organizations (partnerships)
- Islamic law of business organizations (corporations)
- The concept of riba and Islamic banking
- Prohibition of riba elaborated
- Murabaha and credit sale.
- The distinguished jurist's primer. (a translation of Bidayat al-Mujtahid by Averroes)
- The book of revenue (a translation of Kitab al-Amwal by Abu Ubayd ibn Salam)
- The guidance. (a translation of Al-Hidayah)
- Reconciliation of the fundamentals of Islamic law.(a translation of Al-Muwafaqat by Al-Shatibi
