= Villains of Jasoosi Dunya =

A number of villains appear in Ibn-e-Safi's Jasoosi Dunya series.

== Notorious Criminals of Jasoosi Dunya ==
=== Leonard ===
Refers to "Faridi aur Leonard" and "Leonard ki Waapsi".

=== Jabar ===
Jabar first appears in Khatarnaak Boodha (Urdu: خطرناک بوڑھا) and Masnoo-ee Naak (Urdu: مصنوعی ناک). Jabar has an Indo-Germanic background and becomes a criminal to take revenge from the society. He used to be joyful when he was a kid. While he was growing up, his anger made him attracted towards the philosophy of Nazism. Jabar, then, decides to take revenge upon all those who inflicted pain in his life. He comes back to India to take care of several issues. Blackmail, imposture, murders, robberies, gold making, and a secret to live for hundreds of years are some of those interests.

He is also a chemist and a good scientist. During one of his experiments, steam from some chemical solution evaporated his nose. He uses an artificial nose to cover that small cave on his face. After Faridi caught him, Jabar killed himself in the courtroom using one of his own deadly poisons.

=== Gerald Shastri ===
Although a foreigner, Gerald Shashtri is a scholar of Sanskrit and an expert in Astrology and Hindu Philosophy. Apart from these apparent qualities, he is a great scientist who invents a process to transform men into huge gorillas in Jungle Ki Aag (جنگل کی آگ). He plans to rule the world with the help of his scientific achievements. Although Faridi manages to break his mob, he escapes and returns in Maut Ki Chataan (موت کی چٹان). His main captivating aspect is in his eyes. His eyes seem to be free from emotions and separated from face. His emotions are not expressed through his eyes; Hameed is scared of him on first seeing his eyes. His eyes are called as veeraan (ویران) by Ibne Safi, it seems you can see through them.

=== Theresia (T3B) ===
Theresia BumbleBee of Bohemia, first initiative her name used in famous Sholay Series (Flame Series) Jasoosi Dunya 56 to 59 Sholay Series.

=== Sung Hee ===
One of the most persistent, clever, daring, and disgusting villains created by Ibn-e-Safi, Sung Hee is one of the only two villains who has the honour of appearing and dueling with the heroes of both Jasoosi Dunya and Imran Series (the other being Theresa).

Sung Hee is an expelled Chinese felon who was forced to leave his country after a failed Coup d'état. Since then he moved from country to country and tried to avail any opportunity to display his criminal, lustful, and avaricious nature. Born to a Chinese father and Mongolian mother, he is very thin in appearance with a visibly weak physique, but in reality is extremely strong and tough. He is famous, among those who know him somewhat, as "Jonk" (leech) for his ability to clench his enemy to suffocation and unconsciousness.

Highly unreliable and erratic, Sung is one of those revolting individuals who commit crimes for the sake of entertainment. Assaulting innocent human beings is what he does when he gets bored though he never kills without reason. Not only that he enjoys breaking the law but he challenges the law enforcement while perpetrating crimes.

Although Imran, during his academic phase of life, was first to meet him, Sung's first documented encounter was with Faridi in Neeli Lakeer (The Blue Streak – #42). He mocks Faridi and gets slapped by Faridi so hard that he stumbles several steps across the room. Instead of displaying rage, he shrugs it off by saying that many bums have slapped him but it was an honour to have been smacked by such a reputable celebrity as Faridi. It is quite obvious that he kept his anger confined to fuel the hatred and vengeance for a more suitable event. Such was his control over his emotions that makes him even more dangerous.

Perhaps Sung Hee's most noticeable skill is his "Sung Art" of dodging bullets. Due to his very flexible and stretchable body, Sung Hee can easily dodge bullets fired at him from any reasonable distance. He observes the hand movement and direction of the firearm targeting him and escapes any injuries by performing prompt acrobatic movements.

Another reason of his for staying alive is that he also possesses a very awake, alert, and active mind. He changes strategies while executing one. He comes up with tricks and ideas that are hard to beat. Part of the reason that he could not be kept imprisoned for long is his quick backup schemes and arrangements.

Women are his only weakness to the extent that he cannot live without sex. Wherever he goes, he finds a companion for his solitude. Often he tried to run away from the scene as soon as a former 'acquaintance' shows up suddenly. He is also an "equal-opportunity" lover and, except for gender, does not discriminate because of religion, caste, nationality, age, and appearance. That is also the reason he is the "most wanted" person for a good spanking anytime anywhere.

Fans of the series love the interesting narrative between Sung Hi and Faridi or Imran. His relationship with Faridi is always that of a competitor. With Imran, however, his relationship has been known to change from friendly to friendly competitive to seriously competitive or notorious and unforgiving. Despite the fact that both characters are bloodthirsty for each other, the evil con man declares Imran to be his rightful nephew.

Sung Hee holds a deep respect for both Faridi and Imran and prefers to trap and use them rather than kill them. In "Khooni Bagolay" (The Bloody Whirlwinds – #45) Sing praises Faridi to his partner. Sung's feelings and respect for Imran are expressed very clearly when, despite a great risk to Sung's own life, he kills the supposed murderer of Imran in "Laraztee Lakeerein" (The Shivering Lines – #111).

He is accustomed to having multiple noteworthy opponents at a time. For example, in Jasoosi Duniya he had to contend with the brilliance of Faridi, the workings of Hameed and the betrayal of Finch. Fans believe that although Sung was defeated it was not without a valiant effort against three of the greatest heroes of Jasoosi Dunya. Similarly, he has had to deal with both Imran and Theresa at a time and has managed at times to come out on top. Remarkably, all this is done without the backing of any government or secret organisation, even though when he has joined hand with "Zeroland" and acted on its behalf for some span of time.

=== Dr. Salman ===
Dr. Salman is a psychologist by profession, and head of "Public Relations Bureau," an organisation that claims to help people combat their enemies by using psychological techniques. In reality though, he is the head of the most powerful mob "Taaqat" (Force), a group that is trying to bring revolution in the country. He is the villain of Ibne Safi's best Shoalaa stories: Pehla Shoalaa, Doosra Shoalaa, Teesra Shoalaa, and Jahannam Ka Shoalaa. With the help of his psychological techniques and strange inventions, he has created a new world underneath the earth. Breaking up Dr. Salman's mob is perhaps the most difficult task that Faridi faces in Jasoosi Duniya.

=== Finch ===
Refer to "Zahreele Teer", "Paani Ka Dhuan", "Laash Ka Qahqaha", and "Dr. Dred". Finch is criminal character but is not criminal by nature. Dr. dread, a criminal character of ibn e safi, has forced him. Finch is another villain of the Dr. Dread series. Finch was initially a circus man, a midget at only four and half feet. Still, he manages to extend his height to normal by using bamboos. He used to raise an orphan girl, but one night Dr. Dread's mob kidnaps her. The next day her dead body is found on the streets. From that day on, Finch becomes a criminal, creating his own gang to take revenge on Dr. Dread. Readers usually sympathise with Finch in his fight against Dr. Dread. While Faridi manages to break Dr. Dread's mob, Finch escapes. He later reappears in Chamkeela Ghubaar and Zehreela Sayaarah.

=== Toyoda ===
Refer to "Japan ka Fitna" and "Dushmano ka Shaihar".and "Lash ka bulawa".

=== Nanota ===
She is also known as Doosri Nagin. Refer to "Tabahi ka Khawab" and "Mohlik Shanasaee". Nanota is an agent of Zeroland. In "Chandnee Ka Dhua'n", she is in charge of a mission that is exploring a rare fuel, with plans of stealing it from the earth. This substance is thousand times lighter than normal gasoline, and can be used for space travel. Her beauty is so exquisite that Artist Jeelani's painting of her face wins the first award at "International Art Exhibition". Ibne Safi has developed Nanota's character in such a magical way that readers are puzzled, initially believing her to be some sort of spirit or otherworldly being. However, in the end she emerges as a human being, narrowly escaping Faridi's grip. She appears again after many years in Tabaahee Ka Khwaab and Muhlik Shanaasa'ee.

=== Qalandar Bayabani ===
Qalandar Bayabani is ironically a spy storywriter. He dictates novels to his secretary on a microphone from his closed office. This façade of his is initially developed in Saatwaan Jazeerah. However, it is revealed in Shaitaanee Jheel that he is actually a smuggler whose gang steals five tons of gold. When naval police try chasing them down, he hides the gold in a lake; then starts scheming to get it back. In the end, he manages to dodge Faridi. He reappears in Sehmee Hu'ee Larkee and Qatil Ka Haath. This time, however, he is unable to escape Faridi's grip.

=== Reema ===
She is also known as Teesri Nagin. Refer to "Khooni Raishay", "Teesri Nagan" and "Raigum Bala".

== See also ==
- Ibn-e-Safi
- Jasoosi Dunya
- Ahmad Kamal Faridi
- Sajid Hameed
- Faridi's Unofficial Aide
- List of Jasoosi Dunya by Ibn-e-Safi
