= List of Imran Series by Ibn-e-Safi =

Imran Series is the best-selling series of Urdu spy novels written starting from 1955 until his death in 1980 by Ibn-e-Safi.

Both Doctor Du'aa-goo and Jonk Ki Waapsi were published as a series of episodes in the Daily Hurriyat, and later published in the form of books by "Asraar Publications" (the regular publishers of Imran Series). Zehreelee Tasweer and Baebaakon Ki Talaash were then written in the continuity of Jonk ki Waapsi and were published by the above in book form. For this reason, these books are numbered at the end, otherwise they should not be considered "out of continuity".

Ali Imran and Safdar Saeed were also featured in a Jasoosi Dunya novel, Zameen K Baadal (#075/#035). This was the only novel in which Ibn-e-Safi brought Colonel Ahmad Kamal Faridi and Imran together but due to a highly heated response from fans, he never repeated the experiment.

Following is the complete list of 121 novels written by Ibn-e-Safi in Imran series. (Original number, original title (Roman), original title (Urdu), translated title in parentheses, year first published.)

1. Khaufnaak 'Imaarat (خوفناک عمارت) (The House of Fear) - 1955
2. Chattaanon Mein Fire (چٹانوں میں فائر) (Gunfire in the Rocks) - 1955
3. Pur-Asraar Cheekhain (پُراسرار چیخیں) (The Mysterious Screams) - 1955
4. Bhayaanak Aadmee (بھیانک آدمی) (The Dreadful Man) - 1956
5. Jahannam Ki Raqqaasah (جہنم کی رقاصہ) (The Dancer from Hell) - 1956
6. Neelay Parinday (نیلے پرندے) (The Blue Birds) - 1956
7. Saanpon K Shikaaree (سانپوں کے شکاری) (The Snake Hunters) - 1956
8. Raat Ka Shehzaadah (رات کا شہزادہ) (The Nocturnal Prince) - 1956
9. Dhoo'ain Ki Tehreer (دھوئیں کی تحریر) (The Scribblings in Smoke) - 1956
10. Larkiyon kaa Jazeerah (لڑکیوں کا جزیزرہ) (The Island of Women) - 1956
11. Patthar Kaa Khoon (پتھر کا خون) (The Blood of the Stone) - 1956
12. Laashon Ka Baazaar (لاشوں کا بازار) (The Corpse Market) - 1956
13. Qabr Aur Khanjar (قبر اور خنجر) (The Grave and the Dagger) - 1956
14. Aahnee Darwaazah (آہنی دروازہ) (The Iron Door) - 1956
15. Kaalay Charaagh (کالے چراغ) (The Dark Lamps) - 1956
16. Khoon K Pyaasay (خون کے پیاسے) (Bloodthirsty) - 1957
17. Alphonse (الفانسے) - 1957
18. Darindon Ki Bastee (درندوں کی بستی) (The Colony of Beasts) - 1957
19. Gumshudah Shahzaadee (گمشدہ شہزادی) (The Lost Princess) - 1957
20. Hamaaqat kaa Jaal (حماقت کا جال) (The Trap of Folly) - 1957
21. Shafaq K Pujaari (شفق کے پُجاری) (The Worshipers of Twilight) - 1957
22. Qaasid Ki Talaash (قاصد کی تلاش) (The Search for the Courier) - 1957
23. Raa'ee Ka Parbat (رائی کا پربت) (The Mountain of Rye) - 1957
24. Paagal Kuttay (پاگل کتے) (Mad Dogs) - 1957
25. Pyaasaa Samandar (پیاسا سمندر) (The Thirsty Ocean) - 1957
26. Kaalee Tasweer (کالی تصویر) (The Black Photograph) - 1957
27. Sawaaliyah Nishaan (سولیہ نشان) (The Question Mark) - 1958
28. Khatarnaak Laashein (خطرناک لاشیں) (The Dangerous Corpses) - 1958
29. Gaind Ki Tabaahkaaree (گیند کی تباہکاری) (The Destruction by the Ball) - 1958
30. Chaar Lakeerain (چار لکیریں) (4 Lines) - 1958
31. Chaalees-Aik-Baawan (چالیس ایک باون) (40-1-52) - 1958
32. Aatishdaan Ka Boot (آتشدان کا بُت) (The Statue at the Fireplace) - 1958
33. Jaron Ki Talaash (جڑوں کی تلاش) (The Search for the Roots) - 1958
34. Imraan Ka Aghwaa (عمران کا اغوا) (The Abduction of Imraan) - 1958
35. Zameen k Baadal (زمین کے بادل) (The Clouds of the Earth) - 1958 (Also featuring Colonel Ahmad Kamal Faridi)
36. Jazeeron Ki Rooh (جزیروں کی روح) (The Spirit of the Islands) - 1959
37. Cheekhtee Roohein (یختی روحیں) (The Screaming Spirits) - 1959
38. Khatarnaak Juwaaree (خطرناک جواری) (The Dangerous Gambler) - 1959
39. Zulmaat Ka Dewtaa (ظلمات کا دیوتا) (The Lord of Darkness) - 1959
40. Heeron Ka Faraeb (ہیروں کا فریب) (The Diamond Fraud) - 1959
41. Dilchasp Haadsah (دلچسپ حادثہ) (The Exciting Accident) - 1960
42. Bay-Aawaaz Sayyaarah (بے آواز سیارہ) (The Silent Planet) - 1960
43. Derh Matwaalay (ڈیڑھ متوالے) (1.5 Drunkards) - 1963
44. Billee Cheekhtee Hai (بلی چیختی ہے) (The Cat Screams) - 1964
45. Daaktar Du'aa-goo (ڈاکٹر دعا گو) (Doctor Beadsman/The Supplicating Doctor) - 1964
46. Jonk Ki Waapsi (جونک کی واپسی) (The Return of the Leech) - 1964
47. Zehreelee Tasweer (زہریلی تصویر) (The Toxic Portrait) - 1964
48. Baebaakon Ki Talaash (بیباکوں کی تلاش) (The Search for the Bold) - 1965
49. Lo-Bo Lee-Laa (لو بولی لا) (Come on, Say it) - 1965
50. Seh Rangaa Sho'lah (سہ رنگا شعلہ) (Tri-coloured Flame) - 1966
51. Aatishee Baadal (آتشی بادل) (The Fiery Cloud) - 1966
52. Geet Aur Khoon (گیت اور خون) (Song and Blood) - 1966
53. Doosri Aankh (دوسری آنکھ) (The Second Eye) - 1966
54. Aankh Sho'lah Banee (آنکھ شعلہ بنی) (Flaming Eyes) - 1967
55. Sugar Bank (شوگر بینک) - 1967
56. Taaboot Mein Cheekh (طابوت میں چیخ) (The Screams in the Casket) - 1968
57. Fazaa'ee Hangaamah (فضائی ہنگامہ) (The Aerial Commotion) - 1968
58. Tasweer Ki Uraan (تصویر کی اُڑان) (The Flight of the Painting) - 1968
59. Giyaarah November (گیارہ نومبر ) (11 November) - 1969
60. Minaaron Waaliyaan (میناروں والیاں) (The Ladies in the Towers) - 1969
61. Sabz Lahoo (سبز لہو) (Green Blood) - 196
62. Behree Yateem Khaanah (بحری یتیم خانہ) (The Marine Orphanage) - 1970
63. Paagalon Kee Anjuman (پاگلوں کی انجمن) (The Association of Lunatics) - 1970
64. Halaakoo & Co. (ہلاکو اینڈ کو) - 1970
65. Pahaaron K Peechay (پہاڑوں کے پیچھے) (Behind the Hills) - 1971
66. Buzdil Soormaa (بزدل سُورما) (The Coward Knight) - 1971
67. Dast-e-Qazaa (دستِ قضا) (The Hand of Fate) - 1972
68. Ashtray House (ایش ٹرے ہاوس) - 1972
69. 'Uqaabon K Hamlay (عقابوں کے حملے) (The Assault of the Eagles) - 1972
70. Phir Wahee Aawaaz (پھر وہی آواز) (That Voice Again) - 1972
71. Khoonraez Tasaadum (خونریز تصادم) (The Bloody Encounter) - 1972
72. Tasweer Ki Maut (تصویر کی موت) (The Death of the Painting) - 1973
73. King Chang (کنگ چانگ) - 1973
74. Dhoo'ein Ka Hisaar (دھوئیں کا حصار) (The Barrier of Smoke) - 1973
75. Samandar Ka Shigaaf (سمندر کا شگاف) (The Ocean's Crack) - 1973
76. Zalzalay Ka Safar (لزلے کا سفر) (The Journey of the Earthquake) - 1974
77. Blaek and White (بلیک اینڈ وہایٹ) - 1974
78. Naadeedah Hamdard (نادیدہ ہمدرد) (The Invisible Well-Wisher) - 1974
79. Adhoorah Aadmee (ادھورہ آدمی) (The Incomplete Man) - 1974
80. Operation Doublecross (آپریشن ڈبل کراس) - 1974
81. Khair Andesh (خیر اندیش) (The Well-Wisher) - 1974
82. Point Number Baarah (پوئنٹ نمبر بارہ) (Point No. 12) - 1974
83. Aidlaawaa (ایڈلاوا) (Ed Lava) - 1974
84. Bamboo Castle (بیمبو کیسل) - 1974
85. Ma'soom Darindah (معصوم درندہ) (The Innocent Beast) - 1974
86. Baegum X-2 (بیگم ایکس ٹو) (Mrs. X-2) - 1975
87. Shahbaaz Ka Basaeraa (شہباز کا بسیرا) (The Abode of the Hawk) - 1975
88. Raeshon Ki Yalghaar (ریسوں کی یلغار) (The Assault of the Fibres) - 1975
89. Khatarnaak Dhalaan (خطرناک ڈھلان) (The Perilous Slope) - 1975
90. Jungle Mein Mangal (جنگل میں منگل) (The Feast in the Jungle) - 1975
91. Teen Sankee (تین سنکی) (The 3 Lunatics) - 1975
92. Aadhaa Teetar (آدھا تیتر) (The Half Partridge) - 1975
93. Aadhaa Batair (آدھا بٹیر) (The Half Quail) - 1975
94. 'Allaamah Dehshatnaak (علامہ دہشتناک) (The Terrible Scholar) - 1976
95. Farishtay Ka Dushman (فرشتے کا دشمن) (The Foe of the Angel) - 1976
96. Baychaarah Shahzor (بیچارہ شہزور) (The Poor Antagonist) - 1976
97. Kaalee Kehkashaan (کالی کہکشاں) (The Dark Galaxy) - 1976
98. Seh Rangee Maut (سہ رنگی موت) (Tri-Coloured Death) - 1976
99. Mutaharik Dhaariyaan (متحرک دھاریاں) (The Animated Stripes) - 1976
100. Jonk Aur Naagin (جونک اور ناگن) (The Leech and the Female Serpent) - 1976
101. Laash Gaatee Rahee (لاش گاتی رہی) (The Corpse Kept on Singing) - 1976
102. Khushboo Ka Hamlah (خوشبو کا حملہ) (The Assault of the Fragrance) - 1976
103. Baabaa Sag-Parast (بابا سگ پرست) (The Old Dog-worshiper) - 1977
104. Mehektay Muhaafiz (مہکتے محافظ) (The Fragrant Guards) - 1977
105. Halaakat Khayz (ہلاکت خیز) (Deadly) - 1977
106. Zebra-Man (زیبرا مین) - 1977
107. Jungle Ki Sheheriyat (جنگل کی سہریت) (The Citizenship of the Jungle) - 1977
108. Mona Lisa Ki Nawaasee (مونا لیزا کی نواسی) (The Granddaughter of Mona Lisa) - 1977
109. Khoonee Fankaar (خونی فنکار) (The Bloody Artist) - 1977
110. Maut Ki Aahat (موت کی آہٹ) (The Sound of Death) - 1978
111. Doosraa Rukh (دوسرا رخ) (The Other Side) - 1978
112. Chattaanon Ka Raaz (چٹانوں کا راز) (The Secret of the Rocks) - 1978
113. Thandaa Sooraj (ٹھنڈا سورج) (The Cold Sun) - 1978
114. Talaash-e Gumshudah (تلاشِ گمشدھ) (In Search of the Missing) - 1979
115. Aag Ka Daa'irah (آگ کا دائرہ) (The Ring of Fire) - 1979
116. Laraztee Lakeerain (لرزتی لکیریں) (The Wavering Lines) - 1979
117. Patthar Ka Aadmee (پتھر کا آدمی) (The Man of Stone) - 1979
118. Doosraa Patthar (دوسرا پتھر) (The 2nd Stone) - 1979
119. Khatarnaak Ungliyaan (خطرناک انگلیاں) (The Dangerous Fingers) - 1979
120. Raat Ka Bhikaaree (رات کا بھکاری) (The Nocturnal Beggar) - 1980
121. Aakhree Aadmee (آخری آدمی) (The Last Man) - 1980

== See also ==
- Ibn-e-Safi
- Imran Series
- Ali Imran
- List of Jasoosi Dunya by Ibn-e-Safi
