= Imran Series (Mazhar Kaleem) =

Urdu spy novels by Pakistani author Ibn-e-Safi

Imran Series is a series of Urdu spy novels originally created by famous Pakistani author Ibn-e-Safi. More than two hundred writers illegally wrote on Imran Series including Mazhar Kaleem.

According to available record, Kaleem's first "Imran Series" novel was Maka Zonga, which was published by the name of "N Safi" in which he first introduced the character of Captain Shakeel, who was transferred from Military Intelligence. It was published in the late 1960s or early 1970s. Later on, around 1973 to 1975, "Jamal Publisher Bohar Gate, Multan" published his first novel by his pen name "Mazhar Kaleem". Each book in the series was a complete novel but some stories spanned over two or more books (for instance, Kaghzi Qayamat, Imran Ka Aghwa and others).

The character of Ali Imran is a playful yet deceiving personality. He is a bright young Oxford graduate with M.Sc. and Ph.D. degrees in chemistry. His comical and apparently incompetent persona hides his identity as head of a secret service. The Imran Series explains the workings of a country's Secret Service that operates from the capital of an imaginary country called Pakasia. Some other writers of Imran Series used the name of "Pakasia" in that era (1974–1975) such as, Shaheen Choudhary's novel that was published around 1974 or 1975. One of his novel name was "Pakasia ki Tabahi". Later on Mazhar Kaleem also used the word "Pakasia" in his novels. The Secret Service is administered by the Secretary of Foreign Affairs, Sir Sultan, who offers Imran the designation of the Secret Service's head soon after getting personal help from him.

These novels were published by "Yousuf Brothers", from Multan.

== Characters created by Mazhar Kaleem ==
Mazhar Kaleem acquired fame through writing about Ibn-e-Safi's famous character in the Imran Series in the late 1960s. After Ibn-e-Safi, many writers tried to continue "Imran series" but few have lasted beyond a few novels except Kaleem. He has now written over five hundred novels. He has brought some new characters to the "Imran Series" and wrote various topics like mystic crimes (Misaal-e-Dunya) and economic crimes (Kaghazee Qiyamat). Imran Series has a range of diverse, colorful, and sentient characters. Few Character created by Mazhar Kaleem are mentioned below:-

- Captain Shakeel
- Tiger
- Juanna
- Saliha
- Natran
- CHIEF SHAGAL
- Rozi Rascal

== Books from Yousuf Brothers ==
This is the complete list of his novels of Imran Series published under the banner of Yousuf Brother from Multan.

1. Maka Zonga
2. Sabolate Aager
3. Shogi Pama
4. Double White
5. Kaya Palat
6. Shalmaak
7. Bagop
8. Khamoash Cheikhein
9. Calendar Killer
10. Ganja Bhikari
11. Blue Film
12. Ladies Secret Service (Imran Fareedi Series)
13. Operation Desert One
14. Black Prince
15. Doug Rays (Imran Fareedi Series)
16. Basashi
17. Silver Girl
18. Rascal's King
19. Aika Baan
20. Hara Kari
21. Nakabel-e-Taskheer Mujrim Part 1 (Israel mission)
22. Mout ka Raqs Part 2 (Israel mission)
23. Weather Boss
24. Imran Ki Mout
25. Zinda Saye
26. Black Feather
27. Dashing Three
28. Rangeen Mout
29. Bloody Sandicate
30. Dehshat Gard
31. Mutaharrik Mout
32. Red Medosa
33. Danger Land
34. Cross Club
35. Fohaag International
36. Fast Action
37. Prince of Dhamp
38. Bejurm Mujram
39. Blue Eye
40. Ankana
41. Escape Gray
42. Prince Vinchal
43. Operation Sandwich Part 2 (Sandwich Plan)
44. X-2
45. Kaghzi Qiyamat Part 1
46. Kaghzi Qiyamat Part 2
47. Lady Eagles Part 1
48. Lady Eagles Part 2
49. Topaz Part 1
50. Topaz Part 2 (Yakini Mout)
51. Anari Mujrim
52. Hi-Fi
53. Ghaddar Julia
54. Karvan-e-Dehshat Part
55. Karvan-e-Dehshat Part
56. Jayalay Jasoos Part
57. Jayalay Jasoos Part
58. Camp Reckers Part 1
59. Camp Reckers Part 2
60. Wild Tiger
61. Pakishia Club
62. Adhura Formula Part 1
63. Adhura Formula Part 2
64. Robin HUD
65. Diamond of Death
66. Bankay Mujram
67. Top Rock Part
68. Top Rock Part
69. Julia Fight Group Part 1
70. Julia Fight Group Part 2
71. Power Land Part
72. Power Land Part
73. Jauana in Action Part 1
74. Jauana in Action Part 2
75. Star Track Part 1
76. Star Track Part 2
77. Little Devils
78. Face of Death Part1
79. Face of Death Part 2
80. Black Death Part3
81. Black Death Part 4
82. Hot Knot Part1 & Part2
83. Special Agent Brono
84. Red Chief
85. Death Circle
86. Trinch Fire
87. Shooting Power
88. Dark Club
89. Halka Mout Part1
90. Halka Mout Part2
91. Way To Action Part1
92. Way To Action Part2
93. Top Target
94. Lancer Five Part1 & Part2
95. Agent from Power Land
96. Road Side Story
97. Great Fight
98. Black Kalaar
99. Wonder Plan Part1 & Part2
100. Death Group
101. Hekal Sulemani Part 1 & Part 2 (Israel mission)
102. Lady Sunderta Part1 & Part2
103. Lady Killers
104. Saajan Center
105. Red Power
106. Power Land Ki Tabahi
107. Juliana Top Action
108. Challenge Mission
109. Pressure Lock
110. One Man Show
111. Ladies Mission Part1 & Part2
112. Foul Play Part1 & Part2
113. Zero over Zero Part1 & Part2
114. Super Agent Safdar Part1 & Part2
115. Blood Hounds
116. Easy Mission
117. Light House
118. Secret Service Mission
119. Four Corners Part1 & Part 2 (Imran Fareedi Series)
120. Silver Hands
121. Adventure Mission
122. Golden Sand Part 1, Golden Sand Part 2
123. Rebite Part1 & Part2
124. Jasoos-e-Azam
125. Red Point
126. Alert Camp Part1 & Part2
127. Tight Plan (Israel mission)
128. Dashing Agent Part1, Dashing Agent Part2
129. Inventory Grip Part1
130. Inventory Grip Part2
131. Camp Fight
132. Birth Stone
133. Wood King
134. Top Rise
135. Supreme Fighter
136. Nawashingu
137. Water Power Part1
138. Water Power Part2 (Great Ball)
139. Water Power Part3 (Great Victory)
140. Water Power Part4 (Black Pagos)
141. Dogo Fighters Part1 & Part2
142. Sacret Heart
143. True Man
144. Action Group Part1 & Part2
145. Barki
146. Well Done
147. Special Plan
148. Desert Commandos
149. Blood Rays Part1
150. Blood Rays Part2
151. Heli Kat
152. Kareka
153. Red Dot
154. Logasa Mission
155. Last Fight Part1 & Part2
156. Flaster Project Part1 & Part2
157. Night Fighters
158. Karosho
159. Hard Mission Part1 & Part2
160. Hollow Wall Part1 & Part2
161. Sarto Mission Part Sarto Mission Part
162. Super Mind Agent Part1 & Part2 (Black Thunder Series)
163. Zarak
164. Bright Stone
165. Zero Lastri Part1 & Part2 (Mysticism Series)
166. Texaat Part Texaat Part
167. Jim Might
168. Long Fight Part1 & Part2
169. Big Boss Part1 & Part2
170. Boganu Part
171. Boganu Part
172. Last Round
173. Third Force Part1 & Part2
174. Fyland Part1 & Part2
175. Black Agents
176. Bloody Game
177. Cross Mission Part1 & Part2
178. S S Project Part1 & Part2 (Mushkbar Mission)
179. Destruction Plan Part1, Destruction Plan Part2
180. Black Hounds Part1, Black Hounds Part2
181. Super Mission
182. Spot Game
183. Hisrat-ul-Arz
184. Black Hills Part1 & Part2
185. Tatar Daggers Part1
186. Snake Circle Part1
187. Black Strip Part1 & Part2
188. Special Ply
189. Hot Field Part1 & Part2
190. Hot Spot Part3 & Part4
191. Hot Fight Part5 & Part6
192. Saqaab Project Part1 & Part2
193. San Kara
194. Misali Duniya (Mysticism Topic)
195. Red Ring
196. Blind Attack Part1 & Part2
197. Open-Close Part 1, Open-Close Part 2
198. Black World Part1 & Part 2 (Mysticism Series)
199. Black Powers Part3 & Part4 (Mysticism Series)
200. Kakana Island Part 1
201. Golden Agent Part1 & Part2 (Black Thunder Series)
202. Golden Agent in Action Part1 & Part2(Black Thunder Series)
203. Four Stars Part 1 & Part 2 (Four Stars Mission)
204. Code Walk Part1 & Part2
205. Blasters
206. Special Section
207. Royal Service Part1 & Part2
208. Ladies Island Part1 & Part2
209. Double Game Part1 & Part2
210. Funk Syndicate Part1 & Part2
211. Fighting Mission Part1 & Part2
212. Dog Crime (Four Stars Mission)
213. Dushman Julia
214. Zigzag Mission Part1 & Part2 (Imran Fareedi Series)
215. Saffaak Mujrim (Four Stars Mission)
216. Red Craft
217. Stalks Part1 & Part2
218. Death Quick Part1 & Part2
219. Tower Section Part1 & Part2
220. Long Bird Complex Part1 & Part2 (Israel mission)
221. Long Bird Sealed Complex Part1 & Part2 (Israel mission)
222. Blasting Station Part1 & Part2 (Mushkbari Series)
223. Sasic Center Part1 & Part2
224. Black Crime Part1 & Part2 (Four Stars Series
225. Last Upset Part1 & Part2 (Mushkbari Series)
226. Safli Duniya Part1 & Part 2 (Mysticism Series)
227. Prince Kachan Part1 & Part2
228. Rosy Rascal
229. Rock Head (Four Stars Mission)
230. Imran Ka Aghwa Part1 & Part2
231. Spargo Part1 & Part2
232. Diamond Powder Part1 & Part2
233. Tafreehi Mission Part1 & Part2
234. Treaty Part1 & Part2
235. Green Death Part1 7 Part 2 (Imran Fareedi Series)
236. Power Agent Part1 & Part2
237. Makruh Mujrim part 1 & Part 2 (Four Stars Mission)
238. Dark Mission Part1 & Part2
239. Base Camp Part1 & Part2 (Mushkbar Mission)
240. Zaheen Agent
241. Red Zero Agency
242. J S P Part1 & Part2
243. Jinnati Duniya (Mysticism Series)
244. Death Rays
245. Golden Spot Part1 & Part2
246. Grass Dam Part1 & Part2
247. Black Face Part1 & Part2
248. Double Mission Part1 & Part2
249. Shedog Part1 & Part2
250. Shedog Headquarter Part1 & Part2
251. Red Authority Part1 Part 2 (Israel mission)
252. Lasilky
253. Dark Eye Part1 & Part2
254. Snake Killers
255. Shudarmaan Part1 & Part2 (Mysticism Series)
256. Sea Egale Part1 & Part2
257. Agrosaan
258. Cosmic Star Part1 & Part2
259. Red Army Part1 & Part2
260. Red Army Network Part1 & Part2
261. Red Flag
262. Pearl Pirate
263. Makruh Chehrey (Four Stars Mission)
264. Crown Agency
265. Faban Society Part1 & Part2
266. Last Movement
267. Smart Mission
268. Super Master Group
269. Thread Ball Mission
270. Fort Dam
271. Fayougi Task
272. Hanging Death
273. Villago Part1 & part 2 (Mysticism Series)
274. Black Arrow
275. Jewish Channel (Israel mission)
276. Black Hawks Part1 & part 2 (Israel mission)
277. Power Squad (Israel mission)
278. Electronic Eye
279. Karakoon
280. Special Mission Part1 & Part2
281. Black Mask
282. C Top
283. Water Missile
284. Target Mission
285. Foregion Group
286. Makarno Sandicate
287. Karkis Point
288. Flower Syndicate
289. Taroot Part1 & Part 2 (Mysticism Series)
290. High Victory Part1
291. High Victory Part2 (Final Fight)
292. Starg Part1 & Part2
293. Rodix
294. Partin (Israel mission)
295. Sagaan Mission Part1
296. Sagaan Mission Part2 (X-V File)
297. Sagaan Mission Part3 (Red Top) Sagaan Mission Part (K.G.B. Headquarter)
298. Taaraak Part1 & Part2
299. Double Lock
300. Torson Agency
301. Large View Project Part1 & Part2
302. Soft Mission Part1
303. Soft Mission Part2 (Hard Re-Back)
304. Broad System
305. Muslim Curruncy Part1 & Part2
306. Cat Rat Game Part1 & Part2
307. Suspense Game Part3 & Part4
308. Mamar (Mysticism Topic)
309. Bright Eye
310. Star Mission
311. Last Warning
312. White Shadow
313. S Three
314. Shooter
315. Black Thunder Section Part1 & Part2 (Black Thunder Series)
316. Sawana
317. Cotton Seed
318. Hot Rays
319. Domnaai (Mysticism Topic)
320. Harch
321. Big Challenge Part1 & Part2
322. Great Mission Part1 & Part2
323. Zero Mission
324. Red Circle
325. Mind Blaster Part1 & Part2
326. Crossing Arrow
327. Last Trap
328. Maha Pursh Part1 & Part 2 (Mysticism Series)
329. Kashaam (Mysticism Topic)
330. Mariya Section Part1 & Part2
331. Black Fighters (Israel mission)
332. Mushkbari Code (Mushkbar Mission)
333. Zero Blaster
334. Capital Agency
335. Prince Shama
336. Business Crime(Four Stars Mission)
337. Mission Sagor
338. Gleri Seedia
339. Blue Code Book Part Blue Code Book Part
340. Big Dam
341. Sagraam Mission
342. Dodging Mission
343. Beggers Mafia (Four Stars Mission)
344. Free Socks
345. Chief Agent Part1 & Part2
346. Dark Face Part1 & Part2
347. Top Secret Mission
348. Black Day

== Books from Khan Brothers ==
Mazhar Kaleem MA has now started his new publication known as '’Khan Brothers'’. In which he publishes his new 'Imran Series. The list of his new books are:

1. Rosy Rascal Mission
2. Devil's Pearl (Mysticism Series)
3. Secret Center
4. Blind Mission
5. Blue Hawks
6. Tiger In Action (Israel mission)
7. Saarj Agency
8. Saarj Headquarter
9. Target Imran
10. Black Head
11. Winning Party
12. Blue Bird Group
13. Group Fighting
14. Black Scarab (Mysticism Series)
15. Hard Crime (Four Stars Mission)
16. Hawk Eye
17. Danger Group Chow
18. Fast Mission
19. One To One
20. Kaali Duniya (Mysticism Series)
21. Special Station
22. Jewish Power (Israel mission)
23. Multi Mission
24. Two in One (Israel mission)
25. Golden cross
26. Fight plus
27. Hot World (Special Number)
28. E-City
29. Green Guard
30. Reverse Circle
31. Violent Crime(Four Stars Mission)
32. Side Track
33. Taghooti Duniya(Mysticism Series)
34. Blank Mission
35. Golden Colok {Four Stars Mission}
36. Cyrus
37. Grand Victory
38. Twin Sisters
39. Action Agency
40. Top Mission (Special# Black Thunder Series)
41. Crowg (Mysticism Series)
42. Peacock
43. Casper Rays
44. Aarmis Parohit (Mysticism Series)
45. Hard Agency
46. White Birds (Special Number)
47. Red Sky
48. Multi Target
49. Black Day (Four Stars Mission)
50. Great Falls
51. Karman Mission
52. Black Sun
53. Lime Lite
54. Sangeen Jurm
55. Master Laboratory
56. Lords
57. Rockfield
58. Fugoshay
59. Shogran Mission
60. Salaaska
61. Danger Mission
62. Swodmaga
63. Top Shoot
64. Hard Target
65. Cobran
66. Marshal Agency
67. Code Box
68. Tawaan
69. Total Zero
70. Super Agents
71. Top Section
72. Water Lite
73. D Group
74. Black Business
75. Black Crown
76. Top Headquarter
77. Shaitan Ke Pujari
78. Supreme Force
79. Asadome
80. Double Targate
81. Top Victory
82. kallinga Mission
83. Half Mission
84. Sporgan
85. Double Dodge
86. Dark Heart
87. Syral
88. Scarm
89. Final Game
90. Special Force
91. Master Mission

== See also ==
- Imran series characters
- Ali Imran
