= Mazhar Kaleem =

Pakistani novelist

- مظہر کلیم ایم اے
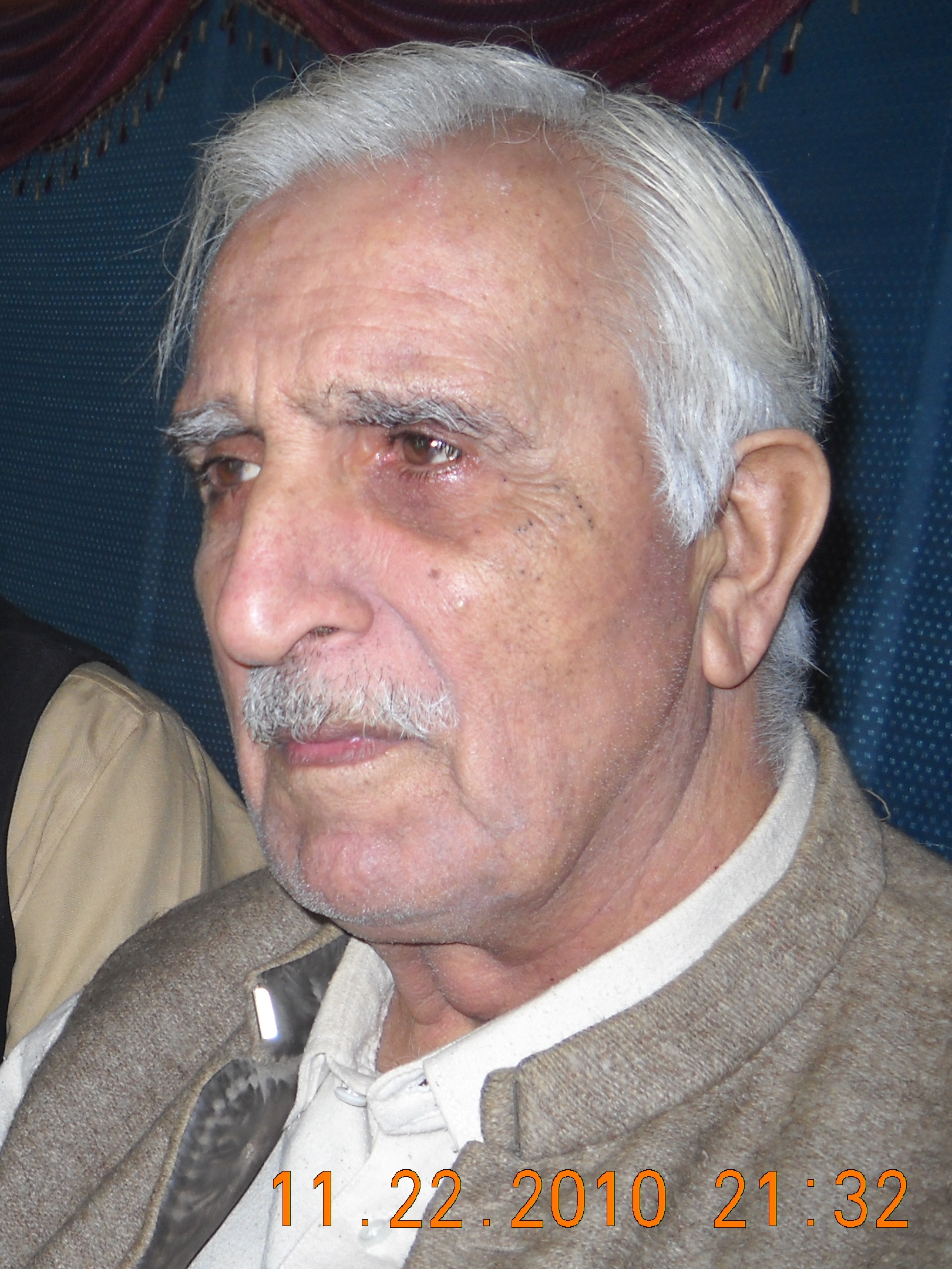
- Born: 22 July 1942; Kiri Afghanan, Multan, Pakistan
- Died: 26 May 2018 (aged 75); Multan, Pakistan
- Occupations: Lawyer, novelist, Anchorperson
- Writing career
- Period: 1968 – 2018
- Genre: Detective Stories
- Notable works: Naqabile Taskheer Mujrim; Khamosh Cheekhain; Kaghazi Qayamat; Tiger In Action

Mazhar Kaleem (Urdu: مظہر کلیم) (2018 – 1942) original name Mazhar Nawaz Khan was a Pakistani novelist chiefly known for writing Imran Series, Urdu spy fiction within the Imran Series mythos created by Ibn-e-Safi.

Besides Imran Series, he was also known for writing short stories for children. He was the anchorperson of a Saraiki radio talk show from Radio Pakistan's Multan center, "Jamhoor-de-Awaz" ("The People's Voice"). He was a lawyer who was elected Senior Vice-President of Multan Bar Council.

In "his writing career of over five decades, he has written around 600 spy fiction novels on Ibn-e-Safi Imran Series", as well as "around 5000 short stories (not confirmed) for children including the famous series of Umro Aiyyar."

== Biography ==
Mazhar was born to Hamid Yar Khan, a police officer. He did his B.A. from Emerson College and did M.A. (Urdu) from the Multan Campus of Punjab University. Mazhar Kaleem was born on 22 July 1942 in Multan. His father Hamid Yar Khan was a retired police Inspector. He belonged to a Pathan family, "Muhammad Zai" in Multan, who settled in Multan after migrating from Afghanistan in the late 19th century. His original name is Mazhar Nawaz Khan; however he is now only known as his literary pen name, Mazhar Kaleem Khan.

He studied in Islamia High School Multan and graduated from Emerson College (Current Government College) . He was a color holder in basketball and bodybuilding from Emerson College. After graduating he taught as a master in a government high school, Daulat Gate, but he left it to pursue more studies at the University of Multan (currently Bahauddin Zakariya University) to do his M.A. in Urdu Literature and LL.B. He was a senior lawyer in Multan Bench of Lahore High Court. Professionally he was a lawyer and not a novelist which was his part-time hobby. He was also anchor person of a radio talk show from Radio Multan. His original name is Mazhar Nawaz Khan while Kaleem is his literary adoption. He had two sons and four daughters but his eldest son Faisal Jan died at the age of 31. The second son Fahad Usman Khan is working in a Multinational Bank.

After Ibn-e-Safi, more than three hundred writers wrote novels on his characters without Ibn Safi's permission. S. Qureshi, MA Sajid, MA Pirzada, Mazhar Kaleem, Safdar Shaheen, Zaheer Ahmed, etc. wrote the Imran series in a similar style. All of them also used all the characters of Ibne Safi.

== Works ==
He has written over five hundred books in Imran Series both mystery long and short novels of Imran Series and short stories for children.

== Stories ==
- Action Agency
- Basashi
- Be Jurm
- Black Sun
- Black Feather
- Blue Eye
- Double White
- Dus Crore May Dou Shetaan
- Fohag International
- Gang war
- Hawk Eye
- HaaraKari
- Kamran Mission
- Limelight
- Sabolat
- Safli Dunya
- Shogi Pama
- Silver Girl
- Terntola
- Weather boss
- Asadam
- Chief Agent
- Dashing Agent

== See also ==
- Imran Series By Mazhar Kaleem
- Pakishia Secret Service
