= MA Rahat =

Pakistani writer

Marghoob Ali Rahat
- Born: 1941; Karachi, British India
- Died: 24 April 2017 (aged 75–76); Lahore, Pakistan
- Occupation: Writer
- Notable work: Sadiyon ka beta

Marghoob Ali Rahat popularly known as M.A. Rahat was a Pakistani writer. He died at the age of 76. He used different pen names and wrote thousands of novels and hundreds of books on various topics for Urdu digests.

Rahat started writing in 1963 with the famous Imran Series and Jasoosi Duniya Detective World 'Fareedi Hameed Series', created by Ibn-e-Safi.

== Works ==
He authored over 700 novels using various pseudonyms, such as Najma Safi, Naghma Safi, Najam Safi, N Safi, etc. This includes the Imran series and Jasoosi Duniya.

His notable works include:

- 100 Saal Pehle
- Aasaib
- Aasaib Nagri
- Aatish
- Aazaad Qaidi
- Ajaib Khana
- Akal Sagar
- Akhri Saboot
- Aks
- Anmol
- Apsara
- Asli Waris
- Baaghi
- Baazi
- Band Aankhen
- Bangroo
- Barood Ke Phool
- Barzakh
- Bay Badan
- Bhonchal
- Bicchoo
- Chipkali
- Daayan
- Daldal
- Dasht e Wehshat
- Dehshat Kada
- Devi Ki Hukoomat
- Diwali
- Doobte Chand Ke Pujari
- Doosra Tabaq
- Dushman Roohain
- Firon
- Gardaab
- Golmaal
- Green Force
- Hamalia
- Hisaar
- Ilzaam
- Iqbal e Jurm
- Jaadugar
- Jaanbaaz
- Jalan
- Jazbaat
- Jharne (unfinished)
- Jinn Zaada
- Kaainaat
- Kaala Jaadu
- Kaalay Chiragh
- Kaalay Ghaat Wali
- Kaali Devi Ka Mandir
- Kaali Dunya
- Kaath Ka Ullu
- Kafan Posh
- Kalay Raaste
- Kali Qabar
- Kalka Devi
- Kamand
- Khauf
- Khilaadi
- Khoon Asham
- Khud Parast
- Lawa
- Maazi Ke Jazeeray
- Masoom Churail
- Meetha Zehar
- Muqaddas Ahd
- Muqaddas Nishan
- Naag Devta
- Naag Nagar Ki Nageena
- Neel Mehal Ki Raqasa
- Nirwan Ki Talash
- Nitika
- Parchayan
- Pazeb
- Pujari
- Rampur Ka Lakshman
- Rangeen Kehkashan
- Rooh K Shikari
- Roop Kund Ki Roopa
- Saaya
- Sadiyon Ka Beta
- Sadiyon Ka Musafir
- Sadiyon Ka Sehar
- Sadiyon Ki Beti
- Samandar Ka Beta
- Sandal Ka Taboot
- Sarab
- Sarfarosh
- Sazishon Ke Jaal
- Shamoon
- Shehteer
- Shehzor
- Shiblees
- Sholay
- Sookhay Gulab
- Sunehri Jonk
- Sunehri Taboot
- Taloot
- Tareek Waadi
- Tarkash
- Tarsol Kund Ki Dasi
- Tashna Tan
- The Black Channel
- The Black Temple
- Tilism Zadi
- Titli
- Unchi Uraan
- Wadi Al-Maut
- Wehshat Zaade
- Wehshi
- Zehreela
- Zinda Murda
- Zinda Sadiyan
