= The House of Fear (novel) =

Book by Ibn-e-Safi

- First edition cover
- Author: Ibn-e-Safi
- Language: English
- Series: Imran Series
- Genre: Crime
- Publisher: Random House
- Publication date: June 2010
- Publication place: Pakistan
- Media type: Print (Paperback)
- Pages: 256
- ISBN: 81-8400-097-9

The House of Fear is the first English translation of the Ibn-e-Safi's much celebrated Urdu novel Khaufnaak Imaraat that was first published in 1955. It is published by Random House and translated by Bilal Tanweer. It also carries another novella Shootout at the Rocks. Both feature the stock character Imran, Ibn-e-Safi, whose actual name was Asrar Narvi, wrote about 122 novels under this Imran Series. In the first story, the protagonist finds dead people in an empty house with three knife wounds each placed at exactly five inches. The hero who is considered an idiot by his secret-service colleagues solves the case in his own unique way between poetic recitations of Ghalib and praises of Indian film heroines. In the second story, a colonel called Zargham receives mysterious wooden animal-shaped toys, that we find later, are signature of Li Yu Ka, a two hundred years old brotherhood of deadly killers, and very soon the man is the thick of big trouble from which only the legendary Imran can be of any help.

The book cover has a controversial quotation by Agatha Christie that claims that the mystery queen acknowledged Safi's monopoly over originality in the genre.
