= Imran series =

Urdu spy novel series

The Imran Series (Urdu عمران سیریز) is an Urdu spy fiction novel series created by Pakistani writer Ibn-e-Safi. Ali Imran is the pivotal character, a comical secret agent who controls the secret service as X-2 but appears to work as just another member of the secret service. Except for a handful of people, no one knows his status as the chief of the service.

The first novel of Imran series, Khaufnaak Imarat (The House of Fear) or (The Terrifying Building), (recently translated and published as The House of Fear by Random House, India) was published in October 1955. In early books Imran appears as a solo detective, but in the ninth book, Dhuaen ki Tehreer (The Scribbling in Smoke), he is portrayed as the chief of secret service as X-2. The same novels of Ibn-e-Safi are being published in new editions.

Humour, mystery, suspense, and psychology are the essence of Ibn-e-Safi's books. Ibn-e-Safi wrote 121 books of Imran Series and 124 books of Jasoosi Dunya "Detective World" 'Fareedi Hameed Series'. Before creating the Imran Series in August 1955, Ibn-e-Safi created Jasoosi Dunya 'The Detective World' 'Fareedi Hameed Series' in March 1952 and continued to write until his death in 1980.

Ibn-e-Safi created Imran Series and Jasoosi Duniya "Spy World 'Fareedi & Hameed Series' and Ibn-e-Safi is the best Imran Series writer. Both series created by him reached the peak of popularity. His character are famous in subcontinent and internationally. More than two hundred fake writers of Imran Series such as N Safi, Najma Safi, Naghma Safi, Aban Safi, H Iqbal, S Qureshi, MA Rahat, Azhar Kaleem, Ibn-e-Kaleem, Mazhar Kaleem, Safdar Shaheen etc. used the popularity of Imran Series and Jasoosi Duniya for themselves.

== Overview ==
Following the footsteps of the first best-selling series, Jasoosi Dunya, this series features Ali Imran – a playful, yet deceiving personality. He is a bright young Oxford graduate with MSc and PhD degrees in chemistry. His comical and apparently incompetent persona hides his identity as head of a secret service. This series has been widely acclaimed for its literary quality and character development.

Imran Series explains the workings of a country's secret service that operates from the capital of the country (supposed by many to be Karachi in Pakistan which was the capital when initial Imran Series novels were written. Although Ibn-e-Safi was careful to never explicitly state this, villains often refer to the country as the "one from South Asia"). The Secret Service is administered by the Secretary of Internal Affairs, Sir Sultan, who offers Imran the position as its head after getting personal help from him in Raat ka Shahzadah (The Prince of Night – #8).

== Ali Imran ==
Ali Imran is a pivotal character in Imran Series. Handsome and bright, the young-man holds MSc, and PhD degrees from Oxford University and has extraordinary sex appeal. He always appears comical and moronic, using these features to camouflage himself as one of the stupidest men. Always shown acting stupid, insane, and funny, he keeps the readers in hysterics at his every action. He never reveals his true side to anyone. He usually dresses eccentrically; for example, a pink coat, a light green shirt, a yellow necktie, white pants, and a purple flat hat with a red rose in it is his typical apparel. Ibne Safi refers to this as Imran's "Technicolor Outfit."

Imran is son of Amma Bi and Mr. Abdul-ur-Rahman, director general of the Central Intelligence Bureau and as being from Genghis Khan's bloodline, he has Mongol lineage. He resides in an apartment with his two most trusted assistants: Sulaiman, the cook, and Joseph Mugunda, his bodyguard. He is, most of the time, seen driving a two-seater sports car.

Imran purposefully keeps multi facets to his personality. As Imran—Ali Imran—he acts as an opportunist who can turn either a police informer or a blackmailer as the situation demands. A perfect cover to his profession. His other most significant personality facet is the Chief of the Secret Services: X-2. Only three other characters know his secret: Sir Sultan, Secretary of the Ministry of Internal Affairs; "Black Zero," or Tahir, who acts as X-2 in Imran's absence; and Roshi, a long time friend and a trusted partner. The other two personalities Imran assumes now and then are the Prince of Dhump, a warlord of a fictitious state known as Dhump, and Rana Tahavvar Ali Sandooqui, a wealthy landlord and businessman.

Imran works as a normal member of the Secret Service and none of the other members had a slightest clue of his being their chief officer. These agents usually laugh him off and sneer at him, but as X-2, they really dread him. Imran's favourite agent is Safder Saeed. Imran has perfected the art of dodging bullets. It is called "Sing Art," which he learns from an international Chinese criminal, Sing Hee. Imran calls him Uncle Sing (Chacha Sing) and in return, Sing Hee refers him as nephew. His another old time foe is T3B, Theresia Bumble-Bee of Bohemia. Theresia has a great crush on him but Imran hardly pay heed to her rather jeer at her sentiments.

He, like Col. Ahmad Kamal Faridi, has impregnable character vis-à-vis women. Due to his naive appearance and innocent looks, women are smitten with him, but he usually gives them a cold shoulder.

== Other characters ==
One of Ibn-e-Safi's notable strengths as a writer was his ability to create and develop memorable characters. He portrayed them in such a realistic way that they seemed like real people. The Imran Series features a diverse cast of distinctive and vividly portrayed characters.

X-2, the chief of the secret service, in fact is Ali Imran (sometimes played by Tahir aka Black Zero). The members of the X-2's team are: Juliana Fitzwater, Safdar Saeed, Tanveer Ashraf, Khawar, Chauhan, Nomani, Siddeeque, Zafar ul Mulk, Jameson, and Nimi. Sir Sultan, Secretary of the Ministry of foreign affairs,

Roshni, an Anglo-Burmese girl, is Imran's long time friend; she was Imran's working partner for sometime, but later left him.

Captain Fayyaz is the Superintendent of the Central Intelligence Bureau. Not very sharp or intelligent, he with the help of Imran is able to solve numerous cases, which resulted in his promotions.

Imran resides in a flat with his cook, Sulaiman, Sulaiman's wife, Gul-Rukh and the Central African bodyguard, Joseph Mugunda.

Imran's family includes his father Karam Rahman (also mentioned as Abdul Rahman in initial books), Director General of Central Intelligence Bureau, mother Amma Bi, and sister Suraiya. Suraiya marries Dr. Shahid in the books, Adha Teetar and Adha Batair.

In series written by Ibn-E-Safi, One of a biggest foe of Imran was Tsung Hi, a chinese criminal who on certain occasions favored Imran by not killing him or harming him and vice versa. He was described as a tall, very thin man with glowing eyes full of energy. Imran considered him one of his worthy adversary and vice versa. Tsung Hi was a master in martial art as well as a very intelligent individual. He knew a very lesser known art of deceiving bullets from a very close range which Imran was able to learn from him in their first encounter in London during his study in Oxford. He joyfully calls Imran Bhatija (son of one's brother) meaning nephew in return to which Imran used to call him chacha meaning uncle.

== Headquarters of the Secret Service ==
Daanish Manzil was the initial headquarters of the Secret Services. It, however, was exposed thus destroyed in one of the adventures (see Sugarbank trilogy) and the Secret Services was forced to shift its headquarters to a new building called "Psycho Mansion," which operates under the semblance of a psychiatric clinic. Till Safi's last book "Psycho Mansion" maintains its status of being the headquarters. The members of the Secret Service, from time to time, also use another building, the mansion of "Rana Palace," as a hideout and operations centre.

== Plagiarism ==
During 1960–1963, while Ibn-e-Safi was suffering from schizophrenia, many amateur writers started posing themselves as Ibn-e-Safi and produced third class copies of his work, distorting the character of not only Ali Imran, but also of Colonel Faridi and Captain Hameed. These acts of vandalism were reported by Ibn-e-Safi himself in the preface of Daidh Matwaalay (One and a Half Amused – #42), the book he returned with after his recovery. Some writers and publishers still continue to write on Safi's characters, much to the annoyance of many fans. Safi used to mention fans' complaints sometimes in the prefaces, and mocked the fake publishers and writers in his own witty style.

During Ibn-e-Safi's life, many writers started writing on his characters illegally, and many writers continued to write even after Ibn Safi's death, such as MA Rahat, S Qureshi, Mazhar Kaleem, Safdar Shaheen, MA Peerzada, Mushtaq Ahmed Qureshi, MS Qadri, Zaheer Ahmed (Author), Jahanzeb Aziz, Ibn-e-Rahat, Ali Nawazish, Irshad Alaser Jaferi, Syed Ali Hassan Gillani etc. Ayne Safi (N Safi), MA Sajid, Ibne Kaleem, Nasir Javed, Azhar Kaleem, Humayun Iqbal, writes books in the series, and has introduced many new characters in the series.

MA Rahat died on 24 April 2017. Ibn-e-Kaleem died on 12 March 2017. Mazhar Kaleem died on 26 May 2018. Some fans of Ibn-e-Safi dismiss many fake Imran Series writers books, arguing that they distorted the original 'feel' of the series, and that he deformed the key characteristics of many characters, including Ali Imran. Nevertheless.

== See also ==
- Ali Imran
- Imran series characters
- List of Imran Series by Ibn-e-Safi
