= Black Zero (disambiguation) =

Black Zero is a name used by certain characters and organizations in DC Comics.

Black Zero may also refer to:

- Black Zero, a fake copy of Zero (Mega Man) in Mega Man X2
- Black Zero, an armor power-up for Zero in most games of the Mega Man X series
- Tahir/Black Zero, a character from Imran series
