= Humayun Iqbal =

Pakistani novelist and poet

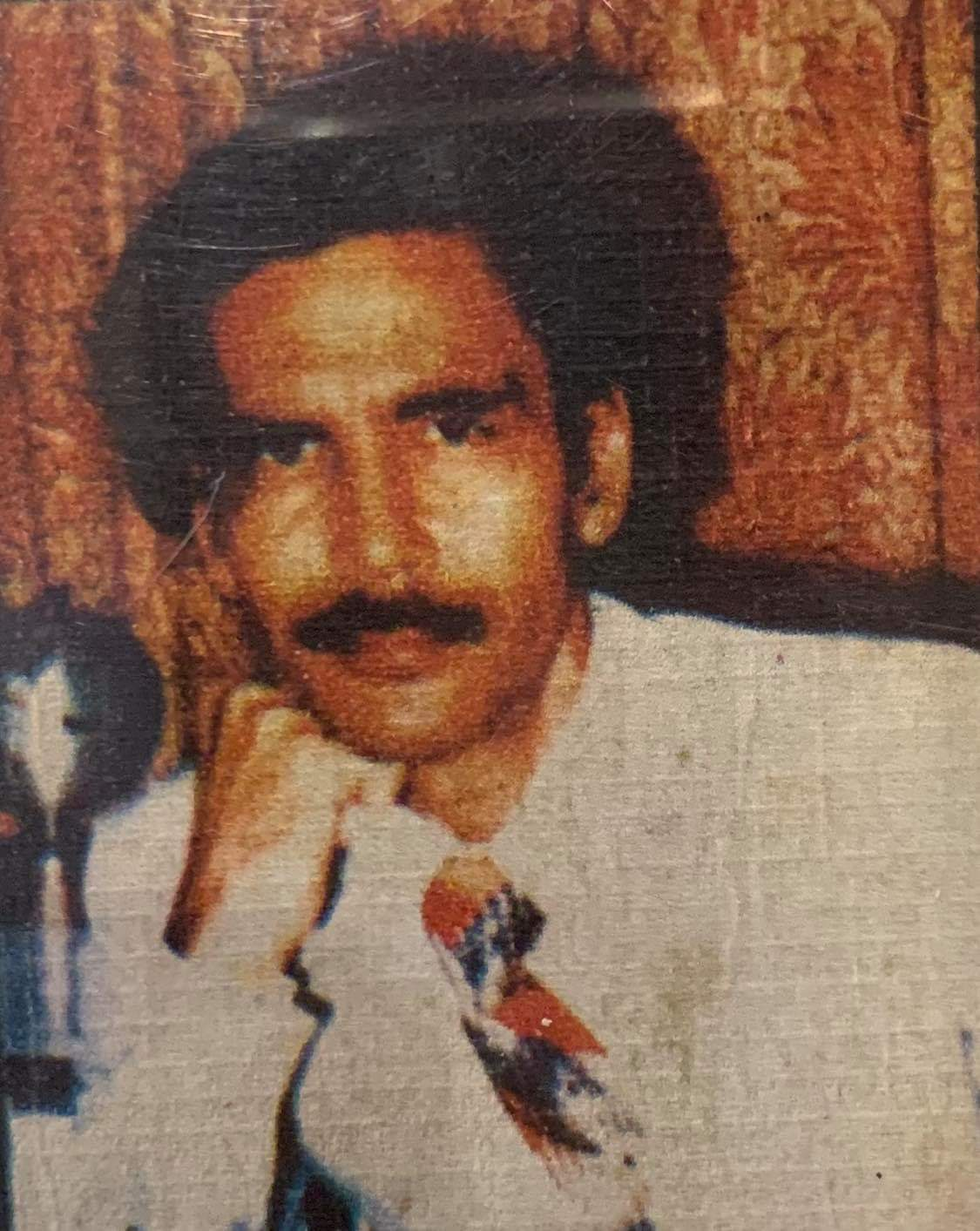
Creator of Parmod character

Humayun Iqbal (H Iqbal) (Urdu ہمایوں اقبال ایچ اقبال) was a Pakistani novelist and poet. He was born on 6 July 1941, in Rampur, died on 14 April 2025 in Karachi, Pakistan.

After Ibn-e-Safi, H Iqbal created his own spy series Parmod Series or "Major Parmod Series" in August 1965. His characters, Major Parmod and Colonel D, are famous spies in Urdu.

His other notable books:

- Mustaqbil Shanas
- Janbaz
- Challawa
