= Sajid Hameed =

- Jasoosi Dunya character
- Picture from "Tijori Ka Raaz" by Mohammad Hanif
- First appearance: March, 1952 (Dilaer Mujrim)
- Last appearance: July 17, 1980 (Sehra'ee Deewaanah-2)
- Created by: Ibne-Safi

In-universe information
- Alias: Captain Hameed
- Gender: Male
- Title: Sergeant (Crime Branch), assistant to Col. Faridi
- Occupation: Detective
- Religion: Islam
- Nationality: British India, India

Sajid Hameed (Urdu: ساجد حمید) (Sergeant Hameed, later Captain Hameed) is a fictional character of the Urdu spy novel series Jasoosi Dunya (The Spy World). He is a detective and crime-fighter, conceived by Ibn-e-Safi as the secondary focal character to assist the lead role of Colonel Ahmad Kamal Faridi.

== Character ==
=== Personality ===
Hameed's character complements that of Faridi's. Hameed is playful, naughty, carefree, romantic, and when occasion calls for it, hardworking, brave, fearless, intelligent, and smart. Most of the time he acts like a child in front of Faridi and pretends to be a careless and messy character, frequently arguing with Faridi merely to irritate him. In his heart, however, he harbours a deep love for his boss. The fact that he is able to confront Faridi, not an easy thing to do, is evidence of his strong character. Often it is Hameed's seemingly impulsive actions that lead Faridi to victory.

Hameed often jumps into action without thinking of the consequences, only to be surprised later on. Ibn-e-Safi calls this condition "khopri pe Chhipkali sawar hona", which literally means Hameed's mental apprehension by a lizard. The lizard is used metaphorically as an object that irritates someone in an extreme fashion. Several of Hameed's successes are a direct result of this phenomenon.

=== First Meeting with Faridi ===
The story of how Hameed met Faridi is related by Hameed to himself in "Thandi Aag" (The Cold Fire - #69). After returning from wartime, Hameed did not want to go back to his family. He saw Faridi at the airport and hugged him screaming "Bhai Jaan" (Dear Brother), while his father, who came to receive him, looked on in disbelief as Hameed completely refused to recognize him. Later on, after being convinced by Faridi, Hameed went back to his family and apologized for the joke he pulled on his father.

=== Background ===
"Thandi Aag", more importantly, explains how Hameed became as he is. Hameed's father was a traditionally-minded man who forced him to join the armed forces against his will. Hameed was consequently sent to war at a very young age. Seeing the horrendous aftermath of war led him to take comfort in the influence of alcohol. As the value of life diminished in his eyes and he started to ignore the importance of life, his carefree, somewhat irritated, and neglecting nature developed. After meeting Faridi, Hameed's philosophy on life changed dramatically to that which readers now know.

=== Personal life ===
In his early days, Hameed was involved with a girl named Shahnaaz. The affair lasted for a while to the point at which Hameed was almost ready to propose. However, it is clear to the reader that the lovers were not fully matured and were conflicted between the matters of heart and mind. Although it was necessary for the characters to go through such a mental evolutionary process, their nature meant that there could be no permanent rest. Hence, the character of Shahnaaz was removed.

=== Pets ===
Hameed is infamous for his pets that he trains himself. Some of these pets include a goat, a mouse, and a myna. The mouse first appears in "Khatarnaak Dushman" (The Dangerous Enemy #36). Hameed has trained her in such a way that she dances when he whistles. She has tiny bells wrapped around her legs (called "Ghunguroo" in Urdu/Hindi) that chime when she dances. Hameed loses the mouse in the underground world of Gerald Shashtri in "Jungle Ki Aag" (The Forest Fire #37), but finds her back in "Maut Ki Chataan" (The Rock of Death #41).

The goat, Barkhurdaar Bughra Khan (which literally means "Son Goat Khan" - a sarcastic title), first appears in "Andheray Ka Shehenshah" (The Emperor of the Dark - #39). Hameed often takes "Bughra Khan" to restaurants and clubs, arguing that since women could come with their pet dogs, he should also be allowed with his pet goat. Of course, many restaurant and club owners would have a hard time accepting this reasoning since "Bughra Khan" often ends up with an uncontrolled urge to chew on furniture and table covers. Hameed thinks "Bughra Khan" is no ordinary goat. Hameed dresses the goat up like a gentleman wearing a hat and a tie around the neck. Faridi is constantly annoyed with Hameed’s goat.

The myna (Hameed calls her "Bee Maina" - a traditional name for a myna in Urdu) is the last of his pets. This myna is extraordinary since she can not only speak Urdu words but is capable of carrying out longer conversations and mimic human emotions.

== See also ==
- Ibn-e-Safi
- Jasoosi Dunya
- Ahmad Kamal Faridi
- Faridi's Unofficial Aide
- Villains of Jasoosi Dunya
- List of Jasoosi Dunya by Ibn-e-Safi
