= Imran series characters =

Characters in Pakistani Urdu spy novel series

The Imran Series is an Urdu spy novel series created by famous Pakistani writer Ibn-e-Safi. Ali Imran is the pivotal character, a comical secret agent who controls the Secret Service as X-2 but appears to work as just another member of the Secret Service. Except for a handful of people, no one knows his status as the chief of the Service.

The first book, Khaufnaak Imaarat (The Terrifying Building), was published in October 1955. In early books Imran appears as a solo detective, but from the ninth book, Dhuaen ki Tehreer (The Scribbling in Smoke), he is portrayed as the chief of Secret Service as X-2.

Humour is the essence of Ibn-e-Safi books. Ibn-e-Safi wrote a total of 121 Imran Series books.

== Characters of Imran Series ==
Ali Imran (X-2), Safdar Saeed, Black Zero (Tahir), Juliana Fitzwater (Julia), Amma Bi, Surayya, Fazal Rahman, Sir Sultan, Roshee, Joseph Mugonda, Sulaiman, Captain Fayyaz, Zafar-ul-Mulk, Jameson (Jumman Bafati), Tanveer Ashraf, Captain Jaafari, Captain Khawar, Lieutenant Siddique, Lieutenant Chauhan, Sergeant Nomani, Doctor Dawar, Shakeel (friend of Ali Imran from Imran Series novel 15 Kaly Chiragh), Sualeha (friend of Surayya and daughter of Dr Dawood, Director General of Institute of Scientific Research from Imran Series Novel 48 Doosri Aankh)

Many writers have written on the famous characters of Ibn-e-Safi and have included their own characters in Imran Series and Jasoosi Dunya (Fareedi Hameed Series).

== Secret Service Members ==
Original author Ibn-e-Safi used the Secret Service as a central focus of the Imran Series. Later authors, continuing the series, added new members of the Secret Service. Real-world locations are not used in the series, instead fictional countries and place names are used.

=== Ali Imran ===
Ali Imran is a pivotal character and gives the series its name. He is handsome and bright, holding M.Sc. and Ph.D. degrees from Oxford University, and has extraordinary sex appeal. He camouflages himself as a buffoon and never reveals his true nature. He often dresses eccentrically: his typical outfit is a pink coat, a light green shirt, a yellow necktie, white pants, and a purple flat hat with a red rose in it. Ibn-e-Safi refers to this as Imran's “Technicolor Outfit.”

Imran is the son of Karam Rehman (Rahman Sahib), Director General of the Central Intelligence Bureau. He claims descent from Genghis Khan, and has Mongol ancestry. Imran mother's real name is never revealed, she is referred to as Amma Bi. Imran lives in an apartment with his two most trusted assistants: Sulaiman, the cook, and Joseph Mugunda, his bodyguard from Africa. He usually drives a two-seater sports car.

Imran purposefully maintains multiple facets to his personality. As Ali Imran, he acts as an opportunist who may turn either a police informer or a blackmailer as the situation demands. He is also the chief of the Secret Services, called X-2. Only three other characters know his secret: Sir Sultan, Secretary of the Ministry of Internal Affairs; Black Zero, who acts as X-2 in Imran's absence; and Roshee, a long time friend and trusted partner. Imran also occasionally assumes the personae of the Prince of Dhump, a warlord of a fictitious state known as Dhump, and of Rana Tahavvar Al Sandooqui, a wealthy landlord and businessman, and Saff e Shikan, a hero to the people of Shikral.

Early in the series Imran is portrayed as a hired agent of the Secret Service. Later he becomes a regular member of the agency. The other agents are not aware that he is their chief officer. As Imran, they laugh and sneer at him, but as X-2 they dread him.

Imran learned the art of dodging bullets, called "Sing Art," from an international Chinese criminal, Sing Hee. Imran calls him Uncle Sing (Chcha Sing - چچا سنگ) and, in return, Sing Hee refers him as nephew. An old time foe who becomes enamored of him is Theresia Bumblebee of Bohemia, T3B. Imran shows no interest in women, stating that women are not for him. He believes no woman would stay by his side as per his job.

=== Tahir or Black Zero ===
Tahir is portrayed as perhaps the most important member of the secret service. He knows that Imran is X-2 and plays the role of X-2 in Imran's absence.

In Darindon Ki Basti Imran realizes that his coworkers, mainly Juliana Fitzwater, are beginning to suspect that he is X-2. To permanently remove their suspicions, he decides to induct another member, codenamed "Black Zero" into the Secret Service. However, the original Black Zero is killed. Imran therefore appoints Tahir to the job and assigns him the Black Zero codename. The members of the secret service know him only as Mr. Tahir, the caretaker of Rana Palace.

Black Zero is Imran's favorite subordinate, but none of the members of Secret Service know about his true identity. He can replicate X-2's deep, hoarse voice to give orders to Secret Service agents when Imran is not available.

=== Juliana Fitzwater (Julia) ===
Juliana Fitzwater is the second in command, or deputy chief, of the Secret Service. She is a beautiful Swiss girl. Before Imran had joined the Secret Service in his Ali Imran persona, Julia was both fascinated by and afraid of her Chief, X-2. However, when Imran joins the Secret Service, Julia becomes attracted to him instead. Julia becomes suspicious that Imran is X-2, and confronts him; Imran is shocked but manages to cover his identity with the help of Black Zero.

=== Safdar Saeed ===
Safdar is Imran's most active and most trusted field partner. Safdar never questions Imran's authority: he is a man of action not words.

Safdar is the only field agent, apart from Imran, who is not attracted by Julia. He is also the only Secret Service agent who is fluent in Shikrali (a language spoken in the tribal area of Shikral). Safdar Saeed is the most prominent, respectful, and loyal agent after Tahir, and Imran relies heavily on him. Safdar respects Imran greatly.

=== Tanveer Ashraf ===
Tanveer loves Julia, but Julia loves Imran. Tanveer is the only member of the Secret Service who is jealous of Imran. His jealousy towards Imran often gets in the way of his duty.

Tanveer's primary weakness is that he lacks patience and is very emotional. He is the most trouble-making member of the Secret Service. He has, on many occasions, received either warnings or punishment from X-2 for his negligence of duty.

Despite his jealousy of Imran, on he has on many occasions proven his worth. Before he joined the Secret Service he was in military intelligence, and is fond of direct action.

In the book Farishtay ka Dushman, he faces a motorbike accident in the line of duty and is left permanently unable to carry on with field work. He is transferred to another department and is replaced in the Secret Service by Sergeant Nemo.

=== Zafar-ul-Mulk and Jameson (Jumman Bafati) ===
Zafar-ul-Mulk and Jumman Bafati were introduced in Taboot Mein Cheekh. Zafar-ul-Mulk is the nephew of Nawab Muzaffarul Mulk. He was sent to London for his education with his servant Jumman Bafati, earning a master's degree in chemistry from Oxford University. During this period Bafati is renamed Jameson. On his return, his uncle becomes annoyed with his modern ideas and asks him, and Jameson, to leave home. By chance they become involved in a case and Imran discovers their strengths. They are invited to join the Secret Service. Zafar-ul-Mulk has similar physical characteristics to Imran, and Imran sometimes disguises Zafar-ul-Mulk as himself.

=== Captain Khawar ===
An active member of the group four stars and also works for the secret service.

=== Lieutenant Siddique ===
An active member of the group four stars and also works for the secret service.

=== Lieutenant Chohan ===
An active member of the group four stars and also works for the secret service.

=== Sergeant Nomani ===
An active member of the group four stars and also works for the secret service.

=== Captain Jaafri and Sergeant Nashad ===
Captain Jaafari and Sargeant Nashad are incompetent Secret Service agents. They were expelled from the Service due to negligence on duty in "Darindon ki Basti", Alphonse (Alphonse).

== Other main characters ==
=== Karam Rahman (Rehman Sahib) ===
Karam Rahman (Fazal Rahman) is the father of Ali Imran who is Director-General of the Central Intelligence Bureau (CIB). He is a very strict person both at home and in the office.

=== Amma Bi ===
Imran's mother, Amma Bi, is an eastern style housewife. She is a casualty of the severe idea of her better half, Rahman Sahib. She doesn't need Imran to go out, yet is powerless to do anything as a result of her better half. At whatever point Imran visits her, she beats him with her shoes.

=== Suraiya ===
Imran's younger sister Surya is blessed with the strict nature of her father. She is also fed up with Imran's unserious behavior and lets no opportunity slide to show her anger towards her brother.

=== Sir Sultan ===
Sir Sultan is the administrator of the Secret Service, and one of the few characters who can identify Imran as X-2. Imran reports directly to him. He is both irritated at times by Imran's behavior and appreciative of his talents. He has even wished that Imran had been his son. He is an old friend of Imran's father.

Sir Sultan is the Secretary of the Ministry of External Affairs. In the novel Raat Ka Shehzaada, Imran helps Sir Sultan by solving a case; in return he is offered a permanent position in the Secret Service.

=== Roshee ===
Roshee is an Anglo-Burmese girl who was saved by Imran before he became X-2. Intelligent and confident, she has helped Imran in many cases. Imran trusts her, and she has known that he is X-2 since he took on this role.

Roshee's father was a businessman in Singapore. During WWII, he lost his business and Roshee became a call girl. After meeting Imran in Bhayanak Aadmi, she becomes ashamed of her profession and Imran offers her a job in the Central Intelligence Bureau. Later, she and Imran open a private investigation agency, "Roshee & Co. Forwarding & Clearing Agents". She stops working for Imran in Larkiyoan Ka Jazeera, although Imran continues to involve her in cases.

=== Joseph Mugonda ===
Joseph Mugonda, an African black man, is Imran's personal bodyguard. He is tall, well-built, and an ex-heavyweight boxing champion. He prefers to dress in a military uniform with holsters on each side, carrying two identical loaded revolvers.

In Challees Aik, Baavan, Imran defeats Joseph's boss during a case. Joseph's philosophy is that whoever can knock him out he will willingly serve for the rest of his life, and he begins to work for Imran. He is extremely loyal, sometimes referring to Imran as his father. He is a heavy drinker and highly superstitious but is nevertheless a very useful companion. His knowledge of jungles has proved useful on several occasions. He also serves as the Prince of Dhump's bodyguard when Imran assumes this role.

=== Sulaiman ===
Sulaiman is Imran's cook and housekeeper. Imran and Sulaiman often have comic interactions about the food Sulaiman is going to prepare. Sulaiman was originally employed by Imran's father. He dislikes Imran's bodyguard Joseph, who is always drunk. Later in the series, he marries a girl named Gulrukh.

=== Super Fayyaz ===
Super Fayyaz is a friend of Imran's. He is the Superintendent of the Central Intelligence Bureau, under Imran's father Fazal Rehman. Imran occasionally calls him Super Fayyaz. He and Imran have a complex relationship. He consults Imran when in difficulties, but is also jealous of Imran and has several times attempted, unsuccessfully, to arrest him. Fayyaz is not very intelligent, but solves many cases with Imran's help and rises to the position of Superintendent.

=== Shakeel ===
Shakeel is a friend of Ali Imran from Imran Series novel 15 Kaly Chiragh by Ibn-e-Safi.

=== Sualiha ===
Sualiha, daughter of Doctor Dawood Director-General from Institute of Scientific Research and Sualeha is also a friend of Surya (Imran's sister), from Imran Series Novel 48 Doosri Aank). Secret service Suliha added by M.Kaleem in Kakana Island 206

== Villains ==
=== Tsung He ===
Tsung He is a criminal genius and treacherous villain. As well as appearing in the Imran Series, he also appears in Ibn-e-Safi's series Jasoosi Dunya (The Spy World).

Tsung was born, out of wedlock, to a Chinese father and Mongolian mother, and is forced to leave China after a failed coup d'état. Since then he has moved from country to country. He is very thin and appears weak, but is actually very strong. He is also known as "Jonk" (leech) because of his ability to squeeze his enemies until they lose consciousness.

Imran first meets Tsung He in London, where Imran is conducting research in criminology, in the book Lashoan Ka Bazaar. A criminal named McLawrence has terrorized the city. Imran investigates, and comes across Tsung He. Tsung has devised a technique that allows him to dodge any bullets fired on him by judging the hand movements of the assailant, and moving swiftly. Tsung He uses this technique in front of Imran, and Imran asks him to do it again and again till 36 rounds has been fired. That is enough for Imran to learn the technique. Imran then surprises Tsung He by challenging him to shoot at him; Tsung He fails to hit him, and despite the fact that they are enemies he declares Imran his nephew in terms of cunningness.

Tsung He's next appearance is in Joank Ki Wapsee, in a story line that continues in Zehreeli Tasweer and Baebaakon Ki Talaash. Tsung He is working for an international criminal organization, Zeroland. Tsung He is the major villain in many other novels such as Seh Rangee Maut, Muta-Harrik Dhaariyaan, Joank Aur Naagan, Halaakat Khaez, Zebra Maen, and Jangal Ki Sheheriyat.

Tsung He always manages to escape Imran, with the exception of Larztee Lakeerain. In this story, Imran captures Tsung He but subsequently releases him.

=== Humbug the Great ===
Humbug the Great is an international criminal whose most prominent physical characteristic is a hump on his back. He is a foreign spy who plans to start a revolution in Imran's country. He plays several roles simultaneously. Sometimes he is found in a third-rate bar flirting with an old and ugly barmaid. He also appears as the husband of a beautiful woman, the Rani of Sajid Nagar.

Ibne Safi had written the first two novels of the Humbug story-line, Dilchasp Hadisaa and Bay-Awaaz Sayyarah, when he fell sick for three years. The third and final novel of this narrative arc, Daerh Matwaalay, was written after his recovery.

=== Theresia - Bumble-Bee of Bohemia ===
Ibn-e-Safi has written many novels involving Theresia, the Bumble-bee of Bohemia, or T3B. She is a very smart woman who represents the criminal organization Zeroland. She can disguise herself by changing her expression. She is very impressed with Imran's personality and is attracted to him.

T3B first appears in Kaalay Charaagh. She also appears in Khoon Kay Piyaasay, Alphansay, Darandoan Ki Basti, Piyaasa Samandar, Seh Rangee Maut, Sugar Bank, Mutaharrik Dhaariyaan, Joank Aur Naagan, Halaakat Khaez, Zebra Man, Jangal Ki Sheheriyat, and Zulmat ka Devta.

=== Bogha ===
Professor Bogha (Urdu: بوغا) is a highly learned international villain. He was once head of the Zeroland organization. His main physical characteristic is that he is very short. His main line of work is smuggling contraband. He appears in Imran Ka Aghwa, and is killed by Theresia in Zulmaat ka Devtaa (Urdu: ظلمات کا دیوتا).

=== Others ===
Ad Lava, 'Allamah Dehshatnaak, Alphonse and Deadly Frog (a.k.a. King Chang) are other significant characters in the Imran series. All of these except 'Allamah Dehshatnaak were killed by Imran. Adélie de Savana, or Louisa, was a French intelligence agent and James Harley, a foreign agent of X-2, were initially allies of Imran but turned against him and were killed by him.

== Secret Service Members added by different writers who wrote on Ibn-e-Safi created characters ==
Ibn-e-Safi (creator of Imran Sereis) added 8th secret service member named "Sargent Nemo" instead of Tanveer Ashraf due to Tanveer injury, but this place is not a proper place in Secret Service members. Some other writers added their own characters in secret service. According to available record the list is as under:

=== Secret Service members added by Azhar Kaleem ===
Hatim

=== Secret Service members added by MA Sajid ===
Mr. Brown (Telepaith)

=== Secret Service members added by MA Pirzada ===
Major Mumtaz

=== Secret Service members added by Ibn-e-Kaleem ===
Imrana

=== Secret Service members added by N Safi + Najma Safi ===
Imrana

=== Secret Service members added by MS Qadri ===
Black Painther Team (Two Members)

=== Secret Service members added by Aslam Rahi MA ===
Red Tiger Team (Two Members)

=== Secret Service members added by Mazahar Kaleem ===
Author Mazhar Kaleem used the name of Secret Service as the Pakishia Secret Service in his contributions to the Imran Series.

=== Sualeha ===
There is another character named Sualeha created by Mazhar Kaleem. She is a talented field worker. She works in Secret Service, She is attracted to Safder Saeed. She respects Imran and is aware of Julia's attraction to Imran. She thinks of Imran as an elder Kakana Island 206

=== Captain Shakeel ===
Captain Shakeel first appeared in the novel Makazonga, It is said that this was Mazhar Kaleem first novel. Captain Shakeel has a face without expression and is known as a power agent. He is as smart as Ali Imran and he also thinks in the same way. Captain Shakeel's character has glimpses of Safdar's character. He joined the Pakishia Secret Service after transferring from Military Intelligence.

=== Secret Service members added by Safdar Shaheen ===
Captain Babar

=== Secret Service members added by Ibn-e-Shahab ===
Imrana

=== Tiger ===
The character of Tiger was created by Mazhar Kaleem and continued in Zaheer Ahmed's novels. Tiger is a student of Imran's in Judo, martial arts and disguise. He is called "the second Imran" because his field work is outstanding. His real name is Abdul Ali and he is a Muslim.

=== Juana ===
Juana was introduced into the series by Mazhar Kaleem. He is an American Negro and a member of the criminal organization "Master Killers", which assassinates prominent personalities. Master Killers was hired to kill Imran in Imran Ki Maut. Juana came to Pakasia as part of a team of four assassins. Master Killers failed to kill Imran, and after an intense battle Juana accepted Imran as his master. Juana is an excellent martial arts fighter, 7.5 feet (2.3 metres) tall. He has a cruel nature and a strong body like a wrestler. Like Joseph, Juana sometimes acts as a personal body guard of the Prince of Dhump.

In Mazhar Kaleem's contributions four characters (Captain Khawar, Lieutenant Siddique, Lieutenant Chauhan and Sergeant Nomani) are called the "Four Stars" to the series. Siddique is the chief of the Four Stars. Chauhan is incomparable at field work. Nomani is the most intelligent agent in the Secret Service.

== See also ==
- Ibn-e-Safi
- Imran Series
- Ali Imran
- List of Imran Series
- H Iqbal
- MA Rahat
- S Qureshi
- MS Qadri
- Mazhar Kaleem
