= Jasoosi Dunya =

Jasoosi Dunya (Urdu: جاسوسى دنيا) is a popular series of Urdu detective stories created by Ibne-Safi. Its first novel, Dilaer Mujrim (دلير مجرم) was published in March 1952. In the following 27 years, Ibn-e-Safi wrote 127 books in the series with his last Jasoosi Dunya novel, Sehra'ee Deewana (صحرائی دیوانہ), appearing in July 1979, a year before his death.

== Overview ==
The series mainly spotlights Inspector (later an honorary Colonel) Faridi and Sergeant (later honorary Captain) Hameed, although four books in the series were focused purely on the characters of Anwar (a crime reporter and a private detective) and Rasheeda (his aide and love interest), with an intent of having a spin-off series of its own, which did not succeed somehow. The characters, however, occasionally appeared in many future stories as supporting cast.

A model of rectitude and obsessed with his detective-work, Ahmed Kamal Faridi is a no-nonsense aristocrat who loathes crime and is much resolute in expunging the criminals. He sometimes goes beyond normal human limits as Ibn-e-Safi cast him as an extreme masculine model of physical fitness and moral excellence.

Sajid Hameed is Faridi's most favoured and trusted aide. Some integrated story lines define how Faridi found him as a delusional drunkard affected by the brutalities of the World War, rehabilitated him and sheltered him in his own house. The series refers to their brotherly affection and mutual trust at various occasions. Both characters have been designed as two sides of a coin and are inseparable. While Faridi is cast as a graceful, lord-like aristocrat with deep respect for values, Hameed brings a nonchalant, mischievous and lighthearted comic relief.

The series has another regular called Qasim, a close friend of Hameed's, who with his utmost idiot behavior, provides a backdrop to Hameed's comedic actions, while aiding main story plots.

The central idea and theme of Safi's first book was taken from Victor Gunn's novel Ironside's Lone Hand. However, the key characters, Faridi and Hameed, were Ibn-e-Safi's own creation. As mentioned by the author in the preface to one of his books, the plots of Purasrar Ajnabee (پُراسرار اجنبی), Raqqasaa Ka Qat'l (رقاصہ کا قتل), Heeray Ki Kaan (ہیرے کی کان), and Khoonee Patthar (خونی پتھر) were adopted from various English-language novels. The characters of Professor Durrani from Khaufnaak Hangaama (خوفناک ہنگامہ), and the Chimpanzee and the White Queen from Paharon Ki Malikaa (پہاڑوں کی ملکہ) were also borrowed from English literature. The rest of Ibne-Safi's novels are purely his own creations. Jasoosi Dunya used to be published simultaneously from Pakistan and India. Hameed has a great love and respect for Freedi, and according to Freedi, the end of Hameed would be the end of him. They both love each unconditionally like brothers. Hameed also gets serious at times and surprises Freedi by his actions.

== Colonel Faridi ==
Ahmed Kamal Faridi has aristocratic lineage and is the son of a Nawab (a lord from sub-continent "during British Empire on Pakistan and India"). A man of principles, Faridi believes in a rigorously disciplined life, controlled emotions, and objectivity. His abstinence from inebriation, carnal lusts, and uncontrolled desires illustrates his sound character. The opposite sex leaves a little rather no effect on him; emotionally he appears unmoved. Because of his impassive and subdued emotional nature, Sajid Hameed dubs him as "Father Hardstone". It does not mean that he is dispassionate, deep inside he is of a sensitive nature.

Faridi is a highly educated man. Despite his vast riches, his obsession towards solving riddles and creating a crime-free society compels him to work at the investigation bureau as a mere inspector. Due to his remarkable services to the nation, he is conferred upon the title of honorary colonel later in life. Due to a blanket presidential authorization, he can supersede the highest authorities in matters of national interest. He also leads a secret crime fighting network (called the Black Force), whose existence is referred to as a secret between him and the country's president. The Force has global associates who help the duo on their international assignments.

In addition to his varied skills, Faridi has several distinct interests. These include reading, and keeping dogs and snakes. He has a strong interest in science, particularly chemistry, and maintains a well-equipped laboratory at his home. Faridi is reported to speak several local and foreign languages. He is also described as a skilled makeup artist who has developed his own techniques within the field. He is closely protective of Hameed and monitors his safety consistently. He reacts strongly if Hameed is placed in danger. Faridi is approximately 30 years old and is described as having a neat appearance. Despite reported attention from women, he is characterized as having no romantic interest in them.

== Captain Hameed ==
As Faridi's confidante, Captain Sajid Hameed provides comic relief supporting his superior. Upon return from the duties, he accidentally meets Faridi and joins hands with him. Having a rebellious nature and much unlike Faridi, Hameed is non-serious, blithesome, jovial, and temperamental, but, on the other hand, his qualities of courage and fearlessness, intelligence and astuteness, at times, surprise Faridi. He is known to flirt with women, but abstains from sexual or serious relationships.

One of Captain Hameed's unique interests is to train unusual pets like a mouse, a goat (Bughra Khan – بغرا خان), a Myna (مینا) and others. He is expert at playing musical instruments: violin and mouthorgan. Like his mentor, Faridi, he himself is a master of disguise.

== Supporting roles ==
Various characters repeatedly appear to aid Faridi and/or Hameed on different occasions in Jasoosi Dunya's escapades. They are the friends of Messrs Col. Faridi and Capt. Hameed and not some official adjutants.

=== Anwar and Rasheeda ===
Except for the initial four novels the two were never portrayed as pivotal characters; they turned up as unofficial aides of Colonel Faridi in the later books. The readers have a love and hate relationship with the crime reporter Anwar who works for the "Daily Star." He blackmails the evildoers, even become accomplice to a crime, but at the same time, hates the criminals. He has no respect for the society or moral values it stipulates. He thumbs his nose at authority and carries disdainful attitude toward women including his best friend Rasheeda. Due to the unjustly harsh past, the intelligent former lawyer turned into an angry, ruthless, but courageous individual having a rebellious philosophy of life known to him as "Revenge". Revenge, to him, is the driving force behind life, his life. The only authority that gets his esteem is Faridi; and he, on and off, joins hand with the later against the evil.

Being his next-door neighbour, Rasheeda is Anwar's colleague as well as the closest friend. Rasheeda is a fearless young woman who is always ready to fight out the criminals and their mucky activities. Her character is portrayed in a mysterious manner until her real identity is disclosed in Bhayanak Jazeera (بھیانک جزیرہ). She is the crown princess of a secret Island in Pacific Ocean; she was raised outside her state as her life was at risk from opponents. She, however, abdicates the throne in favour of Anwar and returns from her motherland.

=== Qasim ===
Qasim is a recurring character in the series and a close companion of Hameed. The two appear frequently together and provide much of the series' comic relief. Together with Hameed, Qasim invents nicknames for women based on their body types.

The only son of an industrialist baron, Qasim is portrayed to be a large man with an appearance similar to that of a genie and a child-like demeanor. His speech is characterized by a slurred, rambling manner.

=== Neelam ===
Neelam is a young, adventurous girl, who is brought up by the grand-leader, after her smuggled by some of the gangsters. With a strong urge of avenging her parents, she has a relentless desire to do away with the band of gangsters. Both her wishes are accomplished when she extends her help to Faridi and Hameed to wipe out the gang. Faridi adopts the youngster. She usually calls Faridi 'Uncle' and Hameed 'Baba' (father or old man), which profoundly irritates the honorary Captain. After assisting Faridi in a few cases, she is sent abroad for higher studies. Graduating in criminology, she returns in Neelam Ki Waapsi (نیلم کی واپسی).

=== Inspector Rekha ===
Young and ambitious officer struggling to achieve excellence in her career, Inspector Rekha Larson appears off and on when Colonel Faridi needs a female assistance. She tries to glue to Faridi but he, being allergic to women, keeps her at a distance. On the other hand, Hameed keeps flirting with Rekha and she keeps managing him away.

== Notorious figures ==
Ibne-Safi's fundamental strength rested with his ability of portraying several characters and their development. His forte did promote heroism; nevertheless, his pen didn't faint there. He continued painting antiheroes and villains in the same vein to compose some infamous figures.

=== Sing Hi ===
Sing Hi is an outlaw in these books. A Chinese expelled from his country on account of treason and insurgency, is wanted by most of the governments because of his international criminal activities.

Sing commits crimes for the sake of entertainment. Though slender appearance with a visibly weak physique, he has remarkable strength like of an animal. Those who know him, remember him as Jonk (leech) for his ability to clench his enemy to suffocation and unconsciousness. A control over his emotions makes him dangerous. His cool perhaps helps him to acquire another skill, the only of its kind, of dodging bullets fired at him from any reasonable distance. It is called "Sing Art."

Women are his only weakness and in this respect he does not let religion, caste, creed, nationality, age, and/or appearance hamper him.

He is the only villain to appear in both Jasoosi Dunya and Imran Series. Sing Hi holds a deep respect for both Faridi and Imran as he preferred to trap and use them rather than kill them. Sing, in fact, declared Imran to be his rightful nephew and in reciprocation Imran called him "Uncle Sing" (Urdu: چچا سنگ).

=== Finch ===
Like Theresia and Sing Hi, Finch is another amusing and unique character. Thought dwarf at only four feet and half, he possesses many talents. An innocent and simple soul, Finch used to work in a circus. He can extend his height by using bamboos and walk like a normal person. As Dr. Dread's mob kills his adopted orphan girl, Finch turned criminal, creating his own gang to take revenge on Dr. Dread. He follows Dread to Faridi's homeland. While Faridi manages to break Dr. Dread's mob, Finch escapes.

=== Dr. Narang (Mr-Q) ===
Dr. Narang appeared in Novel 29.Lashoon ka AabShaar (لاشوں کا آبشار - The Waterfall of Corpses). He killed 5 undercover agents of secret service who use name Mr-Q, stole their equipment and worked on their place for a long time. He also killed a retired Army engineer and stole his invention of ""Flying Remote Controlled Rifle"". He was hanged to death after he told his life story in front of court.

=== Other Criminals ===
Jabar is the first major villain who encounters Inspector Faridi. He is of Indo-Germanic background, influenced by Nazi philosophy. He is also a chemist and a scientist, and during one of his experiments his nose evaporates.

Nanota and Reema are agents from Zeroland, known as Second Serpent (دوسری ناگن) and Third Serpent (تیسری ناگن) respectively and both are deputy to First Serpent, T3B, Theresia. Both been imprisoned by Faridi and Hameed.

Gerald Shastri is an English figure with many talents. He is a scientist, an expert in Astrology and Hindu Philosophy. He comes to India (subcontinent) with plans to rule the world and is doomed by Faridi.

Dr. Salman perhaps is the toughest opponent of Colonel Faridi. He is psychologist by profession and is the head of the most powerful underworld organisation Taaqat (Power), a group that tries to bring revolution in the country.

Qalandar Bayabani is a spy storywriter, who actually is into dirty drug business being the largest drug dealer of the country.

== Black Force Organization ==
Through the special authorisation of the executive of the country, Faridi maintains a secret crime-fighting organisation: Black Force. As being the head, Faridi is usually referred to as Colonel Hardstone by the members of the Force. These agents, recognised by code names such as B-11, B-2 and so on, mostly hide their identity so much so that even Hameed gets irritated by it since, according to him, and rightly so, he is the closest companion of "Father Hardstone". The Black Force, actually, is an international organisation. As to the infrastructure of the organisation, its hierarchy or strength, or how its budget is met, the writer absolutely throws no light on these questions.

== See also ==
- Sajid Hameed
- Faridi's Unofficial Aide
- Villains of Jasoosi Dunya
- List of Jasoosi Dunya by Ibn-e-Safi
- Imran Series
