= Ahmad Kamal Faridi =

Fictional character

- Jasoosi Dunya character
- Picture from "Khaufnaak Hangaama"
- First appearance: March 1952 (Dilaer Mujrim)
- Last appearance: 17 July 1980 (Sehra'ee Deewaanah-2)
- Created by: Ibne-Safi

In-universe information
- Alias: Colonel Hardstone, Colonel Faridi
- Nickname: Father Hardstone
- Gender: Male
- Title: Inspector (Crime Branch)
- Occupation: Detective
- Family: Nawab Azizuddin Khan (Father)
- Religion: Islam
- Nationality: British India, Indian, later on migrated to Pakistan, Pakistani
- Education: Masters in Criminology
- School / University: University of Oxford

Ahmad Kamal Faridi (Urdu: احمد کمال فریدی) (Inspector Faridi, later Colonel Faridi, also known as Colonel Hardstone, Colonel Fareedi) is a fictional spy and crime-fighter, created by Ibn-e-Safi as the lead character of the Urdu spy novel series Jasoosi Dunya (The Spy World).

== Character ==
=== Chip off the Old Block ===
Faridi is the only son of Nawab Azeezuddin Khan. His father is an aristocrat, famous for his adventurous nature. Faridi is often regarded as a copy of his father in looks and instincts. Safi had mentioned several of Nawab Sahab's friends who come in contact with Faridi. Little detail is given on the rest of Faridi's family.

=== Rectitude of character ===
The main attraction in his face is his eyes. He appears to be a sleepy, lazy, careless businessman. However, those eyes are very deceiving. Behind them is the most alert mind of the century. Few people are able to talk to him while looking into his eyes.

Faridi's character has a multitude of inspiring qualities. He's a man of principles. He believes in leading life by strict rules, controlled emotions, and objectivity. His abstinence from drugs, non-conjugal sex, and uncontrolled desires shows his strong character. He emotionally remains unmoved in respect to the fairer sex. Other strong traits include respect of law, nationalism, observation, common sense, and optimism. He is strong and powerful like a lion, but is as swift as lightning.

Because of his composed, impassive and subdued emotional nature, Hameed, his closest partner and assistant, dubs him as "Father Hardstone".

=== Matters of heart ===
Colonel Hardstone was once seriously involved with Nawab Rasheeduz Zaman's daughter Ghazala. The romance did not last long. Faridi never liked talking about his affair with Ghizala and always kept his emotions contained. Soon, he realised that his life could not afford to have a strong emotion such as love, which could eventually become his greatest weakness in solving mysteries and catching culprits. The fact that he does not choose to fall in love with a member of the opposite sex does not mean that he cannot love or is not affected by it. Rajkumari Tara in Zahreela Admi (زہریلا آدمی) was one of the unfortunate girls who lost her life for Faridi. The account of her devastating destruction left Faridi trembling and astounded.

=== Peculiar hobbies ===
Faridi is also unique in selecting hobbies. His major interests include reading and domesticating dogs and snakes. Science, specifically chemistry projects, is another diversion that he indulges in during his spare time. He seems to know several languages and is found reading books in different languages, including German. Many breeds of dogs can be found in his enormous doghouse. He seems to possess some famous species of dogs, such as the African Yellow Dingo, German Shepherd, Greyhound, Bloodhound, etc. He takes the same approach with pet snakes. Black mamba and Indian cobra are some of the more dangerous kinds that he can handle with ease due to his training with the reptiles. One of the most distinguished arts that he has mastered is to incapacitate snakes by grabbing them by the tail and jolting them.

=== Residence ===
Faridi lives in a lavish mansion of gigantic proportion. His residence encompasses a backyard of several acres. Many rooms including bedrooms, living room, dining room, library, laboratory, museum, and servant quarters have been mentioned in his novels specifically. A front porch for parking and a huge garage for his cars is also part of the same residence. His mansion also has secret underground cellars.

=== Automobiles ===
Faridi drives models of several state-of-art auto brands of their time, namely Cadillac, Lincoln, and Austin Mini (a British Leyland car). In addition to his regular means of conveyance, Faridi's garage carries several vehicles for different occasions. For example, in Jungle Ki Aag (جنگل کی آگ), Faridi preps up a Jeep with machine guns and other arms. On several occasions, he repaints one of his many Fiats for concealment before going on a specific mission. Faridi also owns a boat that was used once or twice to chase down criminals.

=== From Inspector to "Colonel" ===
The title "Colonel" is honorary, much-awaited title that he reluctantly accepted after he caught a very contemptible character, Gerald Shastri, in Maut Ki Chataan (موت کی چٹان). Hameed also received his honorary "Captain" title at the same time. Faridi also possesses a "special permission" from the President to interfere in any matter that required his attention. Many of his colleagues and even senior officers envy him because of the endowments that he receives either by inheritance or by travail.

=== Wealth ===
Colonel Faridi's wealth is "inconceivable". The reader slowly realises Faridi's great wealth, an aspect of his character that makes him so mystical. From owning expensive vehicles, Ibne-Safi eventually takes Faridi to a level that is just unprecedented – an owner of an independent state as referred in Zahreela Admi (زہریلا آدمی) and Bechara/bechari (بیچارہ/بیچاری).

=== Black Force organisation ===
Faridi is also the head of a secret crime-fighting organisation called the "Black Force" It also has a name, "Black Cat" or "Blakies". As opposed to other superheroes, most members of his team know who their boss is. They usually refer to Faridi as Colonel Hardstone. On the other hand, members of Black Force usually hide their identity so much so that even Hameed gets irritated by it since he thinks he is the closest companion of "Father Hardstone". Black Force is also an international organisation and its members are found all over the world. These members are usually recognised by code names such as B11, B2, etc.

== See also ==
- Sajid Hameed
- Faridi's Unofficial Aide
- Villains of Jasoosi Dunya
- List of Jasoosi Dunya by Ibn-e-Safi
