= List of Jasoosi Dunya by Ibn-e-Safi =

Following is the complete list of 125 novels written by the original author Ibn-e-Safi in Jasoosi Dunya (جاسوسی دنیا) series. (Original number, original title (Roman), original title (Urdu), translated tile in parentheses, year first published.)

1. Dilaer Mujjrim (دلير مجرم) (The Courageous Criminal) Bilal Naseem - 1952
2. Khaufnaak Jungle (خوفناک جنگل) (The Terrifying Jungle) - 1952
3. Aurat Farosh ka Qatil (عورت فروش کا قاتل) (The Killer of Women-Merchant) - 1952
4. Tijoree ka Raaz (تجوری کا راز) (The Secret of the Safe) - 1952
5. Fareedi aur Leonard (فریدی اور لیونارڈ) (Fareedi and Leonard) - 1952
6. Pur-Asraar Kunwaan (پُراسرار کنواں) (The Mysterious Well) - 1952
7. Khatarnaak Boorha (خطرناک بوڑھا) (The Dangerous Old Man) - 1952
8. Massnoo'ee Naak (مصنوعی ناک) (The Artificial Nose) - 1952
9. Pur-Asraar Aajnabee (پُراسرار انجبی) (The Mysterious Stranger) - 1952
10. Ahmaqon ka Chakkar (احمقوں کا چکر) (The Circle of the Fools) - 1952
11. Pahaaron ki Malika (پہاڑوں کی ملکہ) (The Queen of the Mountains) - 1952
12. Maut ki Aandhee (موت کی آندھی) (The Storm of Death) - 1953
13. Heeray ki Kaan (ہیرے کی کان) (The Diamond Mine) - 1953
14. Tijoree ka Geet (تجوری کا گیت) (The Song of the Safe) - 1953
15. Aatishee Parindaa (آتشی پرندہ) (The Fiery Bird) - 1953
16. Khoonee Patthar (خونی پتھر) (The Bloody Stone) - 1953
17. Bhayaanak Jazeerah (بھیانک جزیرہ) (The Terrifying Island) - 1953
18. Ajeeb Aawaazein (عجیب آوازیں) (The Strange Sounds) - 1953
19. Raqqaasah ka Qatl (رقاصہ کا قتل) (The Murder of a Lady Dancer) - 1953
20. Neeli Raushnee (نیلی روشنی) (The Blue Light) - 1953
21. Shaahee Naqqaarah (شاہی نقارہ) (The Royal Drum) - 1953
22. Khoon ka Daryaa (خون کا دریا) (The River of Blood) - 1953
23. Qaatil Sangrezay (قاتل سنگرزے) (The Killer Pebbles) - 1953
24. Patthar ki Cheekh (پتھر کی چیخ) (The Screams of the Stone) - 1954
25. Khaufnaak Hungaamah (خافناک ہنگامہ) (The Terrifying Ruckus) - 1954
26. Doohraa Qatl (دوہرا قتل) (The Double Murder) - 1954
27. Chaar Shikaaree (چار شکاری) (The 4 Hunters) - 1954
28. Begunaah Mujjrim (بے گناہ مجرم) (The Innocent Criminal) - 1954
29. Laashon ka Aabshaar (لاشوں کا آبشار) (The Waterfall of Corpses) - 1954
30. Moonch Moondnay Wali (مونچھ مونڈنے والی) (The Moustache-Shaving Lady) - 1954
31. Geeton K Dhamaakay (گیتوں کے دھماکے) (The Explosions of Songs) - 1954
32. Siyaah Posh Lutaeraa (سیاہ پوش لٹیرا) (The Black Clad Robber) - 1954
33. Barf K Bhoot (برف کے بھوت) (The Snow-Ghosts) - 1954
34. Pur-haul Sannaataa (پُرہول سناٹا) (The Fearful Silence) - 1954
35. Cheekhtay Dareechay (چیختے دریچے) (The Crying Doors) - 1954
36. Khatarnaak Dushman (خطرناک دشمن) (The Dangerous Enemy) - 1955
37. Jungle ki Aag (جنگل کی آگ) (The Fire of Forest) - 1955
38. Kuchlee Hui Laash (کچلی ہوئی لاش) (The Crushed Corpse) - 1955
39. Andheray ka Shahinshaah (اندھیرے کا شہنشاہ) (The Emperor of the Darkness) - 1955
40. Pur-Asraar Wasiyyat (پُراسرار وصیت) (The Mysterious Will) - 1955
41. Maut ki Chattaan (موت کی چٹان) (The Rock of Death) - 1955
42. Neeli Lakeer (نیلی لکیر) (The Blue Line) - 1955
43. Taareek Saa'ay (تاریک سائے) (The Dark Shadows) - 1955
44. Saazish ka Jaal (سازش کا جال) (The Conspiracy Trap) - 1955
45. Khoonee Bagoolay (خونی بگولے) (The Bloody Whirlwinds) - 1955
46. Laashon ka Saudaagar (لاشوں کا سوداگر) (The Merchant of Corpses) - 1955
47. Haulnaak Veeraanay (ہولناک ویرانے) (The Frightening Wilderness) - 1955
48. Leonard ki Waapsi (لیونارڈ کی واپسی) (The Return of Leonard) - 1956
49. Bhayaanak Aaddmee (بھیانک آدمی) (The Frightening Man) - 1956 [§1]
50. Paagal Khaanay ka Qaidee (پاگل خانے کا قیدی) (The Prisoner of the Asylum) - 1956
51. Sho'lon ka Naach (شعلوں کا ناچ) (The Dance of the Flames) - 1956
52. Gyaarwaan Zeenah (گیارہواں زینہ) (The 11th Fornication) - 1956
53. Surkh Daa'irah (سرخ دائرہ) (The Red Circle) - 1956
54. Khoonkhwaar Larkiyaan (خونخوار لڑکیاں) (The Infuriated Girls) - 1956
55. Saa'ay ki Laash (سائے کی لاش) (The Corpse of the Shadow) - 1956
56. Pehlaa Sho'lah (پہلا شعلہ) (The First Flame) - 1956
57. Doosraa Sho'lah (دوسرا شعلہ) (The Second Flame) - 1956
58. Teesraa Sho'lah (تیسرا شعلہ) (The Third Flame) - 1956
59. Jahannam ka Sho'lah (جہنم کا شعلہ) (The Hellfire) - 1956
60. Zehreelay Teer (زہریلے تیر) (The Poisonous Arrows) - 1957
61. Paani ka Dhuwaan (پانی کا دھواں) (The Smoke of Water) - 1957
62. Laash ka Qehqahah (لاش کا قہقہ) (The Laughter of the Corpse) - 1957
63. Daaktar Dread (ڈاکٹر ڈریڈ) (Doctor Dread) - 1957
64. Shaitaan ki Mehboobah (شیطان کی محبوبہ) (The Devil’s Lady-Lover) - 1957
65. Anokhay Raqqaas (انوکھے رقاص) (The Special Dancers) - 1957
66. Pur-asraar Moojid (پُراسرار موجد) (The Mysterious Inventor) - 1957
67. Toofaan ka Aghwaa (طوفان کا اغوا) (The Abduction of Storm) - 1957
68. Rifle ka Naghmah (رائفل کا نغمہ) (The Song of the Rifle) - 1957
69. Thandee Aag (ٹھنڈی آگ) (The Cold Fire) - 1957
70. Japan ka Fitnah (جاپان کا فتنہ) (The Trials and Tribulations from Japan) - 1957
71. Dushmanon ka Shahr (دشمنوں کا شہر) (The City of Enemies) - 1957
72. Laash ka Bulaawaa (لاش کا بلاوا) (The Call of a Corpse) - 1958
73. Guard ka Aghwaa (گارڈ کا اغوا) (The Abduction of Guard) - 1958
74. Shaadi ka Hungaamah (شادی کا ہنگامہ) (The Chaos in the Wedding) - 1958
75. Wabaa'ee Haijaan (وبائی ہیجان) (The Epidemic Agitation) - 1958
76. Zameen k Baadal (زمین کے بادل) (The Clouds of the Earth) - 1958 [Also featuring 'Ali Imran]
77. Oonchaa Shikaar (اونچا شکار) (The Prized Victim) - 1958
78. Aawaarah Shehzaadah (آوارہ شہزادہ) (Prince Loafer) - 1958
79. Chaandnee ka Dhuwaan (چاندنی کا دھواں) (The Moonlight Smoke) - 1958
80. Saekron Hamshakal (سینکڑوں ہمشکل) (The Copious Twins) - 1958
81. Laraakuon ki Bastee (لڑاکوں کی بستی) (The Town of the Warriors) - 1959
82. Ultee Tasweer (الٹی تصویر) (The Upturned Painting) - 1959
83. Chamkeelaa Ghubaar (چمکیلا غبار) (The Glittering Dust) - 1959
84. Anokhee Rahzanee (انوکھی رہزنی) (The Unusual Robbery) - 1959
85. Dhuwaan Uth Rahaa Thaa (دھواں اُٹھ رہا تھا) (The Smoke was Rising) - 1959
86. Farhaadd 59 (فرہاد 59) - 1959
87. Zehreelaa Aadmee (زہریلا آدمی) (The Poisonous Man) - 1963
88. Prince Vehshee (پرنس وحشی) (The Untamed Prince) - 1960
89. Baychaarah/Baychaaree (بیچارہ/بیچاری) (The Effeminate Man/Woman) - 1963
90. Ishaaron K Shikaar (اشاروں کے شکار) (The Victims of Signs) - 1964
91. Sitaaron ki Maut (ستاروں کی موت) (The Death of the Stars) - 1964
92. Sitaaron ki Cheekhein (ستاروں کے چیخیں) (The Screams of the Stars) - 1964
93. Saatwaan Jazeerah (ساتواں جزیرہ) (The 7th Island) - 1965
94. Shaitaanee Jheel (شیطانی جھیل) (The Satanic Lake) - 1965
95. Sunehree Chingaariyaan (سنہری چنگاریاں) (The Golden Sparks) - 1965
96. Sehmee hui Larkee (سہمی ہوئی لڑکی) (The Frightened Girl) - 1966
97. Qaatil ka Haath (قاتل کا ہاتھ) (The Hand of the Killer) - 1966
98. Rulaanay Waalee (رُلانے والی) (The Lady who made them Weep) - 1966
99. Tasweer ka Dushman (تصویر کا دشمن) (The Enemy of the Picture) - 1967
100. Devpaekar Darindah (دیو پیکر درندہ) (The Humungous Beast) - 1967
101. Tisdle ki Baedaaree (ٹسڈل کی بیداری) (The Awakening of Tisdle) - 1967
102. Khaufnaak Mansoobah (خوفناک منصوبہ) (The Terrifying Plot) - 1968
103. Tabaahee ka Khwaab (تباہی کا خواب) (The Nightmare of Destruction) - 1968
104. Muhlik Shanaasaa'ee (مہلک شناسائی) (The Fatal Acquaintance) - 1968
105. Dhuwaan Hui Deewar (دھواں ہوئی دیوار) (The Wall Became Smoke) - 1969
106. Khoonee Raeshay (خونی ریشے) (The Killing Fibre) - 1969
107. Teesri Naagin (تیسری ناگن) (The Third Female Serpent) - 1969
108. Raegam Baalaa (ریگم بالا) (The Upper Regime) - 1970
109. Bhaeriyay ki Aawaaz (بھیڑیے کی آواز) (The Howling of the Wolf) - 1970
110. Ajnabee ka Faraar (اجنبی کا فرار) (The Escape of the Stranger) - 1971
111. Raushan Hayoolay (روشن ہیولٰی) (The Blazing Aura) - 1971
112. Zard Fitnah (زرد فتنہ) (The Yellow Trials and Tribulations) - 1971
113. Raet kaa Dewta (ریت کا دیوتا) (The Sand God) - 1972
114. Saanpon kaa Maseehaa (سانپوں کا مسیحا) (The Saviour of the Snakes) - 1973
115. Thandaa Jahannam (ٹھنڈا جہنم) (The Cold Hell) - 1973
116. 'Azeem Hamaaqat (عظیم حماقت) (The Great Folly) - 1974
117. Zehreelaa Sayaarah (زہریلا سیارہ) (The Deadly Planet) - 1975
118. Neelam ki Waapsi(نیلم کی واپسی) (The Return of Neelam) - 1976
119. Mauroosee Hawas (مورثی ہوس) (The Inherited Lust) - 1976
120. Dehshat-Gard (دہشت گر) (The Terrorist) - 1977
121. Shikaaree Parchiyaan (شکاری پرچھائیاں) (The Killer Shadows) - 1978
122. Parchaa'iyon K Hamlay (پرچھائیوں کے حملے) (The Assault of Shadows) - 1978
123. Saayon ka Takraa'o (سایوں کا ٹکراؤ) (The Showdown of Silhouettes) - 1978
124. Hamzaad ka Maskan (ہمزاد کا مسکن) (The Dwelling of the Other Self) - 1978
125. Sehraa'ee Deewaanah (صحرائی دیوانہ) (The Desert Lunatic [2 Parts]) - 1979

[§1] → For the 49th issue of Jasoosee Dunyaa, the publisher had to publish 4th novel of Imran Series, Bhayaanak Aaddmee because of some delay in the publication of Golden Jubilee issue - Sho'lon ka Naach.

== See also ==
- Ibne Safi
- Jasoosi Dunya
