= Ali Imran =

Fictional character

Ali Imran (علی عمران)
- Picture from "Chatanon Main Fire" by Mohammad Hanif
- First appearance: August 1955 (Khaufnaak Imarat)
- Last appearance: 10 October 1980 (Aakhree Admi)
- Created by: Ibne-Safi

In-universe information
- Aliases: X-2; Rana Tahavvar Ali Sandooqui; Prince of Dhump
- Gender: Male
- Title: X-2, Chief of Secret Service
- Occupation: Secret agent
- Family: Sir Karam Rahman (Father); Amma Bi (Mother); Surayya (Sister)
- Religion: Islam
- Nationality: Pakistani
- Education: MSc and PhD
- School / University: University of Oxford

Ali Imran (Urdu: علی عمران) is a fictional character in various Urdu language detective novels written by Asrar Ahmed under the pseudonym of Ibn-e-Safi. He serves as the titular protagonist in the Imran Series novels. He is usually referred to only by his last name in the context of the novels.

Imran is written out as a bright and young Oxford graduate, holding both a master's degree and a doctorate in chemistry. Although being highly inquisitive and trained in the matters of criminology, Imran is portrayed rather as showing clumsiness at times to hide the fact that he is a spymaster for a special branch of secret service spy operatives, working for the Ministry of Foreign Affairs. Like Inspector Clouseau in The Pink Panther, this facet of his personality serves also as comic relief throughout the novel series and teems the extreme morbidity and ruthlessness espionage with decent humour.

== Biography ==
=== Early years ===
Ali Imran is an ageless character. He is described to be in his late twenties in earlier novels, and in some later books, early thirties.

Imran's childhood was briefly described by Ibn-e-Safi in one of the novels, Dr. Duago, when he was stating the reasons for Imran's paradoxical personality. Imran's mother was a pious Muslim lady, who wanted to see her son following the religion as well. However, Imran's father, Fazal Rahman (who was also the director general of the Intelligence Bureau's detective unit), chose an American missionary school for his early education. The contradictory teachings of his mother and his school transformed Imran's personality in such a twisted manner that after getting initially confused, he started ridiculing almost everything. Also, due to the strict and dictatorial personality of Fazal Rahman, Imran started living a dual personality from his childhood, acting differently at home and in the outside world.

It is often told in the novels that Imran's family is Pashtun and descendant of Genghis Khan.

=== Time in London ===
After completing high school, Imran was sent to London to live with one of Rahman's English friends, who was a police officer. That friend urged Imran to study criminology, and even provided him with some cases for practical experience. It was during this time that Imran first met the Chinese criminal mastermind, "Sing Hee", and defeated a gangster named McLawrence, who had terrorised London.The entire story is mentioned in Imran Series novel Lashon ka Bazaar.

Imran returned to his homeland after earning MSc and D.Sc. degrees in chemistry.

=== Start of crime fighting career ===
Rahman wanted Imran to join a local university as a professor after his return from London, but Imran flatly refused. After some time, he became friends with Captain Fayyaz, who was a subordinate of Rahman. Imran started helping Fayyaz in some of his cases, which boosted Fayyaz's profile, and also made some higher officials notice Imran's skills. This led to Imran's appointment as "Officer On Special Duties" in his own father's department. Rahman was infuriated at first, but couldn't object because Imran was being recommended by the Ministry of Internal Affairs.

In Bhayanak Aadmi (Imran Series no. 4), Imran dealt with a mysterious smuggler of Shadab Nagar in his own style, which was dismissed by Rahman as a "non-detective, scoundrelly approach". Imran had also brought with him an Anglo-Burmese girl, Roshi, from Shadab Nagar. This annoyed Rahman so much that he forced Imran to resign and ordered him to leave the house.

Imran moved into a flat (which was previously illegally confiscated by Captain Fayyaz), and together with Roshi, opened a private detective agency, disguised as a "Divorce Bureau", since the law didn't allow any private detectives.

=== Secret Service ===
Sir Sultan, who was a secretary in the Ministry of Foreign Affairs, and a friend of Rahman, used to highly acknowledge Imran's abilities, and once requested his assistance in getting rid of a blackmailer. After Imran successfully helped him out, he offered to Imran the position of chief officer (X-2) in the ministry's secret service, which Imran accepted.

Imran's role as X-2 is in complete contrast to his apparent personality. As Ali Imran, he acts as an opportunist, becoming either a police informer or a blackmailer according to the situation's needs. He also works as an informant and a mere "outside agent" for the Secret Service, and is almost always made fun of by other Secret Service members. However, as X-2, he is feared by the same Secret Service members, who do not know the identity of their chief officer, and have only heard his voice over the telephone or a transmitting device. The voice of X-2 is different from the voice of Ali Imran. The members of Secret Service follow X-2's orders almost religiously, scared of any punishment that he may give if they disobey him. The only three other people who know Imran's identity as X-2 are Sir Sultan, Roshi, and Tahir/Black Zero (a Secret Service member whose duty was to pose as X-2 in Imran's absence).

Imran's adventures as X-2 included (among others) the thwarting of many espionage attempts, discovering of spies within national institutions, stopping a civil war conspiracy, and encounters with Zeroland (an international, mysterious, and highly resourceful "nation" of criminals). He was considered a "specialist" of Zeroland, having obtained high knowledge of its hierarchy, operations, and scientific advancements. Imran also had to deal with double crossing foreign agents, who conspired to reveal the identity of X-2.

As X-2, Imran reports directly to Sir Sultan, or to the Head of the State.

== Description and personal life ==
In the books, Ali Imran has frequently been described as young, good looking and having a strong, athletic body, but also with a perpetual demeanor of foolishness showing constantly on his face. Sometimes, the words "gorgeous moron" have been used to state his presence. He also dresses in an eccentric manner, referred to by Ibn-e-Safi as his "technicolor" outfit. For example, Imran may wear a pink coat, with a light green shirt, a yellow necktie, white pants, and a purple flat hat with a red rose in it. However, at times when the need arises, he wears proper and expensive suits. Imran's foolish acts have often described by Ibn-e-Safi to be his second nature and completely without any fabrication. In Imran's own words, he is a "fool of 1st degree(اول درجے کا احمق)" in times of peace.

Imran lives in a modest flat that he obtained through Captain Fayyaz. However, in later books, Mr. Rahman referred to that flat as his own property.

Imran's household staff include his cook, Sulaiman, and Joseph Mugonda, Imran's black bodyguard. In later novels, Sulaiman marries a girl named Gul-Rukh and they both live with Imran.

== Personality traits ==
Imran possesses a sharp wit, which when combined with his intelligence and foolish sense of humour, often leads to interesting conversations. He rarely shuts up, annoying all others around him, even in the face of grave circumstances. He is sometimes stated to be an expert in enraging even the most serene of people. One of his other talent is being a very good actor as he can cry on a moment's notice or change into a completely different personality when necessary.

Imran has often shown a certain disregard towards rules, and does break them if doing so is to his own advantage. It was due to his non-conformity to rules that Mr. Rahman demanded his resignation after he dealt with the smuggler of Shadab Nagar. However, Imran does not override the law and respects its authority, showing yet another side of his paradoxical personality.

Due to Imran's apparently vulnerable nature and handsome looks, women quickly develop a crush on him, but most of the time, Imran uses them to achieve his own goals and offers nothing but a cold shoulder. He is mostly unmoved by the charms of the fairer sex (just like Colonel Faridi), but has been shown to develop some affectionate feelings of friendship towards some of the women he had encountered, notably, Roshi and Mariana (during the Ad Lava series). Juliana Fitzwater, the only female member of Secret Service, has shown romantic feelings towards Imran on numerous occasions. Theresia Bumble Bee of Bohemia (T3B), who is one of the main antagonists of Imran Series and chief of the Zeroland, also has a huge crush on Imran, and Imran often flirts with her. However, being an extremely beautiful woman, Theresia once made Imran "aware of the existence of the most delicate portions of his mind" when she appeared before him without any disguise and makeup. Rather Sung Hi presumed Theresia might be in her real appearance. Otherwise she only appeared without makeup in Kalay Chiragh where Ali Imran when saw, instantly recognized her as Theresia Bumble Bee of Bohemia.

Imran is fiercely patriotic and protecting his country from foreign spies and threats is his top priority. It is his this personality trait that makes him highly ruthless in the line of his duty. At times, Imran had also dropped his comical nature and acted in a cold and serious manner, intimidating other Secret Service members to an extent that they followed his lead silently without any objection. This was specially evident during Secret Service's adventure in the tribal area of Shikral.

Mostly, Imran likes working alone, though he keeps in contact with his subordinates, either as X-2 or as Imran.

== Skills and abilities ==
=== Intelligence ===
Despite his foolish exterior, Imran is a quick thinker and a demon planner. He often comes up with clever and prompt solutions to different problems, and concludes correctly about various aspects of a case. He is also an expert con-artist, and uses his sharp tongue and comical personality to squeeze the required information out of other people.

=== Combat ===
Imran can handle himself in hand-to-hand combat easily and has never really lost a fight. His style of fighting is often described as playful, with his face calm and his actions and movements smooth and under his control. In some novels, it is revealed that he has become a master of all martial arts and has created his own fighting style. Sometimes, he acted in a cowardly manner during a fight to give his opponent a false sense of superiority and then used it to his advantage. His basic strategy most of time is being defensive in such a way that he tires out his opponent to subdue him.

Imran can also handle a great array of weapons competently. He once used a wooden stick to defend himself against opponents armed with spears. He also judged at another time that a gun was not loaded by feeling its weight. Most of the times he's armed with an air gun which is modified to be used as to fire bullets which can be lethal or to blow out toxic or non-lethal air to subdue his enemies.

Imran is also proficient in the Sing Art, the technique of literally dodging bullets by judging the hand movements of the attacker, and moving sharply. The Sing Art was devised by Sing Hee, who performed it in front of Imran during his student years in London. Imran asked Sing to perform it again five times, and being a quick learner, was able to grasp the technique. Sing, initially stunned at Imran's brilliance, then declared Imran to be his nephew in the cunning arts, while Imran started calling Sing his "uncle". The Sing Art, however, works only if the attacker is single and is firing a single shot at a time.

=== Linguistics ===
Imran is a fluent speaker in many languages, including Urdu, Hindi, Tamil and almost all the regional ones. Foreign languages that he is shown to be fluent in include English, Arabic, Persian, Swahili, Shakrali (a fictional language in the series), French, Russian, Greek, Italian, Spanish, and German. He is also capable of assuming native accents. It is not stated when or how he learnt all of them, but it can be assumed that most of these were learnt by him during his time in London.

== See also ==
- Ibn-e-Safi
- Imran Series
- Imran series characters
