= Ibn-e-Safi =

Pakistani writer, poet and novelist (1928–1980)

- ابن صفی
- Born: Asrar Ahmad; 26 July 1928; Nara, Allahabad, British India (now Uttar Pradesh, India)
- Died: 26 July 1980 (aged 52); Karachi, Pakistan
- Occupations: Novelist; poet
- Writing career
- Period: 1940–1980
- Genres: Mystery; fiction; adventure
- Notable works: Characters; Ahmad Kamal Faridi; Sajid Hameed; Ali Imran; Book series; Jasoosi Dunya; Imran Series
- Notable awards: Sitara-i-Imtiaz (Star of Excellence) award by the President of Pakistan (2020)
- Website: ibnesafi.info

Asrar Ahmad (Urdu: اسرار احمد; 26 July 1928 – 26 July 1980), known by the pen name Ibn-e-Safi (ابن صفی; also spelt Ibne Safi), was a Pakistani fiction writer, novelist, and poet who wrote in Urdu. The name Ibn-e-Safi is a Persian expression meaning "Son of Safi", with Safi translating to "chaste" or "righteous".

He began his literary career in British India during the 1940s and continued writing in Pakistan after the country's independence in 1947.

His main works were the 124-book series Jasoosi Dunya (The Spy World) and the 121-book Imran Series, with a small canon of satirical works and poetry. His novels were characterised by a blend of mystery, adventure, suspense, violence, romance and comedy, achieving massive popularity across a broad readership in South Asia.

== Biography ==
=== Early life and education ===
Asrar Ahmad was born on 26 July 1928 in the town 'Nara' of district Allahabad, India. His father's name was Safiullah and mother's name was Naziran Bibi. His ancestors were Hindus of the Kayashta community, specialised in the fields of education and administration, who converted to Islam many generations ago.

He received a Bachelor of Arts degree from Agra University. In 1948, he started his first job at 'Nikhat Publications' as an editor in the poetry department. His initial works date back to the early 1940s, when he wrote from British India. He also studied at the University of Allahabad where he was class fellow of Professor Mohammad Uzair and one year senior to Mustafa Zaidi . After the independence of India and Pakistan in 1947, he began writing novels in the early 1950s while working as a secondary school teacher and continuing part-time studies. After completing the latter, having attracted official attention as being subversive in the independence and post-independence period, he migrated to Karachi, Sindh, Pakistan in August 1952. He started his own company by the name 'Asrar Publications'.

=== Later life ===
He married Umme Salma Khatoon in 1953. In the period from 1960 to 1963, he suffered an episode of severe depression and schizophrenia and spent some time in the psychiatry ward of a hospital, some arguing that it was a result of his prolific literary output, as he used to publish 4 novels a month during that time, but he eventually recovered, and returned with a best-selling Imran Series novel, Dairrh Matwaalay (One and a half amused) which was published in India by the to-be-Prime Minister Lal Bahadur Shastri. In fact, he wrote 36 novels of 'Jasoosi Duniya' and 79 novels of 'Imran Series' after his recovery from depression. In the 1970s, he informally advised the Inter-Services Intelligence of Pakistan on methods of detection.

=== Death ===
Ibne Safi died on 26 July 1980 of pancreatic cancer at age 52. He was buried in Paposhnagar graveyard in Karachi.

== Literary career ==
=== Early attempts ===
Ibn-e-Safi started writing poetry in his childhood and soon earned critical acclaim in whole South-Asian community. After completing his Bachelor of Arts, he started writing short stories, humour and satire under various names such as "Siniki (Cynic) Soldier" and "Tughral Farghan." In the Nakhat magazines, he published several satirical articles which commented on various topics ranging from politics to literature to journalism. His early works in the 1940s included short stories, humour and satire. For his literary works he was inspired by both British cinema and Hollywood, especially Alfred Hitchcock, while among writers he was fond of Arthur Conan Doyle, Agatha Christie, Earl Stanley Gardner, Harold Robbins, Alistair MacLean and Louis L'Amour for his Westerns.

=== Jasoosi Dunya and Imran Series ===
According to one of his autobiographical essays, someone at a literary meeting claimed that Urdu literature had little scope beyond sexual themes. To challenge this notion, Ibn-e-Safi began writing several detective stories in January 1952. These were published in the monthly digest, Nikhat, under the series name Jasoosi Dunya. In 1953, Ibn-e-Safi, along with his mother and sister, moved to Karachi, Pakistan, joining his father who had migrated there earlier in 1947.

In 1955, Ibn-e-Safi started Imran Series, which gained as much fame and success as Jasoosi Dunya. Ibne Safi's novels – characterised by a blend of adventure, suspense, violence, romance, and comedy – achieved massive popularity by a broad readership.

Ibn-e-Safi was a creator of secondary world fiction, creating numerous fantastical settings for his works. Fans of his work praise these settings for their imagination and verisimilitude, and many locations from his novels have inspired the names of venues in cities in India and Pakistan.

=== Other prose works ===
In addition to his humorous and satirical works, Ibne-e-Safi penned several short adventure stories, including Baldraan Ki Malika (The Queen of Baldraan), Ab Tak Thee Kahaan? (Where Had You Been?), Shumal Ka Fitna (Trouble from the North), Gultarang, and Moaziz Khopri. These adventures transport readers to a series of exotic, imaginary worlds born from his own creative vision.

In 1959, Ibne-e-Safi embarked on writing Aadmi Ki Jarain, a book exploring human psychology. Unfortunately, his illness forced him to leave the work incomplete.

=== Poetry ===
(Note: Most of the English translations of Urdu poetry and titles are literal and do not capture the true essence of the language. Some meaning is definitely lost in translation.)

Ibn-e-Safi was also a poet. He used to write poems under the pen name of "Asrar Narvi". He wrote in various genres of Urdu poetry, such as Hamd, Na`at, Manqabat, Marsiya, Ghazal, and Nazm. His collection of poetry, Mata-e Qalb-o-Nazar (Urdu or in English (The Assets of Heart & Sight), remains unpublished.

Following is the list of his Ghazals:

- Daulat-e-Gham (Urdu (The wealth of sorrow)
- Zahan se Dil ka Bar Utra Hai (Urdu (Heaviness of the heart is unloaded by the mind)
- Chhalakti aayay (Urdu (The liquor shows up overflowing)
- Kuchh Tau Ta-alluq ... (Urdu (Some affiliation ...)
- Aaj ki raat (Urdu (Tonight)
- Baday ghazab ka ... (Urdu (Of Much Might ...)
- Yun hi wabastagi (Urdu (Casual connection)
- Lab-o-rukhsar-o-jabeen (Urdu (Lips and Cheeks and forehead)
- Rah-e-talab mein kaun kisi ka (Urdu (In the path of demands, no one recognises anyone)
- Kuch bhi to apne paas nahin ... (Urdu (Do not have anything ...)
- Aay nigaraan-e-khoobroo (Urdu (Gorgeous Sculptures)
- Kabhi sawab ki hain ... (Urdu (Sometimes, of virtuousness ...)
- Kabhi qatil ... (Urdu for Sometimes killer ...)
- Qafas ki daastaan hai ... (Urdu (It is the tale of imprisonment ...)
- Maan (Urdu (Mother)
- Shakist-e-talism (Urdu (Defeat of the Magic)
- Talism-e-hosh-ruba (Urdu (The Breath-taking Magic)
- Tanhayee (Urdu (Solitude)
- Bansuri Ki Aawaz (Urdu (The Sound of Flute)

== Dhamaka – A film by Ibn-e-Safi ==
Ibne Safi wrote both the story and screenplay for the film Dhamaka, adapted from his novel Bebakon ki Talash. Despite its merits, the film did not receive the publicity and acclaim it deserved, and it remains largely forgotten.

Produced by Muhammad Hussain Talpur, Dhamaka is based on the Imran Series novel Baibaakon Ki Talaash (Urdu for "In Search of the Outrageous"). The film introduced Pakistani actor Javed Sheikh (then known as Javaid Iqbal) in the lead role of Zafarul Mulk. Producer Muhammad Hussain Talpur also appeared in the film as Jameson, while actress Shabnam portrayed Sabiha. Notably, the characters Imran and the X-2 team were not featured in the movie, although Ibne Safi himself recorded the voice of X-2. Additionally, actor Rehman made his debut as a villain. The film includes a rendition of the ghazal "Rah-e-talab mein kaun kisi ka," sung by Habib Wali Mohammed and written by Ibne Safi. Dhamaka was released on 13 December 1974.

== Reception ==
=== Influence in Bollywood ===
Renowned Bollywood screenwriter and lyricist Javed Akhtar was deeply inspired by Ibn-e-Safi’s Urdu novels, which he avidly read during his childhood. He was particularly drawn to the Jasoosi Dunya and Imran Series detective novels. The fast-paced action, tightly woven plots, and vibrant use of language in these thrillers left a strong impression on him. Akhtar fondly recalled Ibne-e-Safi’s unforgettable characters with their distinctive, often whimsical names—an element that significantly influenced his own writing. Many of his Bollywood scripts reflect Ibn-e-Safi’s narrative style, including the use of vivid character names, sharp dialogue, and larger-than-life personalities. Akhtar credited Ibn-e-Safi with teaching him the power of memorable characters, a lesson that helped inspire iconic Bollywood villains like Gabbar Singh in Sholay (1975) and Mogambo in Mr. India (1987).

=== Translations ===
The first English translations of Ibne Safi's mystery novels began appearing in 2010, with The House of Fear from the Imraan Series, translated by Bilal Tanweer and published by Random House India. In 2011, Blaft Publications in association with Tranquebar released four more novels, this time from the Jasoosi Duniya series, translated by the highly acclaimed Urdu critic Shamsur Rahman Faruqi.

== Bibliography ==
List of his non-series work

- Aadmi ki Jarain (Urdu for The Roots of The Man) – Incomplete
- Baldaraan ki Malikaa (Urdu for The Queen of Baldaraan)
- Ab Tak Thee Kahaan (Urdu for Where Had You Been?)
- Diplomat Murgh (Urdu for The Diplomat Rooster)
- Saarhe Paanch Baje (Urdu for Half Past Five)
- Tuzk-e-Do-Piazi (Urdu for The autobiography of Do-Piaza) – Incomplete
- Shumaal ka Fitna (Urdu for The Trouble From North)
- Mata-e Qalb-O-Nazar – Collection of Poetry (to be published)

Novels

- Allama Dehshatnak
- Alphonse
- Khatarnak Lashein (The Dangerous Corpse)
- Saanpon Ke Shikari
- Khaufnak Imarat (The House of Fear) (1955)
- Purasrar Cheekhein (1955)
- Larkiyon Ka Jazirah (The Island of Maidens)
- Raat Ka Shehzada (The Nocturnal Prince)
- Dhuain ki Tehreer (Scribblings in Smoke)
- Pathar Ka Khoon (Blood in Stones)
- Neelay Parindey (The Birds in Blue)
- Jaron Ki Talash (The Search for the Roots)
- Chattanon Mein Fire (Shootout at the Rocks) (1955)

== Awards and recognition ==
- Sitara-i-Imtiaz (Star of Excellence) Award by the President of Pakistan in 2020

== See also ==
- List of Pakistani writers
- Jasoosi Dunya
- Imran Series
- List of Jasoosi Dunya
- List of Imran Series
- The House of Fear
